= 2023 Czech Lion Awards =

Czech film and TV award ceremony

31st Czech Lion Awards
- Date: 9 March 2024
- Hosted by: Marek Eben

Highlights
- Best Picture: Brothers
- Best Actor: Kryštof Hádek; Volha
- Best Actress: Simona Peková; She Came at Night
- Best Supporting Actor: Tomáš Jeřábek; Volha
- Best Supporting Actress: Milena Steinmasslová; The Exhale
- Most awards: Restore Point and Volha (5)
- Most nominations: Brothers (15)

Television coverage
- Network: Česká televize
- Ratings: 697,000 (21.28%)

2023 Czech Lion Awards ceremony was held on 9 March 2024.

== Categories ==
Nominations were announced on 15 January 2024. Brothers received highest number of nominations but television series Volha and film Restore Point received most wins while Brothers won only Best film category.

Best Film	Best Director
Brothers; The Exhale; She Came at Night; Waltzing Matilda; We Have Never Been Modern	She Came at Night - Tomáš Pavlíček, Jan Vejnar; Brothers - Tomáš Mašín; The Exhale - Tomáš Mašín; Waltzing Matilda - Petr Slavík; We Have Never Been Modern - Matěj Chlupáček
Best Actor in a Leading Role	Best Actress in a Leading Role
Volha - Kryštof Hádek; Brothers - Oskar Hes; Brothers - Jan Nedbal; A Sensitive Person - David Prachař; Waltzing Matilda - Karel Roden	She Came at Night - Simona Peková; Brothers - Tatiana Dyková Vilhelmová; The Exhale - Jana Plodková; Waltzing Matilda - Regina Rázlová; We Have Never Been Modern - Eliška Křenková
Best Actor in a Supporting Role	Best Actress in a Supporting Role
Volha - Tomáš Jeřábek; Restore Point - Václav Neužil; Brothers - Stefan Konarske; She Came at Night - Jiří Rendl; Waltzing Matilda - Antonio Šoposki	The Exhale - Milena Steinmasslová; Brothers - Karolína Lea Nováková; The Body - Denisa Barešová; She Came at Night - Annette Nesvadbová; We Have Never Been Modern - Martha Issová
Best Screenplay	Best Editing
The Exhale - Alice Nellis; Brothers - Marek Epstein; She Came at Night - Tomáš Pavlíček, Jan Vejnar; Waltzing Matilda - Nataša Slavíková, Petr Slavík; We Have Never Been Modern - Miro Šifra	Restore Point - Jarosław Kamiński; Brothers - Petr Turyna; The Exhale - Michal Hýka, Filip De Pina; She Came at Night - Jakub Vansa; We Have Never Been Modern - Pavel Hrdlička
Best Cinematography	Stage Design
Restore Point - Filip Marek; Brothers - Friede Clausz; A Sensitive Person - Dušan Husár; The Exhale - Anna Smoroňová; We Have Never Been Modern - Martin Douba	Restore Point - Ondřej Lipenský; Brothers - Milan Býček; A Sensitive Person - Stella Šonková; We Have Never Been Modern - Henrich Boráros; Volha - Jan Vlasák
Makeup and Hairstyling	Costume Design
Volha - Martin Valeš, Jana Bílková, Martin Větrovec; Restore Point - Vladimír Wittgruber; Brothers - Adéla Anděla Bursová; A Sensitive Person - Andrea Štrbová; We Have Never Been Modern - Lenka Nosková, Martin Jankovič	Volha - Vladimíra Pachl Fomínová; Restore Point - Ivan Stekla, Eliška Krejzová; Brothers - Ján Kocman; The Chambermaid - Katarína Štrbová Bieliková; We Have Never Been Modern - Jarmila Dunděrová
Music	Sound
Waltzing Matilda - Michal Pavlíček; Restore Point - Jan Šléška; Brothers - Karel Havlíček; A Sensitive Person - Jonatan Pjoni Pastirčák; We Have Never Been Modern - Simon Goff	Restore Point - Lukáš Ujčík, Samuel Jurkovič, Jan Šulcek; Brothers - David Titěra, Viktor Ekrt; She Came at Night - Michaela Patríková; Tony, Shelly and the Magic Light - Péter Benjámin Lukács; We Have Never Been Modern - Pavel Rejholec, Peter Hilčanský, Tomáš Zůbek
Extraordinary audiovisual achievement	Best Documentary
Green Border	Všechno dobře dopadne; Blix Not Bombs; Moje nebe je horší než tvoje peklo; Návštěvníci; Velké nic
Best Animated Film	Best Short Film
Tony, Shelly and the Magic Light; Dede Is Dead; Electra	Credentialing; Stuck Together; Eighth Day
Best Television Film or Miniseries	Best TV Series
Mathematics of Crime; Into the Darkness; Docent	Volha; annaismissing; Good Morning, Brno!
Unique Contribution to Czech Film
Vladimír Smutný

=== Non-statutory Awards ===
Best Film Poster	Film Fans Award
The Exhale; Brutal Heat; You Will Never See It All; She Came at Night; We Have Never Been Modern	Restore Point
Magnesie Award for Best Student Film
Electra; Dede Is Dead; Doprovázení; Stuck Together; Eighth Day

=== Films and series with multiple wins and nominations ===
Wins	Nominations	Films and series
5	10	Restore Point
5	6	Volha
3	8	The Exhale
1	15	Brothers
1	9	She Came at Night
1	7	Waltzing Matilda
1	2	Electra
1	2	Tony, Shelly and the Magic Light
0	13	We Have Never Been Modern
0	5	A Sensitive Person
