= 2015 Czech Lion Awards =

Czech film and TV award ceremony

23rd Czech Lion Awards
- Date: 5 March 2016
- Site: Rudolfinum, Prague
- Hosted by: Lucie Výborná

Highlights
- Best Picture: The Snake Brothers
- Best Actor: Matěj Hádek; The Snake Brothers
- Best Actress: Alena Mihulová; Home Care
- Best Supporting Actor: Kryštof Hádek; The Snake Brothers
- Best Supporting Actress: Lucie Žáčková; The Snake Brothers
- Most awards: The Snake Brothers (6)
- Most nominations: Lost in Munich (15)

Television coverage
- Network: Česká televize

The 2016 Czech Lion Awards ceremony was held on 5 March 2016. Petr Zelenka's Lost in Munich received highest number of nominations but won only two categories. The Snake Brothers has won 6 awards, including Best picture film.

== Winners and nominees ==
Best Film	Best Director
The Snake Brothers – Ondřej Zima, Jan Prušinovský; Home Care – Slávek Horák; Photographer – Viktor Schwarcz, Irena Pavlásková; Schmitke – Tomáš Vach, Radim Procházka; Lost in Munich – David Ondříček	The Snake Brothers – Jan Prušinovský; Home Care – Slávek Horák; The Seven Ravens – Alice Nellis; Schmitke – Štěpán Altrichter; Lost in Munich – Petr Zelenka
Best Actor in a Leading Role	Best Actress in a Leading Role
Matěj Hádek – The Snake Brothers; Bolek Polívka – Home Care; Karel Roden – Photographer; Hynek Čermák – Gangster Ka; Martin Myšička – Lost in Munich	Alena Mihulová – Home Care; Máša Málková – Photographer; Tereza Voříšková – Laputa; Martha Issová – The Seven Ravens; Jana Plodková – Lost in Munich
Best Actor in a Supporting Role	Best Actress in a Supporting Role
Kryštof Hádek – The Snake Brothers; Predrag Bjelac – Gangster Ka; Jiří Schmitzer – The Fifty; Tomáš Bambušek – Lost in Munich; Marek Taclík – Lost in Munich	Lucie Žáčková – The Snake Brothers; Zuzana Kronerová – Home Care; Tatiana Vilhelmová – Home Care; Zuzana Bydžovská – The Seven Ravens; Jitka Schneiderová – Lost in Munich
Best Screenplay	Best Editing
Lost in Munich – Petr Zelenka; Home Care – Slávek Horák; The Snake Brothers – Jaroslav Žváček; The Seven Ravens – Alice Nellis; Schmitke – Tomáš Končinský, Jan Fusek, Štěpán Altrichter	Lost in Munich – Vladimír Barák; Home Care – Vladimír Barák; Photographer – Alois Fišárek; The Snake Brothers – Lukáš Opatrný; Schmitke – Philipp Wenning, Andrea Schumacher
Best Cinematography	Stage Design
The Snake Brothers – Petr Koblovský; Home Care – Jan Šťastný; Photographer – David Ployhar; Schmitke – Cristian Pirjol; Lost in Munich – Alexander Šurkala	The Seven Ravens – Ondřej Mašek, Peter Čanecký; The Snake Brothers – Jan Novotný; Schmitke – Barbora Kačena; Wilsonov – Martin Kurel; Lost in Munich – Ondřej Nekvasil
Makeup and Hairstyling	Costume Design
The Seven Ravens – Juraj Steiner; The Snake Brothers – Lukáš Král; The Fifty – Jana Dopitová; Wilsonov – Jana Radilová; Lost in Munich – Jana Bílková	The Seven Ravens – Kateřina Štefková; Photographer – Jaroslava Pecharová; The Snake Brothers – Ivan Stekla; Wilsonov – Katarína Štrbová Bieliková; Lost in Munich – Vladimíra Fomínová
Music	Sound
Schmitke – Johannes Repka; Photographer – Jiří Chlumecký; The Seven Ravens – Václav Patejdl; Wilsonov – Michal Novinski; Lost in Munich – Matouš Hejl	Schmitke – Cristoph Chevallerie; The Snake Brothers – Matěj Matuška, Michal Čech; The Seven Ravens – Jiří Klenka; wave vs. shore – Radim Hladík ml.; Lost in Munich – Michal Holubec
Unique Contribution to Czech Film	Best Documentary
Stanislav Milota	Lean a Ladder Against Heaven; The Gospel According to Brabenec; Film Adventurer Karel Zeman; Mallory; wave vs. shore
Best Television Film or Miniseries	BestTV Series
The American Letters; Jan Hus; Crown Prince; Case for Exorcist; Správnej dres	Mamon; Atentát; Doktor Martin; Labyrint; Policie Modrava; Přístav; Stopy života II.; Vinaři II.; Vraždy v kruhu

=== Non-statutory Awards ===
- Best Film Poster
  - The Snake Brothers – Michal Tilsch
- Film Fans Award
  - The Snake Brothers
- Magnesie Award for Best Student Film
  - Peacock – Ondřej Hudeček
