= Czech Film Critics' Award for Best Actor =

- Country: Czech Republic
- First award: 2014
- Currently held by: Milan Ondrík
- Website: filmovakritika.cz

Czech Film Critics' Award for Best Actor is one of the awards given to the best Czech motion picture.

== Winners ==
Year	Actor	Film title (English)	Film title (Original)
2014	Martin Finger (1)	The Lake	Krásno
2015	Kryštof Hádek (1)	The Snake Brothers	Kobry a užovky
2016	Miroslav Hanuš (1)	We Are Never Alone	Nikdy nejsme sami
2017	Karel Roden (1)	A Prominent Patient	Masaryk
2018	Martin Huba (1)	Talks with TGM	Hovory s TGM
2019	Jiří Schmitzer (1)	Old-Timers	Staříci
2020	Ivan Trojan (1)	Charlatan	Šarlatán
2021	Václav Neužil (1)	Zátopek	Zátopek
2022	Michal Kern (1)	Arved	Arvéd
2023	Karel Roden (2)	Waltzing Matilda	Tancuj Matyldo
2024	Oldřich Kaiser (1)	The Gardener's Year	Zahradníkův rok
2025	Milan Ondrík (1)	Father	Otec
