= The Fourth Star =

- Genre: Comedy
- Written by: Petr Kolečko; Jan Prušinovský; Miroslav Krobot
- Directed by: Jan Prušinovský; Miroslav Krobot
- Starring: Václav Neužil; Ivan Trojan; Martin Myšička
- Country of origin: Czech Republic
- Original language: Czech
- No. of seasons: 1
- No. of episodes: 12

Production
- Running time: 28 minutes

Original release
- Network: Czech Television
- Release: January 6 – March 24, 2014

Čtvrtá hvězda (The Fourth Star) is a Czech television sitcom that premiered on Czech Television from January 6 to March 24, 2014. It was filmed by Jan Prušinovský and Miroslav Krobot with the screenplay contribution of Petr Koleček. The complete ensemble of the Dejvice Theater performed in the main roles.

== Plot ==
A young countryman, Štěpán Koláček (Václav Neužil), who has just returned from a stay in England, gets a job as a night receptionist at the run-down Libeň Hotel Meteor, where his old uncle František (Ivan Trojan) is already employed. Štěpán falls in love with his colleague Pavlína (Martha Issová), who is a daily receptionist at the hotel. He therefore only sees her when there is a shift change. In addition, Štěpán has a more successful partner - he is Pavlína's partner, die-hard Sparta fan and occasional lover of hotel manager Tereza (Lenka Krobotová), hotel maintenance worker David (David Novotný). Tereza is pursuing her dream of getting a fourth star for the three-star Hotel Meteor. Her phlegmatic ex-husband Theodor (Martin Myšička), who holds the post of hotel director, does not help her in any way. His only interest is in improving himself in the Chinese game of mahjong. The story thus follows the difficult journey to obtain the fourth star, spiced up by the vicissitudes of various workplace relationships between more or less bizarre characters.

== Cast ==
- Václav Neužil as Štěpán, new night receptionist
- Ivan Trojan as František, Štěpán's uncle, night receptionist and thief
- David Novotný as David, repairman
- Martha Issová as Pavlína, day reptionist
- Martin Myšička as Theodor, director
- Lenka Krobotová as Tereza, manager
- Simona Babčáková as Jiřina, bartender
- Miroslav Krobot as Tichý, chef
- Jaroslav Plesl as Smutný, chef
- Marek Taclík as Jindra, taxi driver
- Klára Melíšková as Libuška, hotel hostess
- Pavel Šimčík as Major
- Jana Holcová as Oksana, cleaning lady
- Pavlína Štorková as Alena, cleaning lady
- Lukáš Příkazký as policeman
- Hynek Čermák as priest
- Radek Holub as Uran
- Jan Kašpar as guest
- Taťjana Medvecká as Štěpán's mother
