= Zkáza Dejvického divadla =

- Genre: Comedy
- Country of origin: Czech Republic
- Original language: Czech
- No. of seasons: 1
- No. of episodes: 6

Production
- Running time: 30 minutes

Original release
- Network: Czech Television
- Release: March 4 – April 8, 2019

Zkáza Dejvického divadla (English: The End of Dejvice Theatre) is a six-part Czech television comedy series about the Dejvice Theatre, whose actors and other employees play themselves. The script was written by Miroslav Krobot and Ondřej Hübl, the director is Miroslav Krobot. The pre-premiere of all six parts took place on February 27, 2019, in 50 Czech cinemas. The series premiered on Czech Television from March 4 to April 8, 2019.

== Cast ==
In the series, the actors of the Dejvice Theatre play themselves.

- Simona Babčáková
- Hynek Čermák
- Jana Holcová
- Martha Issová
- Miroslav Krobot
- Lenka Krobotová
- Veronika Kubařová
- Klára Melíšková
- Martin Myšička
- Václav Neužil
- David Novotný
- Jaroslav Plesl
- Pavel Šimčík
- Ivan Trojan
- Zdeňka Žádníková-Volencová

== Reviews ==
- Mirka Spáčilová, iDNES.cz, 4 March 2019,
- Stanislav Dvořák, Novinky.cz, 22 February 2019,
- Dominika Kubištová, nekdeneco.cz, 4 March 2019,
