= Volha (TV series) =

- Genre: Comedy, Drama
- Written by: Jan Pachl, Karel Hynie
- Directed by: Jan Pachl
- Starring: Kryštof Hádek, Tomáš Jeřábek, Aňa Geislerová
- Country of origin: Czech Republic
- Original language: Czech
- No. of seasons: 1
- No. of episodes: 5

Production
- Producer: Josef Viewegh
- Running time: 75-76 minutes

Original release
- Network: ČT1
- Release: April 2 – April 30, 2023

Volha (Volga) is a comedy-drama television series directed by Jan Pachl. It is based on a book by Karel Hynie called Volha – záznam o provozu motorového vozidla. It started broadcast on 2 April 2023. The series follows a Czechoslovak television chauffeur Standa Pekárek from 1970s to 1990s. It was filmed to celebrate 70th anniversary of television broadcast in the Czech Republic.

== Plot ==
Communist Czechoslovakia in 1971. Standa Pekárek finishes his compulsory military service and became a chauffeur at Czechoslovak television. He dreams about getting his own Volha, driving for the humor and folk entertainment editorial office and driving Karel Gott. He is willing to do anything to fulfill his dream and thus he agrees to collaborate with State Security under codename Volha.

== Cast ==
- Kryštof Hádek as Standa Pekárek
- Klára Melíšková as Mother Pekárková
- Tomáš Jeřábek as producer Pepa Horáček
- Aňa Geislerová as Director Vlasta Válová
- Stanislav Majer as Cinematographer Zikmund
- Aneta Krejčíková as Secretary Květa
- Eliška Křenková as assistant Dáša
- Lukáš Příkazký as Editor Zajíček
- Bohumil Klepl as Director Truhlář
- Jiří Dvořák as StB operative Labský
- Přemysl Bureš as StB operative Šlégr
- Robert Mikluš as Pavel Landovský
- Vanda Hybnerová as Jungmanová
- Jiří Lábus as Míla Vyhnálek
- Martin Pechlát as Comrade Brabec
- Kristína Svarinská as Pekárek's second wife Táňa

== Episodes ==
No.	Title	Directed by	Written by	Original release date	Czech viewers (millions)
1	"FOXTERIÉRY"	Jan Pachl	Jan Pachl, Karel Hynie	April 2, 2023	1.267
Year 1971. Stanislav Pekárek, a recent graduate of military basic service, starts as a driver of the Czech Railways. Soon, he rubs off and sets out for the first exterior filming, where he gets an overview of the opinions and functioning of the artistic "collective", as well as the principles of the socialist economy. The subsequent falsification of petrol coupons becomes fatal for him. State security has a hook on him and Pekárek signs cooperation. It also has its advantages, the dream of a Volga car is within reach.
2	"HULIZA"	Jan Pachl	Jan Pachl, Karel Hynie	April 9, 2023	0.936
Normalization. At the intercession of the higher ups, Pekárek is assigned a Volga car and joins the humor and popular entertainment editorial office. In the whirlwind of television shows, sexual adventures and accumulating financial bonuses, he seemed to forget not only his family, but also his Faustian fate. Lax cooperation with StB is not acceptable to him, so he has to toughen up. He cautiously begins to introduce his co-workers. But even he is not left without a shell and is demoted to a porter. It is clear to him that he will only get back in the saddle if he sacrifices someone. Director Válová is first in line. Standa has his own excuse: "They're all idiots anyway, who only exalt themselves over us workers."
3	"TEL-EVÍZE"	Jan Pachl	Jan Pachl, Karel Hynie	April 16, 2023	1.161
The drivers of the Socialist Labor Brigade set up a truck operation with the goal of going to the hockey world championship in Vienna. In the exteriors, Standa Pekárek meets his future wife, soon they are expecting a child and move to a new apartment. Standa is doing great, but it's not free. His next victim is the director Truhlář, for whom his great passion becomes fatal.
4	"MAESTRO"	Jan Pachl	Jan Pachl, Karel Hynie	April 23, 2023	1.153
It's the golden eighties, the period of Spartakiad. The baker is happy, passing the Soviet soldiers with color televisions and finally Karel Gott gets into his car. Standa is "king". Little does he know that he has made a powerful enemy. The vision of a trip to the championship in Vienna is suddenly gone. Although the anti-state activities of the producer Horáček are taking place outside Pekárek's field of vision, Standa is already dangerously close.
5	"BALBA"	Jan Pachl	Jan Pachl, Karel Hynie	April 30, 2023	0.923
Pekárek's first trip to the West. Digitals, crashers and Viennese Mexico Square. But even there they have to fulfill the tasks of the StB. Somewhere between the filming of the programs Sejdeme se na Vlachovce and the reportage from JZD Slušovice, a fundamental upheaval will occur. Gradually his mother, son and second wife leave him. Revolution. State security operatives change their coats and agent Volha is suddenly indispensable. But even for him, the company has a new application. Three cars, two color televisions and a stable job can't be a loss. As Standa says, "Who has this?"

== Reception ==
The series won 5 awards at 2023 Czech Lion Awards in categories Best Actor in Leading Role (for Kryštof Hádek), Best Supporting Actor (for Tomáš Jeřábek), Makeup and Hairstyling, Costume Design and Best TV Series. Along with Restore Point it was the most successful 2023 project according to number of won categories. Volha was the first television series to win the most categories at Czech Lion Awards.
