= Changes (2026 film) =

2026 Czech film by David Ondříček

- Directed by: David Ondříček
- Written by: David Ondříček
- Produced by: Lucky Man Films
- Starring: Jaroslav Plesl; Václav Neužil; Martha Issová; Jan Nedbal; Vojtěch Vodochodský; Denisa Barešová; Anna Kameníková
- Cinematography: David Hofmann
- Edited by: Filip Malásek
- Music by: Rhumba Club
- Release date: 22 October 2026
- Running time: 107 minutes
- Country: Czech Republic
- Language: Czech

Changes (Czech: Kluci to vidí jinak než holky) is an upcoming Czech comedy film directed by David Ondříček.

== Plot ==
The lives of seven characters in contemporary Prague, aged between thirty and fifty, who are going through life's crossroads and reassessing their career and personal successes.

The main storyline focuses on a fifty-year-old painter, Martin, who compensates for his own creative insecurity with significant self-promotion. His wife, Kamila, is a talented artist who has long supported the family emotionally and practically, but is now beginning to doubt the correctness of her previous decisions.

In parallel, the film follows Daniel, a romantic idealist planning a wedding with a successful athlete, Romana, who, however, has doubts about their future together. The story also includes a successful lawyer, Karel, struggling with drug addiction, and Marek, whose position is threatened when his younger partner, journalist Ema, begins to overshadow him professionally.

== Cast ==
- Jaroslav Plesl as Martin
- Martha Issová as Kamila
- Václav Neužil as Karel
- Jan Nedbal as Marek
- Vojtěch Vodochodský as Daniel
- Denisa Barešová as Romana
- Anna Kameníková as Ema

== Production ==
Director and screenwriter David Ondříček wrote specific roles tailored to an ensemble of frequent collaborators and actors he had long sought to work with, aiming to match the characters to their specific rhythms. Prior to principal photography, the cast underwent an extensive rehearsal process. Ondříček developed the script collaboratively, holding individual and group discussions with the actors based on an early draft. This process culminated in a script retreat where the cast contributed character details, which Ondříček characterized as giving them an authorial share in their respective roles.

To establish an authentic contemporary visual style for the film, Ondříček personally scouted filming locations throughout the city of Prague using a scooter. Most locations were used as found, requiring minimal set decoration or alterations.

Following his work on larger-scale historical projects (In the Shadow, Dukla 61, Zátopek), Ondříček opted for a streamlined production footprint. The film was shot using a compact, agile crew of approximately 40 to 45 personnel, deliberately omitting large base camps and caravans to facilitate rapid movement across urban locations.

The film's soundtrack was provided by the British synth-pop and alt-disco project Rhumba Club, led by musician Tom Falle. Ondříček approached the group to contribute their 1980s-inspired synth-pop sound to add emotional depth to the production. In addition to supplying music for the soundtrack, Falle was cast to perform the track on camera during the film's climactic scenes.
