= Dukla 61 =

2018 Czech disaster film

- Written by: Jakub Režný
- Directed by: David Ondříček
- Starring: Marek Taclík, Martha Issová
- Music by: Beata Hlavenková
- Country of origin: Czech Republic
- Original language: Czech

Production
- Producer: Kamila Hlochová
- Cinematography: Marek Dvořák
- Editor: Jakub Hejna
- Running time: 154 minutes

Original release
- Release: 27 May – 3 June 2018

Dukla 61 is a 2018 Czech disaster film directed by David Ondříček. The film is set in 1961 when a mining disaster at Dukla Mine in Dolní Suchá killed 108 miners. The film focuses on a family of a man who works at the mine along with his son. The film premiered at Finále Plzeň Film Festival. The first part was broadcast on 27 May 2018. It was viewed by 952,000 people. The second part was broadcast on 3 June 2018 and was viewed by 1,130,000 people.

== Plot ==
The film focuses on the Šlachta family. Milan is a miner in a local Dukla mine. His wife Marie takes care of the family's household. Their oldest son Petr studies in Prague. Milan's best friend Pavel dies in a mine accident while Milan barely survives.

The incident leaves him with anxiety attacks whenever he's in a mine. Petr returns home and brings his pregnant girlfriend with him, he decides to take care for her and their child. He wants to work at the Dukla mine. This angers his parents who want him to return to his studies.

The next day he goes to work with Milan. Petr's first day is tough as he isn't accustomed to the harsh conditions in the mine. Milan is promoted and is tasked with supervising of a new seam.

Petr is unable to eat lunch when he returns home, his hands are shaking too much. Marie and Jana are afraid that he won't survive working in the mine. Marie tries to convince Jana to have an abortion. This leads to tension between Petr and his parents.

Petr eventually starts to like his job in the mine and befriends other miners - Eda Slonka, Attila Kovács, Josef Polok, Kafura, Cyril and Vladimír Pawlas. Meanwhile Milan finds out that his superiors, Kotas and Toman, violated safety regulations in the new seam and had installed wooden doors instead of concrete one.

A minor fire erupts there and two miners almost die. Milan and Ševčík, manage to save them but Milan suffers an anxiety attack. He has an argument with Kotas, who then transfers Milan to a worse position. Milan's new payment isn't enough to provide his family but Petr decides to financially help.

Petr goes to the pub with other miners. He gets drunk and tries to force himself onto Jana. She defends herself and Petr goes to a morning shift.

Milan promises Jana that he will talk to Petr. This leads to an argument between Jana and Marie. Milan finds out that Marie had an abortion in past. They argue and Milan angrily leaves the apartment.

He meets Kotas and apologises so that he can get a better position to provide for his family. He then talks to Petr and berates him for what he did to Jana. Petr says it won't happen again but refuses to return to studies as he likes the job in the mine. Petr then decides to substitute a sick colleague at the afternoon shift.

Jan meanwhile leaves the apartment and goes to the Dukla mine to talk with Petr. She wants to leave his parents. The doorkeeper doesn't let her into the mine area. She waits in front of the gate.

Meanwhile a fire erupts in the mine and smoke is quickly spreading through the wooden door at the new seam. Dispatcher at first believes it's a false alarm so it take a while before rescuers are brought in. Milan quickly realises that miners are unaware of the danger and so he smuggles himself into the mine despite his anxiety attack.

While he goes through tunnels, he suffers another anxiety attack but eventually finds miners including Petr. He warns them and decides to lead them to safety but the way is cut but large section filled with smoke. The group must run through the area but Milan breaks his leg on the way. He forces Petr to run without him but Petr suffocates before he can reach the end of the tunnel. He dies a few moments before he can be saved by rescuers.

Meanwhile families of miners gather in front of the gate of the mine. Marie meets Jana there. Rescuers are forced to seal off sections affected by the fire to prevent an explosion. Kotas and Toman are forced make a list of miners who died in the accident.

108 miners died, including Milan and Petr. Kafura, Polok, Cyril and Pawlas die in the accident as well while Kovács and Slonka survive. Marie and Jana then live together in the apartment and take care of the rest of the children. Meanwhile the mine is put again in the work. Miner Slonka is offered Milan's previous position.

== Cast ==
- Marek Taclík as Milan Šlachta
- Martha Issová as Marie Šlachtová
- Oskar Hes as Petr Šlachta
- Antonie Formanová as Jana Weissová
- Peter Nádasdi as Attila Kovacs
- Jiří Langmajer as Kotas
- Robert Mikluš as Eda Slonka
- Martin Myšička as Ing. Václav Toman
- Václav Neužil as Ing. Mirek Ševčík
- Lucie Žáčková as Květa
- Pavel Batěk as Hadrava
- Tomáš Bambušek as Kafura
- Izabela Firlová as Anežka
- Petr Buchta as Cyril
- Jiří Sedláček as Vladimir Pawlas
- Štěpán Kozub as Josef Polok

== Reception ==
The film has received very positive reviews from critics and audiences. It holds 88% at Kinobox. The film became the best rated Czech film of the first half of 2018.
