= Patrimony (film) =

2018 Czech comedy film

- Film poster
- Czech: Tátova volha
- Directed by: Jiří Vejdělek
- Written by: Jiří Vejdělek
- Release date: 8 March 2018
- Running time: 90 minutes
- Country: Czech Republic
- Language: Czech
- Box office: 37,577,863 CZK

Patrimony (Czech: Tátova volha) is a 2018 Czech comedy film directed by Jiří Vejdělek.

== Cast ==
- Eliška Balzerová as Eva
- Tatiana Vilhelmová as Tereza
- Vilma Cibulková as Kamila
- Eva Holubová
- Hana Maciuchová
- Emília Vášáryová
- Martin Myšička as Tereza's Husband
- Bolek Polívka as Ludvík
- Jana Plodková
- Václav Neužil
- Dominika Frydrychová
- Ivana Uhlířová
