= Hudek =

Hudek is a surname. Notable people with the surname include:

- John Hudek (born 1966), American baseball player
- Sarah Hudek (born 1997), American softball player

== See also ==
- Hádek
