= Hádek =

Hádek (feminine: Hádková) is a Czech surname. It is a diminutive of the surname Had, derived from the Czech word had, which means 'snake'. Notable people with the surname include:

- Jan Hádek (born 1945), Czech motorcycle speedway rider
- Kryštof Hádek (born 1982), Czech actor
- Matěj Hádek (born 1975), Czech actor
- Michael Hádek (born 1990), Czech motorcycle speedway rider
