= Saša Rašilov (born 1972) =

Czech film and stage actor (born 1972)

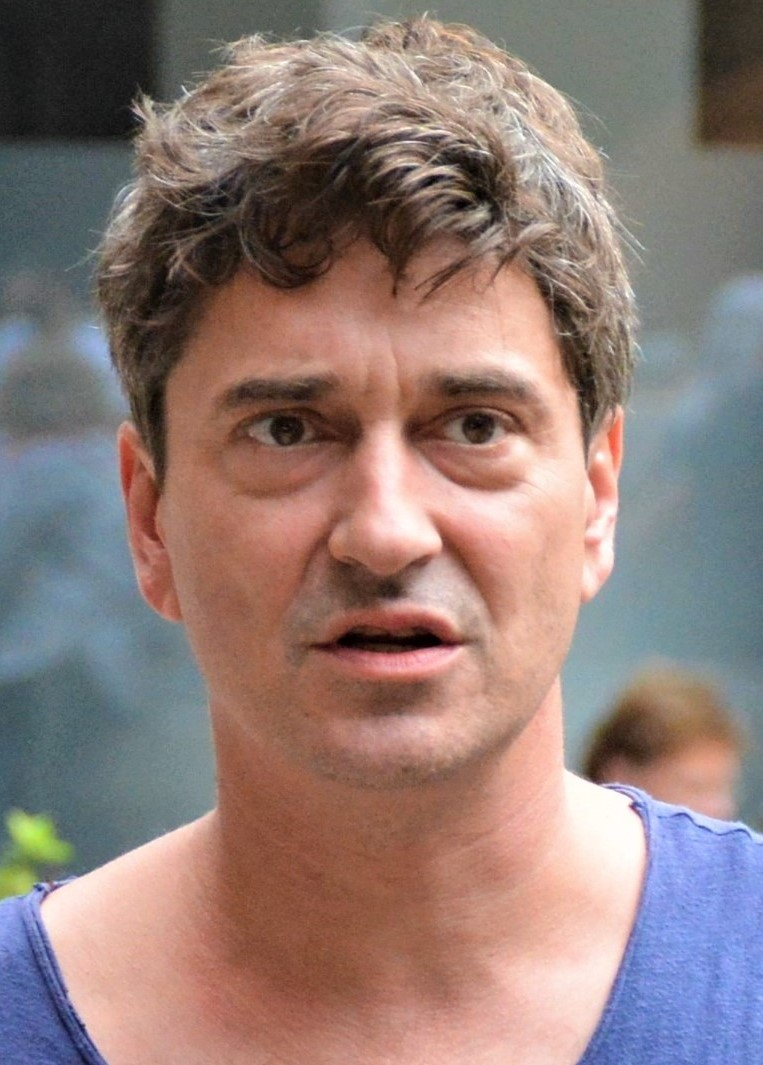
- Saša Rašilov in 2018
- Born: Alexandr Rašilov; 26 July 1972 (age 53); Prague, Czechoslovakia
- Occupation: Actor
- Years active: 1983–present
- Spouse: Vanda Hybnerová (until 2014)
- Relatives: Saša Rašilov (grandfather)

Saša Rašilov (born Alexandr Rašilov, 26 July 1972) is a Czech film and stage actor.

== Biography ==
He studied at the Faculty of Theatre in Prague, later performing on stage at theatres including the Theatre on the Balustrade.

He is the grandson and namesake of Czechoslovak actor Saša Rašilov (1891–1955).

He was married to actress Vanda Hybnerová, with whom he has two daughters, between 1993 and 2014.

His younger brother Václav Rašilov (born 1976) is an actor as well.

== Selected filmography ==
- Big Beat (1993)
- Loners (2000)
- Rodinná pouta (television, 2006)
- ROMing (2007)
- Velmi křehké vztahy (television, 2007–2009)
- Hranaři (2011)
- The Little Man (2015)
- Arvéd (2022)
- Na horách (2025)
