= We Have Never Been Modern (film) =

- Directed by: Matěj Chlupáček
- Written by: Miro Šifra
- Produced by: Matěj Chlupáček
- Starring: Eliška Křenková
- Cinematography: Martin Douba
- Edited by: Pavel Hrdlička
- Music by: Simon Goff
- Distributed by: Bontonfilm
- Release dates: 1 July 2023 (Karlovy Vary); 5 October 2023 (Czech Republic)
- Running time: 117 minutes
- Countries: Czech Republic; Slovakia
- Language: Czech
- Budget: 90 million CZK
- Box office: 7,783,801 CZK

We Have Never Been Modern (Czech: Úsvit, lit. 'Dawn') is a 2023 crime drama film directed by Matěj Chlupáček and written Miro Šifra. We Have Never Been Modern is Chlupaček's second feature film, defined by him as "a detective story with a female protagonist who is not a police officer or an investigator, but while everyone else draws conclusions according to what suits them, she is the only one who wants to find out the truth". The film title quotes the eponymous book by French philosopher Bruno Latour.

== Plot ==
The film is set in 1937. A married couple, a pregnant former medical student and a factory director, arrive in the town of Svit in the Spiš Region of Slovakia. Together with other Bata employees, they are to build a new town modeled on Zlín. However, the plan is thwarted by a mysterious discovery on the factory premises. Helena Hauptová, the former medical student, is the only person who is interested in uncovering the truth, while the others come to terms with the story of suspected sabotage by Communist elements in the factory.

Among other things, the film focuses on the themes of intersexuality, especially the topic of hermaphroditism, relatively unexplored at the time. The film also deals more generally with the topic of otherness and exclusion, as Helena Hauptová finds herself as a woman in a purely male and male-dominated environment.

== Cast ==
- Eliška Křenková as Helena Hauptová; Alois's wife
- Miloslav König as Alois Haupt; Helena's husband
- Richard Langdon as Alexander "Saša" Matula
- Milan Ondrík as investigator Robert
- Marián Mitaš as investigator n. 2
- Luboš Veselý as doctor
- Martha Issová as Svit employee
- Ladislav Hampl as Jan Antonín Baťa

== Production ==
Filming began in May 2022 in Lysá nad Labem in the period scenery of the Art Deco Benies villa. Filming ended in September 2022, the film was initially set to enter theatres on November 16, 2023. It premiered on 1 July 2023 during Karlovy Vary International Film Festival with theatrical premiere on 5 October 2023.

== Gallery ==
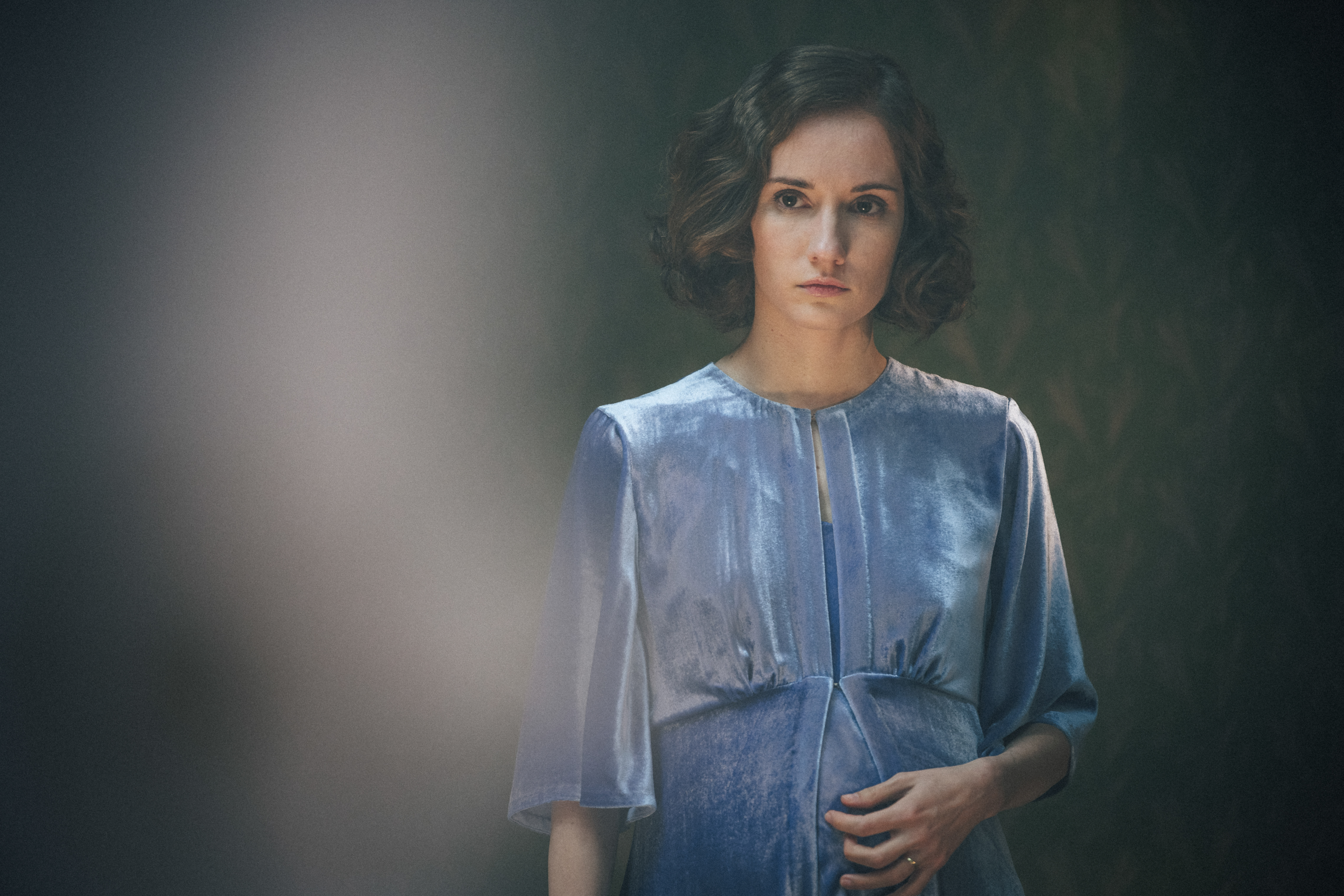
Still from the film with Eliška Křenková in a leading role

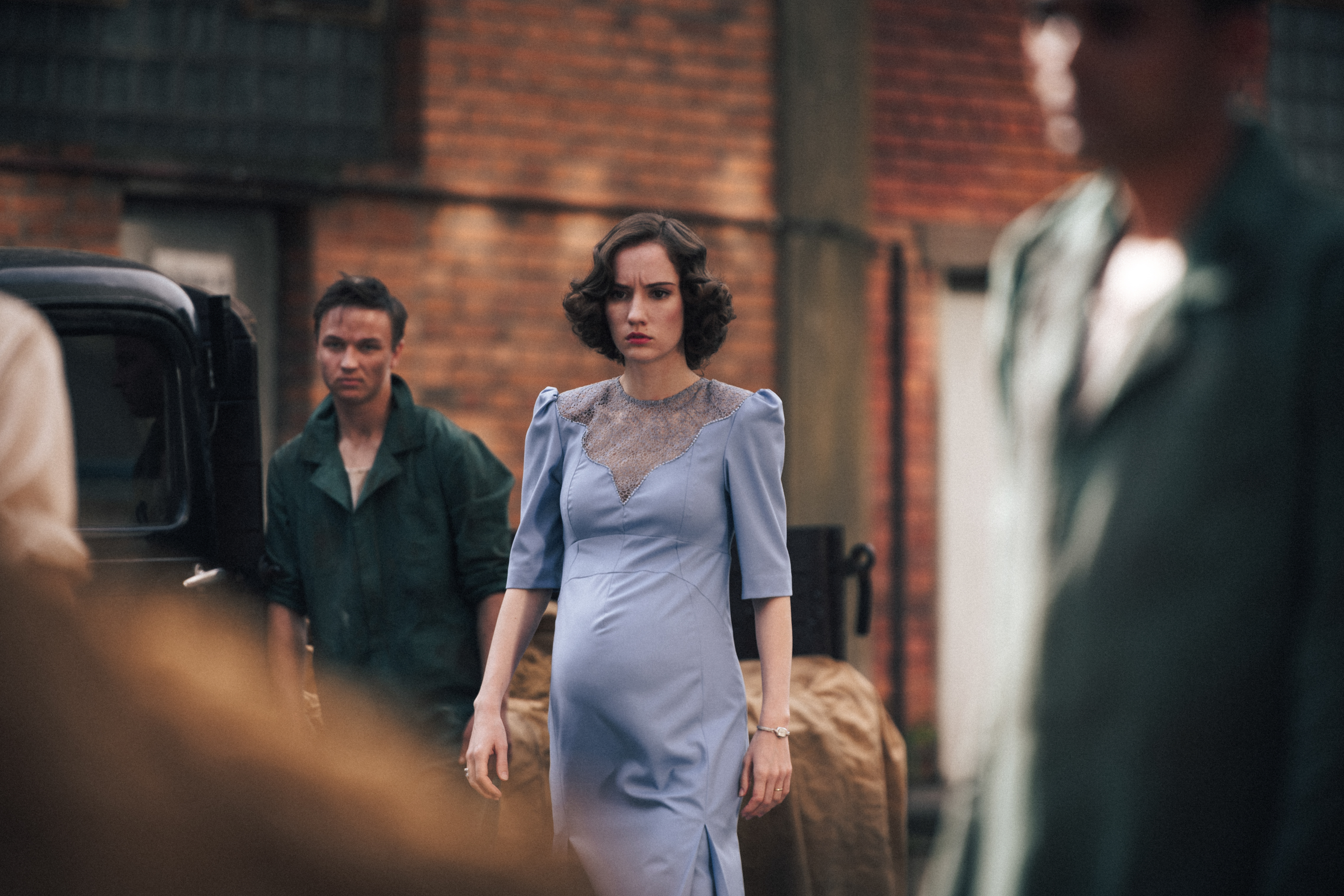
Still from the film with Eliška Křenková in a leading role

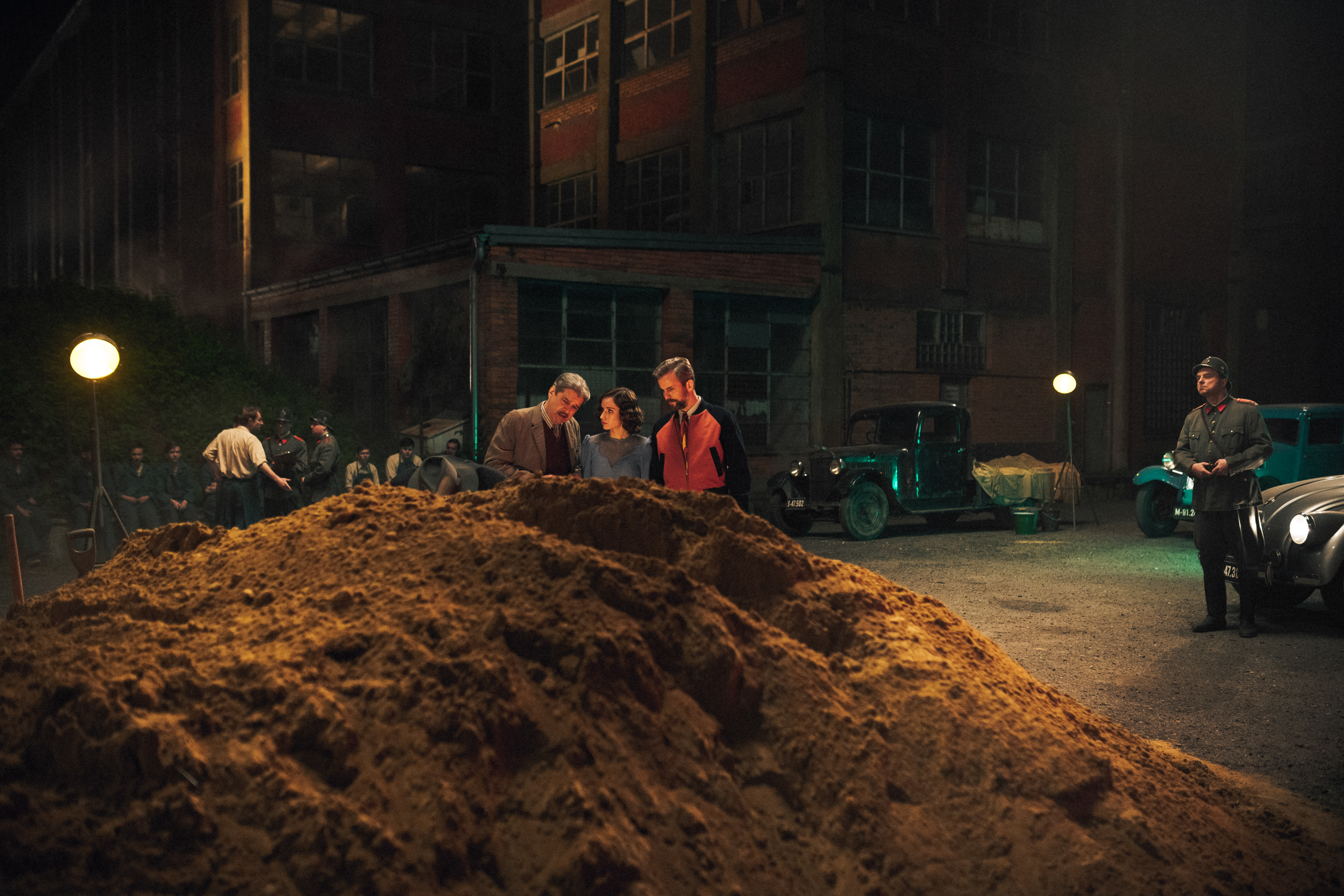
Still from the film, night scene

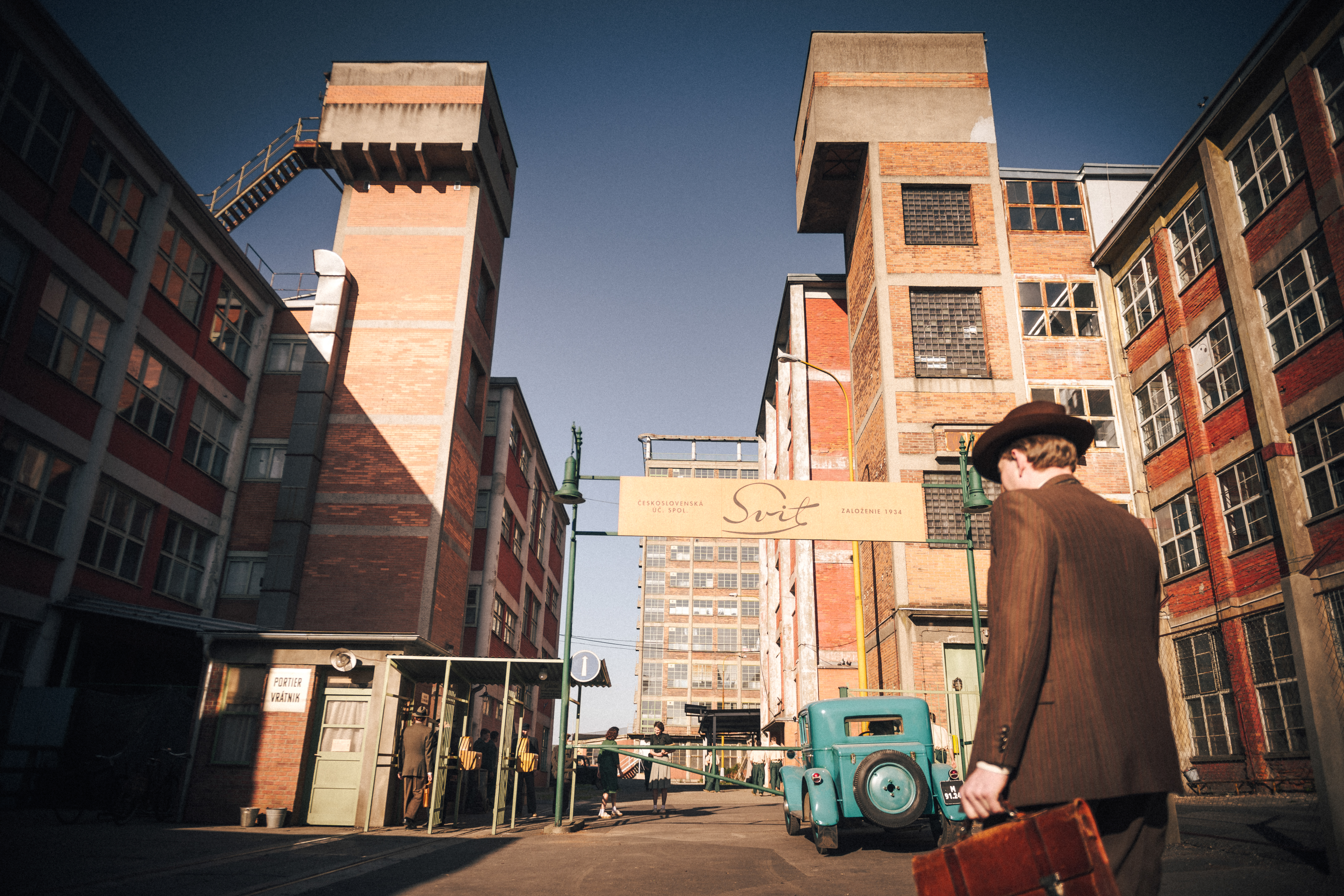
Still from the film, industrial buildings in Zlín

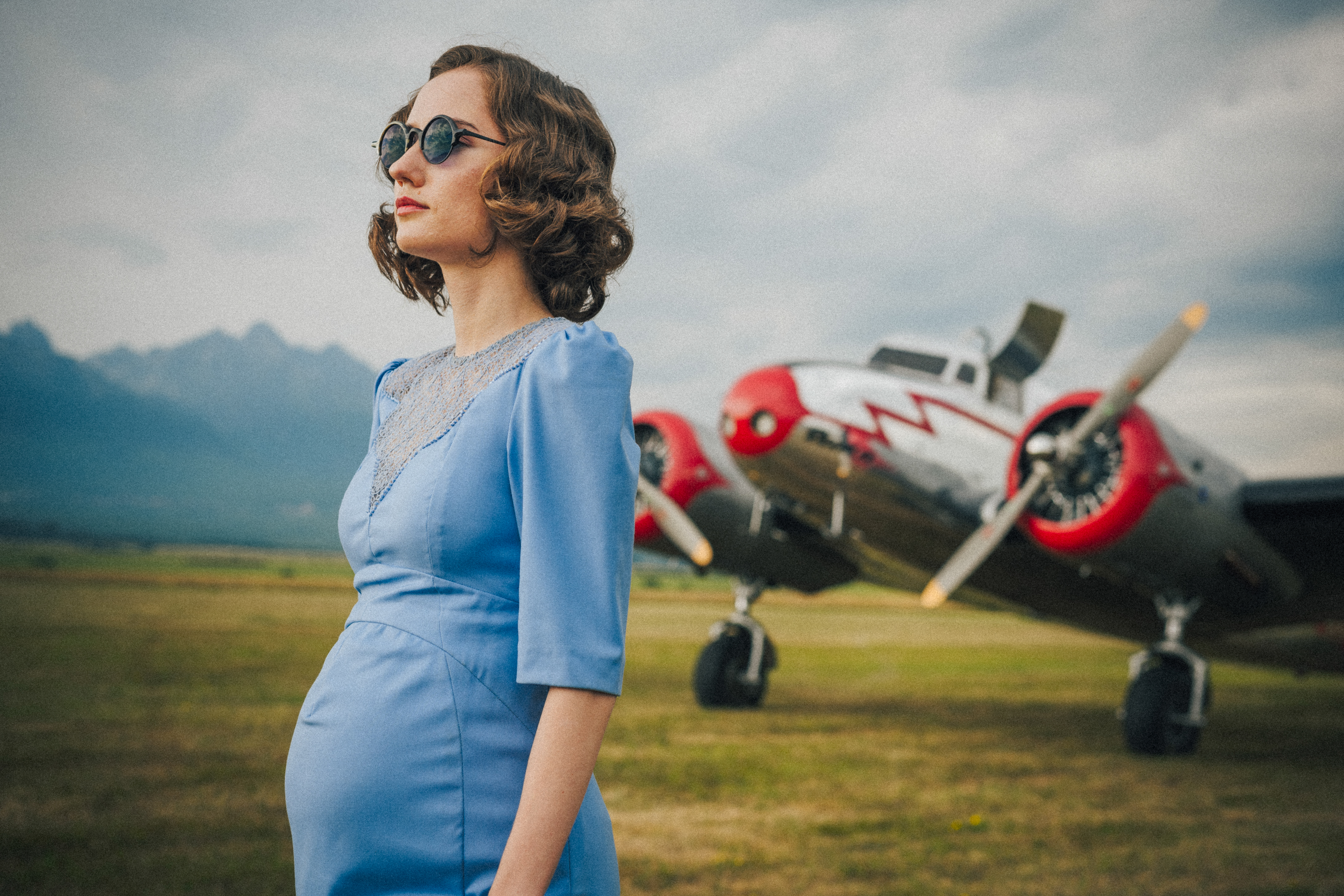
Still from the film with Eliška Křenková in a leading role

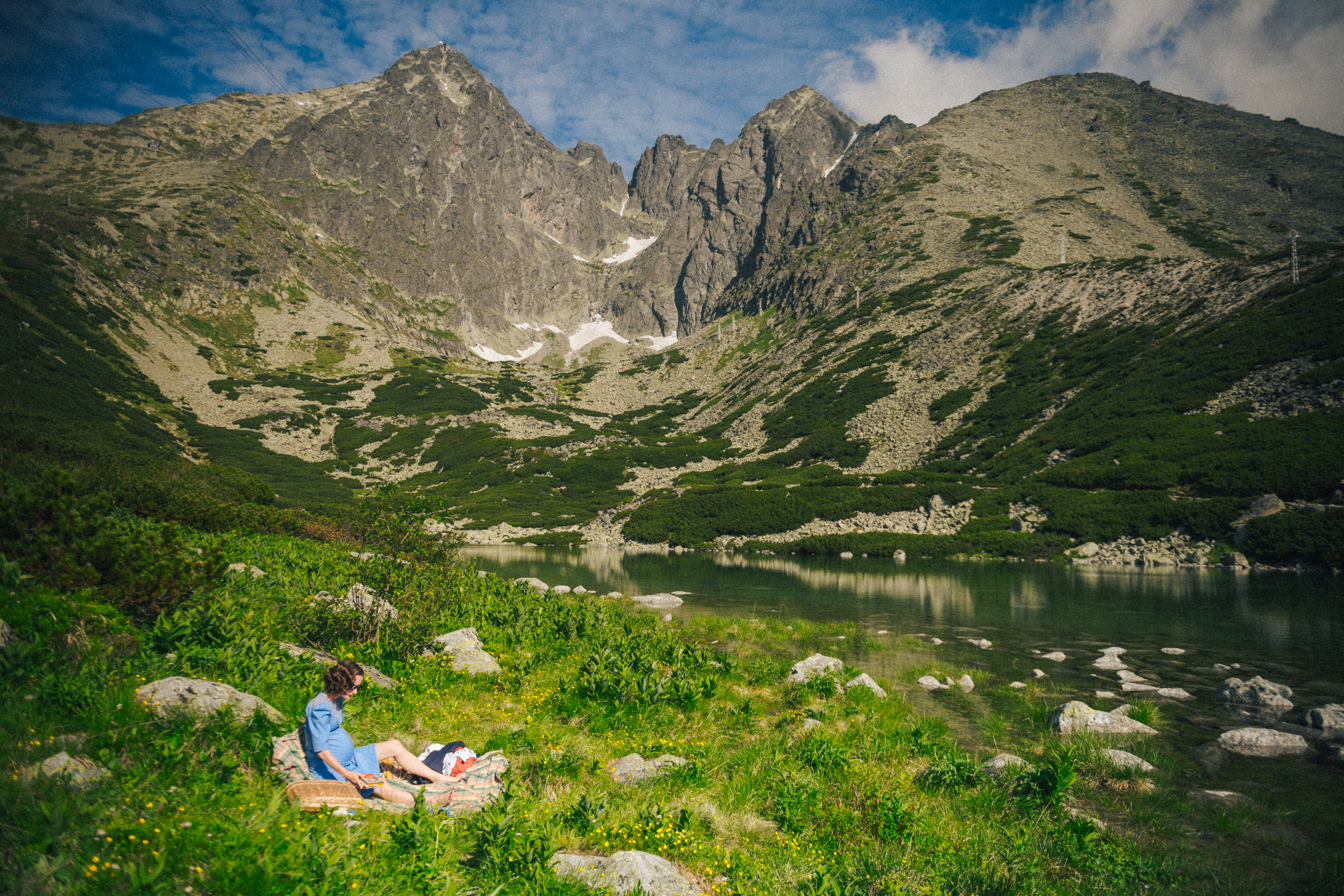
Still from the film, High Tatras
