= Lenka Termerová =

Czech actress

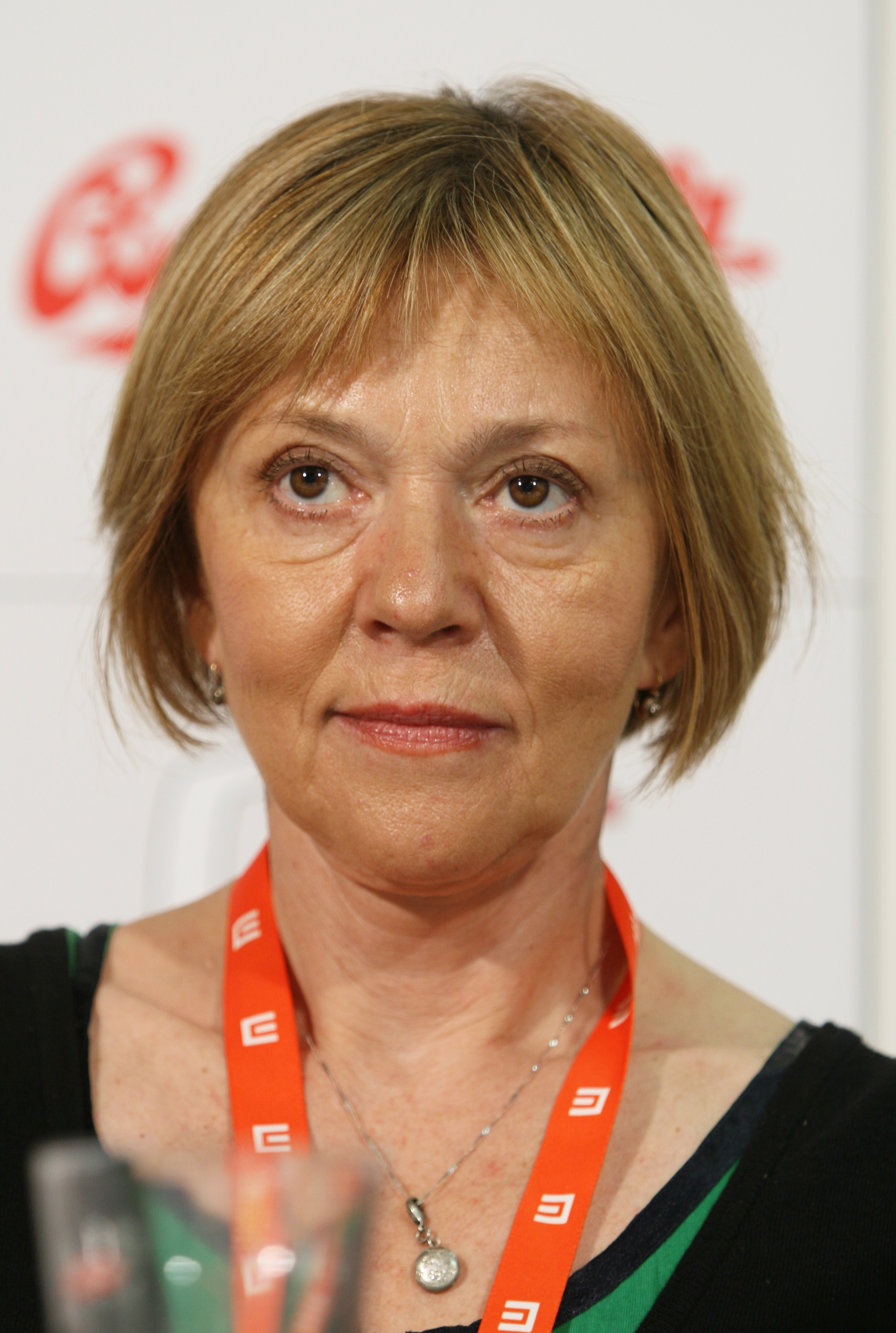
- Born: 12 July 1947 (age 79); Hradec Králové, Czechoslovakia
- Occupation: Actress
- Years active: 1969-present
- Children: Martha Issová

Lenka Termerová (born 12 July 1947) is a Czech film, stage and television actress. She won the Czech Lion award for Best Supporting Actress in 2008 for her role in the film Děti noci. She is the mother of actress Martha Issová.

== Acting career ==
Termerová studied at the Faculty of Theatre in Prague. She went on to perform in the Divadlo Petra Bezruče in Ostrava, before moving to Studio Ypsilon in Prague in 1981. Termerová won the Czech Lion award for Best Supporting Actress in 2008 for her role in the film Děti noci. She had a starring role in the Prima television series Velmi křehké vztahy, which was originally broadcast between 2007 and 2009. Termerová was diagnosed with breast cancer in 2009.

== Selected filmography ==
- Žena za pultem (television, 1978)
- The Conception of My Younger Brother (2000)
- Rodinná pouta (television, 2004–2006)
- Cops and Robbers (television, 2007)
- Velmi křehké vztahy (television, 2007–2009)
- Děti noci (2008)
- Doktoři z Počátků (television, 2013–)
- Five Plums (2026)
