= Grandhotel =

- Directed by: David Ondříček
- Written by: Pavel Jech; Jaroslav Rudis; Marek Epstein
- Produced by: Krystof Mucha; David Ondricek
- Starring: Marek Taclík; Klára Issová
- Cinematography: Richard Rericha
- Edited by: Michal Lánsky
- Music by: Jan P. Muchow
- Release date: 12 October 2006
- Running time: 97 minutes
- Country: Czech Republic
- Language: Czech

Grandhotel is a Czech comedy film directed by David Ondříček. It was released in 2006.

== Cast ==
- Marek Taclík - Fleischman
- Klára Issová - Ilja
- Jaroslav Plesl - Patka
- Jaromír Dulava - Jégr
- Ladislav Mrkvička - Franz
- Dita Zábranská - Zuzana
- Věra Havelková - Helena Rákosová
- Kryštof Mucha - Milan Lisý
- Kamil Halbich - Doctor
- Tatiana Vilhelmová - Nurse
- Igor Chmela - Bartender
- Jan Španbauer - Inspector
- Ondrej Nerud - Morgue Employee
