= David Ondříček =

Czech film director and screenwriter

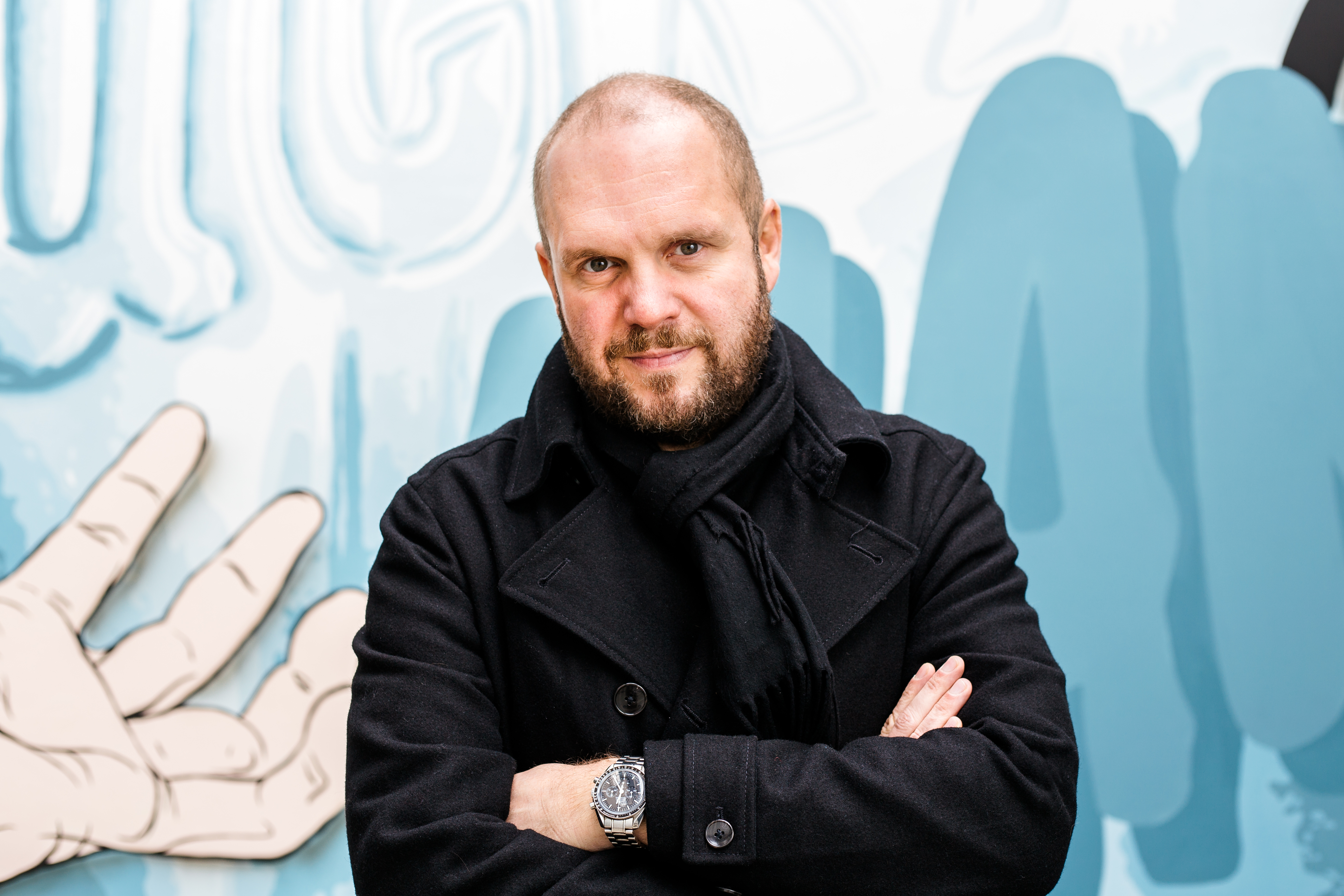
- David Ondříček (2014)
- Born: 23 June 1969 (age 57); Prague, Czechoslovakia
- Occupations: Film director, screenwriter, film producer
- Years active: 1996–present
- Spouse: Martha Issová
- Children: 3
- Relatives: Miroslav Ondříček (father)

David Ondříček (born 23 June 1969) is a Czech film director, screenwriter and producer.

Ondříček is the son of the late Czech cinematographer Miroslav Ondříček. He attended the Film and TV School of the Academy of Performing Arts in Prague from 1987 to 1992.

He made his feature directorial debut with Whisper (Šeptej, 1996), which was screened in the Tiger Award competition at the International Film Festival Rotterdam.

In 1999, Ondříček founded Lucky Man Films, a film production company. With this company, he produced his second feature film, Loners (Samotáři, 2000). The film was a major cultural and commercial success in the Czech Republic, drawing over 544,000 viewers. It garnered significant international attention, including the Audience Award at festivals in Thessaloniki and Warsaw, special jury recognition at the Mannheim-Heidelberg International Filmfestival, and screenings at film festivals in Toronto, Busan, and Reykjavík.

Ondříček co-wrote the screenplay for his next feature, One Hand Can't Clap (Jedna ruka netleská, 2003) alongside Jiří Macháček; the film attracted over 507,000 viewers in Czech cinemas.

In 2006, he directed Grandhotel, based on the screenplay and novel of the same name by Jaroslav Rudiš, which premiered at the Berlin International Film Festival (Berlinale).

His 2012 crime drama In the Shadow (Ve stínu) earned him Best Director Czech Lion Award and Best Director honor at the Czech Film Critics’ Awards. The film served as the Czech Republic's official submission for the Academy Award for Best Foreign Language Film. That same year, Variety magazine included him in their "10 Directors to Watch" list.

In 2018, he directed two-part television film Dukla 61, which won Best Television Film or Miniseries at the 2018 Czech Lion Awards and earned a nomination at the Monte-Carlo Television Festival.

In 2021, he won the Best Director Czech Lion Award for biographical sports drama Zátopek. The film won eight Czech Lion Awards — including Best Film. It was the Czech candidate for the Academy Award for Best International Feature Film and won the Audience Award at the Karlovy Vary International Film Festival.

In 2022, he directed TV miniseries The King of Šumava: The Phantom of the Dark Land (Král Šumavy: Fantom temného kraje, 2022). He served as a producer on its follow-up season, Agent chodec (2025).

As of 2026, he is preparing movie Changes (Kluci to vidí jinak než holky), a generational drama that serves as a loose thematic successor to his debut hit, Loners.

In his capacity as a producer, Ondříček has been involved in major international projects, including the historical thriller Anthropoid (2016) directed by Sean Ellis and Petr Zelenka's Lost in Munich (Ztraceni v Mnichově). Beyond feature-length projects, he is also an active creator of television commercials and music videos, collaborating with artists such as Toyen, Priessnitz, and Mig 21.

Ondříček has one son (born 2005) and two daughters (born 2012 and 2018). His second wife is actress Martha Issová.

== Selected filmography ==
Film
Year	Title	Original Title	Role	Notes
2026	Changes	Kluci to vidí jinak než holky	director, screenwriter, producer	
2021	Zátopek	Zátopek	director, co-screenwriter, producer	
2018	Dukla 61	Dukla 61	director	
2012	In the Shadow	Ve stínu	director, co-screenwriter, producer	
2006	Grandhotel	Grandhotel	director, producer	
2003	One Hand Can't Clap	Jedna ruka netleská	director, co-screenwriter, producer	
2000	Loners	Samotáři	director, producer	
1996	Whisper	Šeptej	director, co-screenwriter	this was Ondříček's debut film
