= Restore Point =

- Czech poster
- Directed by: Robert Hloz
- Written by: Tomislav Čečka; Robert Hloz; Zdeněk Jecelín
- Produced by: Jan Kallista
- Starring: Andrea Mohylová; Matěj Hádek; Václav Neužil
- Cinematography: Filip Marek
- Edited by: Jarosław Kamiński
- Music by: Jan Šléška
- Distributed by: Bioscop/AQS (Czech Republic); Continental film (Slovakia); XYZ Films (worldwide)
- Release dates: 3 July 2023 (Karlovy Vary); 21 September 2023 (Czech Republic)
- Running time: 111 minutes
- Countries: Czech Republic; Slovakia; Poland; Serbia
- Language: Czech
- Budget: 60 Million CZK
- Box office: 19,611,429 CZK (Czech Republic)

Restore Point (Czech: Bod obnovy) is a 2023 cyberpunk science-fiction thriller film directed by Czech director Robert Hloz in his directorial debut. The film was co-produced by the Czech Republic, Slovakia, Poland and Serbia.

The film's premiere took place during 2023 Karlovy Vary International Film Festival and was attended by Czech president Petr Pavel.

== Plot ==
In 2041, due to social inequality and with violent crime on the rise, people in Central Europe have a constitutional right to be revived in the event of unnatural death. When someone dies violently, Restore Point's innovative technology resuscitates them, provided the person has routinely backed up their brain data every 48 hours. The facility is operated by the Institute of Restoration. Young detective Emma (Em) Trochinowska, an ambitious and well-respected police officer, is on the trail of a group called "River of Life" who are rebelling against "unnatural" resurrection technology by disrupting civilian life through terrorist attacks.

When the scientist who developed recovery technology, David Kurlstat, and his wife are murdered, Em is puzzled that he, of all people, hasn't had a valid recovery point with which to be revived.

== Cast ==
- Andrea Mohylová as Emma 'Em' Trochinowska
- Matěj Hádek as David Kurlstat
- Václav Neužil as Agent Mansfeld
- Milan Ondrík as Viktor Toffer
- Karel Dobrý as Rohan
- Agáta Kryštůfková as Dr. Petra Legerová
- Katarzyna Zawadzka as Kristina Kurlstatova
- Jan Vlasák as Captain
- Iveta Dušková as Dudková
- Richard Stanke as Richard
- Adam Vacula as Peter Trochinowski
- Jan Jankovský as Jan Zima

== Production ==
Restore Point was directed by Robert Hloz in his directorial debut (after his short films Mlýn, Numbers, Prechodne Vedomi and Liars).

The screenplay was written by Tomislav Čečka and Zdeněk Jecelín.

=== Cast and shooting ===
Czech theatre, film and television actor and Czech Lion Award winner Karel Dobrý, known for his role as the villain Matthias in the film Mission: Impossible, from the science fiction miniseries Frank Herbert's Children of Dune and the TV series Carnival Row, appears as Rohan the head of Restore Point Institute while Agáta Kryštůfková was cast as his assistant. Polish actor Tomasz Kot, theatre and film actor known for films such as The Spur, Cold War - The Latitude of Love, A Perfect Enemy and Leave No Traces, has another leading role. Newcomer Andrea Mohylová took on the female lead, playing Emma Trochinowska, or "Em" for short. Matěj Hádek plays the research head of the institute, David Kurlstat, who was murdered together with his wife and whose case is Em investigating. Jan Vlasák plays Em's superior and Václav Neužil appears as a colleague from another department Other roles include Milan Ondrík as a fugitive terrorist and Lech Dyblik in a minor role.

Principal photography took place in the Czech Republic, Slovakia and Poland.

=== Release ===
Restore Point premiered on July 3, 2023, at the Karlovy Vary International Film Festival. Its screenings began at the Neuchâtel International Fantastic Film Festival the following day. Subsequently the film was also shown at the Fantasia International Film Festival in late July and early August 2023.

Restore Point was released in Czech cinemas on September 21, 2023.

XYZ Films was named as a distributor in various markets (including the United States, Canada, Australia, Germany or Austria). The film was released on Netflix and home media on 24 January 2024.

== Reception ==
=== Critical response ===
The film was described as the "Czech Blade Runner" by critics for its retro-futuristic cyberpunk aesthetic. The Guardian described the film as a "competent copy but unmistakably synthetic", "bolted together from so many borrowed parts" and "forgets to locate its own philosophical kernel" and received three out of five stars.

=== Accolades ===
Award	Category	Subject	Result
Neuchâtel International Fantastic Film Festival 2023	International competition	Restore Point	Nominated
