= The Seven Ravens (2015 film) =

2015 Czech fairy tale film

- Film poster
- Directed by: Alice Nellis
- Written by: Alice Nellis
- Produced by: Ester Honysova; Ľubomír Slivka; Katarína Vanžurová
- Starring: Martha Issová; Lukáš Příkazký
- Cinematography: Matěj Cibulka
- Edited by: Filip Issa
- Music by: Vašo Patejdl
- Distributed by: Bohemia Motion Pictures; Mountain River Films; World Sales
- Release date: 28 May 2015
- Running time: 103 minutes
- Countries: Czechia; Slovakia
- Language: Czech
- Budget: 48 million CZK

The Seven Ravens (Czech: Sedmero krkavců) is a 2015 Czech-Slovak fairy tale film directed by Alice Nellis. The Seven Ravens is the story of a young woman who takes it upon herself to save her brothers and rid them of a curse which they were put under by their mother. It's a story about courage, endurance, and about the power of words, truth, and love. It's the story of how parents' mistakes fall on their children's shoulders, and how these children may either repeat them or correct them.

The film is primarily based on a story by Božena Němcová. It also uses elements from the Brothers Grimm's version of the same fairy tale.

== Plot ==
The heroine of the story is a young woman, Bohdanka (Martha Issová), who was born into the grief-stricken family of a baker, whose wife, years ago, in a fit of rage, curses their seven sons into ravens. The parents keep this family tragedy a secret from their daughter. When Bohdanka, on the threshold of adulthood, learns about her family's curse, she decides she has to save her brothers. The local witch advises her that she must weave her brothers shirts. But not just any shirts – alone, without anyone's help, she must harvest nettle, spin the thread, weave the cloth, and make every stitch on the shirts herself. She must do all this without uttering a single word.

Bohdanka sets out on a journey during which she not only tries to save her brothers, but during which she also gets to know herself, her personality, her flaws, her desires. She meets the shy and stuttering prince Bartoloměj and, thanks to a magic comb the witch lent her, she is able wordlessly to gather fragments of the past and learn the sad fate of prince Bartoloměj's kingdom.

The more Bohdanka and Bartoloměj get to know each other, the closer they become. Bartoloměj takes Bohdanka to the castle, and Bohdanka thus gets to look into life at the court, ruled by Queen Alexandra, Bartoloměj's mother. Alexandra's plan has always been to rid her son Bartoloměj of his right to the throne, so that her younger son Norbert could become king instead. Bohdanka's presence at the castle disrupts this plan, as Bartoloměj, in his growing love for Bohdanka, has been gaining confidence and has even begun to behave like a future king.

At first, Alexandra tries to get rid of the mute girl as easily as possible, but when Bartoloměj asks for Bohdanka's hand in marriage, Alexandra feigns happiness for the young couple and begins working on a more intricate plan to set Bartoloměj, along with the entire royal court, against Bohdanka.

Bohdanka sees through Alexandra's intentions – partially thanks to the magic comb which lets her look into the past - but at a crucial moment, when Bohdanka has to decide whether to finish her task and save her brothers, or to speak and explain the misunderstanding which is to separate her from Bartoloměj, Bohdanka decides to continue her work, risking her life but keeping her promise. Only once she finishes her task and frees her brothers is she finally able to explain everything.

We find out that Queen Alexandra never had the right to the throne, came to be queen by using lies and intrigue and that her latest ploy was to get rid of Bartoloměj and Bohdanka by force, so as to retain her power.

The story ends with fragments of the past fitting together to create the whole picture, which shows all the characters in a true light and uncovers their deepest motives. Bartoloměj becomes king, former Queen Alexandra ends up in exile, and Bohdanka's brothers are reunited with their much-tried parents.

== Cast ==
- Martha Issová as Bohdanka
- Sabina Remundová as Queen Alexandra
- Lukáš Příkazký as Prince Bartolomej
- Václav Neužil as Prince Norbert
- Zuzana Bydžovská as Witch Gabriela
- Erika Stárková as Queen Gabriela
- Jana Oľhová as Bohdanka's Mother
- Tatjana Medvecká as Mother (voice)
- Marián Geišberg as Bohdanka's Father
- Svatopluk Skopal as Father (voice)
- Juraj Hrčka as King
- Miro Noga as Duke
- Petr Pospíchal as Duke (voice)
- Csongor Kassai as Priest
- Vladimír Javorský as Priest (voice)
- Kristína Svarinská as Maid Marie
- Petra Horváthová as Maid Marie (voice)

== Awards and nominations ==
The Seven Ravens won Best Stage Design, Best Makeup and Hairstyling, and Best Costume Design at the 2015 Czech Lion Awards, with additional nominations for Best Director, Best Actress, Best Supporting Actress, Best Screenplay, Best Music, and Best Sound.

The Seven Ravens also won Best Cinematography and Best Background Music at the 2015 Indian Cine Film Festival.
