= Tony, Shelly and the Magic Light =

- Theatrical release poster
- Directed by: Filip Pošivač
- Written by: Jana Šrámková
- Produced by: Pavla Janoušková Kubečková; Jakub Viktorín
- Cinematography: Denisa Buranová
- Music by: Ádám Balázs
- Production companies: Nutprodukce; Nutprodukcia; Czech Television; Radio and Television of Slovakia; Kouzelná animace Filmfabriq
- Distributed by: CinemArt (Czech Republic); Continental Film (Slovakia); LevelK (international)
- Release dates: 1 June 2023 (Zlín Festival); 13 June 2023 (Annecy); 2 November 2023 (Czech Republic); 9 November 2023 (Slovakia)
- Running time: 82 minutes
- Countries: Czech Republic; Slovakia; Hungary
- Language: Czech
- Budget: 45,000,000 CZK
- Box office: 1,450,000 EUR

Tony, Shelly and the Magic Light (Czech: Tonda, Slávka a kouzelné světlo; Hungarian: Tomi, Polli és a Varázsfény; Slovak: Tonko, Slávka a kúzelné svetlo) is a 2023 animated adventure fantasy film directed by Czech director Filip Pošivač. It has won Contrechamps category award at Annecy International Animation Film Festival.

== Plot ==
11-year-old Tony has a unique ability - he is glowing since birth. His parents try to keep him at home to protect him from the outside world but one day he meets Shelly, a mysterious girl who moves into one of the neighboring apartments before the Christmas holidays. Tony finds his first real friend in her and someone to whom he can can reveal fantasy world in inside his pillow bunker. Shelly in turn, shows Tony a miraculous flashlight with which she can create amazing images and magical worlds from ordinary things that only they can see. Together they set for the search of the origin of mysterious wisps of darkness that drain the sunlight from their house.

== Voice actors ==
Character	Czech voice	Slovak voice	Hungarian voice
Tony	Michael Polák	Radoslav Kotleba	Martin Gyetvai
Shelly	Antonie Talacková Barešová	Karolína Kubánková	Mili Pesztericz
Mrs. Šímová, Tony's mother	Ivana Uhlířová	Petra Polnišová	Eszter Ónodi
Mr. Šíma, Tony's father	Matěj Hádek	Juraj Kemka	Gergely Kocsis
Silvia Silvestrová, Shelly's mother	Jana Plodková	Soňa Norisová	Judit Schell
Housekeeper	Pavel Nový	Peter Bebjak	Tamás Fodor
Genius Loci	Jaroslav Plesl	Peter Krajčovič	Erik Major
Mrs. Bečková	Sabina Remundová	Oľga Belešová	
Mrs. Haslerková	Eva Holubová	Zuzana Kronerová	Eszter Csákányi
Ernestyna	Linda Křišťálová	Grétka Luprichová	Hegedűs Johanna

== Production and release ==
It is inspired by Pošivač's animated short film Shining Tony. Film's woking title was Tony, Shelly and Genius. The film was produced by Czech company nuprodukce and Slovak company nutprodukcia. It was coproduced by Czech Television, Radio and Television of Slovakia, Kouzelná animace and Hungarian company Filmfabriq. The film was supported by Czech film fund.

The film premiered at 2023 Zlín Film Festival. Exposition showing production of the film was part of the festival. The first trailer was released on 10 August 2023. It is set to enter Czech theatres on 2 November 2023. Slovak premiere is set for 7 December 2023. On 20 September 2023 the final trailer was released.

== Reception ==
In 2018 it has won the Eurimages Co-production Development Award at Cinekid and received €20,000. Jury praised "high artistic quality based on traditional European values combined with a modern cinematographic language." The film has won the jury prize in the Contrechamps category award at Annecy International Animation Film Festival.
