= Rodinná pouta =

Czech television series

- Genre: Soap opera
- Starring: Dana Morávková; Tomáš Krejčíř; Klára Jandová; Lenka Termerová; Jan Kačer; Zdeňka Volencová; Miloslav Mejzlík; Saša Rašilov; Jan Révai; Alice Bendová; Martin Zounar; Ivanka Devátá
- Opening theme: Audio Network
- Country of origin: Czech Republic
- No. of seasons: 3
- No. of episodes: 254

Production
- Production companies: PRO TV (2004–2006); Etamp Film Production(2006)

Original release
- Network: Prima
- Release: 23 March 2004 – 27 December 2006

Related
- Velmi křehké vztahy

Rodinná pouta (lit. 'Family Ties') is a Czech soap opera produced and broadcast by Prima and aired from 2004 to 2006. It was the first original series broadcast nationwide in the Czech Republic on a commercial television station; until that time, all original local series had been broadcast by state broadcaster Czech Television, and earlier its predecessor, Czechoslovak Television. The show, which produced 240 episodes over the first two seasons, attracted over a million viewers, becoming Prima's most-watched programme.

== Characters ==
The show follows the lives of the Skála, Rubeš and Boháček families and many other people that live around them.

== Production ==
The first series of Rodinná pouta consisted of 116 episodes and gained a television audience averaging 1.62 million viewers. The second series averaged 1.5 million viewers and consisted of 124 episodes.

The first two series of Rodinná pouta were produced by the company PRO TV. Following the second series, production moved to a different company, called Etamp Film Production, for the third series. This led to PRO TV filing a court case against host network Prima, claiming that this was a breach of their contract. In December 2006, Prima announced that the show would end that month, due to the court case. Many actors of the series were retained to feature in a new Prima series under the name Velmi křehké vztahy, which started in January 2007.

== Awards and nominations ==
For her role as Ivana, actress Zdeňka Žádníková-Volencová was named Discovery of the Year at the 2005 TýTý Awards. The series was nominated for the Best Television Series award at the 2006 TýTý Awards but the award was won by Četnické humoresky.
