= Little Thief =

- Directed by: Ondřej Hudeček
- Written by: Ondřej Hudeček
- Produced by: Tomáš Hrubý
- Starring: Matyáš Řezníček; Václav Neužil; Stanislav Majer; Denisa Barešová; Lukáš Příkazký; Filip Kaňkovský; Petr Borovec; Eva Vrbková; Milan Mikulčík; Jiří Vyorálek
- Cinematography: Ondřej Hudeček
- Music by: Jonatan Pjoni Pastirčák
- Distributed by: Bontonfilm
- Release date: 5 March 2026 (Czech Republic)
- Running time: 118 minutes
- Country: Czech Republic
- Language: Czech
- Box office: 3,155,353 CZK

Little Thief (Czech: Poberta) is a 2026 Czech crime comedy drama film directed by Ondřej Hudeček. The film is about thieves who fake thefts during the pandemic to help failing businesses avoid bankruptcy.

The film premiered in Czech cinemas on March 5, 2026; the film was previewed on February 11, 2026 as part of the Tady Vary program. The film's co-producer is Czech Television.

== Plot ==
Lupyn returns to his hometown after being released from prison. As soon as he warms up to freedom, he is already planning another theft with his buddies, who previously exchanged him for suspended sentences. The ongoing pandemic plays into his hands. The loan shark Asasin and local corrupt police officer, try to find out who is causing harm in their area. Lupyn, on the other hand, needs money for a new life with his love Tamara. He gradually becomes entangled in a spiral of lies and absurd situations.

== Cast ==
- Matyáš Řezníček as thief Lupyn
- Václav Neužil as policeman Čenda
- Stanislav Majer as Aleš Sasín, gangster "Asasín"
- Denisa Barešová as Tamara
- Lukáš Příkazký as Rosťa, Lupyn's buddy
- Filip Kaňkovský as Caigon, Lupyn's buddy
- Petr Borovec as Julian, Lupyn's buddy
- Eva Vrbková as Ilona, Lupyn's mother
- Milan Mikulčík as Gazda
- Jiří Vyorálek
- Anna Prášilová Fialová
- Jiří Štrébl
- Ján Jackuliak as Milan

== Production ==
The film is set and filmed in the director's hometown of Strážnice in Moravian Slovakia region. Actors learned the local dialect before filming. The film was in development for several years. Covid-19 pandemic also entered the production process, the circumstances of which the author later used in the plot of the film.
