= Velmi křehké vztahy =

Velmi křehké vztahy (Very Fragile Relationships) is a Czech TV series Prima, which was broadcast in 2007–2009. It is a continuation of the series Rodinná pouta and falls into the soap opera genre. The main theme is love and relationships, but during the second series, the romantic scenes were reduced and the makers focused more on the crime plot and action scenes.

Velmi křehké vztahy aired from 2 January 2007 until then, the series carried the title Rodinná pouta. However, this naming was legally prohibited. The Family Ties dispute was a dispute between two production companies. The first two series of the series were produced by Pro TV, but the third was commissioned by Prima to Etamp. Pro TV didn't like that, so it asked the court for a preliminary injunction to ban the production. The series continued to be filmed, but already under the name Velmi křehké vztahy. The series has four seasons, the authors are the Bártů sisters.

== Cast ==
Sabina Králová	JUDr. Barbora Strnadová
Alice Bendová	Simona Rubešová (Wágnerová)
Dana Morávková	Andrea Lišková
Roman Štolpa	MUDr. Martin Liška
Jan Révai	Ing. Robert Krátký
Lenka Termerová	Jiřina Rubešová
Jan Kačer	František Rubeš
Zdeňka Volencová	Ivana Rubešová-Kučerová-Hrušková-Sýkorová
Zuzana Dřízhalová	Marcela Rubešová
Otto Kallus	Filip Rubeš
Saša Rašilov	Ing. Jan Skála
Petra Špindlerová	Hana Ziková
Daniel Bambas	JUDr. Petr Černý
Hana Holišová	Anna Pešková (Černá)
Hana Baroňová	Ilona Kudrnová
Kateřina Burianová	Libuše Pešková
Ladislava Něrgešová	Ing. Dagmar Lacinová
Martin Zounar	MUDr. Bořek Wágner
Viktor Limr	MUDr. Lukáš Kratochvíl
Dagmar Bláhová	Eliška Tůmová
Eva Novotná	MUDr. Helena Lacinová
Filip Blažek	mjr. Pavel Vaněk
Filip Rajmont	Oskar Prokeš
Iva Kubelková	Daniela Hartlová (Skálová)
Ivanka Devátá	Božena Wágnerová (Reisová)
Jan Zadražil	MUDr. Ludvík Strnad
Martin Preiss	Kristián Lang
Miloslav Mejzlík	Ing. Hynek Skála
Oldřich Vízner	MUDr. Ludvík Strnad st.
Petr Motloch	MUDr. Evžen Hartl
Rostislav Novák	Oldřich Líbal
Sylva Koblížková	Kristýna Lišková
Nela Boudová	MUDr. Zuzana Trojanová
Lukáš Vašíček	waiter at Langa bar

== Plot ==
=== Season 1 (2007) ===
In the first series, the inheritance from Aunt Katerina was dealt with. In her will, it was said that Rubeš must find a son or daughter by her brother Jiří. If that didn't happen, her favorite niece Andrea would receive the entire inheritance. The Rubes hired a lawyer, Petr Černý, who lived in his grandfather's apartment. Petr met Anna Pešková, a hospital nurse, with whom he fell in love. Anna had a very seriously ill mother who had to undergo chemotherapy. She died at the end of the first series and Anna took her ashes to Paris. Bořivoj Wágner won the procedure for hospital director. His boss was the engineer Krátký, who was his deputy, but he was very interested in the position of director. Filip Rubeš married Simona Wágnerová even though no one agreed to the wedding. However, the marriage did not work out and so Filip drowned himself more and more in alcohol. Simona and Andrea worked in the salon, where the beautician Ilona, who was from the children's home, also works. She used that Simona and told everyone at the Rubeš family that Ilona was the heir they were looking for. Simona faked the genetic tests as well as the heir ring that was the key to the wanted heir. However, her plans were crossed by the lawyer Petr Černý. Andrea started an affair with her doctor Lukáš Kratochvíl. He was married and initially kept his relationship with Andrea a secret from his wife. In the end, there was still a divorce, but a third person unexpectedly entered the idyllic couple. This is Andrea's sister Ivana, whose husband died in a car accident. Throughout the series, none of the sisters had any idea that Dr. Kratochvíl was having a relationship with both of them at the same time. Marcela brother Oldřich came to Prague. Here he fell in love with little sister Stáni. Hynek Skála also had a bad period. He broke up with his partner Hana Zikova, who returned to her ex-husband. After Jan Skála broke up with Maria, the director of the Premier Glass company found a new partner, namely the model Alena, who stood out for her beauty, but not for her intellect. In addition, this was the former partner of Petr Černý, who discouraged his friend Jan from a relationship. Hynek Skála fell in love with Dagmara Lacinová, who joined the Premier Glass company. However, Dagmar was several decades younger than Skála himself. Petr and Anička had a nice relationship until the moment when Petr began to doubt his partner's fidelity. Towards the end of the first series, viewers learned that the heirs were Filip and Anička.

=== Season 2 (2007–2008) ===
At the beginning of the series, the Rubes learn that someone has stolen the entire inheritance. Therefore, a search was started for the property manager Lang, but he was missing. Andrea and Kratochvíl finally moved to a new villa, where her sister Ivana was also supposed to live. Here, however, Kratochvíl's bigamy was revealed. Both Andrea and Ivana broke up with Kratochvíl. In addition, he caused a serious injury that caused the partial non-functionality of his fingers. This meant only one thing for him – he would never be able to operate again. The news devastated him and he turned to alcohol. Anička found out that she was pregnant. However, Petr had doubts if the child was his, so they broke up. In addition, there was a fire in Anna's apartment, which became uninhabitable. Her only salvation was the villa of the Rubeš family, who accepted her as a new family member. Dr. Ludvík Strnad took care of Anička. He had a high-ranking father – he was the deputy director of the hospital, who was Helena Lacinová (Dagmar's sister). In addition, he had serious acquaintances in the ministry. Helena lived with the investigator Pavel Vaňek, who was investigating the disappearance of Simona Rubešová. Černý started an affair with Andrea and also continued to work for Rubeš. He tried to find the property and the administrator of Lang. Aunt Kateřina's secretary, Oskar Prokeš, arrived. The latter was trying to get documents that would confirm that he was a baron. It also emerged that Prokeš worked closely with Simona Rubešová on the plot against the Rubeš family. A new doctor, Hartl, who had a sick wife, joined the hospital. Hartl had a history of alcohol problems, but his wife's condition prevented him from abstaining. Bořek Wágner started dating Marcela Rubešová. A secret relationship began between Dagmar and Jan. Jan had to decide between her and Alena. Jiřina and František had a special relationship. They hardly communicated with each other. Rubeš could not forgive his wife for the affair she had in the past with his brother Jiří. During the first series, it was discovered that Filip's son is not František Rubeš, but his brother Jiří. In addition, the Rubes got into financial problems due to an unresolved inheritance. Administrator Lang spoke to Andree. However, he was the victim of a car accident in Vienna. He was transferred to Prague, but could not communicate with others at all. Andrea also knew about Simona, they met at the abandoned factory hall. The police were also here, investigator Vaňko was accidentally shot and he died. Simona was taken to the remand prison, where she awaited the verdict. Sylva Pecková also appeared, over time the audience learned that she was the sister of Simona Rubešová. They both had a common father, and they were very similar. This was used by Oskar Prokeš, who tried to get Simona out of prison. He planned to exchange Simona and Sylvia in the cell... At the end of the series, Sylva asked Kristián to pay bail for Simona, who lived with Bořek after her release. On the same day, the wedding of Stáňa and Olin took place in Moravia.

== Rating ==
Velmi křehké vztahy wasamong the most watched programs on TV Prima. However, viewership was lower than the first series of Rodinné vztahy, which reached two million viewers. 1,000,000–1,400,000 viewers tuned in regularly every week. The market share was 23–33%. The competitor was the TV series Ordinace v růžové zahradě 2

Season 1 – from January 2007 to August 2007 – Tuesday and Thursday from 20:00 – 1.265.400 – 28.4%

Season 2 – from September 2007 to 2008 – Tuesday and Thursday from 20:00 – 1.135.200 – 26.7%

== Awards ==
=== TýTý ===
- 2005 – 3rd place – Discovery of the Year – Zdeňka Žádníková-Volencová
- 2007 – 3rd place – Series – Velmi křehké vztahy
- 2007 – 2nd place – Actress – Dana Morávková
- 2008 – 2nd place – Series – Velmi křehké vztahy
- 2008 – 2nd place – Actress – Dana Morávková

=== Elsa Awards ===
- 2007 – Nomination– Series – Velmi křehké vztahy
