= Mr. and Mrs. Stodola =

2024 film directed by Petr Hátle

- Directed by: Petr Hátle
- Starring: Jan Hájek; Lucie Žáčková
- Cinematography: Prokop Souček
- Music by: Adam Levý
- Distributed by: CinemArt
- Release date: 29 February 2024
- Running time: 107 minutes
- Countries: Czech Republic; Slovakia
- Language: Czech
- Budget: 14,175,600 CZK

Mr. and Mrs. Stodola (Czech: Manželé Stodolovi) is a crime drama film directed by Petr Hátle about Czech-Slovak serial killer married couple Jaroslav and Dana Stodolovi who are responsible for death of 8 people.

== Plot ==
Jaroslav Stodola and Dana Stodolová are a young couple living in a peaceful village where all the residents know each other well. With a vision of easily obtained money, they decide to rob their lonely old neighbor but Jaroslav kills him in the process. To their surprise, the police almost automatically accept the pensioner's violent death as an accident and take no further interest in the case. They realize that elderly are easy victims not only for petty theft, but also for murder. Dana quickly grows fond of the power over victims and the strange adventurous feeling of winning over the police but Jaroslav finds himself at a crossroads where he has a chance to leave Dana, but fails and must face the consequences of their crimes. Brutal murders were closely related to their relationship, a picture of dependence and mutual manipulation, from which neither could emerge victorious.

== Cast ==
- Jan Hájek as Jaroslav Stodola
- Lucie Žáčková as Dana Stodolová
- Jelena Juklová
- Petr Motloch
- Dana Syslová
- Barbara Lukešová
- Martina Jindrová
