= Alice Bendová =

Czech actress and model (born 1973)

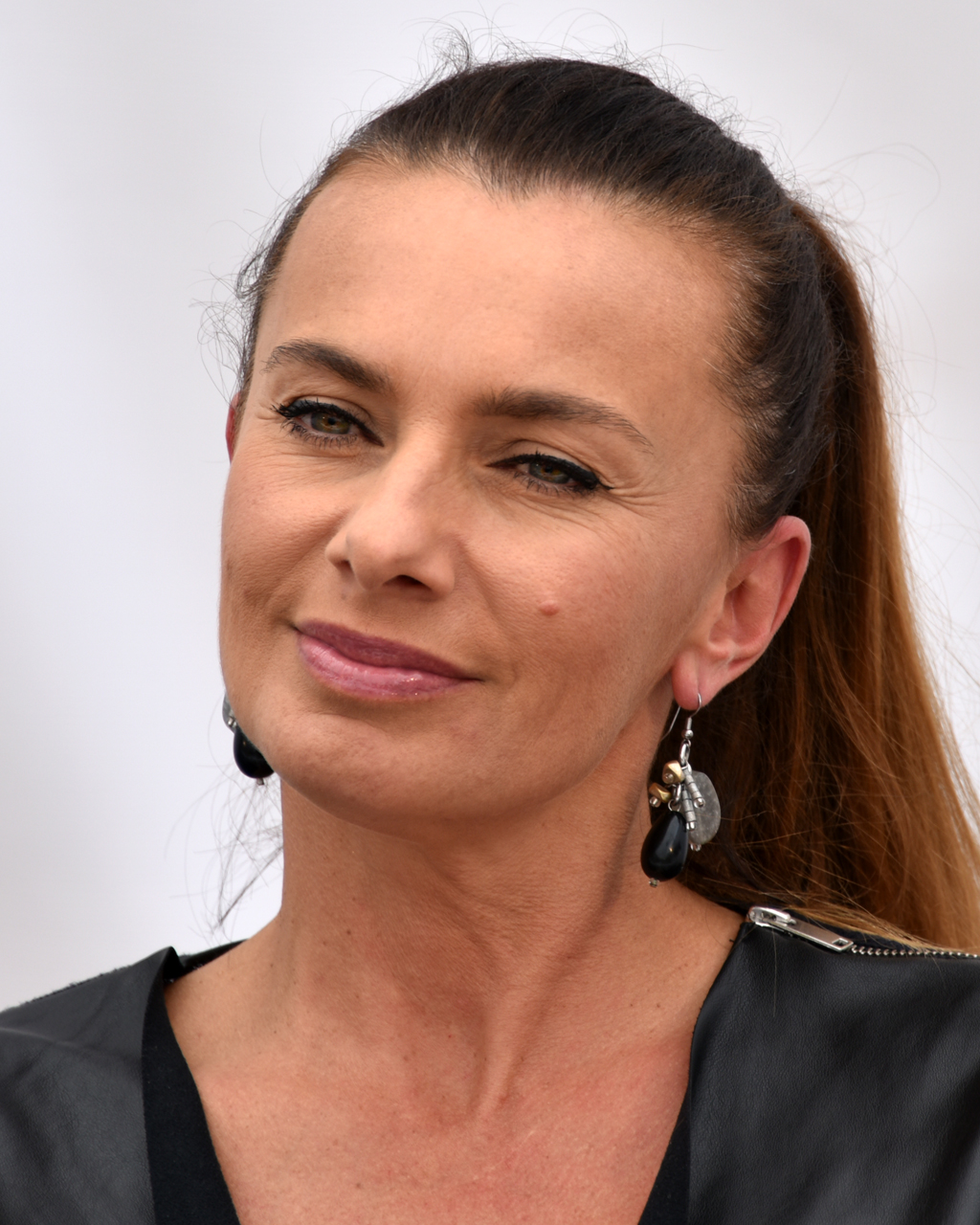
- Bendová in 2019
- Born: Alice Veselá; 1 November 1973 (age 53); Prague, Czechoslovakia
- Occupation: Actress
- Years active: 1997–present
- Partner: Michal Topol
- Children: Václav (son, born in 2007); Alice (daughter, born in 2010)

Alice Bendová (née Veselá; born 1 November 1973) is a Czech actress and model.

== Childhood and education ==
Bendová grew up in Prague and, from the age of eleven, lived independently with her sister in an apartment. Her mother operated a grocery store located 18 kilometers from the city and visited her daughters only on weekends. Bendová studied at Vyšší odborná škola uměleckoprůmyslová a Střední uměleckoprůmyslová škola in Prague, where she focused on furniture design.

== Selected filmography ==
=== Films ===
- Báječná léta pod psa (1997)
- John Sinclair (German series, 1998)
- Studená válka (Germany, 1998)
- Love Lies Bleeding (USA, 1999)
- A Knight's Tale (USA, 2001)
- Duše jako kaviár (2004)
- Sametoví vrazi (2005)
- Rána z milosti (2005) (TV)
- Všechno nejlepší! (2006)
- Kajínek (2010)
- Dešťová víla (2010)
- Kandidát (2013)
- Kameňák 4 (2013)
- Vánoční Kameňák (2015)

=== TV series ===
- The Immortal (Canada, 1998)
- Rodinná pouta (since 2004)
- Hop nebo trop (2004)
- Bazén (2005)
- Letiště (2006)
- Velmi křehké vztahy (2007–2009)
- Profesionálové (2009)
- Základka (2012)
- Svatby v Benátkách (2014–2015)
- Bezdružice (2015)
- Polda (since 2016)

== Personal life ==
Bendová was born in Prague. She had been married to Václav Benda (a former ice hockey player) for many years before she began dating Michal Topol. She has a son and a daughter.

== Controversy ==
In March 2021, Slovak TV presenter Zuzana Belohorcová informed her instagram profile that she was moving her entire family from Miami to the Spanish town of Marbella. The reason for leaving was the dirty environment of the city, in which she did not want to raise her children. Bendová commented on the post saying, "Yuck! Black hell on Earth! Long live Biden, right? It's sad we won't be looking there for a long time."

Journalists from CNN Prima News noticed the sharp reaction of Bendová's fans on social media. One of them commented on her text saying: "You are a C-grade racist scumbag." Another fan asked Bendová under her text: "Racist! You didn't even live there, so what are you judging?" Bendová denied the accusations of racism and stood by her words, but eventually deleted her original statement.
