= Jarosław Kamiński (film editor) =

Polish film editor (born 1960)

- Born: 13 November 1960 (age 65); Łódź
- Occupation: Film editor
- Years active: 1999–present

Jarosław Stanisław Kamiński (born 13 November 1960) is a film editor.

== Biography ==
He graduated from the Faculty of Electrical Engineering of the Łódź Polytechnic (1987) and the Faculty of Film and TV School of the Academy of Performing Arts in Prague (1987). He also obtained his doctorate in Prague (1991). He holds a habilitation degree in Fine Arts, specializing in film editing.

In 1992 he was appointed a lecturer at the Directing Department of the National Film School in Łódź; in the years 1996–1999 he was a vice-dean of this faculty. He was elected a member of the Polish Society of Film Editors, the Polish Film Academy, the European Film Academy, and the American Academy of Motion Picture Arts and Sciences (AMPAS).

== Filmography ==
- Torowisko (1999)
- Listy miłosne (2001)
- Gulczas, a jak myślisz... (2001)
- Yyyreek!!! Kosmiczna nominacja (2002)
- Powiedz to, Gabi (2003)
- Żurek (film) (2003)
- Your Name Is Justine (2005)
- Lawstorant (2006)
- Retrieval (2006)
- The Boy on the Galloping Horse (2006)
- Spring 1941 (2008)
- Before Twilight (2008)
- Moja krew (2009)
- Galerianki (2009)
- Flying Pigs (2010)
- Mistyfikacja (2010)
- Ki (film) (2011)
- You Are God (2012)
- Aftermath (2012)
- Dzień kobiet (2012)
- Ida (2013)
- Mur (2014)
- Jack Strong (2014)
- The Lure (2015)
- Hiszpanka (2015)
- Wszystko gra (2016)
- November (2017)
- Hostages (2017)
- Bikini Blue (2017)
- Sztuka kochania. Historia Michaliny Wisłockiej (2017)
- Werewolf (2018 film) (2018)
- Cold War (2018)
- The Field Guide to Evil (2018)
- Pitbull. Ostatni pies (2018)
- Fugue (2018)
- The Other Lamb (2019)
- The Affair (2019)
- Nomieri (2019)
- Kurier (film) (2019)
- Never Gonna Snow Again (2020)
- Quo Vadis, Aida? (2020)
- Psy 3. W imię zasad (2020)
- Zátopek (2021)
- David and the Elves (2021)
- Prime Time (2021)
- Infinite Storm (2022)
- Blanquita (2022)
- Święto ognia (2023)
- Restore Point (2023)
- Woman Of... (2023)
- Lesní vrah (2024)
- Zamach na papieża (2025)
- Glina. Nowy rozdział (2025)
- Nevděčné bytosti (2025)
- Trzy tygodnie na dnie morza (2025)

Source.

== Awards ==
- 2004 Polish Film Award for best editing for the film Żurek
- 2006 – Award for the editing of the film Retrieval at the Polish Film Festival in Gdynia
- 2013 Polish Film Award for best editing for the film You Are God
- 2014 Polish Film Award for best editing for the film Ida
- European Film Award for Best Editor for the film Cold War (2018)
- 2018 – Award at the 43rd Polish Film Festival in Gdynia for the editing of the film Cold War
- “Golden Glan”, an award from the Charlie cinema in Łódź awarded during the 23rd Forum of European Cinema “Cinergia” in Łódź (2018)
- 2020 Polish Film Award nomination for best editing for the film Werewolf
- 2023 Czech Lion Award for best editing for the film Restore Point

Source.
