= Film Adventurer Karel Zeman =

- Directed by: Tomáš Hodan
- Written by: Tomáš Hodan, Ludmila Zemanová, Martin Polák, Ondřej Beránek
- Cinematography: David Cysař
- Release date: 30 July 2015
- Running time: 102 minutes
- Country: Czech Republic
- Language: Czech

Film Adventurer Karel Zeman (Czech: Filmový dobrodruh Karel Zeman) is a 2015 Czech documentary film about Karel Zeman. It focuses on Zeman's life and work, documenting the creation of his films. The film also features reconstruction of famous scenes of Zeman's films made by animation students. Terry Gilliam and Tim Burton are featured in the film.
