= The Snake Brothers =

- Directed by: Jan Prušinovský
- Screenplay by: Jaroslav Žváček
- Produced by: Ondřej Zima, Jan Prušinovský
- Starring: Kryštof Hádek, Matěj Hádek
- Music by: Matěj Matuška, Michal Čech
- Distributed by: Falcon
- Release date: 19 February 2015
- Running time: 111 minutes
- Country: Czech Republic
- Language: Czech
- Budget: 20 million Kč
- Box office: $384,725

The Snake Brothers (Czech: Kobry a užovky, literally Cobras and Grass Snakes) is a 2015 Czech crime drama film directed by Jan Prušinovský. The film is set in a small Czech town Kralupy nad Vltavou in central Bohemia, Czech Republic.

== Cast ==
- Matěj Hádek as Vojtěch "Grass Snake" Šťastný
- Kryštof Hádek as Petr "Cobra" Šťastný
- Jan Hájek as Tomáš
- Lucie Žáčková as Zůza
- David Máj as Ládík
- Věra Kubánková as Grandma
- Jana Šulcová - as Mother
- Lucie Polišenská as Kača

== Reception ==
The film has received generally positive reviews. It holds 74% at Kinobox, a Czech film review aggregator.

== Awards ==
The Screenplay was awarded by Film foundation in 2011.

The film won Best Actor Award at 2015 Karlovy Vary International Film Festival for Kryštof Hádek. Kryštof noted that the award belongs to his brother Matěj too.

In March 2016 the film won the Czech Lion prize for best film. It also won in the categories of Best Director (Jan Prušinovský), Best Cinematography (Petr Koblovský), Best Actor (Matěj Hádek) and Best Actor and Actress in supporting roles (Kryštof Hádek and Lucie Žáčková). It also won two non-statutory prizes for Best Poster Award and the Prize of film fans. It did not win another 6 nominations (best screenplay, editing, sound, set design, costumes and masks).
