= Czech Lion Award for Best Makeup and Hairstyling =

Czech film award

- Country: Czech Republic
- First award: 1993
- Currently held by: Gabriela Poláková
- Website: https://www.filmovaakademie.cz

Czech Lion Award for Best Makeup and Hairstyling is award given to the Czech film with best Makeup and Hairstyling.

== Winners ==
| Year | English Name | Original Name | Person |
|---|---|---|---|
| 2013 | Burning Bush | Hořící keř | Zdeněk Klika |
| 2014 | Three Brothers | Tři bratři | Zdeněk Klika |
| 2015 | The Seven Ravens | Sedmero krkavců | Juraj Steiner |
| 2016 | A Prominent Patient | Masaryk | Lukáš Král |
| 2017 | Milada | Milada | Andrea McDonald |
| 2018 | The Magic Quill | Kouzelné pírko | Zdeněk Klika |
| 2019 | The Painted Bird | Nabarvené ptáče | Ivo Stagmüller |
| 2020 | Havel | Havel | Adriana Bartošová, René Stejskal |
| 2021 | Zátopek | Zátopek | Jana Dopitová |
| 2022 | Il Boemo | Il Boemo | Andrea McDonald |
| 2023 | Volga | Volha | Martin Valeš, Jana Bílková, Martin Větrovec |
| 2024 | Smetana | Smetana | Martin Valeš, Jana Bílková, Martin Větrovec |
| 2025 | Franz | Franz | Gabriela Poláková |
