= Lost in Munich =

- Theatrical release poster
- Directed by: Petr Zelenka
- Written by: Petr Zelenka
- Produced by: David Ondříček
- Cinematography: Alexander Šurkala
- Edited by: Vladimír Barák
- Music by: Matouš Hejl
- Release dates: 8 October 2015 (BFI London Film Festival); 22 October 2015
- Running time: 120 minutes
- Country: Czech Republic
- Language: Czech
- Budget: 37,000,000 CZK
- Box office: $115,922

Lost in Munich (Czech: Ztraceni v Mnichově) is a 2015 Czech comedy film directed by Petr Zelenka. The movie plot and title are inspired by Lost in La Mancha, a documentary film about Terry Gilliam's unfinished movie.

The narrative revolves a haunted making of the movie Lost in Munich which tells the story about unsuccessful journalist and 90-year-old parrot who used to live with the French prime minister Édouard Daladier and is still repeating Daladier's quotes related to the Munich Agreement. The failed film production (with the feigned French co-production) is the allegory to the alleged French betrayal in 1938.

The film received the Czech Film Critics' Awards for Best Film, Director and Screenplay. It was selected as the Czech entry for the Best Foreign Language Film at the 89th Academy Awards but it was not nominated.

== Cast ==
- Martin Myšička as journalist Pavel Liehm, as himself
- Marek Taclík as journalist Jakub, as himself
- Jana Plodková as secretary of the French Institute, as herself
- Václav Kopta as editor in chief
- Václav Neužil as husband of actress Plodková
- Tomáš Bambušek as film director Tomáš
- Vladimír Škultéty as producent Vladimír
- Jiří Rendl as the assistant director Adam
- Jitka Schneiderová as Pavel's wife Dana, as herself
- Stanislas Pierret as director of French Institute, as actor Gérard Pierret
- Marcial Di Fonzo Bo as parrot assistant/assistant director Jean Dupont

== Reception ==
Stephen Dalton of The Hollywood Reporter wrote:

Paying explicit homage to Francois Truffaut's classic behind-the-scenes film-set comedy Day for Night, Zelenka's mischievous mix of farce and tragedy is a much smarter animal than it first appears. Behind its zany premise and sometimes bumpy tone, Lost in Munich eventually emerges as a sardonic commentary on the Czech people's simplistic self-image as eternal victims of more powerful European neighbors. ... Lost in Munich is unlikely to take much business from Judd Apatow in the multiplex laughter league, but it is both entertaining and educational, a largely successful experiment in navel-gazing meta-comedy.

== See also ==
- List of submissions to the 89th Academy Awards for Best Foreign Language Film
- List of Czech submissions for the Academy Award for Best Foreign Language Film
