= Zdeňka Žádníková-Volencová =

Czech actress and musician (born 1974)

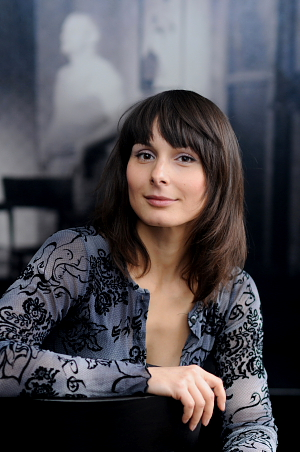
- Žádníková-Volencová in 2011
- Born: 25 October 1974 (age 51); Ústí nad Orlicí, Czechoslovakia
- Occupation: Actress
- Years active: 1995-present

Zdeňka Žádníková-Volencová (born 25 October 1974) is a Czech actress and musician, known particularly for her stage acting at Dejvické divadlo. She was named Discovery of the Year at the 2005 TýTý Awards, for her role as Ivana in the Prima televize television series Rodinná pouta. Žádníková-Volencová can play the western concert flute, recorder, saxophone and piano. She has four children.

== Selected filmography ==
- Anne Frank: The Whole Story (television miniseries, 2001)
- Rodinná pouta (television, 2004–2006)
- Velmi křehké vztahy (television, 2007–2009)
- Little Knights Tale (2009)
