= Unspoken (2023 film) =

- Directed by: Tomáš Mašín
- Starring: Jana Plodková; Marián Mitaš; Milena Steinmasslová; Magdaléna Borová
- Country of origin: Czech Republic
- Original language: Czech

Production
- Running time: 107 minutes

Original release
- Release: 7 September 2023

Unspoken (Czech: Němá tajemství, literally Mute secrets) is a 2023 Czech psychological crime drama television film directed by Tomáš Mašín and starring Jana Plodková. Plot revolves around aphasia, a speech disorder that occurs as a result of a stroke or severe head injury. It was directed by Tomáš Mašín, who wrote the screenplay with Alice Nellis. Production was provided by Donart and Czech Television. The pre-premiere of the film took place in Prague's Lucerna on September 5; the premiere followed two days later.

== Plot ==
Veterinarian Martin loses the ability to communicate with world with him as a result of a serious injury. However, all the important women in his life remain around him: wife Erika, mother Dana and Jana, owner of a horse that caused Martin's injury. All three tell Martin's story, but each comes with its own version of events. On the surface of the apparent family idyll, shells begin to thicken, drawing an ambiguous boundary between good and selfish intentions.

== Cast ==
- Jana Plodková as Erika
- Marián Mitaš as Martin
- Milena Steinmasslová as Dana
- Jiří Havelka
- Magdaléna Borová as Jana
- Igor Chmela as investigator
- Jan Révai as investigator
- Marie Poulová
- Lucie Juřičková
- Filip Zvolenský
