= The Mother-in-Law (2023 film) =

- Theatrical release poster
- Directed by: Jan Vejnar; Tomáš Pavlíček
- Written by: Jan Vejnar; Tomáš Pavlíček
- Produced by: Pavel Vácha, Eva Pavlíčková
- Starring: Jiří Rendl; Simona Peková; Annette Nesvadbová
- Cinematography: Šimon Dvořáček
- Distributed by: Artcam
- Release dates: 5 July 2023 (KVIFF); 9 November 2023 (Czech Republic)
- Running time: 85 minutes
- Country: Czech Republic
- Language: Czech

The Mother-in-Law (Czech: Přišla v noci) is a 2023 Czech comedy horror film written and directed by Jan Vejnar and Tomáš Pavlíček. It premiered at 57th Karlovy Vary International Film Festival. It is set to enter theatres on 9 November 2023.

== Plot ==
30-years old couple Jirka and Aneta live a happy life until Jirka's mother Valerie moves in with them. Life with Jirka's mother who is toxically fixated on him becomes more and more unbearable as she invades their privacy.

== Cast ==
- Simona Peková as Valerie
- Jiří Rendl as Jirka
- Annette Nesvadbová as Aneta
- Denisa Barešová as Natálka
- Judit Bárdos as Friend
- Stanislava Jachnická as Birthday Lady
- Michal Kern as Hobo
- Vladimír Kratina as Kocour
- Jan Vondráček as Patient

== Production ==
It was filmed during 2022. Directors Pavlíček and Vejnary met in January 2022 and decided to make a film together. They came up with idea for the film during February 2022. The first version of the screenplay was finished in June 2022 and final during October 2022 after which the shooting started. The film was filmed primarily in Vejnar's apartment which serves as the main setting of the story. Filmmakers decided to cast mostly unknown actors. Shooting concluded in January 2023.
