= Waltzing Matilda (2023 film) =

2023 Czech tragicomedy film

- Film poster
- Tancuj Matyldo
- Directed by: Petr Slavík
- Written by: Petr Slavík; Nataša Slavíková
- Produced by: Nataša Slavíková
- Starring: Karel Roden; Regina Rázlová; Zuzana Kanócz
- Cinematography: Martin Štrba; Adam Dvořák; David Rauch
- Edited by: Vladimír Bezděk jr.
- Music by: Michal Pavlíček
- Distributed by: Bontonfilm
- Release date: 30 November 2023
- Running time: 113 minutes
- Country: Czech Republic
- Language: Czech
- Budget: 26,100,000 CZK
- Box office: 12,088,093 CZK

Waltzing Matilda (Czech: Tancuj Matyldo) is a Czech tragicomedy film directed by Petr Slavík, released in 2023.

== Cast ==
- Karel Roden as bailiff Karel Jaroš, son of Matylda
- Regina Rázlová as Matylda Jarošová, former singer
- Antonio Šoposki as Pavel Jaroš, grandson of Matylda
- Zuzana Kanócz as lawyer Lucie, Karel's girlfriend
- Simona Postlerová as debtor Sobotková
- Stanislav Lehký as Falout's neighbor
- Eva Leinweberová Nosálková as social worker Vlková
- Miroslav Babuský as customer
- Michal Gulyáš as debtor Luboš Falout
- Natálie Hejlová as Jana, Pavel's girl
- Petra Horváthová as policewoman
- Jiří Rendl as policeman
