= Czech Lion Award for Best Costume Design =

Czech film award

- Country: Czech Republic
- First award: 1993
- Currently held by: Michaela Horáčková Hořejší
- Website: https://www.filmovaakademie.cz

Czech Lion Award for Best Costume Design is award given to the Czech film with best Costume Design.

== Winners ==
Year	English Name	Original Name	Costume Designer
2001	Rebelové	Rebelové	Kateřina Mírová
2002	Andělská tvář	Andělská tvář	Josef Jelínek
2003–2012	not announced		
2013	Burning Bush	Hořící keř	Katarína Hollá
2014	Three Brothers	Tři bratři	Simona Rybáková
2015	The Seven Ravens	Sedmero krkavců	Kateřina Štefková
2016	A Prominent Patient	Masaryk	Katarína Štrbová Bieliková
2017	Milada	Milada	Simona Rybáková
2018	The Hastrman	Hastrman	Eva Kotková
2019	The Painted Bird	Nabarvené ptáče	Helena Rovná
2020	Shadow Country	Krajina ve stínu	Zuzana Bambušek Krejzková
2021	Božena	Božena	Katarína Štrbová Bieliková
2022	Il Boemo	Il Boemo	Andrea Cavalletto
2023	Volga	Volha	Vladimíra Pachl Fomínová
2024	Girl America	Amerikánka	Jan Kadlec
2025	Franz	Franz	Michaela Horáčková Hořejší
