= Václav Neužil =

Czech actor

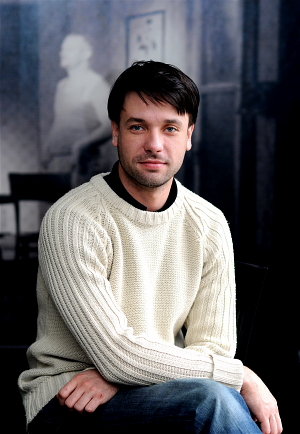
- Born: 4 October 1979 (age 46); Plzeň, Czechoslovakia
- Occupation: Actor
- Years active: 2002–present

Václav Neužil (born 4 October 1979) is a Czech actor.

Neužil was awarded the Czech Lion Award for Best Actor in Leading Role and Czech Film Critics' Award for Best Actor for his role in 2021 film Zátopek.

== Selected filmography ==
=== Film ===
- The Seven Ravens (2015)
- Lost in Munich (2015)
- Anthropoid (2016)
- Ice Mother (2017)
- Patrimony (2018)
- Toman (2018)
- Dukla 61 (2018)
- National Street (2019)
- The Watchmaker's Apprentice (2019)
- Zátopek (2021)
- Brothers (2023)
- Girl America (2024)
- Vyšehrad Dvje (2025)
- Little Thief (2026)
- Changes (2026)

=== Television ===
- The Fourth Star (2014)
- Lajna (2017)
- Svět pod hlavou (2017)
- Dabing Street (2018)
- Zkáza Dejvického divadla (2019)
- Třídní schůzka (2021)
