= Lucie Žáčková =

Czech actress

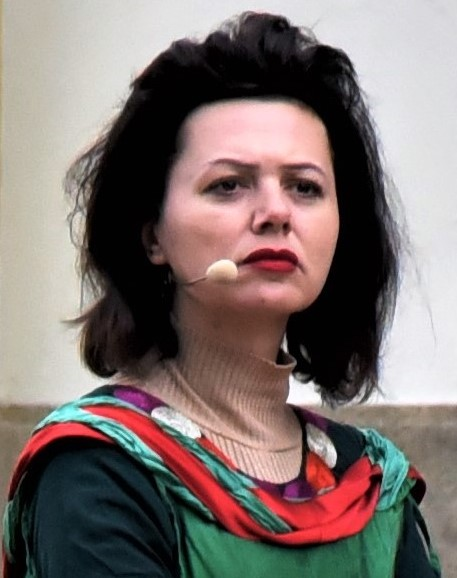
- Žáčková in 2019
- Born: 16 February 1978 (age 48); Ostrava, Czechoslovakia
- Occupation: Actress
- Years active: 2000-present

Lucie Žáčková (born 16 February 1978) is a Czech film and stage actress.

She won the Young Talent award at the 2003 Thalia Awards and 2003 Alfréd Radok Awards. She won the Czech Lion award for Best Supporting Actress in 2015 for her role in the film The Snake Brothers. Žáčková also won the Play category at the 2026 Thalia Awards.

Žáčková is a born-again Christian.

== Selected filmography ==
- The City of the Sun (2005)
- Zoufalci (2009)
- Revival (2013)
- The Snake Brothers (2015)
- Mr. and Mrs. Stodola (2024)
- Broken Voices / Sbormistr, (2025)
