= Zátopek (film) =

- Theatrical release poster
- Directed by: David Ondříček
- Written by: David Ondříček; Alice Nellis; Jan P. Muchow
- Produced by: David Ondříček; Kryštof Mucha
- Starring: Václav Neužil; Martha Issová
- Cinematography: Štěpán Kučera
- Edited by: Jarosław Kamiński
- Music by: Beata Hlavenková
- Production companies: Lucky Man Films; Česká televize Z Films; Barrandov Studios
- Distributed by: Falcon
- Release dates: 20 August 2021 (KVIFF); 26 August 2021 (Czech Republic)
- Running time: 130 minutes
- Countries: Czech Republic; Slovakia; Germany
- Language: Czech
- Budget: 92 million CZK
- Box office: 64 Million CZK

Zátopek is a 2021 biographical drama film about Emil Zátopek co-written, co-produced and directed by David Ondříček, starring Václav Neužil. It was selected as the Czech entry for the Best International Feature Film at the 94th Academy Awards, but it was not nominated

== Plot ==
Ron Clarke competes at the 1968 Summer Olympics but fails to win any medal. Feeling disappointed that he might have lost his last chance to win an Olympics medal he starts to doubt his career and decides to meet Emil Zátopek whom he adores. The film is about their dialogue during which audience can learn retrospectively about Zátopek's sport career and his life.

== Cast ==
- Václav Neužil as Emil Zátopek
- Martha Issová as Dana Zátopková
- Robert Mikluš as Josef Dostál
- James Frecheville as Ron Clarke
- Gabriel Andrews as Ron's Trainer
- Sinead Phelps as Helen
- Sean Brodeur as English Soldier
- Anna Schmidtmajerová as Dana's friend
- Filipp Mogilnitskiy as Soviet journalist
- Roy McCrerey as English Commentator
- Daniela Hirsh as Translator
- Kevin Clarke as Disgruntled Spectator

== Production ==
David Ondříček came up with an idea for the film in 2007 and started to work on the screenplay and started to prepare the film after he finished Dukla 61. In 2015, Ondříček started to gather finances for the film and submitted application for a grant from Czech State Fund for Cinematography but was twice rejected. After the release of Ondříček's film Dukla 61, Ondříček's third request was accepted and Zátopek received subsidy of 15 million CZK allowing Ondříček to renew preparations.

Shooting started on 29 April 2019 at Březnice stadium near Příbram. Scenes shot there with the main actors also included around 150 extras and were considered one of the most cost complicated in the film due to number of people.

Main parts of the film were shot from August 2019. Crew were shooting on various athletic areas such as Riegrovy sady or Za Lužánkami Stadium which served as replacement for London Olympic Stadium and the Helsinki Olympic Stadium. The stadium had to be adjusted for the shooting. Shooting concluded in November 2019.

First trailer for the film was released on 30 December 2019.

== Release ==
The film was originally set to premiere on 13 August 2020, but was delayed for 2021 due to COVID-19 pandemic in the Czech Republic. A new date was set for 12 August 2021. It was eventually moved to 20 August 2021 during the 55th Karlovy Vary International Film Festival. Distribution for cinemas was set for 26 August 2021. On 19 September 2022 the film was released on Voyo streaming service.

== Reception ==
=== Critical reception ===
Zátopek has received generally positive reviews from critic holding 82% on Kinobox.

=== Accolades ===
The film won the audience award at the Karlovy Vary International Film Festival garnering a 1.13 rating from the audience narrowly beating Quo Vadis, Aida?.

Awards and nominations received by Zátopek
Year	Event	Award	Category	Recipient(s)	Result	Ref(s)
2021	55th Karlovy Vary International Film Festival	Crystal Globe	Best film	Zátopek	Nominated	
2021	55th Karlovy Vary International Film Festival	Deník právo Award	Audience award	David Ondříček	Won	

== See also ==
- List of submissions to the 94th Academy Awards for Best International Feature Film
- List of Czech submissions for the Academy Award for Best International Feature Film
