= Marek Taclík =

Czech actor (born 1973)

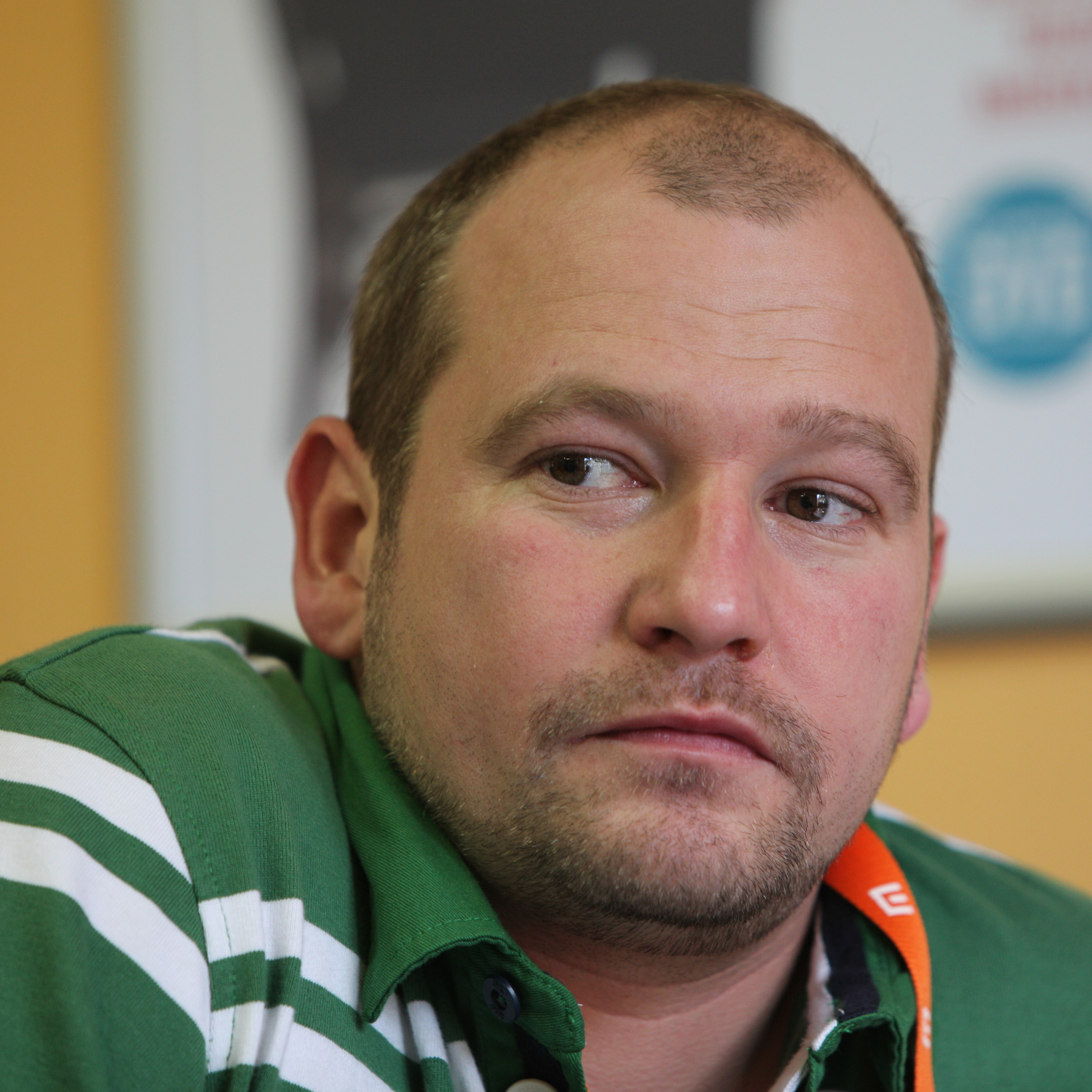
- Marek Taclík at the KVIFF in 2009
- Born: 9 May 1973 (age 51); Ústí nad Labem, Czechoslovakia
- Occupation: Actor
- Years active: 1994–present

Marek Taclík (born 9 May 1973 in Ústí nad Labem) is a Czech actor. He starred in the film Operace Silver A under director Jiří Strach in 2007.

== Selected filmography ==
- One Hand Can't Clap (2003)
- Grandhotel (2006)
- Operace Silver A (2007)
- In the Shadow (2012)
- Lost in Munich (2015)
- Shadow Country (2020)
