= Martin Myšička =

Czech actor (born 1970)

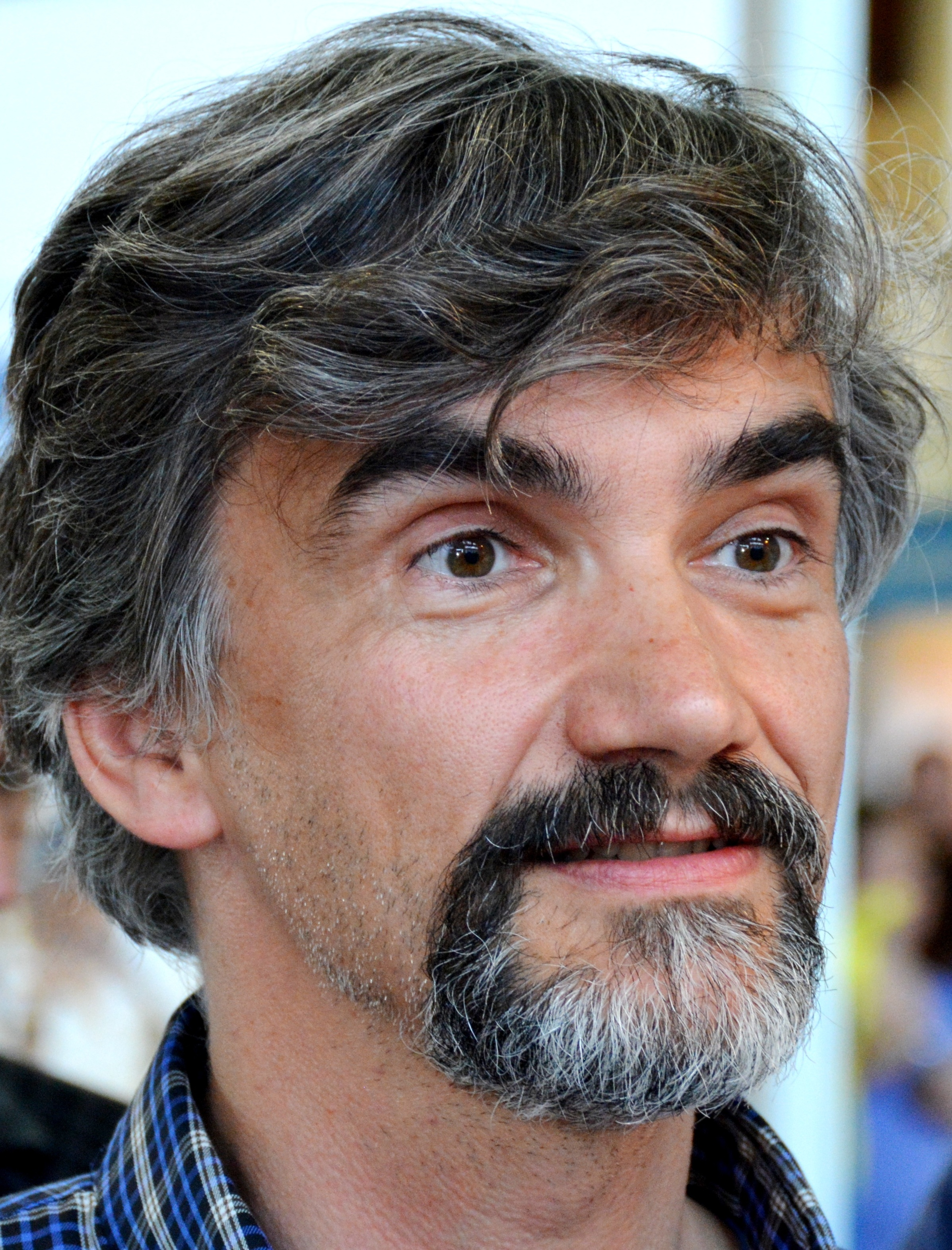
- Myšička in 2015
- Born: 9 March 1970 (age 55); Příbram, Czechoslovakia
- Occupation: Actor
- Years active: 1996–present

Martin Myšička (born 9 March 1970) is a Czech actor. He has appeared in more than twenty films since 1996. He won the 'Talent of the Year' award at the Alfréd Radok Awards while still at university. He has been performing at the Dejvice Theatre for more than 25 years.

== Personal life ==
Martin Myšička was born in a hospital in Příbram, however, he is native of Stará Huť, where he lived until the age of 3. His family then moved to Žatec and when he was 12 years old, his family moved to Stará Boleslav. He is married with two daughters. From 2017, he lives in Roztoky.

== Selected filmography ==
Film
Year	Title	Role	Notes
2008	The Karamazov Brothers		
2009	Protector		
2012	In the Shadow		
2015	Lost in Munich	Pavel	
2019	The Sleepers (Bez vědomí)	Victor	TV series
