= Kryštof Hádek =

Czech actor

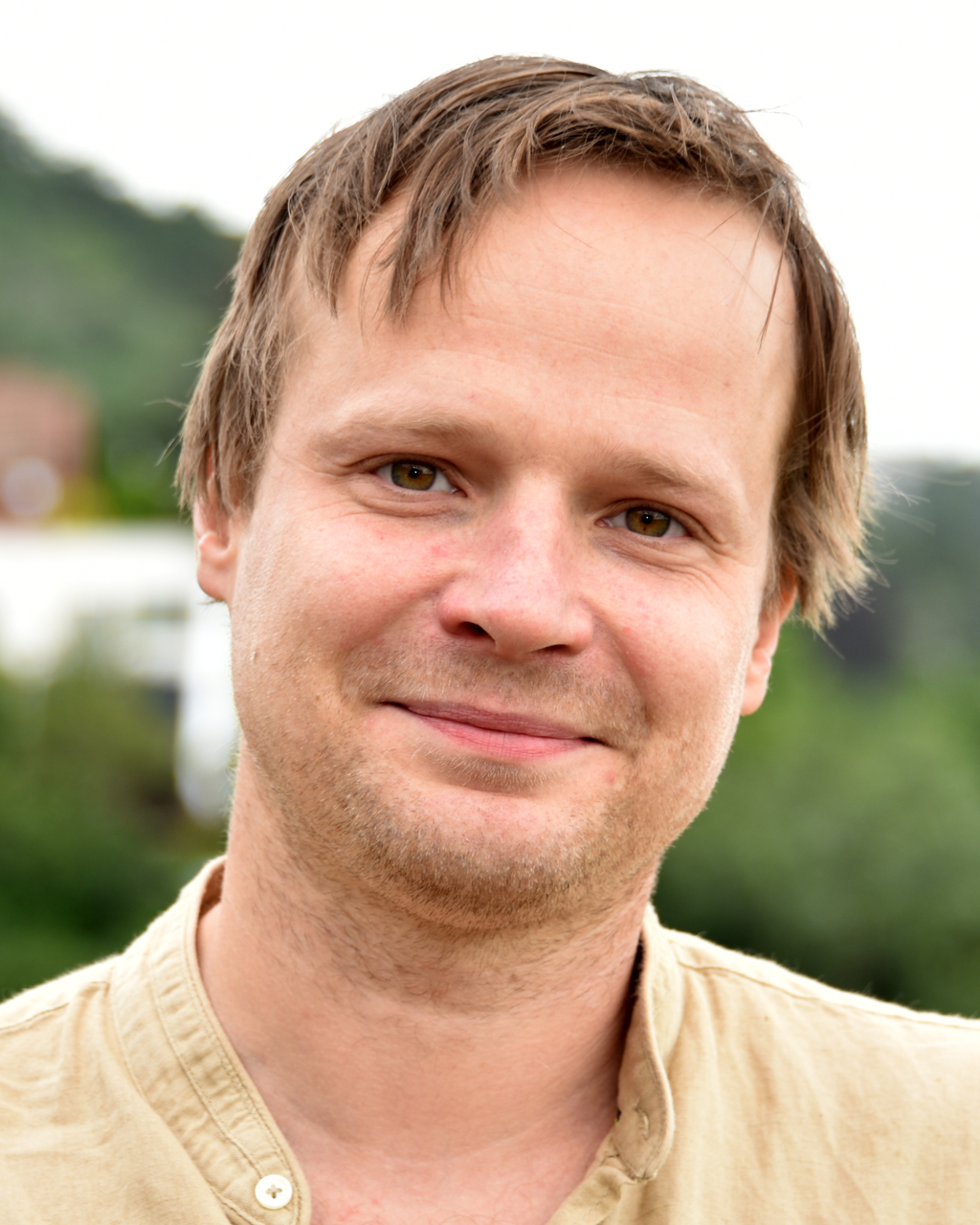
- Born: 10 March 1982 (age 44); Prague, Czechoslovakia (now Czech Republic)
- Occupation: Actor
- Years active: 2000–present
- Relatives: Matěj Hádek (brother)

Kryštof Hádek (born 10 March 1982) is a Czech actor.

He studied at the People's School of Art and at the Prague Conservatory, from which he was expelled in the fourth year for a high amount of absences, which originated when Hádek began to actively pursue acting while still studying. Between 2003 and 2004 he studied a year and a half at the London Academy of Music and Dramatic Art.

Hádek's first major role was in the 2001 film Dark Blue World by Jan Svěrák, 2001, in which he played Sergeant Karel Vojtíšek. For his rendering of the young airman, Hádek was nominated in 2001 for the Czech Lion (the highest film award in the Czech Republic) for the Best Male Actor in a Supporting Role.

Hádek also appeared in several TV movies, including The Life of Teenager (2000), Black Tears (2002) and A Vote for the King of the Romans (2016), as well as series including Ghosts Among Us (2000). Other theatrical films include 2002's Trip (by Alice Nellis) and, in 2006, Experts (directed by Karel Coma), in which he played the leading role of a young man named Oskar.

For his leading role in 3 Seasons in Hell (2009), in which he played a young, bohemian, extravagant Czechoslovak poet, he was once again nominated for the Czech Lion award, and won.

Hádek also appeared in several seasons of RTÉ's Irish restaurant-based drama Raw playing the homosexual character Pavel from Season 1 to Season 4. He also appeared in the film Under the Skin.

His elder brother Matěj is also an actor. They starred together in a film The Snake Brothers for which Kryštof gained the Best Actor Award at 2015 Karlovy Vary International Film Festival.
