= Matěj Hádek =

Czech actor

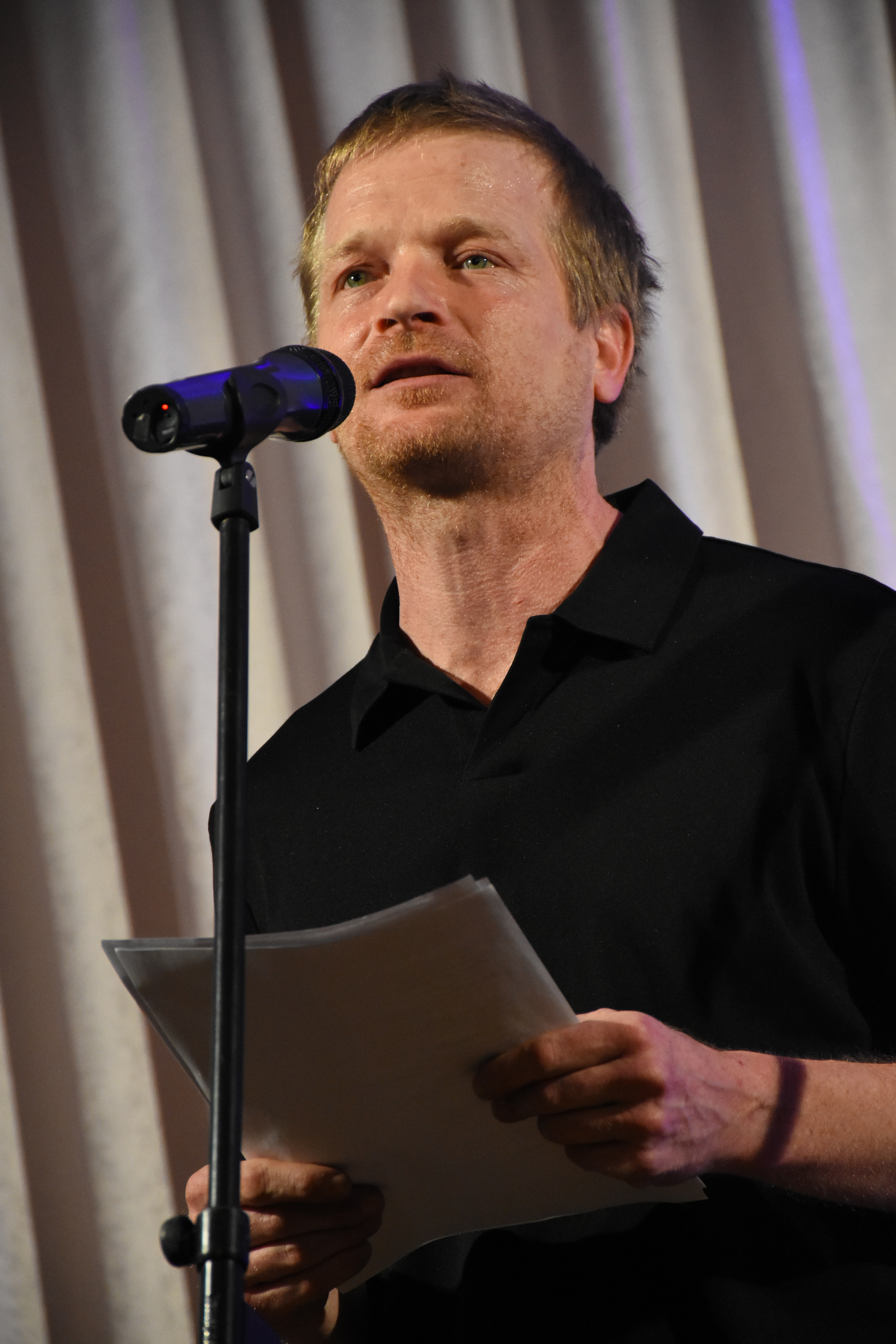
- Matěj Hádek (2017)
- Born: 29 November 1975 (age 50); Prague, Czechoslovakia (now Czech Republic)
- Occupation: Actor
- Years active: 1991–present
- Relatives: Kryštof Hádek (brother)

Matěj Hádek (born 29 November 1975 in Prague) is a Czech actor. He starred in the film Operace Silver A under director Jiří Strach in 2007. His brother Kryštof Hádek is also an actor.
