= Martha Issová =

Czech actress

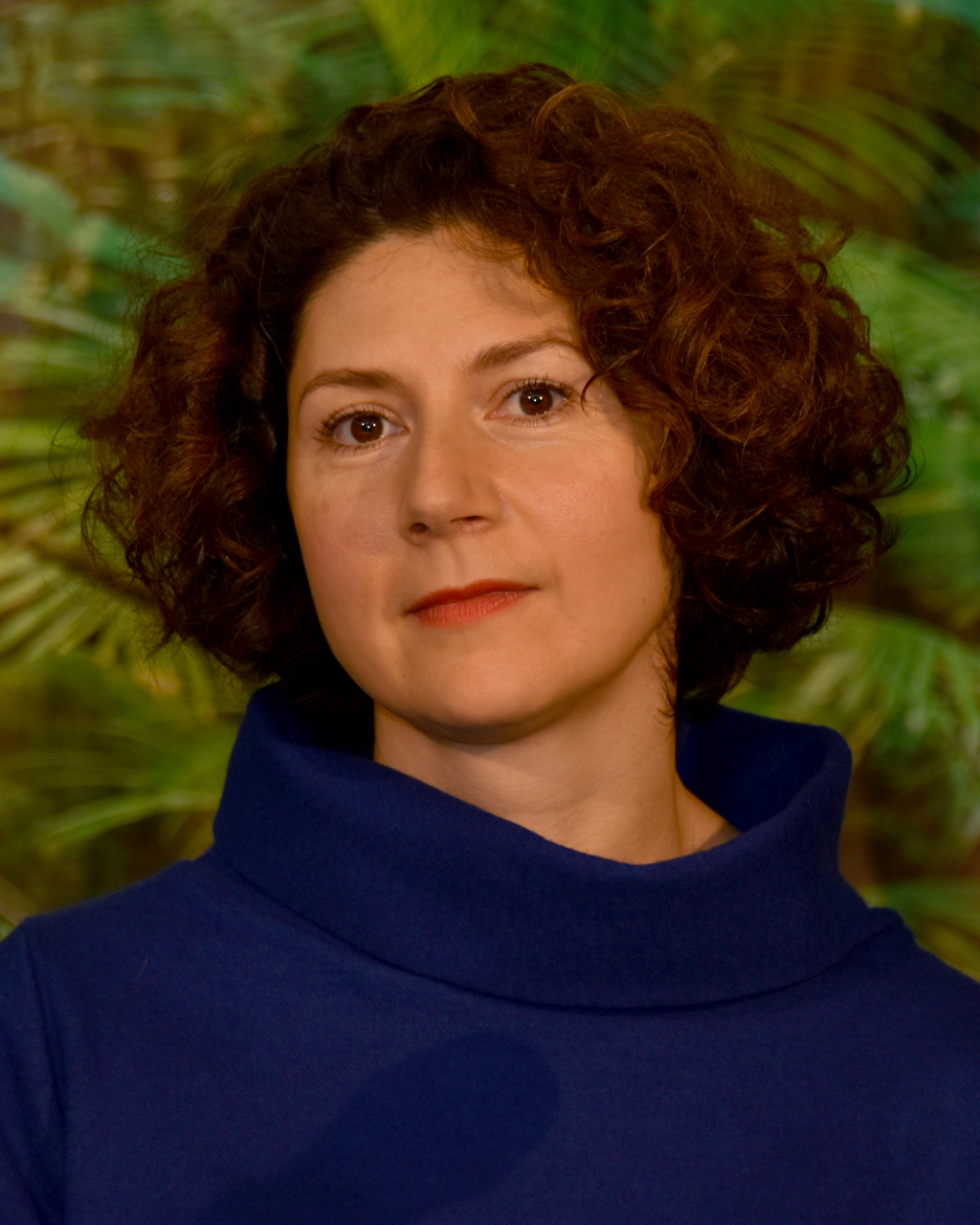
- Martha Issová
- Born: 22 March 1981 (age 45); Prague, Czechoslovakia
- Occupation: Actress
- Years active: 1995–present
- Partner: David Ondříček
- Children: 2

Martha Issová (also known as Martha Issa; born 22 March 1981) is a Czech film, television and stage actress.

== Biography ==
Issová was born in Prague, into a family with Syrian roots. She is the daughter of actress Lenka Termerová and director Moris Issa. Her cousin is Klára Issová. She studied at the State Conservatory in Prague. She started performing at Prague's Divadlo na Fidlovačce and continued performing at other Prague theatres. Since 2006 she has been performing at Prague's Dejvice Theatre.

She has two daughters with her partner David Ondříček.

== Filmography ==
- Changes (2026) .... Kamila
- Buko (2022) .... Tereza
- Zátopek (2021) .... Dana Zátopková
- Resistance (2020) .... Flora
- The Zookeeper's Wife (2017) .... Regina Kenigswein
- The Seven Ravens (2015) .... Bohdanka
- Operace Dunaj (2009) .... Petra
- You Kiss Like a God (2009) .... Běla, Adam's Wife
- O bílé paní .... Fanynka
- "Private Traps" (2008) .... Hanka Mašková (episode Tři do páru ???)
- Night Owls (2008) .... Ofka
- "Trapasy" (2008) TV series .... Mrs. Klímová (episode Kočárek 2008)
- Little Girl Blue (2007) .... Cecilie
- Stop (2007) (TV) .... Jana
- "Náves" (2006) TV series .... Moka Vaněčková (episodes Last Love and Comedians, 2006)
- "Dobrá čtvrť" (2005) TV series .... Katka Erhartová
- "Hop nebo trop" (2005) TV series .... Bohuna
- Koumáci (2004)
- Děvčátko (2002) .... Věra
- Waterloo po česku (2002)
- Tuláci (2002) (TV)
- Otec neznámý (2001) (TV) .... Maruška Outlá
- Nelásky (2001)
- Začátek světa (2000) .... Marta
- Debut (2000) .... Jitka
- The Conception of My Younger Brother (2000)
- Hanele (1999)
- Otevřené srdce (1999) .... Lisa
- "Když se slunci nedaří" (1995) TV series

== Theatre ==
=== Divadlo Na Fidlovačce ===
- Loupežník .... Mimi
- Horoskop pro Rudolfa II .... Trudi
- Podivná paní S .... Fairy May
- Když tančila .... Belzer
- Help .... Aranka
- Růžové šampaňské .... Mary
- Nahniličko .... Seňorita

=== Dejvice Theatre ===
- The Magic Flute (2005) .... Pamina
- KFT/Sandwich Reality® (2005) .... Ann
- Karamazovi (2006) .... Kateřina
- Spříznění volbou (2006) .... Otýlie
- The Black Hole (2007) .... Brenda
- Oblomov (2008) .... Olga Sergeievna Iljinskaya
- Idiot (2008) .... Aglaia
- Debris (2009) .... Michelle

== Other Stage Works ==
- Nahniličko .... Seňorita (Kalich Theatre)
