= 2025 Czech Lion Awards =

Czech film and TV award ceremony

33rd Czech Lion Awards
- Date: 14 March 2026
- Hosted by: Bianca Cristovao
- Directed by: Michael Čech

Highlights
- Best Picture: Caravan
- Best Actor: Idan Weiss; Franz
- Best Actress: Kateřina Falbrová; Broken Voices
- Best Supporting Actor: Dũng Nguyễn; Summer School, 2001
- Best Supporting Actress: Juliána Brutovská; Caravan
- Most awards: Franz (4)
- Most nominations: Franz (15)

Television coverage
- Network: Czech Television
- Ratings: 623,000

The 2025 Czech Lion Awards ceremony was held on 14 March 2026.

== Categories ==
Nominations were announced on 19 January 2026. Franz received highest number of nominations, being followed by Broken Voices and Caravan. Crime comedy Do the Mæth has won the Film Fans Award while Franz has won a non-statutory award for the Best poster. Caravan has won the Best film award while Franz received most awards. Dũng Nguyễn has won Best supporting actor award, becoming the first Vietnamese to win Czech Lion. Projects by TV Nova dominated television categories with Studna and Král Šumavy 2.

Best Film	Best Director
Caravan; Franz; Summer School, 2001; Promise, I'll Be Fine; Broken Voices	Katarína Gramatová – Promise, I'll Be Fine; Agnieszka Holland – Franz; Zuzana Kirchnerová – Caravan; Dužan Duong – Summer School, 2001; Ondřej Provazník – Broken Voices
Best Actor in a Leading Role	Best Actress in a Leading Role
Idan Weiss – Franz; David Vodstrčil – Caravan; Michal Záchenský – Promise, I'll Be Fine; Hynek Čermák – Invincibles; Juraj Loj – Broken Voices	Kateřina Falbrová – Broken Voices; Aňa Geislerová – Caravan; Quỳnh Lan Lê – Summer School, 2001; Elizaveta Maximová – Mom; Lucie Fingerhutová – The Other Side of Summer
Best Actor in a Supporting Role	Best Actress in a Supporting Role
Dũng Nguyễn – Summer School, 2001; Peter Kurth – Franz; Josef Trojan – Franz; Ivan Trojan – Franz; Ivan Trojan – Invincibles	Juliána Brutovská – Caravan; Jenovéfa Boková – Franz; Jana Plodková – Caravan; Sophia Šporclová – Mom; Maya Kintera – Broken Voices
Best Screenplay	Best Cinematography
Dužan Duong, Lukáš Kokeš, Jan Smutný – Summer School, 2001; Marek Epstein, Agnieszka Holland – Franz; Zuzana Kirchnerová, Tomáš Bojar, Kristina Májová – Caravan; Katarína Gramatová – Promise, I'll Be Fine; Ondřej Provazník – Broken Voices	Dušan Husár, Miro Remo – Better Go Mad in the Wild; Tomasz Naumiuk – Franz; Simona Weisslechner, Denisa Buranová – Caravan; Tomáš Kotas – Promise, I'll Be Fine; Lukáš Milota – Broken Voices
Music	Best Editing
Jonatan Pjoni Pastirčák, Aid Kid – Broken Voices; Jan P. Muchow – Fichtelberg; Maria Komasa-Łazarkiewicz, Antoni Komasa-Łazarkiewicz – Franz; Aid Kid, Viera Marinová – Caravan; 700 Feel – Promise, I'll Be Fine	Better Go Mad in the Wild – Máté Csuport, Šimon Hájek; Franz – Pavel Hrdlička; Caravan – Adam Brothánek; Summer School, 2001 – Jakub Jelínek, Jakub Podmanický; Broken Voices – Anna Johnson Ryndová
Sound	Stage Design
Broken Voices – Juraj Mravec, Petr Čechák; Franz – Marek Hart, Michaela Patríková, Tomáš Bělohradský; Caravan – Martin Ženíšek, Michal Deliopulos, Klára Javoříková; Promise, I'll Be Fine – Anna Žihlová, Peter Hilčanský, Samuel Perunko; Better Go Mad in the Wild – Lukáš Kasprzyk, Adam Matej	Franz – Henrich Boráros; Sugar Candy – Adam Pitra, Branislav Mihálik; Fichtelberg – Jiří Sternwald, Šimon Koudela; Summer School, 2001 – Marek František Đỏ Špitálský; Broken Voices – Irena Hradecká
Makeup and Hairstyling	Costume Design
Franz – Gabriela Poláková; Fichtelberg – Miroslava Krepsová, Jaroslav Šámal; Mom – Lenka Nosková; Broken Voices – Eva Schwarzová; Studna – Jana Bílková	Franz – Michaela Horáčková Hořejší; Sugar Candy – Sylva Zimula Hanáková; Fichtelberg – Sylva Zimula Hanáková; Summer School, 2001 – Veronika Varcholová; Broken Voices – Marek Cpin
Best Animated Film	Best Short Film
Tales from the Magic Garden; I Died in Irpin; Stone of Destiny; tiny film about rape; Wolfie	Dog and Wolf; Wayfarer; Hey, Czechs!; Cultural Front; First Patrol
Best Television Miniseries or Series	Best Documentary
Studna; Král Šumavy 2; Moloch; Oktopus II; Ratolesti	Better Go Mad in the Wild; What About Petey?; The Impossibility; The Other One; Change My Mind
Best Leading Actor in TV Series	Best Leading Actress in TV Series
David Švehlík – Studna; Oskar Hes – Král Šumavy 2; Miroslav Krobot – Oktopus II	Johana Matoušková – Studna; Judit Pecháček – Děcko; Anna Geislerová – Ratolesti
Best Supporting Actor in TV Series	Best Supporting Actress in TV Series
Jan Nedbal – Král Šumavy 2; Miroslav Donutil – Moloch; Filip František Červenka – Studna	Kristýna Ryška – Král Šumavy 2; Elizaveta Maximová – Děcko; Tatiana Dyková – Limity
Unique Contribution to Czech Film	Extraordinary audiovisual achievement
Helena Bezděk Franková	not awarded

=== Non-statutory Awards ===
Best Film Poster	Film Fans Award
Franz – Michal Čermín; Caravan– Erika Partilová, Lara Rajnišová; Summer School, 2001 – Jiří Mocek, Robin Skotnicki; Do the Mæth – Jaroslav Mašek; Better Go Mad in the Wild – Rasťo Tupý	Do the Mæth
Magnesie Award for Best Student Film
Dog and Wolf; tiny film about rape; Píchlé duše; The Tower; Wolfie

=== Films and series with multiple nominations and awards ===
Titles with multiple nominations
Nominations	Film or Series
15	Franz
13	Broken Voices
11	Caravan
8	Summer School, 2001
7	Promise, I'll Be Fine
5	Studna
4	Better Go Mad in the Wild
4	Fichtelberg
4	Král Šumavy 2
3	Mom
2	Děcko
2	Moloch
2	Oktopus II
2	Ratolesti

Titles with multiple wins
Awards	Film or Series
4	Franz
3	Studna
3	Better Go Mad in the Wild
3	Broken Voices
2	Caravan
2	Král Šumavy 2
2	Summer School, 2001
