= 1997 Czech Lion Awards =

Czech film award ceremony

5th Czech Lion Awards
- Date: February 28, 1997
- Site: Lucerna, Prague
- Hosted by: Bolek Polívka

Highlights
- Best Picture: Buttoners
- Best Actor: Jiří Schmitzer; Boomerang
- Best Actress: Lenka Vlasáková; Lea
- Best Supporting Actor: Jiří Kodet; Buttoners
- Best Supporting Actress: Martha Issová; An Ambiguous Report About the End of the World
- Most awards: An Ambiguous Report About the End of the World (4); Buttoners (4)
- Most nominations: Lea (9)

Television coverage
- Network: Czech Television

1997 Czech Lion Awards ceremony was held on 28 February 1998. Buttoners has won four awards.

== Winners and nominees ==
Best Film	Best Director
Buttoners	Petr Zelenka — Buttoners
Best Actor in a Leading Role	Best Actress in a Leading Role
Jiří Schmitzer — Boomerang	Lenka Vlasáková — Lea
Best Actor in a Supporting Role	Best Actress in a Supporting Role
Jiří Kodet — Buttoners	Martha Issová — An Ambiguous Report About the End of the World
Best Screenplay	Best Editing
Buttoners	An Ambiguous Report About the End of the World
Design	Best Cinematography
The Path through a Desolate Forest	Lea
Music	Sound
An Ambiguous Report About the End of the World	An Ambiguous Report About the End of the World
Unique Contribution to Czech Film
Miloš Forman

=== Non-statutory Awards ===
Best Foreign Film	Most Popular Film
Breaking the Waves	Men in Black
Film Critics' Award	Cinema Readers' Award
Buttoners	Those Wonderful Years That Sucked
