= Franz (2025 film) =

Biographical drama film by Agnieszka Holland

- Czech theatrical release poster
- Directed by: Agnieszka Holland
- Written by: Marek Epstein
- Story by: Marek Epstein; Mike Downey
- Produced by: Šárka Cimbalová; Agnieszka Holland
- Starring: Idan Weiss; Jenovéfa Boková; Carol Schuler; Sebastian Schwarz; Katarina Stark; Aaron Friesz
- Cinematography: Tomasz Naumiuk
- Edited by: Pavel Hrdlicka
- Music by: Mary Komasa, Antoni Łazarkiewicz
- Production companies: Marlene Film Production; Metro Films; X Filme Creative Pool
- Distributed by: Bioscop (Czech Republic); Kino Świat (Poland); X Verleih (Germany)
- Release date: 5 September 2025 (TIFF)
- Countries: Czech Republic; Poland; Germany; France; Turkey
- Languages: Czech; German

Franz is a 2025 biographical drama film directed by Agnieszka Holland and written by Marek Epstein. Starring Idan Weiss as Franz Kafka, it follows the author's life from his early teens in his hometown of Prague to his premature death in 1924.

The film had its world premiere at the 2025 Toronto International Film Festival on 5 September. It was selected as Poland's submission for Best International Feature Film at the 98th Academy Awards, but it was not nominated. The film received generally positive reviews from critics.

== Plot ==
Prague at the beginning of the 20th century: Franz Kafka (Idan Weiss) is torn between the strict expectations of his father Hermann (Peter Kurth), his monotonous daily routine at an insurance company, and his deep-rooted urge to write and thus give literary expression to his innermost feelings. His texts finally receive initial attention, while he continues to try to lead a life between conforming to others, such as his dominant father, and self-realisation. Viewers should be warned that the torture depicted in the visual rendering of Kafka’s short story “In the penal colony” could leave them traumatised. Time and again, Franz experiences intense relationships with women who enchant him to the utmost, inevitably facing the tensions between closeness and withdrawal. Supported by his friend and publisher Max Brod (Sebastian Schwarz), the picture emerges of a man searching for his place in the world – between a sense of duty, inner turmoil and creative expression.

== Cast ==
- Idan Weiss as Franz Kafka
  - Daniel Dongres as Young Franz
- Peter Kurth as Hermann Kafka
- Jenovéfa Boková as Milena Jesenská
- Ivan Trojan as Siegfried Löwy, Kafka's uncle
- Sandra Korzeniak as Julie Kafka
- Carol Schuler as Felice Bauer
- Sebastian Schwarz as Max Brod
- Katarina Stark as Ottla Kafka
- Anna Císařovská as Valli Kafka
- Josef Trojan as Yitzchak Lowy
- Aaron Friesz as Oskar Baum
- Jan Budař as officer
- Stanislav Majer as Adolf Just, sanatorium director
- Emma Smetana as tour guide
- Karel Dobrý as Pfohl
- Gesa Schermuly as Grete Bloch

== Production ==
The Franz screenplay was written by Holland and Marek Epstein based on a story by Epstein and Mike Downey. Principal photography began on 12 April 2024, in Prague and moved to Berlin at the end of May.

== Release ==
Franz competed for the Golden Shell in the official selection of the 73rd San Sebastián International Film Festival.

== Reception ==
On the review aggregator website Rotten Tomatoes, 74% of 62 critics' reviews are positive, with an average rating of 7.2/10. The website's consensus reads: "Capably carried by Idan Weiss and punctuated with subtle surrealism, Franz can't solve the mystery of Kafka but does a commendable job of recreating his artistic perspective." Metacritic, which uses a weighted average, assigned the film a score of 64 out of 100, based on 9 critics, indicating "generally favorable reviews".

In a review for Deadline, critic Damon Wise calls the film a "playful and oddly endearing biopic of the enigmatic Czech author."

Jared Marcel Pollen writes that the film tries "to present an unassuming, de-mythologized portrait of Kafka...."

=== Accolades ===
Award	Date of ceremony	Category	Recipient(s)	Result	Ref.
Camerimage	22 November 2025	Golden Frog	Tomasz Naumiuk	Nominated	
San Sebastián International Film Festival	27 September 2025	Golden Shell for Best Film	Franz	Nominated	
Czech Lion Awards	14 March 2026	Best Film	Franz	Nominated	
Czech Lion Awards	14 March 2026	Best Director	Agnieszka Holland	Nominated	
Czech Lion Awards	14 March 2026	Best Actor in Leading Role	Idan Weiss	Won	
Czech Lion Awards	14 March 2026	Best Supporting Actor	Peter Kurth	Nominated	
Czech Lion Awards	14 March 2026	Best Supporting Actor	Josef Trojan	Nominated	
Czech Lion Awards	14 March 2026	Best Supporting Actor	Ivan Trojan	Nominated	
Czech Lion Awards	14 March 2026	Best Supporting Actress	Jenovéfa Boková	Nominated	
Czech Lion Awards	14 March 2026	Best Screenplay	Marek Epstein, Agnieszka Holland	Nominated	
Czech Lion Awards	14 March 2026	Best Cinematography	Tomasz Naumiuk	Nominated	
Czech Lion Awards	14 March 2026	Best Music	Maria Komasa-Łazarkiewicz, Antoni Komasa-Łazarkiewicz	Nominated	
Czech Lion Awards	14 March 2026	Best Editing	Pavel Hrdlička	Nominated	
Czech Lion Awards	14 March 2026	Best Sound	Marek Hart, Michaela Patríková, Tomáš Bělohradský	Nominated	
Czech Lion Awards	14 March 2026	Best Stage Design	Henrich Boráros	Won	
Czech Lion Awards	14 March 2026	Best Makeup and Hairstyling	Gabriela Poláková	Won	
Czech Lion Awards	14 March 2026	Best Costume Design	Michaela Horáčková Hořejší	Won	

The film received the Grand Prix and the Youth Jury Award of the Tarnów Film Award (2026).

== See also ==
- List of submissions to the 98th Academy Awards for Best International Feature Film
- List of Polish submissions for the Academy Award for Best International Feature Film
