= Broken Voices =

2025 Czech thriller drama film

- Theatrical release poster
- Czech: Sbormistr
- Directed by: Ondřej Provazník
- Screenplay by: Ondřej Provazník
- Produced by: Jiří Konečný; Ivan Ostrochovský
- Starring: Kateřina Falbrová; Juraj Loj; Maya Kintera; Zuzana Šulajová
- Cinematography: Lukáš Milota
- Edited by: Anna Johnson Ryndová
- Music by: Jonathan Pastircak; Aid Kid
- Production companies: Endorfilm; Punkchart Films; Czech Television - Česká televize; Innogy; Barrandov Studios
- Distributed by: CinemArt
- Release dates: 6 July 2025 (KVIFF); 10 July 2025 (Czech Republic)
- Running time: 104 minutes
- Countries: Czech Republic; Slovakia
- Language: Czech
- Box office: US$1.02 million

Broken Voices (Czech: Sbormistr) is a 2025 thriller drama film written and directed by Ondřej Provazník. The primary impulse for the creation of the film was the sexual abuse scandal in the Bambini di Praga case.

The filmmakers state that the story is not a reconstruction of specific events, but rather a loose interpretation of them within a feature film

The film follows a twelve-year-old singer Karolína, who joins her sister in a prestigious girls' choir, where the strict guidance of demanding choirmaster Mácha begins to shape her aspirations.

The film, a Czech Republic and Slovak Republic co-production, premiered at 59th Karlovy Vary International Film Festival on 6 July 2025, where it was nominated for the Crystal Globe. The film was critically appreciated, and won Europa Cinemas Label Award as well as a Special Jury Mention for Kateřina Falbrová, for her performance as protagonist Karolína.

== Cast ==
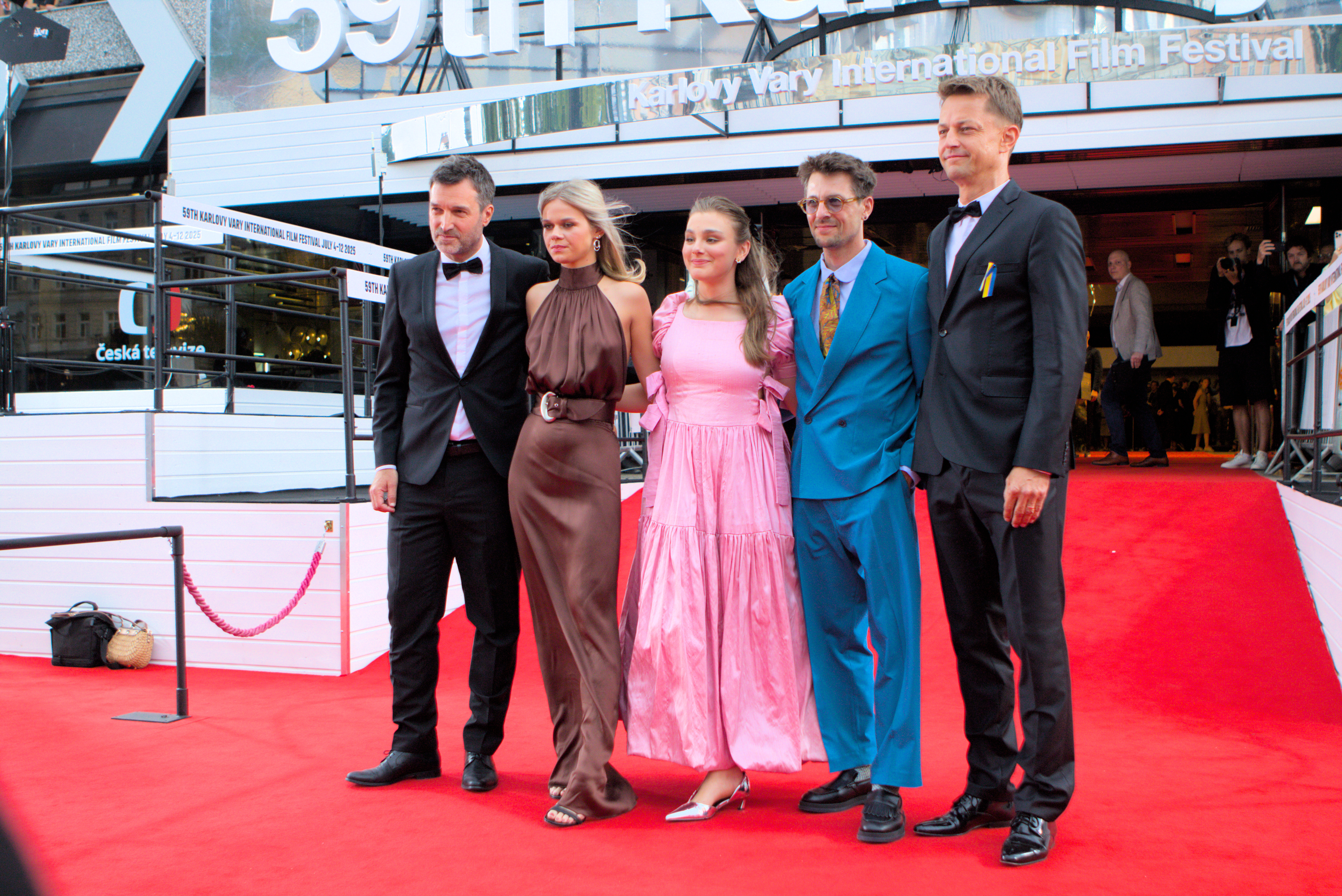
Cast and crew of the film at the 59th Karlovy Vary International Film Festival From (L to R) Ondřej Provazník, Maya Kintera, Kateřina Falbrová, Juraj Loj

- Kateřina Falbrová as Karolina
- Juraj Loj as Choirmaster Vit Macha
- Maya Kintera as Lucie
- Zuzana Šulajová as Mother of Karolina and Lucie
- Marek Cisovský as father of Karolina and Lucie
- Ivana Wojtylová as mother of the Choirmaster
- Anna Michalcová as Judita
- Anežka Novotná as Katka
- Markéta Kühnová as Andula
- Lucie Žáčková as mother of Judith

== Production ==
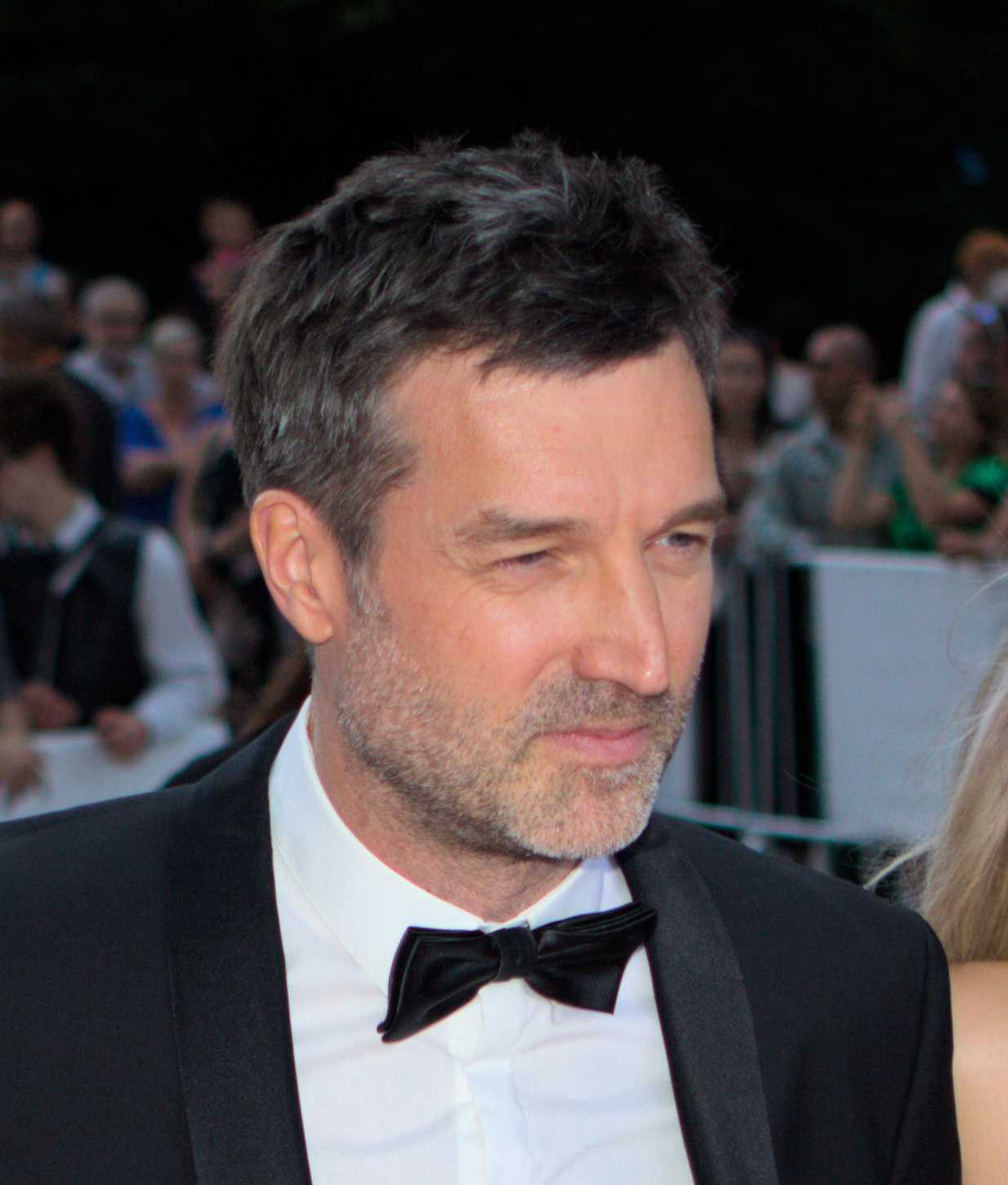
Ondřej Provazník, the director of the film at the 59th Karlovy Vary International Film Festival

Broken Voices is produced by Endorfilm in association with Punkchart Films, Czech Television, Innogy, and Barrandov Studios, with financial backing from several film institutions, including Eurimages and the Czech Audiovisual Fund. For the role of Karolína, the protagonist, newcomer Falbrová was chosen through a nationwide casting search. The part demanded acting talent and professional level vocal ability, as all choral performances were recorded live during filming.

The film was shot in Brno, Prague, Mladá Boleslav, the Jizera and Orlické Mountains, and New York City. In New York it was filmed in locations at Manhattan subway, Central Park, and Hotel Bossert in Brooklyn. Multivision Creative, a New York-based production services company helped in re-creating 1990s in New York City.

=== Music ===
The production brought together a diverse cast comprising both professional actresses and actual choir members to authentically recreate the dynamics of a real-life ensemble. The soundtrack combines classical choral music with contemporary touches from Czech producers Aid Kid and Jonathan Pastircak, whose subtle input highlights the film’s psychological depth while preserving its more subdued scenes.

== Release ==
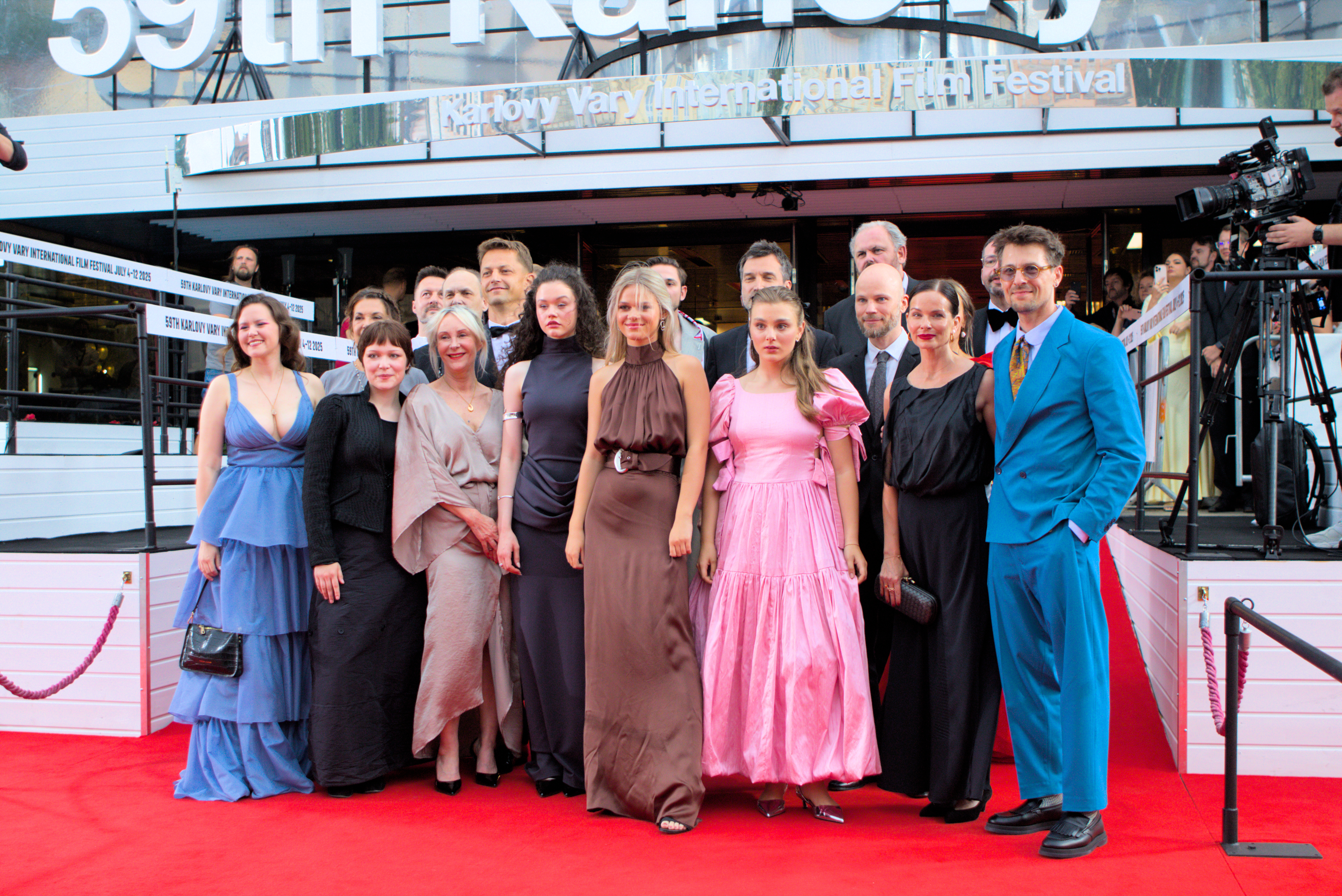
Delegation to the film Broken Voices at the 59th Karlovy Vary International Film Festival

Broken Voices had its premiere at the 59th Karlovy Vary International Film Festival on 6 July 2025, where it competed for the Crystal Globe with eleven other feature films. The trailer was released on 1 July 2025, just before the start of the festival by the Czech distributor Cinemart.

The film was showcased in the 'In Full View: Crisis, Conflict, Conscience' section at the 2025 Cinéfest Sudbury International Film Festival on 15 September 2025. On 3 October 2025, it was presented in the Panorama section of the 2025 Vancouver International Film Festival and competed at the Warsaw Film Festival in the Competition 1-2 section on 16 October 2025.

On 10 November 2025, it was presented in the Visions of the East section of the Arras Film Festival.

The film was presented in the New Voices New Visions section of the 37th Palm Springs International Film Festival on 2 January 2026.

The film will be presented in the feature films section of the 41st Santa Barbara International Film Festival in February 2026.

The film was released in Czech theatres on 17 July 2025.

The film was shortlisted along with two other films as the Czech Republic‘s Oscar submission for 98th Academy Awards, but did not make the shortlist.

In June 2025, the international rights of the film were acquired by distribution & production company Salaud Morisset.

== Reception ==
=== Critical response ===
On Kinobox, which lists 15 professional reviews, the film obtained an average rating of 77%. Its AI summary of the opinions of the professional community says, "Critics have received the film very positively, appreciating its artistic value and sensitive approach to a difficult subject."

Chase Hutchinson reviewing the film at the Karlovy Vary International Film Festival for TheWrap compared it to Damien Chazelle's 2014 film Whiplash and Kitty Green's 2019 film The Assistant. Hutchinson found the film "somewhere between the two" films made on the similar theme. In his opinion Broken Voices "is delicate in some moments yet devastating in others, doing justice to a true story."

Marta Balaga writing in Variety felt that Provazník rather than "showing the trial or its aftermath" explored how such incidents begin, which led him to seek insights from other real-life cases of sexual harassment: as Vanessa Springora’s memoir Consent "(describing abuse she experienced from author Gabriel Matzneff, which started when she was 14)", 2020 American web documentary television miniseries about convicted sex offender Jeffrey Epstein, Jeffrey Epstein: Filthy Rich and 2019 documentary television film Leaving Neverland. Balaga concluded her review with an advice, "‘If anything happens to you, please tell someone.’"

Veronica Orciari reviewing the film at the Karlovy Vary International Film Festival for Cineuropa opined, that "the strength of the film lie in its performances and visual storytelling." Praising the director, Orciari wrote, the film is delivered with remarkable subtlety and emotional grace, leaving a deep and lasting impact through its understated strength and genuine sentiment. Orciari concluded, "Broken Voices stands out as a profoundly moving and carefully crafted film."

Peter Debruge reviewing the film at the festival for Variety, noted that Provazník’s collaboration across departments contributed to a visually cohesive style. The use of earthy tones was intended to evoke the nostalgic warmth of 1980s family photographs, producing a look described as both intimate and enduring. He also observed that the film subtly reflects elements of Sofia Coppola’s impressionistic aesthetic, particularly referencing her 2017 film The Beguiled, in which a lone man is surrounded by young women, contributing to a mood of quiet tension. In conclusion, Debruge appreciated the director writing, "he’s to be commended for finding a poignant note on which to wrap such a sensitive, understated treatment of real-world abuse".

Mirka Spáčilová in iDNES.cz said, "Broken Voices is a film based primarily on the perspectives of young heroines, all of whom are excellent actors." Jordan Mintzer reviewing the film at the festival for The Hollywood Reporter described it as "A familiar tune performed with honesty and heart."

Jason Pirodsky at The Prague Reporter rated the film 3.5/5 stars and wrote that Broken Voices is a psychological drama that examines the concealed nature of abuse within relationships founded on trust. Pirodsky felt that the film avoids conventional narrative closure and instead emphasizes the revelation of a rarely addressed societal issue.

Wendy Ide in ScreenDaily praised the music, writing, "Music is central to the storytelling, with the choral performances impressive." Ide also commended the "production design and costume choices work". She liked the performance of Kateřina Falbrová, writing, "newcomer Falbrova is particularly impressive," and summed up the review with her opinion of the film as, "a sensitively structured psychological drama".

Damon Wise in Deadline praising the performances of Juraj Loj and Falbrová, writing that Loj gave "a masterclass in showing without telling," but in his opinion the film belonged to the newcomer Kateřina Falbrová, "whose finely tuned performance stems from a deep connection to both thought and sentiment."

=== Box office ===
The film was released in 165 theaters across the Czech Republic and in Slovakia in 58 theaters on 10 July 2025. It opened with US$176,221 in Czech Republic.

As of 14 September 2025, it grossed a total of US$1,022,228 worldwide, including US$909,831 in the Czech Republic and US$112,397 in Slovakia.

== Controversies ==
It was reported in July 2025 that when The Czech Film and Television Academy (ČFTA) urged its members to vote for Broken Voices as the Czech Republic’s Oscar submission from a shortlist of three films, it sparked criticism from some in the film industry who viewed the recommendation as "manipulative" and "undemocratic." The ČFTA explained that its recommendation was based on the film’s strong international appeal, media coverage, and Oscar campaign readiness.

Radovan Síbrt, a senior ČFTA member, publicly condemned Broken Voices in August 2025. Síbrt, whose sister was abused in the real Bambini di Praga choir scandal depicted in the film, argued that the filmmakers failed to respect victims’ consent and sensitivity, claiming the story and the main character’s name closely mirror his sister’s experience, causing renewed trauma. While ČFTA acknowledged his concerns, it stated that it is not empowered to judge ethical disputes and must focus solely on artistic merit and awards potential. In response, the film’s director and producer rejected the accusations, insisting Broken Voices is a fictional work inspired by broader patterns of abuse, created with legal and ethical care, and not based on specific individuals.

== Accolades ==
Award	Date of ceremony	Category	Recipient(s)	Result	Ref
Karlovy Vary International Film Festival	12 July 2025	Crystal Globe Grand Prix	Broken Voices	Nominated	
Karlovy Vary International Film Festival	12 July 2025	Europa Cinemas Label Award	Broken Voices	Won	
Karlovy Vary International Film Festival	12 July 2025	Special Jury Mention	Kateřina Falbrová	Won	
Oldenburg International Film Festival	September 14, 2025	German Independence Award: Best Film (Audience Award)	Ondřej Provazník	Won	
Warsaw Film Festival	October 19, 2025	Competition 1-2 Award	Broken Voices	Nominated	
Tromsø International Film Festival	25 January 2026	FIPRESCI Prize	Broken Voices	Won	
Czech Lion Awards	14 March 2026	Best Film	Broken Voices	Nominated	
Czech Lion Awards	14 March 2026	Best Director	Ondřej Provazník	Nominated	
Czech Lion Awards	14 March 2026	Best Actor in Leading Role	Juraj Loj	Nominated	
Czech Lion Awards	14 March 2026	Best Actress in Leading Role	Kateřina Falbrová	Won	
Czech Lion Awards	14 March 2026	Best Supporting Actress	Maya Kintera	Nominated	
Czech Lion Awards	14 March 2026	Best Screenplay	Ondřej Provazník	Nominated	
Czech Lion Awards	14 March 2026	Best Cinematography	Lukáš Milota	Nominated	
Czech Lion Awards	14 March 2026	Best Music	Jonatan Pjoni Pastirčák, Aid Kid	Won	
Czech Lion Awards	14 March 2026	Best Editing	Anna Johnson Ryndová	Nominated	
Czech Lion Awards	14 March 2026	Best Sound	Juraj Mravec, Petr Čechák	Won	
Czech Lion Awards	14 March 2026	Best Stage Design	Irena Hradecká	Nominated	
Czech Lion Awards	14 March 2026	Best Makeup and Hairstyling	Eva Schwarzová	Nominated	
Czech Lion Awards	14 March 2026	Best Costume Design	Marek Cpin	Nominated	
Sun in a Net Awards	9 April 2026	Best Actor in Leading Role	Juraj Loj	Nominated	
Sun in a Net Awards	9 April 2026	Best Music	Jonatan Pjoni Pastirčák, Aid Kid	Nominated	

== See also ==
- List of submissions to the 98th Academy Awards for Best International Feature Film
- List of Czech submissions for the Academy Award for Best International Feature Film
