= Caravan (2025 film) =

2025 film by Zuzana Kirchnerová

- Festival poster
- Czech: Karavan
- Directed by: Zuzana Kirchnerová
- Screenplay by: Zuzana Kirchnerová; Tomáš Bojar; Kristina Májová
- Produced by: Jakub Viktorín; Dagmar Sedláčková; Carlo Cresto-Dina; Ilaria Malagutti
- Starring: Anna Geislerová; David Vodstrčil; Juliana Brutovská-Oľhová; Mario Russo; Jana Plodková; Giandomenico Cupaiulo
- Cinematography: Dušan Husár; Denisa Buranová
- Edited by: Adam Brotánek
- Production companies: MasterFilm; Nutprodukcia; Tempesta
- Release dates: 22 May 2025 (Cannes); 28 August 2025 (Czech Republic)
- Running time: 100 minutes
- Countries: Czech Republic; Slovakia; Italy
- Language: Czech

Caravan (Czech: Karavan) is a 2025 drama road film co-written and directed by Zuzana Kirchnerová in her feature directorial debut. It stars Anna Geislerová, David Vodstrčil, Juliana Brutovská-Oľhová, Mario Russo and Jana Plodková. The film had its world premiere in the Un Certain Regard section of the 78th Cannes Film Festival on 22 May 2025, and was theatrically released in the Czech Republic on 28 August 2025.

== Premise ==
Ester, a burned out mother, embarks on an Italian road trip with her intellectually disabled son, David.

== Cast ==
- Anna Geislerová as Ester
- David Vodstrčil as David
- Juliana Brutovská-Oľhová as Zuza
- Mario Russo as Marco
- Jana Plodková as Petra
- Giandomenico Cupaiulo as Tommaso

== Production ==
The film was announced in 2019, but production was delayed due to the COVID-19 pandemic. Writer-director Zuzana Kirchnerová drew inspiration for the film from her own experiences raising a child with Down syndrome and autism. Principal photography took place in 2023. The film was shot over five weeks in Reggio Calabria, specifically Melito di Porto Salvo, Bova, Bova Marina, Palizzi, Condofuri, Montebello Ionico, Roghudi, San Lorenzo, Brancaleone, and Locri. Filming also took place near Bologna and in the South Moravian Region of the Czech Republic.

== Release ==
Alpha Violet acquired the sales rights to the film in late April 2025. The film was screened in the Un Certain Regard section of the 78th Cannes Film Festival on 22 May 2025. It received a theatrical release in the Czech Republic on 28 August 2025.

== Reception ==
On the review aggregator website Rotten Tomatoes, 100% of 12 critics' reviews are positive.

=== Accolades ===
Award	Date of ceremony	Category	Recipient(s)	Result	Ref.
Cannes Film Festival	24 May 2025	Prix Un Certain Regard	Zuzana Kirchnerová	Nominated	
Cannes Film Festival	24 May 2025	Camera d'Or	Zuzana Kirchnerová	Nominated	
Czech Lion Awards	14 March 2026	Best Film	Caravan	Won	
Czech Lion Awards	14 March 2026	Best Supporting Actress	Juliána Brutovská	Won	
Czech Lion Awards	14 March 2026	Best Supporting Actress	Jana Plodková	Nominated	
Czech Lion Awards	14 March 2026	Best Director	Zuzana Kirchnerová	Nominated	
Czech Lion Awards	14 March 2026	Best Actor in Leading Role	David Vodstrčil	Nominated	
Czech Lion Awards	14 March 2026	Best Actress in Leading Role	Anna Geislerová	Nominated	
Czech Lion Awards	14 March 2026	Best Screenplay	Zuzana Kirchnerová, Tomáš Bojar, Kristina Májová	Nominated	
Czech Lion Awards	14 March 2026	Best Cinematography	Simona Weisslechner, Denisa Buranová	Nominated	
Czech Lion Awards	14 March 2026	Best Music	Aid Kid, Viera Marinová	Nominated	
Czech Lion Awards	14 March 2026	Best Editing	Adam Brothánek	Nominated	
Czech Lion Awards	14 March 2026	Best Sound	Martin Ženíšek, Michal Deliopulos, Klára Javoříková	Nominated	
Sun in a Net Awards	9 April 2026	Best Supporting Actress	Juliána Brutovská	Won	
