= Promise, I'll Be Fine =

2024 drama film by Katarína Gramatová

- Film poster
- Slovak: Hore je nebo, v doline som ja
- Directed by: Katarína Gramatová
- Screenplay by: Katarína Gramatová
- Story by: Katarína Gramatová; Igor Engler
- Produced by: Igor Engler; Julie Marková Žáčková
- Cinematography: Tomáš Kotas
- Edited by: Katarína Gramatová; Aleš Valtr
- Music by: 700 Feel
- Production companies: DRYEYE FILM
- Release date: 30 October 2024 (Tokyo)
- Running time: 92 minutes
- Countries: Slovakia; Czech Republic
- Language: Slovak

Promise, I'll Be Fine (Slovak: Hore je nebo, v doline som ja) is a 2024 Slovak-Czech coming-of-age drama film directed, written, and edited by Katarína Gramatová in her directorial debut. It stars Michal Záchenský as Enrique, a fifteen-year-old boy who uncovers a hidden side of his absent mother.

The film had its world premiere at the 37th Tokyo International Film Festival on 30 October 2024. It received seven nominations at the 2025 Czech Lion Awards and won the Best Director for Gramatová.

== Premise ==
Enrique, a fifteen-year-old boy, spends his summer at his grandmother's house in a Slovak village. His relationship with his absent mother is shaken after he hears gossip about her from the villagers.

== Cast ==
- Michal Záchenský as Enrique
- Eva Mores as Martina, Enrique's mother
- Jana Oľhová as grandmother

== Production ==
In March 2024, the project was in post-production and was presented during the Bratislava Industry Days. Principal photography took place in the village of Utekáč in the Poltár District of Slovakia. Gramatová spent a year in the village scouting local people and preparing them for their roles.

== Release ==
Promise, I'll Be Fine had its world premiere at the 37th Tokyo International Film Festival on 30 October 2024, competing for the Grand Prix. The film had its European premiere at the Special Screenings section of the 59th Karlovy Vary International Film Festival on 8 July 2025.

It was released in Czech theatres on 2 October 2025.

== Accolades ==
Award / Film Festival	Date of ceremony	Category	Recipient(s)	Result	Ref.
Czech Film Critics' Awards	7 February 2026	Best Audiovisual Work	Tomáš Kotas	Won	
Czech Film Critics' Awards	7 February 2026	innogy Award for Newcomer of the Year	Katarína Gramatová	Nominated	
Czech Lion Awards	14 March 2026	Best Film	Promise, I'll Be Fine	Nominated	
Czech Lion Awards	14 March 2026	Best Director	Katarína Gramatová	Won	
Czech Lion Awards	14 March 2026	Best Actor in a Leading Role	Michal Záchenský	Nominated	
Czech Lion Awards	14 March 2026	Best Screenplay	Katarína Gramatová	Nominated	
Czech Lion Awards	14 March 2026	Best Cinematography	Tomáš Kotas	Nominated	
Czech Lion Awards	14 March 2026	Best Music	700 Feel	Nominated	
Czech Lion Awards	14 March 2026	Best Sound	Anna Žihlová, Peter Hilčanský, and Samuel Perunko	Nominated	
Sun in a Net Awards	9 April 2026	Best Supporting Actress	Jana Oľhová	Nominated	
