= The Painted Bird (film) =

2019 Czech war drama film

- Theatrical release poster
- Directed by: Václav Marhoul
- Screenplay by: Václav Marhoul
- Based on: The Painted Bird by Jerzy Kosiński
- Produced by: Václav Marhoul
- Starring: Petr Kotlár; Nina Šunevič; Stellan Skarsgård; Udo Kier; Harvey Keitel; Jitka Čvančarová; Julian Sands; Ala Sakalova; Aleksei Kravchenko; Barry Pepper
- Cinematography: Vladimír Smutný
- Edited by: Luděk Hudec
- Production companies: PubRes; Silver Screen
- Distributed by: Bioscop (Czech Republic); Magic Box (Slovakia); Arthouse Traffic (Ukraine)
- Release dates: 3 September 2019 (Venice); 12 September 2019 (Czech Republic)
- Running time: 169 minutes
- Countries: Czech Republic; Slovakia; Ukraine
- Languages: Interslavic; Czech; Russian; German
- Budget: 175 million CZK (USD$7.5 million)
- Box office: $662,505

The Painted Bird (Czech: Nabarvené ptáče, Ukrainian: «Пофарбоване пташеня», romanized: Pofarbovane ptashenia, Interslavic: Kolorovana ptica) is a 2019 Czech war drama film written, directed and produced by Václav Marhoul. An adaptation of Jerzy Kosiński's novel of the same name, it is the first film to feature the Interslavic language; Marhoul stated that he decided to use Interslavic so that no Slavic nation would nationally identify with the story.

The Painted Bird was selected to play in competition at the 76th Venice International Film Festival and was chosen for 2019 Toronto International Film Festival as part of Special Presentations. The film also screened in the Dare strand at the 63rd BFI London Film Festival. It was selected as the Czech entry for the Best International Feature Film at the 92nd Academy Awards making the December shortlist. Its brutal scenes led to walkouts from audiences at the Venice, Toronto and London film festivals. Nonetheless, the film has received very positive reviews from critics, with many likening it to films by Andrei Tarkovsky. At the 35th Warsaw International Film Festival, the audience honored the film with a long ovation after its only screening. It won Best Director at the Kolkata International Film Festival in 2019.

== Plot ==
In a war-torn part of German-occupied East Europe during the Second World War, a young boy lives with his elderly aunt. Startled at her death, the boy accidentally sets the house ablaze and leaves. His further adventures are a series of horrific encounters with ignorance, exploitation, and depravity. In the first village he reaches, an old healer buys him, but he is later blamed for bad luck and thrown in a river. He is next taken in by a miller and his wife. After the miller gouges out the eyes of a younger man seen exchanging glances with his wife, the boy runs off. He meets Lekh, a bird breeder who treats him well. Lekh has sex with a wild woman whom local village women later brutally rape with a bottle for also having sex with their teenage sons, after which Lekh hangs himself. The boy leaves.

The boy finds a tame horse with a broken leg and takes it to the next village, where a villager kills it. Partisans ask the villagers to deliver him to the Germans, identifying him as a Jew. The German soldier tasked with executing the boy releases him. Later caught by SS guards who bring him to a local town, he is saved from execution. A local priest takes him in, but then arranges for him to lodge with a local man named Garbos, who proves to be a pedophile. The boy causes Garbos's gruesome death. After the well-meaning priest dies, his replacement has no use for the boy, and he is run out of the town.

The boy is then taken in by Labina. When her elderly husband dies, she coaxes the boy into performing sexual acts on her, beating him when he fails to perform and mocking his inadequacy by simulating sex with a goat. He later retaliates by killing the goat and tossing its head through Labina's window before running away.

The boy comes into contact with the Red Army. One of the Soviet officers, a sniper named Mitka, decides to take care of him temporarily. The boy watches Mitka kill several locals in reprisal for an attack on Russian soldiers. As the Russians decamp, they send the boy to an orphanage, where he is a loner and repeatedly tries to escape. He is beaten by a local anti-Semitic shopkeeper, whom he kills in revenge. A man named Nikodém comes to the orphanage, greets the boy tearfully as his son, and takes him home. The boy refuses to speak. Nikodém tries to explain why they sent him to his aunt and the boy protests angrily. He asks if he at least remembers his name, but the boy does not respond. Traveling by bus toward home, Nikodém falls asleep. His son notices a number tattooed on his father's arm and with his finger writes his name, Joska, on the bus window.

== Cast ==
- Petr Kotlár as Joska
- Nina Šunevič as Marta
- Ala Sakalova as Olga
- Udo Kier as Miller
- Michaela Doležalová as Miller's Wife
- Stellan Skarsgård as Hans
- Harvey Keitel as Priest
- Julian Sands as Garbos
- Júlia Vidrnáková as Labina
- Lech Dyblik as Lekh
- Aleksei Kravchenko as Gavrila
- Barry Pepper as Mitka
- Petr Vaněk as Nikodém
- Radim Fiala as Cossack
- Jitka Čvančarová as Ludmila
- Alexander Leopold Schank as SS Officer
- Alexander Minaev as Red Army officer
- Pavel Kříž as Avid man
- Zdeněk Pecha as worker
- Milan Šimáček as Horse owner
- Martin Nahálka as Red partisan
- Dominik Weber as Captain
- Andrej Polák as Doctor in orphanage
- Filip Kaňkovský as Merchant
- Lukáš Hložek

== Production ==
Václav Marhoul announced his intention to adapt Jerzy Kosiński's The Painted Bird in September 2012 when he secured rights for the story. Marhoul said that the film would have a budget of approximately 120 million CZK. He planned to secure finance during the following 2 years. The film received financial support of 15 million CZK from the Czech Film Fund in 2016.

The film entered production in 2017. Marhoul decided to shoot the film in seven phases. First phase finished on 7 May 2017. Filmmakers were filming around Ukrainian village Svalovych from 23 March 2017 to 12 April 2017. Some reshoots had to be made from 21 to 23 April 2017 in Brdy Military area. Second phase started in South Slovakia on 5 June 2017 to 5 July 2017. The film crew was shooting around Váh river, at Mlynská Dolina and in Malý Dunajec.

Shooting moved to Lipno Dam and Kvilda in February and March 2018. the crew had to deal with bad weather as they needed ice on the lake. Shooting concluded in July 2018 after 100 shooting days over 16 months. The film then entered post production. Post production concluded in February 2019.

For the villagers' dialogue, Marhoul decided to use the Interslavic language instead of any ethnic Slavic language:

I didn't want the villagers (speaking) Ukrainian or Polish or Russian or something like that because those people (the villagers in the film) are really bad people. [...] I didn't want some nation to be associated with that.

== Release ==
=== Theatrical ===
The first trailer for the film was released on 28 July 2019. The film had its worldwide premiere at the 76th Venice International Film Festival on 3 September 2019. The film was first projected in Czech cinemas for journalists on 11 September 2019. It entered distribution for Czech cinemas on 12 September 2019. The film had been originally scheduled to be released in May 2019.

IFC Films became the United States distributor in October 2019. The United States premiere was set for 10 July 2020. and the United Kingdom premiere was set for 27 March 2020.

=== Home media ===
The film was released on home media in the Czech Republic and Slovakia on 29 April 2020.

== Reception ==
=== Critical response ===
Review aggregator Rotten Tomatoes reports an approval rating of 82% based on 109 reviews, with an average rating of 7.5/10. The site's critics consensus reads: "Brutally uncompromising in its portrayal of Nazi Germany, The Painted Bird is a difficult watch that justifies its dark horror with searing impact." On Metacritic, the film has a weighted average score of 72 out of 100, based on 23 critics, indicating "generally favorable reviews".

The film was projected for journalists on 2 September 2019. Some people left the theatre as they could not stand the depicted violence and rape scenes. The Daily Mail described it as "a panoply of depravity.” Overall reception was positive as the film received a long ovation from the audience and some unofficial responses called it one of the front-runners for Golden Lion, but ultimately lost to Joker. Director Marhoul was particularly praised. The film also received a 10-minute standing ovation during its premiere on 3 September 2019.

Xan Brooks of The Guardian gave the film five stars, calling it a "savage, searing three-hour tour of hell" and "phantasmagorical horror, rattling around ravaged eastern Europe for just shy of three hours." He praised the film's visuals and atmosphere. Guy Lodge of Variety was also positive, noting camerawork by Vladimír Smutný. He called the film "muscular, savagely realized Jerzy Kosiński adaptation puts an unnamed Jewish boy through a challenging litany of Holocaust horrors."

In a more negative review, A.A. Dowd of The A.V. Club praised the film's cinematography while criticizing its bleak tone, saying "The Painted Bird is, in the end, the kind of slog that treats shopworn insights about the brutality of man as justification for drowning us in the evidence."

The Hollywood Reporter picked The Painted Bird as one of 20 best films projected at Film festivals during Fall 2019.

=== Box office ===
The film opened in Czech cinemas on 12 September 2019. It was attended by 26,094 people and grossed 4,034,060 CZK during the first weekend. The film grossed 14,267,334 CZK in Czech theatres, equal to $620,319.

=== Accolades ===
The Painted Bird was nominated for 11 Czech Lion Awards and has won 9 of them including the Best film.

Awards and nominations received by The Painted Bird
Year	Event	Award	Category	Recipient(s)	Result	Ref(s)
2019	Venice International Film Festival	Golden Lion	Best Film	The Painted Bird	Nominated	
2019	Venice International Film Festival	Cinema for UNICEF	Fight for children's rights	The Painted Bird	Won	
2019	Nový Bor Academy of United Cinematography	NASK Award	Contribution to Czech and World Cinematography	Václav Marhoul	Won	
2019	Chicago International Film Festival	Gold Hugo	Best Feature Film	The Painted Bird	Nominated	
2019	Chicago International Film Festival	Best Cinematography		Vladimír Smutný	Won	
2019	Camerimage	Golden Frog	Best Cinematography	Vladimír Smutný	Nominated	
2019	Camerimage	Bronze Frog	Main Competition	Vladimír Smutný	Won	
2019	Camerimage	FIPRESCI AWARD	Enterprising film making	Vladimír Smutný	Won	
2019	Listapad	Grand Prix Golden Listapad	Best film	The Painted Bird	Nominated	
2019	Kolkata International Film Festival	Golden Royal Bengal Tiger	Best Director	Václav Marhoul	Won	
2019	17th Warsaw Jewish Film Festival	Camera of David	Best Screenplay	Václav Marhoul	Won	
2019	17th Warsaw Jewish Film Festival	Camera of David	Best Cinematography	Vladimír Smutný	Won	
2020	24th Satellite Awards	Satellite Award	Best Foreign Language Film	The Painted Bird	Nominated	
2020	Trilobit Awards 2020	Beroun Gossip	Audience Award	The Painted Bird	Won	
2020	9th Czech Film Critics' Awards	Czech Film Critics' Award	Best Film	The Painted Bird	Nominated	
2020	9th Czech Film Critics' Awards	Czech Film Critics' Award	Best Director	Václav Marhoul	Nominated	
2020	9th Czech Film Critics' Awards	Czech Film Critics' Award	Best Audiovisual Work	Vladimír Smutný (Filmography)	Won	
2020	9th Czech Film Critics' Awards	Czech Film Critics' Award	Best Audiovisual Work	Jan Vlasák (Production Design)	Nominated	
2020	27th Czech Lion Awards	Czech Lion Award	Best Film	The Painted Bird	Won	
2020	27th Czech Lion Awards	Czech Lion Award	Best Director	Václav Marhoul	Won	
2020	27th Czech Lion Awards	Czech Lion Award	Best Actor in Leading Role	Petr Kotlár	Nominated	
2020	27th Czech Lion Awards	Czech Lion Award	Best Supporting Actress	Jitka Čvančarová	Nominated	
2020	27th Czech Lion Awards	Czech Lion Award	Best Screenplay	Václav Marhoul	Nominated	
2020	27th Czech Lion Awards	Czech Lion Award	Best Editing	Luděk Hudec	Won	
2020	27th Czech Lion Awards	Czech Lion Award	Best Cinematography	Vladimír Smutný	Won	
2020	27th Czech Lion Awards	Czech Lion Award	Best Stage Design	Jan Vlasák	Won	
2020	27th Czech Lion Awards	Czech Lion Award	Best Makeup and Hairstyling	Ivo Strangmüller	Won	
2020	27th Czech Lion Awards	Czech Lion Award	Best Costume Design	Helena Rovná	Won	
2020	27th Czech Lion Awards	Czech Lion Award	Best Sound	Pavel Rejholec	Won	
2020	27th Czech Lion Awards	Czech Lion Award	Extraordinary Audiovisual Achievement	Václav Marhoul	Won	
2020	27th Czech Lion Awards	Czech Lion Award	Best Film Poster	Roman Mrázek	Won	
2020	33rd Finále Plzeň Film Festival	Golden Kingfisher	Best Feature Live Action or Animated Film	The Painted Bird	Nominated	
2020	33rd European Film Awards	European Film Award	Best Film	The Painted Bird	Nominated	

=== International festivals ===
The film was selected to appear on various International film festivals. It includes:

- Venice International Film Festival
- Toronto International Film Festival
- Saint Petersburg International Film Festival
- BFI London Film Festival
- Kolkata International Film Festival
- Warsaw International Film Festival
- Chicago International Film Festival
- Vancouver International Film Festival
- Tokyo International Film Festival
- Camerimage
- Cairo International Film Festival
- International Film Festival of India
- Helsinki International Film Festival
- Berlin International Film Festival
- AFI European Union Film Showcase
- Palm Springs International Film Festival
- São Paulo International Film Festival

== See also ==
- List of submissions to the 92nd Academy Awards for Best International Feature Film
- List of Czech submissions for the Academy Award for Best International Feature Film
- List of most expensive Czech films
- The Ugly Black Bird
