= Zuzana Kirchnerová =

Czech filmmaker (born 1978)

- Born: 1978 (age 47–48); Sokolov, Czechoslovakia
- Education: Charles University; Film and TV School of the Academy of Performing Arts in Prague
- Occupations: Director; screenwriter
- Years active: 2008–present
- Spouse: Šimon Špidla (m. 2008)
- Children: 2
- Relatives: Vladimír Špidla (father-in-law)

Zuzana Kirchnerová (born 1978) is a Czech film director and screenwriter.

== Biography ==
Kirchnerová was born in Sokolov in 1978. In the 1990s, she worked part-time at the Karlovy Vary International Film Festival. She later graduated with a degree in law from Charles University and a bachelor's degree in directing from the Film and TV School of the Academy of Performing Arts in Prague.

Her short film Bába won the Cinéfondation competition at the 2009 Cannes Film Festival. She later produced the docu-soaps Čtyři v tom and Pět statečných for Czech Television. Her debut feature film, Caravan, was screened in the Un Certain Regard competition of the 2025 Cannes Film Festival.

=== Personal life ===
Kirchnerová married Šimon Špidla, the son of former Prime Minister Vladimír Špidla, in 2008. She has two sons. Her older son was born with Down syndrome and diagnosed with autism spectrum disorder at the age of four.

== Filmography ==
=== Film ===
Year	Title	Director	Writer	Notes	Ref.
2008	Bába	Yes	Yes	Short film	
2025	Caravan	Yes	Yes	Co-written with Tomáš Bojar and Kristina Májová	

=== Television ===
Year	Title	Director	Writer	Notes	Ref.
2026	Monyová	Yes	No	Also series' co-creator	

== Awards and nominations ==
Award	Year	Category	Nominated work	Result	Ref.
Cannes Film Festival	2009	Cinéfondation	Bába	Won	
Cannes Film Festival	2025	Un Certain Regard	Caravan	Nominated	
Czech Lion Awards	2026	Best Director	Caravan	Nominated	
Czech Lion Awards	2026	Best Screenplay	Caravan	Nominated	
