= Summer School, 2001 =

2025 Czech drama film

- Directed by: Dužan Duong
- Written by: Lukáš Kokeš; Jan Smutný; Dužan Duong
- Produced by: Lukáš Kokeš; Dužan Duong
- Starring: The Duong Bui; Anh Doan Hoang; Lê Quỳnh Lan; Tien Tai To; Dũng Nguyễn
- Cinematography: Adam Mach
- Edited by: Jakub Jelínek; Jakub Podmanický
- Music by: Jonatán Pastirčák
- Distributed by: Aerofilms
- Release dates: 24 July 2025 (Czech Republic); 19 June 2026 (Vietnam)
- Running time: 102 minutes
- Countries: Czech Republic; Vietnam
- Languages: Vietnamese; Czech
- Box office: 3,952,546 CZK

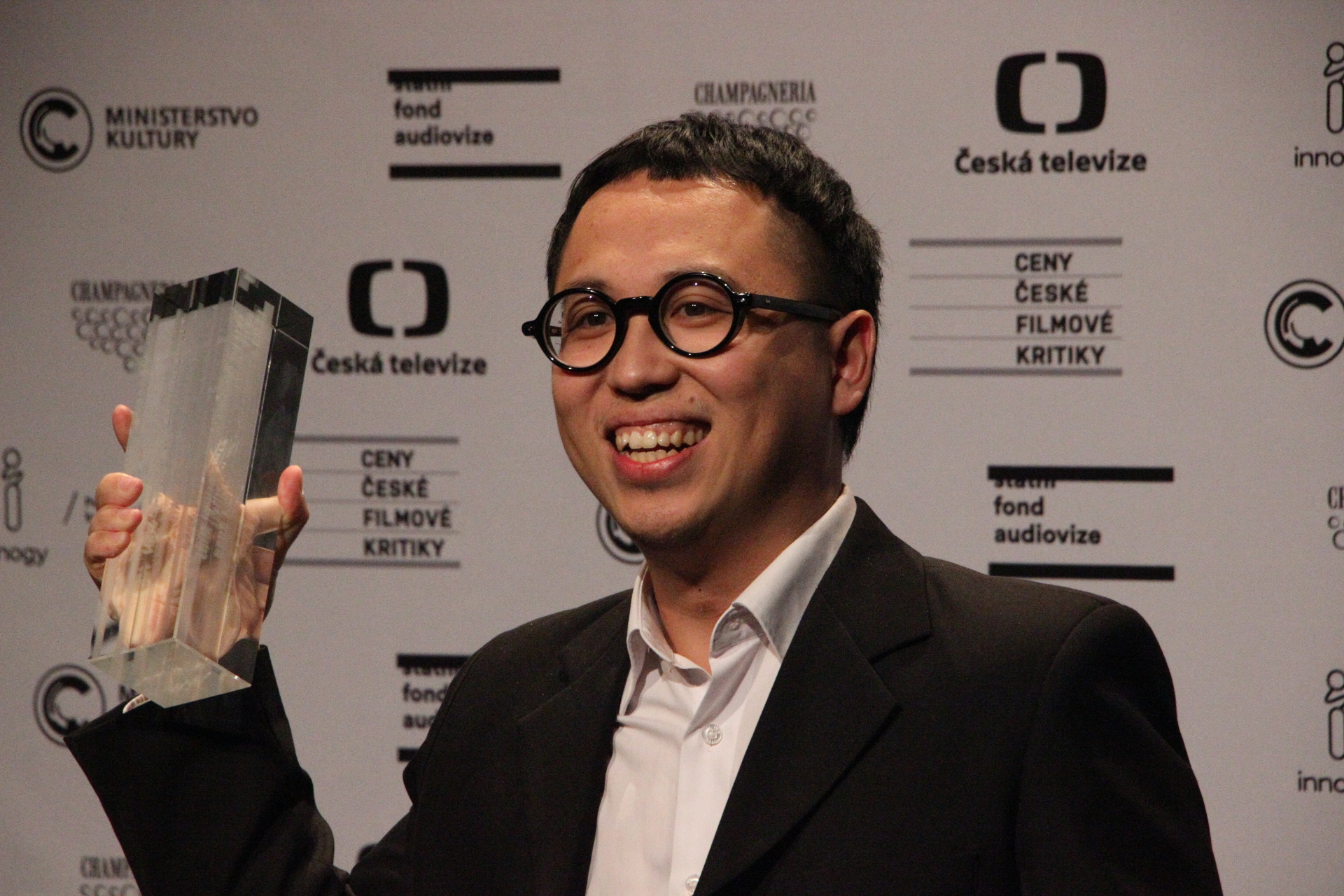
Director Dužan Duong

Summer School, 2001 (Czech: Letní škola, 2001) is a 2025 drama film directed by Dužan Duong. Duong also co-wrote the film with Lukáš Kokeš and Jan Smutný, drawing inspiration from his own childhood experiences. The film tells the story of a complicated family relationship between a father and son in a Vietnamese market in the Czech Republic in 2001.

Czech Television was a co-producer of the film. It was supported by the State Audiovisual Fund, the Audiovisual Fund and the Pilsen Region, and was also financed by the Next Generation EU projects of the European Union and the National Reconstruction Plan of the Ministry of Culture of the Czech Republic.

It was first shown at the 59th Karlovy Vary International Film Festival, and premiered in Czech cinemas on 24 July 2025.

In January 2026, the film was nominated for two Czech Film Critics' Awards, in the categories of Best Screenplay (Dužan Duong, Jan Smutný, Lukáš Kokeš) and the Innogy Award for Discovery of the Year (Dužan Duong). That same month, the film received eight nominations at the 2025 Czech Lion Awards, including Best Film.

== Plot ==
Kien, a 17-year-old Vietnamese man, arrives in Cheb in 2001, where his family runs a stall at the local Vietnamese market. After ten years, he reunites with his parents and younger brother, who still live in Vietnam. The film has three narrative perspectives: the father's, the elder son's, and the younger son's.

== Cast ==
- The Duong Bui as Kien
- Anh Doan Hoang as Zung, Kien's father
- Lê Quỳnh Lan as Lan, Kien's mother
- Tien Tai To as Tai, Kien's brother
- Dũng Nguyễn as Phong
- Thang Xuan Ngo as Viktor
- Xuan Tiem To as Long
- Thi Pham Nhung as Hiên

== Accolades ==
Awards and nominations received by Summer School, 2001
Year	Award	Category	Recipient	Result	Ref(s)
2026	Czech Film Critics' Awards	Best Screenplay	Dužan Duong, Jan Smutný, Lukáš Kokeš	Won	
2026	Czech Film Critics' Awards	Innogy Award for Discovery of the Year	Dužan Duong	Won	
2026	Czech Lion Awards	Best Film	Lukáš Kokeš, Dužan Duong	Nominated	
2026	Czech Lion Awards	Best Director	Dužan Duong	Nominated	
2026	Czech Lion Awards	Best Actress in Leading Role	Quỳnh Lan Lê	Nominated	
2026	Czech Lion Awards	Best Supporting Actor	Dũng Nguyễn	Won	
2026	Czech Lion Awards	Best Screenplay	Dužan Duong, Jan Smutný, Lukáš Kokeš	Won	
2026	Czech Lion Awards	Best Editing	Jakub Jelínek, Jakub Podmanický	Nominated	
2026	Czech Lion Awards	Best Stage Design	Marek František Đỏ Špitálský	Nominated	
2026	Czech Lion Awards	Best Costume Design	Veronika Varcholová	Nominated	
