= Czech Film Critics' Award for Best Screenplay =

- Country: Czech Republic
- First award: 2010
- Currently held by: Dužan Duong, Jan Smutný, Lukáš Kokeš
- Website: filmovakritika.cz

Czech Film Critics' Award for Best Screenplay is one of the awards given to the best Czech motion picture.

== Winners ==
Year	English Name	Original Name	Writer
2010	Walking Too Fast	Pouta	Ondřej Štindl
2011	Long Live the Family!	Rodina je základ státu	Robert Sedláček
2012	Four Suns	Čtyři slunce	Bohdan Sláma
2013	Burning Bush	Hořící keř	Štěpán Hulík
2014	The Way Out	Cesta ven	Petr Václav
2015	Lost in Munich	Ztraceni v Mnichově	Petr Zelenka
2016	Family Film	Rodinný film	Olmo Omerzu, Nebojša Pop-Tasić
2017	Ice Mother	Bába z ledu	Bohdan Sláma
2018	Bear with Us	Chata na prodej	Tomáš Pavlíček, Lucie Bokšteflová
2019	Owners	Vlastníci	Jiří Havelka
2020	Droneman	Modelář	Petr Zelenka
2021	Occupation	Okupace	Marek Šindelka, Vojtěch Mašek
2022	Arved	Arvéd	Jan Poláček, Vojtěch Mašek
2023	The Exhale	Němá tajemství	Alice Nellis
2024	Year of the Widow	Rok vdovy	Eugen Liška
2025	Summer School, 2001	Letní škola, 2001	Dužan Duong, Jan Smutný, Lukáš Kokeš
