= Czech Lion Award for Best Supporting Actor =

Czech film award

- Country: Czech Republic
- First award: 1994
- Currently held by: Dũng Nguyễn (Summer School, 2001)
- Website: https://www.filmovaakademie.cz

Czech Lion Award for Best Supporting Actor is an annual award given to the best male actor in a supporting role of a Czech film.

== Winners ==
Year	Actor	Film title (English)	Film title (Original)
1994	Jiří Lábus (1)	America	Amerika
1995	Marián Labuda (1)	The Garden	Zahrada
1996	Andrey Khalimon (1)	Kolya	Kolja
1997	Jiří Kodet (1)	Buttoners	Knoflíkáři
1998	Miroslav Donutil (1)	Traps	Pasti, pasti, pastičky
1999	Jiří Bartoška (1)	All My Loved Ones	Všichni moji blízcí
2000	Jiří Macháček (1)	Loners	Samotáři
2001	Stanislav Zindulka (1)	Autumn Spring	Babí léto
2002	Ivan Trojan (1)	Seducer	Musím tě svést
2003	Ivan Trojan (2)	One Hand Can't Clap	Jedna ruka netleská
2004	Jan Budař (1)	Champions	Mistři
2005	Miroslav Krobot (1)	Wrong Side Up	Příběhy obyčejného šílenství
2006	Martin Huba (1)	I Served the King of England	Obsluhoval jsem anglického krále
2007	Jan Budař (2)	Václav	Václav
2008	Vladimír Dlouhý (1)	Guard No. 47	Hlídač č. 47
2009	Ladislav Chudík (1)	Kawasaki's Rose	Kawasakiho růže
2010	Vladimír Dlouhý (2)	Kajínek	Kajínek
2011	Hynek Čermák (1)	Innocence	Nevinnost
2012	Ondřej Vetchý (1)	Sunday League - Pepik Hnatek's Final Match	Okresní přebor – Poslední zápas Pepika Hnátka
2013	Jiří Lábus (1)	Clownwise	Klauni
2014	Jaroslav Plesl (1)	Nowhere in Moravia	Díra u Hanušovic
2015	Kryštof Hádek (1)	Snake Brothers	Kobry a užovky
2016	Oldřich Kaiser (1)	A Prominent Patient	Masaryk
2017	Oldřich Kaiser (2)	Barefoot	Po strništi bos
2018	Jan František Uher (1)	Winter Flies	Všechno bude
2019	Ladislav Mrkvička (1)	Old-Timers	Staříci
2020	Jiří Mádl (1)	Droneman	Modelář
2021	Oldřich Kaiser (3)	The Man With Hare Ears	Muž se zaječíma ušima
2022	Marsell Bendig (1)	BANGER.	BANGER.
2023	Tomáš Jeřábek (1)	Volga	Volha
2024	Stanislav Majer (1)	Waves	Vlny
2025	Dũng Nguyễn (1)	Summer School, 2001	Letní škola, 2001
