= Julius Ševčík =

Czech director and screenwriter

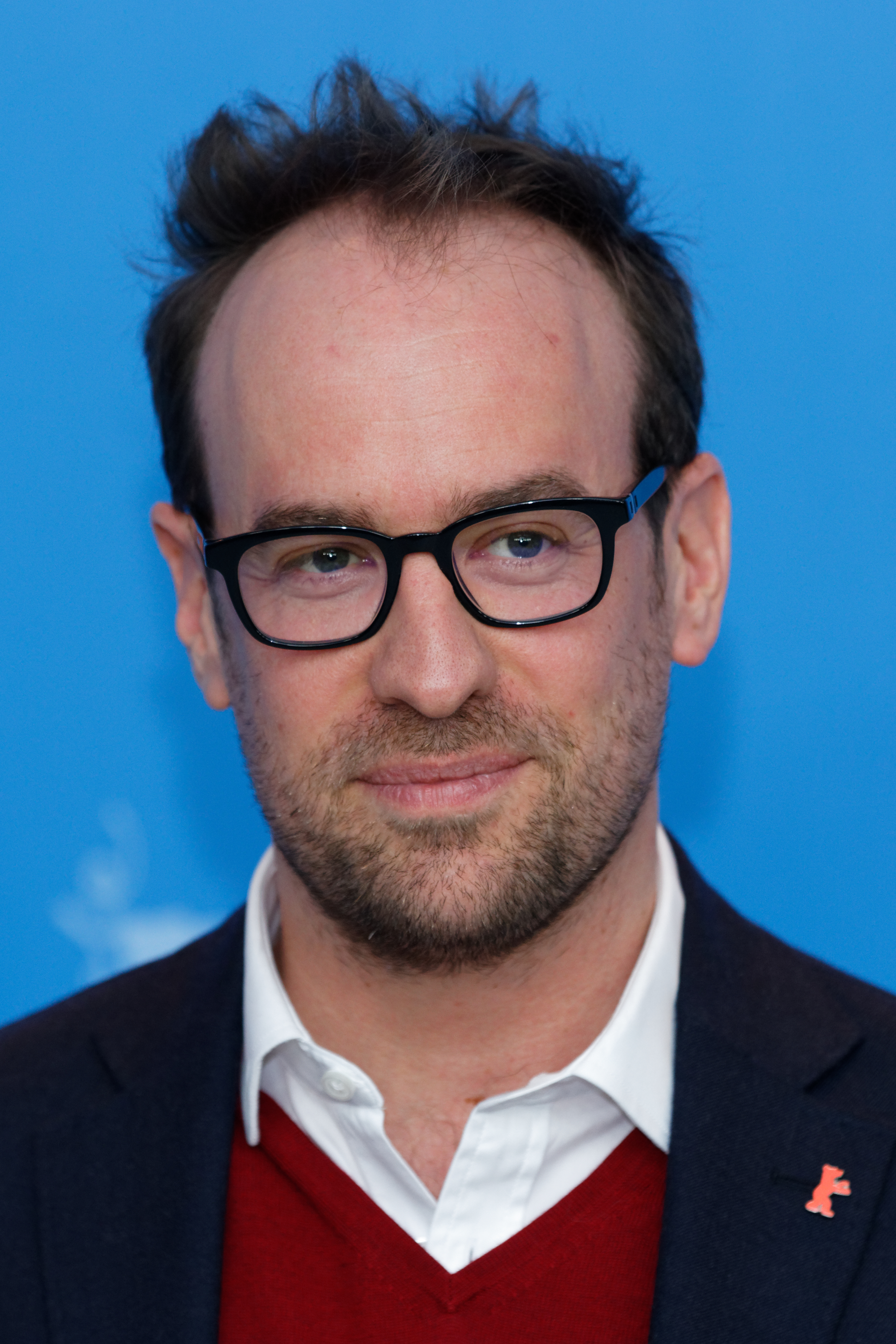
- Julius Ševčík at Berlinale 2017
- Born: 28 October 1978; Prague
- Alma mater: Film and TV School of the Academy of Performing Arts in Prague; New York Film Academy
- Occupation: Film director; screenwriter; film producer
- Awards: Czech Lion Award for Best Film (A Prominent Patient, 2016); Czech Lion Award for Best Director (A Prominent Patient, 2016); Czech Lion Award for Best Screenplay (A Prominent Patient, 2016)

Julius Ševčík (born 28 October 1978, in Prague) is a Czech director and screenwriter.

His 2016 film A Prominent Patient won twelve Czech Lions. Ševčík studied directing at Film and TV School of the Academy of Performing Arts in Prague and New York Film Academy. In 2013 he was attached to direct Christopher Nolan's script The Keys to the Street, adapted from Ruth Rendell's novel.

== Filmography ==
Film
Year	Title	Role	Awards
2005	Restart	director, screenwriter	
2009	Normal	director, screenwriter	
2016	A Prominent Patient	director, screenwriter	Czech Lion for Best Film, Best Director and Best Screenplay
2019	The Glass Room	director	
