= Czech Lion Award for Best Television Miniseries or Series =

Czech media award

- Country: Czech Republic
- First award: 2024
- Currently held by: Studna
- Website: https://www.filmovaakademie.cz

Czech Lion Award for Best Television Miniseries or Series is one of the awards given to the best Czech television series category was founded in 2024 by merger of Best Television Series award and Best Television Film or Miniseries award which were founded in 2015.

== Winners ==
Year	English Name	Original Name	Director	Original network
2024	The Markovič Method: Hojer	Metoda Markovič: Hojer	Pavel Soukup	TV Nova
2025	The Well	Studna	Tereza Kopáčová	TV Nova
