= Bába (2008 film) =

2008 film

- Directed by: Zuzana Kirchnerová
- Written by: Zuzana Kirchnerová
- Produced by: Kristina Dufková; Anna Purkrábková
- Starring: Marika Šoposká
- Cinematography: Lukas Hyksa
- Edited by: Simon Spidla
- Release date: 2008
- Running time: 22 minutes
- Country: Czech Republic
- Language: Czech

Bába is a 2008 Czech short drama film directed by Zuzana Kirchnerová. It won the 1st Prize in the Cinéfondation section at the 2009 Cannes Film Festival.

== Cast ==
- Marika Šoposká as Veronika
- Ondřej Havel as Lukás
- Miluše Šplechtová as Mother
