= Moloch (miniseries) =

- Genre: Political Thriller
- Written by: Štefan Titka
- Directed by: Lukáš Hanulák
- Starring: Miroslav Donutil; Jan Révai; Eliza Rycembel
- Countries of origin: Czech Republic; Slovakia; Ukraine
- Original language: Czech
- No. of seasons: 1
- No. of episodes: 3

Production
- Running time: 55 minutes
- Production companies: Bionaut; Raketa

Original release
- Network: Canal+ Czech Republic
- Release: 27 May – 10 June 2025

Moloch is a political thriller series. It is second project of Czech Canal+. It is the first series from Central Europe to receive support from Eurimages’ Pilot Programme for Series Coproductions. It is also backed by incentives programme of the Czech Film Fund and the Slovak Audiovisual Fund.

== Plot ==
After an assassination attempt on the president of the Czech Republic, investigative journalist Martin Braun teams up with a young online investigator Julie to uncover truth behind the attack. They become entangled in a dangerous game of secret services, international politics and forces determined to conceal the truth for various reasons. People are dying on the way to find the truth. Martin and Julie must find out what happened soon if they don't want to end the same way.

== Cast ==
- Miroslav Donutil as Viktor Toman, President of the Czech Republic
- Jan Révai as Martin Braun, investigative journalist
- Eliza Rycembel as Julie, online investigator
- Klára Issová as Táňa Rufusová, director of communication
- Jiří Chadraba as assistant Jakub
- Andrea Mohylová as policewoman Jana Müllerová
- Vladimír Kratina as Lukáš Braun, Martin's father
- Barbara Lukešová as Pavla Krausová, Prime Minister of the Czech Republic
- David Matásek as Antonín Lehovec, director of BIS
- Beáta Kaňoková as presidents daughter
- Ivana Andrlová as First Lady of the Czech Republic
- Martina Jindrová as Dominika Svátková
- Daria Plakhtii as Acton Bell
- Kryštof Bartoš as Josef Špaček, BIS agent
- Zdeněk Junák as Karel Sudek

== Episodes ==
No.	Title	Directed by	Written by	Original release date	Czech viewers (millions)
1	"Acton Bell"	Lukáš Hanulák	Štefan Titka	27 May 2025	N/A
2	"Vědomí a svědomí"	Lukáš Hanulák	Štefan Titka	3 June 2025	N/A
3	"V kruhu"	Lukáš Hanulák	Štefan Titka	10 June 2025	N/A

== Production ==
Screenwriter Štefan Titka created the miniseries concept with director Lukáš Hanulák and Vratislav Šlajer. He said that topic of the series became actual with recent the assassination attempts on Donald Trump and Slovak Prime Minister Robert Fico.

Shooting started on 22 July 2024 in the Czech Republic. Shooting is set to continue until the end of October 2024 in Slovakia and Ukraine. Premiere is set for Spring 2025.
