= Czech Lion Award for Best Film Poster =

Czech film award

- Country: Czech Republic
- First award: 1998
- Currently held by: Franz
- Website: https://www.filmovaakademie.cz

Czech Lion Award for Best Film Poster is award given to the Czech film with the best film poster.

== Winners ==
Year	English Name	Original Name	Author
1998	The Bed	Postel	Michal Cihlář
1999	Cosy Dens	Pelíšky	Aleš Najbrt
2000	Wild Flowers	Kytice	Juraj Jakubisko
2001	Little Otik	Otesánek	Eva Švankmajerová
2002	Year of the Devil	Rok ďábla	Josef Jelínek
2003	Sentiment	Sentiment	Tomáš Machek
2004	Up and Down	Horem pádem	Aleš Najbrt
2005	Lunacy	Šílení	Eva Švankmajerová
2006	I Served the King of England	Obsluhoval jsem anglického krále	AQS a.s.
2007	It's Gonna Get Worse	...a bude hůř	Martin Kaiser
2008	The Karamazovs	Karamazovi	Aleš Najbrt, Bohumil Vašák
2009	Protector	Protektor	Aleš Najbrt
2010	Kooky	Kuky se vrací	Petr Štěpán
2011	Alois Nebel	Alois Nebel	Robert V. Novák
2012	In the Shadow	Ve stínu	Marius Corradini
2013	Burning Bush	Hořící keř	Studio 2fresh, Dušan Martinček
2014	Fair Play	Fair Play	Tomáš Machek, Marius Corradini
2015	The Snake Brothers	Kobry a užovky	Michal Tilsch
2016	I, Olga Hepnarová	Já, Olga Hepnarová	Lukáš Veverka
2017	Barefoot	Po strništi bos	Jiří Karásek, Lukáš Fišárek
2018	Toman	Toman	Tomáš Zilvar, Lukáš Francl, Barbara Trojanová, Maxmilian Denkr
2019	The Painted Bird	Nabarvené ptáče	Roman Mrázek
2020	Shadow Country	Krajina ve stínu	Jan Poukar
2021	Zátopek	Zátopek	Aleš Najbrt, Jakub Spurný, Julie Vrabelová
2022	Arvéd	Arvéd	Soňa Juríková, Vojtěch Mašek
2023	The Exhale	Němá tajemství	Robert V. Novák, Zuzana Burgrová
2024	Girl America	Amerikánka	Jan Kadlec, Jan Poukar
2025	Franz	Franz	Michal Čermín
