= Vladimír Dlouhý (actor) =

Czech actor

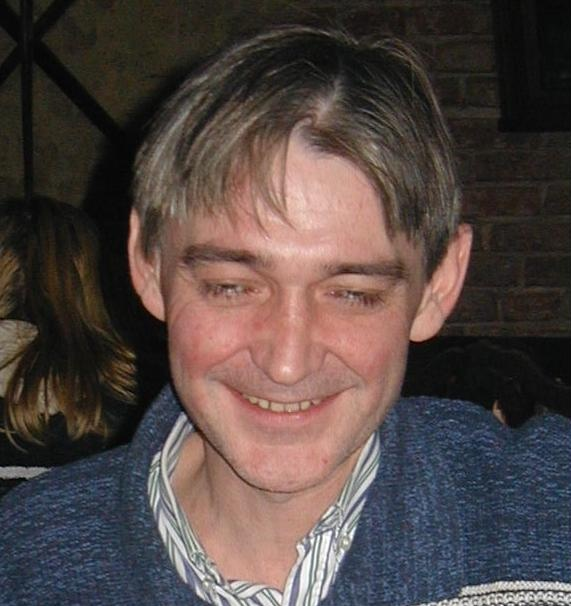
- Vladimír Dlouhý in 2008
- Born: 10 June 1958; Prague, Czechoslovakia
- Died: 20 June 2010 (aged 52); Prague, Czech Republic
- Occupation: Actor
- Years active: 1971–2010
- Spouse: Petra Jungmanová (m. 2008)
- Children: 3

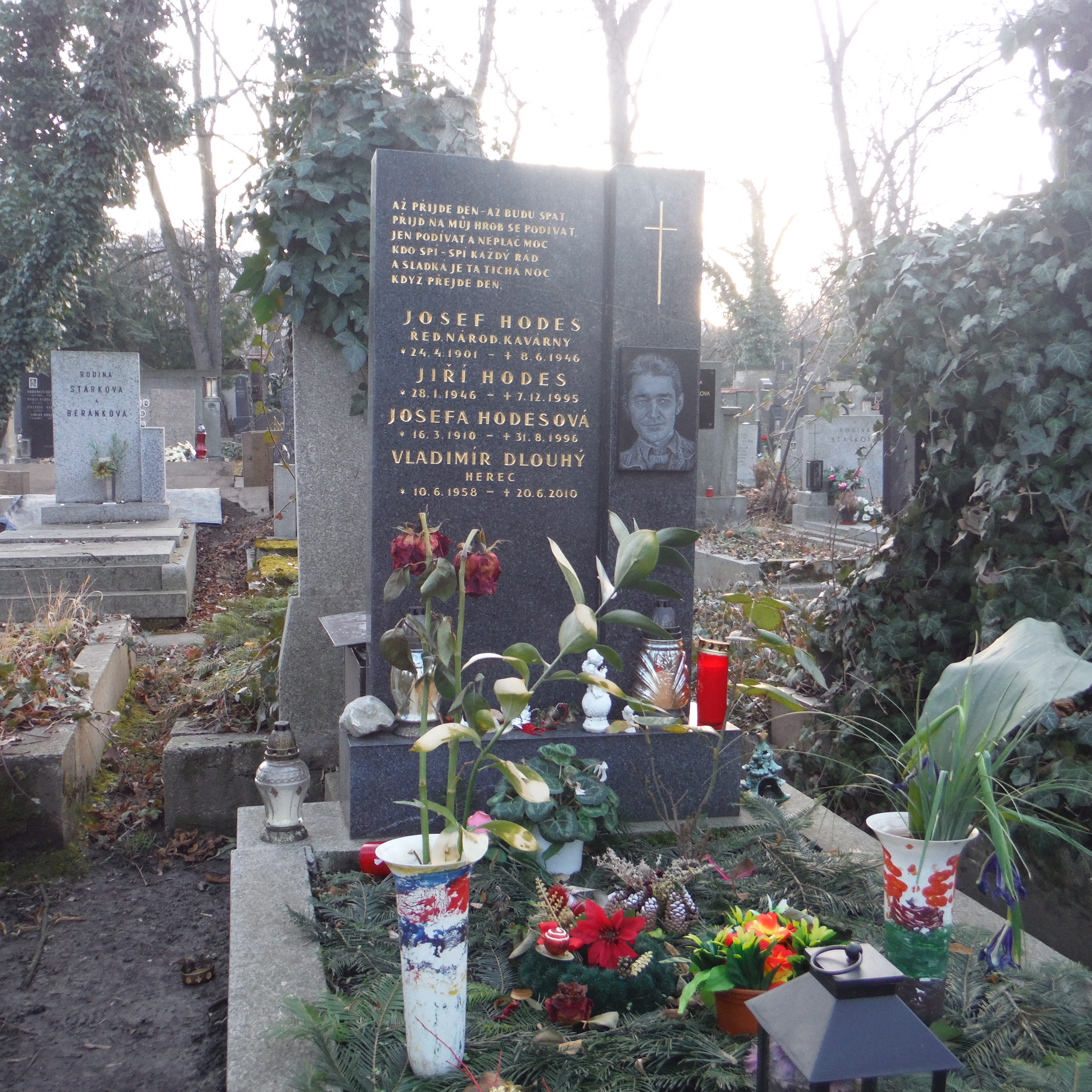
Actor's grave, located in the Olšany Cemetery

Vladimír Dlouhý (10 June 1958 – 20 June 2010) was a Czech theater, film and dubbing actor.

== Selected filmography ==
- Kajínek (2010)
- Guard No. 47 (2008)
- The Conception of My Younger Brother (2000)
- Buttoners (1997)
- Give the Devil His Due (1985)
- Arabela (1980) (TV series)

== Awards ==
- Czech Lion for best supporting actor (2008)
- Czech Lion for best supporting actor (2010)

== Personal life ==
His younger brother Michal is also an actor. Their paternal half-brother is Oliver Dlouhý.

He died on 20 June 2010 after a long struggle with cancer. He was 52.
