= Děcko =

2025 Czech drama TV series

- Genre: Drama
- Written by: Kateřina Krobová, Lucie Macháčková
- Directed by: Rozálie Kohoutová, Radim Špaček
- Starring: Judit Pecháček; Ondřej Malý; Elizaveta Maximová; Jan Jankovský; Magdalena Čečo; Adam Kocúr; Daniel Krejčík
- Country of origin: Czech Republic
- Original language: Czech
- No. of seasons: 1
- No. of episodes: 10

Production
- Running time: 49-60 minutes

Original release
- Network: ČT1
- Release: January 17 – March 21, 2025

Děcko (English: The Kiddo) is a Czech family drama series directed by Rozália Kohoutová and Radim Špaček. Story was written by Kateřina Krobová and Lucie Macháčková. It is broadcast by Czech Television in the spring of 2025.

== Synopsis ==
Single mother Klára is pregnant for the third time. Manipulative while ex-husband Adam wants to sue her for custody over younger son Daník. Older daughter Zorka needs her mother even more the more she runs away from her. Under economic pressure, Klára decides to embark on a thin ice of direct adoption. Her fate gradually begins to intertwine with fates of four couples – with the divorcing Alice and Michal, same-sex registered couple Petr and Vladimír, the seemingly superficial influencers Beáta and Hubert, and older partners Hanka and Kryštof. All of them strive in different ways for the possibility of surrogate parenthood and carry their own fate while character of unorthodox social worker Jarmil Čáp connects them all and covers the topic of surrogate family care.

== Cast ==
- Judit Pecháček as Klára Vernerová
- Ondřej Malý as Jarmil Čáp
- Vanda Hybnerová as MUDr Sýkorová
- Eva Hacurová as Alice Krátká
- Patrik Děrgel as Michal Malásek
- Daniel Krejčík as Petr Novotný
- Andrej Polák as Vladimír Novotný
- Elizaveta Maximová as Beáta Schubert
- Jan Jankovský as Hubert Schubert
- Vladimír Polívka as Adam Verner
- Jiří Rendl as Richard Jahn
- Magdalena Čečo as Zora
- Adam Kocúr as Daník
- Jan Antonín Abrhám as Tadeáš Šmíd

== Episodes ==
| No. | Title | Directed by | Written by | Original release date | Czech viewers (millions) |
|---|---|---|---|---|---|
| 1 | "Episode 1" | Rozálie Kohoutová, Radim Špaček | Kateřina Krobová, Lucie Macháčková | January 17, 2025 | 0.869 |
| 2 | "Episode 2" | Rozálie Kohoutová, Radim Špaček | Kateřina Krobová, Lucie Macháčková | January 24, 2025 | 0.685 |
| 3 | "Episode 3" | Rozálie Kohoutová, Radim Špaček | Kateřina Krobová, Lucie Macháčková | January 31, 2025 | 0.661 |
| 4 | "Episode 4" | Rozálie Kohoutová, Radim Špaček | Kateřina Krobová, Lucie Macháčková | February 7, 2025 | 0.625 |
| 5 | "Episode 5" | Rozálie Kohoutová, Radim Špaček | Kateřina Krobová, Lucie Macháčková | February 14, 2025 | 0.596 |
| 6 | "Episode 6" | Rozálie Kohoutová, Radim Špaček | Kateřina Krobová, Lucie Macháčková | February 21, 2025 | 0.616 |
| 7 | "Episode 7" | Rozálie Kohoutová, Radim Špaček | Kateřina Krobová, Lucie Macháčková | February 28, 2025 | 0.574 |
| 8 | "Episode 8" | Rozálie Kohoutová, Radim Špaček | Kateřina Krobová, Lucie Macháčková | March 7, 2025 | 0.551 |
| 9 | "Episode 9" | Rozálie Kohoutová, Radim Špaček | Kateřina Krobová, Lucie Macháčková | March 14, 2025 | 0.643 |
| 10 | "Episode 10" | Rozálie Kohoutová, Radim Špaček | Kateřina Krobová, Lucie Macháčková | March 21, 2025 | 0.594 |
