= Film Fans Award (Czech Lion Awards) =

Czech film award

- Country: Czech Republic
- First award: 2013
- Currently held by: Do the Mæth
- Website: https://www.filmovaakademie.cz

Film Fans Award is an award given as part of Czech Lion Awards ceremony. It is given to the film that received highest number of votes from film fans.

== Winners ==
Year	English Name	Original Name	Director
2013	Burning Bush	Hořící keř	Agnieszka Holland
2014	Fair Play	Fair Play	Andrea Sedláčková
2015	The Snake Brothers	Kobry a užovky	Jan Prušinovský
2016	Anthropoid	Anthropoid	Sean Ellis
2017	Barefoot	Po strništi bos	Jan Svěrák
2018	Smiles of Sad Men	Úsměvy smutných mužů	Daniel Svátek
2019	Women on the Run	Ženy v běhu	Martin Horský
2020	Caught in the Net	V síti	Barbora Chalupová, Vít Klusák
2021	Zátopek	Zátopek	David Ondříček
2022	Nineties	Devadesátky	Peter Bebjak
2023	Restore Point	Bod obnovy	Robert Hloz
2024	Waves	Vlny	Jiří Mádl
2025	Do the Mæth	Na plech	Martin Pohl
