= Invincibles (film) =

- Directed by: Dan Pánek
- Written by: Dan Pánek; Martin Beinhauer
- Starring: Ivan Trojan; Hynek Čermák; Tomáš Havlínek; Natalia Germani; Lenka Vlasáková
- Cinematography: Jan Baset Střítežský
- Edited by: Vasilis Skalenakis; Olina Kaufmanová
- Music by: Jiří Hájek
- Distributed by: Falcon
- Release date: 20 November 2025 (Czech Republic)
- Running time: 118 minutes
- Country: Czech Republic
- Language: Czech
- Budget: 70 Million CZK
- Box office: 19,592,151 CZK

Invincibles (Czech: Neporazitelní) is a 2025 Czech sports drama film directed by Dan Pánek. The film's plot is inspired by 2019 World Para Ice Hockey Championships which was held in Ostrava.

The main roles were played by Ivan Trojan, Hynek Čermák and Tomáš Havlínek. Other roles were played by Vanda Hybnerová, Til Schweiger, Lenka Vlasáková, Natália Germáni, Jiří Lábus, Veronika Macková and Marek Holý.

On 23 September 2025, the official poster for the film was released with the motto: "You can lose in life, but you should never give up". The film's premiere took place in Ostrava on November 6, 2025 in the Gong auditorium. The film was released in Czech cinemas on 20 November 2025.

== Plot ==
The film tells the story of three men who find themselves in a difficult life situation. Coach Robert Krulich ends his career after losing his team. Owner of PR agency Petr Fišer appears successful on the outside, but is struggling with the breakdown of family relationships. Promising athlete Radim Musil is stabbed while defending an attacked man and remains in a wheelchair after the attack, which will fundamentally affect his future life. Despite the adversity, all three decide to continue and face new challenges.

== Cast ==
- Ivan Trojan as Robert „Bob“ Krulich
- Hynek Čermák as Petr Fišer
- Tomáš Havlínek as Radim Musil
- Lenka Vlasáková as Dana Fišerová
- Vanda Hybnerová as Bára Veisová
- Til Schweiger as Brian Sullivan, coach of american team
- Natalia Germani as Klára Gasková
- Jiří Lábus as Luděk Puška
- Veronika Macková as Adéla
- Marek Holý as Miroslav „Guma“ Nejedlý
- Jana Stryková as Lidunka
- Zdeněk Piškula as Marek
- Jana Pidrmanová as Monika
- Petr Lněnička as committee chairman
- Ladislav Hampl as Jára Kalous
- Ondřej Malý as Jelínek, director of stadium
- Rob Easley as a vet Doug Jones
- Jan Dlouhý as Patrik Fišer
- Jakub Steklý as Pavel, a PR specialist
- Radek Zelinka as Vavroušek
- Michal Vápenka as Vápno
- Lenka Krobotová as therapeutist Králová
- Ivana Kulhánková as committee member
- Vladimír Polák as security boss
- Markéta Tannerová as Radim's mother
- Dušan Hraňo as bankéř
- Iveta Austová as journalist
- Jakub Voráček as himself
- Patrik Eliáš as himself
- Jiří Šlégr as himself
- Libor Bouček as himself
- Robert Záruba as himself
