= Sugar Candy =

- Directed by: Pavel Jandourek
- Written by: Pavel Jandourek
- Starring: Tereza Ramba; Marek Adamczyk; Jiří Lábus; Jaroslav Plesl; Jiří Dvořák
- Distributed by: Bioscop
- Release date: 23 October 2025 (Czech Republic)
- Running time: 115 minutes
- Country: Czech Republic
- Language: Czech
- Budget: 45 Million CZK
- Box office: 10,421,460 CZK

Sugar Candy (Czech: Cukrkandl) is a 2025 Czech adventure children's film directed and written by Pavel Jandourek. The film was shot in Luhačovice (the main location was the local villa Kancnýřka), Hodonín, Úštěk, Zubrnice and also in Slovakia. The film takes place during the Austro-Hungarian Empire at the turn of the 19th and 20th centuries and combines elements of a fairy tale and historical drama.

The film stars Tereza Ramba, Marek Adamczyk, Jiří Dvořák, Jaroslav Plesl, Pavel Zedníček, Vica Kerekes and Jiří Lábus.

The film's world premiere took place on June 1, 2025 at the Zlín Film Festival. The premiere in Czech cinemas took place on October 23, 2025.

== Plot ==
A young doctor, Anička Jesenská (Tereza Ramba), arrives in the town of Medov because of a house with a greenhouse and a dental office that she inherited from her uncle. Her decision to devote herself to dental care was also driven by a personal experience from her childhood, when her mother died after an incompetent procedure by a village blacksmith. Although Anička wants to help children in particular, the locals initially avoid her due to superstitions associated with the old villa. The situation changes when she discovers the effects of an exotic herb that allows for painless procedures. However, her success runs into opposition from the established local dentist Druml, and a dispute breaks out between them, which also involves a group of children from the area.

== Cast ==
- Tereza Ramba as Anička Jesenská
- Marek Adamczyk as Karel Rézl
- Marek Ťapák as doctor Rézl
- Jiří Dvořák as factory owner Štorch
- Pavel Zedníček as mayor Kmoch
- Jaroslav Plesl as Lojza
- Vica Kerekes as teacher Pavlíková
- Maroš Kramár as dentist Druml
- Jiří Lábus as grandpa Planta
- Miroslav Sojka as Albín
- Theo Schaefer as Kuba
- Ondřej Süss as Vašek
- Daniel Dongres as Jarda
- Adriana Martincová as Ema
- Martin Myšička as Kolowrat
