= Czech Lion Award for Best Animated Film =

Film award

- Country: Czech Republic
- First award: 2020
- Currently held by: Tales from the Magic Garden
- Website: https://www.filmovaakademie.cz

Czech Lion Award for Best Animated Film is an award given to the best Czech animated film. It was established in 2020.

== Winners ==
Year	English Name	Original Name	Director
2020	A Colourful Dream	Barevný sen	Jan Balej
2021	Even Mice Belong in Heaven	Myši patří do nebe	Jan Bubeníček, Denisa Grimmová
2022	Suzie in the Garden	Zuza v zahradách	Lucie Šimková-Sunková
2023	Tony, Shelly and the Magic Light	Tonda, Slávka a kouzelné světlo	Filip Pošivač
2024	Living Large	Život k sežrání	Kristina Dufková
2025	Tales from the Magic Garden	Pohádky po babičce	David Súkup, Patrik Pašš, Leon Vidmar, Jean-Claude Rozec
