= Oktopus (TV series) =

- Genre: Crime
- Created by: Josef Viewegh
- Written by: Jan Pachl; Petr Hudský
- Directed by: Jan Pachl
- Starring: Miroslav Krobot, Marika Šoposká, Kryštof Hádek
- Country of origin: Czech Republic
- Original language: Czech
- No. of seasons: 2
- No. of episodes: 13

Production
- Cinematography: Marek Janda
- Running time: 60 minutes

Original release
- Network: ČT1
- Release: August 28 – November 20, 2023

Oktopus is a Czech crime television series. The series is inspired by the Tempus Department that specializes in investigating cold cases. It started broadcast on 28 August 2023, competing with season 5 of Kriminálka Anděl. The series went on to debut with 1,340,000 viewers for the first episode (including retroactive TV views).

On 31 January 2024 Director of the ČT1 program Milan Fridrich confirmed that series was renewed for second season.

The second season (consisting of 12 episodes) of the Oktopus tv-show was broadcast from September 2025.

== Plot ==
The series focuses on special department of Prague police called OKTOPUS (abbreviation for Oddělení kontroly termínově ohrožených případů útvaru S which means Department for the control of termination-endangered cases of unit S). Captain Dítě is the sole investigator of the department until he is assigned a backup - young policewoman Fáberová. Both Dítě and Fáberová are loners and each has a different view on how cases should be investigated.

== Cast ==
=== Main ===
- Miroslav Krobot as Captain Miroslav Dítě, investigator
  - Tomáš Bambušek as Miroslav Dítě (younger)
- Marika Šoposká as Captain Markéta Fáberová, investigator
- Kryštof Hádek as Colonel Alexej Schwarz, commander of Department
- Zuzana Stivínová as First Lieutenant Marie Dítětová, medical examiner and Dítě's estranged wife

=== Supporting ===
- Jaromír Hanzlík as Major Jindřich Plachta, former investigator
- Sara Venclovská as Lieutenant Dita Šťovíková, assistant
- Pavlína Mourková as JUDr. Jana Vránová, prosecutor
- Pavel Novotný as Fábera, Fáberová's father
- Lukáš Bech as Jiří Valnoha, archivist
- Lenka Andelová as Alena Pošová, buffet vendor
- Ivo Gogál as Jiří Bulhar, bookmaker
- Jiří Dvořák as Tomáš Hýka

=== Guest ===
- Zdeněk Hruška as Karel Beránek (episode 1)
- Monika Timková as dcera Jana Beránková (episode 1)
- Amelie Pokorná and Lucie Zedníčková as Dominika Kršáková (episode 1)
- Ondřej Malý and Radim Kalvoda as Petr Poul (episode 1)
- Miloslav Potiška as Leoš Mohyla (episode 1)
- Natálie Řehořová as Jitka Mohylová (episode 1)
- Terezie Kovalová as Lena Žalec (episode 2)
- Jiří Panzner as Jan Kaiser (episode 2)
- Jiří Wohanka as Jan Heller (episode 2)
- Martin Myšička as gallerist Martin Branald (episode 2)
- Miloslav König as František Jiskra (episode 2)

== Production ==
Shooting started in September 2022. Emmaus area near Charles Square, where the Institute for Planning the Development of the Capital City of Prague is located, was used as background of the headquarters of the Prague police and of the Oktopus unit. During the several months of filming, the crew also uses a number of locations across the Czech Republic. Shooting was scheduled to conclude in February 2023. On 26 July 2023 it was announced that the series will start to air on 28 August 2023.

== Episodes ==
No.	Title	Directed by	Written by	Original release date	Czech viewers (millions)
1	"Ztracený případ"	Jan Pachl	Jan Pachl	August 28, 2023	1.214
During the investigation of the murder of a loan shark Karel Beránek a case of robbed post office is opened. Captain Dítě manages to connect both cases and eventually convict the murderer just before the statute of limitations expires.
2	"Falza"	Jan Pachl	Jan Pachl	September 4, 2023	0.986
A gruesome discovery in the Prague sewer opens a case linked to artistic elite.
3	"Škaredá středa"	Jan Pachl	Unknown	September 11, 2023	1.038
A random DNA sample helps crack twelve-year-old case of a girl run over by a train. Traces lead to dealers of stolen goods in Žižkov and also to a Prague rugby club.
4	"Syndikát koně"	Jan Pachl	Unknown	September 18, 2023	1.017
While Fáberová wants to get rid case out of the way as quickly as possible but Dítě is in no rush. Case linked horse racing allows him to devote himself to his passion for betting even while doing his job.
5	"Nikita"	Jan Pachl	Unknown	September 25, 2023	1.046
Cases of robbed truck drivers running naked on roadways might seem funny, but only until one of them loses his life.
6	"Srdcová sedma"	Jan Pachl	Unknown	October 2, 2023	0.972
In a luxury Karlovy Vary hotel, a finger is found in a soup while chef's corpse is in the trash can. The main suspect in the cold case suddenly appears in Prague.
7	"Dobrý pastýř"	Jan Pachl	Unknown	October 9, 2023	1.029
The murder of the tutor from a Youth detention center is a closed case as the murderer confessed and is placed behind bars, but Dítě and Fáberová are suspicious that there might be more to it than meets the eye.
8	"Žihadla"	Jan Pachl	Unknown	October 16, 2023	1.058
Major Plachta comes up with a case in a nursing home and immediately starts investigating. Only when he himself almost loses his life, Fáberová and Dítě begin to take him seriously.
9	"Kobyla"	Jan Pachl	Unknown	October 23, 2023	1.080
Five years after unsolved murders of young women, the perpetrator seeks attention with another crime. Dítě and Fáberová take on the case that takes them deep into the past.
10	"Psina"	Jan Pachl	Unknown	October 30, 2023	1.089
Case linked to Breeders of dogs.
11	"Deny"	Jan Pachl	Unknown	November 6, 2023	1.117
A talented young singer, Denisa had a promising career ahead, but she disappeared in Australia. Her body is suddenly found. Who is the killer? And who sends letters from Australia by her name?
12	"Bankocetle"	Jan Pachl	Unknown	November 13, 2023	1.143
Train robbery of discarded bags of fifty crowns seems to lack any meaning. Recently, a number of unique banknotes have appeared among collectors allowing to open an old case.
13	"Jordán"	Jan Pachl	Unknown	November 20, 2023	1.034
For thirty years, Captain Dítě has been haunted by a skeleton in the closet - Jordán case. He was once so naive that he promised the mother of a missing girl that he will solve the case.

== See also ==
- Cold Squad
- Cold Case
