= Czech Lion Award for Best Film =

Czech film award

- Country: Czech Republic
- First award: 1993
- Currently held by: Caravan
- Website: https://www.filmovaakademie.cz

Czech Lion Award for Best Film is one of the awards given to the best Czech motion picture.

== Winners ==
Year	English Name	Original Name	Director
1993	Big Beat	Šakalí léta	Jan Hřebejk
1994	Thanks for Every New Morning	Díky za každé nové ráno	Milan Šteindler
1995	The Garden	Záhrada	Martin Šulík
1996	Kolya	Kolja	Jan Svěrák
1997	Buttoners	Knoflíkáři	Petr Zelenka
1998	Sekal Has to Die	Je třeba zabít Sekala	Vladimír Michálek
1999	The Idiot Returns	Návrat idiota	Saša Gedeon
2000	Divided We Fall	Musíme si pomáhat	Jan Hřebejk
2001	Little Otik	Otesánek	Jan Švankmajer
2002	Year of the Devil	Rok ďábla	Petr Zelenka
2003	Boredom in Brno	Nuda v Brně	Vladimír Morávek
2004	Up and Down	Horem pádem	Jan Hřebejk
2005	Something Like Happiness	Štěstí	Bohdan Sláma
2006	I Served the King of England	Obsluhoval jsem anglického krále	Jiří Menzel
2007	Little Girl Blue	Tajnosti	Alice Nellis
2008	The Karamazov Brothers	Karamazovi	Petr Zelenka
2009	Protector	Protektor	Marek Najbrt
2010	Walking Too Fast	Pouta	Radim Špaček
2011	Flower Buds	Poupata	Zdeněk Jiráský
2012	In the Shadow	Ve stínu	David Ondříček
2013	Burning Bush	Hořící keř	Agnieszka Holland
2014	The Way Out	Cesta ven	Petr Václav
2015	The Snake Brothers	Kobry a užovky	Jan Prušinovský
2016	A Prominent Patient	Masaryk	Julius Ševčík
2017	Ice Mother	Bába z ledu	Bohdan Sláma
2018	Winter Flies	Všechno bude	Olmo Omerzu
2019	The Painted Bird	Nabarvené ptáče	Václav Marhoul
2020	Charlatan	Šarlatán	Agnieszka Holland
2021	Zátopek	Zátopek	David Ondříček
2022	Il Boemo	Il Boemo	Petr Václav
2023	Brothers	Bratři	Tomáš Mašín
2024	Waves	Vlny	Jiří Mádl
2025	Caravan	Karavan	Zuzana Kirchnerová-Špidlová
