= Miroslav Donutil =

Moravian actor

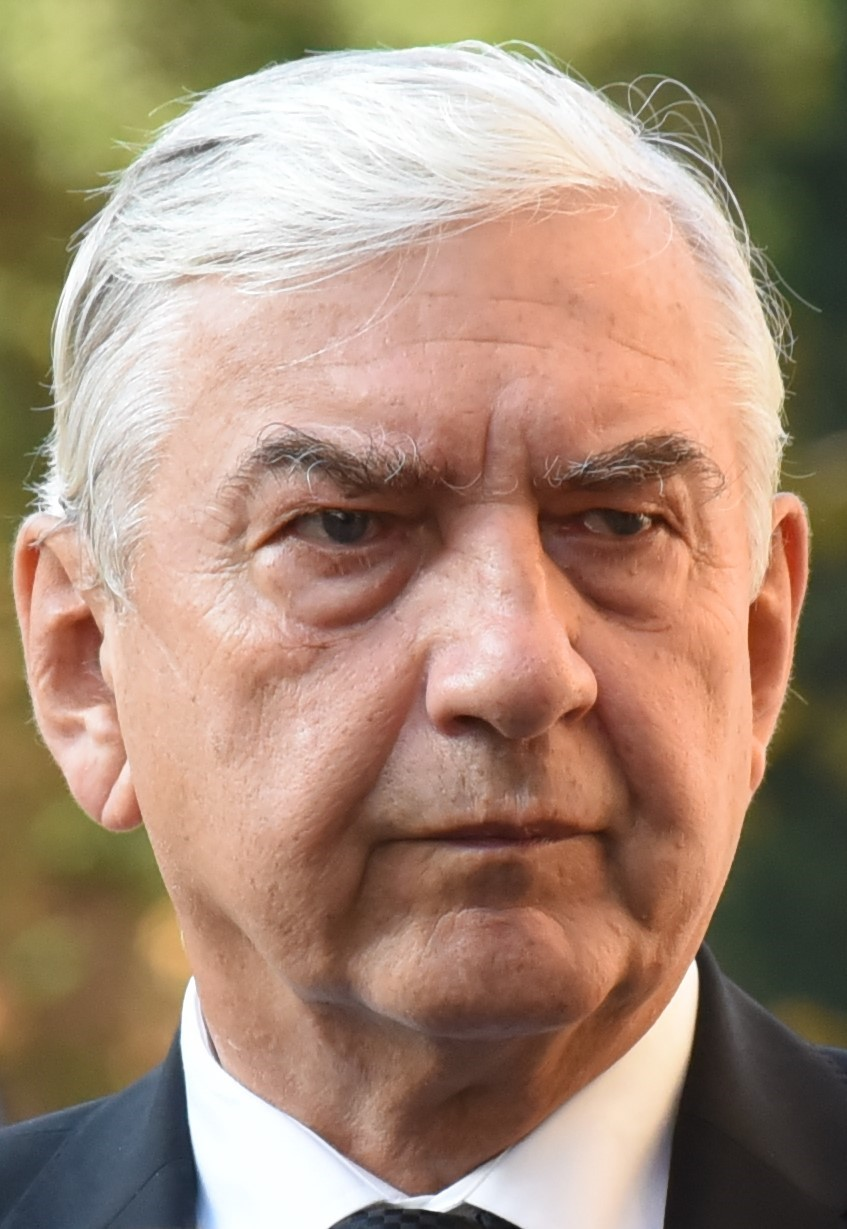
- Miroslav Donutil in 2019
- Born: 7 February 1951 (age 75); Třebíč, Czechoslovakia (now Czech Republic)
- Occupation: Actor
- Years active: 1972–present
- Spouse: Zuzana Donutilová (m. 1977)

Miroslav Donutil (born 7 February 1951) is a Czech theatrical, film and television actor, born in Třebíč. Since 1978 when he appeared as Hloch in Čistá řeka, Donutil has been making film and TV appearances. He dubbed the voice of Kevin Costner and Gérard Depardieu.

== Career ==
=== Beginnings ===
Donutil was born in Třebíč in 1951. He grew up in Brno. His parents were enthusiastic amateur actors, and he had an inclination for theatre from an early age. He studied at the Janáček Academy of Music and Performing Arts (in Czech: JAMU). During his studies he already appeared in the Brno theatre Husa na provázku, where he was engaged after he graduated at JAMU in 1973. Donutil collaborated with directors Petr Scherhaufer, Eva Tálská and Zdeněk Pospíšil, and performed in approximately 50 plays in Husa na provázku.

=== Screen career ===
In 1990 he became a member of the dramatic ensemble of the National Theatre in Prague. Since 1978 he began to deal with film, and his first promising role was Nikola Šuhaj in Balada pro banditu (1978). He broke through in film at the beginning of 1990s and since that time he gradually built up his position on the Czech film scene. In 1996 and 1997 he was awarded two TýTý television awards. Donutil received a Czech Lion award for his supporting role in the 1998 film Traps. Other films he has acted in include Tankový prapor, Černí baroni, The Inheritance or Fuckoffguysgoodday, Cosy Dens, Želary and Román pro ženy.

In 2013 he left his position as a permanent member of the National Theatre after 22 years, a decision he described as a long time in the making. In February 2019 a bronze bust of Donutil by academic sculptor Sebastian Wojnar was unveiled at the theatre in his birthplace of Třebíč.
