= Studna =

- Genre: Crime, Drama
- Written by: Miro Šifra, Kristina Májová
- Directed by: Tereza Kopáčová
- Starring: David Švehlík; Johana Matoušková; Filip František Červenka
- Country of origin: Czech Republic
- Original language: Czech
- No. of seasons: 1
- No. of episodes: 6

Production
- Running time: 55 Minutes

Original release
- Network: Voyo
- Release: 10 January – 14 February 2025

Studna (The Well) is a Czech crime drama series. It is based on a 1968 tragedy that occurred in Vonoklasy. It started with a fire in a family house while trees in the garden were cut. Stanislav Jelínek was found dead in a well while the body of his wife was found after the fire was extinguished. The couple's adult son was found nearby injured and in shock. Investigators at the time closed the case, stating that the perpetrator was the man in the well. The event served as an inspiration for an episode of Thirty Cases of Major Zeman of the same name.

== Plot ==
The series chronicles 5 decades of Jelínek family showing events before and after the tragedy. Story starts in 1932 when Stanislav Jelínek meets his future wife Marie. They eventually get married, build a house and have a son. Together they get through various obstacles until 1968...

== Cast ==
- David Švehlík as Stanislav Jelínek
- Johana Matoušková as Marie Jelínková
- Filip František Červenka as Slávek Jelínek
  - Jáchym Brabec, Jakub Jenčík as Slávek during childhood
- Marián Mitaš as Grombár
- Hana Vagnerová as Grombárová
- Jakub Prachař as Lojza Šimek
- Alena Doláková as Šimková
- Kristýna Ryška as Lidka
- Simona Lewandowska as Klára
- Tadeas Moravec as Matej

== Production ==
Shooting took place from February 2024 to June 2024. The exterior locations were filmed in Lochovice (the village, houses of Máňa and Standa and their neighbors, the cemetery), in Halouny at the U zrzavého paviána inn or in Třebíz (semi-trailer). The staff also visited the Prague hospital or the Koh-I-Noor building (research institute).

== Release ==
The series was released on streaming service Voyo. First episode premiered on 10 January 2025. The series was previously presented at Serial Killer Festival.

== Episodes ==
Episode	Directed by	Written by	Original air date (Voyo)	Original air date (Nova)	Czech viewers (millions)
1	Tereza Kopáčová	Miro Šifra, Kristina Májová	10 January 2025	TBA	
2	Tereza Kopáčová	Miro Šifra, Kristina Májová	17 January 2025	TBA	
3	Tereza Kopáčová	Miro Šifra, Kristina Májová	24 January 2025	TBA	
4	Tereza Kopáčová	Miro Šifra, Kristina Májová	31 January 2025	TBA	
5	Tereza Kopáčová	Miro Šifra, Kristina Májová	7 February 2025	TBA	
6	Tereza Kopáčová	Miro Šifra, Kristina Májová	14 February 2025	TBA	
