= Czech Lion Award for Best Director =

Czech film award

- Country: Czech Republic
- First award: 1993
- Currently held by: Katarína Gramatová (Promise, I'll Be Fine)
- Website: https://www.filmovaakademie.cz

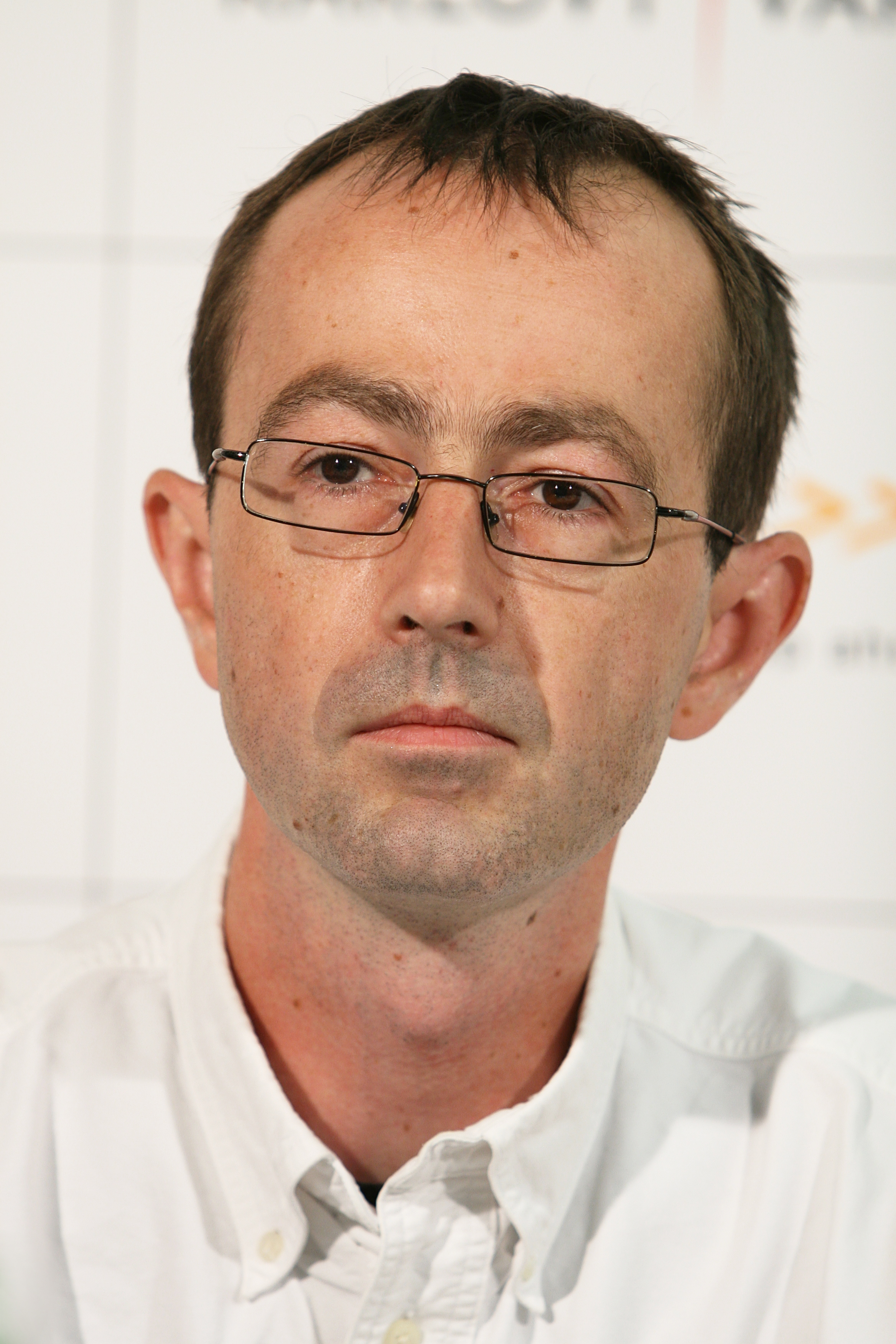
Petr Zelenka at the 43rd Karlovy Vary International Film Festival

Czech Lion Award for Best Director is an annual award given to the best Czech film director of the year.

== Winners ==
Year	Director	Film title (English)	Film title (Original)
1993	Jan Hřebejk (1)	Big Beat	Šakalí léta
1994	Milan Šteindler (1)	Thanks for Every New Morning	Díky za každé nové ráno
1995	Martin Šulík (1)	The Garden	Záhrada
1996	Jan Svěrák (1)	Kolya	Kolja
1997	Petr Zelenka (1)	Buttoners	Knoflíkáři
1998	Vladimír Michálek (1)	Sekal Has to Die	Je třeba zabít Sekala
1999	Saša Gedeon (1)	The Idiot Returns	Návrat idiota
2000	Jan Hřebejk (2)	Divided We Fall	Musíme si pomáhat
2001	Jan Svěrák (2)	Dark Blue World	Tmavomodrý svět
2002	Petr Zelenka (2)	Year of the Devil	Rok ďábla
2003	Vladimír Morávek (1)	Boredom in Brno	Nuda v Brně
2004	Jan Hřebejk (3)	Up and Down	Horem pádem
2005	Bohdan Sláma (1)	Something Like Happiness	Štěstí
2006	Jiří Menzel (1)	I Served the King of England	Obsluhoval jsem anglického krále
2007	Jan Svěrák (3)	Empties	Vratné lahve
2008	Petr Zelenka (3)	The Karamazov Brothers	Karamazovi
2009	Marek Najbrt (1)	Protector	Protektor
2010	Radim Špaček (1)	Walking Too Fast	Pouta
2011	Zdeněk Jiráský (1)	Flower Buds	Poupata
2012	David Ondříček (1)	In the Shadow	Ve stínu
2013	Agnieszka Holland (1)	Burning Bush	Hořící keř
2014	Petr Václav (1)	The Way Out	Cesta ven
2015	Jan Prušinovský (1)	The Snake Brothers	Kobry a užovky
2016	Julius Ševčík (1)	A Prominent Patient	Masaryk
2017	Bohdan Sláma (2)	Ice Mother	Bába z ledu
2018	Olmo Omerzu (1)	Winter Flies	Všechno bude
2019	Václav Marhoul (1)	The Painted Bird	Nabarvené ptáče
2020	Agnieszka Holland (2)	Charlatan	Šarlatán
2021	David Ondříček (2)	Zátopek	Zátopek
2022	Petr Václav (2)	Il Boemo	Il Boemo
2023	Tomáš Pavlíček (1); Jan Vejnar (1)	She Came at Night	Přišla v noci
2024	Jiří Mádl (1)	Waves	Vlny
2025	Katarína Gramatová (1)	Promise, I'll Be Fine	Nahoře nebe, v dolině já
