= Czech Lion Award for Best Music =

Film award category

- Country: Czech Republic
- First award: 1993
- Currently held by: Jonatan Pastirčák, Ondřej Mikula
- Website: filmovaakademie.cz

Czech Lion Award for Best Film is award given to the Czech film with best soundtrack.

== Winners ==
Year	English Name	Original Name	Composer
1993	Big Beat	Šakalí léta	Ivan Hlas
1994	The Ride	Jízda	Radek Pastrňák
1995	The Golet in the Valley	Golet v údolí	Luboš Fišer
1996	King Ubu	Král Ubu	Luboš Fišer
1997	An Ambiguous Report About the End of the World	Nejasná zpráva o konci světa	Jan Jirásek, Ondřej Soukup
1998	Sekal Has to Die	Je třeba zabít Sekala	Michal Lorenc
1999	Idiot Returns	Návrat idiota	Vladimír Godár
2000	Wild Flowers	Kytice	Jan Jirásek
2001	Dark Blue World	Tmavomodrý svět	Ondřej Soukup
2002	Year of the Devil	Rok ďábla	Jaromír Nohavica, Karel Holas
2003	One Hand Can't Clap	Jedna ruka netleská	Jan P. Muchow
2004	King of Thieves	Král zlodějů	Michael Kocáb
2005	The City of the Sun	Sluneční stát	Vladimír Godár
2006	Grandhotel	Grandhotel	Jan P. Muchow
2007	La Vie en rose	Edith Piaf	Becky Bentham, Edouard Dubois, Christopher Gunning
2008	Tobruk	Tobruk	Richard Horowitz, Sussan Deyhim
2009	Protector	Protektor	Midi lidi
2010	Kooky	Kuky se vrací	Michal Novinski
2011	Alois Nebel	Alois Nebel	Petr Kružík, Ondřej Ježek
2012	In the Shadow	Ve stínu	Jan P. Muchow, Michal Novinski
2013	Burning Bush	Hořící keř	Antoni Komasa-Lazarkiewicz
2014	Krásno	Krásno	Jan P. Muchow
2015	Schmitke	Schmitke	Johannes Repka
2016	A Prominent Patient	Masaryk	Michal Lorenc, Kryštof Marek
2017	Little Crusader	Křižáček	Irena Havlová a Vojtěch Havel
2018	The Hastrman	Hastrman	Petr Wajsar
2019	Watchmaker's Apprentice	Hodinářův učeň	Ivan Acher, Michal Novinski
2020	Shadow Country	Krajina ve stínu	Jakub Kudláč
2021	Occupation	Okupace	La Petite Sonja, Hank J. Manchini
2022	Arved	Arvéd	Ondřej Mikula (Aid Kid), Jonatán Pjoni Pastirčák
2023	Waltzing Matilda	Tancuj Matyldo	Michal Pavlíček
2024	Living Large	Život k sežrání	Michal Novinski
2025	Broken Voices	Sbormistr	Jonatan Pastirčák, Ondřej Mikula
