= Czech Lion Award for Best Sound =

Film award category

- Country: Czech Republic
- First award: 1994
- Currently held by: Juraj Mravec, Petr Čechák
- Website: https://www.filmovaakademie.cz

Czech Lion Award for Best Sound is award given to the Czech film with best Sound.

== Winners ==
Year	English Name	Original Name	Person
1994	Faust	Lekce Faust	Ivo Špalj
1995	The Dance Teacher	Učitel tance	Václav Hála, Ivo Špalj
1996	Forgotten Light	Zapomenuté světlo	Radim Hladík ml.
1997	An Ambiguous Report About the End of the World	Nejasná zpráva o konci světa	Michal Hloudek
1998	Sekal Has to Die	Je třeba zabít Sekala	Radim Hladík ml.
1999	Eliška Likes it Wild	Eliška má ráda divočinu	Radim Hladík ml., Ivo Špalj, Radek Rondevald
2000	Wild Flowers	Kytice	Jiří Klenka
2001	Rebels	Rebelové	Otto Chlpek, Radim Hladík ml.
2002	Year of the Devil	Rok ďábla	Michal Holubec
2003	Želary	Želary	Jiří Klenka
2004	King of Thieves	Král zlodějů	Zdeněk Taubler
2005	Wrong Side Up	Příběhy obyčejného šílenství	Michal Holubec
2006	Grandhotel	Grandhotel	Pavel Rejholec, Jakub Čech
2007	La Vie en rose	Edith Piaf	Laurent Zeilig
2008	Tobruk	Tobruk	Pavel Rejholec, Jakub Čech
2009	3 Seasons in Hell	3 sezóny v pekle	Pavel Rejholec, Jakub Čech
2010	Kooky	Kuky se vrací	Jakub Čech, Juraj Mravec a Pavel Rejholec
2011	Alois Nebel	Alois Nebel	Viktor Ekrt, Ondřej Ježek
2012	In the Shadow	Ve stínu	Pavel Rejholec, Jakub Čech
2013	Burning Bush	Hořící keř	Petr Čechák, Marek Hart
2014	The Way Out	Cesta ven	Daniel Němec, Ivan Horák
2015	Schmitke	Schmitke	Cristoph Chevallerie
2016	A Prominent Patient	Masaryk	Viktor Ekrt, Pavel Rejholec
2017	Barefoot	Po strništ bos	Jakub Čech, Claus Lynge
2018	Domestique	Domestik	Jan Šulcek, Jakub Jurásek, David Titěra
2019	The Painted Bird	Nabarvené ptáče	Pavel Rejholec
2020	Charlatan	Šarlatán	Radim Hladík jr.
2021	Zátopek	Zátopek	Pavel Rejholec, Jakub Čech
2022	Il Boemo	Il Boemo	Daniel Němec, Francesco Liotard
2023	Restore Point	Bod Obnovy	Lukáš Ujčík, Samuel Jurkovič, Jan Šulcek
2024	Waves	Vlny	Viktor Ekrt
2025	Broken Voices	Sbormistr	Juraj Mravec, Petr Čechák
