= Petr Zelenka (director) =

Czech playwright and film director (born 1967)

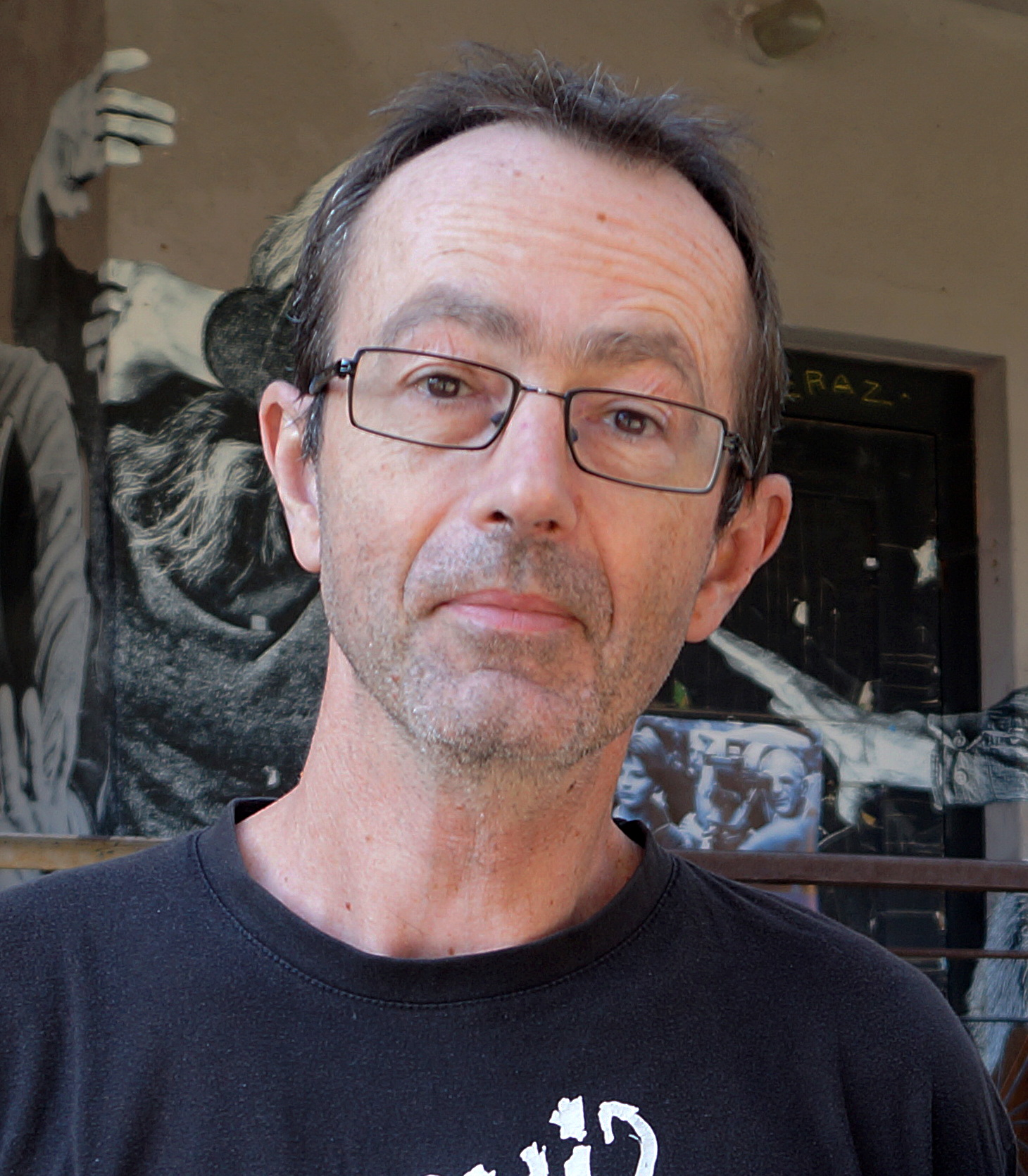
Petr Zelenka (2018)

Petr Zelenka (born 21 August 1967 in Prague, Czechoslovakia) is a Czech playwright and director of theatre and film. His films have been recognized at international festivals in Moscow and Rotterdam. In 2008, his film Karamazovi was the Czech Republic's official Oscar submission for Best Foreign Language Film.

== Career ==
An early notable work is a black comedy, Tales of Common Insanity (2004) (Czech: Příběhy obyčejného šílenství), which he directed at Dejvické divadlo. He received the Alfréd Radok Award for Best Play. The play was later staged in other Czech theatres as well as in Poland, Hungary, Slovakia, Slovenia and Germany. It was also published in English and translated to Russian. For his film Mnâga – Happy End he won the 1996 Findling Award at the Filmfestival Cottbus.

In 2005, Zelenka adapted the comedy as a film, released as Wrong Side Up, which won two movie festival awards in 2006 and was nominated for six other awards. His second most notable play is Teremin, inspired by the life of Russian inventor Léon Theremin.

His 2008 film, Karamazovi, was the Czech Republic's official Oscar submission for Best Foreign Language Film.

His 2010 election advertisement "Přemluv bábu a dědu" caused controversy as critics believed it was offensive against elder people and "an imperfect copy of Sarah Silverman's stand-up video."

== Filmography ==
Year	Title	Role	Notes
1993	Visací zámek 1982 - 2007	screenplay and direction	Television film
1996	Mňága – Happy End	screenplay and direction	won several awards at the film festivals in Cottbus (Findling Award), Plzeň and České Budějovice
1997	Buttoners	Screenplay and direction	Winner of a Tiger award at the Rotterdam IFF
2000	Erotic Tales: Powers	Screenplay and direction	
2000	Loners	Co-author of screenplay	
2002	Year of the Devil	Screenplay and direction	FIPRESCI Prize at the Cottbus IFF, six Czech Lion Awards including Best film and Best director, Prize Trieste at Trieste film festival
2005	Wrong Side Up	Screenplay and direction	Received the Critics Award at the 27th Moscow International Film Festival and the Don Quixote Award at Cottbus
2008	Karamazovi	Screenplay and direction	
2015	Lost in Munich	Screenplay and direction	
2020	Droneman	Screenplay and direction	
