= Czech Lion Award for Best Supporting Actress =

Film award category

- Country: Czech Republic
- First award: 1994
- Currently held by: Juliána Brutovská (Caravan)
- Website: https://www.filmovaakademie.cz

Czech Lion Award for Best Supporting Actress is an annual award given to the best female actress in a supporting role of a Czech film.

== Winners ==
Year	Actor	Film title (English)	Film title (Original)
1994	Jana Preissová (1)	The Order	Řád
1995	Tereza Brodská (1)	Revenge	Má je pomsta
1996	Veronika Žilková (1)	Forgotten Light	Zapomenuté světlo
1997	Klára Issová (1)	An Ambiguous Report About the End of the World	Nejasná zpráva o konci světa
1998	Agnieszka Sitek (1)	Sekal Has to Die	Je třeba zabít Sekala
1999	Anna Geislerová (1)	The Idiot Returns	Návrat idiota
2000	Eva Holubová (1)	Ene bene	Ene bene
2001	Zuzana Kronerová (1)	The Wild Bees	Divoké včely
2002	Jana Hubinská (1)	Girlie	Děvčátko
2003	Vilma Cibulková (1)	Pupendo	Pupendo
2004	Klára Melíšková (1)	Champions	Mistři
2005	Anna Geislerová (2)	Something Like Happiness	Štěstí
2006	Jana Brejchová (1)	Beauty in Trouble	Kráska v nesnázích
2007	Zuzana Bydžovská (1)	Gympl	Gympl
2008	Lenka Termerová (1)	Night Owls	Děti noci
2009	Daniela Kovářová (1)	Kawasaki's Rose	Kawasakiho růže
2010	Eliška Balzerová (1)	Women in Temptation	Ženy v pokušení
2011	Taťjana Medvecká (1)	The House	Dům
2012	Klára Melíšková (2)	Four Suns	Čtyři slunce
2013	Jaroslava Pokorná (1)	The Burning Bush	Hořící keř
2014	Lenka Krobotová (1)	Nowhere in Moravia	Díra u Hanušovic
2015	Lucie Žáčková (1)	Snake Brothers	Kobry a užovky
2016	Klára Melíšková (3)	I, Olga Hepnarová	Já, Olga Hepnarová
2017	Petra Špalková (1)	Ice Mother	Bába z ledu
2018	Eliška Křenková (1)	Winter Flies	Všechno bude
2019	Klára Melíšková (4)	Owners	Vlastníci
2020	Petra Špalková (2)	Shadow Country	Krajina ve stínu
2021	Antonie Formanová	Occupation	Okupace
2022	Martha Issová (1)	Buko	Buko
2023	Milena Steinmasslová (1)	The Exhale	Němá tajemství
2024	Tatiana Pauhofová (1)	Waves	Vlny
2025	Juliána Brutovská (1)	Caravan	Karavan
