= Buttoners =

- Directed by: Petr Zelenka
- Starring: Pavel Zajíček; Jan Haubert
- Release date: 1997
- Running time: 102 minutes
- Country: Czech Republic
- Languages: Czech; English; Japanese

Buttoners (Czech: Knoflíkáři) is a 1997 Czech film directed by Petr Zelenka.

== Cast ==
- Pavel Zajíček - Presenter of Radio 1
- Jan Haubert - Guest of Radio 1
- Seisuke Tsukahara - Japanese man with Glasses
- Motohiro Hosoya - Japanese man with Beard
- Junzo Inokuchi - Young Japanese man

== Awards ==
Buttoners was awarded the 1997 Czech Lion for Best Film.

The Tiger award at the Rotterdam IFF, 1997
