= Czech Lion Award for Best Screenplay =

Film award category

- Country: Czech Republic
- First award: 1993
- Currently held by: Dužan Duong, Jan Smutný, Lukáš Kokeš
- Website: https://www.filmovaakademie.cz

Czech Lion Award for Best Screenplay is award given to the Czech film with best screenplay.

== Winners ==
Year	English Name	Original Name	Writer
1993	Helimadoe	Helimadoe	Václav Šašek
1994	Thanks for Every New Morning	Díky za každé nové ráno	Halina Pawlowská
1995	The Garden	Záhrada	Ondrej Šulaj, Marek Leščák, Martin Šulík
1996	Kolya	Kolja	Zdeněk Svěrák
1997	Buttoners	Knoflíkáři	Petr Zelenka
1998	Sekal Has to Die	Je třeba zabít Sekala	Jiří Křižan
1999	Idiot Returns	Návrat idiota	Saša Gedeon
2000	Divided We Fall	Musíme si pomáhat	Petr Jarchovský
2001	Autumn Spring	Babí léto	Jiří Hubač
2002	Some Secrets	Výlet	Alice Nellis
2003	Boredom in Brno	Nuda v Brně	Vladimír Morávek, Jan Budař
2004	Up and Down	Horem pádem	Petr Jarchovský
2005	Something Like Happiness	Štěstí	Bohdan Sláma
2006	Rules of Lies	Pravidla lži	Robert Sedláček
2007	Empties	Vratné lahve	Zdeněk Svěrák
2008	The Country Teacher	Venkovský učitel	Bohdan Sláma
2009	Protector	Protektor	Robert Geisler, Benjamin Tuček, Marek Najbrt
2010	Walking Too Fast	Pouta	Ondřej Štindl
2011	Leaving	Odcházení	Václav Havel
2012	In the Shadow	Ve stínu	Marek Epstein, David Ondříček, Misha Votruba
2013	Burning Bush	Hořící keř	Štěpán Hulík
2014	The Way Out	Cesta ven	Petr Václav
2015	Lost in Munich	Ztraceni v Mnichově	Petr Zelenka
2016	A Prominent Patient	Masaryk	Petr Kolečko, Alex Koenigsmark, Julius Ševčík
2017	Ice Mother	Bába z ledu	Bohdan Sláma
2018	Winter Flies	Všechno bude	Petr Pýcha
2019	Owners	Vlastníci	Jiří Havelka
2020	Shadow Country	Krajina ve stínu	Ivan Arsenjev
2021	Occupation	Okupace	Marek Šindelka, Vojtěch Mašek
2022	Arved	Arvéd	Jan Poláček, Vojtěch Mašek
2023	The Exhale	Němá tajemství	Alice Nellis
2024	Waves	Vlny	Jiří Mádl
2025	Summer School, 2001	Letní škola, 2001	Dužan Duong, Jan Smutný, Lukáš Kokeš
