= A Prominent Patient =

2016 Czech-Slovak drama film

- Film poster
- Directed by: Julius Ševčík
- Written by: Julius Ševčík
- Produced by: Rudolf Biermann; Julius Ševčík
- Starring: Karel Roden
- Cinematography: Martin Štrba
- Edited by: Marek Opatrný
- Music by: Kryštof Marek; Michał Lorenc
- Production companies: In Film Praha; Czech Television; Radio and Television of Slovakia; Arte
- Release dates: 25 December 2016 (Lucerna Kino); 9 March 2017 (Czech Republic)
- Running time: 113 minutes
- Countries: Czech Republic; Slovakia
- Languages: Czech; Slovak; English
- Budget: 54,000,000 CZK
- Box office: 41,746,040 CZK

A Prominent Patient (Czech: Masaryk) is a 2016 Czech-Slovak biographical drama film directed by Julius Ševčík. It was screened in the Berlinale Special section at the 67th Berlin International Film Festival. It won twelve Czech Lions including the Czech Lion for Best Film. The film was first screened in Lucerna Kino.

== Plot ==
The film is set from 1937 to 1939. It is loosely based on the life of Jan Masaryk when he was the Czechoslovak ambassador to the United Kingdom. The film starts with the death of the first Czechoslovak president and Jan's father Tomáš Garrigue Masaryk. Jan becomes Ambassador to the United Kingdom. Czechoslovakia faces aggression from Nazi Germany, which supports the Sudeten Germans. Masaryk tries to persuade the United Kingdom to help his homeland but the Munich Agreement is eventually settled and Czechoslovakia is forced to give up its borderlands to Germany. Jan Masaryk is devastated and leaves to the United States. He ends up in a sanatorium due to his psychological problems. He is treated by Doctor Stein. Their relationship is problematic because Stein is German. Masaryk is also helped by an American journalist, Marcia Davenport.

== Cast ==
- Karel Roden as Jan Masaryk
- Hanns Zischler as Dr. Stein
- Oldřich Kaiser as Edvard Beneš
- Arly Jover as Marcia Davenport
- Jiří Vyorálek as Konrad Henlein
- Emília Vášáryová as Blaženka
- Eva Herzigová as Madla
- Martin Hofmann as the President's Secretary
- Zuzana Kronerová as Alice Masaryková
- Jiří Ornest as Tomáš Garrigue Masaryk
- Ján Greššo as Milan Hodža
- Dermot Crowley as Lord Halifax
- Paul Nicholas as Neville Chamberlain
- Gina Bramhill as Lady Annie Higgins
- Stewart Moss as the bodyguard
- Joan Blackham as Mrs. Fitzgerald

== Production ==
Shooting consisted of two parts. In fall 2015, filming started in Slovakia and then moved to the Czech Republic in January 2016. Some scenes were also shot in the Netherlands. Shooting took 40 days overall. Scenes set in London were shot in Prague. There is a shot of the British parliament that was modeled from Czech realms by work of compositioners.

== Reception ==
=== Critical reception ===
A Prominent Patient has received generally mixed to positive reviews from critics. It holds 68% at Kinobox aggregator. The film won twelve Czech Lion Awards and eight Sun in a Net Awards. Masaryk's participation in the Sun in a Net Awards received attention due to its success at Czech Lions. The film received lukewarm reviews from critics at the Berlin International Film Festival. Critics criticised cheap sex scenes, aggravation of the film and confusing plot. They also criticised some supporting actors.

=== Accolades ===
Award	Category	Recipient(s)	Result	Ref(s)
Czech Lion Awards	Best Film	Rudolf Biermann, Julius Ševčík	Won	
Czech Lion Awards	Best Director	Julius Ševčík	Won	
Czech Lion Awards	Best Actor in Leading Role	Karel Roden	Won	
Czech Lion Awards	Best Supporting Actress	Arly Jover	Nominated	
Czech Lion Awards	Best Supporting Actor	Oldřich Kaiser	Won	
Czech Lion Awards	Best Screenplay	Petr Kolečko, Alex Koenigsmark, Julius Ševčík	Won	
Czech Lion Awards	Best Cinematography	Martin Štrba	Won	
Czech Lion Awards	Best Editing	Marek Opatrný	Won	
Czech Lion Awards	Best Sound	Viktor Ekrt, Pavel Rejholec	Won	
Czech Lion Awards	Best Music	Michal Lorenc, Kryštof Marek	Won	
Czech Lion Awards	Best Scenography	Milan Býček	Won	
Czech Lion Awards	Best Costumes	Katarína Štrbová Bieliková	Won	
Czech Lion Awards	Best Masks	Lukáš Král	Won	
Czech Lion Awards	Best Poster	Rudolf Biermann, Julius Ševčík	Nominated	
Sun in a Net Awards	Best Film	Julius Ševčík	Nominated	
Sun in a Net Awards	Best Director	Julius Ševčík	Nominated	
Sun in a Net Awards	Best Screenplay	Petr Kolečko, Alex Koenigsmark, Julius Ševčík	Nominated	
Sun in a Net Awards	Best Cinematography	Martin Štrba	Won	
Sun in a Net Awards	Best Editing	Marek Opatrný	Won	
Sun in a Net Awards	Best Sound	Viktor Ekrt, Pavel Rejholec	Won	
Sun in a Net Awards	Best Music	Michal Lorenc, Kryštof Marek	Nominated	
Sun in a Net Awards	Best Scenography	Milan Býček	Won	
Sun in a Net Awards	Best Director	Julius Ševčík	Won	
Sun in a Net Awards	Best Actor in Leading Role	Karel Roden	Won	
Sun in a Net Awards	Best Supporting Actor	Oldřich Kaiser	Won	
Sun in a Net Awards	Best Supporting Actress	Arly Jover	Nominated	
