= Czech Lion Awards =

Annual Czech film and television award

Czech Lion Awards Český lev
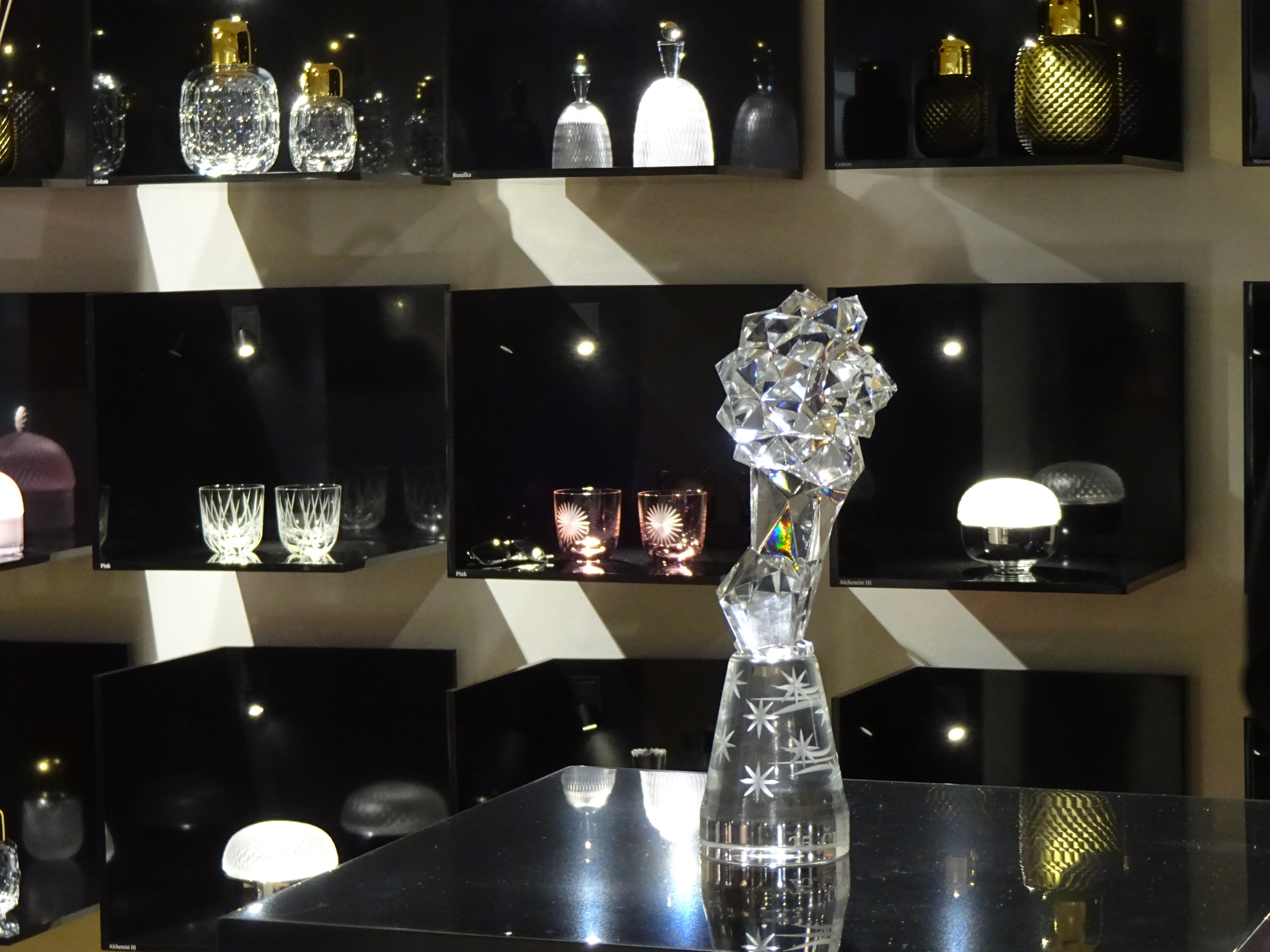
- Czech Lion trophy
- Awarded for: Excellence in cinematic achievements
- Country: Czech Republic
- Presented by: Czech Film and Television Academy (ČFTA)
- First award: 25 July 1994 (to honor achievements of 1993/4)
- Website: ceskylev.cz

The Czech Lion Awards (Czech: Český lev) are annual awards that recognize accomplishments in filmmaking and television. It is the highest award of achievement in film awarded in the Czech Republic. The jury is composed of members of the Czech Film and Television Academy (ČFTA).

Eligible films must have been released in the year prior to the awards ceremony.

== Categories ==
=== Main awards ===
- Best Film
- Best Director
- Best Screenplay
- Best Cinematography
- Best Editing
- Best Sound
- Best Music
- Best Actor in Leading Role
- Best Actress in Leading Role
- Best Supporting Actor
- Best Supporting Actress
- Unique Contribution to Czech Film
- Best TV Series
- Best Documentary
- Best Television Film or Miniseries
- Best Short Film
- Best Animated Film
- Best Costume Design
- Best Makeup and Hairstyling
- Best Stage Design

=== Special awards ===
- Best Film Poster
- Film Fans Award
- Best Student Film

== Czech Lion winners ==
=== Single films with most awards ===
Year	Film	Awards	Notes
2016	A Prominent Patient	12	Nominated in 13 categories.
2013	Burning Bush	11	Originally released as miniseries. Nominated in 14 categories.
1998	Sekal Has to Die	10	Record holder until 2013.
2012	In the Shadow	9	Nominated in 11 categories. Also won Film Critics' Award and Best Film Poster Award.
2019	The Painted Bird	9	Nominated in 11 categories. Also won Best Film Poster Award.
2021	Zátopek	8	Nominated in 13 categories. Also won Best Film Poster Award.
2008	The Karamazovs	8	
2005	Something Like Happiness	7	
2014	The Way Out	7	
2009	Protector	7	
1996	Kolya	6	
2002	Year of the Devil	6	
2015	The Snake Brothers	6	
2017	Ice Mother	6	
2020	Shadow Country	6	Nominated in 15 categories. Also won Best Film Poster Award.
2022	Il Boemo	6	Nominated in 11 categories.
1995	The Garden	5	
1999	The Idiot Returns	5	
2000	Divided We Fall	5	
2003	Boredom in Brno	5	
2010	Walking Too Fast	5	

=== Best actors and actresses ===
Actor	Awards won	Main Awards	Supporting Awards	Notes
Ivan Trojan	7	5	2	
Anna Geislerová	5	3	2	
Klára Melíšková	5	1	4	
Jiří Schmitzer	4	4	0	
Jan Budař	3	1	2	
Zuzana Bydžovská	3	2	1	
Petra Špalková	3	1	2	
Jiřina Bohdalová	2	2	0	
Iva Janžurová	2	2	0	
Jiří Lábus	2	2	0	
Bolek Polívka	2	2	0	
Karel Roden	2	2	0	
Tereza Brodská	2	1	1	
Vladimír Dlouhý	2	0	2	Supporting actor for Kajínek was awarded In Memoriam.
Jiří Kodet	2	0	2	
