= 2012 Czech Lion Awards =

Czech film award ceremony

20th Czech Lion Awards
- Date: February 3, 2013
- Site: Rudolfinum, Prague

Highlights
- Best Actor: Ivan Trojan; In the Shadow
- Best Actress: Gabriela Míčová; Garbage, the City and Death
- Best Supporting Actor: Ondřej Vetchý; Sunday League - Pepik Hnatek's Final Match
- Best Supporting Actress: Klára Melíšková; Four Suns
- Most awards: In the Shadow (9)
- Most nominations: Four Suns (12)

Television coverage
- Network: Česká televize
- Ratings: 616,000

2012 Czech Lion Awards ceremony was held on 3 February 2013.

== Winners and nominees ==
Best Film	Best Director
In the Shadow – Kryštof Mucha, David Ondříček, Ehud Bleiberg; Four Suns – Pavel Strnad, Petr Oukropec - (Negativ); Garbage, the City and Death – Čestmír Kopecký; Sunday League - Pepik Hnatek's Final Match – Poslední zápas Pepika Hnátka – Misu Predescu, Petr Erben; Polski film – Milan Kuchynka, Grzegorz Madej	In the Shadow – David Ondříček; Four Suns – Bohdan Sláma; Sunday League - Pepik Hnatek's Final Match – Jan Prušinovský; Garbage, the City and Death – Jan Hřebejk; Polski film – Marek Najbrt
Best Actor in a Leading Role	Best Actress in a Leading Role
In the Shadow – Ivan Trojan; Four Suns – Jaroslav Plesl; Sunday League - Pepik Hnatek's Final Match – Miroslav Krobot; Garbage, the City and Death – Martin Pechlát; 7 Days of Sins – Ondřej Vetchý	Garbage, the City and Death – Gabriela Míčová; Four Suns – Anna Geislerová; In the Shadow – Soňa Norisová; 7 Days of Sins – Vica Kerekes; Oldies But Goldies – Jiřina Bohdalová
Best Actor in a Supporting Role	Best Actress in a Supporting Role
Sunday League - Pepik Hnatek's Final Match – Ondřej Vetchý; To the Woods – Jiří Schmitzer; Four Suns – Karel Roden; Garbage, the City and Death – Martin Finger; In the Shadow – Sebastian Koch	Four Suns – Klára Melíšková; The Blue Tiger – Barbora Hrzánová; Polski film – Jana Plodková; Sunday League - Pepik Hnatek's Final Match – Pavla Beretová; Oldies But Goldies – Jiřina Jirásková
Best Screenplay	Best Documentary
In the Shadow – Marek Epstein, David Ondříček, Misha Votruba; Four Suns – Bohdan Sláma; Sunday League - Pepik Hnatek's Final Match – Jan Prušinovský; Garbage, the City and Death – Dušan D. Pařízek; Polski film – Marek Najbrt, Robert Geisler, Benjamin Tuček	Love in the Grave – David Vondráček; Private Universe – Helena Třeštíková; Věra 68 – Olga Sommerová; Two Nil – Pavel Abrahám; Váňa – Jakub Wagner
Best Cinematography	Best Editing
In the Shadow – Adam Sikora; The Confidant – Jan Malíř; Garbage, the City and Death – Martin Štrba, Lukáš Milota; 7 Days of Sins – Ján Ďuriš; Four Suns – Diviš Marek	In the Shadow – Michal Lánský; Four Suns – Jan Daňhel; Garbage, the City and Death – Vladimír Barák; Sunday League - Pepik Hnatek's Final Match – Poslední zápas Pepika Hnátka – Otakar Šenovský; Polski film – Pavel Hrdlička
Music	Sound
In the Shadow – Jan P. Muchow, Michal Novinski; Four Suns – Vypsaná fiXa; Polski film – Midi lidi; Garbage, the City and Death – Ivan Acher; Sunday League - Pepik Hnatek's Final Match – Vratislav Kydlíček, Jan P. Muchow	In the Shadow – Pavel Rejholec, Jakub Čech; Four Suns – Jan Čeněk; The Messenger – Radim Hladík ml.; Sunday League - Pepik Hnatek's Final Match – Michal Čech, Matěj Matuška; Polski film – Jakub Čech, Marek Hart, Tomáš Zůbek
Design	Unique Contribution to Czech Film
In the Shadow – Jan Vlasák, Jarmila Konečná, Lukáš Král; The Blue Tiger – Henrich Boráros, Juraj Horváth, Michal Struss; Garbage, the City and Death – Kamila Polívková, Milan Býček, Jonáš Janků – Cirqueon; Don't Stop – Katka Coufalíková, Lukáš Král, Jan Vlček; Four Suns – Zdeněk Klika, Zuzana Krejzková, Jan Vlasák	Karel Černý

=== Non-statutory Awards ===
Most Popular Film	Best Foreign Film
You Kiss like a Devil	The Intouchables
Film Critics' Award for Best Film	Film Critics' Award Best Documentary
In the Shadow	Love in the Grave
Best Film Poster	Magnesie Award for Best Student Film
Marius Corradini – In the Shadow	M.O.
