= Oddíl B =

- Genre: Comedy
- Written by: Petr Kolečko
- Directed by: Jan Prušinovský
- Starring: Tadeáš Moravec; Zdeněk Godla; Julius Oračko
- Music by: Ondřej Anděra
- Country of origin: Czech Republic
- Original language: Czech
- No. of seasons: 1
- No. of episodes: 10

Production
- Producers: Jan Prušinovský; Filip Brouk; Ondřej Zima
- Running time: 60 minutes
- Production company: Offside Men

Original release
- Network: Oneplay
- Release: October 9, 2026

Oddíl B (Section B) is a Czech comedy television series directed by Jan Prušinovský and written by Petr Kolečko. The series takes place in a prison environment and was filmed in the spring of 2025 in Jirkov, Chomutov and Nové Sedlo prison.

The series was produced by the production company Offside Men for Oneplay. The series was supported by the Ministry of the Environment of the Czech Republic, the Ústí nad Labem Region, European Union funds (EU Next Generation, National Recovery Plan) and the Ministry of Culture of the Czech Republic.

According to Petr Kolečko, the series loosely follows the Most! series in style, but is "several levels edgier" and is intended to offer "darker undertones".

== Plot ==
The series, set in the prison service, combines social commentary and comedy. The name "Section B" refers to the most crowded part of the prison, where criminals are placed for the least serious crimes. Young first-time convict David Broulík discovers how it is possible to smuggle a mobile phone into prison, make a vibrator out of a toothbrush, or a crossbow out of a hanger. And whether it is possible to maintain one's own dignity in the process.

== Cast ==
- Tadeáš Moravec as David Broulík, a young first-time convict
- Zdeněk Godla as Saša Kárvai, a recidivist and forger
- Julius Oračko as Marián Vjača, a drug addict and cellar robber
- Vlasta Kostečka as Pepa Gorol, a gentle arsonist
- Martin Gorol as pimp Mrázik
- Marsell Bendig as a notorious car thief
- Matěj Hádek as educator Jaromír Pruza
- Zuzana Stivínová as major Kamila Pruzová, head of prison guard
- Táňa Malíková as Kunčičková, a prison psychologist
- Adam Ernest as Kryštof Hulec, a prison guard
- Jan Jankovský as chief constable Mirek
- Václav Marhoul as prison warden Macík
- Nikolas Ferenc as Štefan Bekr, Moro's henchman
- František Balog as Ludvík Paločaj, cook and, Moro's henchman
- Kristýna Jedličková as Darja, David's girlfriend
- Viktor Tauš as David's lawyer

== Episodes ==
Episode		Directed by	Written by	Original air date (Voyo)	Original air date (Nova)	Czech viewers (millions)
1	Kolchoz	Jan Prušinovský	Petr Kolečko	9 October 2026	TBA	
2	Volby	Jan Prušinovský	Petr Kolečko	16 October 2026	TBA	
3	Chálka	Jan Prušinovský	Petr Kolečko	23 October 2026	TBA	
4	Návštěvy	Jan Prušinovský	Petr Kolečko	30 October 2026	TBA	
5	Vendeta	Jan Prušinovský	Petr Kolečko	6 November 2026	TBA	
6	Venkaři	Jan Prušinovský	Petr Kolečko	13 November 2026	TBA	
7	Pomlázka	Jan Prušinovský	Petr Kolečko	20 November 2026	TBA	
8		Jan Prušinovský	Petr Kolečko	27 November 2026	TBA	
9		Jan Prušinovský	Petr Kolečko	4 December 2026	TBA	
10		Jan Prušinovský	Petr Kolečko	11 December 2026	TBA	
