= Michalina Olszańska =

Polish actress and writer (born 1992)

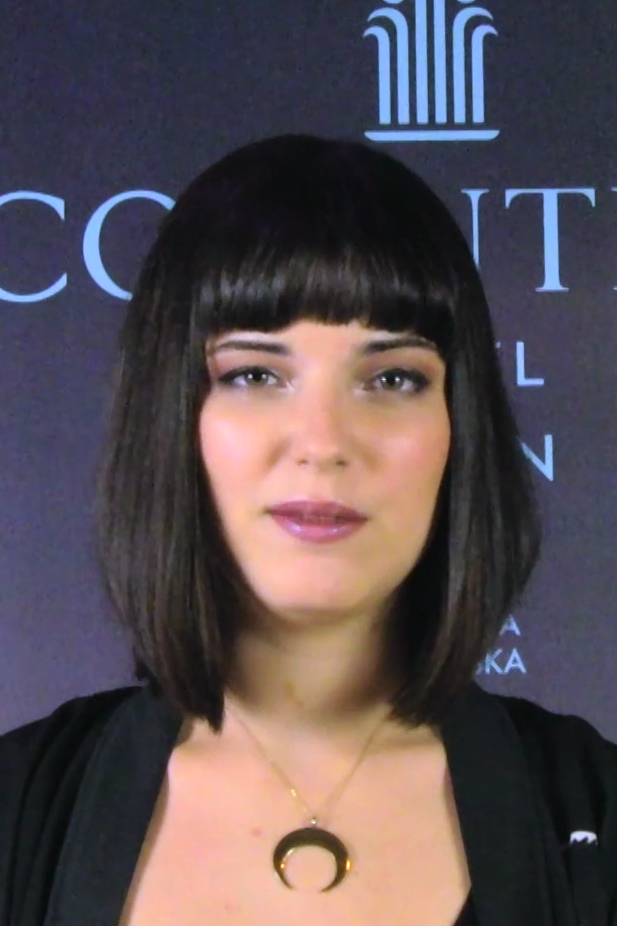
- Olszańska in 2018
- Born: 29 June 1992 (age 33); Warsaw, Poland
- Occupation: Actress
- Years active: 2013–present
- Spouse: Bartosz Rozbicki (m. 2019)
- Children: 1

Michalina Olszańska (born 29 June 1992) is a Polish actress and writer. She is a daughter of actors Agnieszka Fatyga and Wojciech Olszański. She has published two novels as a teenager.

For her role in I, Olga Hepnarová she received the Minsk International Film Festival Award for best leading actress in 2016 and the Czech Film Critics' Award for best actress in 2017.

Michalina has starred in the Netflix original Polish-language series 1983, playing the role of Ofelia "Effy" Ibrom. The series premiered worldwide on 30 November 2018.

== Films (partial list) ==
- The Occupation (2019) - Nadya
- Sobibor (2018) - Hanna
- Clash of Futures (German: Krieg der Träume) (2018) - Pola Negri
- Carga (2018) - Viktoriya / Alanna
- Matilda (2017) - Mathilde Kschessinska
- I, Olga Hepnarová (2016) - Olga Hepnarová
- Anatomia Zla (2015) - Halina
- The Lure (2015) - Golden
- Warsaw 44 (2014) - dancer
- Jack Strong (2014) - Iza

== Series ==
Year	Title	Role	Director
2012–2015	Barwy szczęścia (The Colors of Happiness)	singer Tina (episodes: 816–1283)	various
2013	Komisarz Alex	Kinga Lenart (episode: 37)	Robert Wichrowski
2016	Komisja morderstw (Commission of Murders)	Bridge Hoym, a professor's daughter (episode: 1)	Jarosław Marszewski
2018	Drogi Wolności (Roads of Freedom)	Ester Holtorp	Maciej Migas
2018	1983	Ofelia "Effy" Ibrom	Agnieszka Holland
2023	The Witcher	Marti Södergren	Loni Peristere

== Books ==
- Zakleta. Albatros. 2011. ISBN 9788376591643.
- Dziecko Gwiazd Atlantyda. Albatros. 2009. ISBN 9788373599680.
