= Odznak Vysočina =

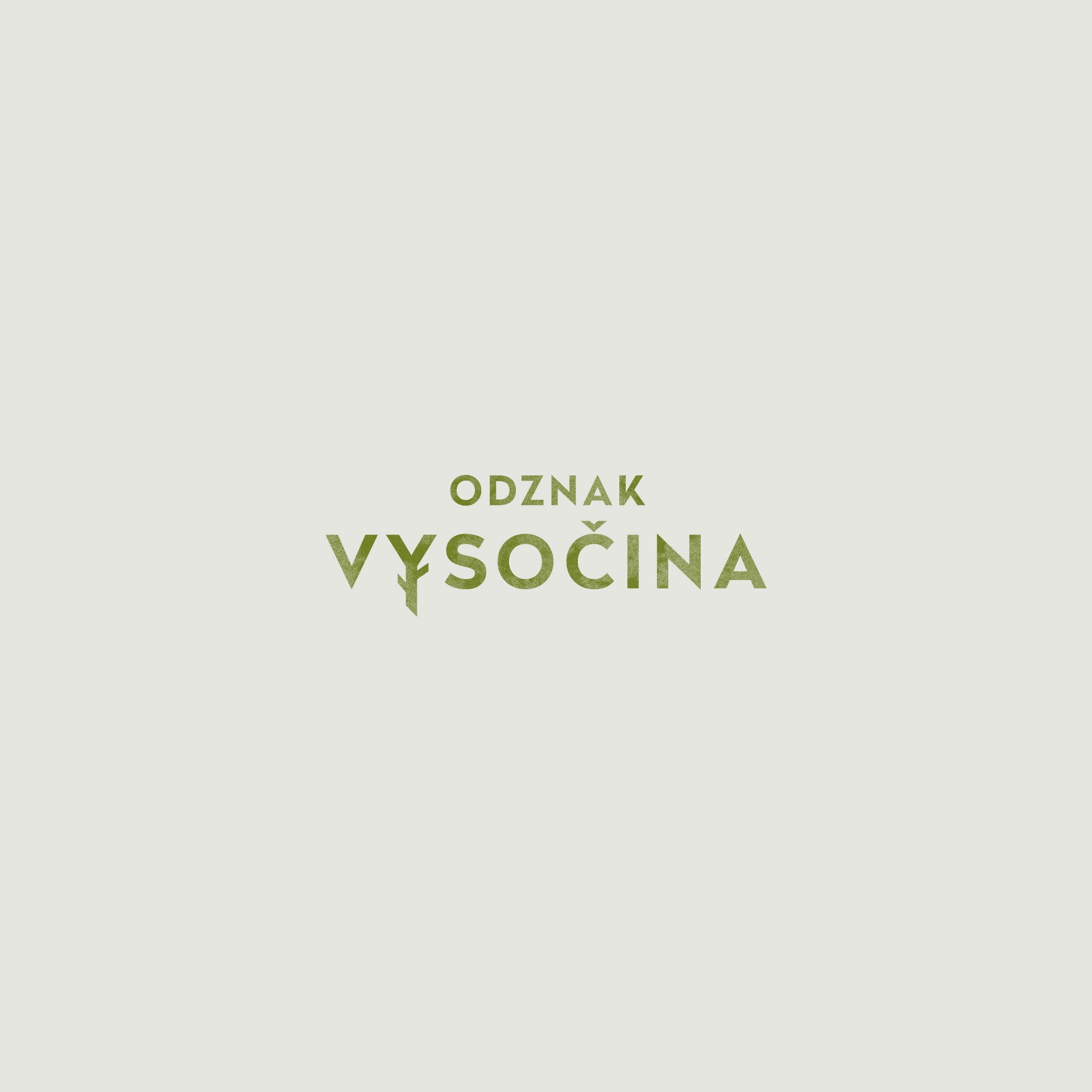
- Genre: Crime drama
- Directed by: Pavel Soukup; Andy Fehu
- Starring: Monika Hilmerová; Simona Zmrzlá; Martin Hofmann; Michal Suchánek; Patrik Děrgel
- Country of origin: Czech Republic
- Original language: Czech
- No. of seasons: 2
- No. of episodes: 16

Production
- Running time: 45-55 minutes

Original release
- Network: TV Nova
- Release: January 13, 2022

Odznak Vysočina is a Czech crime drama television series which premiered on TV Nova in 2022. It was filmed in cooperation with Vratislav Šlajer's company Bionaut. The team of investigators consists of Dana Skálová, Kateřina Vlčková, Petr Bach, Karel Šmíd and Vašek Kocián. Series is directed by Andy Fehu and Pavel Soukup. First episode premiered on 13 January 2022. On 25 July 2022, TV Nova announced that the series was renewed for season 2 which would consist 8 episodes. It started broadcast on 5 March 2023. The series is renewed for third season which started shooting in September 2023. Season 3 starts broadcast on 12 May 2024.

== Plot ==
The small town of Veselá, which looks idyllic at first glance - "everyone" knows each other and meets each other on the way to school and work, moreover, in the picturesque surroundings of Vysočina, which, however, can often show its rough side. A smaller criminal police department led by Dana Skálová is located in Veselá.

Even small towns and rural areas are not spared from serious crimes, although they are not serial killers or strange or brutal cases, but they still affect the life of the entire community. The interaction between individual participants or suspects who lie and accuse each other is important, there are also unreliable witnesses and other characters who can properly complicate the investigation. The secret is hidden precisely in the people, their fates and motivations rather than in the constructed execution of the murder itself. The search for the perpetrator is therefore the joint work of the entire team.

At the same time, we unravel the private lives of the main characters, watching how they deal with dramatic events during the investigation, but also with their own past and ideas about life.

== Cast and characters ==
- Monika Hilmerová as mjr. Dana Skálová
- Simona Zmrzlá as kpt. Kateřina Vlčková
- Michal Suchánek as kpt. Karel Šmíd
- Martin Hofmann as npor. Petr Bach
- Patrik Děrgel as por. Vašek Kocián
- Pavel Řezníček as plk. Valter Kožíšek (since season 2)
- Pavel Batěk as kpt. Petr Ondřejovský
- Petr Polák as mjr. Leoš Slepička
- Martina Jindrová as Julie Maxová
- Filip Březina as Marek Vranný
- Ondřej Nosálek as Daniel Vlček, Kateřina's husband
- Helena Dvořáková as Helena Mrázová, Karel's friend
- Pavel Soukup as Karel Bach, Petr's father

== Locations ==
The Highlands Region (Kraj Vysočina) are full of still-undiscovered natural beauties, but at the same time, they are somewhat rough and inhospitable. Mysterious nooks and crannies, individual houses scattered across the countryside, deep mixed forests, picturesque villages, and sunny plains – crime stories in the Odznak Vysočina series take place everywhere. The center of everything is the small town of Veselá.

The town of Veselá is "played" by Ledeč nad Sázavou in the series. In its center is a modern house with a view of the Ledeč Castle, and it is in this house that the police station is located. In addition to the homes of some of the main characters, another important location is the gas station in Zbýšov.

Episodic locations, places of crimes and investigations, which take viewers, for example, among wolf breeders, foresters, to a local school, a bar by the pond, or a brothel, also play their irreplaceable role. They were filmed in Koňkovice, Kouty, Kounice, or around Dobrá Voda. A visit to Golčův Jeníkov or Lipnice nad Sázavou is also a must.

Of course, nature is an integral part of the plot, which often enters the stories as a key factor. It was filmed, for example, at a campsite by the river or in the forests around Ledeč. But corpses can also be found in very romantic locations, for example, near Stvořidle, which is a beautiful section of the Sázava full of rapids between Smrčná and the village of the same name, Stvořidla. The Melechov nature park or the trout paradise of Kožlí will also appear in the series.
