= Olesko (disambiguation) =

Olesko is a settlement in Ukraine. Oleško is a municipality and village in the Czech Republic. Olesko or Oleško may also refer to:

- Březová-Oleško, a municipality in the Czech Republic
- Kathryn Olesko, American historian of science
- Olesko Castle, in Ukraine
