= Leoš Noha =

Czech actor

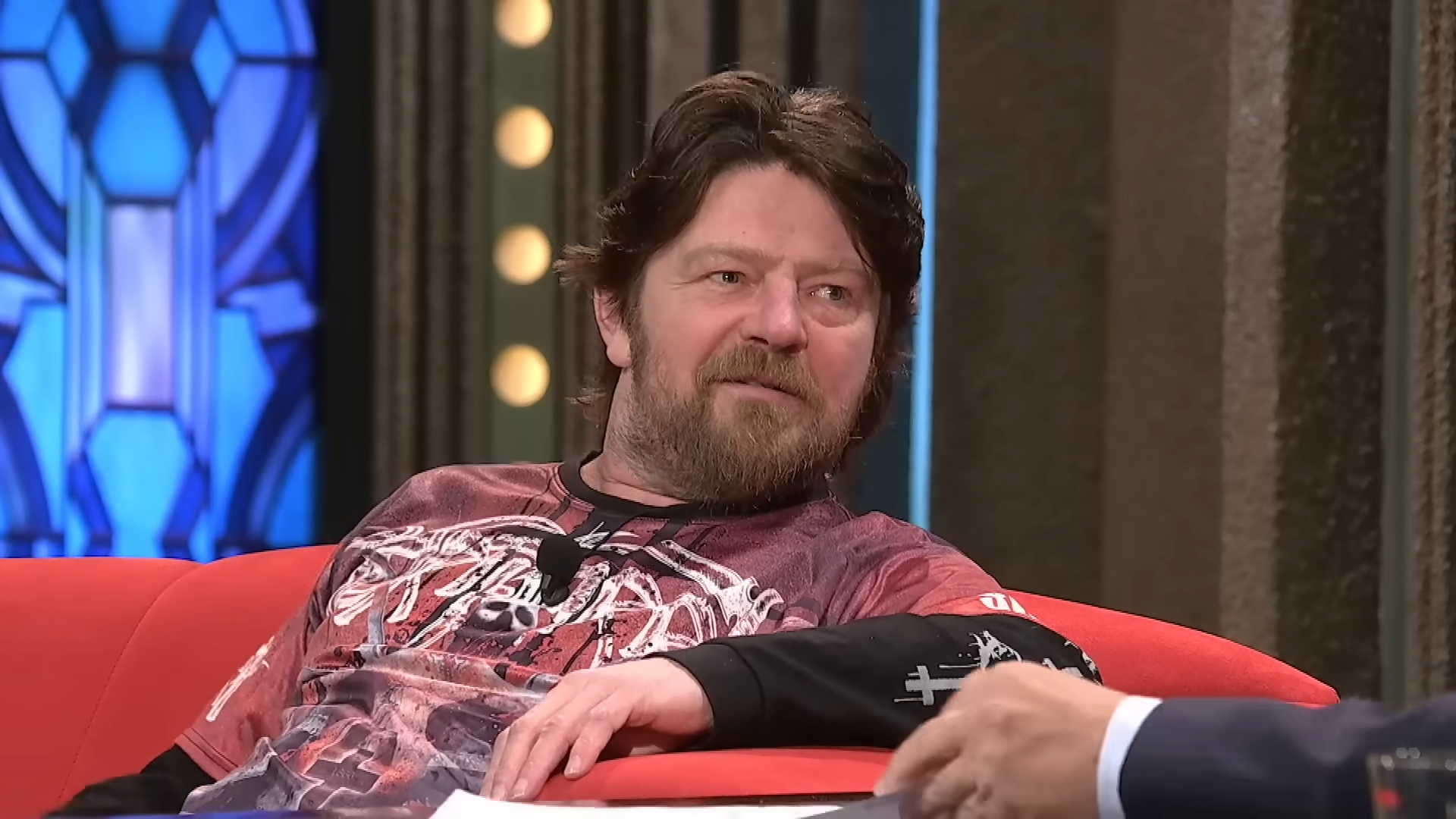
- Leoš Noha (2023)
- Born: 4 May 1968 (age 57); Ústí nad Labem, Czechoslovakia
- Occupation: Actor
- Years active: 1992–present

Leoš Noha (born 4 May 1968) is a Czech actor.

== Selected filmography ==
=== Film ===
- František je děvkař (2008)
- Protector (2009)
- Alois Nebel (2011)
- Sunday League – Pepik Hnatek's Final Match (2012)
- Nenasytná Tiffany (2015)
- Špindl (2017)

=== Television ===
- Comeback (2008)
- Okresní přebor (2010)
- Helena (2012)
- Vinaři (2014)
- Wasteland (2016)
- Pěstírna (2017)
- Štafl (2018)
- Vzteklina (2018)
- Most! (2019)
- Banáni (2023)
- To se vysvětlí, soudruzi! (2024)
- Dcera národa (2024)
