= Helena (TV series) =

- Genre: Comedy
- Written by: Tomáš Baldýnský, Petra Soukupová, Evžen Gogela, Tomáš Pártl, Monika Wildová, Jiří Vaněk, Tomáš Holeček, Tomáš Syrovátka, Lucie Bokšteflová, Richard Malatinský, Zdeněk Dušek
- Directed by: Ivo Macharáček, Ján Novák
- Starring: Sandra Pogodová, Leoš Noha, Martina Kavanová, Kristýna Belzová
- Country of origin: Czech Republic
- Original language: Czech
- No. of seasons: 4
- No. of episodes: 58

Production
- Running time: 26 minutes

Original release
- Network: TV Nova
- Release: 22 March 2012 – December 29, 2018

Helena is a Czech television sitcom broadcast since March 22, 2012 on TV Nova. The series depicts the family life of the large Musil family headed by Helena, played by Sandra Pogodová. The creators of Helena found inspiration in the American TV sitcom Roseanne.

TV Nova reported in 2014 that a fourth series was in the works. But later it was announced in the Volejte Novu program that the next season is not being prepared. However the fourth season was eventually broadcast in September 2018.

== About the series ==
Helena follows Helena Musilová (Sandra Pogodová), a determined woman who has put aside her personal ambitions for the sake of her family and faces the everyday joys and difficulties of family life with humour and optimism. The Musils are portrayed as an average working-class family with an above-average number of children. Helena has to cope with a range of financial and relationship problems while at the same time going to work and taking care of her household. According to the creators, the series combines elements of a traditional sitcom with family drama and is sometimes described as a "sitcom-non-sitcom". Producer Evžen Gogela has emphasised that the story focuses on Helena’s ability to approach problems with distance and perspective.

At the beginning of the second season, the narrative places greater emphasis on Helena's sister Klára (portrayed first by Martha Issová and later by Petra Hřebíčková), who undergoes a major turning point in her life. After losing her job, Klára unexpectedly decides to join the police and eventually becomes a police constable. As a supportive sister, she helps Helena during personal crises and often steps in to assist with the household and the care of the children.

The third season takes place several years later and depicts the family in a more difficult life situation. The Musils face financial problems, the loss of employment and the departure of their daughter Lucie (Martina Kavanová) from home. Despite these challenges, the family continues to address its problems with humour and mutual support.

== Cast and characters ==
- Sandra Pogodová as Helena Musilová
- Leoš Noha as Dan Musil
- Martina Kavanová as Lucie Musilová
- Kristýna Belzová as Tereza Musilová (Season 1-3)
  - Kamila Mottlová as Tereza Musilová (Season 4)
- Jan Maršál as Marek Musil
- Martha Issová as Klára Brázdová (season 1)
  - Petra Hřebíčková as Klára Brázdová (season 2-4)

== Production ==
It is based on sitcom Roseanne. Ivo Macharáček known for films Panic je nanic or Tajemství staré bambitky and Ján Novák directed the series. TV Nova was confident the series will be as successful as its other sitcoms Comeback and Hospoda. Four seasons were filmed in Hostivař ateliers. Pregnancy off Martha Issová was the largest problem for the production and it required her recasting by Petra Hřebíčková in season 2.

=== Theme ===
The opening theme song of the series Helena, which is broadcast every few minutes of the series, begins with samples from individual episodes of the series. After the demos, the individual actors are introduced, where an imaginary line always pops up in the corner with the character's name suspended by pegs on it and the actor's name below it. After the introduction of the individual actors, samples from the episodes start again. The end of the jingle is followed by the arrival of a string with the series title "Helena", then a bird flies in and sits on the string, blasting one of the pegs holding the letter "a". After the jingle, the episode starts, where the title of the episode is displayed. Only the main characters are introduced in the opening theme song.

=== Rating ===
The series premiered on March 22, 2012 on Nova TV. The premiere episode called Perný den attracted 1.211 million viewers over the age of 15, which meant a share of 34.66%. In the younger 15-54 group, the show's share reached 38.76%.
