= I, Olga Hepnarová =

2016 film

- Film poster
- Directed by: Tomáš Weinreb; Petr Kazda
- Written by: Tomáš Weinreb; Petr Kazda
- Starring: Michalina Olszańska
- Cinematography: Adam Sikora
- Edited by: Vojtech Fric
- Music by: Marián Varga
- Distributed by: Strand Releasing; Mubi
- Release dates: 11 February 2016 (Berlin); 24 March 2016 (Czech Republic)
- Running time: 105 minutes
- Country: Czech Republic
- Language: Czech
- Box office: $ 227 466

I, Olga Hepnarová (Czech: Já, Olga Hepnarová) is a 2016 internationally co-produced drama film, directed by Tomáš Weinreb and Petr Kazda, about Olga Hepnarová (1951–1975). She was a Czech mass murderer, who on 10 July 1973, killed eight people with a truck in Prague, Czechoslovakia. The film was shown in the Panorama section at the 66th Berlin International Film Festival.

== Cast ==
- Michalina Olszańska as Olga Hepnarová
- Ondřej Malý as Psychiatrist Spyrka
- Marta Mazurek as Alena
- Lukáš Bech as Prosecutor
- Juraj Nvota as Advocate
- Gabriela Míčová as Psychiatrist Rabska
- Marika Šoposká as Jitka
- Roman Zach as Psychiatrist Vaverka

== Reception ==
On review aggregator website Rotten Tomatoes, the film holds an approval rating of 78% based on 27 reviews, and an average rating of 6.9/10. The website's critical consensus reads, "As stark and riveting as its cinematography, 'I, Olga Hepnarová' takes a sober, haunting look at the life leading up to a woman's horrific real-life crime." On Metacritic, the film has a weighted average score of 57 out of 100, based on 10 critics, indicating "mixed or average reviews".

Glenn Kenny wrote review for The New York Times, "Anchored by a startling performance by Michalina Olszanska, the Czech film ‘I, Olga Hepnarova’ is an austere, hypnotic story of sadness, madness and murder." He ends his review, "Early in the movie, Ms. Olszanska, a slight, narrow-shouldered woman, plays Olga as someone trying to recede into herself, slumping and looking to the ground as she puffs on a cigarette. By the time of her trial, at which she pleads guilty and demands the death penalty, she is stiff, straight, defiant. Modern civilizations are haunted by crimes like this; ‘I, Olga Hepnarova’ persuasively suggests that the only understanding we can have of them is a terrifying one."

Writing for The Village Voice, Tanner Tafelski said "I, Olga Hepnarová is a bitter pill to swallow, focusing on the paradoxes of a misanthrope".
