= Pěstírna =

- Genre: Thriller
- Directed by: Andy Fehu
- Starring: Vojtěch Johaník; Martin Hub; Karel Hung; Hany-Huong Thanh Duong; Martin Bao; Leoš Noha
- Country of origin: Czech Republic
- Original language: Czech
- No. of seasons: 1
- No. of episodes: 10

Production
- Running time: 12 minutes

Original release
- Network: Stream.cz
- Release: April 13 – July 3, 2017

Pěstírna is a Czech web series that premiered in 2017 on internet television Stream.cz and was directed by Andy Fehu. It is a thriller about an illegal marijuana grow plant located in a small space underground. Five workers are locked up there for three months. It was inspired by a real case solved by the Czech police.

== Cast ==
- Jiří Panzner as Svoboda
- Martin Hub as Šembera
- Karel Hung as Tuan
- Hany-Huong Thanh Duong as Viki
- Martin Bao as Duong
- Leoš Noha as Pitter
- Michal Isteník as Dušan
- Vojtěch Johaník as Ondřej
- Václav Vokál as Gorila

== List of episodes ==
1. Zahradník
2. Služební cesta
3. Seznamovací kurz
4. Tour the light
5. Chlapská záležitost
6. Panna a netvor
7. Dokonalé alibi
8. Než si pro nás přijdou
9. Naděje umírá poslední
10. Atrapa

== Production ==
In order to maintain authenticity, the series was filmed in a cannabis farm. Technical cannabis was used for the filming as it grows quickly. As a result, it was not possible to reshoot footage even just a few days old.
