= Sériový manžel =

- Genre: Drama
- Written by: Jakub Votýpka; Irena Nadažy
- Directed by: Tereza Kopáčová
- Starring: Jakub Prachař; Nataša Bednářová; Jindřiška Dudziaková; Petra Hřebíčková
- Country of origin: Czech Republic
- Original language: Czech
- No. of seasons: 1
- No. of episodes: 6

Production
- Producer: Tomáš Hruška
- Cinematography: Yvon Teysslerová
- Running time: 60 Minutes

Original release
- Release: November 13, 2026

Sériový manžel (English: Serial Husband; originally known as Spřízněná duše which means Soul mate) is a 2026 Czech television series directed by Tereza Kopáčová and produced by Oneplay and TV Nova. It is loosely inspired by the true story of three women who became victims of a marriage fraudster. The main role of the marriage fraudster will be played by Jakub Prachař, with other roles featuring Nataša Bednářová, Jindřiška Dudziaková, Petra Hřebíčková, Pavel Řezníček, Jakub Štáfek, Martina Preissová and Petr Buchta.

In December 2025, it was announced that the miniseries would be released on Oneplay platform in 2027. It was eventually released on 13 November 2026.

The series is loosely inspired by the real-life case of a man who cheated 32 women and extorted a total of 18 million crowns from them. He was sentenced to 9.5 years in prison.

== Plot ==
The series tells story of three women who faced the marriage fraudster Milan Bareš. The first of them, butcher Táňa Kudláčková, is newly in love and is at the beginning of a relationship with Bareš. The second, part-time worker Mirka, is expecting a child with Bareš and dreams of a life in Prague. The third, postwoman Lída, is in a romantic relationship with Bareš.

== Cast ==
- Jakub Prachař as marriage fraudster Milan Bareš
- Nataša Bednářová as Táňa Kudláčková, Bareš's first victim
- Jindřiška Dudziaková as Mirka Zavadilová, Bareš's second victim
- Petra Hřebíčková as Lída, Bareš's third victim
- Petr Buchta as police investigator
- Lucie Vondráčková as Bareš's defense attorney
- Pavel Řezníček as father of Táňa Kudláčková
- Martina Preissová as mother of Táňa Kudláčková
- Jakub Štáfek
- Barbara Lukešová
- Ondřej Volejník
- Nela Cikánová Štefanová

== Production ==
Filming of the series took place in Prague, Central Bohemia and South Moravia from November 2025 to January 2026.
