= Monyová =

- Genre: Drama
- Created by: Marta Fenclová; Barbora Námerová; Klára Follová; Zuzana Kirchnerová
- Written by: Barbora Námerová; Ivana Sujová; Jakub Haubert
- Directed by: Zuzana Kirchnerová
- Starring: Tereza Ramba; Igor Orozovič; Kryštof Hádek
- Music by: La Petite Sonja & Hank Mancini
- Country of origin: Czech Republic
- Original language: Czech
- No. of seasons: 1
- No. of episodes: 6

Production
- Producers: Klára Follová, Veronika Finková, Johana Kolářová
- Cinematography: Lukáš Hyksa
- Editor: Zdeněk Marek
- Running time: 60 minutes
- Production companies: Film & Roll

Original release
- Network: Oneplay
- Release: May 15 – June 19, 2026

Monyová is a Czech drama biographical series. The series tells story of Czech novelist Simona Monyová who was a bestselling author in the Czech Republic but also became a victim of domestic abuse before she was murdered by her husband. It is scheduled for 2026.

The series premiered in September 2025 at the Serial Killer international series festival in Brno, where it won the Primetime Killer award for the best series from Central and Eastern Europe.

The first episode premiered on 15 May 2026 on the streaming platform Oneplay.

== Cast ==
- Tereza Ramba as Simona Monyová
- Igor Orozovič as Adam Lang, Simona's second husband
- Kryštof Hádek as Pavel, Simona's first husband
- Jenovéfa Boková as Dana, Simona's sister-in-law
- Václav Kopta as Simona's father
- Anna Prášilová as Fialová, Simona's friend
- Simona Kollárová as Simona's friend
- Klára Melíšková as Jitka Urbánková, Simona's mother
- Vojtěch Machuta as Gustav Urbánek, Simona's brother
- Jenovéfa Boková as Dana Urbánková, Simona's sister-in-law
- Martin Myšička as Jef Kratochvil
- Denisa Barešová as Pavel Strejček's girlfriend
- Taťjana Medvecká as Simona's grandmother
- Tomáš Dalecký
- Jaroslav Plesl
- Zuzana Kubovčíková-Šebová
- Filip Fajt
- Štěpán Uhlíř
- Lukáš Souček
- Johanka Racková
- Martin Kubuš as Dominik Mony, Simona's son

== Reception ==
Monyová has won an award for the Best television series of Central and Eastern Europe during Serial Killer Festival in 2025. Tereza Ramba received Harper's Bazaar award for the Best actress.
