= Men in Hope =

2011 Czech film

- Film poster
- Directed by: Jiří Vejdělek
- Written by: Jiří Vejdělek
- Produced by: Tomáš Hoffman; Jiří Vejdělek
- Starring: Jiří Macháček; Bolek Polívka; Petra Hřebíčková
- Cinematography: Martin Šácha
- Edited by: Ondřej Hokr
- Distributed by: Falcon
- Release date: 25 August 2011
- Running time: 115 minutes
- Country: Czech Republic
- Language: Czech
- Budget: 20,000,000 CZK
- Box office: 95,387,066 CZK

Men in Hope (Czech: Muži v naději) is a 2011 Czech romantic sex comedy film written and directed by Jiří Vejdělek.

== Plot ==
Ondřej (Jiří Macháček), a timid and reserved man, is in a monotonous marriage with Alice (Petra Hřebíčková). On the contrary, his promiscuous father-in-law Rudolf (Bolek Polívka) who lives next door has a happy marriage of 35 years with Marta (Simona Stašová). As Ondřej's marriage gets increasingly boring, Rudolf encourages Ondřej to imitate him to save his marriage. Ondřej rejects it but he changes his mind after he meets Šarlota (Vica Kerekes), a new date of Rudolf in a billiard room.

== Cast ==
- Jiří Macháček as Ondřej
- Bolek Polívka as Rudolf
- Petra Hřebíčková as Alice
- Vica Kerekes as Šarlota
- Simona Stašová as Marta
- Lukáš Langmajer as Louis
- Hynek Čermák as Masér
- Filip Antonio as Pavlík
- Michal Novotný as waiter in Café Max
- Jitka Čvančarová as guide
- Eliška Křenková as Irena
- Emma Smetana as Bára
- Berenika Kohoutová as young Marta
- Václav Jílek as young Rudolf

== Reception ==
Kamil Fila of Czech website Aktuálně.cz stated: "It is difficult to say when the trend began in Czech cinema with the stream of sexual innuendos replacing a coherent plot, but Men in Hope represents its peak so far."
