= Rekordwoman =

- Genre: Drama
- Written by: Dan Wlodarczyk; Hana Wlodarczyková
- Directed by: Dan Wlodarczyk
- Starring: Petr Uhlík
- Country of origin: Czech Republic
- Original language: Czech
- No. of seasons: 1
- No. of episodes: 6

Production
- Running time: 60 minutes

Original release
- Network: Oneplay

Rekordwoman is an upcoming Czech biographical series directed by Dan Wlodarczyk, who also wrote the script with his wife Hana Wlodarczyk. The story of the series is inspired by the life of athlete Zdeněk Koubek, who became famous in the 1930s as world record holder Zdena Koubková. The series, consisting of six episodes, is produced by Oneplay Original.

Petr Uhlík plays the main character, with Eva Podzimková, Yvona Stolařová, Marek Lambora, Josef Trojan, Filip Březina and Ondřej Malý appearing in other roles.

== Plot ==
The series tells the true story of Zdeněk Koubek. Koubek was previously known as Zdena Koubková, an athlete who won the 800 meters at the 1934 World Women's Games in London and broke the world record. As an intersex person, he later decided to publicly reveal his identity and change his gender, sparking one of the biggest scandals in Czechoslovak sports at the time.

== Cast ==
- Petr Uhlík as Zdeněk Koubek/Zdena Koubková
- Eva Podzimková as Lída Merlínová-Pecháčková
- Václav Jílek as Cyril Pecháček
- Marek Lambora as Zdena's older brother
- Marek Daniel as Charlie
- Yvona Stolařová as Jarmila Žáková
- Lesana Krausková as Uršula
- Josef Trojan
- Filip Březina
- Elizaveta Maximová
- Ondřej Malý
- Martin Donutil
- Michal Dalecký
- Eva Petrová

== Productřion ==
According to creative producer Klára Follová, the casting process for the lead actor was one of the most challenging she had ever experienced. The creators searched all over Europe for a suitable actor. Petr Uhlík was chosen in the.

Uhlík prepared for the role for six months before filming, during which he devoted himself to physical preparation for the role.

Filming of the series began in September 2025 and ended in November 2025. The first days of filming took place in Brno, then the crew moved to Louny, and one of the scenes also took place in the Royal Club in Prague.
