= Olga Hepnarová =

Czech mass murderer (1951–1975)

- Hepnarová's booking photo in 1973
- Born: 30 June 1951; Prague, Czechoslovakia
- Died: 12 March 1975 (aged 23); Pankrác Prison, Prague, Czechoslovakia
- Cause of death: Execution by hanging
- Status: Executed
- Motive: Revenge on society
- Conviction: Murder (8 counts)
- Penalty: Death

Details
- Date: 10 July 1973
- Locations: Prague, Czechoslovakia
- Killed: 8
- Injured: 12
- Weapon: Praga RN
- Date apprehended: 10 July 1973

Olga Hepnarová (30 June 1951 – 12 March 1975) was a Czech mass murderer who killed eight people in a truck attack in Prague on 10 July 1973. Hepnarová was convicted and sentenced to death, and was executed in 1975. She was the last woman executed in Czechoslovakia.

== Early life ==
Hepnarová prior to the murders

Olga Hepnarová was born on 30 June 1951 in Prague. Her father was a bank clerk and her mother was a dentist. Hepnarová was an average child, but later developed psychiatric problems, which manifested in an inability to communicate with people.

In school, she was often mocked by her peers. At the same time, Hepnarová was known to bully smaller children. In 1964, she attempted suicide by overdosing on her medication. She spent a year in a psychiatric ward at a hospital in Opařany, where she was beaten and abused after an attempted escape. She was declared "neither homosexual, nor heterosexual" by the specialists, and no mental illness was diagnosed.

After her release in 1966, she trained as a bookbinder at Tomos Praha. In 1969, Hepnarová left Prague to work for the public service of Cheb. She was dismissed after less than three months, working various small jobs before her father allowed her to move back in at their apartment in Prague. Hepnarová moved out again shortly after due to conflicts between her mother and paternal grandmother, buying a cabin in Oleško, from where she commuted to Prague. Hepnarová's family continued to support her career, getting her a position as a truck driver for the municipal transport services of Prague and buying her a Wartburg car. Neighbours remembered her as absent-minded, never greeting fellow residents of the village. Hepnarová's relationship with her parents deteriorated, with her once threatening to kill her mother during a visit to the cabin.

== Arson attack ==
Hepnarová's father inherited a farm in the village of Zábrodí, which the family used for recreation. On the morning of 7 August 1970, using a bottle of gasoline, Hepnarová set fire to the door in the living area of the building. She hoped that the fire would reach the hayloft via a dormer and destroy the homestead. Her sister and two tenants - the elderly Hetnerov couple - were asleep in the house at the time. They woke up and managed to extinguish the fire in time. The final damage was only 100 Kčs. Hepnarová was not suspected of the crime. She had approached the farm on foot at night after taking a taxi from Náchod. She confessed to the act during a psychiatric examination in 1973. As a motive, she stated that the property had become the cause of money disputes between her parents. She denied knowing that anyone was on the property at the time of the arson, but acknowledged having overheard her sister's plans to spend the night there.

== Career ==
At work, Hepnarová was noted as a good driver, but prone to mood swings, never socialising with her colleagues and regularly skipping work entirely. In one instance, she purposely crashed her truck during a test drive. In February 1972, she was tried for using a company vehicle without permission for non-work related purposes the prior December. She received conditional release with a ten-percent salary reduction. She was repeatedly reassigned, mostly as a personal driver, but all her clients complained about her behaviour. She eventually stopped showing up for work, leading to her dismissal in June 1972. She took a job at Pražské komunikace in August of the same year. In March 1973, she sold her cabin and bought a Trabant model car, with which she developed a deep emotional bond, to the point where she no longer spoke with other people and took repeated work absences.

== Truck attack ==
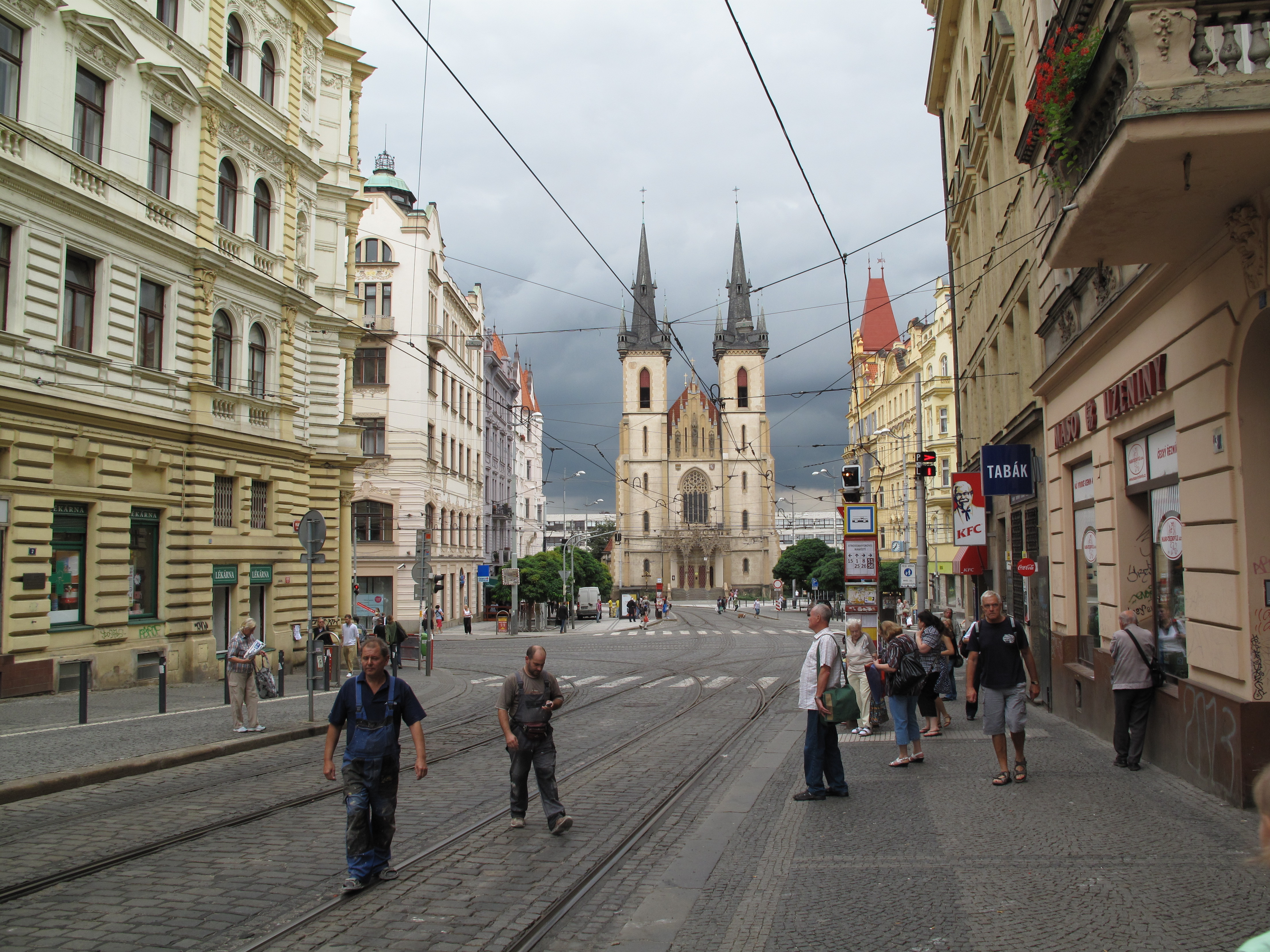
Strossmayer Square with a tram stop in the foreground

Hepnarová began planning the truck attack about six months in advance. Her original plans included derailment of an express train or detonation of an explosive in a room full of people, but she decided that these were too technically demanding and instead decided on a mass shooting: she planned to obtain an automatic firearm and fire on people on Wenceslas Square. She enrolled in the shooting ring at the Svazarm. But she changed her mind about this option also: she was afraid that she might be immediately killed, and finding such a weapon also seemed difficult. Eventually she decided to use a vehicle as her weapon.

From 11 January to 10 July 1973, Hepnarová lived in room 502 at the Babylon hostel on Plaňanská Street. On 9 July 1973, she visited a vehicle rental to rent a truck for two days, where the clerk rescheduled for the day after, as there were no cars available. That same day, Hepnarová pushed her Trabant into a ravine, as a means of "ending her [the Trabant's] existence", since she could not bear the thought of the car getting another owner. The next day, on 10 July, she successfully completed a test drive to demonstrate that she was able to control the specific type of truck she wanted to rent.

At 1:30 p.m., Hepnarová drove a rented Praga RN truck from the Defenders' of Peace (today Milada Horáková) to the Strossmayer Square (Strossmayerovo náměstí) in the Prague 7 district. Hepnarová had difficulty operating the vehicle due to her short height, as she could barely reach the pedals and had an obscured view through the windshield. An initial attempt at ramming the tram stop from the road was unsuccessful due to several cars stopping behind a scheduled tram, which picked up nearly all waiting commuters. On her second attempt, after waiting for the stop to become crowded again, she drove onto the sidewalk and rammed a group of approximately 30 people. After the vehicle crashed into a pole, witnesses tried to help Hepnarová, believing the truck had a technical failure or that she had fallen asleep. However, she immediately told a police officer, who helped her out of the cab, that she had intentionally rammed into the crowd. Three people died immediately, three more died later the same day, two within a few days (all aged from 60 to 79), and 12 people were injured but survived.

Before the attack, Hepnarová had sent a letter to two newspapers, Svobodné slovo and Mladý svět, explaining her actions as revenge for the hatred she felt was directed against her by her family and the world. The letter was received two days after the murder.

Jsem zničený člověk. Člověk zničený lidmi. Mám tedy na vybranou: zabít sebe, nebo zabít druhé. A rozhoduji se takto: OPLATÍM SVÝM NENÁVISTNÍKŮM. Kdybych odešla jako neznámý sebevrah, bylo by to pro vás příliš laciné… Já, Olga Hepnarová, oběť vaší bestiality, odsuzuji vás k trestu smrti přejetím a prohlašuji, že za můj život je x lidí málo. Acta non verba

[I am a destroyed person. A person destroyed by people. So I have a choice: kill myself or kill others. And I choose this: I WILL GET BACK ON MY HATERS. If I were to leave as an unknown suicide, it would be too cheap for you… I, Olga Hepnarová, the victim of your bestiality, condemn you to the death penalty by running you over and declare that for my life x people are not enough. Acta non verba]

== Arrest and conviction ==
During the investigation, Hepnarová confirmed her intention was to kill as many people as possible. Psychology experts found her fully aware of her actions, and she expressed no remorse. She planned her actions, as she took into account that the ground sloped down to the tram stop, which allowed her to gain speed for the maximum death toll. Hepnarová demanded to be executed. On 6 April 1974, Hepnarová was sentenced to death for murder by the City Court. The sentence was affirmed by higher instance courts and the Supreme Court re-qualified the sentence to public endangerment with the same penalty to be upheld. After several psychiatric examinations Hepnarová was deemed criminally responsible for her actions. Hepnarová's mother sought clemency for her daughter at the Supreme Court, which upheld the death sentence. A second appeal to the Prime Minister of Czechoslovakia, Lubomír Štrougal, was also refused.

=== Execution ===
Hepnarová was executed by short-drop hanging on 12 March 1975 at Pankrác Prison in Prague. She was the last woman executed in Czechoslovakia, and one of the last by the use of short-drop hanging. There are disputes over how Hepnarová faced death. Some reports say she was calm, while others say she became hysterical and started screaming and begging for her life, and that the guards had to drag her to the gallows. The customary protocol documents recording the events surrounding her execution and its aftermath did not mention her resisting the execution or expressing fear. The documents did note that Hepnarová's mother was informed the next day that her daughter's execution had taken place, and, as was customary after executions in Czechoslovakia at the time, Hepnarová's body was cremated.

== Literature and film ==
In 1991, Bohumil Hrabal published the novel Ponorné říčky, in which he describes the remorse felt by an executioner from Pankrác for sending a "beautiful lady" called Olga to the gallows. The story, which includes details such as Hepnarová fighting with the executioner, is sometimes presented as a historical account, despite the official protocol listing no unusual events.

The Czech novel Oprátka za osm mrtvých by Roman Cílek (2001) tells the story of Hepnarová, and contains a collection of contemporary documents.

I, Olga Hepnarová (Czech: Já, Olga Hepnarová) is a 2016 Czech-Polish drama film directed by Tomáš Weinreb and Petr Kazda. It was shown in the Panorama section at the 66th Berlin International Film Festival, Official selection at the 51st Karlovy Vary International Film Festival and Official selection at São Paulo International Film Festival 2016. The film received worldwide distribution by One World Digital.

== See also ==
- Vehicle-ramming attack
