= Martin Hofmann =

Czech actor

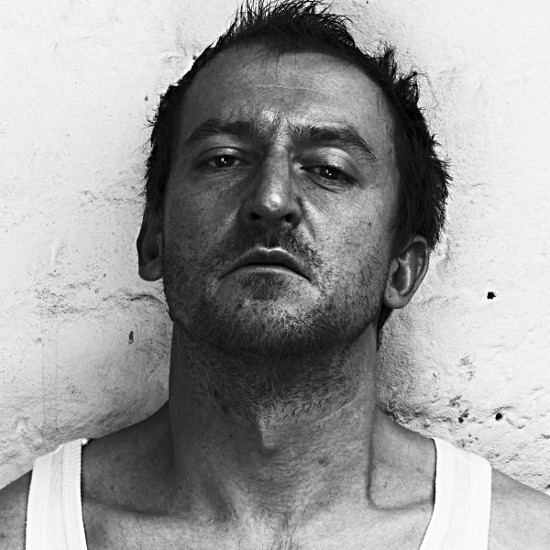
- Hofmann in 2011
- Born: 31 March 1978 (age 47); České Budějovice, Czechoslovakia
- Occupation: Actor
- Years active: 1999–present
- Website: mhofmann.cz

Martin Hofmann (born 31 March 1978) is a Czech actor.

== Selected filmography ==
=== Film ===
- Pleasant Moments (2006)
- A Prominent Patient (2016)
- The Affair (2019)
- Women on the Run (2019)
- Shotgun Justice (2019)
- Havel (2020)
- Bet on Friendship (2021)
- Borders of Love (2022)
- Střídavka (2022)
- Waves (2024)

=== Television ===
- Ulice (2005)
- Terapie (2011)
- Trpaslík (2017)
- Rédl (2018)
- Most! (2019)
- The Sleepers (2019)
- Odznak Vysočina (2022)
