= Oneplay =

Czech subscription video on demand service

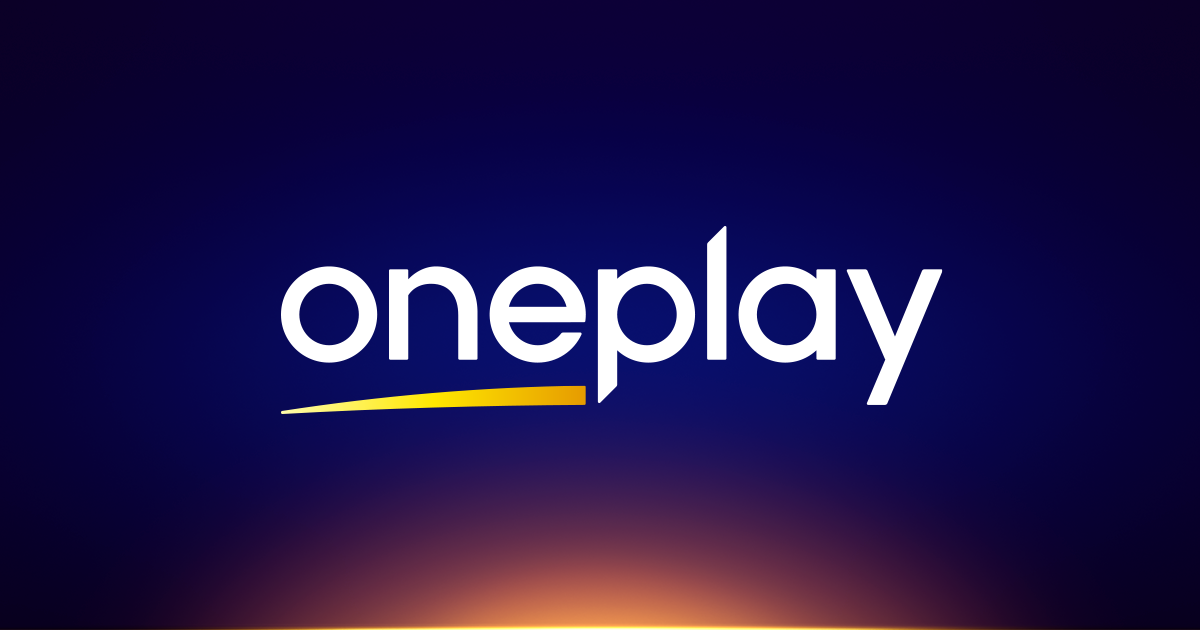
- Website type: OTT streaming platform
- Country of origin: Czech Republic
- Area served: Czech Republic
- Products: Streaming media; video on demand; digital distribution
- Parent: PPF
- Website: https://www.oneplay.cz/
- Registration: Required
- Launched: 10 March 2025; 19 months ago
- Current status: Active

Oneplay is a Czech digital television and paid VOD service providing films, series, shows and sports broadcasts online. It was created by the merger of Czech Voyo (TV Nova) and O2 TV (O2 Czech Republic) brands belonging to the PPF group. It was launched on 10 March 2025.

== Own channels ==
Oneplay provides 4 sport channels.

- Oneplay Sport 1 former O_{2} TV Sport
- Oneplay Sport 2 former O_{2} TV Fotbal
- Oneplay Sport 3
- Oneplay Sport 4

== Content ==
=== Original programming ===
Original series and feature films are released on Voyo under the label Oneplay Originals, which are exclusively available only on this platform.

Oneplay original programmingOneplay original programming
Title	Genre	Premiere	Notes
Ordinace v růžové zahradě 2	Soap opera	10 March 2025	Since 10th episode of season 24
Extrémní proměny	Reality show	12 March 2025	Since 10th episode of season 24
The King of Šumava: The Phantom of the Dark Land	Adventure crime thriller	14 March 2025	Season 2
Medvěd	Documentary	11 April 2025	
Bóra	Crime comedy	13 June 2025	
Případ Janákovi	Documentary	1 August 2025	
Případy Jiřího Markoviče	Documentary	3 October 2025	
Štěstíčku naproti	Crime comedy	31 October 2025	
Slovan Liberec: Zpátky na vrchol	Documentary	14 November 2025	
Metoda Markovič: Straka	Crime	9 January 2026	
Bohyně Slavie	Documentary	20 February 2026	
Pád domů Kollerů	Comedy	13 March 2026	
Monyová	Drama	15 May 2026	
Případ Rigo: Ponožkový vrah	Documentary	17 July 2026	
Leoš	Documentary	24 April 2026	
Láska nebolí	Documentary	26 June 2026	
Extraktoři	Action thriller	7 August 2026	Season 2

=== Upcoming original programming ===
Oneplay original programmingOneplay original programming
Title	Genre	Planned Premiere	Notes
Miluji tě navždy, táta	Drama	TBA	
Rekordwoman	Drama	2026	
Oddíl B	Comedy	2026	
Spřízněná duše	Drama	2027	
Kutnohorská kauza	Crime drama	2027	
Bitcoinová kauza	Thriller	TBA	
Krev	Crime drama	2027	
Já, pomsta	Romantic thriller	2027	
Zde žijí duchové	Comedy	2027	
Kafka	Psychological thriller	TBA	
