= Adam Sikora =

Polish cinematographer (born 1960)

- Born: 3 May 1960 (age 66); Mikołów
- Citizenship: Polish
- Occupation: Cinematographer

Adam Sikora (born 3 May 1960) is a cinematographer, screenwriter and film director.

== Biography ==
In 1988 he graduated in cinematography from the Łódź Film School. He obtained doctorate in 2009 and habilitation in 2014. He was employed as an academic teacher at the Krzysztof Kieślowski Film School. He became a member of the Polish Society of Cinematographers (PSC). His son Łukasz Sikora is an actor and director.

== Filmography ==
=== Director of photography ===
- Dama kameliowa (1994)
- Drugi brzeg (1997 film) (1997)
- Wojaczek (1999)
- Angelus (2001)
- Eukaliptus (2001)
- Four Nights with Anna (2008)
- Las (2009)
- Essential Killing (2010)
- The Mill and the Cross (2011)
- In the Shadow (2012)
- I, Olga Hepnarová (2016)
- Ach śpij kochanie (2017)

=== Director ===
- Ewa (2010)
- Autsajder (2018)

== Accolades ==
He won Polish Film Award Eagle for best cinematography for Four Nights with Anna in 2009. He also won Czech Lion Award for In the Shadow.
