= Arnošt Goldflam =

Czech playwright and academic

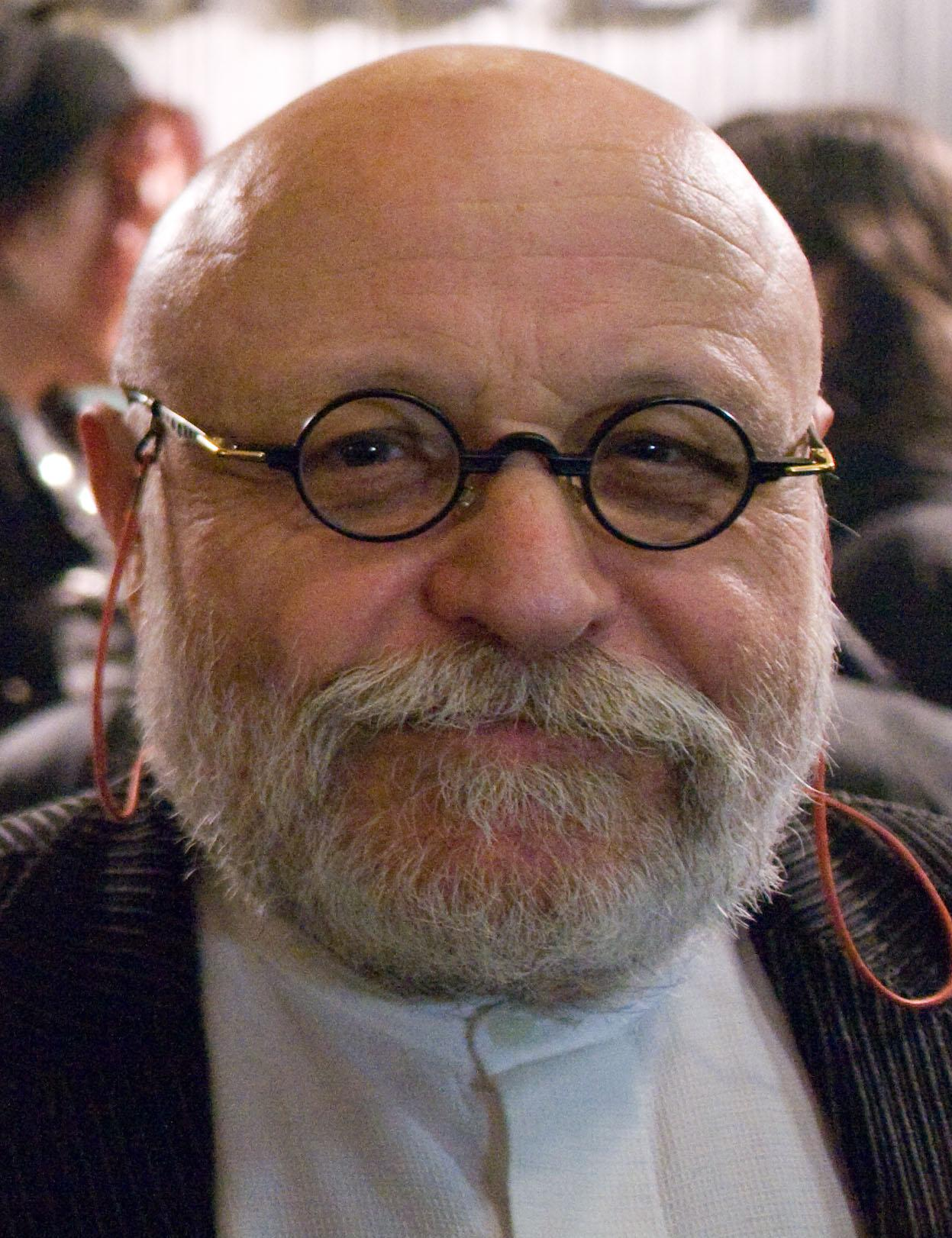
Goldflam in Prague, 2010

Arnošt Goldflam (born 22 September 1946 in Brno) is a Czech playwright, writer, director, screenwriter, and actor. He appeared in more than thirty films between 1986 and 2011.

== Selected filmography ==
Film
Year	Title	Role	Notes
2017	The Zookeeper's Wife	Janusz Korczak	
2011	The Magical Duvet		
2008	František je děvkař		
2005	Close to Heaven		
1992	The Inheritance or Fuckoffguysgoodday		

== Awards ==
- 2026 Medal of Merit
