= Zdena Hadrbolcová =

Czech actress (1937–2023)

- Hadrbolcová in Bohous (1968)
- Born: 13 July 1937; Prague, Czechoslovakia
- Died: 20 November 2023 (aged 86)
- Occupation(s): Actress, playwright
- Years active: 1959–2020

Zdena Hadrbolcová (13 July 1937 – 20 November 2023) was a Czech actress.

== Life ==
Zdena Hadrbolcová was born on 13 July 1937 in Prague. She was educated at a French grammar school in Prague and studied theatre directing at the Academy of Performing Arts in Prague.

Hadrbolcová was briefly married while a student. For most of her life she was in a relationship with camera operator Jiří Průcha. They opted not to pursue marriage and remain childless. In addition to her native Czech, she was fluent in English, French, and Italian.

Hadrbolcová was hospitalised in December 2022. She died on 20 November 2023, at the age of 86.

== Career ==
Following her graduation, she acted in various Prague theatres, including Palmovka Theatre, Theatre on the Edge, and Theatre on the Balustrade. In addition to acting, she also wrote theatre plays. In the 1970s, she wrote Paraple paní Černé, a detective novel.

In addition to her theatre work, Hadrbolcová acted in 112 movies and 18 television series. Her notable appearances include Páni kluci (1976), Hop – a je tu lidoop (1978), How the World Is Losing Poets (1982), The Idiot Returns (1999), and František je děvkař (2008). She was also a long-term recurring cast member of the soap opera Ulice, in which she starred from 2005 to 2020.
