= Ela Lehotská =

Slovak actress

Ela Lehotská (born 1973) is a Slovak actress. She has appeared in a Czech film Puritptýz and played Bep Voskuijl in the 2001 ABC miniseries Anne Frank: The Whole Story. In 2008, she starred in the film František je děvkař. Besides, Ela is also a stage actress.

== Selected performances ==
- 2006 – Miriam in The Floods by Alice Nellis, Theatre on the Balustrade, Prague
- 2005 – Helen in Under the Blue Sky by David Eldridge, Theatre on the Balustrade, Prague
- 2002 – Julika Jenkins in Top Dogs by Urs Widmer, HaDivadlo, Brno
- 2001 – Anne Frank: The Whole Story as Bep Voskuijl

== Filmography ==
- František je děvkař (2008) .... Eliška, František's wife
- Mesto tieňov (2008) TV series .... Zuzana Hrubešová (episode Chladnokrvne 25 April 2008)
- Private Traps (2008) TV series... Oldřich's girlfriend (episode Smím prosit o lásku?)
- La Dame d'Izieu (2007) .... Rachel
- Anne Frank: The Whole Story (2001) .... Bep Voskuijl
