= Stuck with a Perfect Woman =

2016 Czech comedy film

- Directed by: Tomáš Hoffman
- Written by: Jiří Vejdělek; Tomáš Hoffman; Martin Horský
- Produced by: Tomáš Hoffman; Jiří Vejdělek; Marek Jeníček
- Starring: Petra Hřebíčková; Ondřej Vetchý
- Cinematography: Jan Drnek
- Release date: 13 October 2016
- Running time: 97 minutes
- Country: Czechia
- Language: Czech

Stuck with a Perfect Woman (Czech: Bezva ženská na krku) is a 2016 Czech comedy film directed by Tomáš Hoffman.

== Cast and characters ==
- Petra Hřebíčková as Eliška Vomáčková
- Ondřej Vetchý as Bohumil Šťastný
- Miroslav Táborský as Jaroslav Zezulka
- Jiří Langmajer as Pavel Vomáčka
- Tereza Kostková as Klára Vomáčková
