= František je děvkař =

2008 Czech comedy film

- Directed by: Jan Prušinovský
- Written by: Jan Prušinovský
- Produced by: Martin Hřebačka; Ondřej Zima
- Starring: Josef Polášek
- Cinematography: Petr Bednář
- Edited by: Otakar Šenovský
- Release date: 5 June 2008
- Running time: 80 minutes
- Country: Czech Republic
- Language: Czech

František je děvkař (František is a Womanizer) is a Czech comedy film directed by Jan Prušinovský. It was released in 2008.

== Cast ==
- Josef Polášek - František Soukenický
- Ela Lehotská - Eliška - František's wife
- Martin Pechlát - Viktor Outrata
- Zdena Hadrbolcová - František's mother
- Petra Nesvačilová - Natálie Holoubková
- Leoš Noha - Miloš - František's brother
- Arnošt Goldflam - Professor Perník
- Petr Čtvrtníček - Jarda Kopecký
- Barbara Trojanová - Iveta Loudová
- Marika Sarah Procházková - Peggy - Miloš' wife
