= Extraktoři =

- Genre: Action thriller
- Written by: Jan Stehlík; Jaroslav Kmenta; Evita Naušová
- Directed by: Roman Kašparovský
- Starring: Jakub Štáfek; Jan Révai; Pavla Gajdošíková
- Country of origin: Czech Republic
- Original language: Czech
- No. of seasons: 2
- No. of episodes: 12

Production
- Running time: 55 minutes
- Production company: MOVIE s.r.o

Original release
- Network: Voyo (season 1); Oneplay (season 2)
- Release: October 27, 2023

Extraktoři (English: Extractors) is a Czech action espionage thriller series produced by Voyo Originál.

The story is inspired by real events. The filming itself took place in Prague and Central Bohemia and Turkey. The author of the subject and co-screenwriter is investigative journalist Jaroslav Kmenta.

Extractors offer insight into the world of espionage and international covert operations. It provides a behind-the-scenes look at negotiations with terrorists, a topic that is often kept quiet by the world's governments, although they participate unofficially. Extractors are concerned with ensuring the safety of Czech citizens across borders, even at the cost of complex negotiations and solutions outside of traditional diplomatic channels.

In 2025 the series was renewed for second season which would consist of 4 episodes with Révai and Štáfek set to reprise their roles from the first season. The second season was scheduled to begin filming in Turkey on 1 May 2025. The plot would be set in places like Libya, Colombia, Lebanon, Syria and Iran. First episode of season 2 premiered on 7 August 2026.

== Plot ==
The story focuses on a special unit of Czech intelligence, known as the Extractors. The unit operates in secret and its main mission is to ensure the safe return of endangered Czechs from abroad. Their work is full of risks, as they often find themselves in difficult situations in foreign countries far from home.

=== Season 1 ===
When Dana and Teresa disappear in Pakistan, Office for Foreign Relations and Information (ÚZSI) gives Colonel Leona Váchová a task to investigate their disappearance. She sends field agents Petr and Ted to the area. Petr and Ted start to track down kidnappers in order to save both girls while Leona has to supervise both agents and deal with personal drama involving her sister Monika.

=== Season 2 ===
Ted and Petr must face not only dangerous missions abroad but also complicated spy games as ÚZSI gets in conflict with Military Intelligence as both agencies operate with a different agenda, different rules — and a different idea of what is in national interest.

== Cast ==
- Pavla Gajdošíková as Colonel Leona Váchová
- Jan Révai as field agent Petr Čech
- Jakub Štáfek as field agent Theodor "Ted" Walla
- Ján Koleník as Public prosecutor Viktor Suk
- Sofie Anna Švehlíková as Monika Váchová
- Gabriela Heclová as Tereza Maláčová
- Michaela Petřeková as Dana Vojtová
- Jiří Štrébl as General Antonín Machar
- Roman Zach as Deputy Prime Minister Jan Švejda
- Lukáš Duy Anh Tran as analyst Richard „Spinner“ Lapko
- Jitka Schneiderová as Ivana Váchová, Leona's mother
- Zuzana Čapková as Marcela Vojtová, Dana's mother
- David Matásek as Robert Maláč
- Zuzana Novotná as Kristyna Maláčová
- Martina Preissová as Jitka Maláčová
- Jordan Haj as secretary Abdul
- Jiří Ployhar as journalist Kracík
- Jaroslav Plesl as Mirek Pouzar
- Barbora Mottlová as curator Aneta

== Production ==
The series was announced in June 2022. First season was filmed in 2022 and 2023. Filming took place in the Czech Republic and in Turkey. Some parts were filmed near Turkish-Iran border.

== Episodes ==
=== Season 1 ===
| No. | Title | Directed by | Written by | Original release date |
|---|---|---|---|---|
| 1 | "Únos" | Roman Kašparovský | Jan Stehlík, Jaroslav Kmenta, Evita Naušová | October 27, 2023 |
| 2 | "Tým" | Roman Kašparovský | Jan Stehlík, Jaroslav Kmenta, Evita Naušová | November 3, 2023 |
| 3 | "Naděje" | Roman Kašparovský | Jan Stehlík, Jaroslav Kmenta, Evita Naušová | November 10, 2023 |
| 4 | "Písečná bouře" | Roman Kašparovský | Jan Stehlík, Jaroslav Kmenta, Evita Naušová | November 17, 2023 |
| 5 | "Dohoda" | Roman Kašparovský | Jan Stehlík, Jaroslav Kmenta, Evita Naušová | November 24, 2023 |
| 6 | "Svoboda" | Roman Kašparovský | Jan Stehlík, Jaroslav Kmenta, Evita Naušová | December 1, 2023 |

=== Season 2 ===
| No. | Title | Directed by | Written by | Original release date |
|---|---|---|---|---|
| 1 | "Episode 1" | Jan Pavlacký | Jan Stehlík | August 7, 2026 |
| 2 | "Episode 2" | Jan Pavlacký | Jan Stehlík | August 14, 2026 |
| 3 | "Episode 3" | Jan Pavlacký | Jan Stehlík | August 21, 2026 |
| 4 | "Episode 4" | Jan Pavlacký | Jan Stehlík | August 28, 2026 |
| 5 | "Episode 5" | Jan Pavlacký | Jan Stehlík | September 4, 2026 |
| 6 | "Episode 6" | Jan Pavlacký | Jan Stehlík | September 11, 2026 |
