= Štěstíčku naproti =

- Genre: Crime, Comedy
- Written by: Ondřej Gabriel; Tomáš Vávra
- Directed by: Marek Najbrt
- Starring: Marek Daniel; Václav Neužil; Denisa Barešová; Andrej Polák
- Country of origin: Czech Republic
- Original language: Czech
- No. of seasons: 1
- No. of episodes: 6

Production
- Cinematography: Martin Štěpánek
- Running time: 58–60 minutes
- Production company: Punk Film

Original release
- Network: Oneplay
- Release: October 31 – December 5, 2025

Štěstíčku naproti (lit. 'Opposite to happiness') is a Czech crime comedy television series, that premiered on Oneplay in 2025. It was inspired by a real corruption case from the early 2000s. It tells story of a football manager Ivan, a heartthrob from Prague's Žižkov, and manager of a local first-league football club and police investigator Marek, who happens to be the subject of a bribery case in a lower football competition, was also inspired by the popular theatre play "Ivánku, kamaráde, můžeš mluvit?", according to the creators. Marek Daniel, who plays manager Ivan, also played in this play.

The series premiered at the international Serial Killer series festival in September 2025. It was included in the main competition section.

The story of the series is described as the first major case of systemic corruption in the most watched Czech sport, football, and is told from the perspectives of both the investigators and the perpetrators.

The series is directed by Marek Najbrt, who filmed the series based on a script by Tomáš Vávra and Ondřej Gabriel.

The series is produced by the production company Punk Film, headed by producers Martin Hůlovec and Ondřej Beránek. The executive producer for Punk Film was Filip Čermák, and for Oneplay was Vladana Horná.

== Plot ==
A new investigator, Marek (Václav Neužil), joins the anti-corruption police unit in Brno. As a rookie, he is immediately assigned a case of small bribes in a lower football competition. And then two, from his perspective, strange operatives join the team. Marek trains football students, so he immediately gets involved in the case and soon, thanks to the very colorful wiretaps that the state prosecutor Alena (Táňa Pauhofová) allows him, he begins to uncover a seemingly banal and local case. It later turns out to be the biggest corruption scandal in Czech football history.

Parallel to Marek's investigation, the story follows never-ending struggle of the broken-down football manager Ivan. His only goal is to keep his Žižkov team in the first league. He is helped in this by the cunning and money-loving head of the referees' commission, Milan.

In addition to them, the story of football referee Irča unfolds. She discovers in a rather demanding, painful and often humiliating way that asserting oneself in a world dominated by men is a really hard job.

Štěstíčku naproti also tells story of a businessman Luboš, son of the president of the Hradiště club. His mission in life is to fulfill the football wish of his Slovak father in the hope that he will finally start to love him sincerely and truly.

== Cast ==
- Marek Daniel as Ivan Horník, manager of FK Viktoria Žižkov. Based on Ivan Horník.
- Václav Neužil as Marek Svoboda, police investigator. Based on Miroslav Buchta.
- Denisa Barešová as referee Irča. Based on Dagmar Damková.
- Jiří Vyorálek as Milan Hůla, Head of the Referees' Committee. Based on Milan Brabec.
- Richard Stanke as Old Kocka. Based on Miroslav Valenta.
- Andrej Polák as Luboš Kocka. Based on Ivo Valenta.
- Václav Kopta as Čestmír Kaplíř, Příbram mob boss who owns a football club. Based on Jaroslav Starka.
- Jiří Vyorálek as Milan Hůla, Head of the Referees' Committee. Based on Milan Brabec.
- Tatiana Pauhofová as Alena Berger - Richterová, prosecutor.
- Pavel Řezníček as Alan Cílek, football official and former referee. Based on Roman Berbr.
- Jan Kolařík as Chief of Brno anti-corruption unit
- Michal Dalecký as Pavel, policeman
- Robin Ferro as Laďa, policeman and amateur winemaker
- Tereza Dočkalová as Jitka, investigators' assistant
- Lucie Žáčková as Žaneta, queen of the cash register
- Jarmila Vlčková as gossip in the police office house
- Marek Pospíchal as referee Štěpán Kolaja. Based on Václav Zejda.
- Jan Plouhar as referee Tomáš Pavarec, AKA Pavarotti. Based on Lubomír Puček.
- Tomáš Jeřábek as Fanda, maintenance worker of the Žižkov playground
- Jan Hájek as policeman Vajnar, Sabina's father
- Terézie Hájková as Sabina Vajnarová, Marek's lover
- Petra Bučková as Petra Svobodová, Marek's wife
- Jakub Barták as Vojta Svoboda, Marek's son
- Tomáš Dastlík as Čestmír's bad man
- Aleš Bílík as Čestmír's bad man

== Episodes ==
Episode	Directed by	Written by	Original air date (Voyo)	Original air date (Nova)	Czech viewers (millions)
1	Marek Najbrt	Ondřej Gabriel, Tomáš Vávra	31 October 2025	TBA	
2	Marek Najbrt	Ondřej Gabriel, Tomáš Vávra	7 November 2025	TBA	
3	Marek Najbrt	Ondřej Gabriel, Tomáš Vávra	14 November 2025	TBA	
4	Marek Najbrt	Ondřej Gabriel, Tomáš Vávra	21 November 2025	TBA	
5	Marek Najbrt	Ondřej Gabriel, Tomáš Vávra	28 November 2025	TBA	
6	Marek Najbrt	Ondřej Gabriel, Tomáš Vávra	5 December 2025	TBA	
