= Vica Kerekes =

Slovak actress (born 1981)

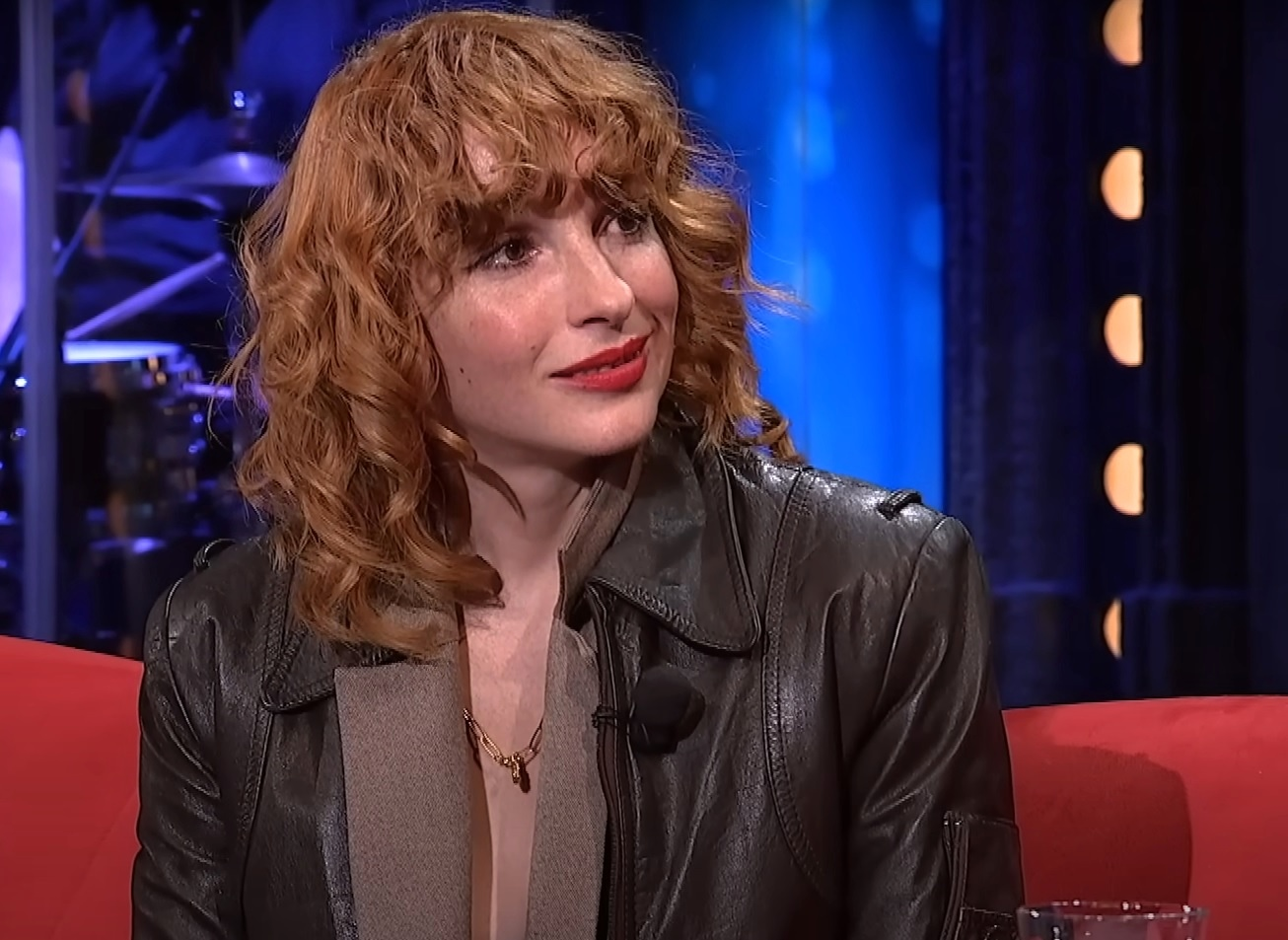
- Kerekes in 2024
- Born: Éva Kerekes; 28 March 1981 (age 45); Fiľakovo, Czechoslovakia
- Education: Academy of Performing Arts in Bratislava
- Occupation: Actress
- Years active: 2004–present
- Known for: Men in Hope
- Spouse: Csaba Vígh (m. 2011–2012)

Éva "Vica" Kerekes (born 28 March 1981) is a Slovak actress of Hungarian ethnicity. She is active in Slovakia, the Czech Republic, and Hungary. She is often referred to and credited as Vica Kerekésová, Vica Kerekešová, and Kerekes Vica. She adopted the nickname "Vica" to distinguish herself from the Hungarian actress Éva Kerekes.

== Early life and career ==
Vica Kerekes was born to ethnic Hungarian parents. In 2001, after studying at the Academy of Performing Arts in Bratislava, she moved to Budapest. She made her cinematic debut in 2004 with the Slovak film Konečná stanica. To international audiences, Kerekes is known for the 2011 film Men in Hope.

== Personal life ==
Kerekes divorced artist Csaba Vigh in 2012 after living with him for six years and being separated for a year. In 2014, she announced that she was in a relationship with tattoo artist Lukáš Musil.

== Awards and recognition ==
In 2010, Kerekes was awarded Best Actress at the Hungarian Film Week for her performance in Ki/Be Tawaret. In 2013, she was named Best Actress in Slovakia for her role in Seven Days of Sin. She is the winner of the 2017 Hungarian Film Award for Best Television Actress for her role in the television movie Tranzitidö.

== Selected filmography ==
=== Film ===
List of film appearances, with year, title, and role shown
Year	Title	Role	Notes
2004	Konečná stanica		Credited as Eva Kerekesová
2008	Shameless	Kočička	
2009	1	Maya Satin	
2009	Broken Promise	Jozefína	Credited as Eva Kerekesová
2011	Men in Hope	Šarlota	
2011	Ki/Be Tawaret	Fruzsi	
2012	Seven Days of Sin	Agnes	
2013	Příběh kmotra	Zuzana	
2013	Heavenly Shift		
2015	Mom and Other Loonies in the Family	Ilu	
2016	Angel of the Lord 2	Magdalena	
2017	Milada	Milada's sister Vera	
2020	Resistance	Mila	

=== Television ===
List of television appearances, with year, title, and role shown
Year	Title	Role	Notes
2009	Odsúdené	Anikó "Maďarka" Nagy	30 episodes
2014	Clona	Nikola Bárdyová	7 episodes
2016	Tranzitidö	Léna	Television movie
2017	Četníci z Luhačovic	Anna Vanková	5 episodes
2017	Kapitán Exner	Gabriela Stein	6 episodes
