= Seven Days of Sin =

2012 Czech historical drama film

- Film poster
- Czech: 7 dní hříchů
- Directed by: Jiří Chlumský
- Written by: Josef Urban
- Produced by: Daniel Krzywoň; Josef Urban
- Starring: Ondřej Vetchý; Jarek Hylebrant; Vica Kerekes; Jiří Schmitzer; Norbert Lichý; Igor Bareš; Attila Mokos; Fyodor Bondarchuk; Kostas Zerdaloglu; Anna Šišková; Katarína Kolajová; Karel Hlušička
- Cinematography: Ján Ďuriš; Martin Šec
- Edited by: Vasilis Skalenakis
- Music by: Boris Urbánek
- Production company: Nakladatelství Fragment
- Distributed by: Blue Sky
- Release date: 1 November 2012 (Czechia)
- Running time: 107 minutes
- Countries: Czechia; Slovakia
- Language: Czech
- Budget: 40 million KČ

Seven Days of Sin (Czech: 7 dní hříchů) is a 2012 Czech action historical drama film directed by Jiří Chlumský.

== Synopsis ==
Based on a true story set in the Sudetenland, an area of Czechoslovakia occupied by Nazi Germany, in the spring of 1945, the film begins with the wedding of forester Jan Olšan and his beloved Agnes. Their union is problematic due to the fact that Jan is Czech, and Agnes is German. Agnes's father and brother Jürgen both oppose the marriage, as they feel that by marrying a Czech, Agnes will dilute their pure German blood. As the war comes to an end and the area is liberated, Agnes is persecuted by the Czechs and goes missing. Jan and Jürgen go in search of her, and the former is eventually accused of collaborating with the Nazis.

=== Differences from real events ===
Except for Uvarov, all names in the story have been changed. The mixed marriage of Jan and Agnes is actually documented, and Marie's character has been modified: she was not Jan's lover but the wife of a man with whom Jan had a property dispute. The dialogue between Uvarov and Brachtl is based on a real written record. When writing the script, the author of the script, Josef Urban, mainly relied on the statements of Karel Cvrk, who worked in 1945 in Šumperk at the District National Committee.

== Cast ==
- Ondřej Vetchý as Jan Olšan
- Jarek Hylebrant as Jürgen Schreier
- Vica Kerekes as Agnes
- Jiří Schmitzer as Ditrich
- Norbert Lichý as Dohnal
- Igor Bareš as Lubomír Přikryl
- Attila Mokos as Brachtl
- Fyodor Bondarchuk as Uvarov
- Kostas Zerdaloglu as Bozděch
- Anna Šišková as Helga
- Katarína Kolajová as Marie
- Karel Hlušička as old Olšan

== Production ==
The film experienced a number of problems during filming, including snowstorms, floods, and injuries to Ondřej Vetchý.

== Home video ==
Seven Days of Sin was released on DVD and Blu-ray discs on 31 July 2013 in Czechia, and it became one of the first Czech films to be made available through the iTunes store.

== Accolades ==
The film received three nominations at the 2012 Czech Lion Awards: Best Cinematography (Ján Ďuriš), Best Actress in a Leading Role for Kerekes, and Best Actor in a Leading Role for Vetchý; it did not win any.
