= Trpaslík =

- Genre: Comedy
- Written by: Petr Kolečko; Jan Prušinovský
- Directed by: Jan Prušinovský
- Starring: Michal Suchánek, Marika Procházková, Martin Hofmann
- Country of origin: Czech Republic
- Original language: Czech
- No. of seasons: 1
- No. of episodes: 6

Production
- Running time: 40 minutes

Original release
- Network: Czech Television
- Release: January 2 – February 6, 2017

Trpaslík (Gnome) is a Czech comedy television series. The first episode was available as a preview on the Czech Television website on December 28, 2016, and was premiered on television from January 2, 2017. It was filmed in Nymburk.

== Cast ==
- Michal Suchánek as Jarda Staněk
- Marika Procházková as Katka Staňková
- Petr Mähring ad Jakub Šorm as Luděk Staněk
- Tereza Taliánová as Janička Staňková
- Martin Hofmann as Vladimír Novotný
- Milena Minichová as Pavlína Novotná
- Jana Šulcová as Mrs. Janáčková
- Petr Nárožný as Mr. Kutlák
- Martin Evžen Kyšperský as Petr Šoural
- Josef Abrhám as Václav Novotný
- Martin Myšička as Karas
- Nami Havelková as Jolanka Vanýsková
- Elizaveta Maximová as Irena Korytářová
- Ivana Lokajová as gravekeeper's wife
- Michal Isteník as policeman
- Alžběta Vaculčiaková as Jolana's best friend
- Eva Leinweberová as teacher
- Jiří Bábek as headmaster
- Lukáš Bech as gravekeeper
