= Okresní přebor =

Czech sport comedy television series

- Genre: Comedy
- Created by: Jan Prušinovský
- Starring: Ondřej Vetchý; David Novotný; Luděk Sobota; Tatiana Vilhelmová; Leoš Noha; Jaroslava Pokorná
- Country of origin: Czech Republic
- Original language: Czech
- No. of seasons: 1
- No. of episodes: 16

Production
- Executive producer: Ondřej Zima
- Running time: 25 minutes

Original release
- Network: TV Nova
- Release: 2010

Okresní přebor (District League in English) is a Czech sport comedy television series created by Jan Prušinovský that airs on TV Nova. The series premiered on 6 September 2010.

== Plot ==
Stories revolving around the small TJ Slavoj Houslice football team in the fictitious Czech village of Houslice.

== Production ==
Filming started in February 2009 in the village of Lochovice.

Because of the series' excellent ratings, in 2011 TV Nova decide to shoot a feature-length film based on the series.

== Cast and characters ==
=== Main ===
- Ondřej Vetchý as Jirka Luňák a.k.a. Jiřina
- David Novotný as Jarda Kužel
- Luděk Sobota as Václav Orel
- Leoš Noha as Adolf Větvička a.k.a. Áda
- Pavel Kikinčuk as Ludvík Hovorka a.k.a. Ludva
- Jaroslava Pokorná as Antonie Hnátková
- Tatiana Vilhelmová as Ilona
- Pavel Nečas - as Luboš Matějka

=== Recurring ===
- Ladislav Hampl as Jarmil Hubáček
- Martin Bao as Fun Din Dung

== Episodes ==
No.	Title	Directed by	Written by	Original release date
1	"Pohřeb"	Jan Prušinovský	Jan Prušinovský	September 6, 2010
The old coach of TJ Slavoj Houslice is dead. The team has to start looking for new one.
2	"Nábor"	Jan Prušinovský	Jan Prušinovský & Petr Kolečko	September 13, 2010
The team needs new players. But where to find them?
3	"Fanynka"	Jan Prušinovský	Jan Prušinovský & Petr Kolečko	September 20, 2010
The team has a new fan. But she only causes trouble.
4	"Jesle"	Jan Prušinovský	Jan Prušinovský & Petr Kolečko	September 27, 2010
The key player of the team is having psychological problems. The team must find a way to make it right.
5	"Forbes"	Jakub Kohák	Jan Prušinovský	October 4, 2010
The Team cashier play away all the club-money in a slot machines. The team members decide to steal the slot machine to get their money back.
6	"Lucka"	Jan Prušinovský	Jan Prušinovský & Petr Kolečko	October 11, 2010
Lucka is a daughter of Jirka. She was a good player in women's football, but now she has stopped playing and wants to be a model.
7	"Kopačák"	Jan Prušinovský	Jan Prušinovský & Petr Kolečko	October 18, 2010
8	"Schůze"	Jan Prušinovský	Jan Prušinovský & Petr Kolečko	October 25, 2010
9	"Na váhu"	Jan Prušinovský	Jan Prušinovský	November 1, 2010
10	"Jaro"	Jan Prušinovský	Jan Prušinovský & Petr Kolečko	November 8, 2010
11	"Konvoj"	Jakub Kohák	Jan Prušinovský & Petr Kolečko	November 15, 2010
12	"Láska"	Jan Prušinovský	Jan Prušinovský	November 22, 2010
13	"Inseminátor"	Jan Prušinovský	Jan Prušinovský & Petr Kolečko	November 29, 2010
14	"Derby"	Jan Prušinovský	Jan Prušinovský	December 6, 2010
15	"Svatba"	Jan Prušinovský	Jan Prušinovský	December 13, 2010
16	"Návštěva z kraje"	Jan Prušinovský	Jan Prušinovský	December 20, 2010

== Ratings ==
The first episode got a high rating of 1,600,000 viewers and a 53.27% share.
