= Sunday League – Pepik Hnatek's Final Match =

- Film poster
- Czech: Okresní přebor – Poslední zápas Pepika Hnátka
- Directed by: Jan Prušinovský
- Written by: Jan Prušinovský; Petr Kolečko
- Produced by: Misu Predescu; Petr Erben; Jan Maxa
- Starring: Miroslav Krobot; Ondřej Vetchý
- Cinematography: Petr Bednář
- Edited by: Otakar Šenovský
- Music by: 2Mouchy; Vratislav Kydlíček; Jan P. Muchow
- Distributed by: Bontonfilm
- Release date: 29 March 2012
- Running time: 1h 44min
- Country: Czech Republic
- Language: Czech

Sunday League – Pepik Hnatek's Final Match (Czech: Okresní přebor – Poslední zápas Pepika Hnátka) is a 2012 Czech comedy film directed by Jan Prušinovský. It is a prequel to Sunday League TV series.

== Cast ==
- Miroslav Krobot as Pepik Hnátek
- Ondřej Vetchý as Jirka Luňák
- David Novotný as Jarda Kužel
- Jaroslav Plesl as Lojza
- Luděk Sobota as Václav Orel
- Jaroslava Pokorná as Antonie Hnátková
