= Simona Monyová =

Czech writer

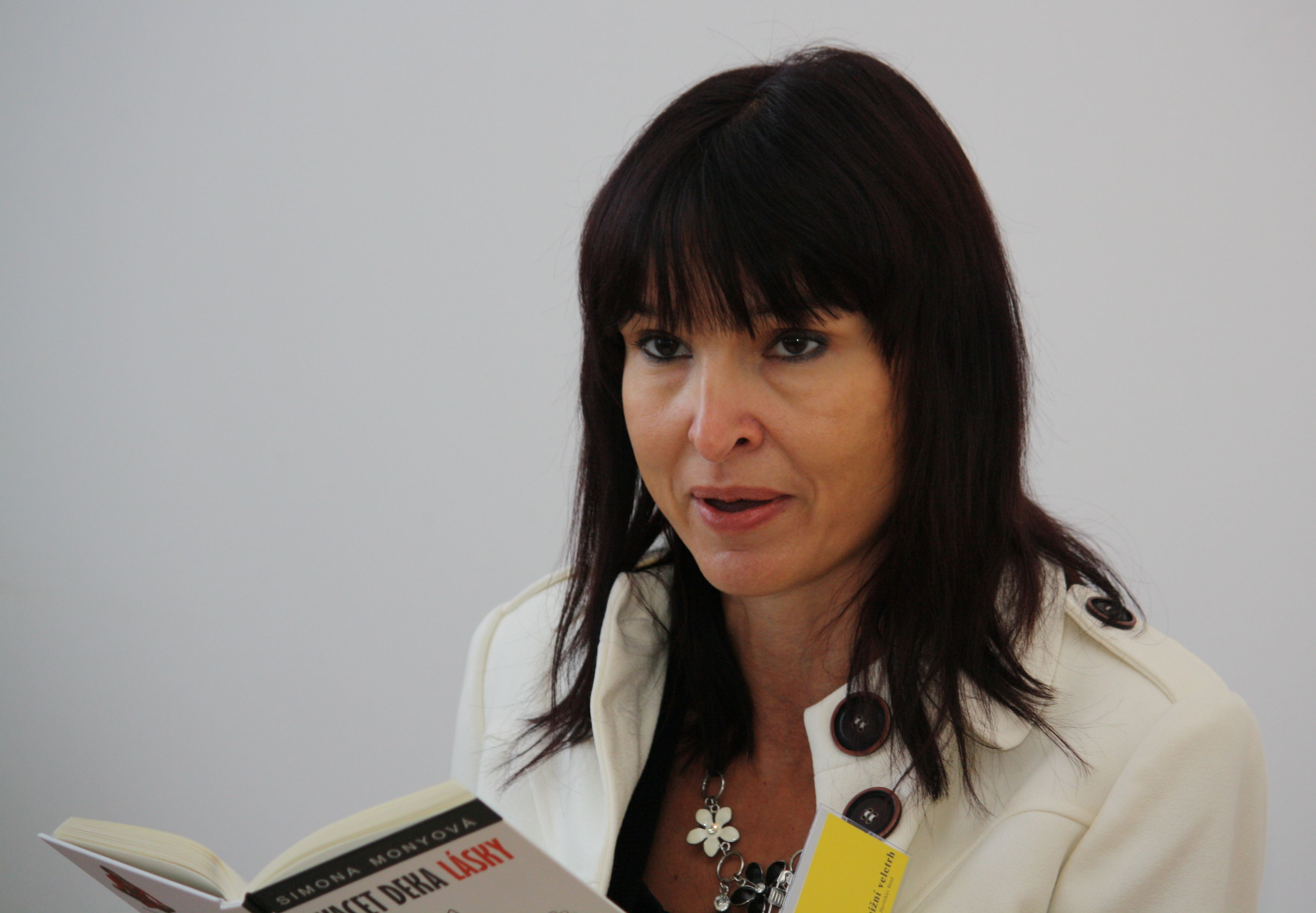
Simona Monyová in 2010

Simona Monyová (17 March 1967 – 3 August 2011) was a Czech novelist. She wrote more than 20 books and was a bestselling author in the Czech Republic. On 3 August 2011 she was found dead in her house. The police suspected her husband, Boris Ingr, was the murderer, as there was a history of domestic abuse. He was later convicted and sentenced to 15 years in prison. The sentence was upheld by the Supreme Court in 2013.
