= Most! =

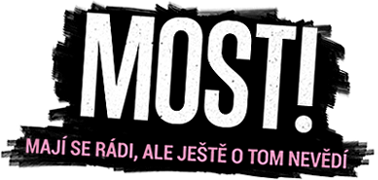
- Genre: Comedy
- Written by: Petr Kolečko; Jan Prušinovský
- Directed by: Jan Prušinovský
- Starring: Martin Hofmann; Zdeněk Godla
- Country of origin: Czech Republic
- Original language: Czech
- No. of seasons: 1
- No. of episodes: 8

Production
- Running time: 37-49 minutes

Original release
- Network: Czech Television
- Release: January 7 – February 25, 2019

Most! is a Czech comedy TV series. It was made in collaboration between Petr Kolečko and Jan Prušinovský. It was their sixth work.

The series premiered on 2 May 2018 at the Serial Killer Festival. The first episode of the series was introduced on 29 November 2018. The series premiered on 7 January 2019.The last episode was broadcast on 25 February the same year.

The premiere of the last episode of this show was watched by 1.61 million people, making it the most successful series on Czech Television in more than the last five years. The premiere of the first episode had a viewership of 1.3 million viewers, with the number of viewers increasing with each episode. Other viewers also watched the show on the Internet. The series had the highest viewership among the 30- to 44-year-old group, as well as among the 15- to 29-year-old audience group.

== Plot ==
The story takes place in city of Most located in North Bohemia. Rather limited hero lives there - loser Luděk Říha. He loses his job thanks to his racist remarks. He lives in a dilapidated shack, owes money everywhere and has problems with his ex-wife and son. Luděk goes to Severka pub tor run from his problems but he is visited by postman Ondra from the program Pošta pro tebe. Luděk decides to present main problems bothering inhabitants of Most but he meets his sister Dáša, who was formerly his brother Pavel, and they argue. They leave TV together and later that night they win a secret race together. Daša eventually moves in with Luďek in their father's house.

== Cast ==
- Martin Hofmann as Luděk Říha known as Luďan
- Zdeněk Godla as Franta Gondek, Roma worker of town services
- Michal Isteník as Eda, owner of Severka restaurant
- Vladimír Škultéty as Ivan Čočka known as Čočkin
- Cyril Drozda as Květoslav Toman
- Erika Stárková as Dáša Říhová (formerly Pavel Říha), Luděk's transgender sibling
  - voiced by Jan Cina
- Filip František Červenka as Tonda Říha
- Jitka Čvančarová as Ilona, Luďan's ex-wife
- Jiří Schmitzer as Karel Juliš
- Taťjana Medvecká as Julišová,
- Jan Řezníček as David Juliš
- Leoš Noha as Roman Vepřek
- Klaudia Dudová as Žaneta

== Episodes ==
No.	Title	Directed by	Written by	Original release date	Czech viewers (millions)
1	"Episode 1"	Jan Prušinovský	Petr Kolečko	January 7, 2019	1.308
2	"Episode 2"	Jan Prušinovský	Petr Kolečko	January 14, 2019	1.258
3	"Episode 3"	Jan Prušinovský	Petr Kolečko	January 21, 2019	1.355
4	"Episode 4"	Jan Prušinovský	Petr Kolečko	January 28, 2019	1.457
5	"Episode 5"	Jan Prušinovský	Petr Kolečko	February 4, 2019	1.527
6	"Episode 6"	Jan Prušinovský	Petr Kolečko	February 11, 2019	1.675
7	"Episode 7"	Jan Prušinovský	Petr Kolečko	February 18, 2019	1.702
8	"Episode 8"	Jan Prušinovský	Petr Kolečko	February 25, 2019	1.610

== Production ==
Most! was mostly created in a real environments of the eponymous location, namely in restaurants Severka and U Kalendů, at the autodrome, Cascade hotel, the city hospital, Central shopping center, the Church of the Assumption of the Virgin Mary, the local library or in Obrnice-Chanov. During the 65-day preparation of the series, no less than 821 members of the extras performed in it.

== Hungarian remake ==
Hungarian TV series A Nagy Fehér Főnök (The Big White Boss) is a Hungarian remake set in the town of Kazincbarcika in the county of Borsod-Abaúj-Zemplén in the northeast of the country; the location was chosen because it has common features with the North Bohemian one.
