= Ondřej Vetchý =

Czech actor (born 1962)

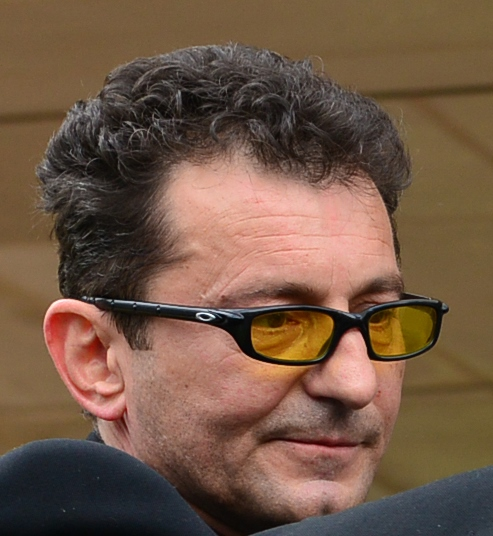
- Ondřej Vetchý in 2014
- Born: 16 May 1962 (age 63); Jihlava, Czechoslovakia
- Occupation: Actor
- Years active: 1978–present

Ondřej Vetchý (born 16 May 1962) is a Czech actor. He is a member of The Drama Club (DC) in Prague.

== Filmography ==
=== Films ===
- 1985 – Janek in Give the Devil his Due
- 1988 – Dan in Dům pro dva (nomination for European Film Award for Best Young Actor or Actress)
- 1991 – Arnošt in The Territory of White Deer
- 1995 – Bajnyš Zisovič in Valley of Exile
- 1996 – Brož in Kolya
- 1997 – Kvido's Father in Those Wonderful Years That Sucked
- 2001 – František Sláma in Dark Blue World
- 2009 – Broken Promise
- 2009 – Jan Pavel in An Earthly Paradise for the Eyes
- 2010 – Jirka Luňák aka Jiřina in Okresní přebor
- 2011 – Tomáš in Innocence
- 2012 – Jirka Luňák in Sunday League – Pepik Hnatek's Final Match (Czech Lion for Best Supporting Actor)
- 2013 – Elli in Colette
- 2014 – František Vedral in Příběh kmotra
- 2016 - Stuck with a Perfect Woman
- 2017 – Barefoot
- 2018 – My Uncle Archimedes
- 2019 – Women on the Run
- 2020 – Betrayer
- 2022 – Medieval
- 2025 – violinist Josef Šťastný in Sea of Hope

=== Dubbing ===
- 1999 – Vincent van Gogh in Vincent by Gordon Smith, Divadlo Ungelt
- 2000 – Samson Martin - Kennedy Phillips in Wild Spring by Arnold Wesker, Divadlo Ungelt
- 2002 – Count Paolo Grazia in Mask and The Face by Luigi Chiarelli, DC
- 2004 – Carluccio in The Businessman from Smyrna by Carlo Goldoni, DC
- 2005 – Katurian in The Pillowman, DC

== Honours ==
- Medal of Merit (2024)
- Arnošt Lustig Award (2025)
