= Heavenly Shift =

2013 Hungarian comedy film

- Film poster
- Hungarian: Isteni müszak
- Directed by: Márk Bodzsár
- Written by: Márk Bodzsár
- Produced by: István Bodzsár; Ágota Varga
- Starring: András Ötvös; Roland Rába; Keresztes Tamás
- Cinematography: Dániel Reich
- Edited by: Zoltán Kovács
- Music by: Gábor Keresztes
- Production companies: Sparks; Unio Film
- Distributed by: A Company Hungary Kft.
- Release date: 24 October 2013 (Hungary)
- Running time: 100 minutes
- Country: Hungary
- Language: Hungarian

Heavenly Shift (Hungarian: Isteni műszak) is a 2013 Hungarian dark comedy film by Márk Bodzsár, in his directorial debut.

== Synopsis ==
Milán, a young refugee from the Yugoslav Wars, escapes to Hungary in 1992, leaving his Bosnian bride behind. By chance, he meets Fék and Tamás, two paramedics who are making money on the side by selling identities of the dead people they transport. They recruit Milán, who uses the money to try to bring his fiancée, Tánya, out of the disintegrating Yugoslavia.

== Cast ==
- András Ötvös as Milán
- Roland Rába as Fék
- Keresztes Tamás as Tamás
- Natasa Stork as Tánya
- Sándor Zsótér as Vinnai
- Géza D. Hegedüs as Dr. Oppenheim
- Hanna Pálos as Terike
- Zsolt Trill as Szőke Kóla
