= In the Shadow (2012 film) =

2012 Czech crime film

- Film poster
- Directed by: David Ondříček
- Written by: Marek Epstein; Misha Votruba; David Ondříček
- Starring: Ivan Trojan
- Cinematography: Adam Sikora
- Edited by: Michal Lánsky
- Music by: Jan P. Muchow; Michal Novinski
- Release date: 13 September 2012
- Running time: 106 minutes
- Country: Czech Republic
- Language: Czech

In the Shadow (Czech: Ve stínu) is a 2012 Czech crime film directed by David Ondříček. The film was selected as the Czech entry for the Best Foreign Language Oscar at the 85th Academy Awards, but it did not make the final shortlist.

== Cast ==
- Ivan Trojan as Captain Hakl
- Sebastian Koch as Major Zenke
- Soňa Norisová as Jitka
- Jiří Štěpnička as Pánek
- David Švehlík as Beno
- Marek Taclík as Bareš
- Filip Antonio as Tom
- Martin Myšička as Jílek
- Miroslav Krobot as Kirsch
- Halka Třešňáková as translator
- Simona Babčáková as researcher

== Awards ==
In the Shadow won nine Czech Lions at the 2012 awards.

== See also ==
- List of submissions to the 85th Academy Awards for Best Foreign Language Film
- List of Czech submissions for the Academy Award for Best Foreign Language Film
