= Soňa Norisová =

Slovak actress and singer

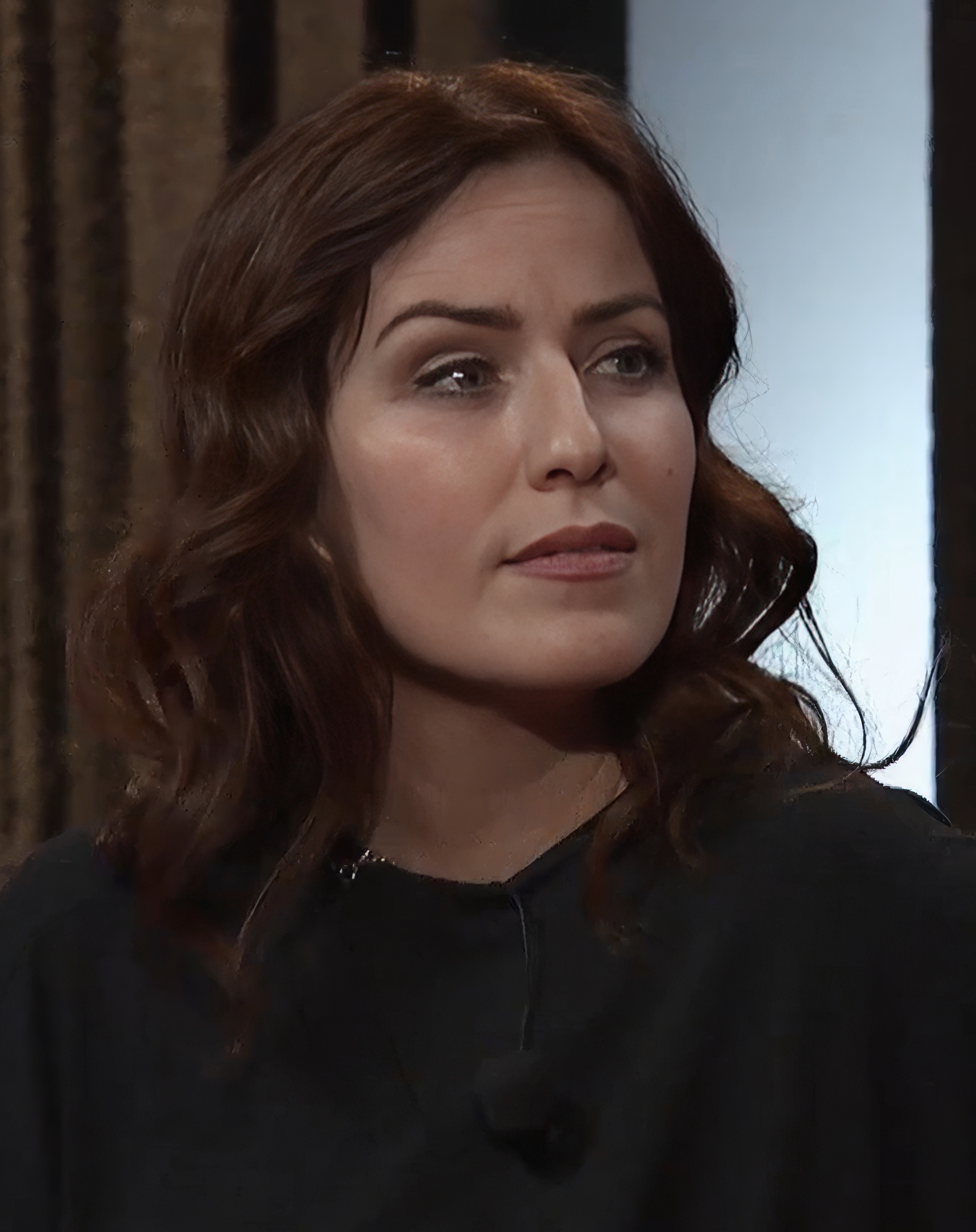
- Born: 27 August 1973 (age 52); Malacky, Czechoslovakia
- Occupation: Actress
- Years active: 1994-present

Soňa Norisová (born 27 August 1973) is a Slovak actress and singer. She received a nomination for Best Actress at the 2014 Sun in a Net Awards for her performance in the 2012 film In the Shadow (Slovak: V tieni). Her younger sister, Zuzana Norisová, is also an actress. They acted together in the 2001 film Rebelové.

== Selected filmography ==
- Rebelové (2001)
- Václav (2007)
- Mesto tieňov (television, 2008)
- In the Shadow (2012)
