= Smrčná =

- Municipality
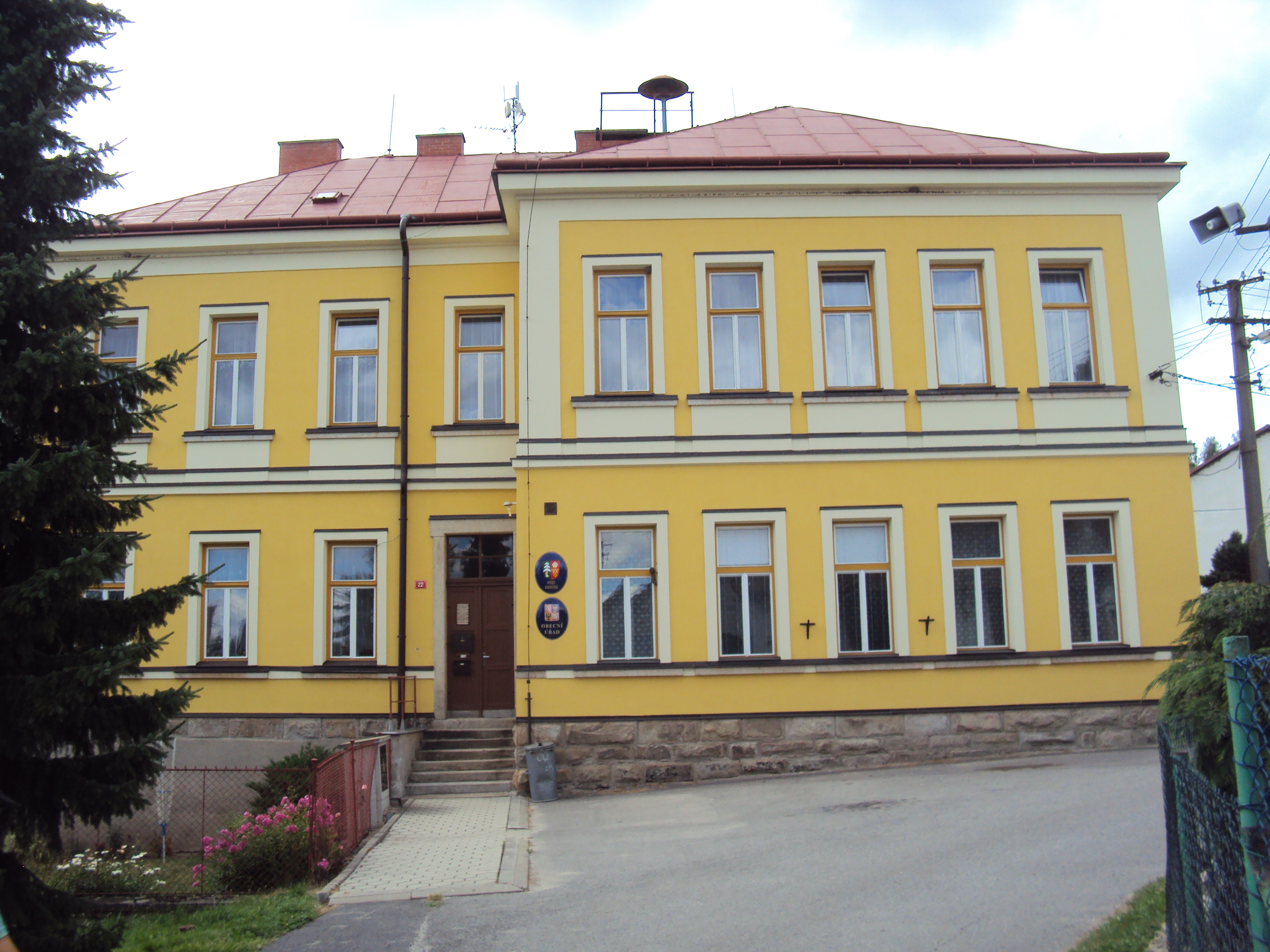
- Municipal office, formerly a German school

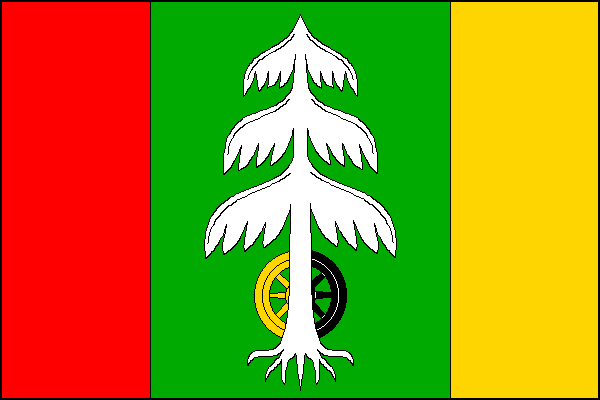
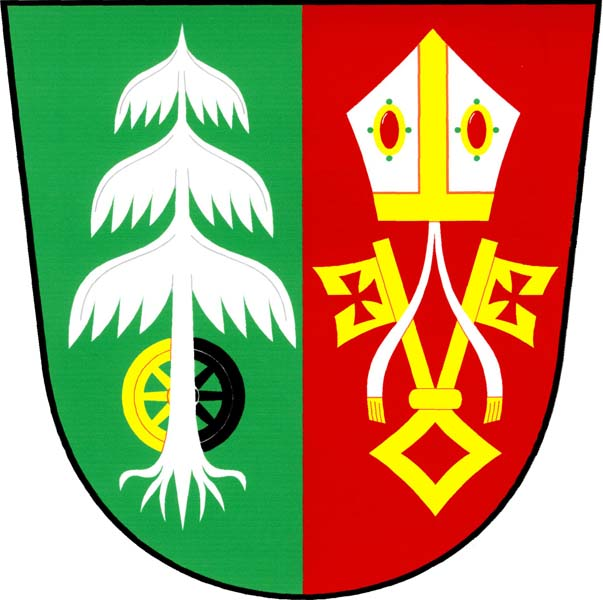
- Flag Coat of arms

- Location in the Czech Republic
- Coordinates: 49°28′17″N 15°32′16″E
- Country: Czech Republic
- Region: Vysočina
- District: Jihlava
- First mentioned: 1233

Area
  - Total: 12.37 km^{2} (4.78 sq mi)
- Elevation: 584 m (1,916 ft)

Population (2026-01-01)
  - Total: 489
  - Density: 39.5/km^{2} (102/sq mi)
- Time zone: UTC+1 (CET)
  - Summer (DST): UTC+2 (CEST)
- Postal code: 588 01
- Website: www.smrcna.cz

Smrčná (Czech pronunciation: [ˈsmr̩tʃnaː]; German: Simmersdorf) is a municipality and village in Jihlava District in the Vysočina Region of the Czech Republic. It has about 500 inhabitants.

Smrčná lies approximately 9 kilometres (6 mi) north-west of Jihlava and 106 km (66 mi) south-east of Prague.

== History ==
The first written mention of Smrčná is from 1233.

== Demographics ==
Historical population
Year	Pop.	±%
1869	886	—
1880	839	−5.3%
1890	814	−3.0%
1900	883	+8.5%
1910	991	+12.2%
1921	915	−7.7%
1930	728	−20.4%
1950	424	−41.8%
1961	469	+10.6%
1970	390	−16.8%
1980	345	−11.5%
1991	296	−14.2%
2001	296	+0.0%
2011	354	+19.6%
2021	455	+28.5%
Source: Censuses
