= Martin Hub =

Czech character actor (born 1964)

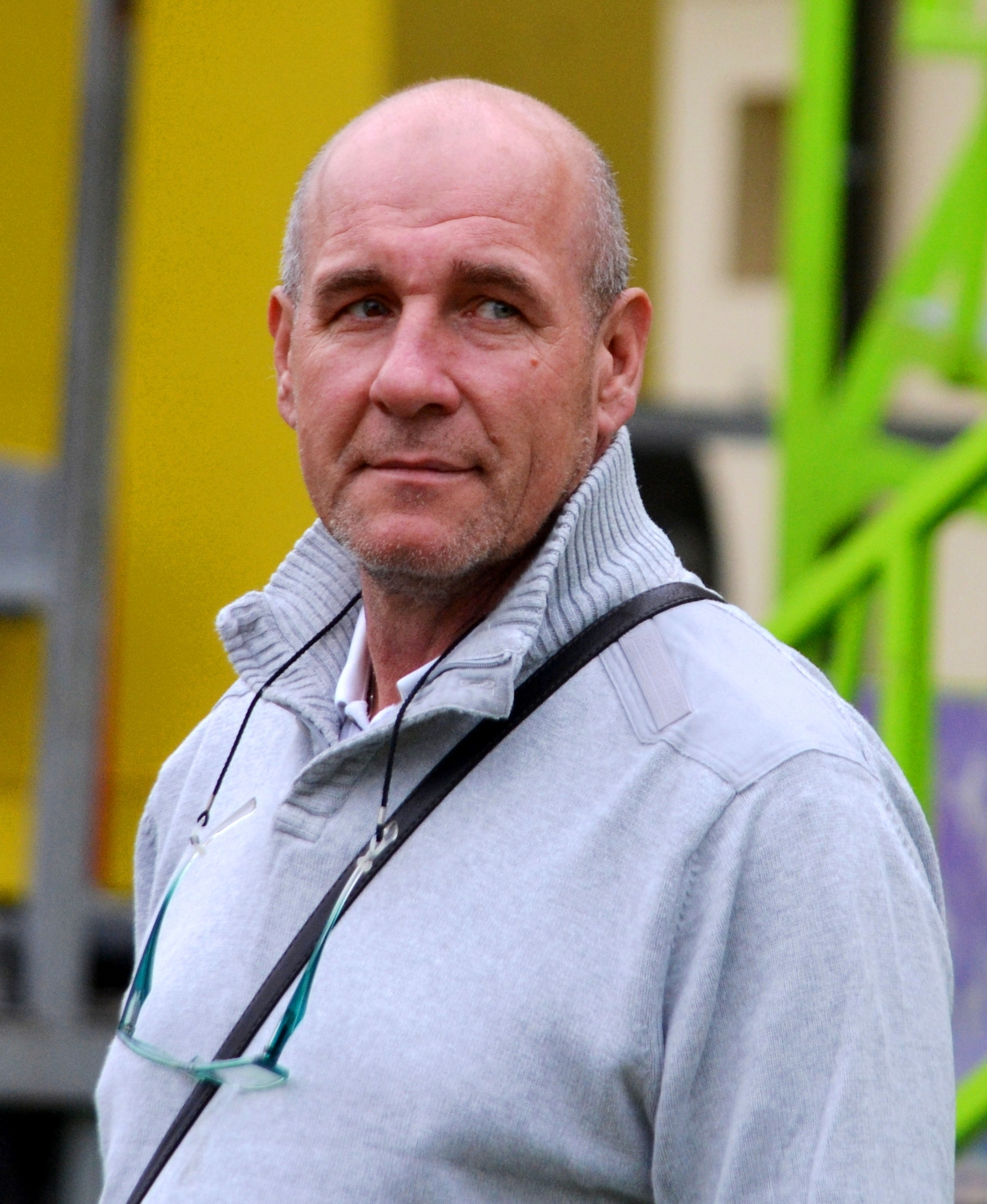
- Hub in 2014
- Born: 13 March 1964 (age 62); Prague, Czechoslovakia
- Occupations: Actor, stuntman
- Years active: 1986–present
- Children: 2

Martin Hub (born 13 March 1964) is a Czech character actor, best known for his portrayals of immigrants with broken English, soldiers, secret agents and bodyguards. As a professional stuntman, he is best known for his work in James Cameron's Titanic, Saving Private Ryan, and Gladiator.

== Life and career ==
A lifelong native of the Prague, in high school Hub was an active athlete, playing football and handball, threw javelin, balls, disk, and boxing. He attended the Czech stunt school, Jaroslav Toms, and made his film debut in Field Field in 1986. He later appeared in such blockbuster movies as Titanic, playing a non-English speaking Slovak father who goes down with the ship with his son in his arms, a Czech soldier in Saving Private Ryan, and was Russell Crowe's official stuntman in Gladiator. Hub acts in the stunt group of Filmka and coordinates and teaches stunts professionally.

== Filmography ==
- Cool Runnings (1993) – Czech Bobsled Driver
- Titanic (1997) – Slovak Father
- Saving Private Ryan (1998) – Czech Wehrmacht Soldier
- Hannibal Rising (2007) – Lothar
- Life is Life (2015) – Pirate
- Pěstírna (2017) – Šembera
