= Gabriela Míčová =

Czech actress

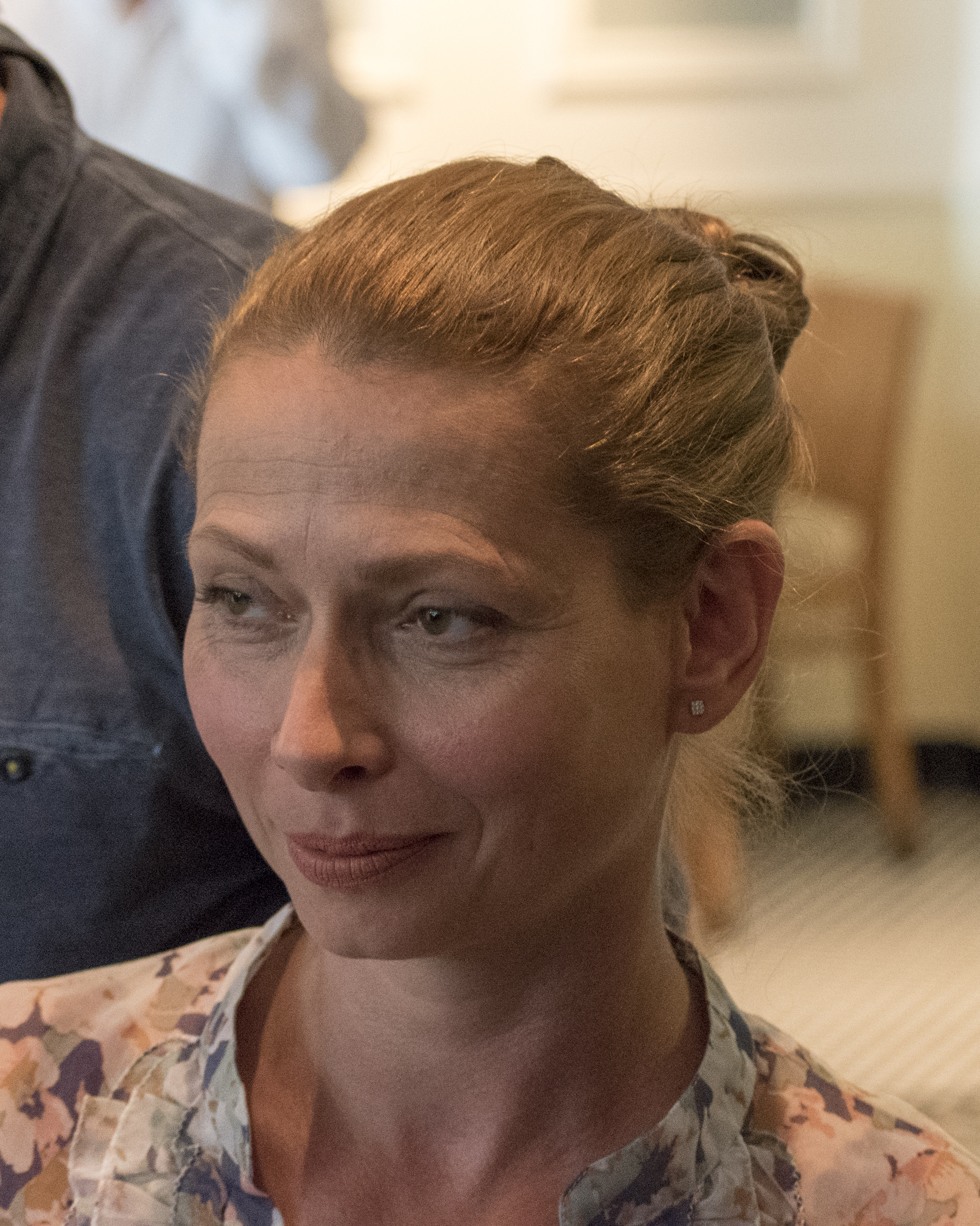
- Míčová in 2017
- Born: 25 February 1975 (age 50); Prostějov, Czechoslovakia
- Occupation: Actress
- Years active: 1999–present

Gabriela Míčová (born 25 February 1975) is a Czech actress. She won the Czech Lion award for Best Actress in 2012 for her role in the film Odpad město smrt. At the 2012 Thalia Awards she won the category of Best Actress in a Play.
