= Oleško =

- Municipality
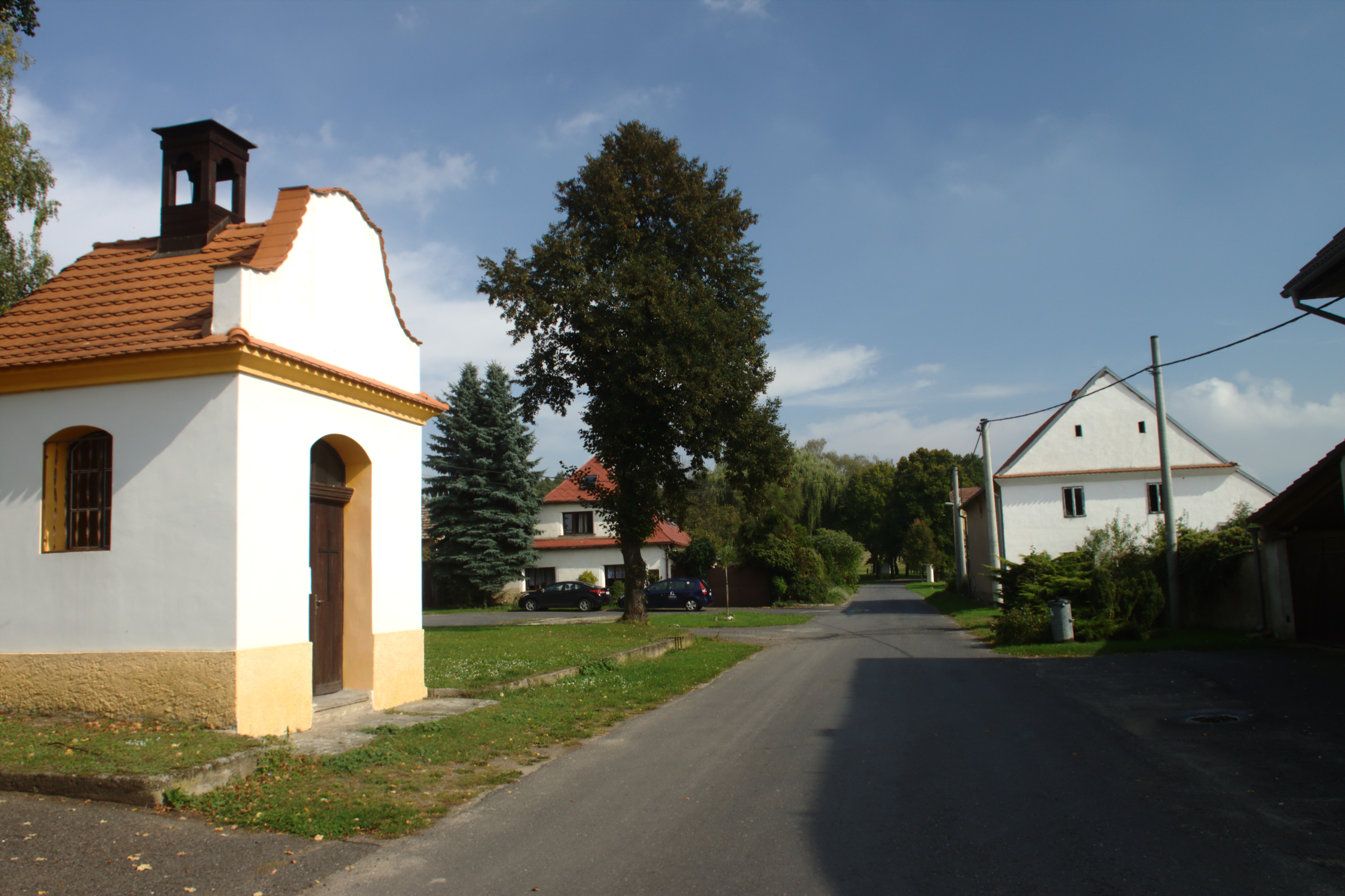
- Chapel of Saint Wenceslaus

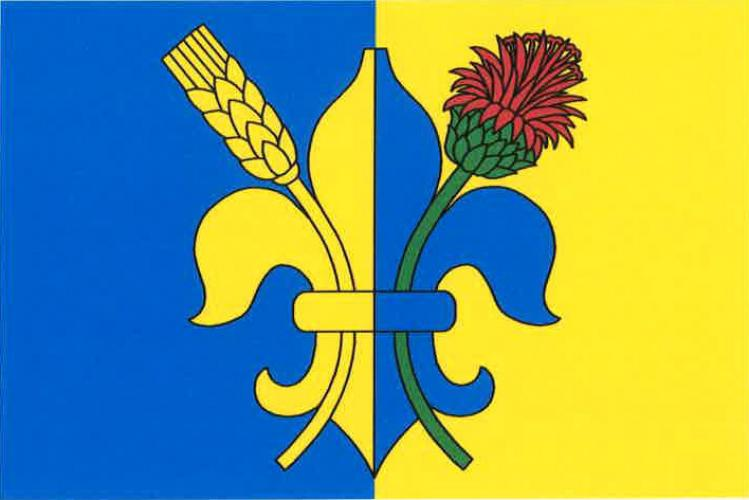
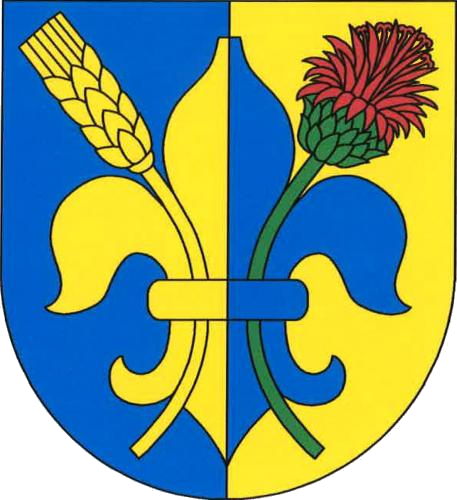
- Flag Coat of arms

- Location in the Czech Republic
- Coordinates: 50°28′50″N 14°11′48″E
- Country: Czech Republic
- Region: Ústí nad Labem
- District: Litoměřice
- First mentioned: 1226

Area
  - Total: 3.27 km^{2} (1.26 sq mi)
- Elevation: 163 m (535 ft)

Population (2026-01-01)
  - Total: 101
  - Density: 30.9/km^{2} (80.0/sq mi)
- Time zone: UTC+1 (CET)
  - Summer (DST): UTC+2 (CEST)
- Postal code: 412 01
- Website: www.olesko.cz

Oleško is a municipality and village in Litoměřice District in the Ústí nad Labem Region of the Czech Republic. It has about 100 inhabitants.

Oleško lies approximately 8 kilometres (5 mi) south-east of Litoměřice, 23 km (14 mi) south-east of Ústí nad Labem, and 48 km (30 mi) north of Prague.

== Demographics ==
Historical population
Year	Pop.	±%
1869	139	—
1880	144	+3.6%
1890	128	−11.1%
1900	148	+15.6%
1910	183	+23.6%
1921	174	−4.9%
1930	189	+8.6%
1950	146	−22.8%
1961	132	−9.6%
1970	153	+15.9%
1980	99	−35.3%
1991	86	−13.1%
2001	85	−1.2%
2011	86	+1.2%
2021	100	+16.3%
Source: Censuses
