= Petra Hřebíčková =

Czech actress

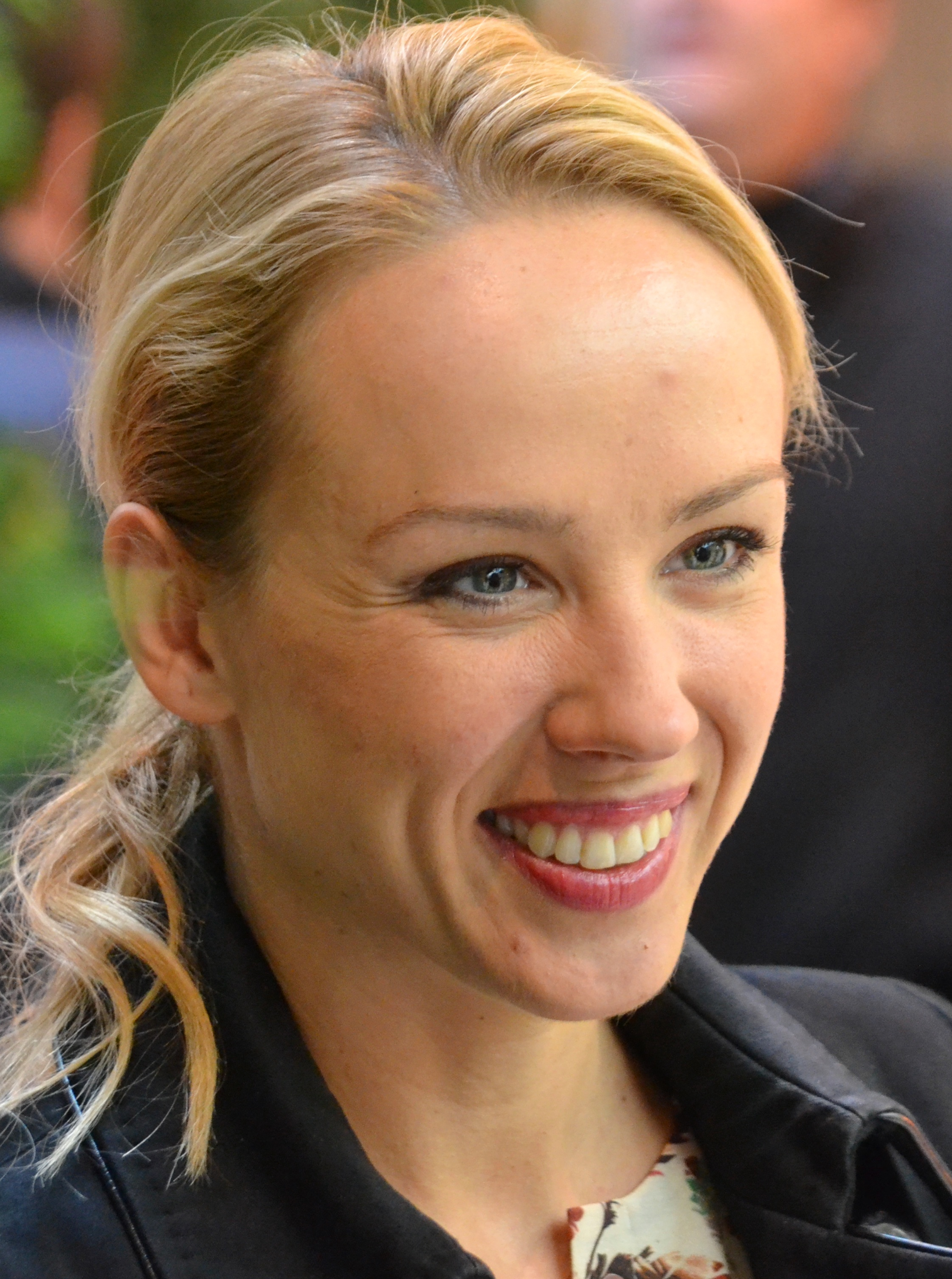
- Hřebíčková in 2014
- Born: 20 September 1979 (age 46); Hodonín, Czech Republic
- Occupation: Actress
- Years active: 2000–present

Petra Hřebíčková (born 20 September 1979) is a Czech stage and film actress. Her film debut was in the 2006 comedy I Served the King of England. On stage, she acted for six years at the Zlín City Theatre between 2003 and 2009, during which time she was named the Best Actress in a Play at the 2008 Thalia Awards. Following her Thalia award, she has appeared in television series and films including Kawasaki's Rose (2009) and Men in Hope (2011). Since 2010 she has been a regular member of the theatre at Prague's Švandovo divadlo.

== Career ==
Hřebíčková studied at the Janáček Academy of Music and Performing Arts (JAMU) in Brno, graduating in 2002. She had her first theatrical engagement at Divadlo Polárka in Brno. She then joined the Zlín City Theatre in 2003, her first role being a princess in the play Bajaja by Otomar Dvořák.

She made her film debut in 2006, appearing in I Served the King of England, directed by Jiří Menzel. At the 2008 Thalia Awards she won the category of Best Actress in a Play, for her performance of the title role in a production of Maryša at the Zlín City Theatre. Months after winning the Thalia award, Hřebíčková left Zlín City Theatre.

In 2009, she appeared in the film Kawasaki's Rose, in which director Jan Hřebejk blended comedy, drama, complicated family dynamics, and Czechoslovakia's secret police. In 2011, she appeared as Alica, in Jiří Vejdělek's Men in Hope, a comedic response to Ženy v pokušení.

Hřebíčková joined Švandovo divadlo in Prague in 2010. She was nominated for a Thalia award again in 2014, for her role of Gertrude in the performance of Hamlet at Švandovo divadlo, but the award was won by Vilma Cibulková.

== Personal life ==
In July 2015 Hřebíčková gave birth to a son, Šimon, whose father is her boyfriend actor Matěj Dadák. Hřebíčková took maternity leave in 2015 for the birth of her first child, but returned to work after just two months.

== Filmography ==
=== Films ===
Year	Title	Role	Notes
2006	I Served the King of England	Jaruska	
2009	Changes	partnerka	
2009	Kawasaki's Rose	Radka	
2011	Men in Hope	Alice	
2014	Intimity		
2016	Stuck with a Perfect Woman	Eliška	
2016	Všetko alebo nič	Sister-in-law	

=== Television ===
Year	Title	Role	Notes
2009	Guardian of Souls	Irena	1 episode
2009	Sněžná noc	Lena	TV film
2010	Kriminálka Anděl		1 episode
2010	Ulice	Pavla Rambousková	1 episode
2011	4teens	telocvikárka Jezková	5 episodes
2012	Innocent Lies	Lenka	1 episode
2012	Helena	Klára Brázdová	28 episodes
2013	Škoda lásky	Dominika	1 episode
2014	Případy 1. oddělení	Andrea Skopcová	13 episodes
2014	Svatby v Benátkách	Olga Drozdová	79 episodes
2015	Přístav	Olga Pivodová	25 episodes

=== Video games ===
Year	Title	Voice role	Notes
2010	Mafia II	Francesca Scaletta	Czech dubbing
2025	Mafia: The Old Country	Valentina Trapani	Czech dubbing
