= Jan Prušinovský =

Czech director and screenwriter (born 1979)

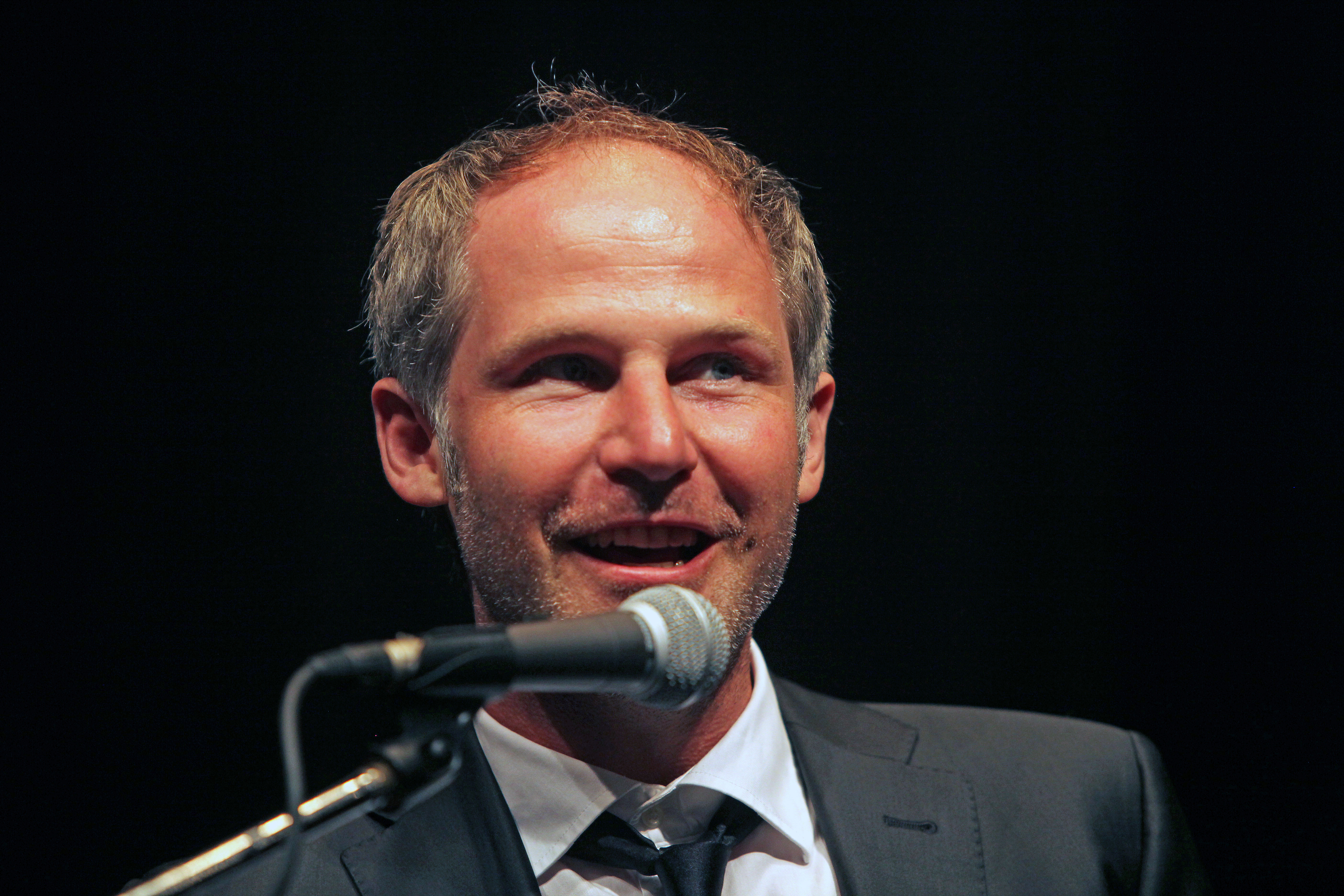
- Prušinovský at the 50th Karlovy Vary International Film Festival in 2015
- Born: July 3, 1979 (age 46); Hořovice, Czechoslovakia
- Occupation(s): director, screenwriter
- Years active: 2006–present

Jan Prušinovský (Czech pronunciation: [ˈjan ˈpruʃɪnovskiː]) (born 3 July 1979) is a Czech director and screenwriter.

In 2013, he was nominated for Czech Lion award as Best Director for Okresní přebor – Poslední zápas Pepika Hnátka, which was nominated as the Czech Best Film. He won Czech Lion Awards as Best Director for The Snake Brothers (Kobry a užovky) in 2016, which won Best Czech Film.

== Filmography ==
- 2005: Nejlepší je pěnivá, student film
- 2006: Rafťáci, screenwriter
- 2008: František je děvkař, screenwriter and director
- 2010: Okresní přebor, TV series – screenwriter and director
- 2012: Okresní přebor – Poslední zápas Pepika Hnátka, screenwriter and director
- 2014: Čtvrtá hvězda, TV series
- 2015: The Snake Brothers
- 2015: Autobazar Monte Karlo, series
- 2016: Trpaslík, TV series
- 2018: Život je hra, series
- 2019: Všechno je jinak, series
- 2019: Most!, TV series
- 2021: Mistakes
- 2022: Grand Prix
- 2023–2024: Dobré ráno, Brno!, TV series
