= 2010 Czech Lion Awards =

Czech film award ceremony

18th Czech Lion Awards
- Date: March 5, 2011
- Site: Rudolfinum, Prague
- Hosted by: Jakub Žáček and Marek Daniel

Highlights
- Best Picture: Walking Too Fast
- Best Actor: Ondřej Malý; Walking Too Fast
- Best Actress: Zuzana Bydžovská; Mamas & Papas
- Best Supporting Actor: Vladimír Dlouhý; Kajínek
- Best Supporting Actress: Eliška Balzerová; Women in Temptation
- Most awards: Walking Too Fast (5)
- Most nominations: Walking Too Fast (13)

Television coverage
- Network: Česká televize

2010 Czech Lion Awards ceremony was held on 5 March 2011.

== Winners and nominees ==
Best Film	Best Director
Walking Too Fast; Habermann; Kooky; Largest of the Czechs; Identity Card	Radim Špaček – Walking Too Fast; Jan Svěrák – Kooky; Robert Sedláček – Largest of the Czechs; Ondřej Trojan – Identity Card; Jan Švankmajer – Surviving Life
Best Actor in a Leading Role	Best Actress in a Leading Role
Ondřej Malý – Walking Too Fast; Karel Roden – Habermann; Konstantin Lavroněnko – Kajínek; Jaroslav Plesl – Largest of the Czechs; Martin Myšička – Identity Card	Zuzana Bydžovská – Mamas & Papas; Simona Babčáková – Largest of the Czechs; Anna Geislerová – Identity Card; Kristína Farkašová – Walking Too Fast; Lenka Vlasáková – Women in Temptation
Best Actor in a Supporting Role	Best Actress in a Supporting Role
Vladimír Dlouhý – Kajínek; Igor Bareš – Identity Card; Igor Chmela – Identity Card; Lukáš Latinák – Walking Too Fast; Oldřich Kaiser – Walking Too Fast	Eliška Balzerovvá – Women in Temptation; Zuzana Kronerová – Habermann; Zuzana Čapková – Mamas & Papas; Kristýna Liška Boková – Identity Card; Barbora Milotová – Walking Too Fast
Best Screenplay	Best Documentary
Ondřej Štindl – Walking Too Fast; Wolfgang Limmer, Juraj Herz, Jan Drbohlav – Habermann; Alice Nellis – Mamas & Papas; Robert Sedláček – Largest of the Czechs; Petr Jarchovský – Identity Card	Katka – Helena Třeštíková; 25 ze šedesátých aneb Československá nová vlna – Martin Šulík; Czech Peace – Vít Klusák, Filip Remunda; Bear Islands – Martin Ryšavý; Matchmaking Mayor – Erika Hníková
Best Cinematography	Best Editing
Jaromír Kačer – Walking Too Fast; Alexander Šurkala – Habermann; Marek Jícha – Head - hands - hearT; Vladimír Smutný – Kooky; Martin Štrba – Identity Card	Alois Fišárek – Kooky; Matouš Outrata – Kajínek; Petr Mrkous – Mamas & Papas; Vladimír Barák – Identity Card; Anna Johnson Ryndová – Walking Too Fast
Music	Sound
Michal Novinski – Kooky; Jan Ponocný a Buty – Mamas & Papas; Petr Ostrouchov – Identity Card; Tomáš Vtípil – Walking Too Fast; Jan P. Muchow – Women in Temptation	Jakub Čech, Juraj Mravec a Pavel Rejholec – Kooky; Tomáš Bělohradský – Habermann; Jiří Klenka – Identity Card; Jakub Čech, Marek Hart – Walking Too Fast; Ivo Špalj – Surviving Life
Design	Unique Contribution to Czech Film
Jan Švankmajer – Surviving Life; David Jařab – Head - hands - hearT; Jakub Dvorský – Kooky; Milan Býček – Identity Card; Pavol Andraško – Walking Too Fast	Zdeněk Svěrák

=== Non-statutory Awards ===
Film Critics' Award for Best Film	Film Critics' Award Best Documentary
Walking Too Fast; Kooky; Largest of the Czechs; Identity Card; Surviving Life	Czech Peace; Katka; Catenaccio a la Drnovice or Journey to the Beginning of the Time of Economic Transformation; Bear Islands; Matchmaking Mayor
Best Film Poster	Best Foreign Film
Kooky – Petr Štěpán	Inception; The White Ribbon; The Imaginarium of Doctor Parnassus; The Ghost Writer; A Serious Man
Magnesie Award for Best Student Film	Kinobox.cz Award for the Best Film
Graffitiger – Libor Pixa	Women in Temptation
