= Czech Film Critics' Award for Best Actress in Leading Role =

- Country: Czech Republic
- First award: 2010–2013
- Currently held by: Petra Špalková
- Website: filmovakritika.cz

Czech Film Critics' Award for Best Actress in Leading Role was one of the awards given to the best Czech motion picture. It was discontinued in 2013.

== Winners ==
Year	Actor	Film title (English)	Film title (Original)
2010	Simona Babčáková	The Largest of the Czechs	Největší z Čechů
2011	Anna Geislerová	Innocence	Nevinnost
2012	Gabriela Míčová	Garbage, the City and Death	Odpad město smrt
2013	Petra Špalková	Like Never Before	Jako nikdy
