= Kristína Tormová =

- Born: July 1, 1982 (age 43); Bratislava, Czechoslovakia
- Occupation(s): Actress, singer, dramaturge, presenter, comedian, editor, blogger, painter
- Years active: 2004–present
- Employer(s): RND, Bratislava (2004–present)
- Organization(s): VŠMU, Bratislava, Slovakia; DAMU, Prague, Czech Republic
- Spouses: Kamil Mikulčík (2009–2010); Juraj Hajdin (2010–2016); Peter Torma (m. 2018)
- Children: Matilda a Ela (2013)
- Website: Naive Theater Radošina

Kristína Tormová (née Farkašová; born 1 July 1982) is a Slovak actress, singer, dramaturge, presenter, comedian, editor, blogger and naïve art painter.

She studied dramaturgy at Academy of Performing Arts in Bratislava and at Faculty of Theater in Prague, Czech Republic. Since 2004, she is a regular member of the Naive Theater Radošina in Bratislava, while made guest appearances for The Drama Club in Prague. For her role of Klára in Pouta (2010), she received a Czech Lion-nomination as the Best Actress in Leading Role in 2011. From 2008, she hosts a television program called Postav dom, zasaď strom, and most currently also the music show Pop Legends, both produced by RTVS.

== Filmography ==
=== Cinema ===
Year	Title	Director	Production
2007	Poslední plavky (aka The Catfish Summer)	Michal Krajňák	Czech Republic
2008	Majkomasmalon ^{[A]}	Mariana Čengel Solčanská	Slovakia
2010	Pouta (aka Walking Too Fast)	Radim Špaček	Czech Republic

Notes

- A Denotes a short film.

=== Television ===
Year	Title	Director	Production
2005	Osobná chyba	Juraj Štepka	Slovakia
2005	Rodinné tajomstvá ^{[B]}	Gejza Dezorz; Peter Núňez	Slovakia
2007	Ordinácia v ružovej záhrade ^{[B]}	Various	Slovakia
2009	Rádio (aka Rádio Fresh) ^{[B]}		Slovakia
2009	Vyprávěj ^{[B]}	Biser Arichtev; Rudolf Tesáček	Czech Republic
2010	Olé, zápražka	Jozef Banyák	Slovakia
2010	Aj kone sa hrajú	Jozef Banyák	Slovakia
2010	Nesmrtelní ^{[B]}	Róbert Šveda; Katarína Ďurovičová	Slovakia
2010	Zlomok sekundy ^{[B]}	Ľuba Vančíková	Slovakia
2011	Anjeli (aka Angels)	Róbert Šveda	Slovakia
2011	Nevinní ^{[B]}	Peter Bebjak	Slovakia
2011	Hra o láske ^{[C]}	Ondrej Spišák	Slovakia
2018	Som mama ^{[B]}	Ján Novák	Slovakia

Notes

- B Denotes a TV series.
- C Denotes a televised theater.

== Awards ==
Cinema
Year	Nominated work	Award	Category	Result
2011	Pouta	Czech Lion 2010	Best Actress in Leading Role	Nominated^{[D]}

Notes

- D While the winner became Zuzana Bydžovská for her role of Irena in Mamas & Papas by Alice Nellis, the other nominees featured Lenka Vlasáková (Ženy v pokušení by Jiří Vejdělek), Anna Geislerová (Občanský průkaz by Ondřej Trojan) and Simona Babčáková (Největší z Čechů by Robert Sedláček).
