= Czech nationality law =

Czech Citizenship Act

Parliament of Czech Republic
- Long title: Act No. 186/2013 Coll., Act on State Citizenship
- Passed by: Parliament of the Czech Republic
- Passed: 26 June 2013
- Enacted: 1 January 2014
- Signed by: President Miloš Zeman

Legislative history
- Introduced by: Ministry of the Interior
- First reading: 4 December 2012
- Second reading: 20 March 2013
- Third reading: 27 March 2013

Repeals
- Act No. 186/2013 Coll., on Acquiring and Losing Citizenship of the Czech Republic
- Status: Current legislation

The citizenship law of the Czech Republic is based on the principles of jus sanguinis or "right by blood". In other words, descent from a Czech parent is the primary method of acquiring Czech citizenship (together with naturalisation). Birth on Czech territory without a Czech parent is in itself insufficient for the conferral of Czech citizenship. Every Czech citizen is also a citizen of the European Union. The law came into effect on 1 January 1993, the date of the dissolution of Czechoslovakia, and has been amended in 1993, 1995, 1996, 1999, 2002, 2003, and 2005. Since 1 January 2014, multiple citizenship under Czech law is allowed.

== Acquisition ==
=== Citizenship by birth ===
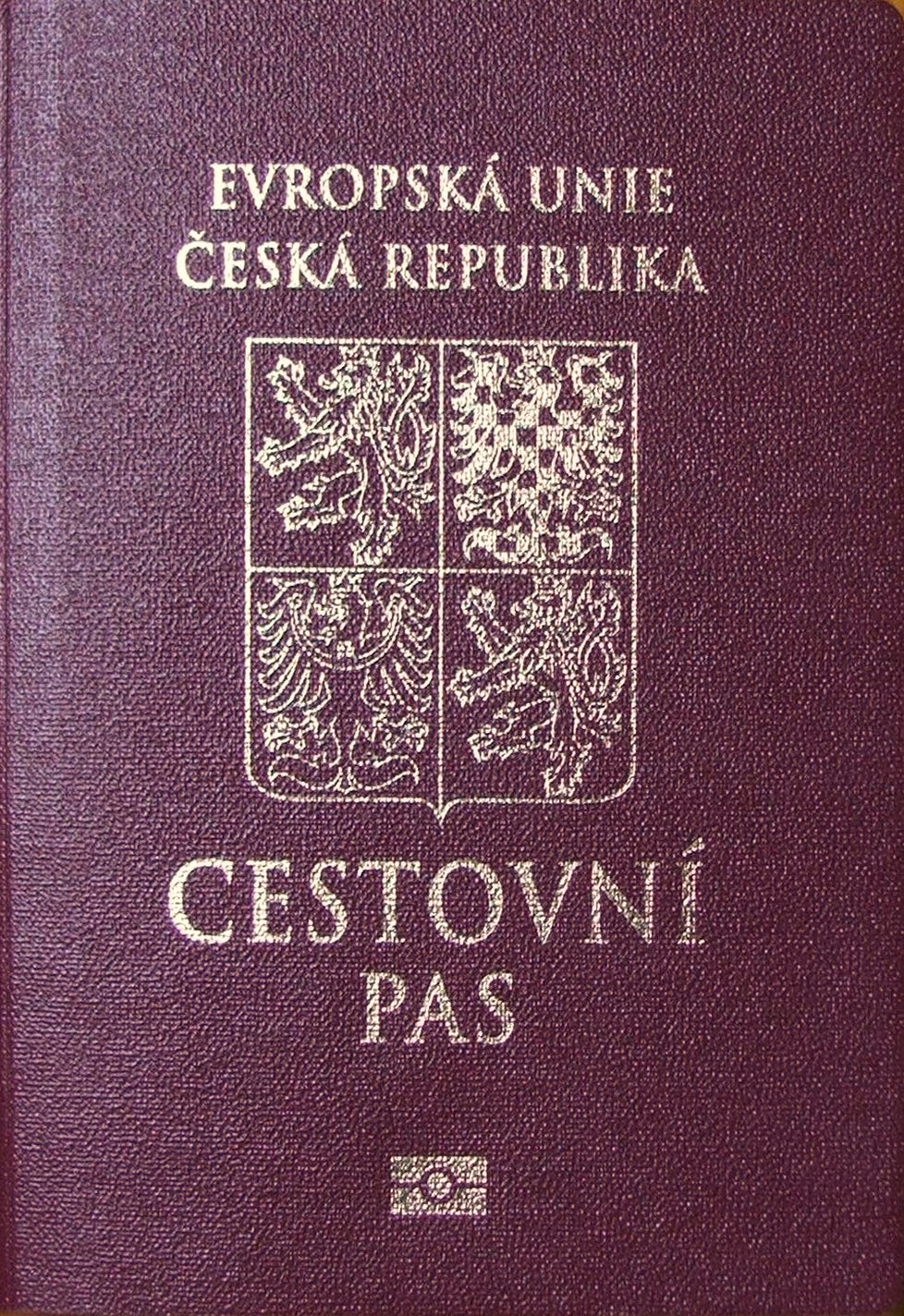
The cover of a biometric Czech passport

The principle of jus sanguinis is used to determine eligibility for citizenship, as is typical in Europe. In principle, any person born to a Czech citizen is a Czech citizen at birth. If both grandparents on someone's maternal lineage or paternal lineage, Czech nationality will be transmitted down to the family lineage up till grandchildren. Whether a person is born in the Czech Republic or elsewhere is irrelevant. Where only the father is Czech, and the parents are unmarried, proof of paternity is required — by the parents making a concerted declaration before the Registry Office or a court, submission of a DNA test, or a court determination relating to the paternity of the child.

Children born in the Czech Republic to non-Czech parents do not acquire Czech citizenship unless:

- the parents are stateless

Abandoned children aged less than 15 years found on the territory of the Czech Republic (where the identity of the parents cannot be established) are deemed to be Czech citizens.

=== Naturalization ===
Resident foreigners or stateless persons who have held a right of permanent residence for at least five years (reduced to three years for EU citizens) and have resided in the Czech Republic for most of that time can apply for Czech naturalization if they can prove they are of good character and are proficient in Czech (current or former Slovak citizens are exempt from language requirements). Parents can apply for their children under 15 years of age, and naturalization occurs at the discretion of the Interior Ministry.

The residence requirement can be waived if the person has a permanent residence permit and

- Has lived there for at least 10 years continuously, or
- Was born on the territory of the Czech Republic, or
- Has held Czech or Czechoslovak citizenship before, or
- At least one of his or her parents is a Czech citizen, or
- Was adopted by a Czech citizen, or
- His or her spouse or registered/civil partner is a Czech citizen, or
- Is under 18 years of age, or
- Is stateless or has refugee status in the Czech Republic., or
- Is applying for naturalization by Section 16 and whose grant of citizenship would be a significant benefit to the Czech Republic from a sports, scientific, cultural, or other perspective

=== Declaration ===
If a person was a citizen of the Czech and Slovak Federative Republic as of 31 December 1992, he may declare citizenship of either the Czech Republic or Slovakia (gaining Slovak citizenship) assuming he does not have any other citizenship. The Slovak provision allowing for this grant expired in 1993, however, the Czech equivalent remains in the citizenship law.

The children and grandchildren of former Czech or Czechoslovak citizens who lost their citizenship on or before 31 December 2013 are also eligible to claim citizenship by declaration, also known as citizenship by descent.

Since the new amendment allowing children and grandchildren to renew their Czech citizenship through the descent route was enacted in September 2019, only about 280 children or grandchildren have taken advantage of the fast-track citizenship as of April 2021. This in spite of over an estimated 1 million Czech descendants living in the United States and an estimated 100,000 or more being eligible for the citizenship.

Because Czechoslovakia and the United States had a treaty that forbade dual nationality for those who were naturalized in the other country at the age of 21 or older, the new citizenship by descent (declaration) mainly concerns US citizens with Czech ancestry, as it is easy to prove loss of citizenship with a US naturalization certificate. Before 1993, simply naturalizing in another country did not automatically mean loss of citizenship unless the individual who lost it was at least 21 years and naturalized in the United States or was a minor child whose US citizenship was derived from his/her parents who naturalized in the United States.

If an individual with Czech ancestry has ascendants who naturalized in a country other than the United States and is thus unable to prove loss of citizenship by naturalization due to a lack of a treaty between their country and Czechoslovakia that restricted dual citizenship, they may be eligible for Czech citizenship by proving a loss of an ancestor's citizenship by other means. One such way could be if their ancestor was a grandmother who married a non-Czechoslovak citizen before 24 June 1947, in which case their grandmother would have automatically lost Czechoslovak citizenship ipso iure due to the Emigrant Patent of Austrian Law from 1832. The proof of loss of citizenship in this case would be the grandmother's marriage certificate.

== Loss of citizenship ==
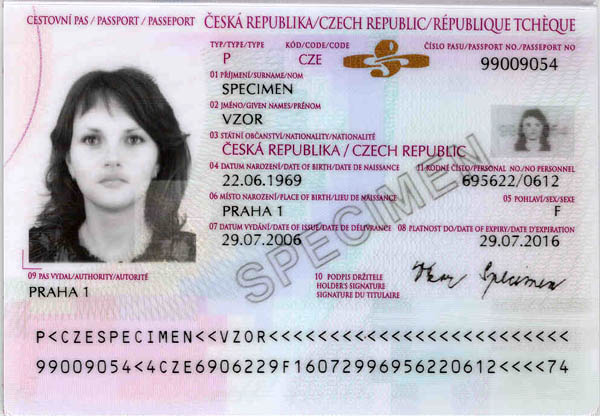
The information page of a Czech passport

=== Voluntary (restrictions on dual citizenship) ===
Czech citizenship can be renounced voluntarily if doing so wouldn't cause one to be stateless unless it is in connection with a marriage or by birth – the Czech Republic does not require children born with another nationality to renounce it upon reaching maturity.

=== Involuntary ===
The involuntary loss of citizenship is constitutionally prohibited. However, before the 2013 Citizenship Act (effective as of 1 January 2014) it was sometimes argued by emigrants and emigrant groups that the restrictions on dual citizenship were a form of involuntary deprivation of citizenship.

During the communist era (1948–89) hundreds of thousands of Czechoslovak citizens had emigrated into other parts of the West. The regime punished emigration by removing Czechoslovak citizenship, along with property confiscation and in absentia prison sentences. Since the Velvet Revolution in 1989, many emigrants demanded their citizenship be restored. Between 1999 and 2004, a special measure allowed them to regain the citizenship, but a few people took advantage of the wording, which "granted" citizenship rather than "restored" it and so got dual citizenship. A few people from Volhynia and Romania also got citizenship.

== Proof of citizenship ==
Czech citizenship can be proved by

- A national identification card (občanský průkaz) (mandatory for those over 15 years of age),
- A travel document; e.g. a Czech passport,
- A certificate of Czech citizenship (CCC) issued by the Ministry of the Interior that is less than 12 months old since the date of issuance,
- A Czech marriage certificate, but only if the citizenship details are included.

== Dual citizenship ==
Czech Republic allows its citizens to hold foreign citizenship in addition to their Czech citizenship since 2014. The Czech government maintains a registry of those nationals who hold a concurrent nationality in addition to their Czech nationality.

Some countries, however, do not permit multiple citizenship e.g. adults who acquired Czech and Japanese citizenship by birth must declare, to the latter's Ministry of Justice, before turning 22, which citizenship they want to keep.

== Citizenship of the European Union ==
Because Czech Republic forms part of the European Union, Czech citizens are also citizens of the European Union under European Union law and thus enjoy rights of free movement and have the right to vote in elections for the European Parliament. When in a non-EU country where there is no Czech embassy, Czech citizens have the right to get consular protection from the embassy of any other EU country present in that country. Czech citizens can live and work in any country within the EU as a result of the right of free movement and residence granted in Article 21 of the EU Treaty.

== Travel freedom of Czech citizens ==
Visa requirements for Czech citizens Czech Republic Freedom of movement Visa free Visa issued upon arrival eVisa Visa available both on arrival or online Visa required prior to arrival

Visa requirements for Czech citizens are administrative entry restrictions by the authorities of other states placed on citizens of Czech Republic. As of May 2018, Czech citizens had visa-free or visa on arrival access to 187 countries and territories, ranking the Czech passport 5th in terms of travel freedom (tied with Belgian, Maltese, New Zealand, Norwegian and Swiss passports) according to the Henley Passport Index.

In 2018, The Czech nationality is ranked 13th in Nationality Index (QNI). This index differs from the Visa Restrictions Index, which focuses on external factors including travel freedom. The QNI considers, in addition, to travel freedom on internal factors such as peace & stability, economic strength, and human development as well.

== See also ==
- Slovak nationality law
