= Kinobox =

Czech film database

- Former name: Kinobox.cz
- Website type: Web page, Movie database, Online magazine
- Founded: Petr Vachler
- Owner: Kinobox s. r. o.
- Website: www.kinobox.cz

Kinobox is a Czech multimedia platform providing information about films, TV shows/series, actors, and production crew members. The Kinobox website contains an extensive database of audiovisual works and their creators, an online film magazine, a search engine providing information about streaming services and a video library with trailers, accompanying video materials and original video production.

After registration, the user can rate individual works in the database, add comments and participate in discussions. Each activity is then automatically rewarded with points, which helps to increase its visibility on the website.

== History ==
=== TV show ===
In 1993, the TV magazine Kinobox began broadcasting on ČT1, focusing on domestic and foreign news from the world of film. The creator and entrepreneur Petr Vachler, founder of the Czech Film and Television Academy and the Czech Lion Film Awards, was behind the programme. The information and comedy magazine was regularly hosted by Miloš Kohout, Roman Holý and Petr Čtvrtníček. In December 2008, the last episode of Kinobox was broadcast.

=== Czech Movie Heaven ===
In 1995, Radek Vetešník and Petr Herudek, students of the Technical University of Ostrava, launched their own film database. Originally a student project, it was transformed over the years into the film database Czech Movie Heaven (České filmové nebe), whose content was primarily focused on information about Czech and Slovak cinema films.

=== Kinobox.cz ===
In 2009, it was announced that Petr Vachler was buying the ČFN database with the aim of creating a comprehensive film website that would combine an information database with an internet television and news server. The database was subsequently merged with the Kinobox media brand, to which Petr Vachler owned the copyright. In 2010, the new Kinobox.cz film portal was officially launched.

In May 2020, Petr Vachler sold the Kinobox.cz web portal to Livesport, a Czech technology company owned by entrepreneur Martin Hajek. Radim Horák became its director. On 29 March 2023, the new look of the platform was launched. At the end of June 2023, the platform added an artificial intelligence feature, calculating the expected ratings for the most anticipated films and series.
