= Walking Too Fast =

2009 Czech thriller film

- Film poster
- Czech: Pouta
- Directed by: Radim Špaček
- Written by: Ondřej Štindl
- Produced by: Vratislav Šlajer
- Starring: Ondřej Malý
- Cinematography: Jaromír Kačer
- Edited by: Anna Ryndová
- Music by: Tomáš Vtípil
- Production companies: Bionaut Films; Ceská Televize; ALEF Film & Media Group; Universal Production Partners; Film Studio Gatteo (co-production) Soundsquare
- Distributed by: Bontonfilm
- Release dates: 3 October 2009 (Ostrava Film Festival); 4 February 2010
- Running time: 146 minutes
- Countries: Czech Republic; Slovak Republic; Poland
- Language: Czech
- Budget: 15,000,000 Kč
- Box office: $71,105

Walking Too Fast (Czech: Pouta, literally handcuffs or bonds) is a Czech thriller and drama film directed by Radim Špaček. Released in 2010, it is a psychological story about relations between the secret police (StB) and the dissident movement, set in communist Czechoslovakia in the 1980s. The film was compared to the German film The Lives of Others.

Walking Too Fast is described as a dark thriller with an unpredictable protagonist who becomes dangerous to all people around including himself. His way to reach the goal is self-destructive.

== Plot ==
The story revolves around Antonín Rusnák who is an StB agent. He feels rage towards the world. He feels sick and bored from his family and work. His psychological issues cause him breathing problems and his doctor advises him to breathe into a bag if he gets a fit.

Antonín and his partner Martin surveil Tomáš and Pavel. They are both dissidents but Pavel is also collaborating with Antonín and Martin. Antonín finds out that Tomáš, who is married, has a lover, Klára. Antonín becomes interested in her. He secretly follows her and uses his authority to protect her. He beats up a guy who bothers her or prevents her boss from firing her because of her links to the dissidents. He also pushes Tomáš to leave the country to get rid of him. He beats him up during interrogations and reveals his affair to his family and Tomáš finally decides to leave Czechoslovakia.

Antonín forces Pavel to arrange a meeting with Klára in exchange for seeing his file. Pavel then meets Antonín's partner Martin in order to reveal the agreement he made with Antonín. Martin states that Antonín is done at StB but doesn't know that Antonín is aware of their meeting and lures Martin to the woods where he attacks him and threatens him with a gun. Martin begs him for his life and Antonín handcuffs him to a tree.

Antonín and Klára meet in Pavel's apartment. The meeting doesn't end well and Antonín gets a fit so he breathes into the bag which makes Klára realize that Antonín is the agent who terrorized Tomáš. He tells her that he followed her and she admits that she felt as if somebody was watching her for a long time. Antonín reveals his name and she says that he has to stop watching her.

Klára leaves the apartment but writes a message for Pavel on the Wall - "Svině" (Swine). Klára goes Home and meets the ambulance that takes her pregnant Friend Darina to the Hospital. She gets on the ambulance but looks around if anybody watches her. The film ends with Antonín waking up at the lakeside. The audience can now hear his thoughts as he enters the lake and goes deeper and deeper. He thinks about who he was and hopes that Klára will remember his name. In the end he states "It is beautiful here" as he kills himself.

== Cast ==
- Ondřej Malý – Antonín Rusnák, a State Security agent
- Martin Finger – Tomáš Sýkora, a dissident
- Kristína Farkašová – Klára Kadlecová, Tomáš's lover
- Luboš Veselý – Pavel Veselý, an important figure in the dissident movement and a close friend to Tomáš
- Lukáš Latinák – Martin Husár, Antonín's partner
- Barbora Milotová – Silvie Sýkorová – Tomáš's wife
- Ivana Uhlířová – Darina, Klára's friend
- Oldřich Kaiser – Janeček, Antonín and Martin's boss
- Iva Pazderková – Miluška
- Jana Janěková – Šimková
- Monika Fingerová – Rusnák's wife
- Jiří Štrébl – Martinec
- Cyril Drozda – Doctor
- Natálie Drabiščáková – Anna Řeháková

== Production ==
The film was inspired by 1995's Casino. Screenwriter Ondřej Štindl decided to make a similar story that would replace mobsters with agents of Communist State Security. The first version of screenwriting was made in 2002. Actors for the film were chosen in casting that took 18 months.

Shooting started in December 2008 and concluded in the summer of 2009. The film was shot in Prague, Ostrava and Bratislava. Post-production concluded in December 2009.

== Release ==
The film premiered on 4 February 2010. The film returned to cinemas on 3 March 2011 as a reaction to its success at the Czech Lion Awards.

== Awards ==
The film received 13 nominations for the Czech Lion. It won five of them - Best Film, Best Director, Best Screenplay, Best Cinematography and Best Actor in Leading Role. The film also received the Film Critics' Award.

Walking Too Fast also succeeded at the Czech Film Critics' Awards. The film won awards in five categories - Best Film, Best Director, Best Screenplay, Best Actor in Leading Role and RWE Award.

== Reception ==
The film has won universal acclaim from critics in the Czech Republic. Out of all Czech films Walking too fast is number one on Czech movie aggregator Kinobox.cz where it holds 87% from critics. František Fuka considers it to be the best Czech film in the few last years if not the best since the Velvet revolution. The film holds 74% on Czech-Slovak Film Database.

=== Reviews ===
- Jaroslav Sedláček, Kinobox.cz, February 4, 2010 85%
- Kamil Fila, Aktuálně.cz, February 5, 2010 75%
- Kamila Boháčková, A2 3/2010
- Jan Gregor, Respekt 5/2010, February 1, 2010
- Vít Schmarc, MovieZone.cz, January 26, 2010 90%
- František Fuka, FFFilm, January 11, 2010 100%

=== Accolades ===
Date of ceremony	Award	Category	Recipient(s)	Result	Ref.
2010	Finále Plzeň Film Festival	Golden Kingfisher for the Best Film	Radim Špaček	Nominated	
2010	Finále Plzeň Film Festival	Golden Kingfisher for the Best Actor	Ondřej Malý	Won	
2010	Finále Plzeň Film Festival	Special Recognition	Radim Špaček	Won	
2010	Warsaw International Film Festival	Best Film	Bionaut Films	Nominated	
2011	Czech Film Critics' Awards	Best Film	Bionaut Films	Won	
2011	Czech Film Critics' Awards	Best Director	Radim Špaček	Won	
2011	Czech Film Critics' Awards	Best Cinematography	Jaromír Kačer	Nominated	
2011	Czech Film Critics' Awards	Best Screenplay	Ondřej Štindl	Won	
2011	Czech Film Critics' Awards	Best Original Soundtrack	Tomáš Vtípil	Nominated	
2011	Czech Film Critics' Awards	Best Actor in Leading Role	Ondřej Malý	Won	
2011	Czech Film Critics' Awards	RWE Award	Ondřej Malý	Won	
2011	Czech Lion Awards	Best Film	Radim Špaček	Won	
2011	Czech Lion Awards	Best Director	Radim Špaček	Won	
2011	Czech Lion Awards	Best Screenplay	Ondřej Štindl	Won	
2011	Czech Lion Awards	Best Supporting Actress	Kristína Farkašová	Nominated	
2011	Czech Lion Awards	Best Actress in a Leading Role	Barbora Milotová	Nominated	
2011	Czech Lion Awards	Best Actor in Leading Role	Ondřej Malý	Won	
2011	Czech Lion Awards	Best Supporting Actor	Lukáš Latinák	Nominated	
2011	Czech Lion Awards	Best Supporting Actor	Oldřich Kaiser	Nominated	
2011	Czech Lion Awards	Best Cinematography	Jaromír Kačer	Won	
2011	Czech Lion Awards	Best Music	Tomáš Vtípil	Nominated	
2011	Czech Lion Awards	Best Editing	Anna Johnson Ryndová	Nominated	
2011	Czech Lion Awards	Best Sound	Jakub Čech, Marek Hart	Nominated	
2011	Czech Lion Awards	Best Design	Pavol Andraško	Nominated	
2011	Czech Lion Awards	Film Critics and Theoretics Award for the Best Film	Radim Špaček	Won	
2011	Trilobit Awards	Best film	Radim Špaček	Won	

== International festivals ==
The film was shown at Karlovy Vary International Film Festival, Warsaw International Film Festival, Busan International Film Festival, East European Film Festival and Berlin International Film Festival.
