= Long Live the Family! =

2011 Czech crime film

- Film poster
- Czech: Rodina je základ státu
- Directed by: Robert Sedláček
- Written by: Robert Sedláček
- Produced by: Radim Procházka
- Starring: Igor Chmela; Eva Vrbková
- Release date: 13 October 2011
- Running time: 103 minutes
- Country: Czech Republic
- Language: Czech
- Budget: 16 million CZK

Long Live the Family! (Czech: Rodina je základ státu; lit. 'The family is the foundation of the state') is a 2011 Czech crime film directed by Robert Sedláček. The film won the Czech Film Critics' Award for the best film of 2011.

== Plot ==
Libor Pokorný works in a bank. A few billion Czech crowns disappeared from the bank as a result of fraud that he was involved in. The fraud is investigated by two police officers. He realises that he will go to prison. He persuades his wife Iva to take their family for a trip but doesn't tell her of his situation. Police realise that he is on the run. Libor can't leave the republic due to his daughter's health but he tries to solve his situation. He avoids police and tries to hide the truth from his family. They eventually come across old friends Lenka and Jiří. They sleep over at their place and celebrate the reunion. Libor tells Jiří of his situation. Jiří agrees to lend him his car. Libor asks Iva if she would stay faithful to him when he would have to leave the family for a few years. She doesn't respond. Next day Libor and his family leave. Libor wants to go to Slovakia. The family accommodates at a hotel. There Iva finds out the truth. She has an argument with Libor. Police find out that Libor is at the hotel but he and his family manage to escape. Iva decides to stay by her husband and helps him to escape. Their car crashes to a tree. There Libor admits to his wife that he was involved with the fraud and that he wanted to prepare his family for his arrest. Before the police arrests Libor, Iva responds to his previous question - her life has meaning only with him.

== Cast ==
- Igor Chmela as Libor Pokorný
- Eva Vrbková as Iva Pokorná
- Martin Finger as the Investigator
- Monika A. Fingerová as the female Investigator
- Albert Mikšík as Lukáš Pokorný
- Kristýna Tomíčková as Tina Pokorná
- Simona Babčáková as Lenka
- Jiří Vyorálek as Jiří
