= Czech passport =

Passport of the Czech Republic issued to Czech citizens

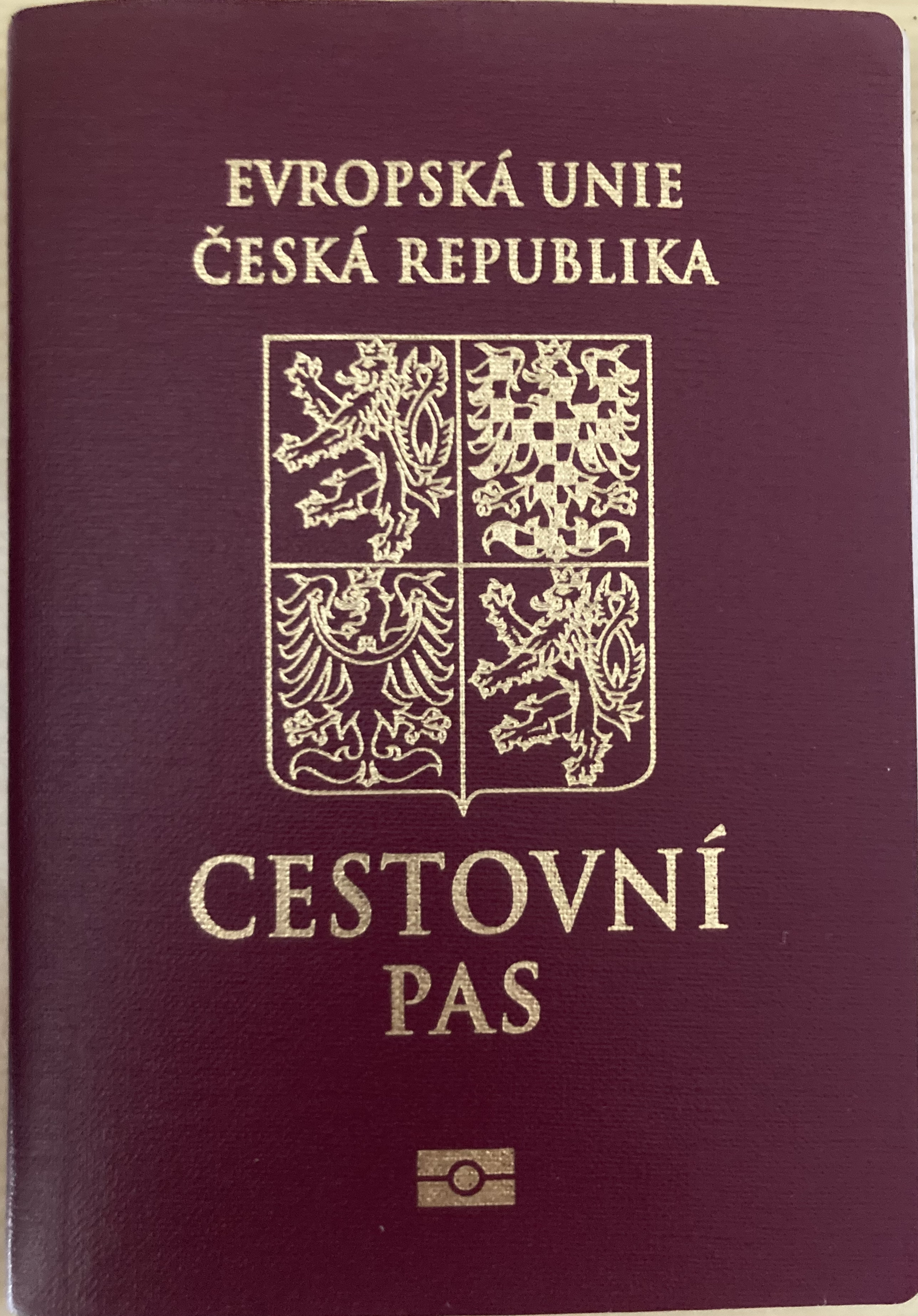
- The front cover of a contemporary Czech biometric passport

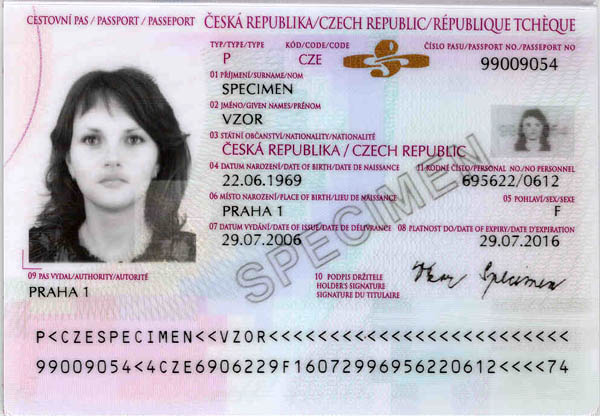
- The information-page of a Czech passport
- Type: Passport
- Issued by: Czech Republic
- First issued: September 1, 2006 (biometric passport)
- Purpose: Identification
- Eligibility: Czech citizenship
- Expiration: 5 years after issuance for individuals up to the age of 14; 10 years for citizens aged 15 and above

The Czech passport (Czech: cestovní pas, pas) is an international travel document issued to nationals of the Czech Republic, and may also serve as proof of Czech citizenship. Besides enabling the bearer to travel internationally and serving as indication of Czech citizenship, the passport facilitates the process of securing assistance from Czech consular officials abroad or other European Union member states in case a Czech consular is absent, if needed.

As of 2024, Czech citizens had visa-free or visa on arrival access to 189 countries and territories, ranking the Czech passport 6th overall in terms of travel freedom according to the Henley Passport Index. and 5th in passport index https://www.passportindex.org/. Czech citizens can live and work in any country within the EU as a result of the right of free movement and residence granted in Article 21 of the EU Treaty.

Every Czech citizen is also a citizen of the European Union. The nationality allows for free rights of movement and residence in any of the states of the European Union, Switzerland and the European Economic Area, but a passport or a national identity card is in practice needed for identification.

== Application ==
The passport is issued by the Interior Ministry (Ministerstvo vnitra), and as is internationally customary remains property of the Czech Republic and can be withdrawn at any time. It is a valid Proof of Citizenship document according to the Czech nationality law. Citizens can hold multiple passports at the same time if they meet the criteria. The Ministry of Foreign Affairs sporadically issues a list of nations with visa-free travel arrangements with the Czech Republic.

== Physical appearance ==
Czech passports are burgundy like most other passports of the European Union, with the Czech coat of arms emblazoned in the centre of the front cover. The words "EVROPSKÁ UNIE" (Czech: European Union) and "ČESKÁ REPUBLIKA" (Czech: Czech Republic) are inscribed above the coat of arms and the words "CESTOVNÍ PAS" (Czech: Passport) are inscribed below the coat of arms. Czech passports adhere to the common EU design and International Civil Aviation Organization requirements

=== Identity information page ===
- Photo of passport holder
- Type (P)
- Code (CZE)
- Passport no.
- 01 Surname
- 02 Given names
- 03 Nationality (Česká republika/Czech Republic)
- 04 Date of birth
- 05 Sex
- 06 Place of birth
- 07 Date of issue
- 08 Date of expiry
- 09 Authority
- 10 Holder's signature
- 11 Personal no.

The lower area of the data page contains the Machine-readable zone.

=== Passport note ===
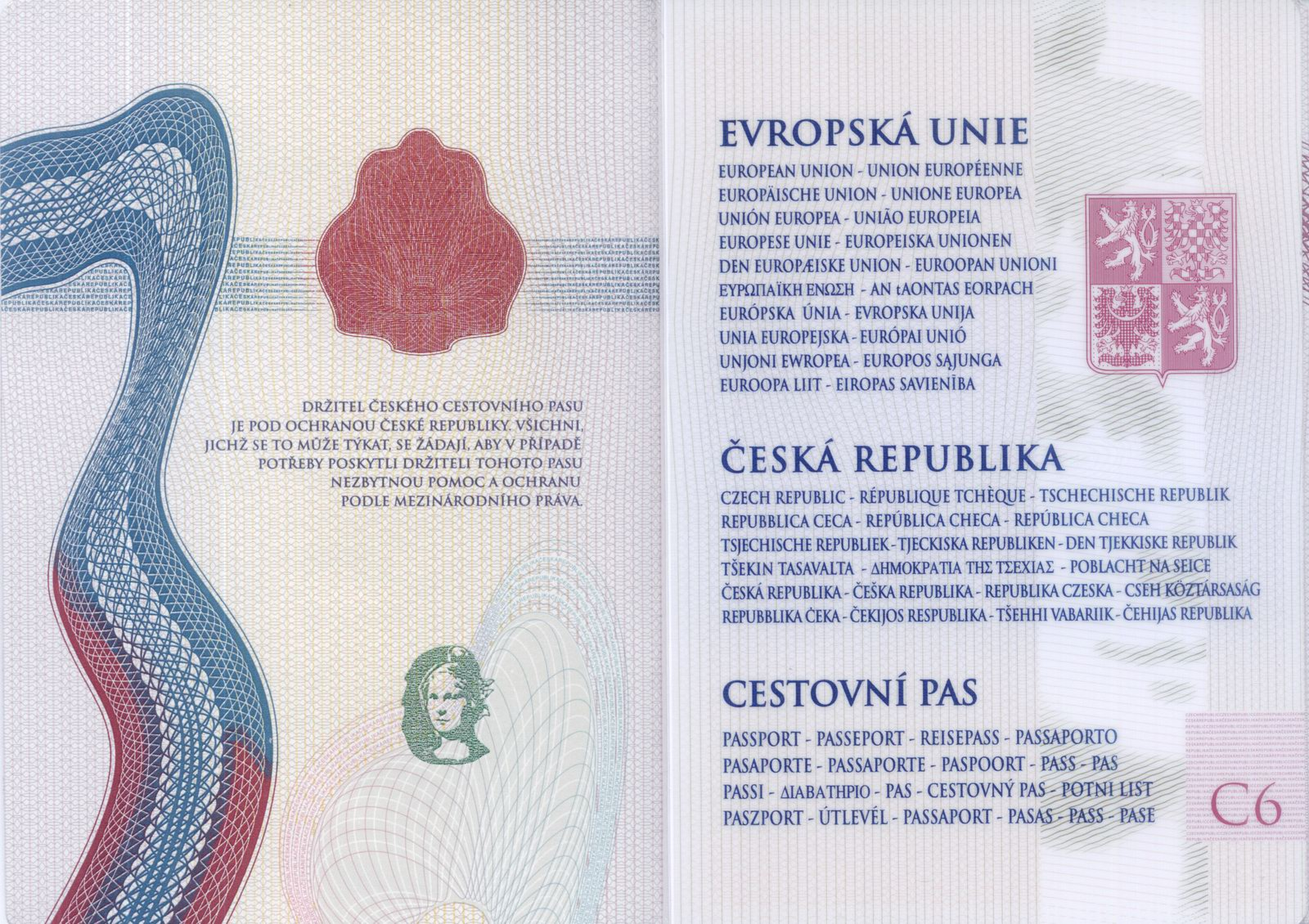
The inner pages of a contemporary Czech biometric passport

Passports typically contain a message from the minister or official in charge of passport issuance addressed to the officials of foreign states, requesting that the citizen bearing the passport be allowed free passage through the state, and if in need be provided assistance consistent with international norms. Today this treatment is expected rather than requested, but the message remains as a tradition. Czech passports bear this message only in Czech, in capitals and as follows:

Držitel českého cestovního pasu je pod ochranou České republiky. Všichni, jichž se to může týkat, se žádají, aby v případě potřeby poskytli držiteli tohoto pasu nezbytnou pomoc a ochranu podle mezinárodního práva.

The above message when unofficially rendered in English, would read:

The holder of a Czech passport is under the protection of the Czech Republic. All those whom it may concern are hereby requested to, in times of need, render the holder of this passport all essential help and protection under international law.

=== Languages ===
The data page is printed in Czech, English and French, followed a few pages later with translations to all remaining official EU languages and Russian.

== Visa requirements ==
Visa requirements for Czech citizens Czech Republic Freedom of movement Visa free Visa issued upon arrival eVisa Visa available both on arrival or online Visa required prior to arrival

As of 1 January 2023, Czech citizens had visa-free or visa on arrival access to 186 countries and territories, ranking the Czech passport 7th overall in terms of travel freedom according to the Henley Passport Index.

== History ==
=== Non-machine-readable passports ===
These series have become obsolete and are only issued for emergency reasons due to more expedient processing.

==== 1993 passport series ====
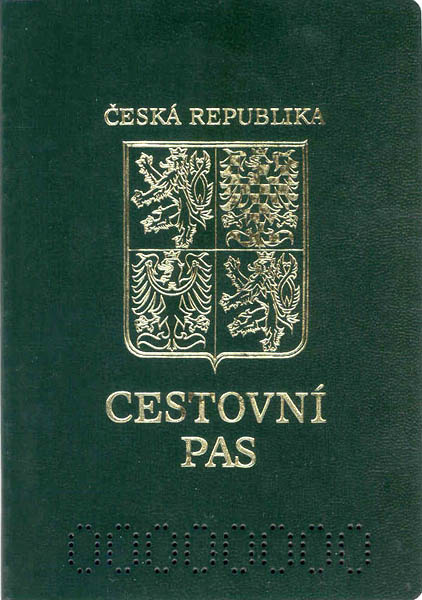
Cover

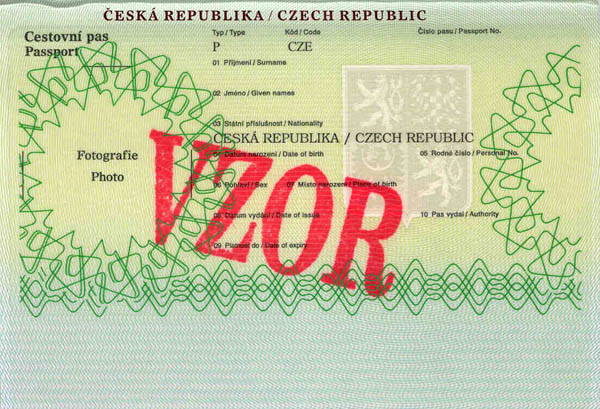
Data

The first passport of the Czech Republic, issued between the dissolution of Czechoslovakia and 31/3/2000, with a ten-year validity.

The data page is inside the back cover and printed in Czech and English. The photograph is attached with adhesive. These features remain constant for all non-machine readable passports

==== 1998 passport series ====
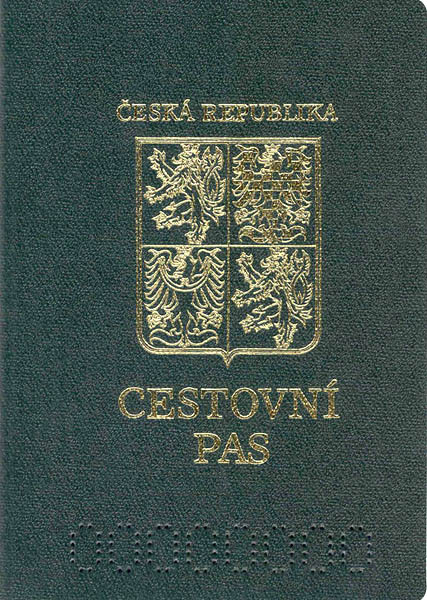
Cover

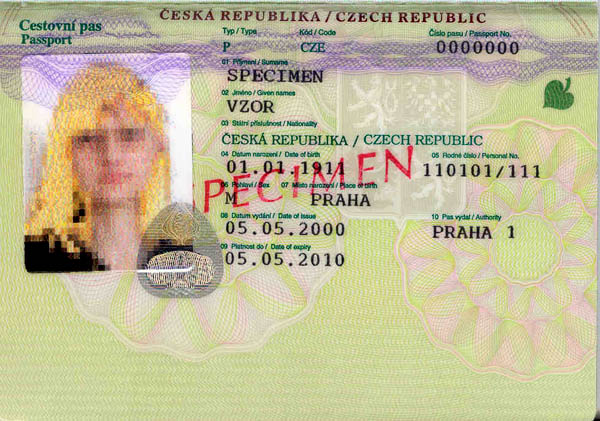
Data

Issued:

- from 2000 until 30/6/2000 with a ten-year validity
- from 1/7/2000 until 31/8/2006 with a one-year validity
- from 1/9/2006 until 31/12/2006 with a six-month validity, or for citizens under five years of age with a one year validity

==== 2005 passport series ====
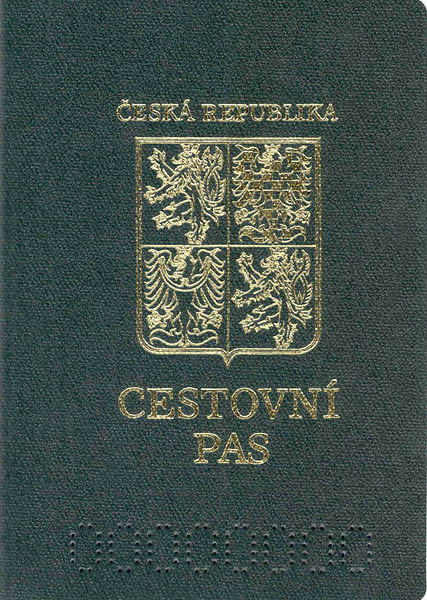
Cover

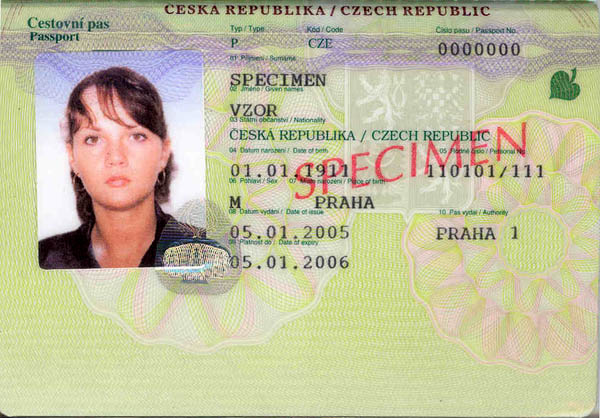
Data

Issued:

- from 2005 until 31/8/2006 with a one-year validity
- from 1/9/2006 until 31/12/2009 with a six-month validity, or for citizens under five years of age with a one year validity

==== 2007 passport series ====
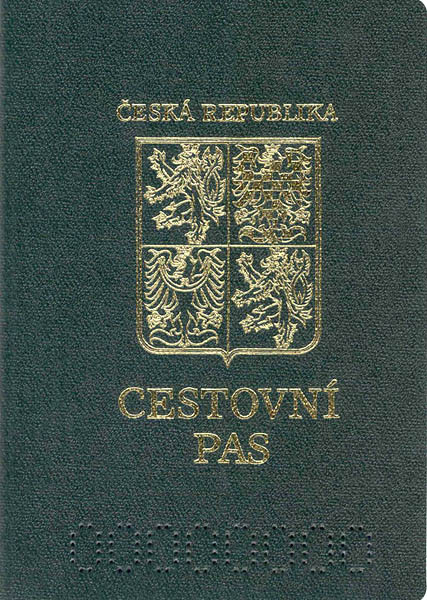
Cover

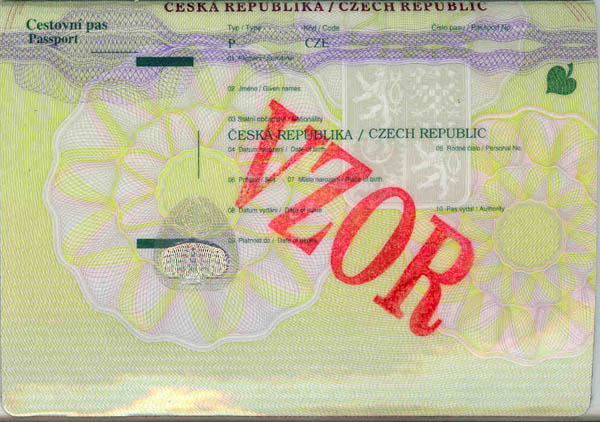
Data

Issued from February 2007 with a six-month validity, or for citizens under five years of age with a one-year validity.

=== Machine-readable passports ===
==== 2000 passport series ====
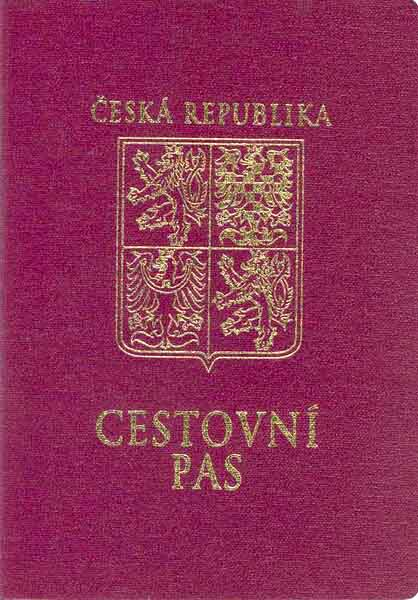
Cover

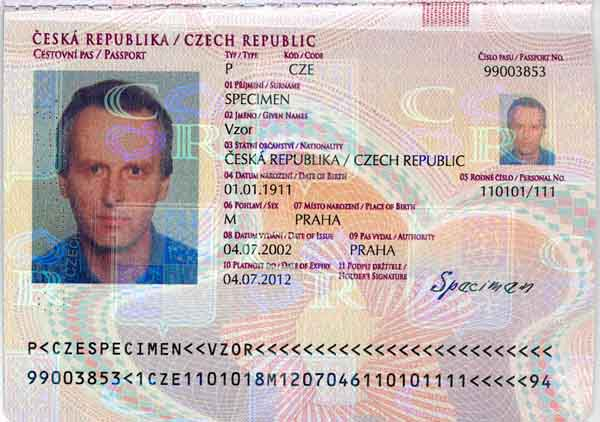
Data

Issued from 1/7/2000 until 15/3/2005 with a ten-year validity, or for citizens under fifteen years of age with a five-year validity.

The data page is inside the back cover and printed in Czech and English. The photograph is printed onto the page.

==== 2005 passport series ====
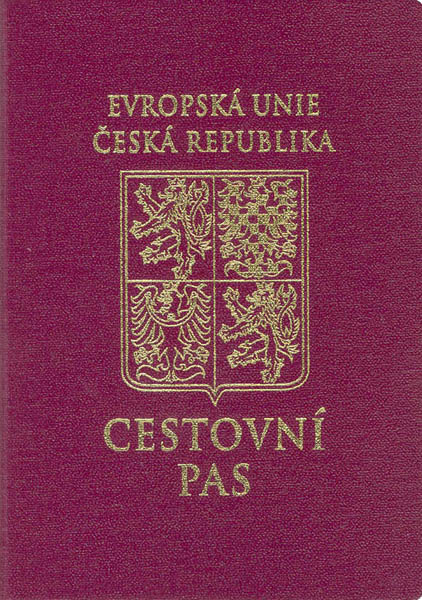
Cover

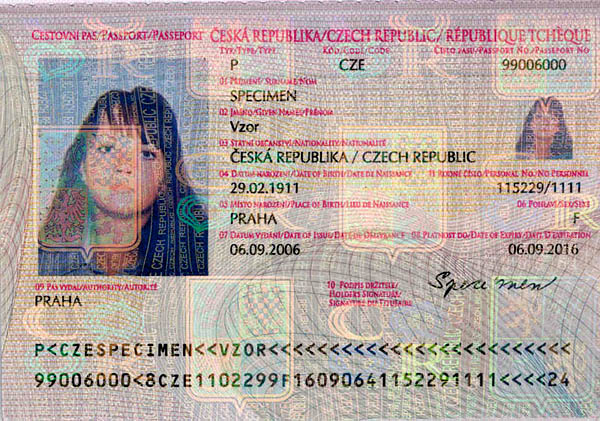
Data

Issued from 16/3/2005 until 31/8/2006 with a ten-year validity, or for citizens under fifteen years of age with a five-year validity.

As the first passport series issued following Czech ascension into the European Union, it is first to bear the words "Evropská Unie" and has been modified to conform to standard EU passport design. The data page was moved to page two, and French was added. Pages six and seven now bear translations of the data fields into eighteen languages of the European Union and Russian.

==== 2006 passport series ====
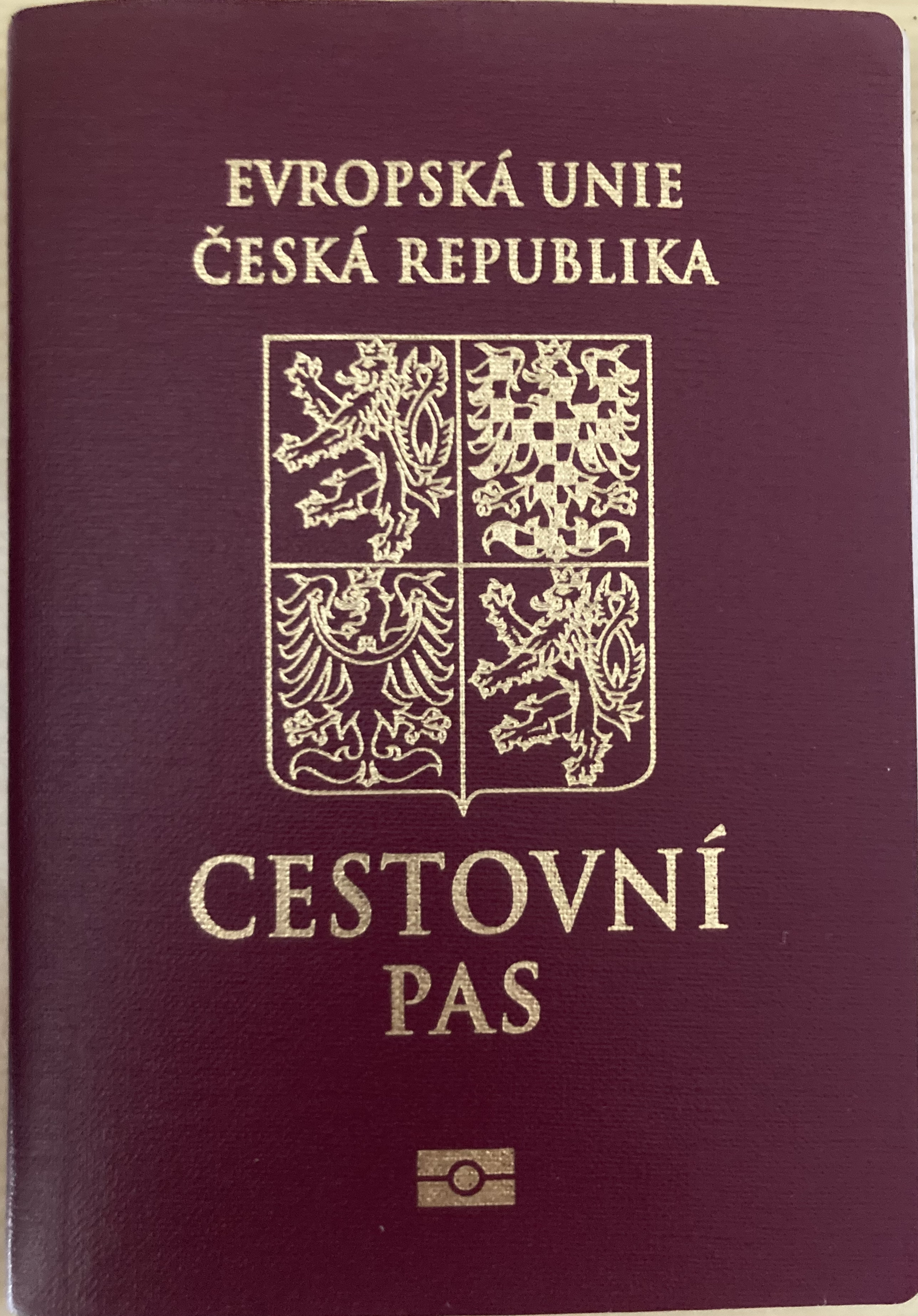
Cover

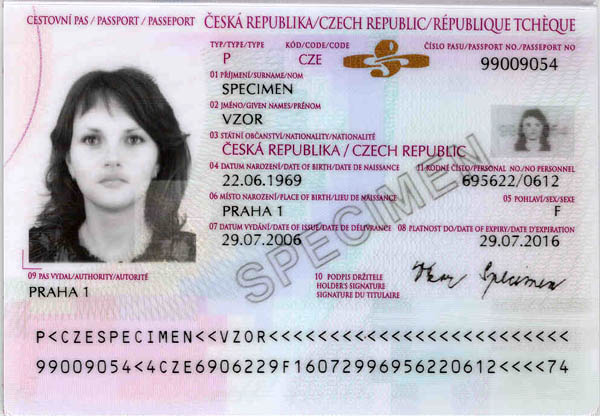
Data

Issued from 1/9/2006 with a ten-year validity, or for citizens under fifteen years of age with a five-year validity.

The 2006 series was the first biometric passport issued by the Czech Republic. The data page is now printed on a polycarbonate card and the photograph is laser-etched.

==== 2009 passport series ====
In March 2009 a new series begun to be issued. The most notable change is the addition of two fingerprints, one from the index finger on each hand in order to conform to new EU regulations.

=== Service passports ===
Issuable to:

- the Supreme Public Prosecutor of the Czech Republic
- the deputy Supreme Public Prosecutor of the Czech Republic
- deputy ministers of the Government of the Czech Republic
- the vice-president of the Supreme Court of the Czech Republic
- the vice-president of the Supreme Audit Office of the Czech Republic
- the clerk of the Chamber of Deputies of the Czech Republic
- the clerk of the Senate of the Czech Republic
- the clerk of the Government of the Czech Republic
- the clerk of the President of the Czech Republic
- employees of the Ministry of Foreign Affairs
- employees of the embassies and consulates of the Czech Republic

==== 1993 Service passport series ====
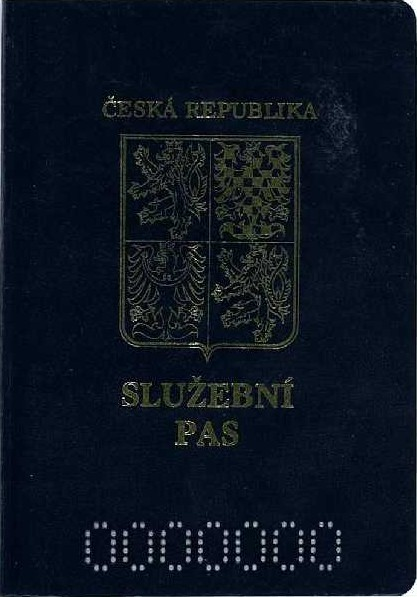
Cover

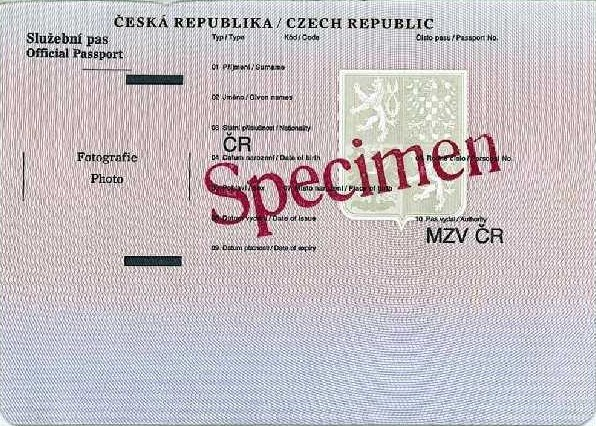
Data

The first service passport issued after the dissolution of Czechoslovakia.

==== 2002 Service passport series ====
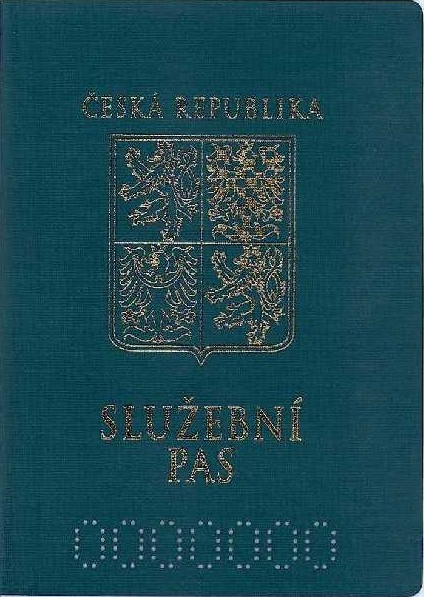
Cover

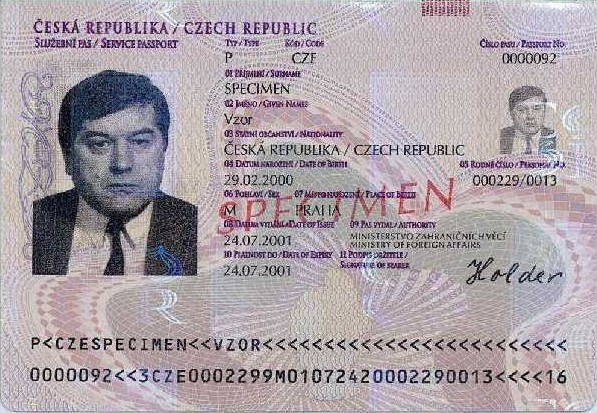
Data

With the entry of the Czech Republic into the European Union in 2004 this is no longer the current series issued.

=== Diplomatic passports ===
Issuable to:

- the President of the Czech Republic (and former presidents)
- ministers of the Government of the Czech Republic
- members of the Parliament of the Czech Republic
- justices of the Constitutional Court of the Czech Republic
- the president of the Supreme Administrative Court of the Czech Republic
- the president of the Supreme Court of the Czech Republic
- the president of the Supreme Audit Office of the Czech Republic
  - the spouse of:
    - the President of the Czech Republic
    - the Speaker of the Chamber of Deputies of the Parliament of the Czech Republic
    - the President of the Senate of the Parliament of the Czech Republic
    - ministers of the Government of the Czech Republic
    - the president of the Supreme Administrative Court of the Czech Republic
    - the president of the Supreme Court of the Czech Republic
    - the chief justice of the Constitutional Court of the Czech Republic
- diplomatic staff

==== 1993 Diplomatic passport series ====
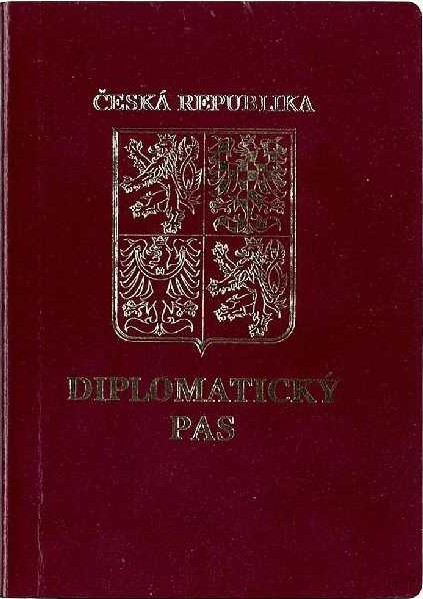
Cover

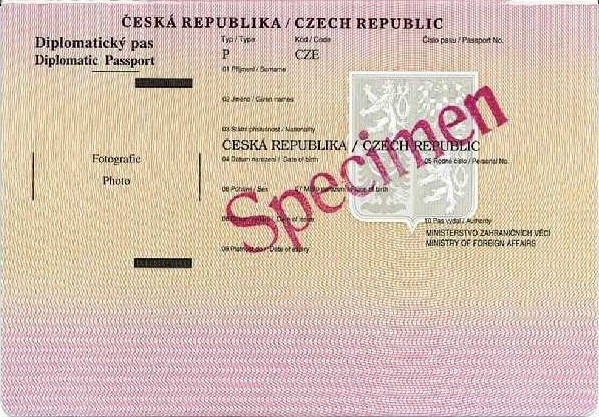
Data

The first diplomatic passport issued after the dissolution of Czechoslovakia.

==== 2001 Diplomatic passport series ====
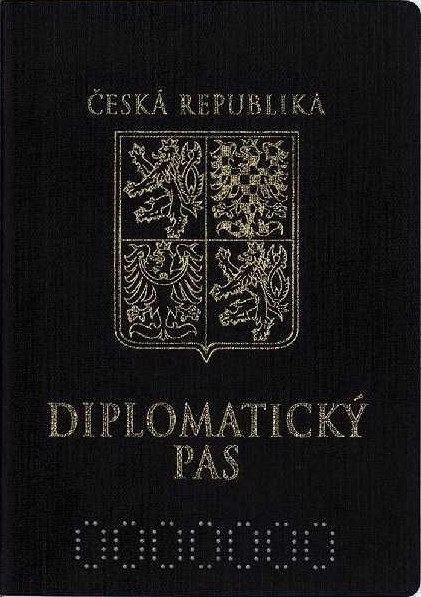
Cover

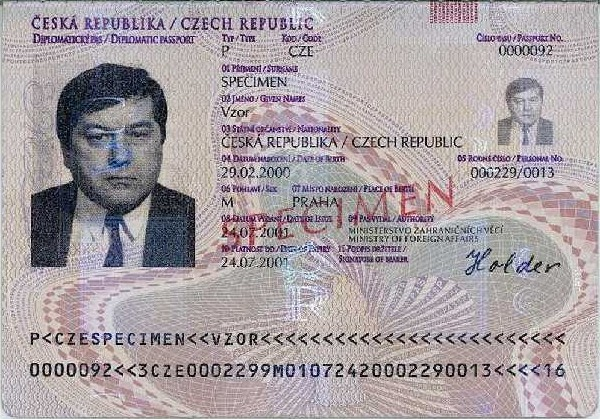
Data

With the entry of the Czech Republic into the European Union in 2004 this is no longer the current series issued.

== See also ==
- Foreign relations of the Czech Republic
- List of passports
- Passports of the European Union
- Visa requirements for Czech citizens
