= Radim Špaček =

Czech director and actor

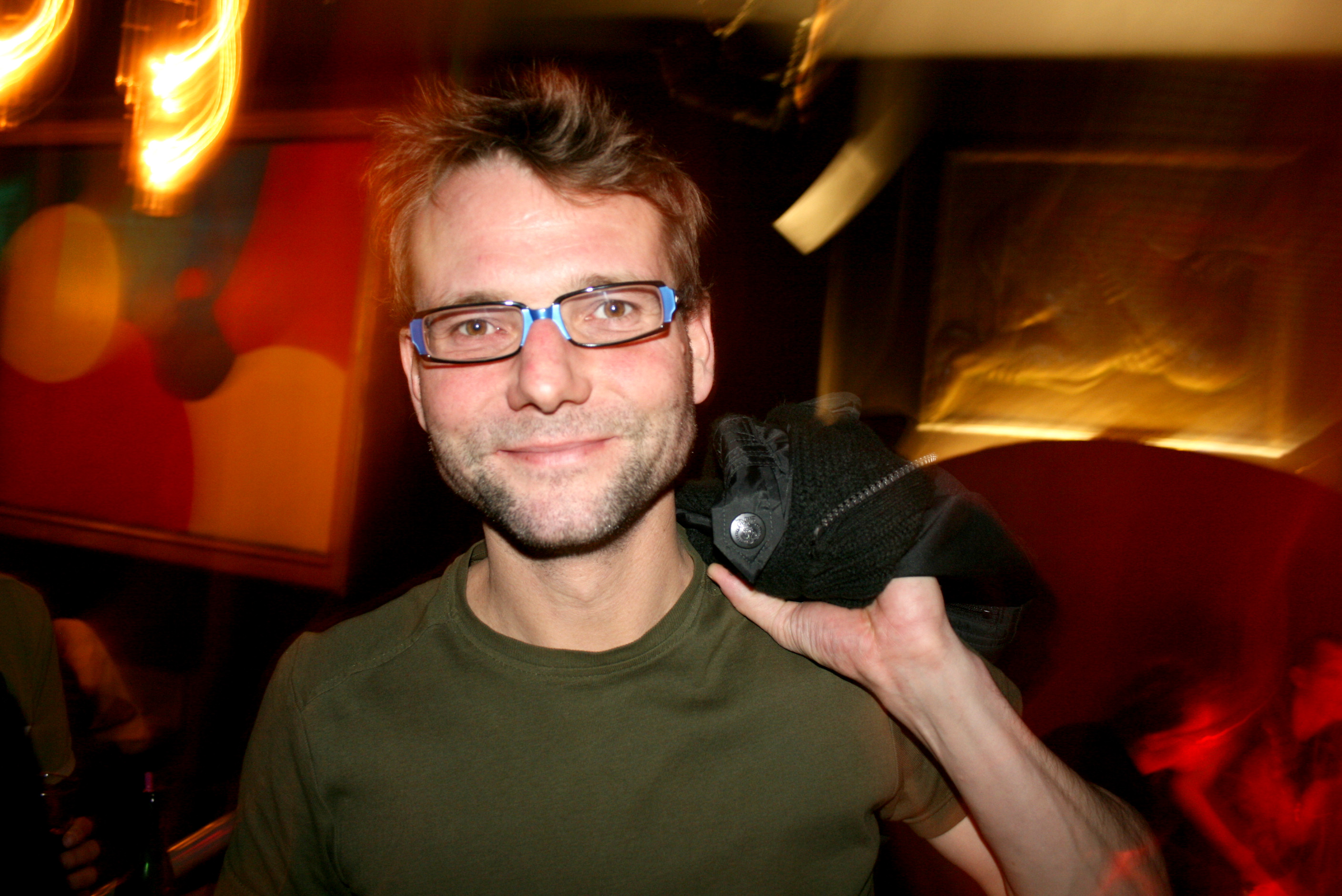
Radim Špaček in 2007

Radim Špaček (born 13 October 1973, in Ostrava) is a Czech director, producent and actor best known for film Walking Too Fast. He is the only director who has received both Czech Lion and Fluffy Lion. His father Ladislav Špaček is an Etiquette expert, journalist and former Spokesperson of Václav Havel.

== Biography ==
Hegraduated at Film and TV School of the Academy of Performing Arts in Prague. His debut was 1998 film Rapid Eye Movement which received Fluffy Lion an atiaward for the worst Czech film of the year. After this film he directed multiple documentary programmes. He also worked with his father on a television programme Etiquette.

He made his next film Walking Too Fast in 2013. The film has received multiple Czech Lion Awards including the one for the best Czech film of the year.

== Filmography ==
=== Films ===
| Year | Film | Genre | Notes |
|---|---|---|---|
| 1998 | Rapid Eye Movement | Experimental | Fluffy Lion |
| 2010 | Walking Too Fast | Thriller | 5 Czech Lion Awards |
| 2014 | Places | Drama | |
| 2018 | Golden Sting | Sport romantic drama | |
| 2023 | In the Pines | Crime film | Based on a case of real-life serial killer Viktor Kalvoda. |
