= Identity Card (2010 film) =

2010 Czech comedy film

- Directed by: Ondřej Trojan
- Written by: Petr Jarchovský
- Produced by: Ondřej Trojan
- Starring: Aňa Geislerová; Martin Myšička; Marek Taclík; Jiří Macháček
- Cinematography: Martin Štrba
- Edited by: Vladimír Barák
- Release date: 21 October 2010
- Running time: 137 minutes
- Country: Czech Republic
- Language: Czech

Identity Card (Czech: Občanský průkaz) is a 2010 Czech comedy film by Ondřej Trojan based on a story by Petr Šabach. The film premiered on 21 October 2010.

The story, which takes place in Prague in the years 1974–77, tells about a group of fellow students: Peter (Petr), Cinderella (Popelka), Ales (Aleš) and Mita (Míťa). The film begins when Peter receives his identity card on his fifteenth birthday.
