= Radim Procházka =

Czech film producer, scriptwriter and director

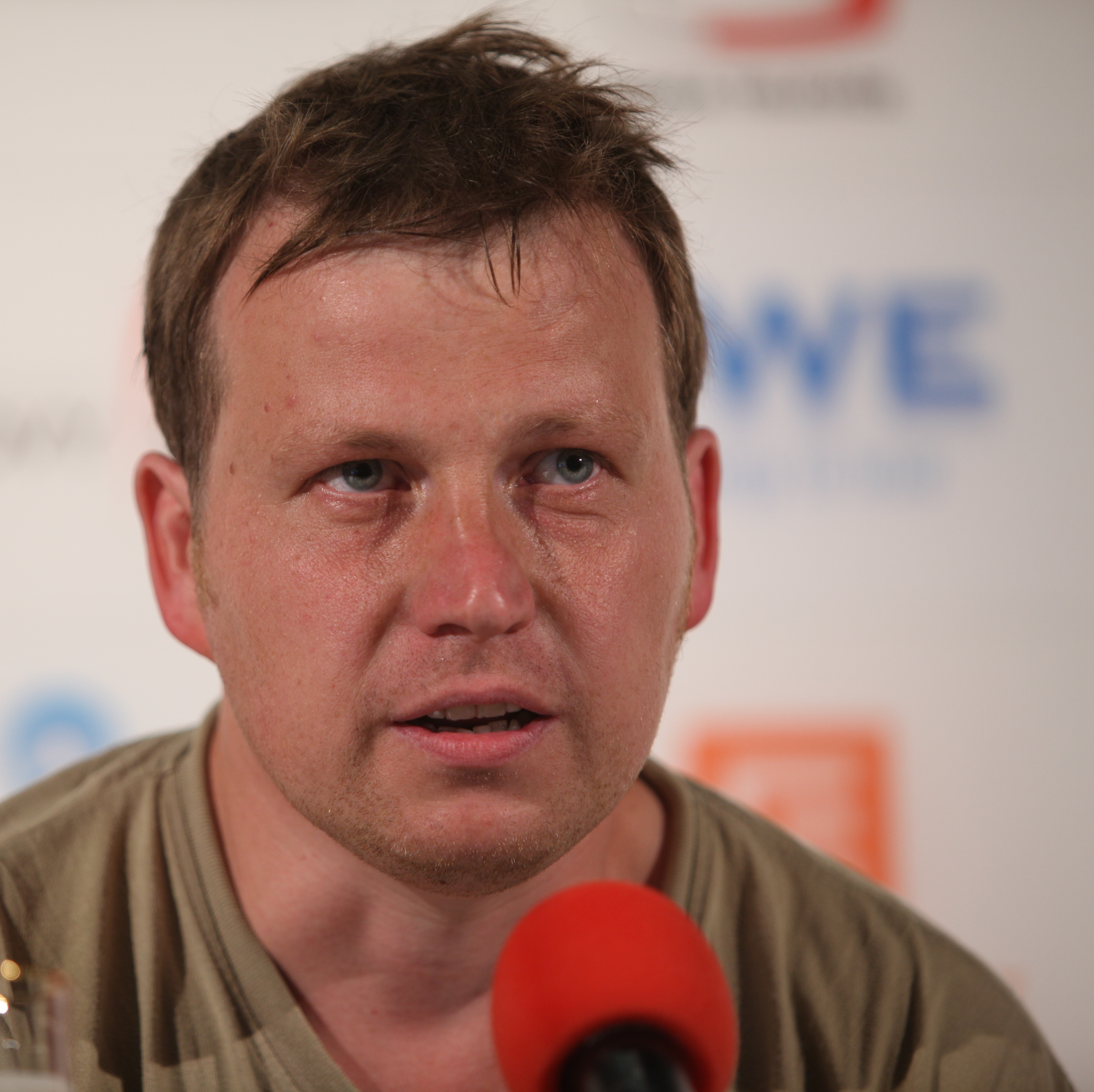
- Born: 22 January 1975 (age 51); Vyškov, Czechoslovakia
- Citizenship: Czech Republic
- Education: Film and TV School of the Academy of Performing Arts in Prague
- Occupations: film producer and director, professor

Radim Procházka (born 22 January 1975) is a Czech film producer, scriptwriter, director and mentor at Film and TV School of the Academy of Performing Arts in Prague.

== Life ==
Procházka was born in Vyškov, Czechoslovakia. He graduated in mass media communication at Faculty of Social Science at Charles University Prague, and in 2006 he finished his MGA in documentary filmmaking at the Documentary Department at Film and TV School of the Academy of Performing Arts (FAMU), Prague. His graduate film called Krejča za branou portrays theatre director Otomar Krejča.

== Work ==
Prochazka is known as a documentary filmmaker, as well as a documentary film producer and consultant. He participated in several producers incubator programmes, such as Producers on the Move at Cannes Film Festival or Emerging Producers at Jihlava International Documentary Film Festival.

=== Film producer ===
For almost 20 years, he worked with a filmmaker of the Czechoslovak New Wave, film director and auteur Karel Vachek, whose last opus magnum, Communism and the Net premiered at the IFF Rotterdam in January 2020. He produced all his three feature documentary films since 2006: Záviš, the Prince of Pornofolk (2006), Obscurantist and His Lineage or The Pyramids' Tearful Valleys (2011) and Communism and the Net (2020). His retrospective work for Karel Vachek consisted also of publishing all his feature films as a special collection on DVD and participation on a monograph book co-written by Martin Švoma. As a producer, Prochazka is responsible for over 20 feature films, documentaries and cross-genre films e.g. mockumentaries (specially early works of Robert Sedláček). For many of these productions Prochazka received Czech and international awards. Since 2013 he focuses on international co-productions and films by debut-making directors. One of the most acclaimed coproduction films was Tomáš Kratochvíl's Pongo Calling about a Roma lorry driver and activist. In 2022, Prochazka's films premiered at big festivals such as Sheffield DocFest, Karlovy Vary IFF, and Jihlava IDFF. In 2019, he founded a new company, Kuli Film, as a professional background for his mostly arthouse animated, documentary, and feature films. In 2024, he released a puppet short by Jan Cechl, Lawrence of Moravia, in a Czech-Portuguese co-production and a live action short by Lukáš Masner, The Price of a Story (Cena příběhu), the first Czech-Greenlandic co-production for which Icelandic composer Kjartan Holm composed the music.

=== Film director ===
His latest directorial effort, the experimental site-specific film collage Sanitation (2022), was created for the super-wide screen of the Prague Center for Architecture and Urban Planning (CAMP), where it was premiered in February 2022. He collaborated on it with editor Jan Daňhel and music composer Michal Rataj. With Robin Kvapil, Procházka co-directed the film We Can Do Better, which opened the IDFF Jihlava 2018. It captures the presidential election campaign of Michal Horáček from the point of view of the candidate adviser.

== Other activities ==
In 2021, he defended his dissertation, for which he gained his PhD, with a piece entitled Festival work as a reference of the quality of Czech films: autoethnography of a producer in the filmmaking field. He is a member of the European Film Academy and ACE Producer 20/21. Since 2012, he has been a mentor in directing courses at the international department of Prague's film school FAMU. Prochazka also publishes articles and books about documentary films, including online revue on docs, DokRevue.

== Filmography ==
=== Documentary ===
Year	Title	Director	Producer	Notes
2005	Krejča za branou	Yes	Yes	
2006	Záviš, kníže pornofolku pod vlivem Griffinovy Intolerance a Tatiho prázdnin pana Hulota aneb vznik a zánik Československa (1918–1992)	No	Yes	
2007	Papírový atentát	Yes	Yes	
2009	Náš první hospodář	Yes	Yes	
2009	V hlavní roli Gustáv Husák	No	Yes	
2010	Drnovické catenaccio aneb Cesta do pravěku ekonomické transformace	Yes	Yes	
2011	Tmář a jeho rod aneb Slzavé údolí pyramid	No	Yes	
2012	Pupek Nebe	Yes	No	
2012	Křehká identita	No	Yes	
2013	Čí je moje dítě?	Yes	Yes	
2017	Planeta Česko	No	Yes	
2018	Máme na víc	No	Yes	
2018	Neklidná hranice	No	Yes	
2019	Efekt Vašulka	No	Yes	
2019	Komunismus a síť aneb Konec zastupitelské demokracie	No	Yes	
2022	Planeta Praha	No	Yes	
2022	Pongo Calling	No	Yes	

=== Feature film ===
Year		Title	Director	Producer	Notes
2006	The Rules of Lies	Pravidla lži	No	Yes	
2010	Biggest of the Czechs	Největší z Čechů	No	Yes	
2011	Long Live the Family!	Rodina je základ státu	No	Yes	
2014	Schmitke	Schmitke	No	Yes	
2015	Road to Rome	Cesta do Říma	No	Yes	
2015	Dust	Prach	No	Yes	
2021	Year Before the War	Rok před válkou	No	Yes	
2022	á-B-C-D-é-F-G-H-CH-í-JONESTOWN	á-B-C-D-é-F-G-H-CH-í-JONESTOWN	No	Yes	

=== Animated / short film ===
Year	Title	Director	Producer	Type	Notes
2017	Vánoční svatba sněhuláka Karla	No	Yes	Animated	
2019	První akční hrdina	No	Yes	Short feature	
2020	Terezínské stíny	No	Yes	Animated	
2022	Asanace	Yes	Yes	Short documentary	Experimental film
2022	Barcarole	No	Yes	Short feature	
2022	Gregor Mendel a tajemství hrášku	No	Yes	Animated	
2024	Lawrence z Morávie	No	Yes	Animated	
2024	Cena Příběhu	No	Yes	Short feature	
