= Ondřej Štindl =

Czechoslovak writer

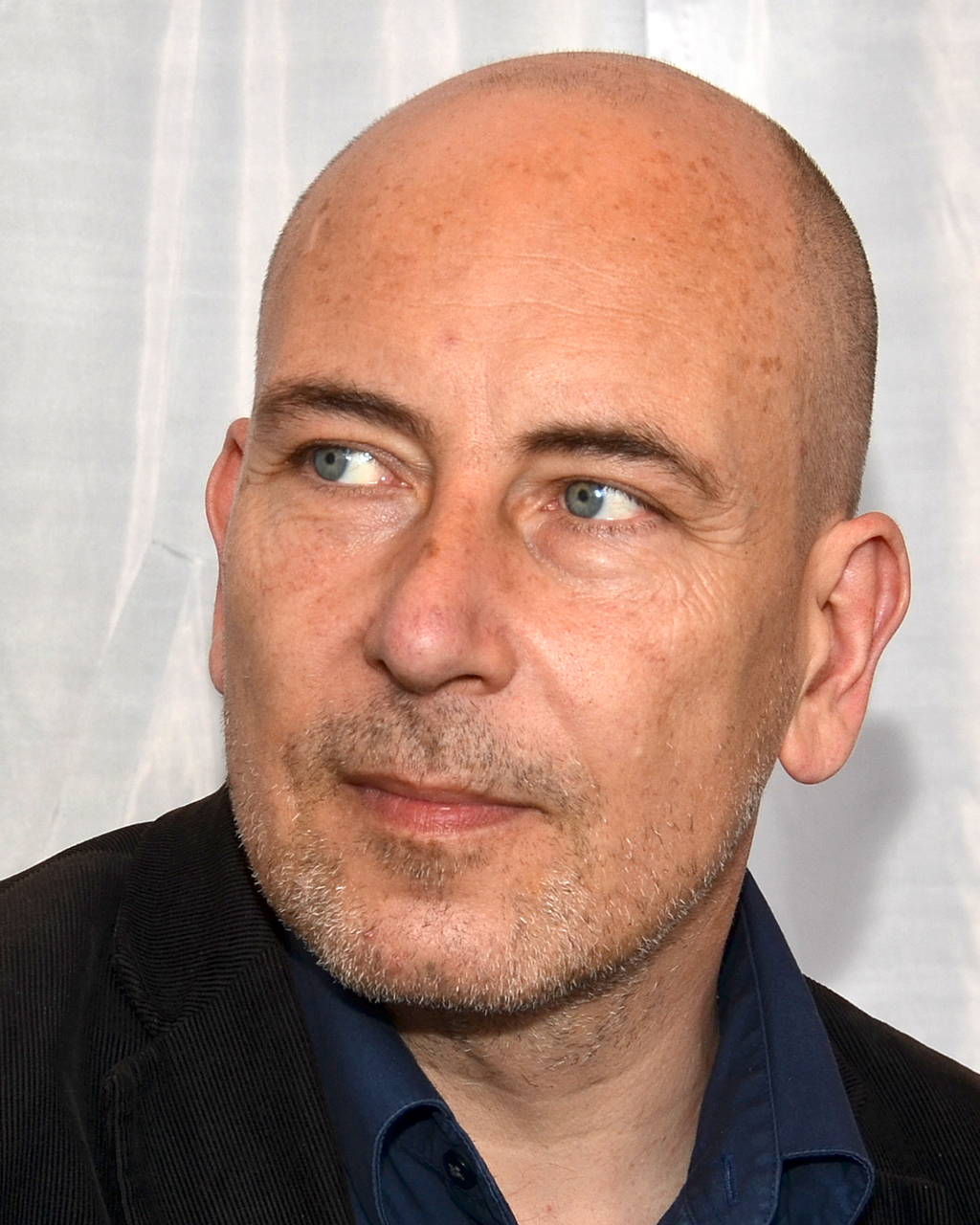
Ondřej Štindl (2017)

Ondřej Štindl (born 1966) is a Czech journalist, novelist and screenwriter. He has won major prizes for his endeavours in all three fields: the Ferdinand Peroutka Prize for journalism, the Czech Lion Prize for his screenplays, and the European Union Prize for Literature for his novel So Much Ash.

== Selected works ==
- Pouta (Walking Too Fast), screenplay
- Mondschein (2012), novel
- K hranici (To the Border, 2016), novel
- Až se ti zatočí hlava (Until Your Head Starts Spinning, 2020) novel
- Tolik popela (So Much Ash, 2022), novel
