= České filmové nebe =

Czech and Slovak film aggregate website

České filmové nebe (ČFN) (lit. 'Czech Movie Heaven') was a Czech film website founded in 1995 by Radek Vetešník and Petr Herudek to be a comprehensive database of Czech and Slovak language movies, covering the whole history of Czech film since the silent era.

As of September 2006, 5,421 movies and 23,154 people had been recorded. In 2009, the entire database was renamed Kinobox.cz.

== See also ==
- List of films made in First Republic of Czechoslovakia
