= Simona Babčáková =

Czech actress (born 1973)

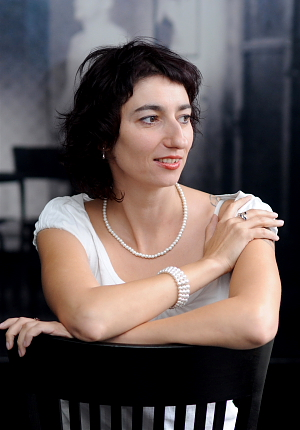
- Babčáková in 2011
- Born: 21 February 1973 (age 52); Šumperk, Czechoslovakia
- Occupation: Actress
- Years active: 2003–present
- Website: babcakova.cz

Simona Babčáková (born 21 February 1973) is a Czech actress.

== Life and career ==
Babčáková graduated from the Zlín School of Art. She first performed at the Zlín Municipal Theatre and later went on to work at Prague's Divadlo v Dlouhé and Dejvické divadlo. She has twice been nominated for an Alfréd Radok Award.

She has appeared in numerous films, including Shameless (2008) and Alois Nebel (2011), as well television series, such as Comeback (2008–2011) and Ohnivý kuře (2016–2018).

In 2021, together with Martin Prágr, she participated in the eleventh season of the reality series StarDance.

== Selected filmography ==
=== Film ===
List of film appearances, with year, title, and role shown
Year	Title	Role	Notes
2003	Boredom in Brno	Simona B.	
2008	František je děvkař		
2008	Shameless	Zuzana	
2008	I'm All Good	Jitka	
2010	Největší z Čechů	Producer	
2011	Long Live the Family!	Lenka	
2011	Alois Nebel	Berta	
2012	In the Shadow	Researcher	

=== Television ===
List of television appearances, with year, title, and role shown
Year	Title	Role	Notes
2004	Místo nahoře	Professor	4 episodes
2005–2008	Dobrá čtvrť	Gábina	9 episodes
2006	Místo v životě	Professor	2 episodes
2008–2011	Comeback	Simona Bůčková	48 episodes
2010	Poste restante	Morávková	6 episodes
2011	Kriminálka Anděl		1 episode
2014	Čtvrtá hvězda	Jiřina	12 episodes
2014	Neviditelní	Commissioner Jará	12 episodes
2016–2018	Ohnivý kuře	Renáta Tréblová	100 episodes
2019	Zkáza Dejvického divadla	Herself	5 episodes
