= Největší z Čechů =

2010 Czech drama film

- Directed by: Robert Sedláček
- Written by: Robert Sedláček
- Produced by: Radim Procházka
- Starring: Simona Babčáková; Jaroslav Plesl; Jiří Vyorálek; Johana Švarcová; Igor Bareš
- Cinematography: Petr Kozlovský
- Edited by: Matouš Outrata
- Release date: 26 August 2010
- Running time: 94 minutes
- Country: Czech Republic
- Language: Czech

Největší z Čechů (English: The Largest of the Czechs) is a 2010 Czech drama film by Robert Sedláček. The story is about a team of four filmmakers.

Set in Pelhřimov, the film was shot during the Festival of Records and Curiosities. The film began shooting in August 2009, also filming in Prague on Střelecký Island.
