= Czech national identity card =

National identity card of The Czech Republic

Czech national identity card (Občanský průkaz)
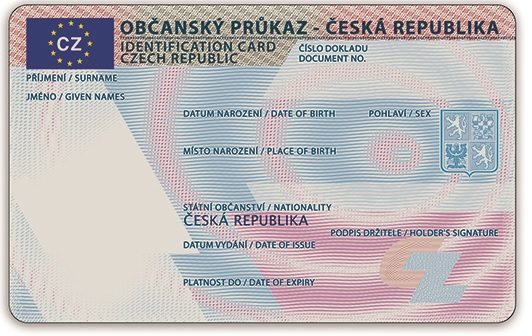
- The new ID1 format Czech identity card (with chip)
- Type: Identity card, optional replacement for passport in the listed countries
- Issued by: Czech Republic
- First issued: 2 August 2021
- Valid in: EFTA; European Union; United Kingdom (EU Settlement Scheme); Rest of Europe (except Belarus, Russia, and Ukraine) Georgia; Montserrat (max. 14 days); Overseas France
- Expiration: 10 years (age 15–70); 5 years (age under 15); 35 years (age over 70)

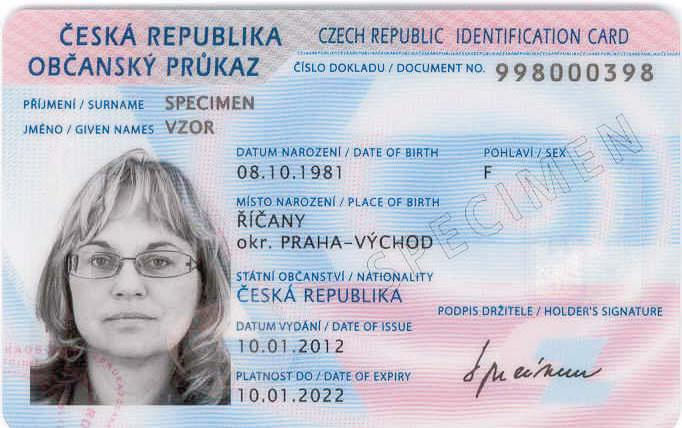
The ID1 format Czech identity card (issued until August 2021)

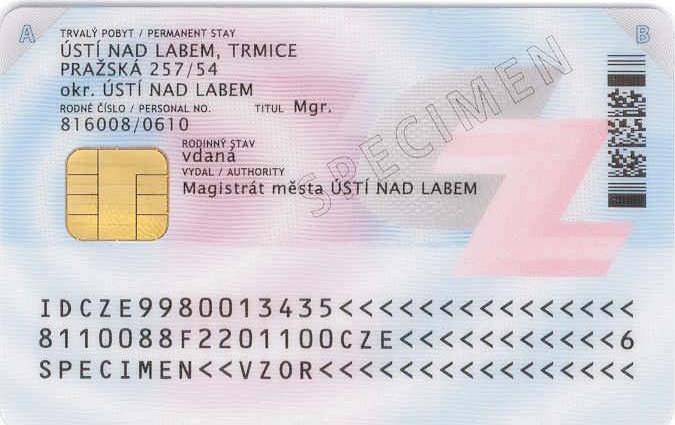
The reverse of the ID1 format Czech identity card (issued until August 2021)

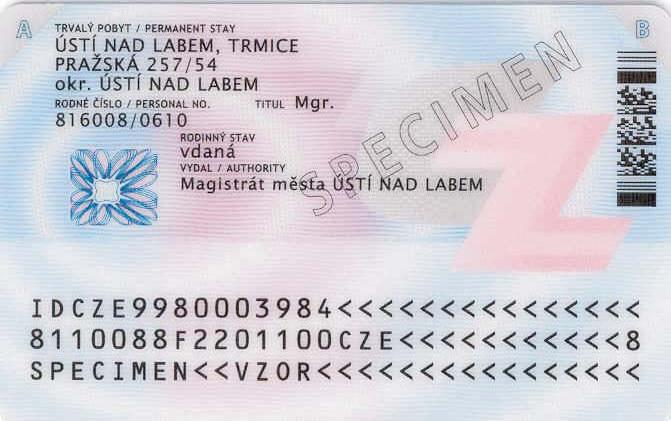
The reverse of the new ID1 format Czech identity card - version without chip (issued until August 2021)

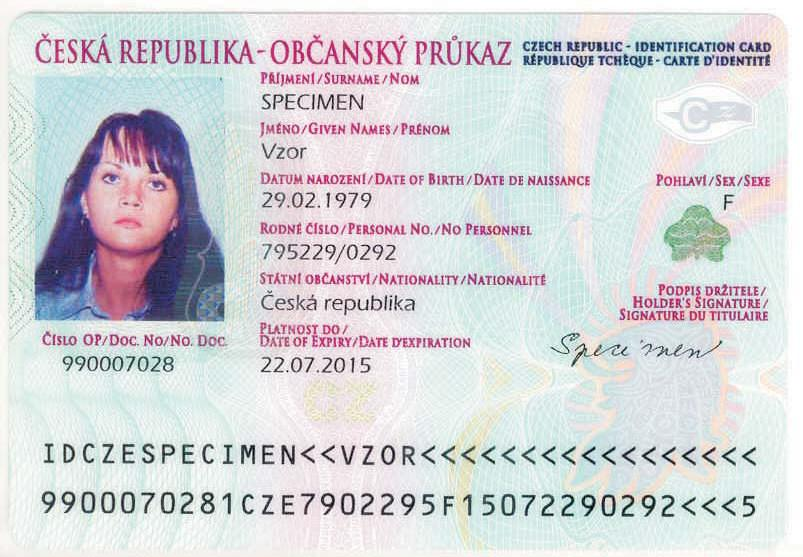
The front of old Czech identity card

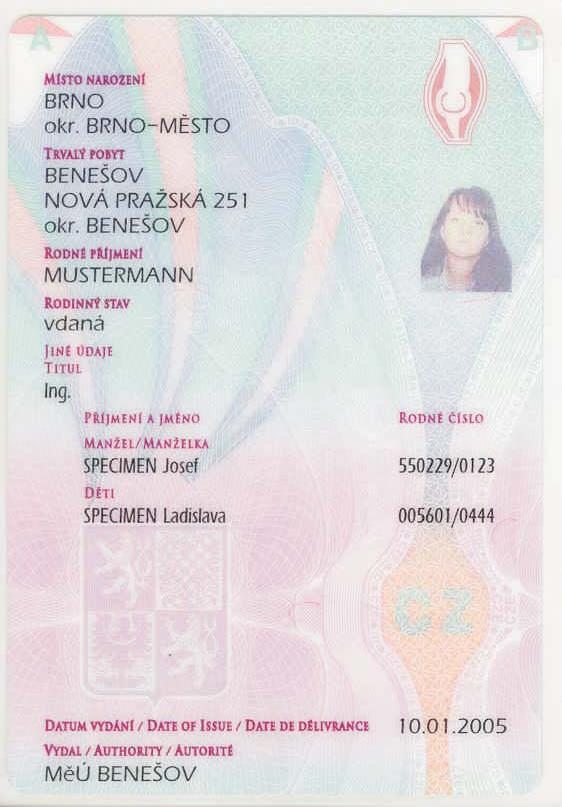
The reverse of old Czech identity card

The Czech national identity card (Czech: občanský průkaz, citizen card, literally civic certificate; Czech pronunciation: [ˈoptʃanskiː ˈpruːkas]) is the identity document used in the Czech Republic (and formerly in Czechoslovakia), in addition to the Czech passport. It is issued to all citizens, and every person above 15 years of age permanently living in the Czech Republic is required by law to hold a valid identity card.

It is possible to use the ID card instead of a passport for travel within European Union or Schengen Area and to some other states (Albania, Bosnia and Herzegovina, Montenegro, Georgia, North Macedonia, Moldova, Serbia) and organized tours to Tunisia, but not to Belarus, Russia, and Ukraine.

== History ==
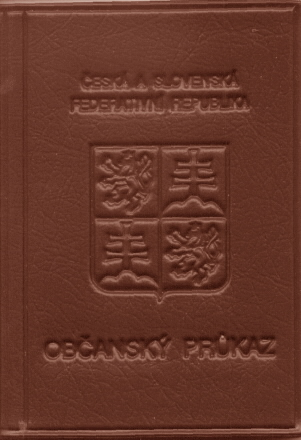
A 1991 průkaz booklet from the ČSFR.

The first mandatory identity document was introduced during the German occupation on 17 March 1939, in a decree made by Reichsprotektor Konstantin von Neurath. This document was based on the model of a similar document already in use in the Third Reich and included a photograph. Known as a legitimace, it was often nicknamed kennkarta (after the German Kennkarte).

During the communist regime (1948–1989) this simple card developed into a booklet dozens of pages long. It contained such personal details as employment history and vaccination records.

== Requirements ==
To acquire the machine-readable version of the card, a citizen must present either a currently valid card (in case of renewals), or a currently valid passport, or a birth certificate and proof of citizenship. A photograph is made at the premises of the issuing authority; the form is filled out by an employee of the issuing authority and only requires the signature of the applicant.

To acquire the non-machine-readable version, a citizen must present a filled out application, two photographs, and either a currently valid card (in case of renewals) or a birth certificate and proof of citizenship.

== Photograph ==
The photograph must be 35 by 45 millimetres (1.4 by 1.8 in), depict the current appearance of the individual in civilian clothes, show the person looking forwards with the distance from the eyes to the chin at least 13 millimetres (0.51 in), without dark glasses (except the blind), without any head cover (except for health or religious reasons, which may not cover the face in a way that makes the person difficult to distinguish). The photograph must be smooth.

The person on the photo is required to have their eyes opened, mouth closed and keep their facial expression neutral.

== Data included ==
=== Front side ===
- Card ID
- Surname
- First name
- Date of birth
- Nationality (Česká republika)
- Date of expiration

=== Reverse ===
- Place of birth
- Identity number
- Permanent address
- Birth name
- Other data
- Issuing authority and date of issue

The following information is printed if requested by the applicant (who must provide proof if necessary):

- Academic degree (issued until 2021 new design).

The following information is printed unless the applicant explicitly opts out:

- Marital status/Registered partnership

The top left (A) and top right (B) corners may be cut off. The top left (A) corner is cut off in case of permanent stay change. The top right (B) corner is cut off in case of any other personal data change (name, surname, sex, marital status etc.). A yellow piece of paper stating what information have changed should be presented with the identity card until a new identity card with correct data is issued. The identity card with one of those corners cut off is still a valid identity card.

=== Contactless chip ===
- Two fingerprints
- Color photograph

The contactless chip follows the ICAO standard for biometric passports and is only present on cards issued from August 2021.

== See also ==
- National identity cards in the European Union
- Czech passport
