= StarDance (Czech TV series) =

Czech television dance contest

- Genre: Reality competition
- Based on: Strictly Come Dancing
- Directed by: Vít Bělohradský (14–); Jan Fronc (12–13); Roman Petrenko (1–11)
- Presented by: Marek Eben (1–); Tereza Kostková (1–)
- Judges: Zdeněk Chlopčík (1–12, 14–); Tatiana Drexler (2–); Richard Genzer (10–); Jana Burkiewiczová (14–); Jan Tománek (10–11, 13); Radek Balaš (6–9); Václav Kuneš (9); Jan Révai (5–8); Eva Bartuňková (1, 5); Petr Zuska (4); Petra Kostovčíková (4); Jaroslav Kuneš (3); Leona Kvasnicová (3); Richard Hes (2); Mahulena Bočanová (2); Vlastimil Harapes (1); Michael Kocáb (1)
- Narrated by: Viktor Preiss (6–); Otakar Brousek (1–5)
- Country of origin: Czech Republic
- Original language: Czech
- No. of seasons: 14

Production
- Production location: Prague
- Running time: 60–80 minutes

Original release
- Network: Czech Television
- Release: November 6, 2006 – present

StarDance... Když hvězdy tančí (lit. 'StarDance... When Stars Dance') is the Czech version of the British reality TV competition Strictly Come Dancing and part of the Dancing with the Stars franchise. Thirteen seasons were broadcast by Czech Television, hosted by Marek Eben and Tereza Kostková.

A ninth season aired in summer 2018 with ten celebrities competing. StarDance is among the most viewed Czech television programmes with 1.48 million viewers in average in 2018.

On 14 September 2026, original hosts Tereza Kostková and Marek Eben announced that after twenty years of hosting StarDance, they decided to not continue after the 14th season.

A fourteenth season was announced in 2026 with these celebrities:

- Singer Marta Jandová
- Actress Sara Sandeva
- Singer, actor Tom Sean
- Tennis player Radek Štěpánek
- Stunt performer Hana Dvorská
- Actor Tomáš Matonoha
- Actress Luciana Tomášová
- Singer Tomáš Polák
- Actress Petra Nesvačilová
- Singer, actor Vojtěch Dyk

== Judging panel ==
Key
Judging panel
Guest judge(s)

Judge	Series 1	Series 2	Series 3	Series 4	Series 5	Series 6	Series 7	Series 8	Series 9	Series 10	Series 11	Series 12	Series 13	Series 14
Zdeněk Chlopčík														
Tatiana Drexler														
Richard Genzer														
Jana Burkiewiczová														
Jan Tománek														
Radek Balaš														
Václav Kuneš														
Jan Révai														
Eva Bartuňková														
Petr Zuska														
Petra Kostovčíková														
Jaroslav Kuneš														
Leona Kvasnicová														
Richard Hes														
Mahulena Bočanová														
Vlastimil Harapes														
Michael Kocáb														

== Professional dancers and their partners ==
Professional	Series 1	Series 2	Series 3	Series 4	Series 5	Series 6	Series 7	Series 8	Series 9	Series 10	Series 11	Series 12	Series 13	Series 14
Adriana Mašková	—N/a									Miroslav Hanuš	Jan Cina	Josef Maršálek	Filip Blažek	Tomáš Polák
Albina Zaytseva	—N/a		David Suchařípa	—N/a										
Alice Stodůlková	—N/a			Pavel Kříž	—N/a	Matěj Ruppert	—N/a		Dalibor Gondik	—N/a				
Andrea Třeštíková	—N/a							Roman Zach	—N/a				Ondřej Ruml	—N/a
Daniel Kecskeméti	—N/a											Tereza Mašková	—N/a	
Dominik Vodička	—N/a									Veronika Khek Kubařová	Tereza Černochová	Darija Pavlovičová	Martina Ptáčková	—N/a
Dominika Rošková	—N/a											Richard Krajčo	—N/a	
Eduard Zubák	Helena Zeťová	—N/a												
Eva Krejčířová	—N/a		Jaromír Bosák	—N/a		Ondřej Brzobohatý	—N/a	Ladislav Vízek / Ondřej Bank	—N/a					
Iva Langerová	—N/a	Aleš Valenta	—N/a											
Jakub Mazůch	—N/a											Eva Adamczyková	Ta Thuy Dung	—N/a
Jana Zelenková	—N/a								Richard Genzer	—N/a				
Jan Halíř	—N/a	Monika Žídková	—N/a											
Jan Kliment	—N/a		Zuzana Norisová	—N/a										
Jan Kohout	—N/a									Nora Fridrichová	—N/a			
Jan Onder	—N/a		Dana Batulková	—N/a	Kateřina Baďurová	Taťána Kuchařová	—N/a							
Jan Tománek	Jolana Voldánová	—N/a			Pavlína Němcová	Šárka Kašpárková	—N/a					Ivana Chýlková	—N/a	
Jaroslav Kuneš	Mahulena Bočanová	—N/a												
Jiří Hein	—N/a				Dana Morávková	—N/a								
Jitka Šorfová	—N/a			Alexander Hemala	—N/a	Imrich Bugár	—N/a							
Kamila Tománková	Tomáš Dvořák	—N/a			Oldřich Navrátil	—N/a		Ondřej Bank	—N/a					
Karolína Majerníková	—N/a			Saša Rašilov	—N/a									
Katarína Štumpfová	—N/a						Leoš Mareš	—N/a						
Kateřina Bartuněk Hrstková	—N/a											Vavřinec Hradilek	Oskar Hes	—N/a
Kateřina Krakowková	—N/a								Adam Mišík	—N/a				
Kristýna Coufalová	Roman Vojtek	—N/a									Tomáš Verner	—N/a		
Laura Klimentová	—N/a		Vladimír Kratina	—N/a										
Lenka Tvrzová	—N/a		Bohouš Josef	—N/a										
Lenka Nora Návorková	—N/a								Jiří Dvořák	—N/a	Mirai Navrátil	Marek Adamczyk	Jiří Ježek	Tomáš Matonoha
Lucie Hunčárová	—N/a					Pavel Řezníček	Lukáš Pavlásek	Emanuele Ridi	—N/a					
Lucia Krnčanová	—N/a				Petr Bende	—N/a								
Lukáš Bartuněk	—N/a					Jitka Hosprová	—N/a						Lucie Vondráčková	—N/a
Lukáš Hojdan	—N/a			Jitka Čvančarová	—N/a									
Marek Dědík	—N/a			Veronika Žilková	—N/a		Jitka Schneiderová	Olga Šípková	Pavla Tomicová	—N/a	Martina Viktorie Kopecká	—N/a		
Marek Hrstka	—N/a							Anna K	—N/a					
Marek Zelinka	—N/a						Marie Doležalová	—N/a						
Markéta Dostálová	—N/a									Ondřej Ládek	—N/a			
Martin Prágr	—N/a									Gabriela Soukalová	Simona Babčáková	Iva Kubelková	Marta Dancingerová	Marta Jandová
Martina Marková	—N/a						Marek Taclík	—N/a						
Michal Kostovčík	—N/a		Iva Frühlingová	—N/a										
Michal Mladek	—N/a								Daniela Písařovicová	—N/a				
Michal Necpál	—N/a		Jana Doleželová	—N/a			Leona Machálková	Miluše Bittnerová	Veronika Arichteva	—N/a	Andrea Sestini Hlaváčková	—N/a		
Michael Petr	—N/a	Lenka Filipová	—N/a											
Michaela Nováková	—N/a									Jakub Vágner	—N/a			
Michal Bureš	—N/a									Tonya Graves	—N/a			
Michal Kurtiš	—N/a			Aneta Langerová	—N/a	Anna Polívková	Lucie Dvořáková	—N/a						Hana Dvorská
Michal Němeček	—N/a	Štěpánka Hilgertová	—N/a											
Michal Padevět	—N/a							Jana Plodková	Daniela Šinkorová	—N/a				
Natálie Otáhalová	—N/a									Matouš Ruml	—N/a			Tom Sean
Petr Čadek	—N/a	Tatiana Vilhelmová	—N/a				Kateřina Cajthamlová	—N/a						
Petra Kostovčíková	Václav Vydra	—N/a												
Robin Ondráček	—N/a								Monika Bagárová	—N/a	Marika Šoposká	—N/a	Jana Paulová	Luciana Tomášová
Romana Motlová	—N/a						Rostislav Osička	—N/a						
Simona Svrčková	—N/a	Jiří Schmitzer	—N/a		David Švehlík	—N/a								
Tereza Bufková	Jan Čenský	—N/a			Martin Procházka	—N/a	Radek Banga	—N/a			Zdeněk Godla	—N/a	Patrik Hartl	—N/a
Tomáš Vořechovský	—N/a									Radka Třeštíková	—N/a			
Václav Masaryk	—N/a			Monika Absolonová	Barbora Poláková	—N/a		Kristýna Leichtová	—N/a					
Vanda Dětinská	—N/a	Robert Záruba	—N/a											Radek Štěpánek
Veronika Lálová	—N/a							Zdeněk Piškula	David Svoboda	—N/a	Pavel Trávníček	—N/a		
Veronika Lišková	—N/a									Karel "Kovy" Kovář	—N/a			
Veronika Šmiková	—N/a			Filip Sajler	—N/a									
Zdeněk Fenčák	Jana Švandová	—N/a												
Zuzana Dvořáková Šťastná	—N/a											David Prachař	—N/a	
Daniel Makovec	—N/a													Sara Prachař Sandeva
Filip Hudlický	—N/a													Petra Nesvačilová
Catharina Málek	—N/a													Vojtěch Dyk

Key:

Winner of the series
Second place of the series
Third place of the series
First elimination of the series
Withdrew in the series
Elimination of the series (2nd to last)

== Series overview ==
Season	No. of stars	No. of weeks	Duration dates	Partners in the finals		
Season	No. of stars	No. of weeks	Duration dates	First place	Second place	Third place
1) Fall 2006	8	8	Nov 4 – Dec 23	Roman Vojtek & Kristýna Coufalová	Václav Vydra & Petra Kostovčíková	Tomáš Dvořák & Kamila Tománková
2) Fall 2007	8	8	Nov 4 – Dec 23	Aleš Valenta & Iva Langerová	Tatiana Vilhelmová & Petr Čadek	Jiří Schmitzer & Simona Švrčková
3) Fall 2008	8	8	Nov 1 – Dec 20	Dana Batulková & Jan Onder	Zuzana Norisová & Jan Kliment	Jaromír Bosák & Eva Krejčířová
4) Fall 2010	8	8	Oct 30 – Dec 18	Pavel Kříž & Alice Stodůlková	Aneta Langerová & Michal Kurtiš	Monika Absolonová & Václav Masaryk
5) Fall 2012	8	8	Nov 3 – Dec 22	Kateřina Baďurová & Jan Onder	Martin Procházka & Tereza Bufková	David Švehlík & Simona Švrčková
6) Fall 2013	8	8	Nov 2 – Dec 21	Anna Polívková & Michal Kurtiš	Taťána Kuchařová & Jan Onder	Imrich Bugár & Jitka Šorfová
7) Fall 2015	10	10	Oct 17 – Dec 19	Marie Doležalová & Marek Zelinka	Jitka Schneiderová & Marek Dědík	Lukáš Pavlásek & Lucie Hunčárová
8) Fall 2016	10	10	Oct 8 – Dec 10	Zdeněk Piškula & Veronika Lálová	Ondřej Bank & Eva Krejčířová	Jana Plodková & Michal Padevět
9) Fall 2018	10	10	Oct 13 – Dec 15	Jiří Dvořák & Lenka Nora Návorková	Pavla Tomicová & Marek Dědík	David Svoboda & Veronika Lálová
10) Fall 2019	10	10	Oct 12 – Dec 14	Veronika Khek Kubařová & Dominik Vodička	Matouš Ruml & Natálie Otáhalová	Jakub Vágner & Michaela Nováková
11) Fall 2021	10	10	Oct 16 – Dec 18	Jan Cina & Adriana Mašková	Martina Viktorie Kopecká & Marek Dědík	Tomáš Verner & Kristýna Coufalová
12) Fall 2023	10	10	Oct 14 – Dec 16	Darija Pavlovičová & Dominik Vodička	Eva Adamczyková & Jakub Mazůch	Vavřinec Hradilek & Kateřina Bartuněk Hrstková
13) Fall 2024	10	10	Oct 12 – Dec 14	Oskar Hes & Kateřina Bartuněk Hrstková	Marta Dancingerová & Martin Prágr	Lucie Vondráčková & Lukáš Bartuňek
14) Fall 2026	10	10	Oct 10 – Dec 12	TBD	TBD	TBD

=== Highest-scoring celebrities ===
The scores presented below represent the best overall accumulative average scores the celebrity gained each season (seasons 1–11).

Rank	Season	Place	Celebrity	Professional	Average score
1	8	Champion	Zdeněk Piškula	Veronika Lálová	36.2
1	6	Runner-up	Taťána Kuchařová	Jan Onder	36.2
2	11	Runner-up	Tomáš Verner	Kristýna Coufalová	36.1
3	3	Runner-up	Zuzana Norisová	Jan Kliment	36.0
4	1	Champion	Roman Vojtek	Kristýna Coufalová	35.6
4	8	7th Place	Olga Šípková	Marek Dědík	35.6
5	8	3rd Place	Jana Plodková	Michal Padevět	35.4
5	10	Runner-up	Matouš Ruml	Natálie Otáhalová	35.4
6	10	Champion	Veronika Khek Kubařová	Dominik Vodička	35.1
7	2	Champion	Aleš Valenta	Iva Langerová	35.0
8	9	Champion	Jiří Dvořák	Lenka Nora Návorková	34.9
9	11	Champion	Jan Cina	Adriana Mašková	34.5
10	2	Runner-up	Tatiana Vilhelmová	Petr Čadek	34.0
