= StarDance (Czech TV series) season 1 =

StarDance
- Season 1
- Celebrity winner: Roman Vojtek
- Professional winner: Kristýna Coufalová
- No. of episodes: 8

Release
- Original network: Česká televize
- Original release: November 4 – December 23, 2006

Season chronology
- Next → Season 2

The first season of StarDance (Czech Republic) debuted on Česká televize on November 4, 2006. Eight celebrities were paired with eight professional ballroom dancers. Marek Eben and Tereza Kostková were the hosts for this season.

== Couples ==
The eight professionals and celebrities that competed were:

Celebrity	Occupation / Known for	Professional partner	Status
Helena Zeťová	Singer	Eduard Zubák	Eliminated 1st on November 11, 2006
Jan Čenský	Actor	Tereza Bufková	Eliminated 2nd on November 18, 2006
Jana Švandová	Actress	Zdeněk Fenčák	Eliminated 3rd on November 25, 2006
Jolana Voldánová	Newsreader	Jan Tománek	Eliminated 4th on December 2, 2006
Mahulena Bočanová	Actress, Presenter	Jaroslav Kuneš	Withdrew on December 9, 2006
Tomáš Dvořák	Athlete	Kamila Tománková	Third place on December 16, 2006
Václav Vydra	Actor	Petra Kostovčíková	Runner-up on December 23, 2006
Roman Vojtek	Actor, singer	Kristýna Coufalová	Winner on December 23, 2006

== Scoring Chart ==
Couples	Place	1	2	3	4	5	6	7	8
Roman & Kristýna	1	23	27	32	38	39	34+39=73	39+40=79	37+39+40=116
Václav & Petra	2	23	20	25	31	26	33+32=65	30+32=62	37+37+40=114
Tomáš & Kamila	3	27	25	29	38	32	33+40=73	32+37=69	
Mahulena & Jaroslav	4	27	28	35	34	35			
Jolana & Jan T.	5	21	20	26	28	28			
Jana & Zdeněk	6	21	20	19	25				
Jan Č. & Tereza	7	24	30	25					
Helena & Eduard	8	21	23						

Red numbers indicate the lowest score for each week.
Green numbers indicate the highest score for each week.
indicates the couple eliminated that week.
indicates the couple that withdrew from the competition.
indicates the winning couple.
indicates the runner-up couple.

=== Average score chart ===
This table only counts for dances scored on a 40-point scale.

Rank by average	Place	Couple	Total points	Number of dances	Average
1	1	Roman & Kristýna	427	12	35.6
2	3	Tomáš & Kamila	293	9	32.6
3	4	Mahulena & Jaroslav	159	5	31.8
4	2	Václav & Petra	366	12	30.5
5	7	Jan Č. & Tereza	79	3	26.3
6	5	Jolana & Jan T.	123	5	24.6
7	8	Helena & Eduard	44	2	22.0
8	6	Jana & Zdeněk	85	4	21.3

=== Highest and lowest scoring performances ===
The best and worst performances in each dance according to the judges' 40-point scale are as follows:

Dance	Highest Scored dancer(s)	Highest score	Lowest Scored dancer(s)	Lowest score
Cha-cha-cha	Roman Vojtek	39	Jana Švandová	21
Waltz	Tomáš Dvořák	37	Helena Zeťová; Jolana Voldánová	21
Quickstep	Roman Vojtek	40	Jana Švandová; Václav Vydra	20
Rumba	Václav Vydra	37	Jolana Voldánová	20
Jive	Mahulena Bočanová	35	Jana Švandová	19
Tango	Tomáš Dvořák	40	Jan Čenský	25
Slowfox	Tomáš Dvořák	38	Jana Švandová	25
Paso Doble	Roman Vojtek	38	Jolana Voldánová	28
Samba	Roman Vojtek	39	Václav Vydra	26
Freestyle	Roman Vojtek; Václav Vydra	40	—	—

=== Couples' highest and lowest scoring dances ===
Scores are based upon a potential 40-point maximum.

Couples	Highest scoring dance(s)	Lowest scoring dance(s)
Roman & Kristýna	Quickstep & Freestyle (40)	Waltz (23)
Václav & Petra	Freestyle (40)	Quickstep (20)
Tomáš & Kamila	Tango (40)	Quickstep (25)
Mahulena & Jaroslav	Jive & Samba (35)	Cha-cha-cha (27)
Jolana & Jan T.	Paso Doble & Samba (28)	Quickstep (20)
Jana & Zdeněk	Slowfox (25)	Jive (19)
Jan Č. & Tereza	Rumba (30)	Waltz (24)
Helena & Eduard	Rumba (23)	Waltz (21)

== Dance chart ==
The celebrities and dance partners danced one of these routines for each corresponding week:

- Week 1: Cha-cha-cha or waltz
- Week 2: Rumba or quickstep
- Week 3: Jive or tango
- Week 4: Paso Doble or Slowfox
- Week 5: Samba
- Week 6: One unlearned dance
- Week 7: One unlearned dance
- Week 8: Couples' choice and freestyle

Couple	Week 1	Week 2	Week 3	Week 4	Week 5	Week 6		Week 7		Week 8		
Roman & Kristýna	Waltz	Rumba	Tango	Paso Doble	Samba	Jive	Slowfox	Cha-cha-cha	Quickstep	Tango	Samba	Freestyle
Václav & Petra	Cha-cha-cha	Quickstep	Jive	Paso Doble	Samba	Rumba	Tango	Waltz	Slowfox	Slowfox	Rumba	Freestyle
Tomáš & Kamila	Cha-cha-cha	Quickstep	Jive	Slowfox	Samba	Rumba	Tango	Paso Doble	Waltz			
Mahulena & Jaroslav	Cha-cha-cha	Quickstep	Jive	Slowfox	Samba							
Jolana & Jan T.	Waltz	Rumba	Tango	Paso Doble	Samba							
Jana & Zdeněk	Cha-cha-cha	Quickstep	Jive	Slowfox								
Jan Č. & Tereza	Waltz	Rumba	Tango									
Helena & Eduard	Waltz	Rumba										

Highest scoring dance
Lowest scoring dance
