= StarDance (Czech TV series) season 8 =

StarDance
- Season 8
- Celebrity winner: Zdeněk Piškula
- Professional winner: Veronika Lálová
- No. of episodes: 10

Release
- Original network: Česká televize
- Original release: October 8 – December 10, 2016

Season chronology
- ← Previous; Season 7 Next → Season 9

The 8th StarDance series was premiered on October 8, 2016, and ended on December 10, 2016. Hosts in this series are again Marek Eben and Tereza Kostková.

== Couples ==
The ten professionals and celebrities that competed were:

Celebrity	Occupation / Known for	Professional partner	Status	Ref.
Miluše Bittnerová	Actress	Michal Necpál	Eliminated 1st on October 15, 2016	
Ladislav Vízek	Footballer	Eva Krejčířová	Eliminated 2nd on October 22, 2016	
Olga Šípková	Sportswoman	Marek Dědík	Eliminated 3rd on October 29, 2016	
Kristýna Leichtová	Actress	Václav Masaryk	Eliminated 4th on November 5, 2016	
Anna K.	Singer	Marek Hrstka	Eliminated 5th on November 12, 2016	
Emanuele Ridi	Chef	Lucie Hunčárová	Eliminated 6th on November 26, 2016	
Roman Zach	Actor	Andrea Třeštiková	Eliminated 7th on December 3, 2016	
Jana Plodková	Actress	Michal Padevět	Third place on December 10, 2016	
Ondřej Bank	Alpine ski racer	Kamila Tománková	Runner-up on December 10, 2016	
Zdeněk Piškula	Actor	Veronika Lálová	Winner on December 10, 2016	

== Scoring Chart ==
Couples	Place	1	2	3	4	5	6	7	8	9	10
Zdeněk & Veronika	1	25	30	32	37	34	40+0=40	39	29+36=65	37+38=75	39+38+37=114
Ondřej & Kamila	2	26	21	26	26	17	40+2=42	40	27+22=49	26+24=50	30+34+40=104
Jana & Michal P.	3	27	22	29	35	40	31+2=33	39	38+31=69	33+40=73	36+40+38=114
Roman & Andrea	4	20	33	25	35	28	24+2=26	38	22+38=60	27+40=67	
Emanuele & Lucie	5	20	22	21	22	20	26+0=26	36	22+23=45		
Anna & Marek H.	6	17	31	25	31	30	31+0=31				
Kristýna & Václav	7	19	26	22	25	25					
Olga & Marek D.	8	29	38	37	32						
Ladislav & Eva	9	17	23	17							
Miluše & Michal N.	10	23	21								

Red numbers indicate the lowest score for each week.
Green numbers indicate the highest score for each week.
indicates the couple eliminated that week.
indicates the winning couple.
indicates the runner-up couple.
indicates the third place couple.

== Dance chart ==
The celebrities and dance partners danced one of these routines for each corresponding week:

Couple	Week 1	Week 2	Week 3	Week 4	Week 5	Week 6	Week 7	Week 8		Week 9		Week 10		
Zdeněk & Veronika	Cha-cha-cha	Tango	Rumba	Slowfox	Jive	Contemporary	Quickstep	Samba	Waltz	Viennese Waltz	Paso Doble	Rumba	Tango	Freestyle
Ondřej & Kamila	Waltz	Samba	Viennese Waltz	Paso Doble	Cha-cha-cha	Contemporary	Rumba	Tango	Quickstep	Jive	Slowfox	Jive	Tango	Freestyle
Jana & Michal P.	Waltz	Samba	Viennese Waltz	Paso Doble	Cha-cha-cha	Contemporary	Rumba	Tango	Quickstep	Jive	Slowfox	Cha-cha-cha	Tango	Freestyle
Roman & Andrea	Cha-cha-cha	Tango	Rumba	Slowfox	Jive	Contemporary	Quickstep	Samba	Waltz	Viennese Waltz	Paso Doble			
Emanuele & Lucie	Waltz	Samba	Viennese Waltz	Paso Doble	Cha-cha-cha	Contemporary	Rumba	Quickstep	Tango					
Anna & Marek H.	Cha-cha-cha	Tango	Rumba	Slowfox	Jive	Contemporary								
Kristýna & Václav	Waltz	Samba	Viennese Waltz	Paso Doble	Cha-cha-cha									
Olga & Marek D.	Cha-cha-cha	Tango	Rumba	Slowfox										
Ladislav & Eva	Cha-cha-cha	Tango	Rumba											
Miluše & Michal N.	Waltz	Samba												

Highest scoring dance
Lowest scoring dance
