= StarDance (Czech TV series) season 10 =

StarDance
- Season 10
- Celebrity winner: Veronika Khek Kubařová
- Professional winner: Dominik Vodička
- No. of episodes: 10

Release
- Original network: Česká televize
- Original release: October 12 – December 14, 2019

Season chronology
- ← Previous; Season 9 Next → Season 11

The 10th StarDance series was premiered on October 12, 2019, and ended on December 14, 2019. Hosts in this series are again Marek Eben and Tereza Kostková. Jury Radek Balaš was replaced by Richard Genzer, Václav Kuneš by Jan Tománek.

== Couples ==
The ten professionals and celebrities that competed were:

| Celebrity | Occupation / Known for | Professional partner | Status | Ref. |
|---|---|---|---|---|
| Nora Fridrichová | TV presenter | Jan Kohout | Eliminated 1st on October 19, 2019 | |
| Tonya Graves | Singer | Michal Bureš | Eliminated 2nd on October 26, 2019 | |
| Ondřej Ládek | Singer | Markéta Dostálová | Eliminated 3rd on November 2, 2019 | |
| Radka Třeštíková | Writer | Tomáš Vořechovský | Eliminated 4th on November 9, 2019 | |
| Miroslav Hanuš | Actor | Adriana Mašková | Eliminated 5th on November 16, 2019 | |
| Gabriela Soukalová | Biathlete | Martin Prágr | Eliminated 6th on November 30, 2019 | |
| Karel Kovář | YouTuber | Veronika Lišková | Eliminated 7th on December 7, 2019 | |
| Jakub Vágner | Fisherman | Michaela Nováková | Third place on December 14, 2019 | |
| Matouš Ruml | Actor | Natálie Otáhalová | Runner-up on December 14, 2019 | |
| Veronika Khek Kubařová | Actress | Dominik Vodička | Winner on December 14, 2019 | |

== Scoring Chart ==
| Couples | Place | 1 | 2 | 3 | 4 | 5 | 6 | 7 | 8 | 9 | 10 |
|---|---|---|---|---|---|---|---|---|---|---|---|
| Veronika K. & Dominik | 1 | 23 | 31 | 35 | 36 | 31 | 40+1=41 | 34 | 38+39=77 | 32+35=67 | 39+39+40=118 |
| Matouš & Natálie | 2 | 28 | 31 | 31 | 29 | 38 | 35+1=36 | 40 | 28+38=66 | 37+40=77 | 40+40+39=119 |
| Jakub & Michaela | 3 | 24 | 34 | 30 | 29 | 28 | 33+0=33 | 32 | 28+33=61 | 29+38=67 | 39+36+39=114 |
| Karel & Veronika L. | 4 | 29 | 29 | 23 | 31 | 34 | 29+0=29 | 35 | 28+29=57 | 33+33=66 | |
| Gabriela & Martin | 5 | 25 | 29 | 27 | 37 | 32 | 35+0=35 | 33 | 33+28=61 | | |
| Miroslav & Adriana | 6 | 26 | 34 | 26 | 23 | 34 | 27+1=28 | | | | |
| Radka & Tomáš | 7 | 19 | 28 | 26 | 23 | 26 | | | | | |
| Ondřej & Markéta | 8 | 17 | 28 | 24 | 23 | | | | | | |
| Tonya & Michal | 9 | 19 | 23 | 22 | | | | | | | |
| Nora & Jan | 10 | 21 | 24 | | | | | | | | |

Red numbers indicate the lowest score for each week.
Green numbers indicate the highest score for each week.
indicates the couple eliminated that week.
indicates the winning couple.
indicates the runner-up couple.
indicates the third place couple.

== Dance chart ==
The celebrities and dance partners danced one of these routines for each corresponding week:

| Couple | Week 1 | Week 2 | Week 3 | Week 4 | Week 5 | Week 6 | Week 7 | Week 8 | | Week 9 | | Week 10 | | |
|---|---|---|---|---|---|---|---|---|---|---|---|---|---|---|
| Veronika K. & Dominik | Samba | Waltz | Quickstep | Rumba | Jive | Tango | Cha-cha-cha | Viennese Waltz | Contemporary | Paso Doble | Slowfox | Rumba | Tango | Freestyle |
| Matouš & Natálie | Samba | Waltz | Quickstep | Rumba | Jive | Tango | Cha-cha-cha | Viennese Waltz | Contemporary | Slowfox | Paso Doble | Jive | Tango | Freestyle |
| Jakub & Michaela | Viennese Waltz | Cha-cha-cha | Samba | Waltz | Quickstep | Jive | Tango | Rumba | Contemporary | Paso Doble | Slowfox | Cha-cha-cha | Slowfox | Freestyle |
| Karel & Veronika L. | Viennese Waltz | Cha-cha-cha | Samba | Waltz | Quickstep | Jive | Tango | Rumba | Contemporary | Slowfox | Paso Doble | | | |
| Gabriela & Martin | Viennese Waltz | Cha-cha-cha | Samba | Waltz | Quickstep | Jive | Tango | Rumba | Contemporary | | | | | |
| Miroslav & Adriana | Jive | Tango | Paso Doble | Samba | Waltz | Cha-cha-cha | | | | | | | | |
| Radka & Tomáš | Samba | Waltz | Quickstep | Rumba | Jive | | | | | | | | | |
| Ondřej & Markéta | Jive | Tango | Paso Doble | Samba | | | | | | | | | | |
| Tonya & Michal | Jive | Tango | Paso Doble | | | | | | | | | | | |
| Nora & Jan | Jive | Tango | | | | | | | | | | | | |

Highest scoring dance
Lowest scoring dance
