= StarDance (Czech TV series) season 7 =

StarDance
- Season 7
- Celebrity winner: Marie Doležalová
- Professional winner: Marek Zelinka

Release
- Original network: Česká televize
- Original release: October 17 – December 19, 2015

Season chronology
- ← Previous; Season 6 Next → Season 8

The seventh season of StarDance (Czech Republic) debuted on Česká televize on October 17, 2015. Ten celebrities were paired with ten professional ballroom dancers. Marek Eben and Tereza Kostková were the hosts for this season.

== Couples ==
The ten professionals and celebrities that competed were:

Celebrity	Occupation / Known for	Professional partner	Status	Ref.
Lucie Dvořáková	DJ	Michal Kurtiš	Eliminated 1st on October 24, 2015	
Rostislav Osička	Boxer	Romana Motlová	Eliminated 2nd on October 31, 2015	
Kateřina Cajthamlová	Psychotherapist	Petr Čadek	Eliminated 3rd on November 7, 2015	
Marek Taclík	Actor	Martina Marková	Eliminated 4th on November 14, 2015	
Leona Machálková	Singer	Michal Necpál	Eliminated 5th on November 21, 2015	
Leoš Mareš	TV host	Katarína Štumpfová	Eliminated 6th on December 5, 2015	
Radek Banga	Singer, songwriter	Tereza Bufková	Eliminated 7th on December 12, 2015	
Lukáš Pavlásek	Actor, comedian	Lucie Hunčárová	Third place on December 19, 2015	
Jitka Schneiderová	Actress	Marek Dědík	Runner-up on December 19, 2015	
Marie Doležalová	Actress	Marek Zelinka	Winner on December 19, 2015	

== Scoring Chart ==
Couples	Place	1	2	3	4	5	6	7	8	9	10
Marie & Marek Z.	1	25	29	26	30	27	33+1=34	40	32+38=70	36+40=76	37+40+40=117
Jitka & Marek D.	2	31	30	39	32	30	40+1=41	38	34+40=74	36+37=73	39+38+40=117
Lukáš & Lucie H.	3	16	13	20	15	14	13+1=14	33	11+15=26	21+19=40	20+23+21=64
Radek & Tereza	4	30	27	32	24	30	23+0=23	40	30+35=65	35+36=71	
Leoš & Katarína	5	31	27	33	33	25	34+0=34	35	34+29=63		
Leona & Michal N.	6	29	31	34	21	36	27+0=27				
Marek T. & Martina	7	19	24	27	20	23					
Kateřina & Petr	8	25	22	28	19						
Rostislav & Romana	9	15	14	12							
Lucie D. & Michal K.	10	17	22								

Red numbers indicate the lowest score for each week.
Green numbers indicate the highest score for each week.
indicates the couple eliminated that week.
indicates the winning couple.
indicates the runner-up couple.
indicates the third place couple.

== Dance chart ==
The celebrities and dance partners danced one of these routines for each corresponding week:

Couple	Week 1	Week 2	Week 3	Week 4	Week 5	Week 6	Week 7	Week 8		Week 9		Week 10		
Marie & Marek Z.	Samba	Slowfox	Jive	Quickstep	Salsa	Cha-cha-cha	Tango	Waltz	Paso Doble	Rumba	Viennese Waltz	Samba	Viennese Waltz	Freestyle
Jitka & Marek D.	Samba	Slowfox	Jive	Quickstep	Salsa	Cha-cha-cha	Tango	Waltz	Paso Doble	Viennese Waltz	Rumba	Jive	Waltz	Freestyle
Lukáš & Lucie H.	Tango	Paso Doble	Waltz	Cha-cha-cha	Viennese Waltz	Rumba	Jive	Samba	Slowfox	Quickstep	Salsa	Samba	Quickstep	Freestyle
Radek & Tereza	Tango	Paso Doble	Waltz	Cha-cha-cha	Viennese Waltz	Rumba	Jive	Slowfox	Samba	Salsa	Quickstep			
Leoš & Katarína	Samba	Slowfox	Jive	Quickstep	Salsa	Cha-cha-cha	Tango	Paso Doble	Waltz					
Leona & Michal N.	Tango	Paso Doble	Waltz	Cha-cha-cha	Viennese Waltz	Rumba								
Marek T. & Martina	Samba	Slowfox	Jive	Quickstep	Salsa									
Kateřina & Petr	Tango	Paso Doble	Waltz	Cha-cha-cha										
Rostislav & Romana	Tango	Paso Doble	Waltz											
Lucie D. & Michal K.	Samba	Slowfox												

Highest scoring dance
Lowest scoring dance
