= StarDance (Czech TV series) season 12 =

StarDance
- Season 12
- Celebrity winner: Darija Pavlovičová
- Professional winner: Dominik Vodička
- No. of episodes: 10

Release
- Original network: Czech Television
- Original release: October 14 – December 16, 2023

Season chronology
- ← Previous; Season 11 Next → Season 13

The 12th StarDance series dancing reality TV show was premiered on October 14, 2023, and ended on December 16, 2023. Hosts in this series are again Marek Eben and Tereza Kostková. It is the first Czech season in which a married couple of celebrities compete (snowboarder Eva Adamczyková and actor Marek Adamczyk).

== Couples ==
The ten professionals and celebrities that competed were:

Celebrity	Occupation / Known for	Professional partner	Status	Ref.
David Prachař	Actor	Zuzana Dvořáková Šťastná	Eliminated 1st on October 21, 2023	
Ivana Chýlková	Actress	Jan Tománek	Eliminated 2nd on October 29, 2023	
Richard Krajčo	Singer	Dominika Rošková	Eliminated 3rd on November 4, 2023	
Tereza Mašková	Singer	Daniel Kecskeméti	Eliminated 4th on November 11, 2023	
Marek Adamczyk	Actor	Lenka Nora Návorková	Eliminated 5th on November 18, 2023	
Josef Maršálek	Confectioner	Adriana Mašková	Eliminated 6th on December 2, 2023	
Iva Kubelková	Host, model	Martin Prágr	Eliminated 7th on December 9, 2023	
Vavřinec Hradilek	Slalom canoeist	Kateřina Bartuněk Hrstková	Third place on December 16, 2023	
Eva Adamczyková	Snowboarder	Jakub Mazůch	Runner-up on December 16, 2023	
Darija Pavlovičová	Actress	Dominik Vodička	Winner on December 16, 2023	

== Scoring Chart ==
Couples	Place	1	2	3	4	5	6	7	8	9	10
Darija & Dominik	1	15	23	19	25	26	28+2=30	28	28+29=57	27+27=54	29+30+29=88
Eva & Jakub	2	22	24	29	27	27	26+2=28	30	27+30=57	26+29=55	30+30+29=89
Vavřinec & Kateřina	3	21	15	23	23	24	15+0=15	19	23+27=50	26+24=50	27+29+30=86
Iva & Martin	4	20	25	21	22	30	27+0=27	29	25+27=52	27+24=51	
Josef & Adriana	5	12	15	16	19	18	22+2=24	21	20+24=44		
Marek & Lenka	6	17	22	18	23	21	21+0=21				
Tereza & Daniel	7	18	21	22	25	23					
Richard & Dominika	8	22	19	26	22						
Ivana & Jan	9	14	16	15							
David & Zuzana	10	14	16								

Red numbers indicate the lowest score for each week.
Green numbers indicate the highest score for each week.
indicates the couple eliminated that week.
indicates the winning couple.
indicates the runner-up couple.
indicates the third place couple.

== Dance chart ==
The celebrities and dance partners danced one of these routines for each corresponding week:

Couple	Week 1	Week 2	Week 3	Week 4	Week 5	Week 6	Week 7	Week 8		Week 9		Week 10		
Darija & Dominik	Cha-cha-cha	Tango	Jive	Quickstep	Samba	Waltz	Rumba	Slowfox	Contemporary	Viennese Waltz	Paso Doble	Samba	Waltz	Freestyle
Eva & Jakub	Jive	Viennese Waltz	Rumba	Slowfox	Cha-cha-cha	Tango	Paso Doble	Quickstep	Contemporary	Samba	Waltz	Rumba	Viennese Waltz	Freestyle
Vavřinec & Kateřina	Waltz	Samba	Quickstep	Paso Doble	Viennese Waltz	Jive	Slowfox	Cha-cha-cha	Contemporary	Tango	Rumba	Paso Doble	Tango	Freestyle
Iva & Martin	Cha-cha-cha	Tango	Jive	Quickstep	Samba	Waltz	Rumba	Slowfox	Contemporary	Viennese Waltz	Paso Doble			
Josef & Adriana	Jive	Viennese Waltz	Rumba	Slowfox	Cha-cha-cha	Tango	Paso Doble	Quickstep	Contemporary					
Marek & Lenka	Waltz	Samba	Quickstep	Paso Doble	Viennese Waltz	Jive								
Tereza & Daniel	Cha-cha-cha	Tango	Jive	Quickstep	Samba									
Richard & Dominika	Cha-cha-cha	Tango	Jive	Quickstep										
Ivana & Jan	Waltz	Samba	Quickstep											
David & Zuzana	Jive	Viennese Waltz												

Highest scoring dance
Lowest scoring dance
