= Václav Vydra =

Václav Vydra mey refer to:

- Václav Vydra (actor, born 1876) (1876–1953), Czech film and stage actor
- Václav Vydra (actor, born 1956), Czech theater, television and film actor
