= StarDance (Czech TV series) season 3 =

StarDance
- Season 3
- Celebrity winner: Dana Batulková
- Professional winner: Jan Onder
- No. of episodes: 8

Release
- Original network: Česká televize
- Original release: November 1 – December 20, 2008

Season chronology
- ← Previous; Season 2 Next → Season 4

The third season of StarDance (Czech Republic) debuted on Česká televize on November 1, 2008. Eight celebrities were paired with eight professional ballroom dancers. Marek Eben and Tereza Kostková were the hosts for this season.

== Couples ==
The eight professionals and celebrities that competed were:

Celebrity	Occupation / Known for	Professional partner	Status
Bohouš Josef	Singer	Lenka Tvrzová	Eliminated 1st on November 8, 2008
Iva Frühlingová	Singer	Michal Kostovčík	Eliminated 2nd on November 15, 2008
David Suchařípa	Actor	Albina Zaytseva	Eliminated 3rd on November 22, 2008
Jana Doleželová	Miss Czech Republic 2004	Michal Necpál	Eliminated 4th on November 29, 2008
Vladimír Kratina	Actor	Laura Klimentová	Eliminated 5th on December 6, 2008
Jaromír Bosák	Sports commentator	Eva Krejčířová	Third place on December 13, 2008
Zuzana Norisová	Slovak actress, singer	Jan Kliment	Runner-up on December 20, 2008
Dana Batulková	Actress	Jan Onder	Winner on December 20, 2008

== Scoring Chart ==
Couples	Place	1	2	3	4	5	6	7	8
Dana & Jan O.	1	26	25	34	30	30	33+30=63	30+38=68	36+40+40=116
Zuzana & Jan K.	2	26	31	32	35	35	39+40=79	36+38=74	40+39+40=119
Jaromír & Eva	3	12	15	22	25	19	32+21=53	30+27=57	
Vladimír & Laura	4	23	19	27	28	28	26+27=53		
Jana & Michal N.	5	24	24	29	28	23			
David & Albina	6	19	21	22	19				
Iva & Michal K.	7	17	16	19					
Bohouš & Lenka	8	14	19						

Red numbers indicate the lowest score for each week.
Green numbers indicate the highest score for each week.
indicates the couple eliminated that week.
indicates the winning couple.
indicates the runner-up couple.

=== Average score chart ===
This table only counts for dances scored on a 40-point scale.

Rank by average	Place	Couple	Total points	Number of dances	Average
1	2	Zuzana & Jan K.	431	12	35.9
2	1	Dana & Jan O.	392	12	32.7
3	5	Jana & Michal N.	128	5	25.6
4	4	Vladimír & Laura	178	7	25.4
5	3	Jaromír & Eva	203	9	22.3
6	6	David & Albina	81	4	20.3
7	7	Iva & Michal K.	52	3	17.3
8	8	Bohouš & Lenka	33	2	16.5

=== Highest and lowest scoring performances ===
The best and worst performances in each dance according to the judges' 40-point scale are as follows:

Dance	Highest Scored dancer(s)	Highest score	Lowest Scored dancer(s)	Lowest score
Cha-cha-cha	Dana Batulková	30	Iva Frühlingová	17
Waltz	Zuzana Norisová	40	Jaromír Bosák	12
Quickstep	Zuzana Norisová	40	Iva Frühlingová	16
Rumba	Zuzana Norisová	38	Jaromír Bosák	15
Jive	Zuzana Norisová	32	Iva Frühlingová	19
Tango	Zuzana Norisová	36	Jaromír Bosák	22
Slowfox	Zuzana Norisová	35	David Suchařípa	19
Paso Doble	Dana Batulková	40	Jaromír Bosák	25
Samba	Zuzana Norisová	35	Jaromír Bosák	19
Freestyle	Zuzana Norisová; Dana Batulková	40	—	—

=== Couples' highest and lowest scoring dances ===
Scores are based upon a potential 40-point maximum.

Couples	Highest scoring dance(s)	Lowest scoring dance(s)
Dana & Jan O.	Paso Doble & Freestyle (40)	Rumba (25)
Zuzana & Jan K.	Waltz, Quickstep & Freestyle (40)	Cha-cha-cha (26)
Jaromír & Eva	Slowfox (32)	Waltz (12)
Vladimír & Laura	Slowfox & Samba (28)	Quickstep (19)
Jana & Michal N.	Tango (29)	Samba (23)
David & Albina	Jive (22)	Cha-cha-cha & Slowfox (19)
Iva & Michal K.	Jive (19)	Quickstep (16)
Bohouš & Lenka	Rumba (19)	Waltz (14)

== Dance chart ==
The celebrities and dance partners danced one of these routines for each corresponding week:

- Week 1: Cha-cha-cha or waltz
- Week 2: Rumba or quickstep
- Week 3: Jive or tango
- Week 4: Paso Doble or Slowfox
- Week 5: Samba
- Week 6: One unlearned dance
- Week 7: One unlearned dance
- Week 8: Couples' choice and freestyle

Couple	Week 1	Week 2	Week 3	Week 4	Week 5	Week 6		Week 7		Week 8		
Dana & Jan O.	Waltz	Rumba	Tango	Paso Doble	Samba	Slowfox	Jive	Cha-cha-cha	Quickstep	Waltz	Paso Doble	Freestyle
Zuzana & Jan K.	Cha-cha-cha	Quickstep	Jive	Slowfox	Samba	Paso Doble	Waltz	Tango	Rumba	Quickstep	Paso Doble	Freestyle
Jaromír & Eva	Waltz	Rumba	Tango	Paso Doble	Samba	Slowfox	Jive	Quickstep	Cha-cha-cha			
Vladimír & Laura	Cha-cha-cha	Quickstep	Jive	Slowfox	Samba	Paso Doble	Waltz					
Jana & Michal N.	Waltz	Rumba	Tango	Paso Doble	Samba							
David & Albina	Cha-cha-cha	Quickstep	Jive	Slowfox								
Iva & Michal K.	Cha-cha-cha	Quickstep	Jive									
Bohouš & Lenka	Waltz	Rumba										

Highest scoring dance
Lowest scoring dance
