= StarDance (Czech TV series) season 13 =

StarDance
- Season 13
- Celebrity winner: Oskar Hes
- Professional winner: Kateřina Bartuněk Hrstková
- No. of episodes: 10

Release
- Original network: Czech Television
- Original release: 12 October – 14 December 2024

Season chronology
- ← Previous; Season 12 Next → Season 14

The 13th series of StarDance dancing reality TV show, was premiered on October 12, 2024, and ended on December 14, 2024. The hosts in this series are Marek Eben and Tereza Kostková. Jury Zdeněk Chlopčík was replaced by Jan Tománek. Choreographer Marek Zelinka was replaced by Ivana Hannichová and Martin Kolda.

== Couples ==
The ten professionals and celebrities that competed were:

Celebrity	Occupation / Known for	Professional partner	Status	Ref.
Ondřej Ruml	Singer	Andrea Třeštiková	Eliminated 1st on October 19, 2024	
Jiří Ježek	Cyclist	Lenka Nora Návorková	Eliminated 2nd on October 26, 2024	
Ta Thuy Dung	Chef	Jakub Mazůch	Eliminated 3rd on November 2, 2024	
Filip Blažek	Actor	Adriana Mašková	Eliminated 4th on November 9, 2024	
Jana Paulová	Actress	Robin Ondráček	Eliminated 5th on November 16, 2024	
Patrik Hartl	Writer	Tereza Prucková	Withdrew on December 7, 2024	
Martina Ptáčková	Fighter	Dominik Vodička	Eliminated 6th on December 7, 2024	
Lucie Vondráčková	Singer, actress	Lukáš Bartuňek	Third place on December 14, 2024	
Marta Dancingerová	Actress	Martin Prágr	Runner-up on December 14, 2024	
Oskar Hes	Actor	Kateřina Bartuněk Hrstková	Winner on December 14, 2024	

== Scoring Chart ==
Couples	Place	1	2	3	4	5	6	7	8	9	10
Oskar & Kateřina	1	23	25	25	28	28	30+0=30	27	29+30=59	30+29=59	30+29+30=89
Marta & Martin	2	21	23	24	23	27	27+2=29	30	26+30=56	30+26=56	30+28+30=88
Lucie & Lukáš	3	20	24	19	25	23	28+2=30	29	24+30=54	28+24=52	27+28+30=85
Martina & Dominik	4	12	21	17	22	18	24+0=24	19	21+25=46	25+24=49	
Patrik & Tereza	5	18	19	21	19	21	24+2=26	23	22+27=49		
Jana & Robin	6	24	19	21	27	19	20+0=20				
Filip & Adriana	7	18	23	18	27	21					
Ta Thuy & Jakub	8	22	23	21	22						
Jiří & Lenka	9	23	22	20							
Ondřej & Andrea	10	15	21								

Red numbers indicate the lowest score for each week.
Green numbers indicate the highest score for each week.
indicates the couple eliminated that week.
indicates the couple that withdrew from the competition.
indicates the winning couple.
indicates the runner-up couple.
indicates the third place couple.

== Dance chart ==
The celebrities and dance partners danced one of these routines for each corresponding week:

Couple	Week 1	Week 2	Week 3	Week 4	Week 5	Week 6	Week 7	Week 8		Week 9		Week 10		
Oskar & Kateřina	Waltz	Samba	Viennese Waltz	Paso Doble	Quickstep	Jive	Slowfox	Cha-cha-cha	Contemporary	Rumba	Tango	Samba	Waltz	Freestyle
Marta & Martin	Tango	Jive	Rumba	Quickstep	Cha-cha-cha	Viennese Waltz	Paso Doble	Slowfox	Contemporary	Samba	Waltz	Paso Doble	Viennese Waltz	Freestyle
Lucie & Lukáš	Tango	Jive	Rumba	Quickstep	Cha-cha-cha	Viennese Waltz	Paso Doble	Slowfox	Contemporary	Waltz	Samba	Paso Doble	Viennese Waltz	Freestyle
Martina & Dominik	Jive	Viennese Waltz	Cha-cha-cha	Waltz	Rumba	Tango	Samba	Quickstep	Contemporary	Slowfox	Paso Doble			
Patrik & Tereza	Waltz	Samba	Viennese Waltz	Paso Doble	Quickstep	Jive	Slowfox	Cha-cha-cha	Contemporary					
Jana & Robin	Waltz	Samba	Viennese Waltz	Paso Doble	Quickstep	Jive								
Filip & Adriana	Jive	Viennese Waltz	Cha-cha-cha	Waltz	Rumba									
Ta Thuy & Jakub	Jive	Viennese Waltz	Cha-cha-cha	Waltz										
Jiří & Lenka	Tango	Jive	Rumba											
Ondřej & Andrea	Jive	Viennese Waltz												

Highest scoring dance
Lowest scoring dance
