= StarDance (Czech TV series) season 11 =

StarDance
- Season 11
- Celebrity winner: Jan Cina
- Professional winner: Adriana Mašková
- No. of episodes: 10

Release
- Original network: Czech Television
- Original release: October 16 – December 18, 2021

Season chronology
- ← Previous; Season 10 Next → Season 12

The 11th StarDance series was premiered on October 16, 2021, and ended on December 18, 2021. Hosts in this series are again Marek Eben and Tereza Kostková.

== Couples ==
The ten professionals and celebrities that competed were:

Celebrity	Occupation / Known for	Professional partner	Status	Ref.
Pavel Trávníček	Actor	Veronika Lálová	Eliminated 1st on October 23, 2021	
Simona Babčáková	Actress	Martin Prágr	Withdrew on November 6, 2021	
Zdeněk Godla	Actor	Tereza Prucková	Eliminated 2nd on November 6, 2021	
Marika Šoposká	Actress	Robin Ondráček	Eliminated 3rd on November 13, 2021	
Andrea Sestini Hlaváčková	Tennis player	Michal Necpál	Eliminated 4th on November 20, 2021	
Mirai Navrátil	Singer	Lenka Nora Návorková	Withdrew on December 4, 2021	
Tereza Černochová	Singer	Dominik Vodička	Eliminated 5th on December 4, 2021	
Tomáš Verner	Figure skater	Kristýna Coufalová	Third place on December 18, 2021	
Martina Viktorie Kopecká	Pastor	Marek Dědík	Runner-up on December 18, 2021	
Jan Cina	Actor	Adriana Mašková	Winner on December 18, 2021	

== Scoring Chart ==
Couples	Place	1	2	3	4	5	6	7	8	9	10
Jan & Adriana	1	32	26	34	35	22	34+0=34	38	29+40=69	40+35=75	38+40+40=118
Martina & Marek	2	22	28	30	27	23	26+0=26	25	30+39=69	32+34=66	32+33+40=105
Tomáš & Kristýna	3	32	29	32	36	36	35+1=36	39	34+40=74	39+40=79	39+40+34=113
Tereza & Dominik	4	27	30	27	39	32	36+1=37	32	37+34=71		
Mirai & Lenka	5	22	26	—	27	33	31+1=32	28			
Andrea & Michal	6	25	25	32	31	27	33+0=33				
Marika & Robin	7	24	26	25	29	32					
Zdeněk & Tereza	8	16	21	29	22						
Simona & Martin	9	27	22								
Pavel & Veronika	10	19	17								

Red numbers indicate the lowest score for each week.
Green numbers indicate the highest score for each week.
indicates the couple eliminated that week.
indicates the couple that withdrew from the competition.
indicates the winning couple.
indicates the runner-up couple.
indicates the third place couple.

== Dance chart ==
The celebrities and dance partners danced one of these routines for each corresponding week:

Couple	Week 1	Week 2	Week 3	Week 4	Week 5	Week 6	Week 7	Week 8		Week 9		Week 10		
Jan & Adriana	Cha-cha-cha	Slowfox	Waltz	Paso Doble	Viennese Waltz	Samba	Tango	Jive	Contemporary	Rumba	Quickstep	Cha-cha-cha	Tango	Freestyle
Martina & Marek	Viennese Waltz	Jive	Tango	Rumba	Cha-cha-cha	Waltz	Quickstep	Paso Doble	Contemporary	Slowfox	Samba	Jive	Tango	Freestyle
Tomáš & Kristýna	Samba	Quickstep	Cha-cha-cha	Tango	Jive	Slowfox	Rumba	Viennese Waltz	Contemporary	Paso Doble	Waltz	Rumba	Tango	Freestyle
Tereza & Dominik	Samba	Quickstep	Cha-cha-cha	Tango	Jive	Slowfox	Rumba	Viennese Waltz	Contemporary					
Mirai & Lenka	Samba	Quickstep	—	Tango	Jive	Slowfox	Rumba							
Andrea & Michal	Cha-cha-cha	Slowfox	Waltz	Paso Doble	Viennese Waltz	Samba								
Marika & Robin	Samba	Quickstep	Cha-cha-cha	Tango	Jive									
Zdeněk & Tereza	Cha-cha-cha	Slowfox	Waltz	Paso Doble										
Simona & Martin	Viennese Waltz	Jive												
Pavel & Veronika	Viennese Waltz	Jive												

Highest scoring dance
Lowest scoring dance
