= StarDance (Czech TV series) season 5 =

StarDance
- Season 5
- Celebrity winner: Kateřina Baďurová
- Professional winner: Jan Onder
- No. of episodes: 8

Release
- Original network: Česká televize
- Original release: November 3 – December 22, 2012

Season chronology
- ← Previous; Season 4 Next → Season 6

The fifth season of StarDance (Czech Republic) debuted on Česká televize on November 3, 2012. Eight celebrities were paired with eight professional ballroom dancers. Marek Eben and Tereza Kostková were the hosts for this season.

== Couples ==
The eight professionals and celebrities that competed were:

Celebrity	Occupation / Known for	Professional partner	Status
Pavlína Němcová	Model	Jan Tománek	Eliminated 1st on November 10, 2012
Petr Bende	Singer	Lucia Krnčanová	Eliminated 2nd on November 17, 2012
Oldřich Navrátil	Actor	Kamila Tománková	Eliminated 3rd on November 24, 2012
Dana Morávková	Actress	Jiří Hein	Eliminated 4th on December 1, 2012
Barbora Poláková	Actress, singer	Václav Masaryk	Eliminated 5th on December 8, 2012
David Švehlík	Actor	Simona Švrčková	Third place on December 15, 2012
Martin Procházka	Ice Hockey Player	Tereza Bufková	Runner-up on December 22, 2012
Kateřina Baďurová	Pole vaulter	Jan Onder	Winner on December 22, 2012

== Scoring Chart ==
Couples	Place	1	2	3	4	5	6	7	8
Kateřina & Jan O.	1	24	25	27	30	35	34+39=73	36+35=71	37+40+40=117
Martin & Tereza	2	27	20	29	26	25	26+33=59	35+32=67	39+37+40=116
David & Simona	3	23	18	25	21	26	28+39=67	28+36=64	
Barbora & Václav	4	26	23	29	29	32	30+36=66		
Dana & Jiří	5	24	25	24	27	30			
Oldřich & Kamila	6	21	21	26	23				
Petr & Lucia	7	20	25	25					
Pavlína & Jan T.	8	24	22						

Red numbers indicate the lowest score for each week.
Green numbers indicate the highest score for each week.
indicates the couple eliminated that week.
indicates the winning couple.
indicates the runner-up couple.

=== Average score chart ===
This table only counts for dances scored on a 40-point scale.

Rank by average	Place	Couple	Total points	Number of dances	Average
1	1	Kateřina & Jan O.	402	12	33.5
2	2	Martin & Tereza	369	12	30.8
3	4	Barbora & Václav	205	7	29.3
4	3	David & Simona	244	9	27.1
5	5	Dana & Jiří	130	5	26.0
6	7	Petr & Lucia	70	3	23.3
7	8	Pavlína & Jan T.	46	2	23.0
8	6	Oldřich & Kamila	91	4	22.3

=== Highest and lowest scoring performances ===
The best and worst performances in each dance according to the judges' 40-point scale are as follows:

Dance	Highest Scored dancer(s)	Highest score	Lowest Scored dancer(s)	Lowest score
Cha-cha-cha	Barbora Poláková	36	Petr Bende	20
Waltz	Martin Procházka	39	Oldřich Navrátil	21
Quickstep	Martin Procházka	33	David Švehlík	18
Rumba	Kateřina Baďurová; David Švehlík	36	Martin Procházka	20
Jive	Martin Procházka	37	Dana Morávková	24
Tango	Kateřina Baďurová	35	Oldřich Navrátil	26
Slowfox	Martin Procházka	35	David Švehlík	21
Paso Doble	Kateřina Baďurová	40	Oldřich Navrátil	23
Samba	Kateřina Baďurová	35	Martin Procházka	25
Freestyle	Kateřina Baďurová; Martin Procházka	40	—	—

=== Couples' highest and lowest scoring dances ===
Scores are based upon a potential 40-point maximum.

Couples	Highest scoring dance(s)	Lowest scoring dance(s)
Kateřina & Jan O.	Paso Doble, Freestyle (40)	Cha-cha-cha (24)
Martin & Tereza	Freestyle (40)	Rumba (20)
David & Simona	Paso Doble (39)	Quickstep (18)
Barbora & Václav	Cha-cha-cha (36)	Rumba (23)
Dana & Jiří	Samba (30)	Cha-cha-cha & Jive (24)
Oldřich & Kamila	Tango (26)	Waltz & Rumba (21)
Petr & Lucie	Quickstep & Jive (25)	Cha-cha-cha (20)
Pavlína & Jan T.	Waltz (24)	Rumba (22)

== Dance chart ==
The celebrities and dance partners danced one of these routines for each corresponding week:

- Week 1: Cha-cha-cha or waltz
- Week 2: Rumba or quickstep
- Week 3: Jive or tango
- Week 4: Paso Doble or Slowfox
- Week 5: Samba
- Week 6: Two unlearned dances
- Week 7: Two unlearned dances
- Week 8: Couples' choice and freestyle

Couple	Week 1	Week 2	Week 3	Week 4	Week 5	Week 6		Week 7		Week 8		
Kateřina & Jan O.	Cha-cha-cha	Quickstep	Jive	Slowfox	Samba	Waltz	Paso Doble	Rumba	Tango	Waltz	Paso Doble	Freestyle
Martin & Tereza	Waltz	Rumba	Tango	Paso Doble	Samba	Cha-cha-cha	Quickstep	Slowfox	Jive	Waltz	Jive	Freestyle
David & Simona	Cha-cha-cha	Quickstep	Jive	Slowfox	Samba	Waltz	Paso Doble	Tango	Rumba			
Barbora & Václav	Waltz	Rumba	Tango	Paso Doble	Samba	Quickstep	Cha-cha-cha					
Dana & Jiří	Cha-cha-cha	Quickstep	Jive	Slowfox	Samba							
Oldřich & Kamila	Waltz	Rumba	Tango	Paso Doble								
Petr & Lucie	Cha-cha-cha	Quickstep	Jive									
Pavlína & Jan T.	Waltz	Rumba										

Highest scoring dance
Lowest scoring dance
