= Šestajovice (Prague-East District) =

- Municipality
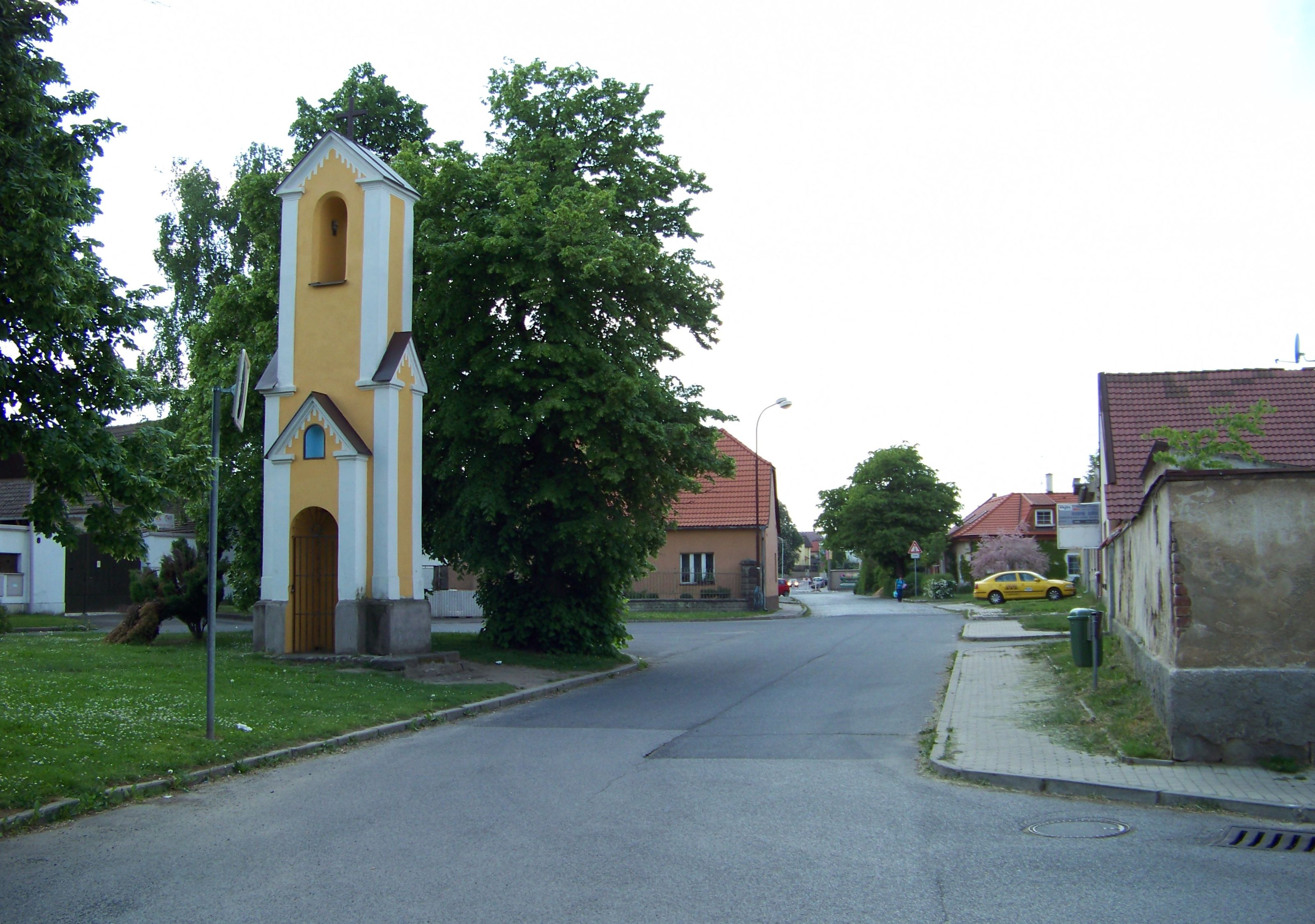
- Belfry

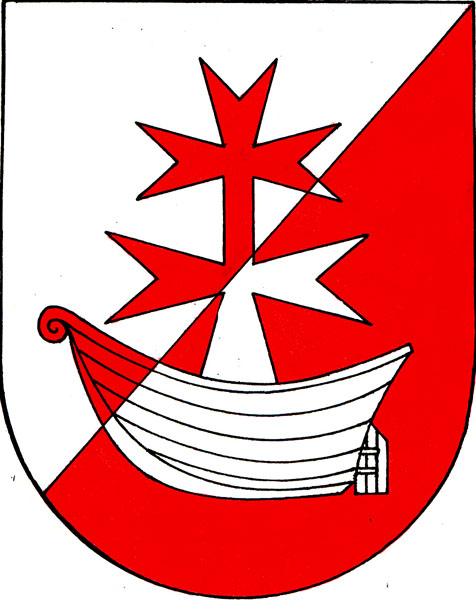
- Flag Coat of arms

- Location in the Czech Republic
- Coordinates: 50°6′27″N 14°40′53″E
- Country: Czech Republic
- Region: Central Bohemian
- District: Prague-East
- First mentioned: 1227

Area
  - Total: 5.42 km^{2} (2.09 sq mi)
- Elevation: 254 m (833 ft)

Population (2026-01-01)
  - Total: 4,220
  - Density: 779/km^{2} (2,020/sq mi)
- Time zone: UTC+1 (CET)
  - Summer (DST): UTC+2 (CEST)
- Postal code: 250 92
- Website: www.sestajovice.cz

Šestajovice (Czech pronunciation: [ˈʃɛstajovɪtsɛ]) is a municipality and village in Prague-East District in the Central Bohemian Region of the Czech Republic. It has about 4,200 inhabitants.

== Etymology ==
The initial name of the settlement was Sestojovice. The name was derived from the personal name Sestoj.

== Geography ==
Šestajovice is located east of Prague, in its immediate vicinity. It is urbanistically fused with Prague-Klánovice. It lies in a flat landscape in the Central Elbe Table.

== History ==
The first written mention of Šestajovice is from 1227. From 1227 until the Hussite Wars, the village was property of the Knights of the Cross with the Red Star from the Zderaz Monastery in Prague; then the owners often changed.

== Demographics ==
Historical population

Year	Pop.	±%
1869	759	—
1880	821	+8.2%
1890	853	+3.9%
1900	819	−4.0%
1910	857	+4.6%

Year	Pop.	±%
1921	820	−4.3%
1930	1,096	+33.7%
1950	1,187	+8.3%
1961	1,195	+0.7%
1970	1,137	−4.9%

Year	Pop.	±%
1980	1,124	−1.1%
1991	1,013	−9.9%
2001	1,280	+26.4%
2011	3,377	+163.8%
2021	4,401	+30.3%

Source: Censuses

== Transport ==
The D11 motorway from Prague to Hradec Králové runs through the municipality.

== Sights ==
The only protected cultural monument in the municipality is a sandstone cross, which dates from 1779. The second historical landmark in the centre of the village is a belfry.

== Notable people ==
- Jaromír Bosák (born 1965), sports commentator and journalist; lives here
