= StarDance (Czech TV series) season 4 =

StarDance
- Season 4
- Celebrity winner: Pavel Kříž
- Professional winner: Alice Stodůlková
- No. of episodes: 8

Release
- Original network: Česká televize
- Original release: October 30 – December 18, 2010

Season chronology
- ← Previous; Season 3 Next → Season 5

The fourth season of StarDance (Czech Republic) debuted on Česká televize on October 30, 2010. Eight celebrities were paired with eight professional ballroom dancers. Marek Eben and Tereza Kostková were the hosts for this season.

== Couples ==
The eight professionals and celebrities that competed were:

| Celebrity | Occupation / Known for | Professional partner | Status |
|---|---|---|---|
| Veronika Žilková | Actress | Marek Dědík | Eliminated 1st on November 6, 2010 |
| Alexander Hemala | TV Presenter | Jitka Šorfová | Eliminated 2nd on November 13, 2010 |
| Filip Sajler | Chef, TV Presenter | Veronika Šmiková | Eliminated 3rd on November 20, 2010 |
| Jitka Čvančarová | Actress | Lukáš Hojdan | Eliminated 4th on November 27, 2010 |
| Saša Rašilov | Actor | Karolína Majerníková | Eliminated 5th on December 4, 2010 |
| Monika Absolonová | Actress, singer | Václav Masaryk | Third place on December 11, 2010 |
| Aneta Langerová | Singer | Michal Kurtiš | Runner-up on December 18, 2010 |
| Pavel Kříž | Actor | Alice Stodůlková | Winner on December 18, 2010 |

== Scoring Chart ==
| Couples | Place | 1 | 2 | 1+2 | 3 | 4 | 5 | 6 | 7 | 8 |
|---|---|---|---|---|---|---|---|---|---|---|
| Pavel & Alice | 1 | 25 | 24 | 49 | 30 | 22 | 35 | 29+30=59 | 33+34=67 | 39+40+39=118 |
| Aneta & Michal | 2 | 22 | 23 | 45 | 34 | 25 | 28 | 28+35=63 | 34+34=68 | 40+36+38=114 |
| Monika & Václav | 3 | 26 | 30 | 56 | 32 | 32 | 35 | 32+38=70 | 40+33=73 | |
| Saša & Karolína | 4 | 21 | 23 | 44 | 26 | 27 | 23 | 30+37=67 | | |
| Jitka Č. & Lukáš | 5 | 22 | 18 | 40 | 30 | 31 | 32 | | | |
| Filip & Veronika Š. | 6 | 16 | 12 | 28 | 17 | 21 | | | | |
| Alexander & Jitka Š. | 7 | 19 | 17 | 38 | 21 | | | | | |
| Veronika Ž. & Marek | 8 | 20 | 18 | 38 | | | | | | |

Red numbers indicate the lowest score for each week.
Green numbers indicate the highest score for each week.
indicates the couple eliminated that week.
indicates the winning couple.
indicates the runner-up couple.

=== Average score chart ===
This table only counts for dances scored on a 40-point scale.

| Rank by average | Place | Couple | Total points | Number of dances | Average |
|---|---|---|---|---|---|
| 1 | 3 | Monika & Václav | 298 | 9 | 33.1 |
| 2 | 1 | Pavel & Alice | 380 | 12 | 31.7 |
| 3 | 2 | Aneta & Michal | 377 | 12 | 31.4 |
| 4 | 4 | Saša & Karolína | 187 | 7 | 26.7 |
| 5 | 5 | Jitka Č. & Lukáš | 133 | 5 | 26.6 |
| 6 | 7 | Alexander & Jitka Š. | 57 | 3 | 19.0 |
| 7 | 8 | Veronika Ž. & Marek | 38 | 2 | 19.0 |
| 8 | 6 | Filip & Veronika Š. | 66 | 4 | 16.5 |

=== Highest and lowest scoring performances ===
The best and worst performances in each dance according to the judges' 40-point scale are as follows:

| Dance | Highest Scored dancer(s) | Highest score | Lowest Scored dancer(s) | Lowest score |
|---|---|---|---|---|
| Cha-cha-cha | Aneta Langerová | 34 | Veronika Žilková | 20 |
| Waltz | Aneta Langerová | 40 | Filip Sajler | 16 |
| Quickstep | Monika Absolonová | 40 | Veronika Žilková; Jitka Čvančarová | 18 |
| Rumba | Pavel Kříž | 33 | Filip Sajler | 12 |
| Jive | Monika Absolonová | 38 | Saša Rašilov | 26 |
| Tango | Pavel Kříž | 39 | Filip Sajler | 17 |
| Slowfox | Monika Absolonová | 32 | Pavel Kříž | 22 |
| Paso Doble | Saša Rašilov | 37 | Filip Sajler | 21 |
| Samba | Pavel Kříž | 40 | Saša Rašilov | 23 |
| Freestyle | Pavel Kříž | 39 | Aneta Langerová | 38 |

=== Couples' highest and lowest scoring dances ===
Scores are based upon a potential 40-point maximum.

| Couples | Highest scoring dance(s) | Lowest scoring dance(s) |
|---|---|---|
| Pavel & Alice | Samba (40) | Slowfox (22) |
| Aneta & Michal | Waltz (40) | Waltz (22) |
| Monika & Václav | Quickstep (40) | Waltz (26) |
| Saša & Karolína | Paso Doble (37) | Cha-cha-cha (21) |
| Jitka Č. & Lukáš | Samba (32) | Quickstep (18) |
| Filip & Veronika Š. | Paso Doble (21) | Rumba (12) |
| Alexander & Jitka Š. | Tango (21) | Rumba (17) |
| Veronika Ž. & Marek | Cha-cha-cha (20) | Quickstep (18) |

== Dance chart ==
The celebrities and dance partners danced one of these routines for each corresponding week:

- Week 1: Cha-cha-cha or waltz
- Week 2: Rumba or quickstep
- Week 3: Jive or tango
- Week 4: Paso Doble or Slowfox
- Week 5: Samba
- Week 6: One unlearned dance
- Week 7: One unlearned dance
- Week 8: Couples' choice and freestyle

| Couple | Week 1 | Week 2 | Week 3 | Week 4 | Week 5 | Week 6 | | Week 7 | | Week 8 | | |
|---|---|---|---|---|---|---|---|---|---|---|---|---|
| Pavel & Alice | Cha-cha-cha | Quickstep | Jive | Slowfox | Samba | Waltz | Paso Doble | Rumba | Tango | Tango | Samba | Freestyle |
| Aneta & Michal | Waltz | Rumba | Tango | Paso Doble | Samba | Slowfox | Jive | Quickstep | Cha-cha-cha | Waltz | Jive | Freestyle |
| Monika & Václav | Waltz | Rumba | Tango | Paso Doble | Samba | Slowfox | Jive | Quickstep | Cha-cha-cha | | | |
| Saša & Karolína | Cha-cha-cha | Quickstep | Jive | Slowfox | Samba | Waltz | Paso Doble | | | | | |
| Jitka Č. & Lukáš | Cha-cha-cha | Quickstep | Jive | Slowfox | Samba | | | | | | | |
| Filip & Veronika Š. | Waltz | Rumba | Tango | Paso Doble | | | | | | | | |
| Alexander & Jitka Š. | Waltz | Rumba | Tango | | | | | | | | | |
| Veronika Ž. & Marek | Cha-cha-cha | Quickstep | | | | | | | | | | |

Highest scoring dance
Lowest scoring dance
