= Dvojka na zabití =

- Genre: Action crime comedy
- Directed by: Libor Kodad
- Starring: Jakub Prachař; Sara Sandeva
- Country of origin: Czech Republic
- Original language: Czech
- No. of seasons: 2
- No. of episodes: 16

Production
- Running time: 55–61 minutes

Original release
- Network: Prima televize
- Release: September 4, 2021

Dvojka na zabití is a Czech action crime comedy television series that has been broadcast by Prima televize since 2021. The series presents two very different protagonists, the torn and lazy detective Martin Rykl and his conscientious and ambitious young colleague Karolína Světlá. They initially get into conflicts very often, but over time they begin to get closer.

In August 2023, the second season of the series began filming. Filming concluded in May 2024 and season 2 was set for broadcast on 21 August 2024.

== Plot ==
Detective Martin Rykl is used to be a happy and contented guy until his wife was murdered by an unknown killer. Since then Martin has become depressed torn. He started having problems with alcohol and suicidal tendencies. New reinforcement is coming to the police department - ambitious and organized young investigator Karolína who is partnered with Rykl.

== Cast ==
- Jakub Prachař as kpt. Martin Rykl
- Sara Sandeva as kpt. Karolína Světlá
- Miroslav Vladyka as mjr. Jaromír Koudelka - murder department commander
- Filip Kaňkovský as Petr Koťátko - technician
- Norbert Lichý as investigator kpt. René Krátký
- Milan Šteindler as investigator kpt. Josef Dlouhý
- Petr Vaněk as pathologist MUDr. Pleva
- Erika Stárková as secretary Soňa
- Adéla Petřeková as JUDr. Lucie Ryklová
- Vanda Hybnerová as Anna Sázavská
- Pavel Řezníček as Richard Sázavský
- Viet Anh Doan as Tonda
- Laura Kodadová as Miriam Světlá - Karolína's sister
- Bohumil Klepl as nprap. Martin Světlý - Karolína's father
- Eva Leinweberová as Eva Světlá - Karolína's mother
- Marek Vašut as Janis Tatopulas
- Jan Pavel Filipenský as Drobek, Tatopulas' bodyguard
- Zdeněk Trčálek as policeman prap. Rudolf Žíně
- Jiří Ployhar as mjr. Miroslav Krejčí, URNA commander
- Taťjana Medvecká as psychologist PhDr. Kateřina Janáková
