= Aleš Valenta =

Czech freestyle skier

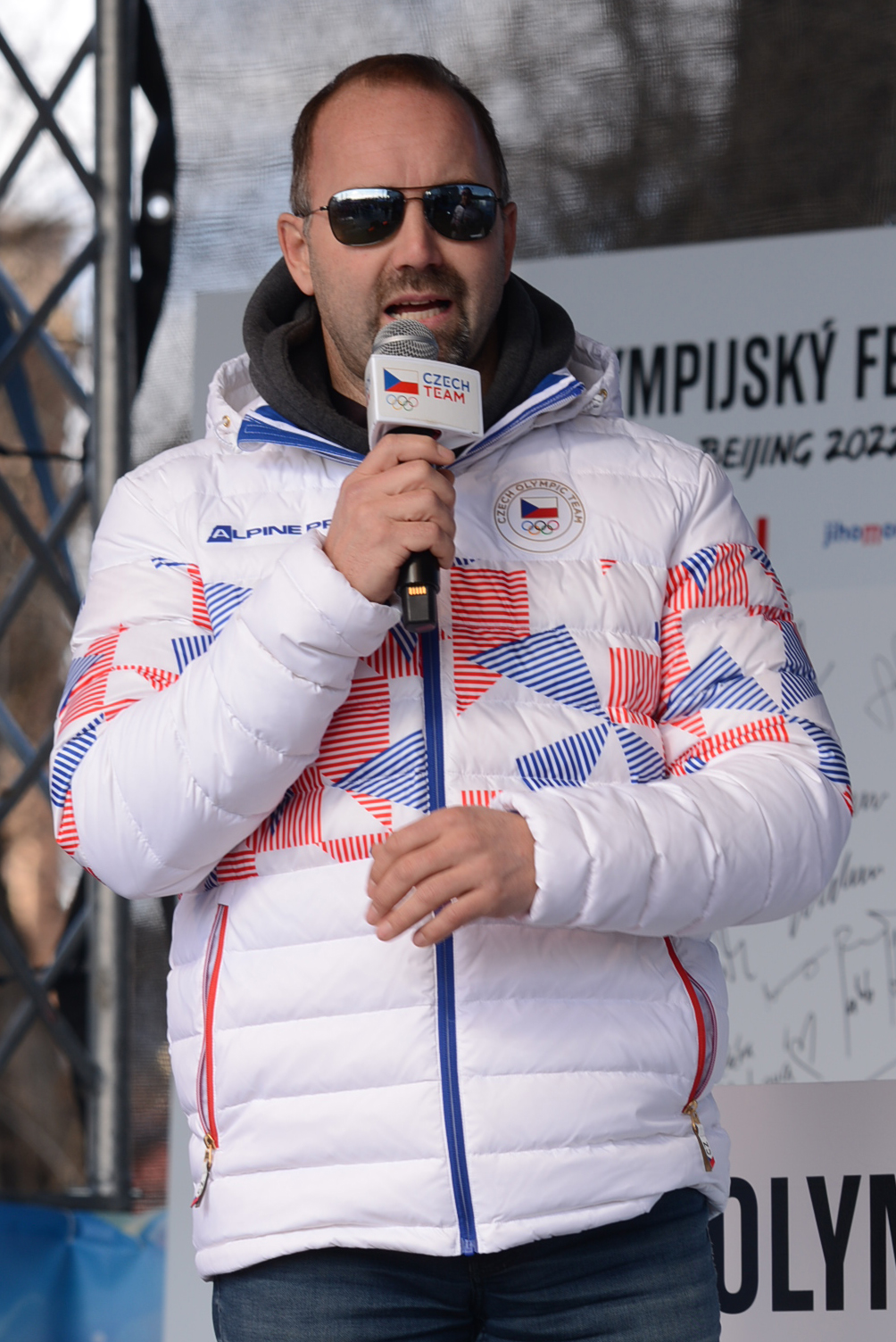
- Aleš Valenta in 2022

Medal record

Men's freestyle skiing

Representing Czech Republic

Olympic Games
Gold medal – first place	2002 Salt Lake City	Aerials

Aleš Valenta (Czech pronunciation: [ˈalɛʃ ˈvalɛnta]) (born 6 February 1973 in Šumperk, Czechoslovakia) is a former Czech freestyle skier who participated in aerials.

On February 19, 2002, he won the Winter Olympics gold medal in the freestyle aerials competition where he succeeded to perform the first triple back flip with five twists in the world. He operates the freestyle skiing centre in the town of Štíty.

In December 2007 Valenta won the second season of StarDance with his professional partner Iva Langerová.

Awards
Preceded by Jan Železný	Czech Athlete of the Year; 2002	Succeeded by Pavel Nedvěd
Olympic Games
Preceded by Luboš Buchta	Flagbearer for the Czech Republic; Salt Lake 2002	Succeeded by Martina Sáblíková
