= Jaromír Bosák =

Czech sports commentator and journalist (born 1965)

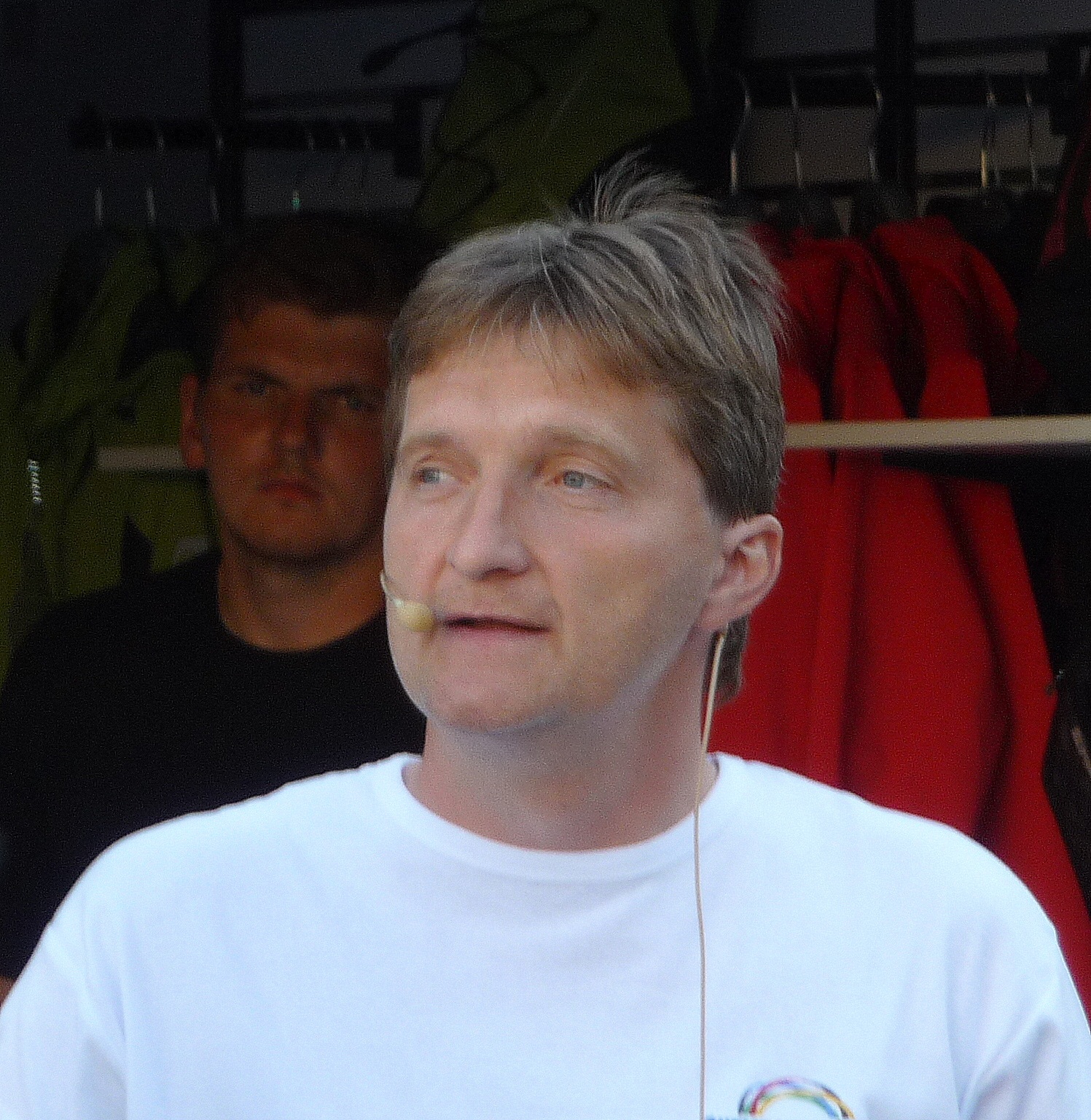
- Bosák in 2011
- Born: 13 May 1965 (age 60); Cheb, Czechoslovakia
- Occupations: Sports commentator, journalist

Jaromír Bosák (born 13 May 1965) is a Czech sports commentator and journalist. He focuses on association football and golf. He has been commentating football for Czech Television since 1994 and has since commented on most of the top football events. He is appreciated for his witty remarks and has a wide fan base.

== Life and education ==
Jaromír Bosák was born in Cheb on 13 May 1965. He has an older sister. He graduated from gymnasium in Cheb, where he also tried acting in an amateur theatre. He studied at Faculty of Arts of Charles University in Prague, but he left school. He then graduated from journalism at the Faculty of Social Sciences of Charles University.

Bosák is married to a Slovak woman, Alena. They have no children. They live in Šestajovice near Prague.

== Career ==
Bosák began his professional career working for Radio Bonton and writing for the Gól magazine, where he focused mainly on the Bundesliga. Since 1994, he has been working for the public Czech Television. The first sport he commented on was water skiing, but he soon focused mainly on commentating of football matches. Later, he added golf to the sports he regularly commented on. In 2000–2002, he was the editor-in-chief of the Sports Department of Czech Television. He became one of the most experienced commentators and also regularly commented on events such as the FIFA World Cup and UEFA European Championship finals, the UEFA Champions League finals, and important Czech Republic national football team matches. He considers the UEFA Euro 2004 match Czech Republic–Netherlands and the 2005 UEFA Champions League final between Liverpool and AC Milan to be the greatest experiences of his commentary career.

Bosák regularly collaborates on the broadcasting of the Olympic Games, which has been the responsibility of Czech Television in the Czech Republic. He is dedicated to moderating the television studio and interviewing Olympians.

Bosák hosts his own talk show Ušák and co-hosts the podcast Nosiči vody. He is the author of several books on sports topics. He is also associated with narrating the commentary for the Czech-language version of the FIFA video game series, which he began in 2008.

Bosák plays football at an amateur level. He has played for several Prague clubs and also for the exhibition team Real Top Prague.

Bosák is not only involved in golf as a sports commentator, but he was the editor-in-chief of two golf magazines and ran a golf school.

In 2008, Bosák participated in the third season of the TV competition StarDance (Czech version of Strictly Come Dancing) and finished in third place.

== Style of work and fan base ==
Bosák is among the most popular Czech sports commentators. In his commentary work, Bosák is known for his quirky style, distinctive humor, insight and exaggeration. He has a wide fan base, and as of May 2025, he had 271k followers on the X platform. His most successful improvised lines, made while commenting on football matches, are collected by his fans and are often mentioned in the media.
