= Dolls (2007 film) =

2007 film

- Pusinky
- Directed by: Karin Babinská
- Starring: Sandra Nováková; Marie Doležalová
- Release date: 2007
- Running time: 90 minutes
- Country: Czech Republic
- Language: Czech

Dolls (Czech: Pusinky) is a 2007 Czech drama film directed by Karin Babinská.

== Synopsis ==
During summer holidays, four teenagers, three girls and a boy, in search of sexual experiences and excesses of all kinds, decide to go to Amsterdam by hitchhiking. Their personalities will be revealed, and the introverted Iska will choose to openly assume the desire she feels for her best friend Karolína.

== Production ==
- Title : Dolls
- Original title : Pusinky
- Director : Karin Babinská
- Scenario : Karin Babinská and Petra Uselova
- Sound : Dolby Digital
- Language : Czech
- Duration : 90 minutes
- Filming location : Czech Republic
- Release date : 5 April 2007
- Country : Czech Republic

== Casting ==
- Sandra Nováková : Karolína
- Marie Doležalová : Iska
- Petra Nesvacilová : Vendula
- Filip Blažek : Marek
- Lenka Vlasáková : Hanka
- Oldřich Hajlich : Vojta
- Erik Kalivoda : Bobr
- Mário Kubas : Vrbar
- Matěj Ruppert : Bedas

== Awards ==
- 2007 Finále Plzeň award
