= StarDance (Czech TV series) season 14 =

StarDance
- Season 14
- Celebrity winner: TBD
- Professional winner: TBD
- No. of episodes: 10

Release
- Original network: Czech Television
- Original release: 10 October – 12 December 2026

Season chronology
- ← Previous; Season 13

The 14th StarDance series is an upcoming dancing reality TV show, scheduled to premiere in October 2026. The hosts in this series are Marek Eben and Tereza Kostková. The judging panel consisted of Tatiana Drexler, Jana Burkiewiczová, Zdeněk Chlopčík and Richard Genzer.

== Couples ==
The ten professionals and celebrities that competed were:

Celebrity	Occupation / Known for	Professional partner	Status	Ref.
Petra Nesvačilová	Actress, director	Filip Hudlický	Withdrew on October 10, 2026	
Radek Štěpánek	Tennis player	Vanda Bartošová Dětinská	Eliminated 1st on October 17, 2026	
Hana Dvorská	Stunt performer	Michal Kurtiš	Eliminated 2nd on October 24, 2026	
Tomáš Polák	Singer	Adriana Mašková	Eliminated 3rd on October 31, 2026	
Tomáš Matonoha	Actor	Lenka Nora Návorková	Eliminated 4th on November 14, 2026	
Vojtěch Dyk	Singer, actor	Catharina Málek	TBD	
Luciana Tomášová	Actress, singer	Robin Ondráček	TBD	
Sara Prachař Sandeva	Actress	Daniel Makovec	TBD	
Tomas Sean Pšenička	Singer, actor	Natálie Otáhalová	TBD	
Marta Jandová	Singer	Martin Prágr	TBD	

== Scoring Chart ==
Couples	Place	1	2	3	4	5	6	7	8	9	10
Marta & Martin		18	27	30	24	32	36+3=39	34			
Sara & Daniel		20	23	19	30	26	30+0=30	29			
Tomas & Natálie		20	31	24	36	36	27+3=30	39			
Luciana & Robin		27	30	33	36	30	38+3=41	32			
Vojtěch & Catharina		30	31	30	32	37	31+0=31	32			
Tomáš M. & Lenka	6	23	21	23	26	22	26+0=26				
Tomáš P. & Adriana	7	11	15	20	21						
Hana & Michal	8	17	24	16							
Radek & Vanda	9	20	25								
Petra & Filip	10	—									

Red numbers indicate the lowest score for each week.
Green numbers indicate the highest score for each week.
indicates the couple eliminated that week.
indicates the couple that withdrew from the competition.
indicates the winning couple.
indicates the runner-up couple.
indicates the third place couple.

== Dance chart ==
The celebrities and dance partners danced one of these routines for each corresponding week:

Couple	Week 1	Week 2	Week 3	Week 4	Week 5	Week 6	Week 7	Week 8	Week 9	Week 10
Marta & Martin	Cha-cha-cha	Tango	Samba	Quickstep	Jive	Rumba	Viennese Waltz	Contemporary		
Sara & Daniel	Waltz	Jive	Viennese Waltz	Paso Doble	Slowfox	Tango	Samba	Contemporary		
Tomas & Natálie	Samba	Quickstep	Jive	Waltz	Rumba	Cha-cha-cha	Slowfox	Contemporary		
Luciana & Robin	Samba	Quickstep	Jive	Waltz	Rumba	Cha-cha-cha	Slowfox	Contemporary		
Vojtěch & Catharina	Samba	Quickstep	Jive	Waltz	Rumba	Cha-cha-cha	Slowfox	Contemporary		
Tomáš M. & Lenka	Waltz	Jive	Viennese Waltz	Paso Doble	Slowfox	Tango				
Tomáš P. & Adriana	Cha-cha-cha	Tango	Samba	Quickstep						
Hana & Michal	Cha-cha-cha	Tango	Samba							
Radek & Vanda	Cha-cha-cha	Tango								
Petra & Filip	—									

Highest scoring dance
Lowest scoring dance
