= StarDance (Czech TV series) season 2 =

StarDance
- Season 2
- Celebrity winner: Aleš Valenta
- Professional winner: Iva Langerová
- No. of episodes: 8

Release
- Original network: Česká televize
- Original release: November 3 – December 22, 2007

Season chronology
- ← Previous; Season 1 Next → Season 3

The second season of StarDance (Czech Republic) debuted on Česká televize on November 3, 2007. Eight celebrities were paired with eight professional ballroom dancers. Marek Eben and Tereza Kostková were the hosts for this season.

== Couples ==
The eight professionals and celebrities that competed were:

| Celebrity | Occupation / Known for | Professional partner | Status |
|---|---|---|---|
| Štěpánka Hilgertová | Slalom canoer | Michal Němeček | Eliminated 1st on November 10, 2007 |
| Lenka Filipová | Singer | Michael Petr | Eliminated 2nd on November 17, 2007 |
| Monika Žídková | Miss Czech Republic 1995 | Jan Halíř | Withdrew on November 20, 2007 |
| Robert Záruba | Sports commentator | Vanda Dětinská | Eliminated 3rd on December 1, 2007 |
| Michal Dlouhý | Actor | Michaela Gatěková | Eliminated 4th on December 8, 2007 |
| Jiří Schmitzer | Actor | Simona Švrčková | Third place on December 15, 2007 |
| Tatiana Vilhelmová | Actress | Petr Čadek | Runner-up on December 22, 2007 |
| Aleš Valenta | Freestyle skier | Iva Langerová | Winner on December 22, 2007 |

== Scoring Chart ==
| Couples | Place | 1 | 2 | 3 | 4 | 5 | 6 | 7 | 8 |
|---|---|---|---|---|---|---|---|---|---|
| Aleš & Iva | 1 | 30 | 35 | 27 | 38 | 32 | 34+32=66 | 38+38=76 | 40+37+39=116 |
| Tatiana & Petr | 2 | 32 | 33 | 28 | 26 | 39 | 34+32=66 | 31+37=68 | 37+40+39=116 |
| Jiří & Simona | 3 | 18 | 23 | 29 | 25 | 19 | 27+29=56 | 26+24=50 | |
| Michal D. & Michaela | 4 | 25 | 30 | 31 | 33 | 33 | 25+37=62 | | |
| Robert & Vanda | 5 | 18 | 28 | 20 | 27 | 27 | | | |
| Monika & Jan | 6 | 22 | 27 | 31 | | | | | |
| Lenka & Michael | 7 | 20 | 21 | 18 | | | | | |
| Štěpánka & Michal N. | 8 | 21 | 22 | | | | | | |

Red numbers indicate the lowest score for each week.
Green numbers indicate the highest score for each week.
indicates the couple eliminated that week.
indicates the couple that withdrew from the competition.
indicates the winning couple.
indicates the runner-up couple.

=== Average score chart ===
This table only counts for dances scored on a 40-point scale.

| Rank by average | Place | Couple | Total points | Number of dances | Average |
|---|---|---|---|---|---|
| 1 | 1 | Aleš & Iva | 420 | 12 | 35.0 |
| 2 | 2 | Tatiana & Petr | 408 | 12 | 34.0 |
| 3 | 4 | Michal D. & Michaela | 214 | 7 | 30.6 |
| 4 | 6 | Monika & Jan | 80 | 3 | 26.7 |
| 5 | 3 | Jiří & Simona | 220 | 9 | 24.4 |
| 6 | 5 | Robert & Vanda | 120 | 5 | 24.0 |
| 7 | 8 | Štěpánka & Michal N. | 43 | 2 | 21.5 |
| 8 | 7 | Lenka & Michael | 59 | 3 | 19.7 |

=== Highest and lowest scoring performances ===
The best and worst performances in each dance according to the judges' 40-point scale are as follows:

| Dance | Highest Scored dancer(s) | Highest score | Lowest Scored dancer(s) | Lowest score |
|---|---|---|---|---|
| Cha-cha-cha | Aleš Valenta | 37 | Jiří Schmitzer | 18 |
| Waltz | Tatiana Vilhelmová | 31 | Robert Záruba | 18 |
| Quickstep | Aleš Valenta | 38 | Štěpánka Hilgertová | 22 |
| Rumba | Michal Dlouhý | 37 | Lenka Filipová | 21 |
| Jive | Michal Dlouhý | 31 | Aleš Valenta | 27 |
| Tango | Tatiana Vilhelmová | 37 | Lenka Filipová | 18 |
| Slowfox | Aleš Valenta | 40 | Jiří Schmitzer | 25 |
| Paso Doble | Aleš Valenta | 38 | Jiří Schmitzer; Robert Záruba | 27 |
| Samba | Tatiana Vilhelmová | 40 | Jiří Schmitzer | 19 |
| Freestyle | Tatiana Vilhelmová; Aleš Valenta | 39 | — | — |

=== Couples' highest and lowest scoring dances ===
Scores are based upon a potential 40-point maximum.

| Couples | Highest scoring dance(s) | Lowest scoring dance(s) |
|---|---|---|
| Aleš & Iva | Slowfox (40) | Jive (27) |
| Tatiana & Petr | Samba (40) | Slowfox (26) |
| Jiří & Simona | Jive & Waltz (29) | Cha-cha-cha (18) |
| Michal D. & Michaela | Rumba (37) | Cha-cha-cha & Waltz (25) |
| Robert & Vanda | Rumba (28) | Waltz (18) |
| Monika & Jan | Tango (31) | Waltz (22) |
| Lenka & Michael | Rumba (21) | Tango (18) |
| Štěpánka & Michal N. | Quickstep (22) | Cha-cha-cha (21) |

== Dance chart ==
The celebrities and dance partners danced one of these routines for each corresponding week:

- Week 1: Cha-cha-cha or waltz
- Week 2: Rumba or quickstep
- Week 3: Jive or tango
- Week 4: Paso Doble or Slowfox
- Week 5: Samba
- Week 6: One unlearned dance
- Week 7: One unlearned dance
- Week 8: Couples' choice and freestyle

| Couple | Week 1 | Week 2 | Week 3 | Week 4 | Week 5 | Week 6 | | Week 7 | | Week 8 | | |
|---|---|---|---|---|---|---|---|---|---|---|---|---|
| Aleš & Iva | Waltz | Rumba | Jive | Slowfox | Samba | Tango | Cha-cha-cha | Paso Doble | Quickstep | Slowfox | Cha-cha-cha | Freestyle |
| Tatiana & Petr | Cha-cha-cha | Quickstep | Jive | Slowfox | Samba | Rumba | Tango | Waltz | Paso Doble | Tango | Samba | Freestyle |
| Jiří & Simona | Cha-cha-cha | Quickstep | Jive | Slowfox | Samba | Paso Doble | Waltz | Rumba | Tango | | | |
| Michal D. & Michaela | Cha-cha-cha | Quickstep | Jive | Paso Doble | Samba | Waltz | Rumba | | | | | |
| Robert & Vanda | Waltz | Rumba | Tango | Paso Doble | Samba | | | | | | | |
| Monika & Jan | Waltz | Rumba | Tango | | | | | | | | | |
| Lenka & Michael | Waltz | Rumba | Tango | | | | | | | | | |
| Štěpánka & Michal N. | Cha-cha-cha | Quickstep | | | | | | | | | | |

Highest scoring dance
Lowest scoring dance
