= Sara Prachař Sandeva =

Czech actress (born 1997)

- Sandeva in 2021
- Born: Sara Sandeva; 25 June 1997 (age 29); Skopje, Macedonia
- Education: Prague Conservatory
- Occupation: Actress
- Years active: c. 2015–present
- Spouse: Jakub Prachař (m. 2026)

Sara Prachař Sandeva (née Sandeva; born 25 June 1997) is a Czech actress.

== Life ==
Sandeva was born in Skopje in Macedonia. When she was a year and a half old, her family moved to the Czech Republic. Her parents run a bistro with Macedonian specialties in Prague. In addition to Czech, she is also fluent in Macedonian.

In September 2023, she obtained Czech citizenship.

In July 2026, Sandeva married Czech actor Jakub Prachař and adopted the double surname Prachař Sandeva.

In 2026, she is participating in the 14th season of Czech dancing reality TV show StarDance with her professional partner Daniel Makovec.

== Selected filmography ==
=== Films ===
- May the Lord Be with Us (2018)
- Po čem muži touží (2018)
- Sea of Hope (2025)
- Dream Team (2026)
- Spring in Prague (2026)

=== TV series ===
- Dvojka na zabití (2021)
- Na vlnách Jadranu (2023)
