= Dana Batulková =

Czech actress and local politician

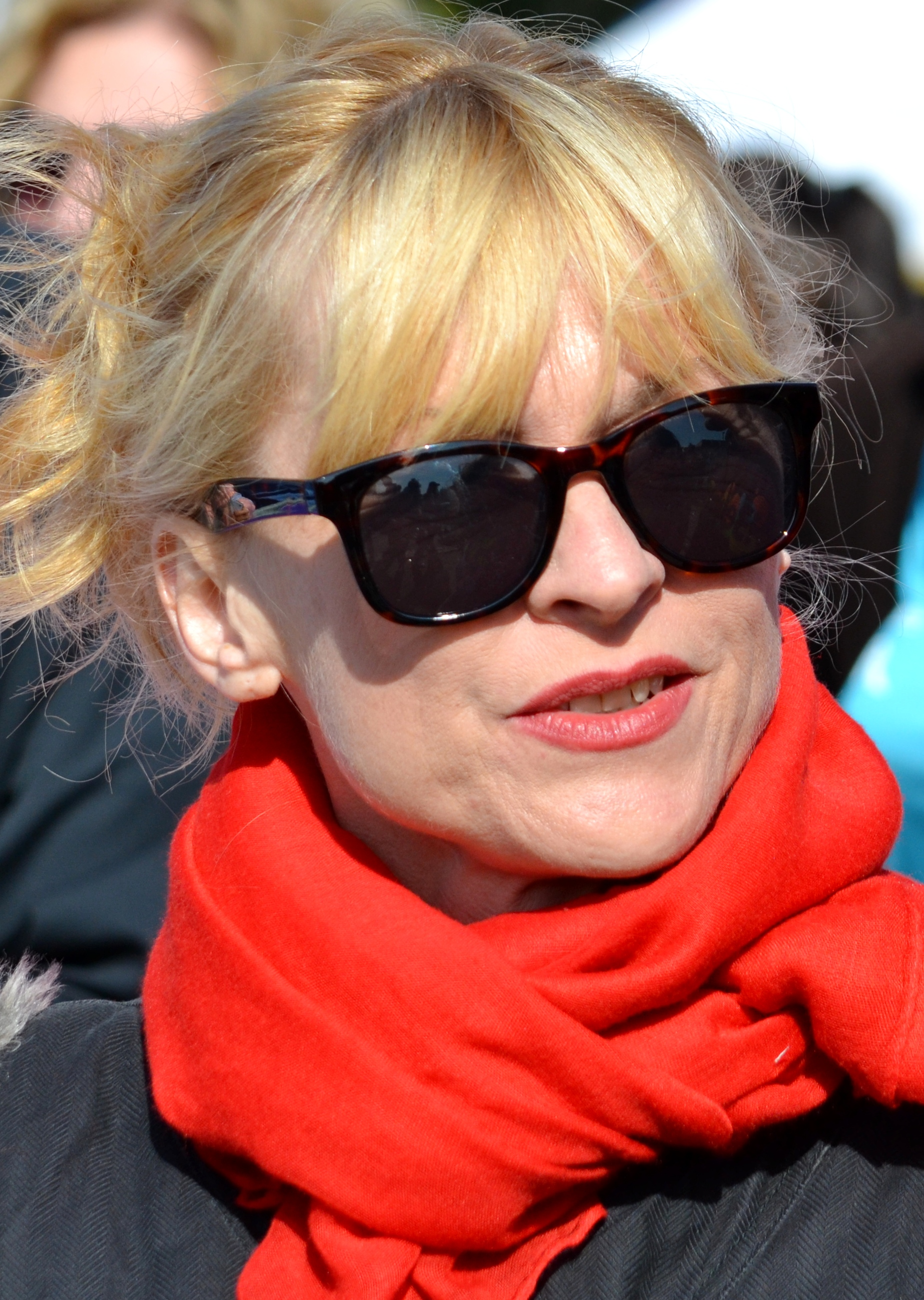
- Dana Batulková (2013)
- Born: Danuše Batulková; 16 March 1958 (age 67); Prague, Czechoslovakia
- Occupation: Actress
- Years active: 1980–present
- Children: 2

Dana Batulková (born 16 March 1958 in Prague) is a Czech actress.

In December 2008 Batulková won the third season of StarDance with her professional partner Jan Onder.

== Selected filmography ==
=== Films ===
- Vrať se do hrobu! (1989)
- Proč pláčeš, břízo bílá (1991) TV
- Trampoty pana Humbla (1997) TV
- Záhadná paní Savageová (1997) TV
- Nezvěstný (2003) TV
- Benátky (2010)

=== TV series ===
- Četnické humoresky (2000, 2007)
- Horákovi (2006 - 2007)
- Comeback (2008 - 2011)
- Gympl s (r)učením omezeným (2013)
- Ohnivý kuře (2016)
