= Monika Absolonová =

Czech singer and actress

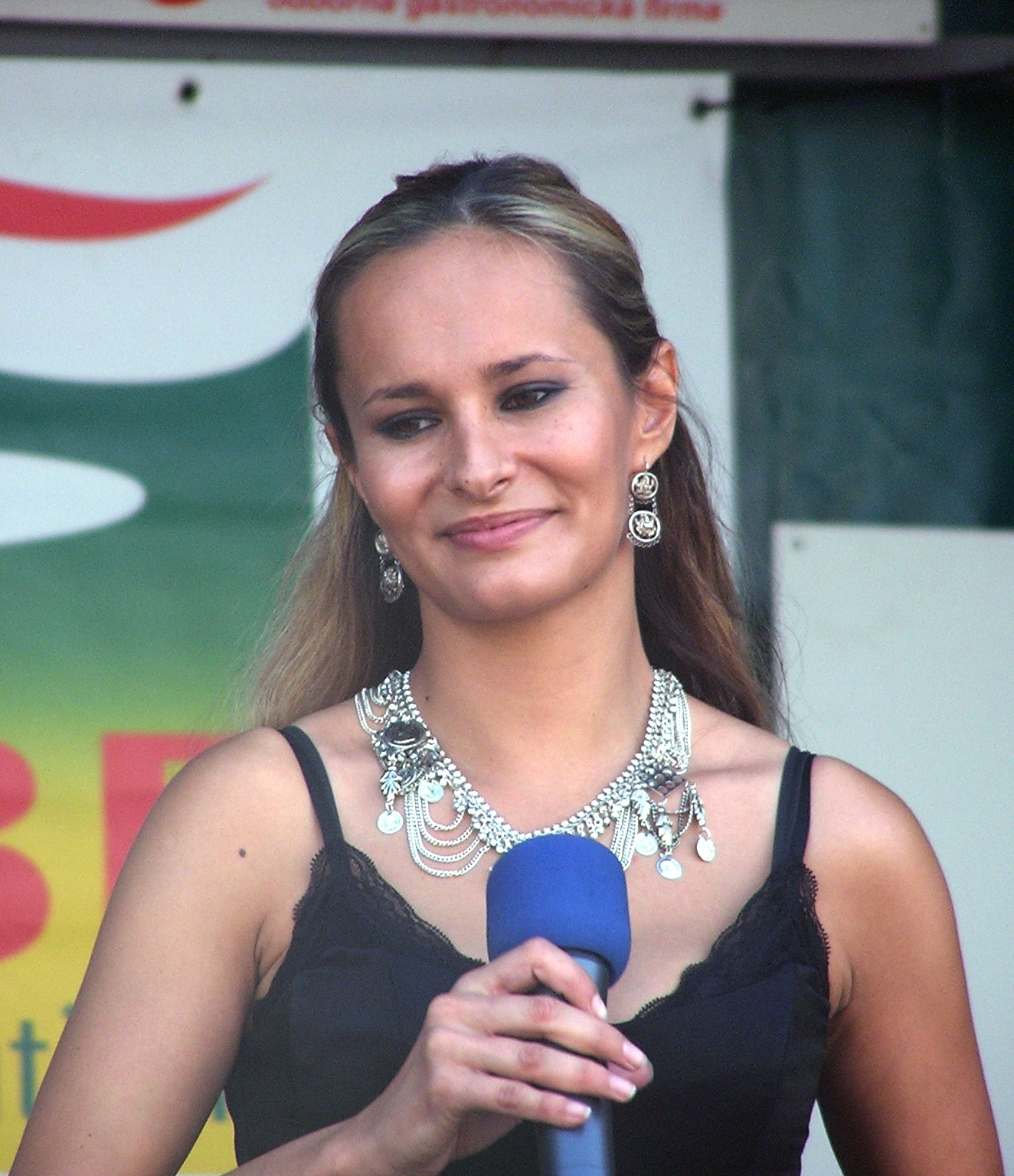
- Monika Absolonová performing in 2004

Background information
- Born: Monika Absolonová; 27 September 1976 (age 49)
- Origin: Benešov, Czechoslovakia
- Occupation: Singer
- Years active: 1993–present
- Labels: Epic; Česká Hudba; Popron Music
- Website: absolonova.cz

Monika Absolonová (born 27 September 1976) is a Czech singer and actress who debuted in 1993 with her first album, Monika. In 2002, she performed the title role in the famous Czech musical, Kleopatra, at Broadway Theatre in Prague. Absolonová performed her first solo concert in Prague's Broadway Theatre in 2010. She took part in the Czech version of Dancing with the Stars in 2010. The same year Absolonová was among the headliners for a concert in Prague's Old Town Square to support the victims of the 2010 Haiti earthquake. She is a two-time winner at the Thalia Awards, having won her second award in 2025 for her portrayal of Judy Garland in the musical play Judy.

== Discography ==
- 1993: Monika
- 1999: První Den
- 2001: Jsem Nevěrná
- 2004: Zůstávám Dál
- 2010: Muzikálové Album
- 2016: Až do nebes
- 2025: Láska
