= Anna K (singer) =

Czech singer (born 1965)

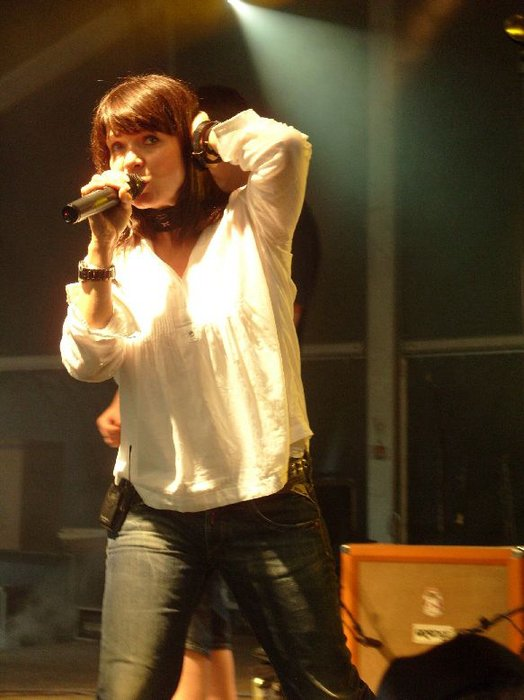
- Anna K in 2008

Background information
- Born: Lucianna Krecarová; 4 January 1965 (age 61)
- Origin: Vrchlabí, Czechoslovakia
- Genres: Pop
- Occupation: Singer
- Years active: 1992–present
- Label: Universal
- Website: anna-k.cz

Lucianna Krecarová (born 4 January 1965), known by the stage name Anna K, is a Czech award-winning singer. She was named female singer of the year at the 1999 and 2006 Anděl Awards. Anna K was diagnosed with breast cancer in 2009. She took part in the 2016 series of the Czech television programme StarDance, dancing with Marek Hrstka.

== Discography ==
=== Studio albums ===
- 1993: Já nezapomínám
- 1995: Amulet
- 1999: Nebe
- 2001: Stačí, když se díváš...
- 2002: Musím tě svést
- 2004: Noc na zemi – limitovaná edice
- 2005: Noc na zemi
- 2006: Večernice
- 2007: Best of 93–07
- 2011: Relativní čas
- 2014: Poprvě Akusticky
- 2017: Světlo
- 2023: Údoli Včel

== Awards and nominations ==
Year	Nominated work	Award	Category	Result	Ref
1999	Herself	Anděl Awards	Female singer of the Year	Won	
2006	Herself	Anděl Awards	Female singer of the Year	Won	
