= Marie Doležalová =

Czech actress

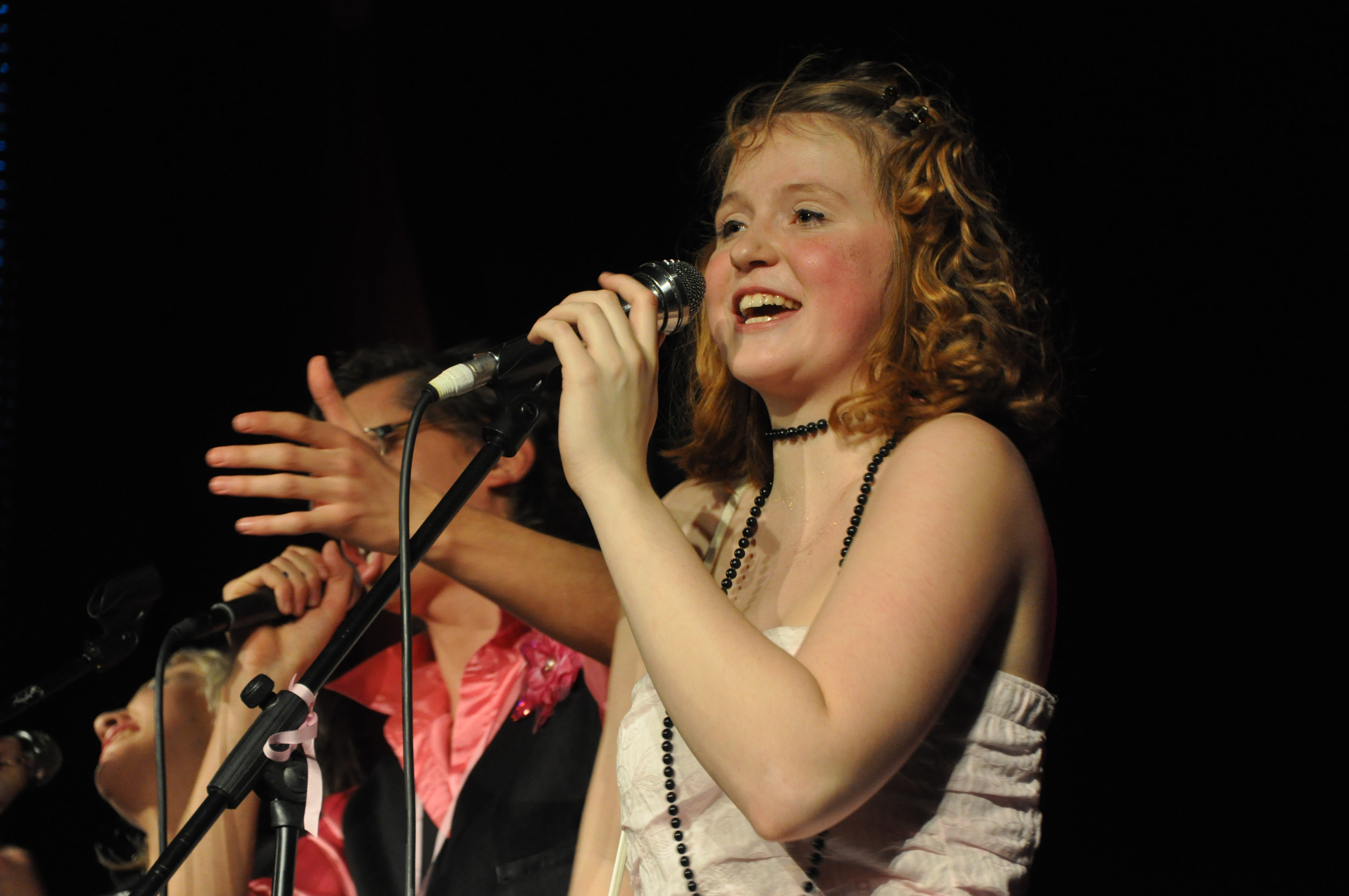
- Doležalová singing with music group Olats otesoc in 2009
- Born: 24 January 1987 (age 38); Karviná, Czechoslovakia
- Occupation: Actress
- Years active: 2006–present
- Partner: Marek Zelinka

Marie Doležalová (born 24 January 1987) is a Czech actress. Doležalová took part in the Czech television series StarDance in 2015, finishing first with dancing partner Marek Zelinka ahead of runners-up Jitka Schneiderová and Marek Dědík.

== Filmography ==
- Comeback (TV series) ... Saša Bůčková
- Dolls (2007) ... Iška
- Lojzička je číslo (2006) ... Lojzička
- Dobrá čtvrť (2005) (TV series) ... student Šárka

== Theatre ==
=== Solidarita Theatre ===
- The Jungle Book ... Snake Ka
- Bílá vrána .... Statue Daphne

=== Conservatory Theatre ===
- Tři v tom .... Colombina
- Yvonne, Princess of Burgundy .... Lady of the Court/Aunt
- Liliomfi .... Camilla, governess

=== Strašnické divadlo ===
- Bílá vrána .... Daphne
- The Jungle Book .... Snake Ka
- Popcorn .... Velvet Delamitri
- Tři v tom .... Colombina

== Other stage works ==
- Krysy .... ??? (Divadlo Na Prádle)
- August: Osage Country .... Jean Fordham (Stavovské divadlo)
