= Jitka Schneiderová =

Czech actress

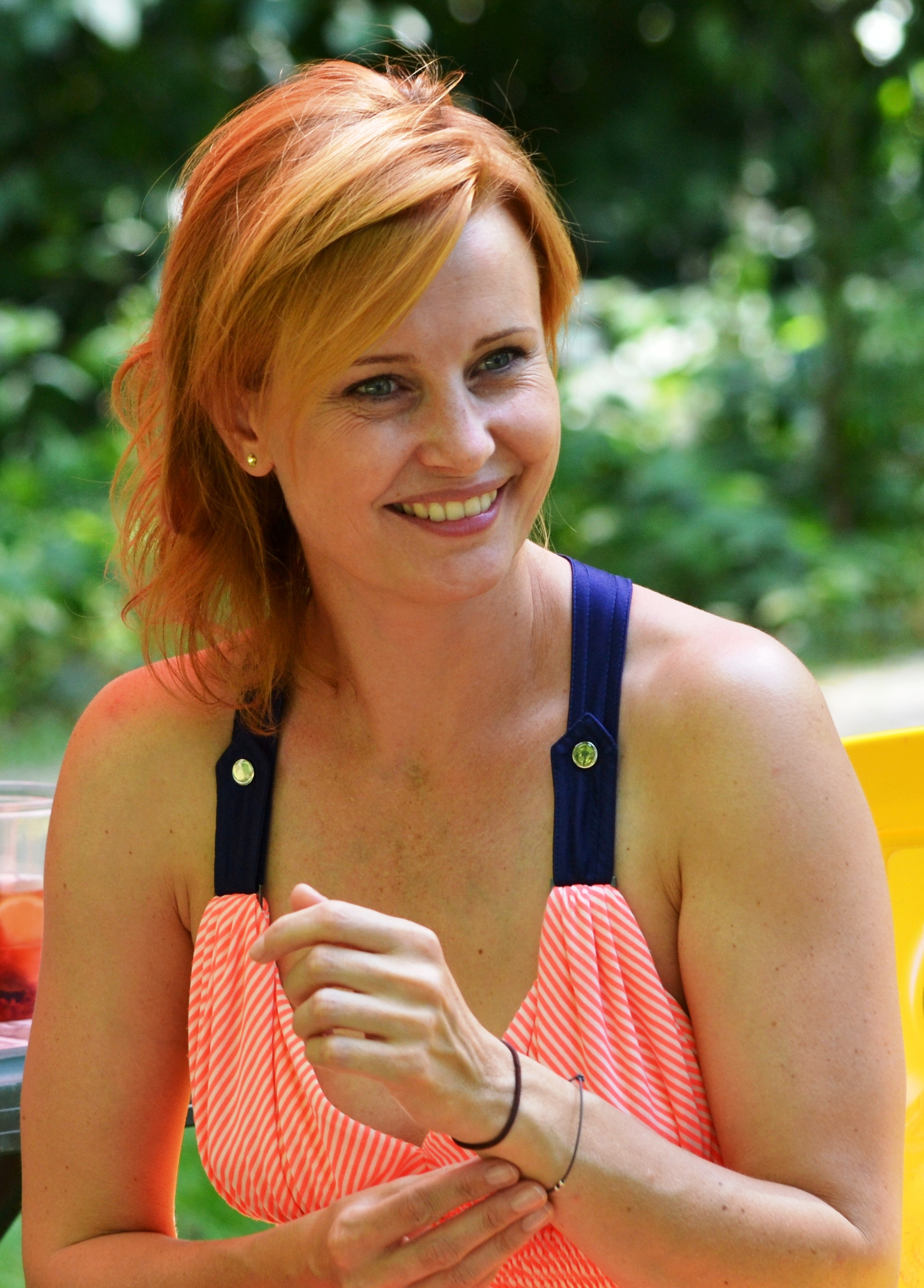
- Schneiderová in 2013
- Born: 23 March 1973 (age 53); Znojmo, Czechoslovakia
- Occupation: Actress
- Years active: 1995-present
- Spouse: David Švehlík (2004–2012)
- Children: 1

Jitka Schneiderová (born 23 March 1973) is a Czech film, television and stage actress. She studied at the Janáček Academy of Music and Performing Arts in Brno. She acted at Studio Ypsilon in Prague between 1996 and 2003. Schneiderová took part in the Czech television series StarDance in 2015, finishing second with dancing partner Marek Dědík behind winners Marie Doležalová and Marek Zelinka.

She has appeared in several Theatre Studio DVA productions.

== Selected filmography ==
- Nováci (1996, television)
- Loners (2000)
- Ďáblova lest (2009)
- Lost in Munich (2015)
- Přístav (2015–2016, television)
- Chica Checa (2026)
