= Iva Frühlingová =

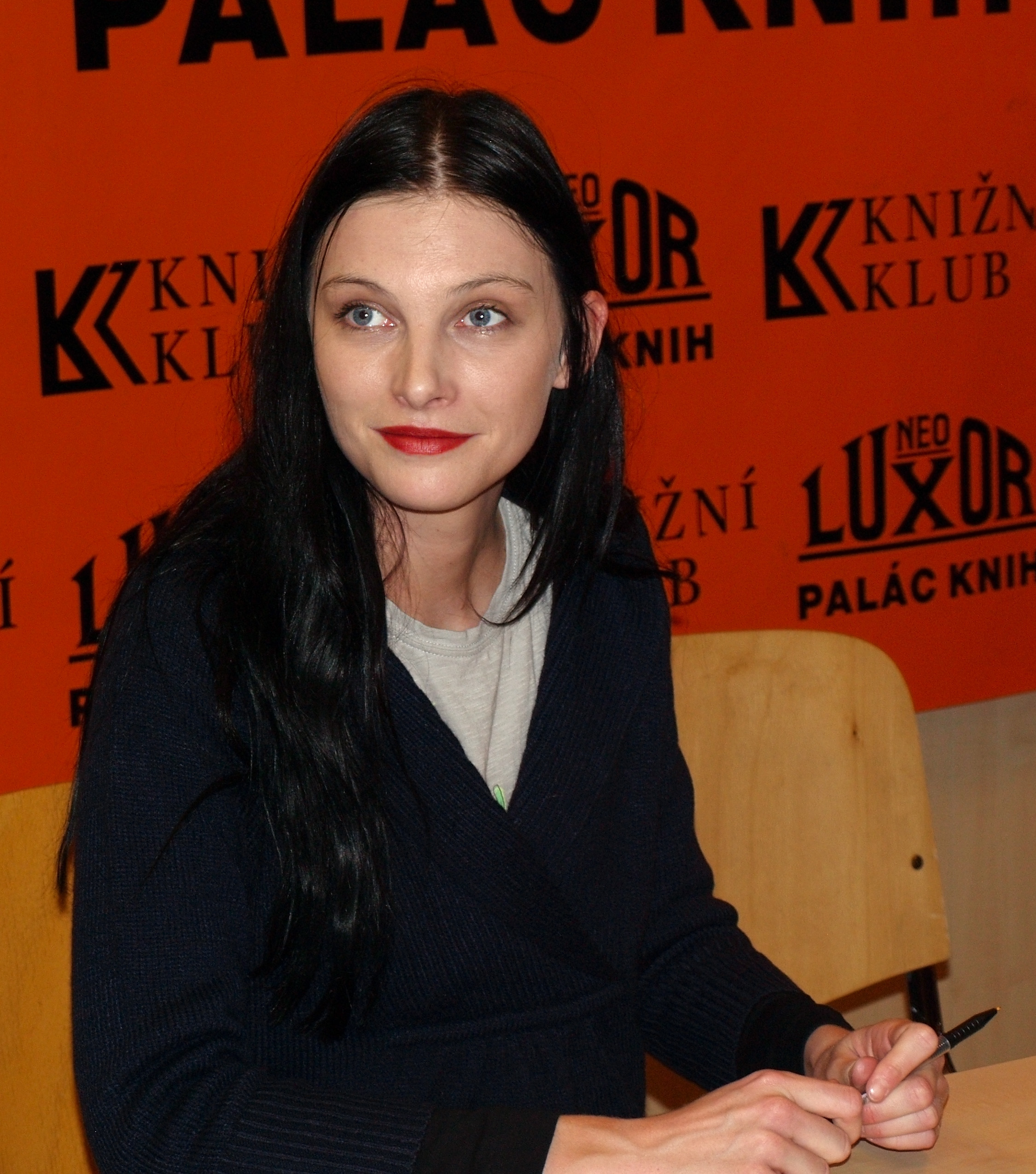
- Frühlingová in 2009

Background information
- Born: 11 May 1982 (age 44); Litvínov, Czechoslovakia
- Genres: Blues, Pop,
- Years active: 2003–present
- Label: EMI

Iva Frühlingová (born 11 May 1982 in Litvínov, Czechoslovakia) is a Czech female singer and model, famous in the Czech Republic and France. Despite her Czech descent she sings mostly in French.

== Biography ==
Frühlingová was born in Litvínov, Czechoslovakia, now Czech Republic. When she was 14 years old she moved to Paris to work as a model. She joined a music group called Turn Over and her singing led to a four-album record deal from Virgin Records. In France she released her first album called Litvínov, in 2003. The album was certified gold and platinum in the Czech Republic. Two singles from the album charted in Belgium and France.

In 2004 Frühlingová left Paris and moved back to Prague. She released her second album – Baby Doll – in 2005. She was nominated for Discovery of the Year at the 2005 Český slavík awards, although eventually the winner was Vlastimil Horváth. She subsequently went on her first concert tour in Spring 2006. At the end of 2006 Frühlingová won the Jumper of the Year award for female singers at the 2006 Český slavík awards.

In early 2007 Frühlingová was named second place for Best Female Singer at the Žebřík 2006 awards. She won the Best Website award at the Anděl Allianz 2006 awards. In November 2007 she released her third album – Strip Twist. In January 2008 Frühlingová was among 10 acts who took part in Eurosong, a contest run by Czech Television to select the nation's entry for that year's Eurovision Song Contest, singing her song, "Partir et revenir". Tereza Kerndlová was selected as the country's representative. A couple of months later she placed third for Best Female Singer at the Žebřík 2007 awards.

In 2009 she started a group, No Panic, with Peter Boška and Václav Polanský. The same year she published a book Příběhy modelek. She published further books: Příběhy ze showbyznysu in 2012, and Terapie v noci in 2017.

== Personal life ==
Frühlingová married singer and actor Richard Krajčo in August 2005; they announced they were getting a divorce less than six months later. She later married Jan Veselý, with whom she has a son.

== Discography ==
Albums

- Litvínov (2003)
- Baby Doll (2005)
- Strip Twist (2007)
- Doma nejlíp s No Pan!c (2010)
- Retrospektive BEST OF (2010)
- Chic á Paris (2013)

Singles

- Où tu veux, quand tu veux (Litvinov)
- La Muerte (Litvinov)
- J'ai eu tort (Litvinov)
- D part (Baby Doll)
- I Believe (Baby Doll)
- Waterbed (Strip Twist)
- La Chanson De Pierre – The single was sung with French actor Pierre Richard
- I do not address (At home best)
- Hey Hey Hey (Chic & Paris)
