= Nora Fridrichová =

Czech television presenter

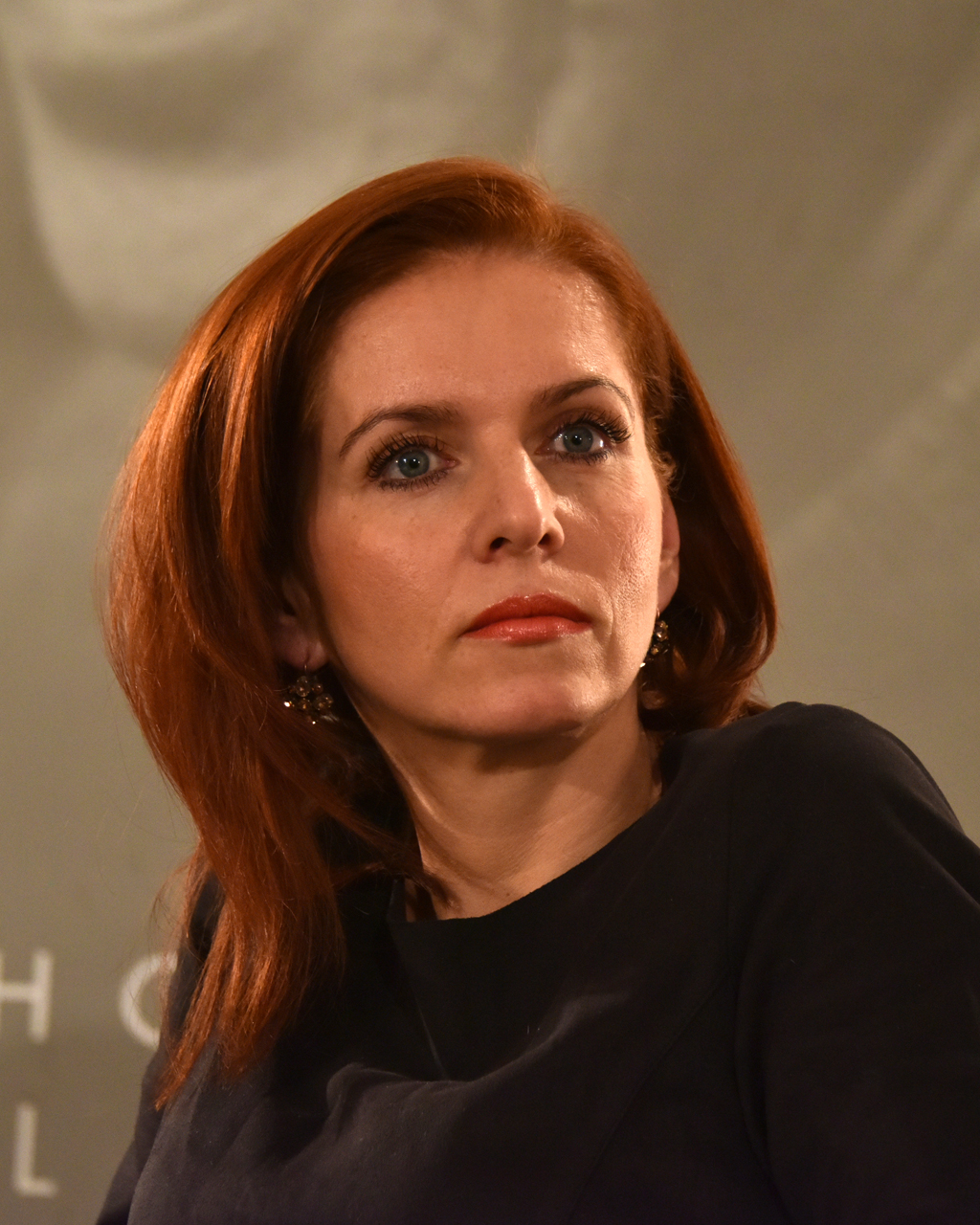
- Nora Fridrichová (2019)
- Born: Nora Nováková; 13 September 1977 (age 48); Pardubice, Czechoslovakia
- Education: Charles University; University of London
- Occupation: TV presenter
- Years active: 1998–present
- Spouses: Milan Fridrich (m. 2004; div. 2008) Robert Záruba (m. 2011)

Nora Fridrichová (née Nováková; born 13 September 1977) is a Czech television presenter, who worked for Czech television channel Czech Television from 2000 to 2024. She presented the programme 168 hodin (lit. '168 hours') from 2006 to 2024. She was awarded the Novinářská křepelka prize in 2011, for journalists under 33 years of age.

Fridrichová started her YouTube channel on 28 February 2025.

== Personal life ==
Fridrichová, married Milan Fridrich in 2004; they divorced in 2008. Fridrichová has two daughters, Diana and Mariana, with partner Robert Záruba, who is a sportscaster with the same channel.
