= Jana Švandová =

Czech actress

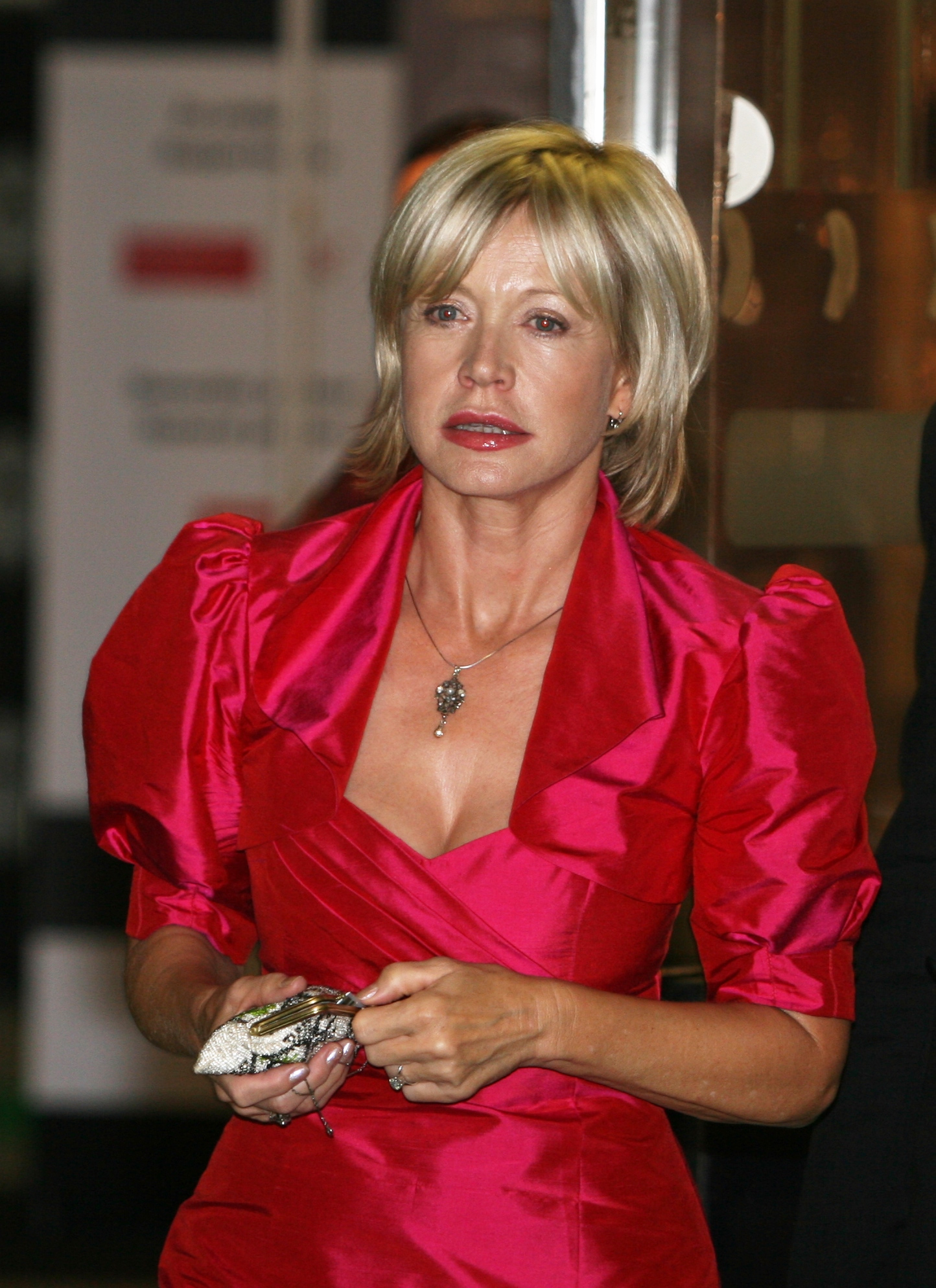
- Born: 3 July 1947 (age 78); Prague, Czechoslovakia (now Czech Republic)
- Occupation: Actress
- Years active: 1969-present

Jana Švandová (born 3 July 1947) is a Czech actress. She has appeared in more than 65 films and television shows since 1969.

== Selected filmography ==
- Svět otevřený náhodám (1971)
- Lovers in the Year One (1973)
- The Garden (1995)
- 2Bobule (2009)
