= Pavlína Němcová =

Czech model, actress and producer (born 1972)

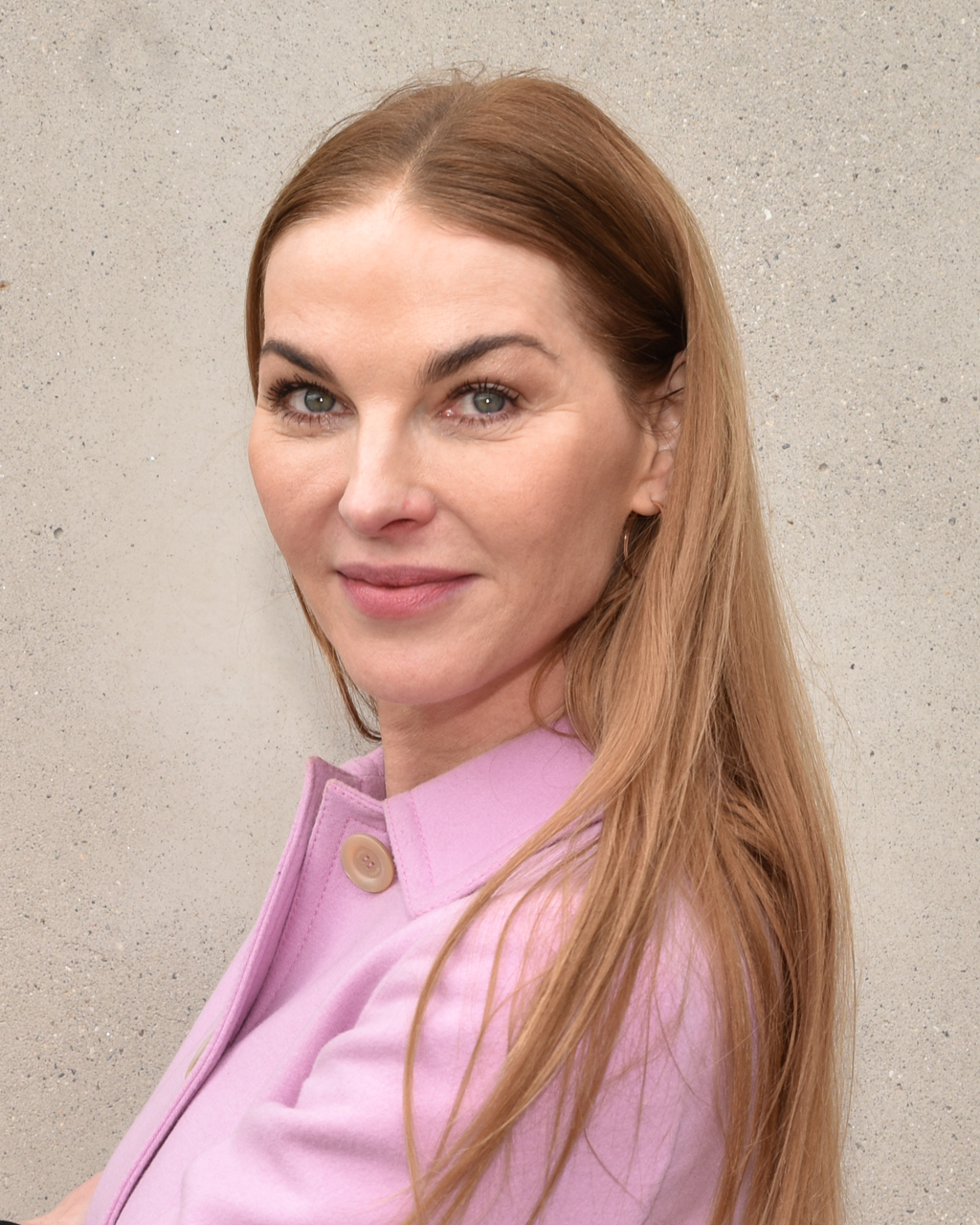
- Pavlína Němcová in 2022
- Born: 18 February 1972 (age 54); Děčín, ČSSR
- Other names: Pavlína Němcová; Paulína Bakarová; Paulina Rocio
- Occupations: Model, actress, producer, lawyer
- Years active: 1991–present
- Organization: Icone Production (since 2008)
- Website: paulinanemcova.com

Pavlína Němcová (born 18 February 1972 in Děčín, Czechoslovak Socialist Republic) is a Czech model, actress and producer.

== Biography ==
Němcová enrolled into the Actors Studio in New York, taking Jack Waltzer's classes for one year. After acting in a few American independent film projects, such as Salome’s Kiss and Damaged, and playing small parts in European films like Colditz and Modern Love, Němcová obtained the role of the American journalist who interviews Edith Piaf/Marion Cotillard in La Vie en Rose. She was then cast as Olga in La Guerre des Miss – The War of the Beauty Queens, released in France in January 2009. An Italian drama from Roberto Faenza filmed in English immediately followed: The Case of Unfaithfull Klara.

== Filmography ==
Year	Title	Role	Notes
1999	Chambre n° 13		French TV series, episode "Chair en vie"
2001	No, Not Now	Lost girl	Short film
2003	Salome's Kiss	Woman	Short film, also co-executive producer (as Paulina Rocio)
2003	Metamorphosis		Danish short film
2005	Colditz	Swiss woman in bar	TV film, uncredited
2006	The Prince & Me 2: The Royal Wedding	Princess Gabrielle	DtV film
2007	La Vie en Rose (aka La Môme)	American journalist	French
2008	Modern Love	Ingrid	French TV film
2008	Cellule Identité	Jeune femme golf	French TV series, episode "Félix"
2008	La Guerre des miss	Olga	French
2009	The Case of Unfaithful Klara	Ruth	Italian film
2010	Das Geheimnis der Wale	Dr. Karuna	German TV film
2012	The Writer	Paully	English-French
