= Mahulena Bočanová =

Czech actress (*1967)

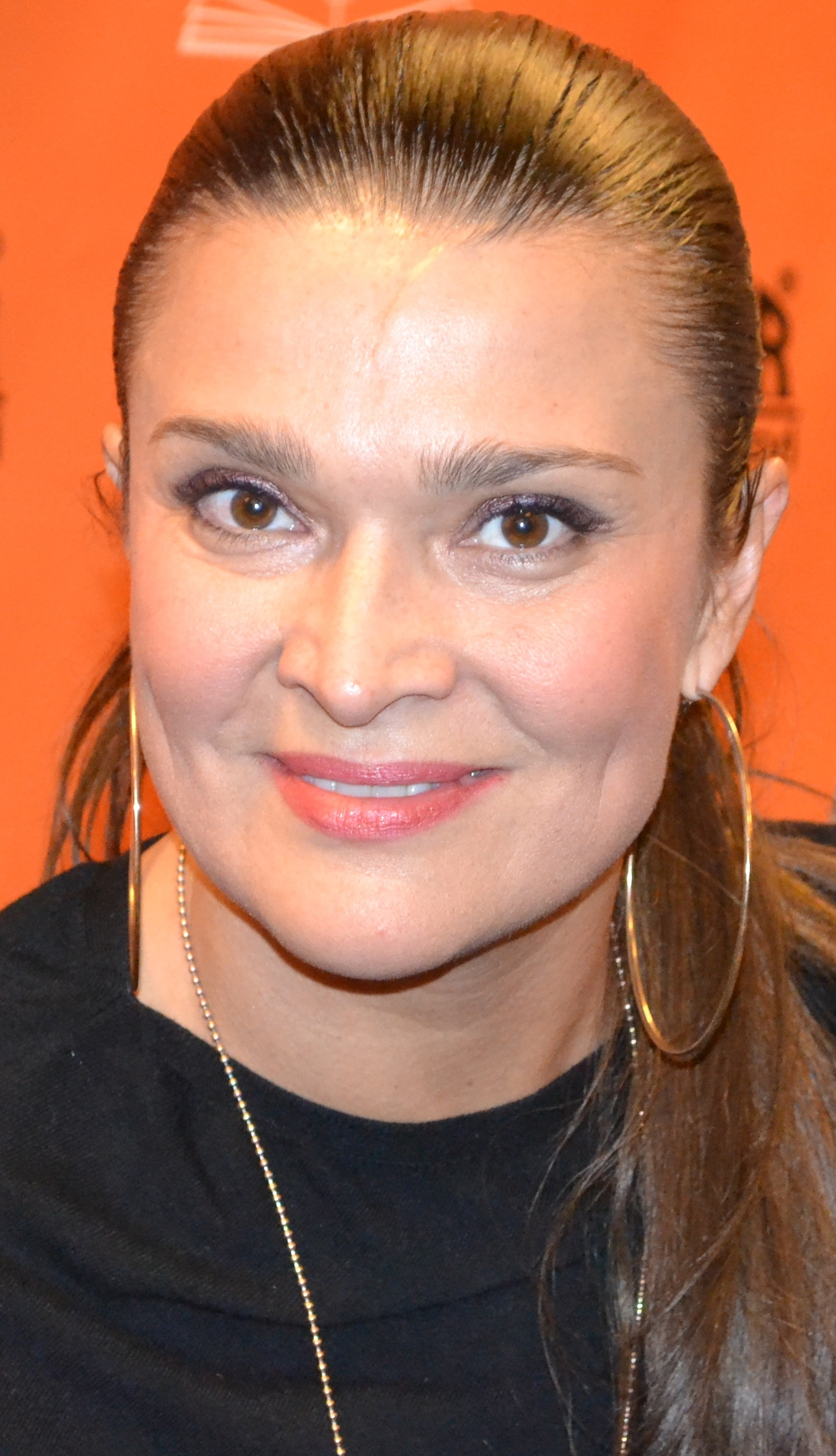
- Mahulena Bočanová (2012)
- Born: 18 March 1967 (age 58); Prague, Czechoslovakia
- Occupation(s): Actress, Presenter
- Years active: 1975–present
- Children: 1

Mahulena Bočanová (born 18 March 1967 in Prague) is a Czech actress and presenter. Since 2008, she works for ČRo1 Radiožurnál, a Czech radio-journal.

== Selected filmography ==
Year	Title	Role	Notes
1980	Lucy the Menace of Street		TV series
1982	Unterwegs nach Atlantis		TV series
1995	Golet v údolí		
