= Václav Vydra (actor, born 1956) =

Czech actor

- Vydra in 2019
- Born: 7 January 1956 (age 70); Prague, Czechoslovakia
- Occupation: Actor

Václav Vydra (born 7 January 1956) is a Czech theater, television and film actor. He was born as the son of Václav Vydra and Dana Medřická. His grandfather Václav Vydra was also a notable actor in Czechoslovakia and Director of the National Theater from 1945 to 1949.

Vydra has worked in several theater associations, such as in the theater in Kladno, Mladá Boleslav and later in urban theaters of Prague.

He has made nearly 60 appearances in television and film in the Czech Republic.

== Filmography ==
- 2008 – Vy nám taky, šéfe!
- 2005 - Kameňák 3
- 2004 - Kameňák 2
- 2003 - Kameňák
- 2001 - Z pekla štěstí 2
- 1999 - Z pekla štěstí
- 1997 - Zdivočelá země
- 1996 - Pinocchiova dobrodružství
- 1995 - Má je pomsta | Učitel tance
- 1994 - Helimadoe | V erbu lvice
- 1993 - Jedna kočka za druhou | Kaspar Hauser
- 1992 - Černí baroni
- 1991 - Skús ma objať | Tankový prapor
- 1988 - Dobří holubi se vracejí | Oznamuje se láskám vašim
- 1987 - Copak je to za vojáka... | Zuřivý reportér
- 1986 - Salar
- 1984 - S čerty nejsou žerty
- 1982 - Fandy, ó Fandy | Poslední propadne peklu
- 1980 - Půl domu bez ženicha | V hlavní roli Oldřich Nový
- 1973 - Přijela k nám pouť
- 1970 - Zabil jsem Einsteina, pánové
