= Marek Eben =

Czech actor, singer, composer, and writer (born 1957)

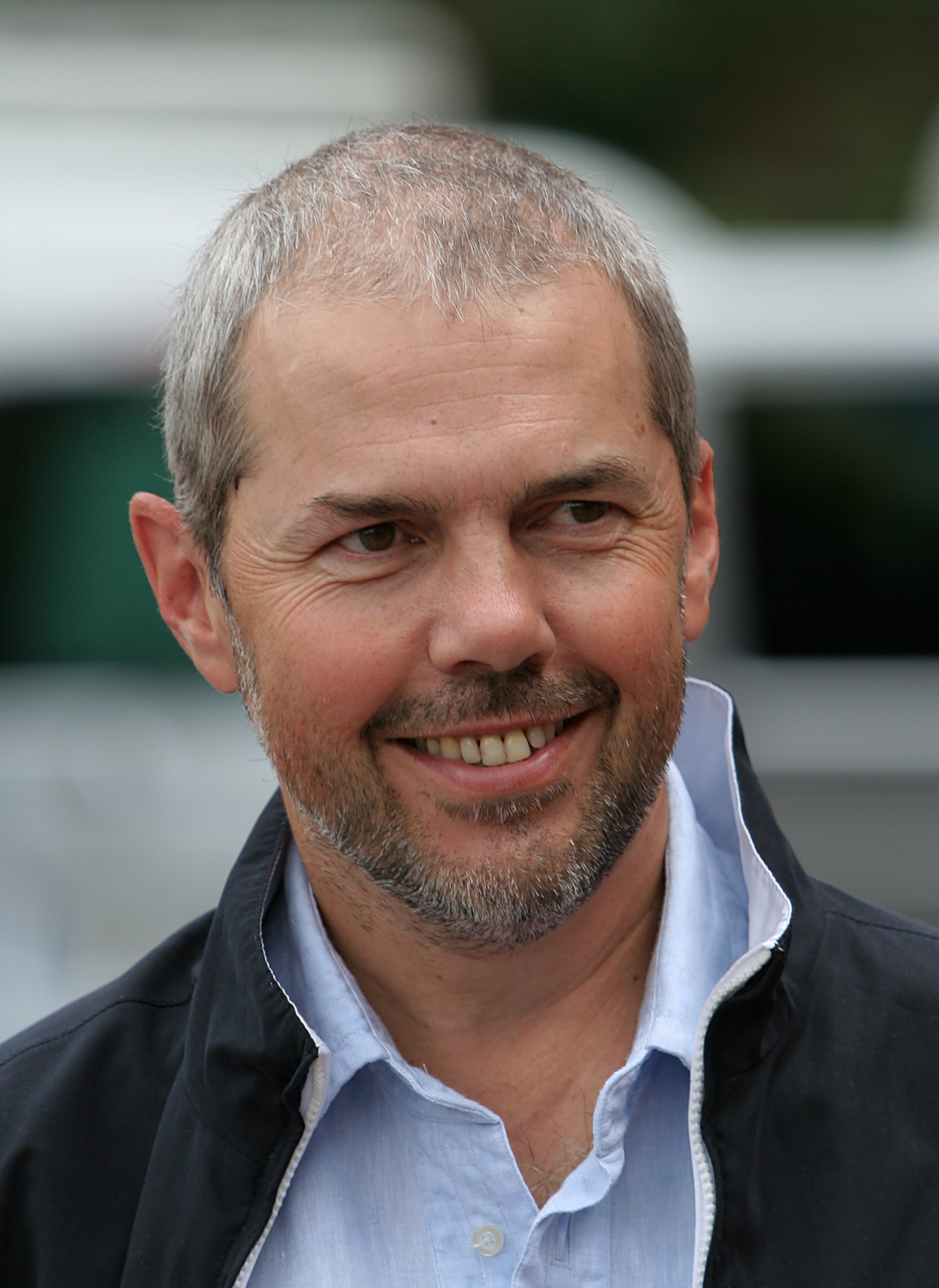
- Marek Eben at 42nd KV IFF

Background information
- Born: Marek Eben; 18 December 1957 (age 68)
- Origin: Prague, Czechoslovakia
- Genres: Rock, Folk, Jazz
- Occupations: Actor, singer, composer, writer, television host
- Website: www.bratriebenove.cz

Marek Eben (born 18 December 1957) is a Czech actor, singer, composer, writer and television host.

== Career ==
Eben studied music and drama at the Prague Conservatory. His father, Petr Eben, and his uncle Ilja Hurník were both composers. With his brothers Kryštof and David, he formed a band "Bratři Ebenové" (Eben Brothers) in 1984, with Marek as the writer, composer and singer.

Eben has won a number of awards for his work as a TV presenter. His presenting work includes the Czech version of Dancing with the Stars, and the long-running Czech Television talk show Na plovárně ("At the swimming-pool"), in which he interviews international celebrities. He also participates in the organization of the Karlovy Vary International Film Festival. He is openly Christian, and is known for his polite interviewing style.
