= List of Czech television programmes =

This is a list of Czech television programmes.

== Czech language ==
=== 0–9 ===
- #annaismissing - crime thriller series
- #martyisdead - crime thriller series
- 1. mise - action drama television series
- 3 plus 1 s Miroslavem Donutilem - comedy television series
- 4teens - comedy television series

=== A ===
- Ach, ty vraždy! - crime comedy television series
- Adikts - comedy/drama television series
- Advokát ex offo - drama television series
- Aféry - drama television series
- Ahoj sídliště - children's television series
- Agrometal - comedy television series
- Alexandr Dumas starší - historical television series
- Anatomie života - drama television series
- Anatomie zrady (Betrayer) - historical television film
- Aneta - children's television series
- Anne Frank: The Whole Story - historical television film
- Arabela - children's television series
- Arabela se vrací aneb Rumburak králem Říše pohádek - children's television series
- Arrowsmith - romantic television series
- Ať žijí rytíři! - adventure children's television series
- Autobazar Monte Karlo - comedy series
- Autodílna na kraji města - children's television series
- Až po uši - romantic television series

=== B ===
- Bakaláři - comedy television series
- Bambinot - science fiction comedy television series
- Banáni - comedy television series
- Bastardi - drama television series
- Bazén - children's television series
- Bez vědomí - thriller television series
- Bez ženské a bez tabáku - comedy television series
- Bezdružice - comedy television series
- Bob and Bobek - animated TV show made by Vladimir Jiranek.
- Bodyguardi (The Bodyguards) - crime/comedy series
- Bohéma - drama television series
- Bóra - crime/comedy series
- Borgia - historical drama television series
- Boříkovy lapálie - children's miniseries
- Božena - historical miniseries
- Boží mlýny - crime television series
- Bronzová spirála - historical miniseries
- Bubu a Filip - children's television series
- Bůh s námi - od defenestrace k Bílé hoře - historical television film
- Buldok z Poděbrad - crime/comedy television series
- Byl jednou jeden dům (Once There Was a House) - historical war television series
- Byli jednou dva písaři (They were once two scribes) - comedy television series
- Bylo nás pět - comedy television series
- Bylo nás šest - children's comedy television series

=== C ===
- Čapkovy kapsy - anthology crime/comedy television series.
- Čechovi - drama television series
- Celebrity - Stand-up comedy show
- Černá sanitka - comedy drama television series
- Černá země - drama television series
- Černé vdovy - crime/comedy drama television series
- Černí andělé - horror/thriller television series.
- Černí baroni - comedy television series
- České století - historical television series
- Český Robinson - drama television series
- Cesty domů - children's television series
- Četnické humoresky (Cops and Robbers) - crime/comedy television series.
- Četníci z Luhačovic (Policemen from Luhačovice) - crime/comedy television series.
- Chalupáři (The Cottagers) - comedy television series
- Chlap - drama series
- Chlapci a chlapi (Boys and Men) - drama television series
- Chobotnice z II. patra - children's miniseries
- Cirkus Bukowsky - crime television series
- Cirkus Humberto - historical drama television series
- Clona - crime thriller television series
- Co ste hasiči - comedy television series
- Co teď a co potom? - drama television series
- Comeback - television sitcom
- Ctná paní Lucie - adventure television series
- Čtvrtá hvězda - comedy television series
- Cukrárna - children's television series
- Cyranův ostrov - television sitcom

=== D ===
- Ďábel v Praze - children's television series
- Ďáblova lest (Satan's Stratagem) - mystery television film
- Dáma a Král (Lady and the King) - crime television series
- Dabing Street - comedy television series
- Dcera národa (The Daughter of the Nation) - romantic historical series
- Detektiv Martin Tomsa - action crime television series
- Detektivky podle Proškové - series of crime television films
- Detektivové od Nejsvětější Trojice - series of crime television miniseries
- Devadesátky (Nineties) - crime television series
- Dispečer - comedy television series
- Dlouhá bílá stopa - children's television series
- Dlouhá míle - sport drama television series
- Dnes v jednom domě - comedy drama television series
- Dobrá čtvrť (The Good District) - drama television series
- Dobrá Voda - sport/children's television series
- Dobré ráno, Brno! (Good Morning, Brno!) - comedy television series
- Dobré zprávy - comedy television series
- Dobrodružství kriminalistiky (Adventure of Criminalistics) - anthology crime television series.
- Dobrodružství šesti trampů - musical/adventure television series.
- Docent - crime miniseries
- Dokonalý svět - drama television series
- Doktor Martin - comedy television series
- Doktor z vejminku - comedy television series
- Doktorka Kellerová - psychological crime drama television series
- Doktoři z Počátků - drama television series
- Dovolená v protektorátu (Holiday in the Protectorate) - reality show
- Draculův švagr - crime/horror television series
- Drazí sousedé - children's television series
- Dreyfusova aféra - historical miniseries
- Druhý dech - drama television series
- Duhový luk - adventure crime drama television series
- Duch - crime television series
- Duch český - television sitcom
- Dvojka na zabití - crime/comedy television series.
- Dům poslední radosti - comedy television series
- Dynastie Nováků - children's television series

=== E ===
- Eden - crime television series.
- Einstein – Případy nesnesitelného génia - crime/comedy television series.
- Eliška a Damián - adventure/fantasy/romantic television series.
- Eliška a její rod - comedy television series.
- Ententýky - comedy drama television series.
- Expozitura (Expozitura) - action crime series
- Extraktoři (Extractors) - action spy series.

=== F ===
- F. L. Věk - historical series
- Fantom operety - comedy series
- Ferda mravenec (Ferdy the Ant) - animated children's series

=== G ===
- Gottwald - biographical series
- Guru - drama miniseries
- Gympl s (r)učením omezeným - comedy television series.

=== H ===
- Haldy - drama television series.
- Haunted - paranormal pseudo-documentary series
- Helena - television sitcom
- Herec (Actor) - thriller drama miniseries
- Heřmánci - children's series
- Hlava Medúzy - crime television series.
- Hop nebo trop - adventure comedy television series.
- Horákovi - children's comedy series
- Hořký svět - comedy television series
- Hořící keř (Burning Bush) - drama miniseries
- Hospoda (Pub) - comedy television series
- Hostinec „U koťátek“ - comedy television series
- Hotel Herbich - drama television series
- Hraběnky - drama television series
- Hrdina - crime television series
- Hříchy pro diváky detektivek - crime/comedy television series.
- Hříchy pro pátera Knoxe - anthology crime/comedy television series.
- Hříšní lidé města brněnského (The Sinful People of Brno) - crime/comedy television series.
- Hříšní lidé města pražského (The Sinful People of Prague) - crime/comedy television series.
- Hvězdy nad hlavou - romantic comedy television series.
- Hvězdy nad Syslím údolím - comedy television series.

=== I ===
- I ve smrti sami - war drama miniseries
- Inspektor Max - crime television series
- Inženýrská odysea - drama television series
- Iveta - biographical miniseries

=== J ===
- Já, Mattoni (I, Mattoni) - biographical television series
- Jahody na stéble trávy - Drama miniseries
- Jak si nepodělat život (How Not to Screw Up Your Life) - anthology miniseries
- Jan Hus - historical television film
- Jana Eyrová - biographical television series
- Jedna rodina - comedy television series
- Jetelín - comedy series
- Jitřní záře (Morning Glow) - drama series
- Josef a Ly - children's series

=== K ===
- Kačenka a strašidla - children's series
- Kamarádi - adventure television series
- Kamarádi Dobré vody - adventure television series
- Kameňák - comedy television series
- Kamenný řád - drama television series
- Kancelář Blaník - comedy series
- Kancl (The Office) - comedy television series
- Kapitán Exner - crime television series.
- Kauza Kramný - documentary series.
- Kde padají hvězdy ( Where Stars Fall) - children's series
- Když se slunci nedaří (When the Chips Are Down) - children's series
- Klapzubova jedenáctka - sport comedy television series
- Klaun Ferdinand (Clown Ferdinand) - children's series
- Klec plná opic - sport comedy television series
- Knightfall - historical fiction drama television series
- Komedie o manželství a sexu - comedy series of television films
- Komu šplouchá na maják - anthology children's series
- Konec dětských lásek - drama television series
- Konec velkých prázdnin - drama television series
- Kosmo (Cosmic) - science fiction comedy series
- Král Šumavy: Fantom temného kraje (The King of Šumava: The Phantom of the Dark Land) - crime thriller miniseries
- Krejzovi - comedy television series
- Krematorium - comedy web series
- Krev zmizelého (Shadows of the Deceased) - drama miniseries
- Kriminálka 5.C - children's crime series
- Kriminálka Anděl - crime television series
- Kriminálka Staré Město - crime television series
- Křeček v noční košili (Hamster in a Nightshirt) - science fiction comedy series
- Kukačky - comedy/drama television series

=== L ===
- Labyrint - crime thriller television series
- Lajna (The Line) - comedy series
- Láska v čase korony - comedy series
- Laskavý divák promine - biographical series
- Lebo medveď - documentary series
- Legenda o živých mrtvých - war drama series
- Lékárníkových holka - comedy television series
- Létající Čestmír (The Flying Cestmír) - children's television series
- Letící Delfín - drama series
- Letiště - drama series
- Lidé na křižovatce - drama miniseries
- Liga mužské moudrosti - comedy series
- Limity - comedy series
- Linka - action drama miniseries
- Logaritmus lásky - drama miniseries
- Lovec - crime mystery television series
- Lynč - crime drama television series

=== M ===
- Mach a Šebestová (Mach and Šebestová) - animated series
- Maharal – Tajemství talismanu - adventure television series
- Malá velká liga - comedy series
- Malé dějiny jedné rodiny - comedy television series
- Málo mě znáš - documentary series
- Malý pitaval z velkého města (Minor Tales of Crime from a Major City) - crime television series
- Mamon - crime thriller series
- Manželská tonutí - comedy series
- Manželské etudy (Marriage Stories) - documentary series
- Manželské etudy po dvaceti letech (Marriage Stories 20 Years Later) - documentary series
- Manželské etudy po 35 letech (Marriage Stories 35 Years Later) - documentary series
- Manželské etudy: Nová generace (Marriage Stories: New Generation) - documentary series
- Manželství po česku - comedy series
- Marie Terezie - historical miniseries
- Marta a Věra - television sitcom
- Marťanský dopoledník - musical series
- Matematika zločinu (Mathematics of Crime) - crime miniseries
- Matka - drama series
- Mazalové - comedy series
- Maxipes Fik - animated series
- Medvědi nic nevědí - children's series
- Metanol (Methanol) - crime television film
- Metoda Markovič: Hojer (The Markovič Method: Hojer) - crime miniseries.
- Miluju tě navždy, táta - drama series
- Milionáři - comedy series
- Místo nahoře - drama series
- Místo zločinu České Budějovice - crime television series
- Místo zločinu Ostrava - crime television series
- Místo zločinu Plzeň - crime television series
- Místo v životě - children's series
- Modré stíny (Blue Shadows) - crime drama miniseries
- Modrý kód - action/comedy/drama television series
- Moje srdcová sedma - drama series
- Mordparta - crime television series
- Most! - comedy television series
- Motel Anathema - horror comedy series
- Mozaika (Mosaic) - comedy series
- Mrazivá tajemství (The Dark Secret) - animated comedy series
- Muzikanti - musical series
- Muž na radnici - drama television series
- Muž v pozadí - historical drama miniseries
- Muž, který nesmí zemřít - adventure crime drama miniseries
- My holky z městečka - children's series
- My všichni školou povinní - children's television series
- My z konce světa - children's television series

=== N ===
- Na cestě (On the Road) - documentary travelogue series
- Na lavici obžalovaných justice - mysterious drama television series
- Na vlnách Jadranu - crime television series
- Na vodě - comedy television series
- Nadměrné maličkosti - comedy television series
- Nádraží - comedy television series
- Náhrdelník (The Necklace) - romantic drama television series
- Náměstíčko - comedy drama television series
- Nanebevstoupení Lojzka Lapáčka - drama television series
- Národní házená - comedy television series
- Náves - comedy drama television series
- Návštěvníci (The Visitors) - sci-fi television series
- Nejmladší z rodu Hamrů - drama television series
- Největší Čech (The Greatest Czech) - television show
- Největší z Pierotů - biographical series
- Nejvyšší soud - drama television series
- Nemocnice na kraji města (Hospital at the End of the City) - drama television series
- Nemocnice na kraji města po dvaceti letech (Hospital at the End of the City, Twenty Years On) - drama television series
- Nemocnice na kraji města – nové osudy (Hospital at the End of the City – The New Generation) - drama television series
- Neviditelní - adventure comedy television series
- Nevinné lži - drama television series
- Noha 22 - television sitcom
- Nováci - television sitcom

=== O ===
- O mě se neboj (I'll be fine) - romantic comedy series
- O ztracené lásce - fantasy television series
- O zvířatech a lidech - children's television series
- Oběti - drama television series
- Obchoďák - comedy drama television series
- Obyčejná koňská historie - children's television series
- Odsouzené - drama television series
- Odvolací soud - drama television series
- Odznak Vysočina - crime television series
- Ohnivé ženy - comedy television film trilogy
- Ohnivý kuře - comedy television series
- Ohrožené prázdniny - adventure children's miniseries
- Ochránce (The Defender) - crime drama television series
- Okno do hřbitova - mysterious comedy television series
- Okres na severu - drama television series
- Okresní přebor (District League) - comedy television series
- Oktopus - crime television series
- On je žena! - comedy television series
- Ona a On - comedy television series
- Ordinace v růžové zahradě (Doctor's office in the rose garden) - Soap opera series
- Osada - comedy television series
- Ostrov jistoty - drama miniseries
- Ošklivka Katka - comedy television series

=== P ===
- Pád domu Kollerů - romantic comedy series
- Pan profesor - romantic comedy television series
- Pan Tau - children's television series
- PanMáma - television sitcom
- Panoptikum Města pražského - crime/comedy television series.
- Paragrafy na kolech - comedy television series.
- Pat & Mat - animated series
- Pátá stanice - drama series
- Pěstírna - thriller series
- Pět let (Five Years) - drama series
- Pět mrtvých psů - crime miniseries
- Píseň pro Rudolfa III. - comedy musical television series.
- Plechová kavalerie - drama television series
- Po hlavě - comedy television series.
- Počkej si na bílé štěstí - sport children's series
- Pod hladinou (Below the Surface) - crime television series
- Podezřelé prázdniny - adventure miniseries
- Podezření (Suspicion) - crime miniseries
- Podnájemníci - comedy television film trilogy
- Pochodeň (The Torch) - sci-fi television series
- Pojďte pane, budeme si hrát (Hey Mister, Let's Play!) - animated series
- Pojišťovna štěstí - Soap opera series
- Polda - crime/comedy television series
- Poldové a nemluvně -crime/comedy television series
- Policajti z centra - crime television series
- Policajti z předměstí (Suburb Cops) - television sitcom
- Policejní pohádky strážmistra Zahrádky - comedy miniseries
- Policie Hvar - crime/comedy series
- Policie Modrava - crime television series
- Pomalé šípy - comedy television series
- Poručík Petr - crime television series
- Poslední oběť (Last Sacrifice) - crime drama miniseries
- Poslední sezona - sport drama television series
- Poste restante - comedy television series
- Postel s nebesy - drama television series
- Pra pra pra - comedy television series
- Pražský písničkář - musical drama television series
- Pražský student - drama miniseries
- Premiér - television sitcom
- Prima sezóna - romantic series
- Princezna ze mlejna (The Watermill Princess) - children's television series
- Princezna ze mlejna 2 (The Watermill Princess 2) - children's television series
- Princip slasti (The Pleasure Principle) - crime thriller series
- Proč bychom se netopili - comedy television series
- Profesionálové - television sitcom
- Profesor T. - crime television series
- První krok - comedy television series
- První republika (The First Republic) - historical drama television series
- Přátelé Zeleného údolí - adventure children's television series
- Přejděte na druhou stranu - comedy television series
- Přešlapy - comedy television series
- Příkopy - anthology drama television series
- Případ kapitána Bábovky - crime television series
- Případ pro exorcistu - crime miniseries
- Případ pro zvláštní skupinu - crime/comedy television series
- Případ Roubal (The Roubal Case) - crime drama miniseries
- Případy 1. oddělení (Major Case Squad) - crime television series
- Případy detektivní kanceláře Ostrozrak - crime/comedy television series
- Případy podporučíka Haniky - crime television series
- Přísahám a slibuji - drama television series
- Přístav - romantic comedy television series
- Přítelkyně z domu smutku - drama television series
- Přízraky mezi námi - adventure children's television series
- Psí povídání - children's television series
- Půlnoční zpověď (Midnight Confession) - psychological drama television series
- Pustina (Wasteland) - drama television series

=== R ===
- Ranč U Zelené sedmy - children's comedy television series
- Rapl - action crime television series
- Redakce - comedy television series
- Rédl - crime miniseries
- Reportérka - drama miniseries
- Robinsoni z Kronborgu - children's television series
- Robot Emil - children's television series
- Rodáci - war drama television series
- Rodina Bláhova - children's comedy television series
- Rodinka - children's comedy television series
- Rodinná pouta - Soap opera series
- Rodinné vztahy - drama television series
- Rozpaky kuchaře Svatopluka - comedy television series
- Rozsudek - action crime drama series
- Rozsudek - documentary drama television series
- Rudyho má každý rád - television sitcom

=== S ===
- Sanitka - drama television series
- Sanitka 2 - drama television series
- Saturnin - comedy television series
- Sedm schodů k moci (Stairway to Power) - political drama series
- Šéfka - crime television series
- Šéfové - comedy television film series
- Semestr - comedy/drama series
- Sestřičky - action/comedy/drama television series
- Sever - crime thriller television series
- Sex O´Clock - comedy series
- Šípková Růženka - children's series
- Škoda lásky - anthology comedy television series
- Škola Na Výsluní - children's series
- Škola pro život - children's series
- sKORO NA mizině - comedy series
- Skvrna - drama series
- Slavné historky zbojnické - anthology adventure series
- Slovácko sa nesúdí - comedy television series
- Slunečná - romantic comedy television series
- Smysl pro tumor (Sense of Tumour) - comedy television series
- Sňatky z rozumu - historical drama series
- Snowboarďáci - comedy miniseries
- Soudce Alexandr - drama television series
- Soudce Stokroč - sport comedy television series
- Soudkyně Barbara - drama television series
- Soukromé pasti - drama television series
- Sousedé - Soap opera series
- Specialisté - crime television series
- Spravedlnost (Absolution) - Crime miniseries
- Správná šestka - children's series
- Špunti na cestě - children's series
- Start - children's series
- Stavy rachotí - drama series
- Štěstíčku naproti - crime/drama series
- Stíny v mlze - crime television series
- Stockholmský syndrom (Stockholm Syndrome) - crime thriller miniseries.
- Stopy zločinu - crime television series
- Stopy života - drama television series
- Straka - crime television series
- Strašidla a spol. - children's series
- Strážce duší (Guardian of Souls) - adventure television series
- Strážmistr Topinka - crime/comedy television series
- Stříbrná paruka - comedy television series
- Stříbrná pila - romantic drama television series
- Stříbrná žíla - children's series
- Studna - crime drama television series
- Svatby v Benátkách - romantic comedy television series
- Svět pod hlavou (World under the head) - Mysterious crime television series
- Světla pasáže - romantic drama television series
- Synové a dcery Jakuba skláře (The Sons and Daughters of Jakub the Glassmaker) - historical drama television series

=== T ===
- Tajemství proutěného košíku - children's series
- Tajemství rodu (The secret of the lineage) - genealogy documentary series
- Tak se ptám - anthology drama television series
- Taková normální rodinka (Just an Ordinary Family) - comedy television series
- Taneční - comedy television series
- Táta v nesnázích - children's comedy television series
- Tátové na tahu - comedy television series
- TBH - drama series
- Temný Kraj - crime television series
- Terapie - drama television series
- To jsem z toho jelen - comedy television series
- To nevymyslíš! - anthology comedy television series
- To se vysvětlí, soudruzi! (We are on it, Comrades!) - mystery comedy television series
- Trapasy - anthology comedy television series
- Trapný padesátky ( Fifty and Embarrassing) - romantic comedy television series
- Trpaslík (Gnome) - comedy television series
- Třešňová babička - adventure musical series
- Třetí patro - comedy television series
- Tři chlapi v chalupě - comedy television series
- Tři králové (Three Kings) - adventure war television series
- Třicet případů majora Zemana (Thirty Cases of Major Zeman) - action television series
- Tybys - comedy television series

=== U ===
- U nás doma - comedy series
- Uctivá poklona, pane Kohn - comedy television series
- Ulice - Soap Opera series
- Ultimátum - action crime series
- Útěk do Budína (Escape to Budin) - romantic drama series
- Území bílých králů (The Territory of White Deer) - adventure television series

=== V ===
- V.I.P. vraždy (V.I.P. Murders) - crime thriller television series
- Ve znamení Merkura - anthology crime/comedy television series
- Večerníček (Little Eveninger) - children's television program.
- Vedlejší produkt - psychological miniseries
- Vědma - fantasy television series
- Vegani a jelita - comedy television series
- Velitel - drama television series
- Velké sedlo - drama television series
- Velmi křehké vztahy - Soap opera series
- Velmi uvěřitelné příběhy - anthology horror series
- Věříš si? (Do you believe in yourself?) - game show for children
- Vetřelci a lovci - crime thriller television series
- Víla Amálka (Fairy Amálka) - animated series
- Vinaři - comedy television series
- Vlak dětství a naděje (The Train of Childhood and Expectation) - war/comedy/drama television series
- Vlastně se nic nestalo - drama series
- Vodník (Monsters of the Shore) - crime miniseries
- Volha (Volga) - comedy drama series
- Vraždy v Kraji - crime/comedy television series
- Vraždy v kruhu (The Zodiac Murders) - crime thriller television series
- Všechny moje lásky - romantic comedy television series
- Vyprávěj (Wonderful Times) - comedy/drama television series
- Vyšehrad - comedy television series
- Vytoč mého agenta (Call My Agent) - comedy television series
- Vzteklina (Rabies) - crime thriller series

=== Z ===
- Z hříček o královnách - historical drama television series.
- Z pekla štěstí - children's television series.
- Záhadné případy - fantasy television series
- Záchranári - adventure television series
- Zadními vrátky do ZOO za zvířátky - children's television series.
- Záhada hlavolamu (Mystery of the Puzzle) - adventure television series
- Záhada tří kapitánů - sci-fi miniseries
- Základka - television sitcom
- Zákony pohybu - drama television series.
- Zákony vlka (The Laws of the Wolf) - crime television series.
- Zalez do spacáku - comedy television series.
- Zdivočelá země (The Land Gone Wild) - adventure television series
- Žena za pultem (The Woman Behind The Counter) - drama television series.
- Živé terče (Living Targets) - crime miniseries
- Život a doba soudce A. K. (The Life and Time of Judge A.K.) - drama television series.
- Život na zámku (Life at the Mansion) - children's drama television series.
- Zkáza Dejvického divadla (The End of Dejvice Theatre) - comedy/drama television series.
- Zkoušky z dospělosti - children's television series.
- Zlá krev - historical drama television series.
- Zlatá labuť (The Department Store) - drama television series.
- Zločin na dobré cestě - crime comedy series
- Zločiny Velké Prahy (The Crimes of Greater Prague) - historical crime series.
- Znamení koně (Sign of the Horse) - drama television series.
- Zoo - children's television series.
- Zrádci (Rats) - crime thriller series
- Ztracená brána (Lost Gate) - mystery miniseries

== See also ==
- Lists of Czech films
