= List of original shows by TV Nova (Czech Republic) =

The following is a list of original programs of TV Nova network. Some of shows featuring already famous Czech actors (fe.: Ruská ruleta, Nováci), some of ones featuring now famous actors' and moderators' debuts (fe.: Kolotoč, Eso).

== Series ==
- Anatomie života (2021)
- Bóra (TBA)
- Buldok z Poděbrad (TBA)
- Chlap (2022)
- Co ste hasiči (2021–current)
- Dáma a Král (2017–2022)
- Dokonalý svět (2010)
- Doktoři z Počátků (2013–2016)
- Draculův švagr (1996)
- Drazí sousedé (2016)
- Extraktoři (2023–current)
- Gumy (Since 2022)
- Guru (2022)
- Gympl s (r)učením omezeným (2012–2013)
- Iveta (2022–2024)
- Jedna rodina (2022–current)
- Jitřní záře (2022)
- Kameňák (2019–2021)
- Král Šumavy: Fantom temného kraje (2022–current)
- Kriminálka Anděl (2008–current)
- Metoda Markovič: Hojer (2024)
- Metoda Markovič: Straka (TBA)
- Milionáři (TBA)
- Miluju tě navždy, táta (TBA)
- Místo v životě (2006–2008)
- Mozaika (2024–current)
- Mužketýři (2021–2022)
- Na vodě (2016)
- Národní házená (2022)
- Okresní přebor (2010)
- O mě se neboj (2022)
- Odznak Vysočina (2022–current)
- On je žena! (2005)
- Ordinace v růžové zahradě (2005–current)
- Organised Crime Unit (2011–2016)
- Pád domu Kollerů (TBA)
- Pan profesor (2021–2022)
- Pojišťovna štěstí (2004–2010)
- Policie Hvar (2024)
- Policie Modrava (2015–current)
- Profesor T. (2018)
- První krok (2012)
- Případ Roubal (2021)
- Případy mimořádné Marty (2022–current)
- Redakce (2004–2006)
- Sex O´Clock (2023–current)
- Soukromé pasti (2008; 2011)
- Specialisté (2017–current)
- Studna (TBA)
- Světla pasáže (2007)
- Šéfka (2022)
- Štěstíčku naproti (TBA)
- Taneční (2024–current)
- Táta v nesnázích (2023–current)
- Ulice (2005–current)
- Vědma (2023)
- Vegani a Jelita (2021)
- Vraždy v Kraji (TBA)
- Záhadné případy (2024–current)
- Zlatá labuť (2023–2024)

=== Sitcoms ===
- Comeback (2008–current)
- Helena (2012–2018)
- Hospoda (1996–1997)
- Nováci (1995–1996)
- PanMáma (2013)
- Policajti z předměstí (1998)

=== Documentary series ===
- Hasiči (2011)
- Kauza Kramný (2024)
- Lebo medveď (TBA)
- Málo mě znáš (2024)
- Případ Stodolovi (2024)
- Rigo (TBA)
- Ztracená rodina (2023–current)

== Quiz shows ==
- 1 proti 100 (2004–2005)
- Babeta
- Báječný ženský (2004)
- Bingo (1994–1997)
- Chcete být milionářem? (2000–2005;2016-)
- Jsi chytřejší než páťák? (2007)
- Karambol
- Kolotoč (1996-2003)
- Nejslabší! Máte padáka! (2002–2004)
- Neřeš, nepřepínej (2006)
- Pálí vám to? (2003–2005)
- Přísně tajné! (2008)
- Riskuj na kolotoč (1999?)
- Riskuj! (1994-2004)
- Tenkrát s Lucií Vondráčkovou (2004)
- Triga
- Tyjátr (2001–?)
- Úsměv, prosím! (2004)
- Uzel
- Vox populi (1994–?)
- Zvoňte dvakrát! (2006)

== Award shows ==
- ANNO (1995–2010)
- Česká Miss (2005–2010)
- Fotbalista roku (1998–2005)
- Miss Aerobic ČR (1996–2009)
- Miss ČR (1996–2008)
- Miss desetiletí (1997)
- Miss tisíciletí (2000)
- TýTý (2004–2008)
- Zlatá hokejka (1998–2005)

== News ==
- Snídaně s Novou (1994–current)
- Televizní noviny (1994–current)
- Právě dnes (1994–2004)

== Reality shows ==
- 4 svatby (2012)
- Babicovy dobroty (2008-current)
- Bailando (TV Nova show) (2007)
- Big Brother (2005)
- Česko hledá SuperStar (2004–2006)
- Dům snů (2009)
- Farma (2012)
- MasterChef (2012)
- Milionový pár (2005)
- Robinsonův ostrov (2017-current)
- Svatby paní Veroniky (2006)
- Vem si mě! (2007)
- Výměna manželek (2005-current)
- XXL (1998–????)

== Hobby-related shows ==
- Babicovy dobroty (2008–current)
- Grilování s Vodouchem (2012)
- Polepšovna mazlíčků (2008)
- Rady ptáka Loskutáka (2001–current)

== Publicistic shows ==
- 112 (2006–2011)
- Česko k neuvěření (2011–2012)
- Koření (2005–current)
- Na vaší straně (2024–current)
- Na vlastní oči (1994–2009, 2012–2013)
- Natvrdo (2008)
- Nová cestománie (2004–2006)
- Občanské judo (1994–2011)
- Příběhy bez scénáře (2010)
- Střepiny (2002-current)
- Víkend (2005-current)
- Vizita (2010)
- Volejte Novu (2003–current)
- Volejte řediteli (1994–2003)
- Za pět minut dvanáct (2023–current)

== Comedial shows ==
- Country estráda (2002–2005)
- Český bodyguard (1994–?)
- Čtveráci (1999–?)
- Čundrcountry show (1994–?)
- Dobroty (2001–2003)
- Go Go šou (2000–2006)
- Gumáci (1994)
- Horoskopičiny
- Karusoshow (1997)
- Lucie na bílo
- Natočto! (1998-2005)
- Novoty (1997)
- Paškál (2003)
- Politické harašení (1995-2003)
- Příběhy bez scénáře (2010)
- Ptákoviny (1994–2000, 2002)
- Rozjezdy pro hvězdy (1997–2003)
- Ruská ruleta (1994-1996)
- Rychlý prachy (1998–?)
- Scénky na scénu (2005)
- Senzibilšou (1997–?)
- Sígři ve výslužbě (2013)
- Skopičiny (1999–?)
- Souhvězdí Novy (2000–?)
- TELE TELE (2000-2007)
- Tenkrát na východě (2004)
- To nevymyslíš! (2005)
- Zlatá mříž (1998–2006)

== Talent shows ==
- Česko hledá SuperStar (2004-2006)
- Česko Slovenská Superstar (2009-2012)
- DO-RE-MI (1998-2004)
- Dům snů (2009-2010)
- Evergreen show (2006)
- Hlas Česko Slovenska (2012–2018)
- Mléčná dráha (2003)
- Talentmania (2010)
- X Factor (2008)

== Talk show ==
- Áčko (1997–?)
- Gilotina
- Hogo Fogo (2000–?)
- Kotel (1998–2006)
- Mr. GS (2008–2009)
- Neviňátka (2009)
- P.F.
- Prásk! (1998–2006, 2013–current)
- Sedmička (2001–2003)
- Tabu (1994-1999)
- VIP na cestách (2005–2006)
- Zlatíčka

== Other shows ==
- Dobré bydlo (1994–?)
- Eso (1994–2009)
- Ku-ku (2004–?)
- Maxi Clever (2006–2008)
- Mezi hvězdami (2011)
- Natvrdo (2008)
- Rande (1999)
- Věštírna (2000–?)
- Zálety (2002–?)
- Peříčko (1997–2003)
- Počasíčko (2000-2001)
