= List of original shows by Prima televize =

The following is a list of original programs of Prima televize network.

== Series ==
- 1. mise (2021–2022)
- 3 + 1 z Jetelína (2018)
- Aféry (2011)
- Agrometal (2023)
- Banáni (2023-current)
- Bazén (2005)
- Bodyguardi (2023-current)
- Cesty domů (2010–2015)
- Chataři ze Švihova (2024)
- Černé vdovy (2019-current)
- Dobré zprávy (2022-2023)
- Duch (2022-current)
- Dvojka na zabití (2021-current)
- Einstein – Případy nesnesitelného génia (2021-current)
- Eliška a Damián (2023)
- Hořký svět (2022)
- Hrdina (2024-current)
- Hvězdy nad hlavou (2021)
- Jetelín (2016–2018)
- Kamarádi (2024-current)
- Kapitán Exner (2017)
- Krejzovi (2018–2019)
- Křižovatky života (2013–2015)
- Letiště (2006–2007)
- Lež na pláži (2024)
- Linka (2019)
- Malá velká liga (2023)
- Modrý kód (2017–2020)
- Mordparta (2016–2017)
- Na vlnách Jadranu (2023)
- O mé rodině a jiných mrtvolách (2011)
- Obchoďák (2012)
- Ohnivý kuře (2016–2018)
- Ošklivka Katka (2008–2009)
- Pálava (2022)
- Po hlavě (2020)
- Pod hladinou (2023)
- Polda (2016–2024)
- Poslední oběť (2023)
- Přešlapy (2009–2010)
- Případ tanečnice (TBA)
- Přístav (2015-2017)
- Půlnoční zpověď (2023)
- Rodinka (2011)
- Rodinná pouta (2004-2006)
- Sedm schodů k moci (2023)
- Sestřičky (2020–2021)
- Slunečná (2020–2022)
- Svatby v Benátkách (2014–2015)
- Tátové na tahu (2018)
- Temný kraj (2017–2019)
- V.I.P. vraždy (2016–2018)
- Velmi křehké vztahy (2007–2009)
- Vinaři (2014–2015)
- Vytoč mého agenta (2024)
- Všechny moje lásky (2015–2016)
- Základka (2012)
- Zákony vlka (2023-current)
- Zalez do spacáku (2024)
- Zázraky života (2010–2012)
- Zoo (2022-2024)
- Zrození alchymistky (TBA)

== Quiz shows ==
- Ber nebo neber
- Milionář

== Award shows ==
- Mattoni Koktejl Festival

== News ==
- Krimi zprávy
- Hlavní zprávy
- Showtime
- Počasí

== Reality shows ==
- Ano, šéfe! (2009–2018)
- Ano, šéfová! (2018)
- Bar
- Rozpal to, šéfe! (2014–2021)
- Rozpal to ve Španělsku, šéfe! (2018)
- Vyvolení
- Zlatá maska
- Like House

== Publicistic shows ==
- Prima Svět (Since 1995)
- Autosalon.tv (Since 2005)
- Partie (Since 2005)
- Cesty k úspěchu(Since 2011)
- Cyklosalon.tv (Since 2021)
- Fotr na tripu (Since 2021)
- Případy Josefa Klímy (Since 2023)

== Comedial shows ==
- Inkognito
- Máme rádi Česko
- Nečum na mě show
- Můj muž to dokáže
- Prima Partička
- Telebazar

== Talent shows ==
- X Factor

== Talk show ==
- Show Jana Krause
- 7 pádů Honzy Dědka
- Jednou jsi dole, jednou nahoře
- QI

== Other shows ==
- Policie v akci
