= Polda (disambiguation) =

Polda is an adventure video game series developed by SleepTeam.

Polda may also refer to:

- Janez Polda (1924–1964), Yugoslavian between ski jumper
- Tone Polda (1917–1945), Slovenian Roman Catholic priest, poet, and writer
- Polda (TV series), Czech television series
