= Czech television =

Czech television may refer to:

- Television in the Czech Republic, including a list of television channels
- Czech Television, the public television broadcaster in the Czech Republic

== See also ==
- TV Nova (disambiguation)
- List of Czech television programmes
