= Policajti z předměstí =

- Genre: Comedy
- Starring: Josef Carda; Vlastimil Zavřel; Michal Suchánek; Milan Šimáček; Dagmar Ďásková; Aleš Háma
- Country of origin: Czech Republic
- Original language: Czech
- No. of seasons: 1
- No. of episodes: 21

Production
- Camera setup: multi camera
- Running time: 30 minutes

Original release
- Network: TV Nova
- Release: 1999

Policajti z předměstí (in English Suburb Cops) is a Czech television comedy series which premiered on TV Nova. In 1999, 21 episodes were aired.

== Plot ==
Stories about a small police station in the Strašnice district of Prague.

== Production ==
"Policajti z předměstí" was a third TV Nova sitcom after Nováci and Hospoda. A shooting started in 1998, and first episode was aired on February 2, 1999, in a day of fifth anniversary of TV Nova. Because of very bad reviews, a series was cancelled after 21 episodes.

== Cast and characters ==
- Josef Carda as lieutenant Sluníčko
- Vlastimil Zavřel as ensign Čermák
- Michal Suchánek as Kubele
- Milan Šimáček as Zajíček
- Dagmar Ďásková as sergeant Matušková
- Aleš Háma as sergeant Chroust

== List of Episodes ==
- 1.Velký šéf
- 2.Cesty zlata
- 3.Pivo pro policii
- 4.Anglicky snadno a rychle
- 5.V rytmu valčíku
- 6.Jak vypadat vážně
- 7.Vzorná jednotka
- 8.Lepší vyhořet
- 9.Zátah na pedofily
- 10.Veselé Velikonoce
- 11.Na holou ne!
- 12.Módní přehlídka
- 13.Byl pozdní večer
- 14.Rychlejší než světlo
- 15.Milování v přírodě
- 16.Akce čisté ruce
- 17.Zásah v pravou chvíli
- 18.Měsíc v úplňku
- 19.Poslední opravdový chlap
- 20.Nejkrásnější věk
- 21.Narozeniny s vyhláškou
