= Kamarádi =

- Genre: Adventure
- Written by: Jarmila Turnovská, Vlasta Janečková
- Directed by: Vlasta Janečková
- Starring: Marek Eben, Antonín Navrátil, Lenka Pletková, Michal Michálek
- Country of origin: Czechoslovakia
- Original language: Czech
- No. of seasons: 2
- No. of episodes: 13

Production
- Running time: 21–33 minutes
- Production company: Krátký film Praha

Original release
- Network: Czechoslovak Television
- Release: October 10, 1971 – January 3, 1975

Kamarádi (English: Friends) is a Czechoslovak adventure television series produced by Czechoslovak Television, which also broadcast it in the years 1971–1975. A total of 13 episodes were created in two seasons. The series was filmed by director Vlasta Janečková based on the script she wrote together with Jarmila Turnovská. He is devoted to a group of Prague children who experience various adventures in Prague and in the countryside.

== Plot ==
Two good friends, Ferda and Váleček, who live in Prague's Malá Strana, meet the same old Honza, who moved with his parents from Karlovy Vary to his grandfather, who lives in the same house as Ferda. Their acquaintance accompanied by an insult does not go ideally, so they consider him an arrogant intruder. Before long, however, they become friends, and they also meet Gábina, an active girl who likes to take pictures. This creates a group of children who experience various adventures in the streets of Prague, which eventually move to Gábina's aunt in the countryside in the Orlické Mountains.

== Cast ==
- Lenka Pletková as Gábina
- Michal Michálek as Ferda (only season 1)
- Antonín Navrátil as Honza
- Marek Eben as Valentýn „Váleček“ Kofránek

== Production ==
The series was the first original children's television series of the Czechoslovak Television of the present day, which followed on from the adapted Mystery of the Puzzle. The first six-part season was written jointly by Jarmila Turnovská and Vlasta Janečková, and the second, seven-part series by Janečková herself. She also directed the entire series. To the main children's roles of characters who should have been around 11 years old, she chose Lenka Pletková, Michal Michálek and Antonín Navrátil. The fourth in the party, Váleček with a stronger figure, was portrayed by Marek Eben, who was equipped with a special vest under his shirt during filming, which visually added kilograms. Filming of the first series took place in Prague in 1969 and 1970.

In the second season, Michal Michálek did not reprise the role of Ferda, as he has grown and changed considerably over the years, so Janečková and Turnovská removed him from the series. The main group of children thus remained three members. The second series was filmed in 1973.

The music for the series was composed by Jaromír Vomáčka. Company Krátký film Praha produced the series for Czechoslovak Television.

== Broadcast ==
Czechoslovak Television broadcast the series on the I. program in the years 1971–1975. The series' first season aired from October to November 1971, with the first episode premiering on 10 October 1971. Other episodes followed in an irregular weekly period (it was shown on Saturdays or Sundays), so the final part was broadcast on November 14, 1971. The series was included in the early evening broadcast, the beginnings of individual episodes with a length of 21 to 28 minutes were at irregular times between 4:25 p.m. and 6:20 p.m.

The second season was shown on the I. program after a repeat of the first series from December 1974 to January 1975, the first episode premiered on December 28, 1974. More episodes were broadcast in the following days, with the last being broadcast on January 3, 1975. The second season was broadcast in the morning, the beginnings of individual parts with a length of 23 to 33 minutes were between 9:00 a.m. and 9:45 a.m.

The entire series was released on DVD by Czech Television in 2011.

== Reception ==
In his 2009 publication Seriály od A do Z, Jiří Moc stated that the program became important because it was the first Czechoslovak series from the present that was intended for children. According to him, the authors of Friends found likable child actors, and the audience's response forced the creation of a second series. While the first series was devoted to small children's adventures, in its sequel, which was created four years later, the main characters had already grown up and were slowly starting to mature. Therefore, the second series was not "as immediate and admirable[s]", according to Moc, but retained the "poetics, humor and sincerity of the previous narrative".

== Related works ==
The screenwriter and dramaturg of the series, Jarmila Turnovská, wrote its literary adaptation for young readers, which, however, contains a significantly changed plot and new characters. The book was published in 1981 by the Albatros publishing house.
