= Veronika Arichteva =

Czech actress and presenter (born 1986)

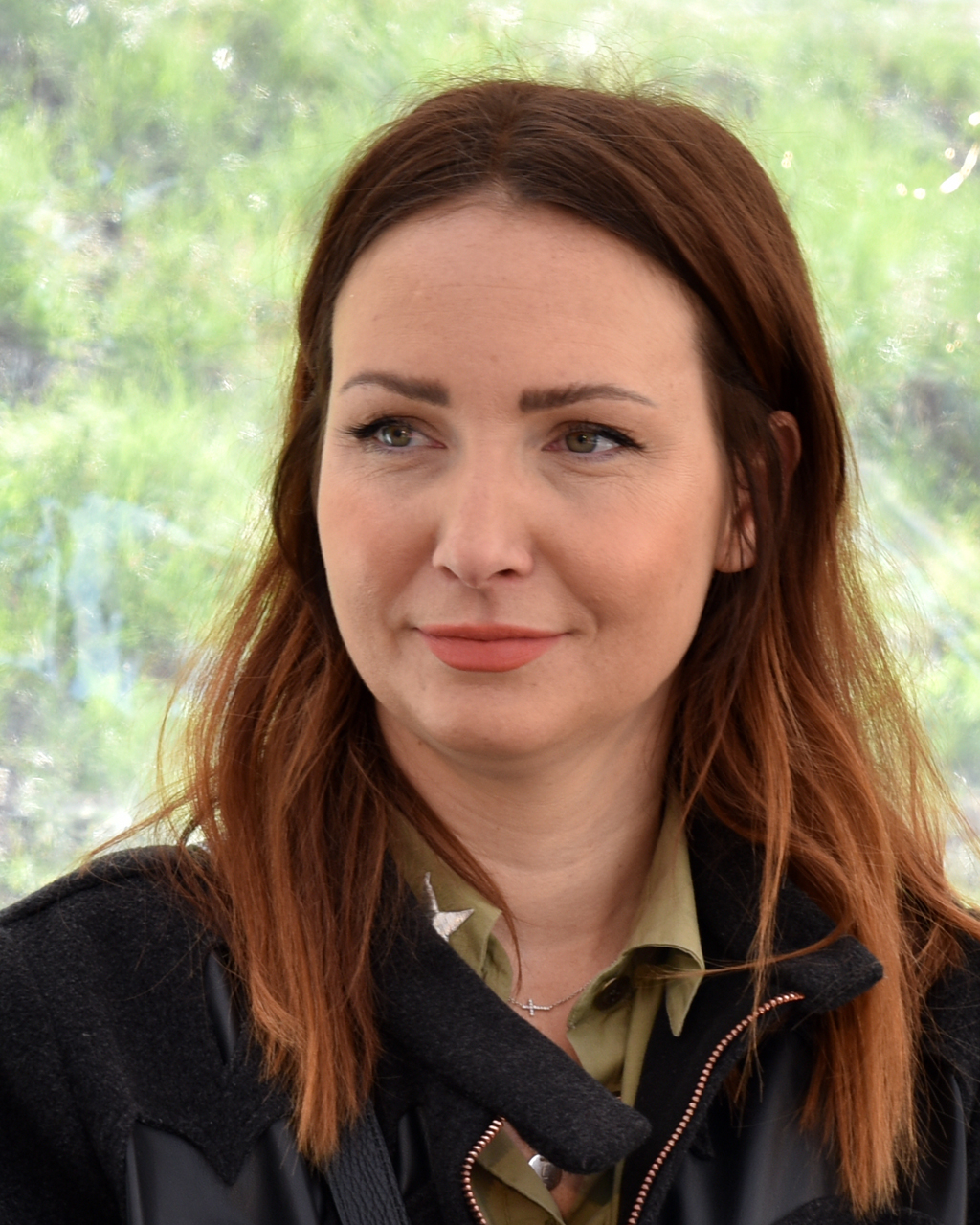
- Veronika Arichteva, 2023
- Born: Veronika Nová; 20 May 1986 (age 40); Prague, Czechoslovakia
- Occupations: Actress, presenter
- Years active: 1990–present
- Spouse: Biser Atanasov Arichtev (m. 2013)
- Children: 1

Veronika Arichteva, née Nová (born 20 May 1986 in Prague) is a Czech actress and presenter.

== Selected filmography ==
=== Films ===
- Dům na samotě (2022)
- Habermann (2010)
- Setkání v Praze (2006)
- Jezerní královna (1998)

=== TV series ===
- Slunečná (2020)
- Spravedlnost (2017)
- Policie Modrava (2015)
- The First Republic (2014 - 2018)
- Vyprávěj (2012 - 2013)
- Ordinace v růžové zahradě (2005 - 2008)
- Hop nebo trop (2004 - 2008)
