= Bronislav Poloczek =

Polish-Czech actor (1939–2012)

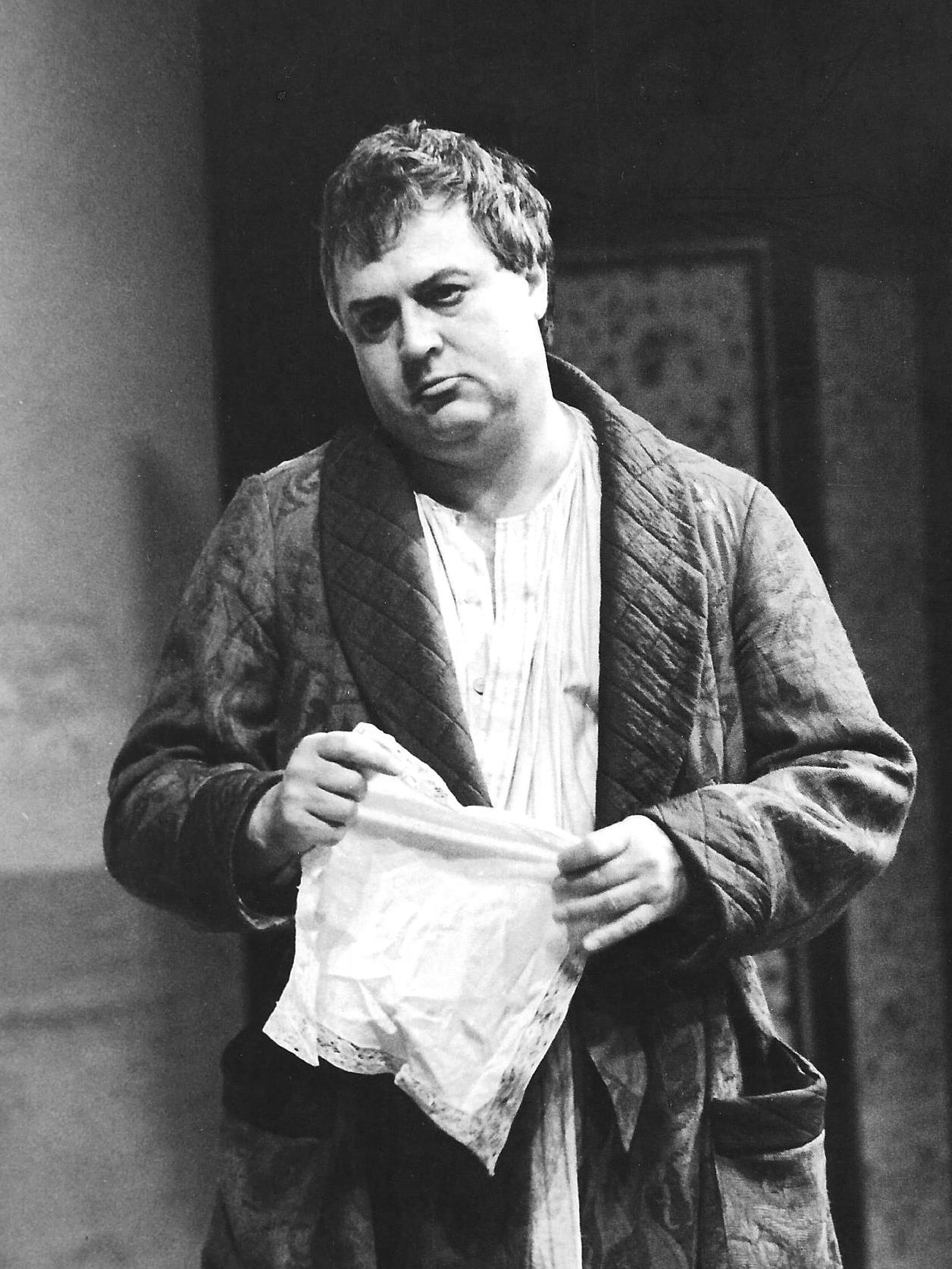
- Born: 7 August 1939; Sucha Górna, Poland (present-day Czech Republic)
- Died: 16 March 2012 (aged 72); Prague, Czech Republic
- Resting place: Olšany Cemetery
- Education: Juliusz Słowacki Polish Grammar School; Janáček Academy of Music and Performing Arts
- Occupation: Actor
- Years active: 1956–2012
- Notable work: Černí baroni Hospoda; Ulice; Synové a dcery Jakuba skláře
- Spouse: Zdenka

Bronislav Poloczek (Polish: Bronisław Poloczek; 7 August 1939 – 16 March 2012) was a Polish-Czech theatre and television actor.

Poloczek was born in Horní Suchá (Sucha Górna). He was best known for his appearances with the Prague National Theatre. He also appeared in various Czech television series, including Ulice and Hospoda; and many films, including Černí baroni and Spring of Life.

== Personal life ==
In 1956, Poloczek graduated from the Juliusz Słowacki Polish Grammar School. He was married to Zdenka. The couple had a son, Bronislav. His wife died in 1995. Poloczek died on 16 March 2012, aged 72, and was interred at the Olšany Cemetery in Prague.

Poloczek was a member of the Polish minority in the Czech Republic, and often discussed his affinity to Poland
