= Lovec (TV series) =

2024 Czech crime television series

- Genre: Crime; Mystery; Thriller
- Written by: Tomáš Koňařík; Adam Doležal
- Directed by: Jiří Strach
- Starring: Pavel Kříž; Jana Kolesárová
- Countries of origin: Czech Republic; Slovakia
- Original languages: Czech; Slovak
- No. of seasons: 1
- No. of episodes: 8

Production
- Cinematography: Martin Šec
- Running time: 60 minutes
- Production company: Trigon Production

Original release
- Network: Czech Television; TV JOJ
- Release: 27 October 2024 – present

Lovec (Hunter) is a crime mystery television series coproduced by Czech Television and TV JOJ. It is directed by Jiří Strach. The series is considered spiritual successor of Strach's previous projects Ďáblova lest, Ztracená brána and Labyrint.

== Plot ==
The series follows Tomáš, a demon hunter working for a secret order. He does order's will and believes that he is on the right side, although he has doubts about some of the habits and methods of his organization. During his work he helps police to investigate mysterious cases associated with mysterious and inexplicable phenomena and fights demons as he tries to maintain the balance between good and evil.

Alice is a manager at insurance company. She starts having dreams when a murder occurs at Tribeč Mountains and doesn't know if her dreams are just dreams or visions. The murder is similar to murder of her mother that happened thirty years ago and her father was convicted for it. For years she blamed him for what he supposedly did. However, her father denies the guilt and cannot explain what happened in front of his eyes at that time. At the crime scene she unexpectedly meets Tomáš and soon afterwards she gets in contact with a demon who enters inside her but she doesn't become possessed by him which never happened before. Tomáš believes that this is a new chance and that Alice can become a new weapon in an unequal battle. Therefore, he decides to protect her even from the very organisation of which he is a member and invites her to join him in his work.

== Cast ==
=== Main ===
- Pavel Kříž as Tomáš Lang
- Jana Kolesárová as Alice Černá
- Jiří Dvořák as Jindřich
- Ján Greššo as Gál
- Marek Lambora as Milan
- Ivo Gogál as Bruno
- Martin Stránský as Darius

=== Supporting ===
- Dušan Kaprálik as Priest
- Simonetta Hladká
- Leona König
- Veronika Strapková
- Max Bolf
- Tomáš Turek
- Nikolett Dékány
- Lukáš Černoch

== Episodes ==
Episode	Czech Title	Slovak Title	Directed by	Written by	Original air date (TV JOJ)	Original air date (ČT1)	Slovak viewers (millions)	Czech viewers (millions)
1	Alice	Alica	Jiří Strach	Tomáš Koňařík	27 October 2024	30 October 2024	0.263	0.825
2	Výtah	Výťah	Jiří Strach	Tomáš Koňařík	3 November 2024	6 November 2024		0.755
3	Talisman	Talizman	Jiří Strach	Tomáš Koňařík	10 November 2024	13 November 2024		0.658
4	Gama	Gama	Jiří Strach	Tomáš Koňařík	17 November 2024	20 November 2024		
5	Blíženci	Blíženci	Jiří Strach	Tomáš Koňařík	24 November 2024	27 November 2024		
6	Řád	Rád	Jiří Strach	Tomáš Koňařík	1 December 2024	4 December 2024		
7	Darius	Darius	Jiří Strach	Tomáš Koňařík	8 December 2024	11 December 2024		
8	Lov	Lov	Jiří Strach	Tomáš Koňařík	15 December 2024	18 December 2024		

== Production ==
Shooting started in October 2022. The series was shot in Prague, Chotěšov Abbey, Znojmo or various places in Slovakia. Filming locations also included Rajhrad Abbey. Shooting concluded at the end of July 2023.
