= Holiday in the Protectorate =

2015 Czech historical reality show

Holiday in the Protectorate (Czech: Dovolená v protektorátu) was a 2015 historical reality TV show created by Czech Television, the public television broadcaster in the Czech Republic, which first aired on 23 May 2015. The title of the show refers to the Protectorate of Bohemia and Moravia, the state established in the Czech lands following the Nazi occupation of Czechoslovakia in 1939, at the beginning of World War II. The plot of the show centered on a family placed in a cottage isolated in the middle of the forest under imaginary conditions of the restored protectorate. During their two-month stay in the cottage, the family had to face difficult conditions reminiscent of real wartime atmosphere. They were threatened by attacks of Gestapo and are allowed only limited communication with outside world. Nazi soldiers and other characters in the show were played by hired actors. The show was criticized for its alleged trivialization of the suffering real wartime survivors.

== Background ==
The show was conceived by documentary maker Zora Cejnkova, inspired by Channel 4's The 1940s House, Philip Zimbardo's 1970s Stanford prison experiment and the BBC's The Experiment. Czech psychologist Slavomil Hubalek was consulted about the project, and he said that if they could find a family that was empathetic and communicated well with each other, the project could work if they were well isolated from the outside world. Cejnkova described the format as "Situation Drama" to distinguish it from reality shows such as Big Brother. The actors were required to improvise to keep the situations going, much in the way that Milgram used an actor in his 'torture' experiments in 1963. Czech historians Jan Boris Uhlir and Marie Michlova were consulted to check the accuracy of historical aspects of the series.

== The series ==
The series aimed to illustrate how life was for ordinary Czechs during the occupation. The family was chosen according to a "rigorous audition process", from over 600 interested in participating, and the eight episodes were filmed during summer 2014. There was no competition element to the show, but this element was suggested for the purposes of the main sponsor. The family was paid 1 million crowns as motivation and compensation for lost salaries. An isolated farmhouse in the Beskydy Mountains was redecorated in period style, with some technical equipment, such as electrical lighting, installed on safety grounds. After a period of settling in and acclimatising to the low rations and other laws of the protectorate, the radio gave information on the developing critical situation regarding Nazi Germany. The course of the war in Europe was compressed into eight weeks, with a new challenge each week. Situations were created by actors such as the seller (who also brought news and some black market goods), representing the full scale of characters during the war, including collaborators, resistance fighters, German soldiers and the Gestapo. The situations were written into a coherent story.

== Reception ==
Despite a negative reaction from the Czech media, viewing figures were moderate; the first episode was viewed by around 500,000, and there were over 1 million downloads from the web page. The show was particularly popular with teenagers. The programme was chosen by the Eurovision Creative Forum Berlin 2015 as one of the 22 most innovative programmes from European Broadcasting Union member countries in 2015 and was awarded 2nd place. Several foreign broadcasters expressed interest in licensing the format.

== Media response ==
Before the show was broadcast, it received international attention due to criticism in the Czech Republic, over its alleged trivialization of the suffering of real wartime survivors, including the title of the show describing the Protectorate as a "holiday". In response, Cejnkova stated that the program's creators were approaching the topic "with utter seriousness", had intended to open a discussion, and were "aware that it is controversial to return to so turbulent a period", adding that they believed "that it is correct to attempt to do this, providing that certain ethical rules and historical reality are observed."

After the first episode was broadcast, the show received more favourable treatment in the press, from outlets including the Austrian broadcaster ORF, German TV channels ZDF and ARD, Süddeutsche Zeitung, Associated Press, Reuters and Prager Zeitung. The New York Times also reported on the show and its critics. The Hollywood Reporter reported both the criticism of the show and an interview with Cejnkova's response. However, criticism from some historians and commentators continued, with Mikuláš Kroupa of Post Bellum saying that the show had "nothing to do with history or telling the stories of that time" and was "just a game".

Critics in the Czech press expressed disbelief that people could enter an artificial world and enter the situation as 'real', and remained very critical. Other commentators criticised the critical response itself.
