= Osada (TV series) =

Czech comedy television series

- Genre: Comedy
- Written by: Petr Kolečko; Radek Bajgar; Martin Šimíček
- Directed by: Radek Bajgar; Jan Bártek
- Starring: Martin Myšička; Pavla Beretová; Radek Holub; Petra Nesvačilová
- Country of origin: Czech Republic
- Original language: Czech
- No. of seasons: 2
- No. of episodes: 23

Production
- Producers: Josef Viewegh; Petr Erben
- Cinematography: Lukáš Hyksa
- Running time: 60 minutes

Original release
- Network: ČT1
- Release: September 3, 2021

Osada is a Czech comedy television series produced by Czech Television. It is directed by Radek Bajgar and Jan Bártek and written by Petr Kolečko. It is about the relationships between people in the cottage area of Záhoří. Filming took place from May to October 2020 in Nižbor near Beroun where filmmakers built a fictitious cottage settlement.

The series starred Martin Myšička, Ivana Chýlková, Pavla Beretová, Radek Holub, Josef Polášek, Jana Plodková, Eva Leinweberová, Pavel Nový, Jana Švandová, Petra Nesvačilová, Filip František Červenka, Šárka Vaculíková, Karolína Lea Nováková, Igor Bareš and Stanislav Majer. The series' title song, titled „Má chata, můj hrad“ (My Cottage, My Castle), was composed and sung by Xindl X.

The series premiered on September 3, 2021 on the first channel of Czech Television; in November 2021 it was announced that the series would get a season 2, which will premiere in 2023.

== Cast ==
- Martin Myšička as David Srovnal
- Pavla Beretová as Ivana Srovnalová
- Radek Holub as Milan Rubal
- Petra Nesvačilová as Helena Rubalová
- Igor Bareš as Petr Južan
- Eva Leinweberová as Radka Južanová
- Filip František Červenka as Hynek Južan
- Josef Polášek as Šimon Kraus
- Jana Plodková as Dagmar Krausová
- Karolína Lea Nováková as Arnoštka Krausová
- Pavel Nový as Zdeněk Stýblo
- Jana Švandová as Marie Stýblová
- Ivana Chýlková as Lucie Rybáková
- Šárka Vaculíková as Jana Rybáková
- Stanislav Majer as Michal Franěk
- Tomáš Hanák as Tony Keyhoss
- Sára Lutovská as Terka
- Jaromír Dulava as Adolf Gensdorf
- Lucie Pernetová as Monika Gensdorfová
- Sebastian Pöthe as Tobiáš Gensdorf
- Kristína Svarinská (since season 2)
- Ondřej Malý (since season 2)
- Marek Daniel as František Kocián (since season 2)
- Ivana Uhlířová as Kociánová (since season 2)
- Tomáš Dalecký as Kocián (since season 2)
- Karolína Knězů as Kociánová (since season 2)

== Episodes ==
=== Season 1 ===
No.	Title	Directed by	Original release date	Czech viewers (millions)
1	"1"	Radek Bajgar	September 3, 2021	1.439
2	"2"	Radek Bajgar	September 10, 2021	1.085
3	"3"	Radek Bajgar	September 17, 2021	1.058
4	"4"	Radek Bajgar	September 24, 2021	0.976
5	"5"	Radek Bajgar	October 1, 2021	0.966
6	"6"	Radek Bajgar	October 8, 2021	0.866
7	"7"	Radek Bajgar	October 15, 2021	0.937
8	"8"	Radek Bajgar	October 22, 2021	0.928
9	"9"	Jan Bártek	October 29, 2021	0.885
10	"10"	Jan Bártek	November 5, 2021	0.952
11	"11"	Jan Bártek	November 12, 2021	1.030
12	"12"	Jan Bártek	November 19, 2021	0.985
13	"13"	Radek Bajgar	November 26, 2021	0.986

=== Season 2 ===
No.	Title	Directed by	Original release date	Czech viewers (millions)
1	"1"	Radek Bajgar	September 1, 2023	0.946
2	"2"	Radek Bajgar	September 8, 2023	0.809
3	"3"	Unknown	September 15, 2023	0.882
4	"4"	Unknown	September 22, 2023	0.936
5	"5"	Unknown	September 29, 2023	0.872
6	"6"	Unknown	October 6, 2023	0.851
7	"7"	Unknown	October 13, 2023	0.842
8	"8"	Unknown	October 20, 2023	0.871
9	"9"	Unknown	October 27, 2023	0.871
10	"10"	Unknown	November 3, 2023	0.896
