= Rozsudek =

- Genre: Action, crime
- Written by: Oldřich Železný
- Directed by: Otto Haas
- Starring: Václav Voska
- Country of origin: Czechoslovakia
- Original language: Czech
- No. of seasons: 1
- No. of episodes: 6

Production
- Running time: 39–47 minutes

Original release
- Network: Czechoslovak Television
- Release: February 16 – March 23, 1971

Rozsudek (Judgement) is a 1971 Czechoslovak action crime drama television series produced by Czechoslovak Television. The six-part series was directed by Otto Haas and written by Oldřich Železný.

== Plot ==
At the end of the World War II in 1945, an unknown wounded man in a Nazi uniform is found in a German military convoy retreating from Czechoslovakia. After recovering from his physical injuries, he was placed in a sanatorium in Vienna, where he stayed for the next two decades, as he also suffered memory loss and had no idea who he was. Neurosurgeon Nowak performs an experimental medical procedure on him, which is successful: the man remembers that his name is Jakub Rahn, and he begins to recall other memories from his life and from the shock he suffered, which caused him to lose his memory. He escapes from the kidnappers, who are trying to hide him on the other side of the world, and goes back to Czechoslovakia, because he is convinced that it is his duty to fulfill the tasks he was given at the end of the war as a partisan and intelligence officer.

== Cast ==
- Václav Voska as Jakub Rahn / Erich / Gerhard Wagner, former partisan and intelligence officer
- Bohuš Záhorský as Albert Hönig, Vienna manufacturer
- Jiřina Petrovická as Agatha, sister of Albert Hönig
- Felix le Breux as doktor Nowak, Vienna neurosurgeon
- Vladimír Šmeral as doktor Becher, Vienna neurosurgeon
- Jiří Holý as Richard Ohnesorg / Brenner, contractor and dirty work man
- Martin Růžek as rada Weingarten, Vienna police commander
- Vladimír Ráž as komisař Eberhardt, Vienna policeman
- Jan Schánilec as doktor Kurt Henke, Vienna medician
- Otakar Brousek as plukovník Veleba, Prague police commander
- Petr Kostka as kapitán Zeman, Prague policeman
- Zdeněk Kryzánek as Josef Homolka, former partisan
- Vladimír Stach as Hugo Strnad, former partisan
- Jorga Kotrbová as Marie Zábranská, daughter of Rahn's girlfriend
- Gustav Nezval as colonel Jiří Beneš, intelligence officer and Rahn's friend
- Bohumil Šmída as generál, commander of Czechoslovak counterintelligence
- Ladislav Pešek as colonel Rejsek, retired intelligence officer, Rahn's former commander

== Production ==
The authors of the plot of Rozsudek, the first Czechoslovak television series of an adventurous nature and an attempt for the widest audience, are Jaroslav Šikl and Josef Šilhavý, the screenplay was written by Oldřich Železný. Director Otto Haas chose Václav Voska for the main role of Jakub Rahn. The music was composed by Luboš Fišer and recorded by the Film Symphony Orchestra under the direction of Štěpán Koníček. He produced the series Krátký film Praha for Czechoslovak Television.

Filming took place in 1970, in July of that year the filmmakers shot in southern Bohemia, specifically at the border crossing in České Velenice. Exteriors in Suchdol nad Lužnicí and Třebon were also planned. The show was supposed to air in December 1970. In November 1970, finishing work was underway on the series.

Simultaneously with the series, in 1971 the Magnet publishing house published a novel adaptation of the story by Jaroslav Šiklo entitled Já, Jakub Rahn (I, Jakub Rahn).

== Broadcast ==
The series Ruzsudek was broadcast by Czechoslovak Television on second channel during February and March 1971. The first episode premiered on 16 February 1971, more followed in a weekly period, so that the final sixth episode was broadcast on 23 March 1971.

== Reception ==
In his publication Seriály od A do Z: lexikon českých seriálů, Jiří Moc stated in 2009 that the series Rozsudek was already a bit "papery" in his time, but despite the ideological subtext, which was not very visible to the audience, the show's creators used "dramatic moments to create suspenseful detective stories".
