= O mě se neboj =

- Genre: Romantic Comedy
- Directed by: Biser Arichtev
- Starring: Veronika Arichteva; Václav Matějovský
- Country of origin: Czech Republic
- Original language: Czech
- No. of seasons: 1
- No. of episodes: 8

Production
- Producers: Filip Bobiňsk; Jan Coufal
- Running time: 50–60 minutes

Original release
- Network: TV Nova
- Release: 3 November 2022

O mě se neboj is a Czech romantic comedy series from 2022 by showrunners and producers Filip Bobiňski and Jan Coufal, directed by Biser A. Arichtev. The series was created and produced by the production company Dramedy Productions. The screenplay is based on the Polish series O mnie się nie martw and was written by Hana Roguljič and Magdalena Wdowyczynová, under the supervision of Jan Coufal.

On 25 December 2022, TV Nova announced that it was considering a second series.

== Cast ==
- Veronika Arichteva as Eva Málková
- Václav Matějovský as JUDr. Martin Kalina, Eva's lawyer
- Lukáš Příkazký as Kryštof Málek, Eva's husband
- Naďa Konvalinková as Miluše Málková, Kryštof's mother
- Veronika Lapková as JUDr. Petra Altmannová
- Michal Kocourek as JUDr. Jiří Altmann, Petra's father
- Adéla Dobešová as Helena Málková, Eva's and Kryštof's daughter
- Veronika Dobešová as Viktorie Málková, Eva's and Kryštof's daughter
- Patricie Pagáčová as Tereza Tmějová, Eva's friend
- Roman Vojtek as Pavel Režný, Eva's lover
- Martin Sobotka as Karel Sládek, Eva's and Kryštof's neighbour
- Vojtěch Vodochodský as Tomáš Němec, Martin's friend
- Josef Hervert as JUDr. Jan Janata, Kryštof's lawyer

== Plot ==
The protagonist of the series is Eva, a divorcing mother of two children, whose life is one big chaos. She speaks her mind at all times, which gets her into a lot of trouble. She gets fired from her current call center job and in addition she still lives with her unreliable husband Kryštof. The fact that she loses the first divorce trial because her lawyer doesn't show up at all is taken as a sign that they should stay together by her husband. Eva finds a job as a receptionist at a law firm where she meets lawyer Martin who eventually finds sympathy for Eva. Martin's partner and fellow lawyer Petra doesn't like at all.

== Episodes ==
Episode	Directed by	Written by	Original air date (Voyo)	Original air date (Nova)	Czech viewers (millions)
1	Biser A. Arichtev	Hana Roguljič, Magdalena Wdowyczynová	3 November 2022	10 November 2022	0.760
2	Biser A. Arichtev	Hana Roguljič, Magdalena Wdowyczynová	3 November 2022	10 November 2022	0.662
3	Biser A. Arichtev	Hana Roguljič, Magdalena Wdowyczynová	10 November 2022	17 November 2022	0.636
4	Biser A. Arichtev	Hana Roguljič, Magdalena Wdowyczynová	17 November 2022	24 November 2022	0.634
5	Biser A. Arichtev	Hana Roguljič, Magdalena Wdowyczynová	24 November 2022	1 December 2022	0.650
6	Biser A. Arichtev	Hana Roguljič, Magdalena Wdowyczynová	1 December 2022	8 December 2022	0.647
7	Biser A. Arichtev	Hana Roguljič, Magdalena Wdowyczynová	8 December 2022	15 December 2022	0.606
8	Biser A. Arichtev	Hana Roguljič, Magdalena Wdowyczynová	15 December 2022	22 December 2022	0.606
