= Ultimátum =

- Genre: Action, Crime
- Written by: Juraj Raýman; Michal Kollár; Zuzana Križková
- Directed by: Michal Kollár
- Starring: Ján Koleník
- Countries of origin: Slovakia; Czech Republic
- Original language: Slovak
- No. of seasons: 1
- No. of episodes: 8

Production
- Running time: 55 minutes

Original release
- Network: TV JOJ; ČT1
- Release: March 26 – May 7, 2022

Ultimátum (English: Ultimatum) is a Slovak-Czech action crime television series. It starred Ján Koleník. The series was filmed for TV JOJ in co-production with Czech Television.

== Plot ==
Police negotiator Dano Andrik becomes involved in a political-negotiating crisis that takes place in the cardiac surgery department of a hospital where, in addition to the minister, Andrik's pregnant wife, Lenka Naušová, is also present.

In order for Dano, together with other patients, to get her to safety, he is forced to face the demands of the kidnapper Korňan. Dano must decide: either to follow orders from the highest places or to clear the name of the kidnapper.

== Cast and characters ==
- Ján Koleník as por. Daniel Andrik, police negotiator
- Milan Bahúl as mjr. Pavel Korňan, kidnapper, former soldier and criminal
- Ester Geislerová as Lenka Naušová, Andrik's wife
- Matyáš Valenta as Šimon Andrik, Andrik's son
- Alena Mihulová as Hana Naušová, mother of Lenka Naušová
- Svätopluk Malachovský as Andrej Podhradský, Slovak Minister of Defence
- Pavel Šimun as Miloš Podhradský, son of Andrej Podhradský
- Natália Germáni as Kristýna Podhradská, Podhradský's wife
- Anna Šišková as Zdena Podhradská, Podhradský's ex-wife
- Jakub Gogál as Peter Křížek, Podhradský's bodyguard
- Ján Slezák as Filip Rajman, Podhradský's bodyguard
- Miroslav Etzler as Jiří Málek, Czech Minister of Interior
- Ján Jackuliak as Viktor Kubec, Slovak Minister of Health
- Diana Mórová as Simona Ruprichová
- Marko Igonda as Tibor Zemánek
- Peter Kočíš as Juraj Kysucký, Slovak Prime Minister
- Ivan Krúpa as kpt. Jozef Brázda, Chief of Police
- Kamil Mikulčík as npor. Milan Štrba, investigator
- Michaela Majerníková as ppor. Darina Bieliková, investigator
- Dušan Cinkota as MUDr. Jozef Sláma, Chief of Cardiology
- Edita Borsová as MUDr. Táňa Slámová, Jozef Sláma's wife
- Martin Nahálka as MUDr. Samuel Braun, Táňa Slámová's lover
- Ľubomír Bukový as Zoltán Žilinčík
- Róbert Jakab as Alois Kubiš, recidivist
- Dominika Morávková as Eva Kubišová, Alois Kubiš's wife
- Artur Haverda as Ján Kubiš, Alois Kubiš's son
- Anastasia Kohutová as Dagmar Kubišová, Alois Kubiš's daughter
- Alena Pajtinková as Viktória Glasáková, journalist

== Episodes ==
No.	Title	Directed by	Written by	Original release date	Czech viewers (millions)	Slovak viewers (millions)
1	"Episode 1"	Michal Kollár	Michal Kollár	26 March 2022	N/A	TBA
2	"Episode 2"	Michal Kollár	Michal Kollár	2 April 2022	N/A	TBA
3	"Episode 3"	Michal Kollár	Michal Kollár	9 April 2022	N/A	TBA
4	"Episode 4"	Michal Kollár	Michal Kollár	16 April 2022	N/A	TBA
5	"Episode 5"	Michal Kollár	Michal Kollár	23 April 2022	N/A	TBA
6	"Episode 6"	Michal Kollár	Michal Kollár	30 April 2022	N/A	TBA
7	"Episode 7"	Michal Kollár	Michal Kollár	7 May 2022	N/A	TBA
8	"Episode 8"	Michal Kollár	Michal Kollár	7 May 2022	N/A	TBA
