= Guru (miniseries) =

- Genre: Drama
- Starring: Anna Fialová, Vojtěch Kotek
- Country of origin: Czech Republic
- Original language: Czech
- No. of seasons: 1
- No. of episodes: 3

Production
- Running time: 45 minutes

Original release
- Network: Voyo
- Release: January 14 – January 28, 2022

Guru is a 2022 three-part drama television series developed and produced by Dramedy Productions. The authors of the project Jan Coufal, Filip Bobiňski and Petr Šizling entrusted Jan Coufal's script to director Biser Arichtev. The series was filmed under the Voyo Original brand and published on the Voyo platform. After the series The Roubal Case, it is the second series filmed under the banner Voyo Original.

The series was inspired by real events, especially the character of Jaroslav Dobeš (known as Guru Jara), who practiced the so-called "unhooking" method and raped his female clients. Anna Fialová, Vojtěch Kotek, Zuzana Stivínová, Kristýna Podzimková, Lukáš Melník and Martin Myšička appeared in main roles.

The first episode was published on Voyo on 14 January 2022. The last part was released on 28 January 2022.

== Cast ==
- Anna Fialová as Alice Balvínová
- Vojtěch Kotek as guru Marek Jaroš
- Zuzana Stivínová as major Mgr. Petra Malá, vyšetřovatelka
- Kristýna Podzimková as Klára Plíšková, Markova spolupracovnice
- Lukáš Melník as Radek, bývalý partner Alice
- Martin Myšička as státní zástupce Pavel Vágner
- Alžběta Malá as Kamila, studentka
- Lucie Štěpánková as Magda, Kamilina matka
- Vasil Fridrich as Milan, Kamilin otec
- Denisa Barešová as Aneta, Alicina spolubydlící
- Martina Czyžová as Alicina spolubydlící
- Jiří Roskot as Karel
- Adéla Petřeková as vyšetřovatelka
- Marek Pospíchal as vyšetřovatel
- Michal Isteník as nadpraporčík Mgr. Doležal
- Kryštof Bartoš as Dušan
- Elizaveta Maximová as Zuzana
- Jan Novotný as soudce
- Petr Meissel as Jiří

== Episodes ==
Episode	Written by	Original air date	Czech viewers (millions)
1	Jan Coufal	14 January 2022	
2	Jan Coufal	21 January 2022	
3	Jan Coufal	28 January 2022	
