= Hrdina (TV series) =

- Genre: Crime Comedy
- Written by: Václav Hašek
- Directed by: Jaroslav Fuit; Jan Haluza
- Starring: Jan Nedbal
- Country of origin: Czech Republic
- Original language: Czech
- No. of seasons: 2
- No. of episodes: 16

Production
- Running time: 55 minutes

Original release
- Network: Prima televize
- Release: October 23, 2024

Hrdina is a Czech television series that has been broadcast by Prima televize since 23 October 2024. The series is about a police lieutenant Adam Hrdina, who is brash and an unguided missile. A difficult cop to work with. Nevertheless, there are colleagues who try to find understanding for him.

The series was made as a replacement for Polda series that concluded in 2024 and is a made by the same team.

== Plot ==
Lieutenant Adam Hrdina is a cocky cop who is hard to work with. He has no problem getting into disciplinary proceedings and has a relatively informal work demeanor. If he has to, he will also commit burglary but tries to help people in need and puts himself in danger for them. Because of his informal procedures, there are repeated conflicts with his superior, Major Vladislav Říha. Hrdina must work with new public prosecutor Lucie Bartošová who cannot stand him at first, but she gradually finds understanding for him.

== Cast ==
- Jan Nedbal as por. Adam Hrdina, young experienced but brash and troubled cop
- Kristýna Boková as JUDr. Lucie Bartošová, public prosecutor who replaces Dr. Henrych who was Hrdina's friend
- Ondřej Malý as mjr. Bc. Vladislav Říha, head of the crime department
- Daniela Voráčková as MUDr. Anna Holá, analyst, technician and coroner
- Jan Hofmann as Hrdina's colleague
- Robin Ferro as Luky, Hrdina's friend
- Roman Slovák as Karlos, owner of Karlos bar

== Episodes ==
| Season | Episodes | Originally aired | | Average rating | |
| Season | Episodes | First aired | Last aired | Millions | Share |
|---|---|---|---|---|---|
| 1 | 8 | 23 October 2024 | 11 November 2024 | 715,000 | 21,53% |
| 2 | 8 | TBA | TBA | TBA | TBA |
