= Kauza Kramný =

- Genre: Crime, documentary
- Country of origin: Czech Republic
- Original language: Czech
- No. of seasons: 1
- No. of episodes: 5

Production
- Running time: 45 minutes

Original release
- Network: Voyo
- Release: 19 July 2024

Kauza Kramný is a 2024 Czech documentary series directed by Petr Hátle. It was produced by production company MasterFilm. Voyo's creative producer was documentarian Erika Hníková, MasterFilm producer Dagmar Sedláčková. The author of the script is Kristina Májová.

The series is devoted to the case of Petr Kramný, who was extremely covered in the media, convicted of murdering his wife and daughter during their joint family vacation in Egypt in 2013. The unprecedented interest of the media and the public at the time was accelerated by Petr Kramný's willingness to speak with journalists.

The documentary presents the narratives of relatives, close friends, lawyers, experts, experts and Petr Kramný himself, who, directly from serving his sentence, after ten years in the first interview, returns to the events of that time.

== Episodes ==
No.	Title	Directed by	Written by	Original release date
1	"Vysněná dovolená"	Petr Hátle	Kristina Májová	19 July 2024
2	"Truchlící manžel"	Petr Hátle	Kristina Májová	26 July 2024
3	"Válka znalců"	Petr Hátle	Kristina Májová	2 August 2024
4	"Za zavřenými dveřmi"	Petr Hátle	Kristina Májová	9 August 2024
5	"Tajemství pokoje"	Petr Hátle	Kristina Májová	16 August 2024
