= Záhadné případy =

- Genre: Mystery
- Directed by: Vratislav Šlajer; Štefan Titka; Andy Fehu
- Starring: Miroslav Donutil
- Country of origin: Czech Republic
- Original language: Czech
- No. of seasons: 1
- No. of episodes: 8

Production
- Running time: 60 minutes
- Production company: Bionaut

Original release
- Network: TV Nova
- Release: 27 October 2024 – present

Záhadné případy (Mysterious Cases) is a Czech mystery television series broadcast by TV Nova. The series is notable to star all acting members of Donutil family as it stars Miroslav Donutil along with his son Martin and daughter in law Sára Donutilová. Its working title was Za domem v lese.

== Plot ==
Widower Jaroslav Sezemský was among the top healers in the 1990s. Over time, he became more rational and started to expose himself less. He became bitter and somewhat eccentric after death of his wife. Relationship with his daughter Klára is not very good. He meets Petr, a fan of his. Together they solve cases of paranormal elements. Their clientele is recruited from those who have had supernatural circumstances enter their lives.

== Cast ==
- Miroslav Donutil as Jaroslav Sezemský
- Martin Donutil as Petr
- Sára Donutilová as Klára Sezemská
- Emma Smetana
- Štěpán Uhlíř
- Jana Vaculíková

== Episodes ==
Episode		Directed by	Written by	Original air date	Czech viewers (millions)
1	Dokud nás smrt nerozdělí	Lukáš Hanulák	Štefan Titka	27 October 2024	1.144
2	Nikdy nejsi sám	Lukáš Hanulák	Štefan Titka	3 November 2024	1.223
3	Neviditelná	Andy Fehu		10 November 2024	1.279
4	Onlinegeist			17 November 2024	1.134
5	V poli			24 November 2024	1.147
6	Propast			1 December 2024	
7	Zahraj to znovu			8 December 2024	
8	Za domem v lese			15 December 2024	
