= Vědma =

2023 Czech-Slovak fantasy television series

- Genre: Fantasy
- Written by: Adriana Kronerová
- Directed by: Jakub Kroner
- Starring: Josef Trojan, Annet Charitonova, Gabriela Marcinková, Antónia Lišková, Dagmar Havlová, Jaroslav Dušek, Ivan Franěk a další
- Countries of origin: Slovakia and Czech Republic
- Original languages: Czech and Slovak
- No. of seasons: 1
- No. of episodes: 5

Production
- Production locations: Czech Republic and Slovakia
- Cinematography: Veronika Donutková
- Running time: 48-60 Minutes

Original release
- Network: Voyo
- Release: June 16 – July 14, 2023

Vědma (Fortune teller) is a 2023 Czech-Slovak fantasy television series. It is the first fantasy series made for Voyo. It scheduled for broadcast on 16 June 2023 for Slovak and Czech audience. Story is inspired by Old Prague legends while being set in present.

Annet Charitonova, known in the music world as Annet X, for whom Vědma is her acting debut, Dagmar Havlová, Josef Trojan, Jaroslav Dušek, Antónia Lišková, Gabriela Marcinková, Ivan Franěk, Denis Šafařík, Vica Kerekes and others appear in the main roles of the miniseries.

Vědma is the author's work of Adriana Kronerová, who is a screenwriter, producer and author of the theme.

== Plot ==
Vědma is a fantasy miniseries, the story of which dates back to the period of Rudolfinum Prague, but the plot itself is set in the present. It is a story about the age-old battle between good and evil - light and darkness.

Filip, one of the many alchemists of the Rudolfinian era, is passionately devoted to experiments with the elixir of eternal life. Thanks to the existence of the mysterious Golem, he manages to become almost immortal, as well as his descendants Lucia and Tom. Together they travel through time, fueled only by evil and negative energy. They create this among humans by manipulating them using technologies that help them maintain their power and longevity. Their main goal is to get rid of the centuries-old curse of dependence on this energy and move to dimensions where they will no longer be bound to physical bodies.

However, to achieve this goal, he must find a transition portal that is guarded by a mysterious figure known as the Witch. She ranks among the beings of light that are not entirely of this world. They can move through time and space and thus exist in parallel worlds. The energy source they use is pure light, so they don't need any tools. Ordinary people also play an important role in the story. Even among them there are individuals who can perceive beings of light, thanks to the gift of expanded consciousness.

== Cast ==
- Antónia Lišková as Fortune teller
- Annet Charitonova as Klára
- Josef Trojan as Tom
- Dagmar Havlová as Bára
- Jaroslav Dušek as Ondřej
- Gabriela Marcinková as Lucia
- Denis Šafařík as Adam
- Ivan Franěk as Filip

== Episodes ==
No.	Title	Directed by	Written by	Original release date	Czech viewers (millions)
1	TBA	Jakub Kroner	Adriana Kronerová	June 16, 2023	N/A
2	TBA	Jakub Kroner	Adriana Kronerová	June 23, 2023	N/A
3	TBA	Jakub Kroner	Adriana Kronerová	June 30, 2023	N/A
4	TBA	Jakub Kroner	Adriana Kronerová	July 7, 2023	N/A
5	TBA	Jakub Kroner	Adriana Kronerová	July 14, 2023	N/A
