= Mordparta =

- Genre: Crime
- Written by: Tomáš Bombík
- Directed by: Peter Bebjak; Róbert Šveda
- Starring: Jiří Bartoška; Vojtěch Kotek; Markéta Plánková; Pavel Batěk; Jiří Bábek
- Country of origin: Czech Republic
- Original language: Czech
- No. of seasons: 2
- No. of episodes: 16

Production
- Running time: 60 minutes

Original release
- Network: Prima televize
- Release: August 28, 2016 – May 28, 2017

Mordparta is a Czech crime television series that was broadcast by Prima televize from 2016 to 2017. It takes place at a regional town general crime police department of the . It was directed by Peter Bebjak and Róbert Šveda while Tomáš Bombík wrote the script. Prima described Mordparta as a "Nordic type crime series".

The first season of the series has eight episodes and each of them solves one coherent story. Jiří Bartoška, Vojtěch Kotek, Markéta Plánková, Pavel Batěk and Jiří Bábek appeared in the main roles as members of the investigative team.

The second season started filming on 19 November 2017.

== Cast ==
- Jiří Bartoška as Jan Kolumný, nicknamed Columbo
- Vojtěch Kotek as Karel „Kája“ Plíhal
- Markéta Plánková as Naďa Vokušová
- Pavel Batěk as Pavel Paulus
- Jiří Bábek as Milan Doležal
- David Máj as Matouš Radačínský
