= Linka (miniseries) =

- Genre: Action, comedy, drama
- Directed by: Jiří Chlumský; Martin Kopp
- Starring: Ivana Chýlková; Ondřej Brzobohatý; Eva Leimbergerová
- Country of origin: Czech Republic
- Original language: Czech
- No. of seasons: 1
- No. of episodes: 4

Production
- Running time: 55 minutes

Original release
- Network: Prima televize
- Release: June 17 – June 26, 2019

Linka (Line) is a Czech television miniseries that aired in 2019. It was broadcast by Prima televize. Its plot focuses on the emergency line of all rescue services. Each episode follows cases inspired by real life events and cases. Ivana Chýlková as chief police dispatcher Commissioner Zuzana Radová and Ondřej Brzobohatý as young police officer Filip Mrkvička played the main roles. Filming took place from April to May 2019.

== Plot ==
Policeman Filip Mrkvička is transferred to emergency call center. His supervisor Zuzana Radová is not enthusiastic about him as he violates the rules of the call center of the emergency line eventhough he will demonstrate his skills in a very tricky case of a former policeman threatening his own family.

== Cast ==
- Ondřej Brzobohatý as Lieutenant Mgr. Filip Mrkvička, young policeman, commissioner
- Ivana Chýlková as Senior lieutenant Mgr. Zuzana Radová, chief police dispatcher, commissioner
- Martin Hofmann as MUDr. Theodor Franz, once a doctor at the emergency service, now the chief dispatcher in the ambulance, had to leave the ambulance because of alcohol, a doctor and paramedic by profession
- Eva Leimbergerová as Mgr. Jolana Motýlová, police psychologist
- Vladimír Kratina as Senior lieutenant Mgr. Karel Mazanec, head of the emergency line, firefighter by profession
- Martin Finger as Mgr. Richard „Richie“ Rada, firefighter, response commander
- Roman Vojtek as Captain Mgr. Mojmír Černík, police officer, chief commissioner
- Sandra Černodrinská as MUDr. Monika Kučerová, dispatcher and ambulance doctor
- Jana Sováková as Mgr. Karin Nohová, dispatcher at the fire department, firefighter
- Annette Nesvadbová as Mgr. Anežka Bílková, ambulance dispatcher, paramedic
- Matěj Šíma as Michal Hnilička, dispatcher at the fire department, firefighter
- Adam Vacula as MUDr. Daniel Motýl, Jolana's husband

== Episodes ==
| No. | Title | Directed by | Written by | Original release date | Czech viewers (millions) |
|---|---|---|---|---|---|
| 1 | "Episode 1" | Jiří Chlumský and Martin Kopp | Unknown | June 17, 2019 | 1.103 |
| 2 | "Episode 2" | Jiří Chlumský and Martin Kopp | Unknown | June 19, 2019 | 1.064 |
| 3 | "Episode 3" | Jiří Chlumský and Martin Kopp | Unknown | June 24, 2019 | 0.895 |
| 4 | "Episode 4" | Jiří Chlumský and Martin Kopp | Unknown | June 26, 2019 | 0.897 |
