= Půlnoční zpověď =

- Genre: Crime, Drama
- Written by: Kateřina Bártů, Jitka Bártů
- Directed by: Jitka Bártů
- Starring: Markéta Plánková, Marek Lambora
- Country of origin: Czech Republic
- Original language: Czech
- No. of seasons: 1
- No. of episodes: 8

Production
- Running time: 55-75 minutes

Original release
- Network: Prima televize
- Release: 2023

Related
- Poslední oběť

Půlnoční zpověď is a 2023 Czech television series broadcast by Prima televize. It starrs Markéta Plánková and Marek Lambora. It was produced as part of Prima Originals for streaming service Prima+.

== Plot ==
The series tells story of two siblings, Stela Skoumalová and Albert Skoumal. Stela Skoumalová is a psychologist and a relationship therapist. Her brother Albert Skoumal is a priest and scientist. Everything starts with death of Stela's client Marina Krausová. Before her death, Mariana brought Stela a branded handbag full of jewels. The case appears to be a suicide to the police at first but Stela in her statement intentionally conceals the existence of jewelry as she wants to find out who it really belongs to. During a difficult life situation, her estranged brother Albert becomes the only person she can still trust. However his behavior risks his professional reputation and a happy marriage.

== Cast ==
- Markéta Plánková as Stela Skoumalová
- Marek Lambora as Albert Skoumal
- Marek Taclík as Investigator
- Lukáš Příkazký as kpt. Vítězslav Vichr
- Jiří Dvořák as Skoumal
- Saša Rašilov as Olda
