= Záhada hlavolamu =

- Genre: Adventure
- Written by: Hynek Bočan; Václav Šašek
- Directed by: Hynek Bočan
- Starring: Jiří Lukeš, Tomáš Hádl, Martin Kapoun, Roman Skamene, Zdeněk Jánský
- Country of origin: Czechoslovakia
- Original language: Czech
- No. of seasons: 1
- No. of episodes: 9

Production
- Running time: 21–30 minutes

Original release
- Network: Czechoslovak Television
- Release: December 24, 1969 – January 1, 1970

Záhada hlavolamu (Mystery of the Puzzle) is a Czechoslovak adventure television series produced by Czechoslovak Television, which broadcast it in 1969–1970. The nine-part series is an adaptation of the novels The Mystery of the Puzzle and Stínadla se bouří by the writer Jaroslav Foglar. It was filmed by director Hynek Bočan, who is also the author of the script with Václav Šašek. The series focuses on a group of boys from the Rychlé šípy Club who venture into the mysterious urban district of Stínadla, where they uncover various local secrets.

Roles of older boys (Vonts) and adults were mostly played by well-known actors, while only Roman Skamene, who was fifteen at the time, continued to work in the acting profession from the representatives of the Rychlé šípy.

== Plot ==
A group of five honest and brave boys who call themselves the Rychlé šípy undertake all sorts of activities and quests for fun and adventure. Mirek Dušín, Jarka Metelka, Rychlonožka, Červenáček and Jindra Hojer learn one day about a mysterious puzzle - hedgehog in a cage, which is supposed to be of great value to the so-called Vont movement. They want to find out more about this item, so they start to go to the mysterious old quarter of Stínadla, where hostile Vonts live.

== Cast ==
=== Main ===
- Jiří Lukeš as Mirek Dušín
- Tomáš Hádl as Jarka Metelka
- Martin Kapoun as Rychlonožka
- Roman Skamene as Červenáček
- Zdeněk Jánský as Jindra Hojer

=== Supporting ===
- Jaromír Hanzlík as Jan Tleskač
- Jaroslav Moučka as father Mažňák / Em
- Václav Sloup as Mažňák
- Jan Tříska as Velký Vont / Široko
- Ivan Vyskočil as Otakar Losna
- Radoslav Brzobohatý as narrator

== Production ==
In the spring of 1967, the director Hynek Bočan came up with the idea to make a feature film based on the novels Záhada hlavolamu and Stínadla se bouří, who, after the approval of their author Jaroslav Foglar, started writing the script together with Václav Šašek. They offered it to the Barrandov Film Studio and the Gottwaldov Film Studio, but neither was interested in the project. On the contrary, it was shown by Czechoslovak Television, whose dramaturgs decided that it would be a seven-part series. Therefore, the authors edited the script in cooperation with dramaturg Josef Bouček. Part of the introduction of the first part were also some scenes that have their origins in the comics about the Rychlé šípy. For the roles of individual Fast Arrows, Bočan was looking for boys who would typically correspond to Jan Fischer's comic portrayal of these characters. Jiří Lukeš was eventually chosen from several hundred applicants for the role of Mirko Dušín, Tomáš Hádl was to portray Jarka Metelka, Roman Skamene won the role of Červenáček and Zdeněk Jánský was cast as Jindra Hojer. All four of them already had some experience with filming. The representative of the last missing role, Rychlonožka, was found in Martin Kapoun, for whom it was the first and only film work. Other characters were portrayed by actors Jaromír Hanzlík, Ivan Vyskočil and others.

In December 1968, a five-day training camp was held in the Krkonoše Mountains, which was intended for the representatives of Rychlé šípy to get to know each other. Filming of the series, produced by the Czechoslovak Television's Television Film Production, began in December 1968 and lasted until the beginning of summer 1969. It was filmed in the studios in Prague in Barrandov, where the decoration of the entire city quarter – Stínadel – was built. The crew also used studios in Prague's Hostivař and also some exteriors in Prague. During filming, it was decided in March 1969 that nine episodes would be produced instead of seven. The mystery of the puzzle became the first Czechoslovak television series intended for young people.

The music for the series was composed by Jiří Šust and recorded by the Film Symphony Orchestra under the direction of Štěpán Koníček.
