= Banáni =

- Genre: Comedy
- Written by: Tomáš Vávra; Vojtěch Moravec; Jiří Sádek; Jakub Roll; Radovan Snítil
- Directed by: Václav Moravec
- Starring: Cyril Dobrý; Sandra Nováková; Ondřej Malý
- Country of origin: Czech Republic
- Original language: Czech
- No. of seasons: 1
- No. of episodes: 8

Production
- Running time: 25-27 minutes
- Production companies: Old&Rich Production

Original release
- Network: Prima+
- Release: October 18 – November 22, 2023

Banáni (English: Bananas) is a 2023 Czech crime comedy television series. It is inspired by a real event when employees of Supermarket found Cocaine hidden in bananas. It started broadcast on 18 October 2023 on Prima+ streaming service.

== Plot ==
The series is set in a town near border with Germany. Jirka, a young storekeeper at local supermarket, discovers contraband of cocaine in bananas from Colombia. He decides to start selling the cocaine. He joins forces with warehouse manager Šárka and security guard Igor (Iggy). Initial attempts are unsuccessful, but trio eventually builds a functional model of drug distribution. The sell drugs directly at cash register of the store thanks to soft toys that serve as rewards from the market's loyalty event. Soon, problems start to appear.

== Cast ==
- Cyril Dobrý as Jirka
- Sandra Nováková as Šárka
- Ondřej Malý as Iggy
- Josef Carda as Ivan
- Naďa Konvalinková as Mařenka
- Petra Horváthová
- Marsell Bendig
- Leoš Noha

== Production ==
Shooting took place during February and March 2023. It was produced for FTV Prima streaming service Prima+ and scheduled for broadcast during Fall 2023. First episode was initially presented during Serial Killer Festival in September 2023 while the series itself started broadcast in October 2023, initially on Prima+ streaming service with plan to broadcast the series in television later.

== Reception ==
First episode was shown at Serial Killer Festival to positive reactions of audience.

== Episodes ==
| Episode | Title | Directed by | Written by | Original air date (Prima+) | Original air date (Prima) | Czech viewers (millions) |
|---|---|---|---|---|---|---|
| 1 | Nečekaný nález | Václav Moravec | Tomáš Vávra | 18 October 2023 | | |
| 2 | A co teď? | Václav Moravec | Tomáš Vávra | 18 October 2023 | | |
| 3 | Úspěchy a prohry | Václav Moravec | Tomáš Vávra | 25 October 2023 | | |
| 4 | Stará paní | Václav Moravec | Tomáš Vávra | 1 November 2023 | | |
| 5 | Byznys začíná | Václav Moravec | Tomáš Vávra | 8 November 2023 | | |
| 6 | Změna pravidel | Václav Moravec | Tomáš Vávra | 15 November 2023 | | |
| 7 | Opálený týpek | Václav Moravec | Tomáš Vávra | 22 November 2023 | | |
| 8 | Konce a začátky | Václav Moravec | Tomáš Vávra | 22 November 2023 | | |
