= Jitřní záře =

- Genre: Drama
- Directed by: Dan Wlodarczyk
- Starring: Petra Bučková, Jan Plouhar, Veronika Žilková, Lenka Vlasáková, Pavel Zedníček
- Country of origin: Czech Republic
- Original language: Czech
- No. of seasons: 1
- No. of episodes: 6

Production
- Running time: 50 minutes

Original release
- Network: Voyo
- Release: June 10 – July 15, 2022

Jitřní záře ( Morning Glow in English) is a 2022 Czech television series created under the Voyo Original brand. It was directed by Dan Wlodarczyk, who also co-wrote the screenplay with his wife Hana Wlodarczyk. It premiered on 10 June 2022. It is inspired by real events.

Petra Bučková, Jan Plouhar, Veronika Žilková, Lenka Vlasáková, Pavel Zedníček, Jana Janěková, Halka Třešňáková, Martin Sitta or Denisa Biskupová starred in the series.

== Plot ==
The story takes place at the beginning of the millennium in a small village in Šumava. Young couple Pavla Junková and Karel Balcar moves there as they wanted to leave the city and finally live on their own, conceive the longed-for child. However living together in a village with neighbors who have different values in life disrupts their dreams. Decision to give their daughter in an unconventional name starts a round of misunderstandings not only within the village, but also within the authorities and the state apparatus. Their eight-month-old daughter is taken from them while media enters the fight for her.

== Cast and characters ==
- Petra Bučková as Pavla Junková
- Jan Plouhar as Karel Balcar
- Jana Janěková as Jiřina Junková
- Pavel Zedníček as Miroslav Junek
- Veronika Žilková as Mgr. Bohuslava Šnajdrová
- Lenka Dolanská Vlasáková as Ilona
- Sofie Brejchová, Mia Bankó and Denisa Biskupová as Morning Glow/Jitřenka
- Pavel Nový as František Kubín
- Lenka Skopalová as Milena Kubínová
- Karel Zima as Láďa Kubín
- Martin Sitta as MayorRousek
- Halka Třešňáková as Fulínová
- Petra Špindlerová as Věra
- Kristýna Podzimková as Žaneta
