= Slunečná (TV series) =

Czech TV series

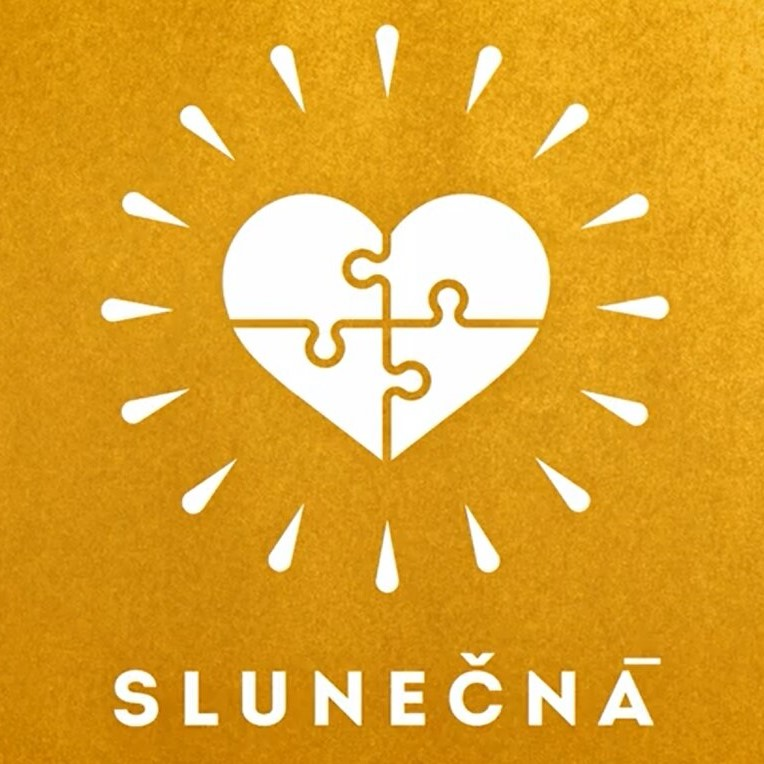
- Genre: Comedy
- Country of origin: Czech Republic
- Original language: Czech
- No. of seasons: 3
- No. of episodes: 160

Production
- Running time: 60 minutes

Original release
- Network: Prima televize
- Release: January 11, 2020 – February 22, 2022

Slunečná is a Czech comedy and relationship television series that premiered on January 11, 2020, on the Prima. The first episode called "Sázka" (Bet) was the most watched program of the day (1.28 million viewers over the age of 15) and surpassed the competing Czech TV program Peče celá země. 14 January 2020, it also beat the series Ordinace v růžové zahradě 2 (1.051 million viewers over 15). Filming of the series began in August 2019. Slunečná replaced the Krejzovi series in the broadcast. As of February 4, 2020, the sponsorship of the Sunny series is the most expensive of the Prima television programs. According to the available data, as of February 14, 2020, the series has the highest delayed viewership on computers and on TV. In Slovakia, JOJ TV broadcast the series from 25 August 2020 to 4 September 2020 under the name Slnečná. Only 4 episodes were broadcast due to low viewership. On October 22, 2021, Hungarian station ATV began broadcasting the series under the name Napfényes falunk, which can be loosely translated as "Our Sunny Village", with Hungarian dubbing.

== Cast ==
- Eva Burešová as Kristýna „Týna“ Alžběta Linhartová (née Popelková)
- Marek Lambora as Jan „Janek“ Linhart jr.
- Lukáš Langmajer as Vilém „Vilda“ Fiala
- Barbora Jánová as Sylvie „Sylva“ Fialová (née Popelková)
- Filip Tomsa as Roman Maxa
- Eva Holubová as Hana Schwartzmüllerová
