= Tátové na tahu =

- Genre: Comedy
- Written by: Richard Malatinský
- Directed by: Jiří Chlumský; Martin Kopp
- Starring: Štěpán Benoni; Karel Dobrý; Saša Rašilov; Petr Vaněk
- Country of origin: Czech Republic
- Original language: Czech
- No. of seasons: 1
- No. of episodes: 16

Production
- Running time: 55 minutes

Original release
- Network: Prima televize
- Release: September 9 – December 23, 2018

Tátové na tahu is a Czech comedy television series that was broadcast by Prima televize in 2018. In the main roles are four dads on maternity leave Jakub Beran, Lubor Knopp, Marek Moravec and Kamil Adámek. Prima Television started filming the series in May 2018.

== Cast ==
- Štěpán Benoni as Jakub Beran, former ice hockey player
- Karel Dobrý as Lubor Knopp, former businessman
- Saša Rašilov as Marek Moravec, used to work as a marketing and advertising assistant
- Petr Vaněk as Kamil Adámek, gay
- Eva Josefíková as Nikola Beranová
- Anna Geislerová as Mgr. Gábina Knoppová, nurse
- Jana Stryková as MUDr. Alena Moravcová, medician
- Jakub Prachař as Tomáš, gay and fire fighter
