= Táta v nesnázích =

- Genre: Comedy
- Directed by: Petr Zahrádka, Tomáš Pavlíček
- Starring: Martin Pechlát
- Country of origin: Czech Republic
- Original language: Czech
- No. of seasons: 1
- No. of episodes: 16

Production
- Running time: 50 minutes

Original release
- Network: TV Nova
- Release: September 2, 2023

Táta v nesnázích is a Czech family comedy TV series created by Paprika Studios for TV Nova. It premiered on 2 September 2023 on the Voyo platform and a week later on Nova channel.

== Synopsis ==
A sixteen-part family comedy series that tells the story of a divorced man in his fifties, Petr. He dedicated his life to raising three daughters (two adults and the third in her wildest teen years). When daughters become independent, Peter decides it's time for a change. With the motto "Fifty is the new thirty", he embarks on an adventure in search of new love. After years without dating, he returns to the world of dating. It brings a series of comical situations and emotional twists. To make matters worse, daughters return home one by one, turning the family home into a colorful merry-go-round; Petr thus finds himself in situations that even the best comedian would not want while trying to keep family together.

== Cast and characters ==
- Martin Pechlát as Petr Hora
- Agáta Kryštůfková as Viky Horová
- Jitka Schneiderová as Kateřina
- Štěpánka Fingerhutová as Laura Horová
- Veronika Divišová as Alex Horová
- Petra Hřebíčková as Dorka
- Bořek Slezáček as Roman
- Kryštof Bartoš as David
