= Einstein – Případy nesnesitelného génia =

Czech police drama

- Genre: Action Crime comedy
- Directed by: Vojtěch Moravec
- Starring: Vojtěch Kotek, Anna Polívková
- Country of origin: Czech Republic
- Original language: Czech
- No. of seasons: 2
- No. of episodes: 16

Production
- Running time: 55-75 minutes

Original release
- Network: Prima televize
- Release: May 8, 2021

Einstein – Případy nesnesitelného génia (Einstein) is a Czech television series from Prima televize. The series is about Professor Filip Koenig, who inherited genius from his great-great-grandfather Albert Einstein and now supports the Prague criminal police as a consultant. It is based on German series Einstein.

== Plot ==
33-year-old professor Filip Koening, born on July 25, 1986, is allegedly the great-great-grandson of Albert Einstein. Filip suffers from hereditary Huntington's disease and has 7 years left to live at most. He lives his life to the fullest due to this. When he tries to steal medicine from the doctor's office during one medical appointment to slow his deteriorating health, he is arrested and sent to prison. There he becomes involved in a murder investigation and slowly begins to unravel a complex case. The police understands that Filip could be useful with his genius reasoning. He gets an offer from the head of the Homicide Department n that he can become a consultant, or he can stay in prison. Filip chooses the first option, although he doesn't like it very much.

== Cast ==
Cast
Character	Actor	Seasons	Episodes	Year	Notes
prof. Mgr. Filip Koenig	Vojtěch Kotek	1,2	1–8	2021	33 year old university professor and advisor to the homicide department of Prague Police.
kpt. Mgr. Lenka Vrabcová	Anna Polívková	1,2	1–8	2021	Chief Commissioner of the Homicide Department who has a son Kryštof
mjr. Mgr. Ivan Urban	Pavel Zedníček	1,2	1–8	2021	Chief Commissioner, head of the homicide department
npor. Bc. Soňa Svobodová	Eva Podzimková	1,2	1–8	2021	Commissioner, forensic analyst, police technician and Lenka's best friend

== Episodes ==
=== Season 1 ===
No. in season	Title	Directed by	Written by	Original release date	Czech viewers (in millions)
1	"Kinetika"	Vojtěch Moravec	Marek Hlavica (Mathias Dinter, Martin Ritzenhoff a Thomas Jahn)	May 8, 2021	1.068
2	"Balistika"	Vojtěch Moravec	Marek Hlavica (Mathias Dinter, Martin Ritzenhoff a Thomas Jahn)	May 15, 2021	0.940
3	"Gravitace"	Vojtěch Moravec	Marek Hlavica (Mathias Dinter, Martin Ritzenhoff a Thomas Jahn)	May 22, 2021	0.928
4	"Mikrovlny"	Vojtěch Moravec	Marek Hlavica (Mathias Dinter, Martin Ritzenhoff a Thomas Jahn)	May 29, 2021	0.871
5	"Meganewton"	Vojtěch Moravec	Marek Hlavica (Mathias Dinter, Martin Ritzenhoff a Thomas Jahn)	June 5, 2021	0.726
6	"Termodynamika"	Vojtěch Moravec	Marek Hlavica (Mathias Dinter, Martin Ritzenhoff a Thomas Jahn)	June 12, 2021	0.695
7	"Magnetismus"	Vojtěch Moravec	Marek Hlavica (Mathias Dinter, Martin Ritzenhoff a Thomas Jahn)	June 19, 2021	0.606
8	"E.M.P."	Vojtěch Moravec	Marek Hlavica (Mathias Dinter, Martin Ritzenhoff a Thomas Jahn)	June 26, 2021	0.671

=== Season 2 ===
Season 2 premiered on streaming service Prima+ during July 2023. It was broadcast on Prima channel starting 25 October 2023.

No. in season	Title	Directed by	Written by	Original release date	Czech viewers (in millions)
1	"Optika"	Vojtěch Moravec	Marek Hlavica (Mathias Dinter, Martin Ritzenhoff a Thomas Jahn)	July 10, 2023	0.737
2	"Expanze"	Vojtěch Moravec	Marek Hlavica (Mathias Dinter, Martin Ritzenhoff a Thomas Jahn)	July 10, 2023	0.651
3	"Fluidita"	Vojtěch Moravec	Marek Hlavica (Mathias Dinter, Martin Ritzenhoff a Thomas Jahn)	July 17, 2023	0.648
4	"Amnézie"	Vojtěch Moravec	Marek Hlavica (Mathias Dinter, Martin Ritzenhoff a Thomas Jahn)	July 17, 2023	N/A
5	"Dioptrie"	Vojtěch Moravec	Marek Hlavica (Mathias Dinter, Martin Ritzenhoff a Thomas Jahn)	July 24, 2023	N/A
6	"Komprese"	Vojtěch Moravec	Marek Hlavica (Mathias Dinter, Martin Ritzenhoff a Thomas Jahn)	July 24, 2023	N/A
7	"Isobara"	Vojtěch Moravec	Marek Hlavica (Mathias Dinter, Martin Ritzenhoff a Thomas Jahn)	July 31, 2023	N/A
8	"Kolaps"	Vojtěch Moravec	Marek Hlavica (Mathias Dinter, Martin Ritzenhoff a Thomas Jahn)	July 31, 2023	N/A
