= Hospoda =

1996 Czech comedy television series

- Genre: Comedy
- Starring: Petr Nárožný; Josef Dvořák; Ladislav Potměšil; Bronislav Poloczek; Jiří Menzel; Jan Kanyza; Lubomír Lipský and many others
- Country of origin: Czech Republic
- Original language: Czech
- No. of seasons: 2
- No. of episodes: 52

Production
- Camera setup: multi camera
- Running time: 30 minutes

Original release
- Network: TV Nova
- Release: 1996 – 1997

Hospoda (in English Pub) is a Czech comedy television comedy that premiered on TV Nova. From 1996 to 1997, 52 episodes were aired.

== Production ==
The series was filmed in Barrandov Studios in Prague. Over the course of the series, 52 episodes were aired. Hospoda was the second TV Nova sitcom, after Nováci.

Many of the best Czech actors and actress appear in this series.

== Plot ==
The series follows the stories of ordinary people (the publican, entrepreneur, boilerman, psychiatrist, lawyer, chef ...), who meet in a pub for a beer.

== Cast and characters ==
- Petr Nárožný as Jaroslav Dušek, Victualler
- Josef Dvořák as Chef František / Kachna
- Ladislav Potměšil as Václav Novák
- Bronislav Poloczek as Tomáš Babula
- Jiří Krytinář as David Goliáš
- Jiří Menzel as Dr. Prášek MD
- Jan Kanyza as Dr. Vladimír Zatloukal, Lawyer
- Věra Tichánková as Vendula Jirásková
- Pavel Vondruška as Joska Váňa, Accordionist
- Lubomír Lipský as Alois Horáček
- Zuzana Bydžovská as Mařka, Waitress
- Václav Knop as Břetislav Jonáš, Pub Owner

== List of Episodes ==
- A Testament
- A Cook
- A Flamendr
- A Finding
- A Forbes
- A Casanova
- A Concert
- A Bus Driver
- Invaders
- An Attorney's Fees Deposit
- Truants
- A Time Clock
- A Rose
- Defenders
- An Ascetic
- A Commercial
- A Merry Christmas
- A Disciple
- A Hobo
- A Strike
- A First Time Parent
- A Football
- An Inventor
- A Bomb
- A Debt Owner
- A Meeting
- A Snack
- The Non-Smoker Day
- A Prophecy
- An Injury
- A Healer
- A Stand-in
- Love is Love
- A Thief
- A Play
- An Artist
- A Joke
- A Honoree
- A Rendezvous
- A Gamble
- A Joker
- Greybeards
- Hookers
- A Trip
- An Uncle
- A Calamity
- A Client
- An Excursionist
- The Day After
- An Eyelet
- A Dog
- A Celebration
