= Labyrint (Czech TV series) =

- Genre: Crime, Thriller
- Directed by: Jiří Strach
- Starring: Jiří Langmajer
- Country of origin: Czech Republic
- Original language: Czech
- No. of seasons: 3
- No. of episodes: 21

Production
- Running time: 61 minutes

Original release
- Network: ČT1
- Release: 2015 – 2018

Labyrint (Labyrinth) is a Czech crime TV series. It combines the genres of thriller and detective stories. It was directed by Jiří Strach. The first season of the series aired from 31 August to 12 October 2015, the second season from 13 March to 24 April 2017, and the third season from 3 September to 15 October 2018.

The series was nominated for the Czech Lion Award in the category Best TV Series, but did not win the award.

The series was ranked in a poll among iDNES.cz readers as the third best Czech crime series of the decade after Případy 1. oddělení and Rapl.

== Cast ==
- Jiří Langmajer as Michal Remeš (Season 1-3)
- Zuzana Kanócz as Tamara Hronská (Season 1)
- Stanislav Majer as Daniel Grossmann (Season 1)
- Miroslav Donutil as Colonel Jan Oliva (Season 1-3)
- Michal Dalecký as criminalist David (Season 1-3)
- Anna Linhartová as Andrea Remešová, Remeš' daughter (Season 1-2)
- Radomír Švec as medical examiner (Season 1-3)
- Zuzana Kajnarová as criminalist Irena (Season 1-2)
- Pavel Batěk as criminalist Petr (Season 1)
- Lenka Vlasáková as psychologist Ester Fuchsová (Season 1-3)
- Lenka Krobotová as Tereza Grossmannová, Daniel's wife (Season 1)
- Ivan Franěk as Stanislav Karas (Season 1)
- Pavla Vitázková as Zita Karasová (Season 1)
- Otmar Brancuzský as racer Šustr (Season 1)
- Gregor Bauer as hacker Roman Berdych (Season 1)
- Michal Režný as Štefan Králík (Season 1)
- Tomáš Stopa as Miro Szelenyi (Season 1)
- Dana Pešková as doctor (Season 1 and 3)
- Martin Sláma as journalist Jan Fábera (Season 1)
- Martin Zahálka as Oldřich Kovář (Season 1)
- Eva Vrbková as Jitka Kovářová (Season 1)
- Petra Tenorová as Alena Kovářová (Season 1)
- Jakub Janotík as Matěj Ráž (Season 1)
- Vojtěch Kotek as policeman Jan Souček (Season 1)
- Andrea Daňková as Lenka Součková, Souček's wife (Season 1)
- Miroslav Táborský as professor Vrbata (Season 1-3)
