= Sex O'Clock (TV series) =

- Genre: Comedy
- Directed by: Karolína Zalabáková and Jan Bártek
- Starring: Maxmilián Kocek
- Country of origin: Czech Republic
- Original language: Czech
- No. of seasons: 2
- No. of episodes: 20

Production
- Running time: 35 minutes

Original release
- Network: Voyo
- Release: March 10, 2023

Sex O'Clock is a 2023 Czech television series directed by Karolína Zalabáková and Jan Bártek. It is produced by the production company Cinebonbon for Voyo. The script was written jointly by Karolína Zalabáková and Matěj Randár. Voyo's creative producer is Marta Fenclová. It started broadcast on Voyo on 10 March 2023. On 3 August 2023 the series was renewed for second season.

== Synopsis ==
The protagonist of the series is a teenager Adam who focuses on his dancing career and effort to finally lose his virginity while his father turns the whole family's life upside down with the revelation that he is gay and leaves his family for another man. This starts a chain full of unexpected events.

== Cast and characters ==
- Maxmilián Kocek as Adam Anenský
- Karolin Omastová as Kristýna
- Petra Bučková as Judita Anenská
- Sára Korbelová as Ema Anenská
- Tom Sean Pšenička as David
- Jan Révai as Michal Anenský
- Csongor Kassai as Patrik
- Leona Skleničková as Alice
- Iva Kruntorádová as Monika
- Jana Švandová as Greta
- Lucie Siposová as Berta
- Kristýna Leichtová as Dita
- Viviean Machková as Kučavíková
- Eva Podzimková as school psychologist
- Jakub Žáček as George
- Iva Pazderková as David's mom
- Vojtěch Vodochodský as Koudy
- Josef Carda as teacher Hilbert
- Little Caprice as herself
