= Co ste hasiči =

- Genre: Comedy
- Directed by: Jan Haluza; Tomáš Pavlíček; Vladimír Skórka
- Starring: Petr Rychlý
- Country of origin: Czech Republic
- Original language: Czech
- No. of seasons: 1
- No. of episodes: 16

Production
- Running time: 55 minutes
- Production company: Orbis Pictures

Original release
- Network: TV Nova
- Release: July 9, 2021

Co ste hasiči is a Czech comedy TV series created by Orbis Pictures for TV Nova. The series premiered on 2 July 2021 on Voyo and on July 9, 2021, on TV Nova.

In 2023, the second season of the series started broadcast on Voyo on 25 August and on TV Nova on 1 September 2023.

== Plot ==
=== Season 1 ===
The story takes place in a small village Horní in the middle of the Ladův kraj and follows life of the local fire department under the leadership of straightforward commander Petr Pospíšil. Firefighters have to deal with rescuing cats from trees and fighting small fires in the nearby forest. However, the corrupt mayor Vladimír Urban (has other plans for the fire brigade, and his attempts to disrupt the brigade bring comical conflicts and tension to the entire village.

=== Season 2 ===
The association of volunteer firefighters from the small village of Horní, headed by the quirky commander Petr, returns in full, including Mirek, Eda, Láďa and veterinarian Lenka must once again face the self-confident mayor Vladimír together), whose great hobby is to make life miserable for the fire crew. This time, a bitter fight will begin over whether or not the old fire station should exist.

== Cast ==
- Petr Rychlý as Petr Pospíšil, bus driver and commander of volunteer firefighters
- Václav Kopta as Mayor Ing. Vladimír Urban
- Marek Holý as Mirek Moucha
- Jaromír Nosek as Láďa
- Radim Kalvoda as mechanic Eda Vejprta
- Lucie Benešová as Bára Urbanová, Vladimír's wife
- Nela Boudová as Marie Pospíšilová
- Jana Bernášková as MVDr. Lenka Mouchová
- Martin Pechlát as Jára
