= Zákony vlka =

- Genre: Crime, Thriller
- Created by: Gabriela Erleová, Robert Geisler
- Written by: Robert Geisler, Tomáš Hodan, Iva Klestilová, Gabriela Erleová
- Directed by: Marek Najbrt
- Starring: Stanislav Majer, Linda Rybová
- Country of origin: Czech Republic
- Original language: Czech
- No. of seasons: 2
- No. of episodes: 16

Production
- Running time: 60 minutes
- Production company: 3GMedia

Original release
- Network: Prima televize
- Release: 2023

Zákony vlka (The Laws of the Wolf) is a Czech television series that airs in 2023. It is directed by Marek Najbrt. It starrs Stanislav Majer as former criminal Robert Černý who is released from prison and assumes identity of a policeman in village in Brdy. First episode is to air on 18 March 2023 on Prima and its streaming service Prima+. Lucie Kršáková stated on 20 February 2023 that season 2 is in development. Season 2 is set to start broadcast on 16 September 2023 replacing Eliška a Damián in prime time. The series was renewed for season 3.

== Plot ==
Thief Robert Černý gets early release from prison. Coincidence brings him to the other side of the law. He finds himself in a remote village near border, with which he is connected not only by his fateful relationship with Sára but also by unresolved issues from the past.

== Cast ==
- Stanislav Majer as Robert Černý
- Linda Rybová as Sára Pokorná
- Jan Vondráček as Jiří Pokorný
- Tereza Švejdová as stržm. Kamila Žáčková
- Eliška Zelenková as Klára Pokorná
- Jan Novotný as prap. Zdeněk Bureš
- Kristýna Frejová as MUDr. Hana Brožková
- Josef Polášek as Josef Horák
- Martin Myšička as Vilém Karas
- Jan Grundman as npor. Šimon Wilk

== Production ==
The series was produced by 3GMedia. Gabriela Erleová and Robert Geisler are listed as authors of series. It was filmed in Brdy forests. Season 2 started filming in Mníšek during March 2023.

== Episodes ==
=== Season 1 (2023) ===
| No. | Title | Directed by | Written by | Original release date | Czech viewers (millions) |
|---|---|---|---|---|---|
| 1 | "Škodná v revíru" | Marek Najbrt | Robert Geisler | March 18, 2023 | 0.964 |
| 2 | "Příliš křehká pravda" | Marek Najbrt | Unknown | March 25, 2023 | 0.875 |
| 3 | "Poslední školení" | Marek Najbrt | Unknown | April 1, 2023 | 0.886 |
| 4 | "Ukradená láska" | Marek Najbrt | Unknown | April 8, 2023 | 0.963 |
| 5 | "Zkouška" | Marek Najbrt | Unknown | April 15, 2023 | 0.936 |
| 6 | "Únos" | Marek Najbrt | Unknown | April 22, 2023 | 0.885 |
| 7 | "Na dně" | Marek Najbrt | Unknown | April 29, 2023 | 0.830 |
| 8 | "Hon na vlka" | Marek Najbrt | Unknown | May 6, 2023 | 0.824 |

=== Season 2 ===
| No. | Title | Directed by | Written by | Original release date | Czech viewers (millions) |
|---|---|---|---|---|---|
| 1 | "Modus operandi" | Marek Najbrt | Robert Geisler | September 16, 2023 | 0.578 |
| 2 | "Čestný závazek" | Marek Najbrt | Robert Geisler | September 23, 2023 | 0.661 |
| 3 | "Třetí do páru" | Marek Najbrt | Robert Geisler | September 30, 2023 | 0.736 |
| 4 | "Vánoční překvapení" | Marek Najbrt | Robert Geisler | October 7, 2023 | 0.772 |
| 5 | "Restart" | Marek Najbrt | Robert Geisler | October 14, 2023 | 0.566 |
| 6 | "Nenávist" | Marek Najbrt | Robert Geisler | October 21, 2023 | 0.560 |
| 7 | "Falešná hra" | Marek Najbrt | Robert Geisler | October 28, 2023 | 0.712 |
| 8 | "Zúčtování" | Marek Najbrt | Robert Geisler | November 4, 2023 | 0.598 |
