= Vytoč mého agenta =

- Genre: Comedy, Drama
- Starring: Kryštof Hádek; Tomáš Maštalír; Martha Issová; Zuzana Kronerová
- Countries of origin: Czech Republic; Slovakia
- Original languages: Czech; Slovak
- No. of seasons: 1
- No. of episodes: 8

Production
- Running time: 56-59 minutes

Original release
- Network: Prima televize TV JOJ
- Release: 10 January – 31 January 2024

Vytoč mého agenta (Slovak title: Vytoč môjho agenta; English: Call My Agent) is a Czech-Slovak comedy drama television series coproduced by FTV Prima and TV JOJ. It is a Czech and Slovak version of French series Call My Agent!. It was initially released on Prima+ and JOJ Play streaming services before being broadcast in television. Many Czech and Slovak celebrities appeared in the series as fictional versions of themselves.

== Cast ==
- Kryštof Hádek as agent Jiří Beneš
- Tomáš Maštalír as agent Marian Klimek
- Martha Issová as agent Andrea Martenová
- Zuzana Kronerová as agent Yveta Lorencová
- Daniel Krejčík as Hugo Šimek, Beneš' assistant
- Sarah Haváčová as Dana Nosková, Marian's assistant
- Viktória Jurištová as Kamila Luknárová
- Thao Řípová as receptioner Eliška

== Episodes ==
| Episode | Directed by | Written by | Original air date (Prima+/JOJ Play) | Original air date (JOJ) | Original air date (Prima) | Czech viewers (millions) |
|---|---|---|---|---|---|---|
| 1 | Michal Blaško | Martina Kinská | 10 January 2024 | 20 March 2024 | 24 March 2024 | 0.673 |
| 2 | Michal Blaško | Tomáš Hodan | 10 January 2024 | 27 March 2024 | 31 March 2024 | 0.285 |
| 3 | Jakub Machala | Tomáš Hodan | 17 January 2024 | 3 April 2024 | 7 April 2024 | 0.247 |
| 4 | Jakub Machala | Martina Kinská | 17 January 2024 | 10 April 2024 | 14 April 2024 | 0.231 |
| 5 | Jakub Machala | Tomáš Hodan | 24 January 2024 | 17 April 2024 | 21 April 2024 | 0.241 |
| 6 | Jakub Machala | Martina Kinská | 24 January 2024 | 17 April 2024 | 28 April 2024 | —N/a |
| 7 | Michal Blaško | Tomáš Hodan | 31 January 2024 | 24 April 2024 | 5 May 2024 | —N/a |
| 8 | Michal Blaško | Martina Kinská | 31 January 2024 | 24 April 2024 | 5 May 2024 | —N/a |
