= Taneční =

- Genre: Comedy
- Written by: Ivana Hokrová
- Directed by: Jiří Vejdělek
- Starring: Jitka Ježková; Saša Rašilov
- Country of origin: Czech Republic
- Original language: Czech
- No. of seasons: 1
- No. of episodes: 8

Production
- Producer: Matěj Podzimek
- Running time: 60 minutes

Original release
- Network: TV Nova

Taneční is a Czech comedy TV series produced by TV Nova and directed by Jiří Vejdělek.

== Synopsis ==
Monika and Oldřich are a married couple who used to win dance competitions all the time together. Oldřich likes to lead and Monika has to dance as Oldřich leads her even in common life. That's when Monika starts to get tired of it. When Oldřich starts organizing dance lessons for students at the local high school with Monika, he gets in his element while Monika starts to get tired of it. Until the situation gets difficult when Monika's ex-partner Karel shows up and Monika's free-spirited sister Tereza somehow gets involved. It seems that Oldřich has to give up his role as a master of dance and life if he wants to still have someone to dance with.

== Cast and characters ==
- Jitka Ježková as Monika
- Saša Rašilov as Oldřich
- Daniela Kolářová as Eva
- Dana Batulková as Pavlína
- Hana Vagnerová as Tereza
- Roman Zach as Karel
- Zuzana Norisová
- Alžbeta Stanková
- Vasil Fridrich
- Anna Marie Fučíková
- Antonín Holoubek
- Daniel Žižka as Jakub Ledvina
- Jennifer Baluchová
- Anna Dvořáková
- Jan Fanta
- Daniel Maslák
- Laura Kopecká
- Eva Leinweberová

== Production ==
The series was mostly filme in Central Bohemia including Prague and Poděbrady.
