= Mozaika =

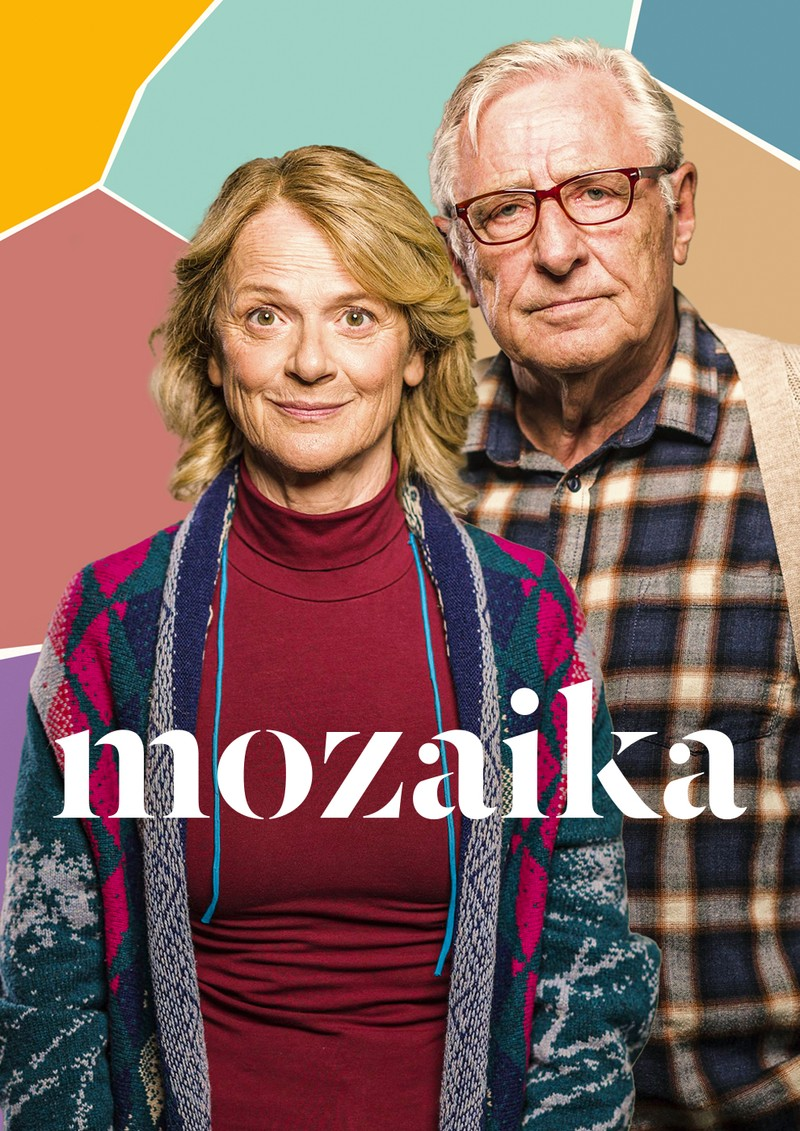
- Genre: Comedy
- Directed by: Jasmina Blaževic; Lenka Wimmerová
- Starring: Taťjana Medvecká; Karel Heřmánek
- Country of origin: Czech Republic
- Original language: Czech
- No. of seasons: 1
- No. of episodes: 16

Production
- Running time: 55 minutes
- Production company: Lucky Man Pictures

Original release
- Network: Voyo
- Release: June 11 – August 1, 2024

Mozaika (Mosaic) is a 2024 Czech series directed by Jasmina Blaževic and Lenka Wimmerová. It is produced by production company Lucky Man Pictures for Voyo and TV Nova. The author of the screenplay is Alice Nellis. The creative producer of Voyo is Iva K. Jestřábová and the producers of Lucky Man Pictures are Daria Špačková and David Ondříček.

Taťjána Medvecká and Karel Heřmánek appear in the main roles. Other cast include David Máj, Martha Issová, Kristýna Ryška, Marek Adamczyk, Jan Nedbal, Tomáš Drápela, Eva Podzimková, Ondřej Malý, Sabina Remundová, Zuzana Mauréry, Václav Kopta, Sophie Šporclová, František Randýsek and others.

The series premiered on Voyo on 11 June 2024.

== Plot ==
The series tells about a large family. It is shaken by the sudden announcement of parents that they are separating. They must find themselves before they separate.

== Cast ==
- Taťjana Medvecká as Helena Jirsová
- Karel Heřmánek as Jindřich Jirsa
- David Máj as Richard
- Martha Issová as Běla
- Marek Adamczyk as David
- Kristýna Ryška as Lucie
- Jan Nedbal as Michal
- Tomáš Drápela as Vojta
- Eva Podzimková as Madla

== List of episodes ==
1. Přineseniny
2. Rodiče
3. Velké stěhování
4. Mezipatra
5. Jinak
6. Nálezy a ztráty
7. Nové začátky
8. Nablízko
9. Překvapení
10. Tajemství
11. Tátové
12. Pozvání
13. Bio nebo nebio
14. Šachmat
15. Dvojčata
16. Velká rodina
