= Bóra =

- Genre: Crime comedy
- Written by: Zuzana Marianková; Zdeněk Jecelín
- Directed by: Zuzana Marianková; Marek Najbrt
- Starring: Vojtěch Kotek; Tomáš Maštalír
- Countries of origin: Czech Republic; Slovakia
- Original languages: Czech; Slovak
- No. of seasons: 1
- No. of episodes: 6

Production
- Running time: 60 Minutes

Original release
- Network: TV Nova; Markíza
- Release: June 13 – July 18, 2025

Bóra is a Czech-Slovak crime comedy television series. The detective comedy for the Oneplay platform is directed by Marek Najbrt and Zuzana Marianková, who co-wrote the screenplay with Zdeněk Jecelín. The series stars Vojtěch Kotek, Zuzana Mauréry, Tomáš Maštalír, Klára Melíšková, Stanislav Majer, Aňa Geislerová, Jan Révai, Elizaveta Maximová, Maroš Kramár, Jana Krausová, Ivan Lupták, Predrag Bjelac and others.

== Plot ==
Bora is set on a Croatian island rented by a Czech travel agency. A special course called "Encounters with Death" takes place there for a group of Czechs and Slovaks. Strong storm driven by a hurricane hits the island leaving ten course participants and their leader Chail cut off from the outside world by a wild sea. Tension begins to build in the group, conflicts arise, and unexpected plot twists occur while Chail is found murdered.

== Cast and characters ==
- Vojtěch Kotek as Samuel
- Tomáš Maštalír as Švehla
- Jozef Vajda as German
- Klára Melíšková as Palečková
- Elizaveta Maximová as Janovská
- Zuzana Mauréry as Širáková
- Jan Révai as Chail
- Stanislav Majer as Pepa
- Daniel Fischer as Bočkay
- Rostislav Novák as Perniš
- Ivan Lupták as Šóšik
- Ondrej Kovaľ as Faludsky/Bartakovič
- Aňa Geislerová as Rešutíková
- Jan Kolařík as Bagačka
- Richard Autner as Halaj
- Maroš Kramár as Mixtaj
- Jana Krausová as Koudelková
- Predrag Bjelac as Dragan

== Episodes ==
Episode		Directed by	Written by	Original air date (Voyo)	Original air date (Nova)	Czech viewers (millions)
1	Smrt vám neuteče	Zuzana Marianková, Marek Najbrt	Zuzana Marianková, Zdeněk Jecelín	13 June 2025	TBA	TBA
2	Jeden z nás	Zuzana Marianková, Marek Najbrt	Zuzana Marianková, Zdeněk Jecelín	20 June 2025	TBA	TBA
3	Poslední soud se blíží	Zuzana Marianková, Marek Najbrt	Zuzana Marianková, Zdeněk Jecelín	27 June 2025	TBA	TBA
4	Normální workshop	Zuzana Marianková, Marek Najbrt	Zuzana Marianková, Zdeněk Jecelín	4 July 2025	TBA	TBA
5	Mořská vlna	Zuzana Marianková, Marek Najbrt	Zuzana Marianková, Zdeněk Jecelín	11 July 2025	TBA	TBA
6	Na každú opicu má Boh palicu	Zuzana Marianková, Marek Najbrt	Zuzana Marianková, Zdeněk Jecelín	18 July 2025	TBA	TBA
