= Sedm schodů k moci =

- Genre: Political Drama
- Written by: Josef Klíma, Lenka Hornová
- Directed by: Jiří Chlumský, Martin Kopp
- Starring: Eva Podzimková, Jiří Vyorálek, Pavel Batěk
- Country of origin: Czech Republic
- Original language: Czech
- No. of seasons: 1
- No. of episodes: 8

Production
- Running time: 57-64 minutes

Original release
- Network: Prima+
- Release: February 8 – March 1, 2023

Sedm schodů k moci (Stairway to Power) is a 2023 Czech television series broadcast by Prima televize. It is a political drama inspired by 2013 Czech political corruption scandal. It follows Anna Malá who rises from a waitress to a powerful background political player.

== Plot ==
The series tells the story of Anna Malá, an ordinary woman who lives in the countryside and works in a local pub. Over time she moves to Prague due to unpleasant circumstances and starts to work as a waitress at the Chamber of Deputies. There she becomes increasingly interested in politics. She also meets tabloid journalist Ivan Krčka who then watches her ries to power. Malá gets to the Ministry of Culture. There her journey to the top begins. Gradually, she takes a liking to power, influential men and luxury. Finally, the fall comes and Anna Malá is accused of corruption and abuse of power.

== Cast ==
- Eva Podzimková as Anna Malá (inspired by Jana Nagyová-Nečasová)
- Jiří Vyorálek as Minister Tomáš Vichr (inspired by Petr Nečas)
- Pavel Batěk as Ivan Krčka, journalist
- Tomáš Měcháček as Martin Lachman, MP (inspired by Marek Dalík)
- Veronika Žilková as Ivana Šustrová
- Jana Krausová as Věra Malá, Anna's mother
- Michal Novotný as Chef Václav
- Michal Dalecký as Vladimír Hadraba, MP
- Alžbeta Stanková as buffet lady Zdena
- Soňa Norisová as Milada Fajfrová, MP
- Jiří Štrébl as Šebesta, Communist MP
- Jiří Bábek as Káša, MP (inspired by Miroslav Kalousek)
- Pavla Gajdošíková as Hanka, Anna's friend
- Pavel Řezníček as Šíma, lobbyist
- Přemysl Bureš as Prime Minister Dub (inspired by Mirek Topolánek)
- Bára Munzarová as Coufalová
- Vladimír Škultéty as Vilém Netík
- Luboš Veselý as Rozehnal

== Episodes ==
Episode	Directed by	Written by	Original air date (Prima+)	Original air date (Prima)	Czech viewers (millions)
1	Jiří Chlumský, Martin Kopp	Josef Klíma, Lenka Hornová	8 February 2023	28 January 2024	0.827
2	Jiří Chlumský, Martin Kopp	Josef Klíma, Lenka Hornová	8 February 2023	4 February 2024	0.886
3	Jiří Chlumský, Martin Kopp	Josef Klíma, Lenka Hornová	15 February 2023	11 February 2024	0.852
4	Jiří Chlumský, Martin Kopp	Josef Klíma, Lenka Hornová	15 February 2023	18 February 2024	0.831
5	Jiří Chlumský, Martin Kopp	Josef Klíma, Lenka Hornová	22 February 2023	25 February 2024	0.848
6	Jiří Chlumský, Martin Kopp	Josef Klíma, Lenka Hornová	22 February 2023	3 March 2024	0.902
7	Jiří Chlumský, Martin Kopp	Josef Klíma, Lenka Hornová	1 March 2023	10 March 2024	0.898
8	Jiří Chlumský, Martin Kopp	Josef Klíma, Lenka Hornová	1 March 2023	17 March 2024	0.963
