= The Roubal Case =

- Genre: Crime Drama
- Written by: Tomáš Bombík; Zdeněk Jecelín; Václav Hašek
- Directed by: Tereza Kopáčová
- Starring: Kamila Trnková; David Švehlík; Dagmar Havlová; Hynek Čermák
- Country of origin: Czech Republic
- Original language: Czech
- No. of seasons: 1
- No. of episodes: 3

Production
- Running time: 45-51 minutes
- Production company: Evolution Films

Original release
- Network: Voyo
- Release: November 26 – December 10, 2021

The Roubal Case (Czech: Případ Roubal) is a three-part television miniseries by TV Nova, which premiered on the Voyo platform during November and December 2021. It was filmed by director Tereza Kopáčová in the production of Evolution Films. It is inspired by the real events surrounding serial killer Ivan Roubal. Hynek Čermák, Kamila Trnková, Vojtěch Vodochodský, Dagmar Havlová, Jan Čenský and David Švehlík starred in the series.

== Plot ==
Two men die during a robbery of a car repair shop. Ivan Roubal is accused of the murder. State attorney Markéta Neumannová and criminal investigator Jakub Miller suspect him of committing six more murders. Junior defense attorney Daniela gets her first opportunity from her boss who is representing Roubal ex offo to demonstrate what she can do. She is successful, challenging the testimony of a key witness in court. Ivan Roubal is about to be released from custody and threatens to kill again. The investigators have 40 hours left to stop it. They are looking for a woman who may have been an accomplice to the murder of Václav Dlouhý who was engaged in filming and distributing porn. Daniela digs deeper into the case and comes across disturbing facts. The trial has entered its final phase, but the police still have no evidence that would stand up in court. Daniela leaves her position as a paralegal and manages to get a key piece of information.

== Cast ==
- Hynek Čermák as Ivan Roubal
- David Švehlík as mjr. Bc. Jakub Miller
- Dagmar Havlová as prosecutor Mgr. Markéta Neumannová
- Kamila Trnková as junior attorney Bc. Daniela Stolařová
- Jan Čenský as JUDr. Hynek Pokorný, defense attorney
- Vojtěch Vodochodský as Bc. Roman Kraus, prosecutor's assistant
- Jiří Roskot as npor. Martin Pražák, policeman
- Aleš Petráš as por. Petr Anděl, policeman
- Zdeněk Julina as kpt. Ivo Kramář, policeman
- Helena Dvořáková as Hana Marková, Roubal's girlfriend
- Jan Komínek as Tomáš Kovář
- Štěpán Tuček as Petr Mráz
- Cyril Dobrý as Michal Olah
- Jan Šaněk as Václav Dlouhý
- Petr Franěk as František Heppner
- Verica Nedeska as Nataša, Heppner's girlfriend
- Regina Rázlová as Holešová
- Jitka Sedláčková as Manuela
- Vojtěch Hrabák as Viktor Roubal, Roubal's son
- Jan Slovák as judge JUDr. Zapletal
- Jan Antonín Duchoslav as judge JUDr. Dvorský
- Jan Holík as judge JUDr. Antonín Janata
- Martin Siničak as judge JUDr. Dušan Jílek
- Matěj Šumbera as Marek Hybš
- Daniel Krečmar as Oleg Azarov
- Michal Dalecký as junior attorney
- Jacob Erftemeijer as policeman in prison
- Vlasta Žehrová as secretary

== Production ==
It is the first miniseries filmed under the brand Voyo Original. Jan Štoček, a former policeman from the Prague murder party was behind the capture of many of criminals including Ivan Roubal served as an expert advisor. Stoček became the prototype for the character played by David Švehlík in the miniseries.

== Episodes ==
Episode	Written by	Original air date	Czech viewers (millions)
1	Tomáš Bombík, Zdeněk Jecelín, Václav Hašek	26 November 2021	
2	Tomáš Bombík, Zdeněk Jecelín, Václav Hašek	3 December 2021	
3	Tomáš Bombík, Zdeněk Jecelín, Václav Hašek	10 December 2021	
