= Policie Modrava =

- Genre: Crime drama
- Directed by: Jaroslav Soukup
- Starring: Soňa Norisová, Jaroslav Satoranský, Filip Tomsa
- Country of origin: Czech Republic
- Original language: Czech
- No. of seasons: 4
- No. of episodes: 40

Production
- Running time: 50-55 minutes

Original release
- Network: TV Nova
- Release: 2011 – 2022

Policie Modrava is a Czech crime drama television series which premiered on TV Nova in 2011. The series was cancelled after the pilot aired on 9 October 2011 due to financial problems, but was renewed in 2012. The series premiered after four years on 1 March 2015. Soňa Norisová, Jaroslav Satoranský, Filip Tomsa and others appear in the main roles.

On 8 June 2015, TV Nova announced that it was preparing a second season, which was broadcast in autumn 2017.

The day after the final episode of the second season aired on 16 October 2017, it was announced that the series had been renewed for a third season. It was filmed in June 2018. The third season appeared on the screens in 2019 in the fall. The fourth season was filmed from the beginning of June to the end of October 2021 and appeared on screens in autumn 2022.

The series was nominated for the Czech Lion 2016 in the category Best Dramatic TV Series, but did not win the award.

== Plot ==
Criminal investigator Jana Vinická arrives in Kašperské Hory in Šumava to take up the vacant position of head of the local police department. From the beginning, she faces mistrust and unwelcomeness from her male subordinates. In each episode of the series, she solves a new criminal case Šumava.

== Cast and characters ==
- Soňa Norisová as kpt. Jana Vinická
- Jaroslav Satoranský as mjr. Václav Koutný
- Filip Tomsa as por. Kamil Sedláček
- Zdeněk Palusga as por. Vlasta Nováček
- Jan Monczka as npor. Karel Franc
- Matěj Dadák as ppor. Josef Vítek
- Jaroslava Stránská as stržm. Lucie Krásenská
- Michal Holán as por. Jarmil Votava
- Jiří Racek as Petr Mládek – police technician
- Matěj Anděl as Vojtěch Dvořák – police IT
- Jan Pohan as mjr. Ruda Racek
- Stanislav Hybler as the head of the forest administration Ing. Radek Hofman
- Martin Davídek as MUDr. Martin Beneš
- Petr Pelzer as medical examiner MUDr. Pavel Šedivý
