= Nováci =

- Genre: Sitcom
- Directed by: Vladimír Drha and Jiří Adamec
- Country of origin: Czech Republic
- Original language: Czech
- No. of seasons: 2

Production
- Running time: 20 – 30 minutes (per episode)

Original release
- Network: TV Nova
- Release: 19 April 1995

Nováci is a Czech sitcom that ran for two seasons, first broadcast on 19 April 1995. Directed by Vladimír Drha and Jiří Adamec, it was the first television comedy series to be shown on TV Nova. The sitcom's main storyline revolves around a Czech family called Nováci. The family hosts an American student of sociology, Jeremy Washington, who eventually purchases a home from a family involved with the Russian mafia.

== Season 1 ==
Nováci's first season, which ran from 19 April 1995 to 27 December 1995, included 72 episodes.

Episode name	Episode number	Duration
Profesorův dopis	1	30 minutes
Mafie	2	30 minutes
Nečekané dědictví	3	25 minutes
Hlava rodiny	4	30 minutes
Poslední urugská princezna	5	25 minutes
Pizza do domu	6	20 minutes
Bábinka	7	30 minutes
Voodoo	8	30 minutes
Čínská pomsta	9	25 minutes
Český sen	10	20 minutes
Inzerát	11	20 minutes
Smrťák	12	25 minutes
Nečekaná návštěva	13	30 minutes
Nápadník	14	20 minutes
Dvojník	15	30 minutes
Pánská jízda	16	25 minutes
Vše pro lásku	17	24 minutes
Dvojník	18	24 minutes
Divoch	19	23 minutes
Pánská jízda	20	23 minutes
Hiro šima	21	30 minutes
Patogení zóny	22	30 minutes
Dočista dočista	23	30 minutes
Služka	24	20 minutes
Sportem ku zdraví	25	30 minutes
Píp show	26	20 minutes
Záletnice	27	20 minutes
Člověče, nezlob se!	28	30 minutes
Hrobka	29	20 minutes
Rozverný drát	30	30 minutes
Náměsíčník	31	30 minutes
Strýček Jerry	32	20 minutes
Trpaslík	33	25 minutes
Tabu	34	25 minutes
Novákův univerzální robot	35	25 minutes
Milosrdná lež	36	30 minutes
Day after	37	30 minutes
Dovolená	38	25 minutes
Byznis je byznis	39	25 minutes
Na vlastní kůži	40	25 minutes
Ahmed	41	20 minutes
Prémie	42	25 minutes
Dobročinný spolek	43	30 minutes
Velké trápení	44	25 minutes
Vůně noci	45	25 minutes
Blesk a lesk	46	25 minutes
Přítelkyně	47	25 minutes
Střecha z Ameriky	48	30 minutes
Slaměný vdovec	49	25 minutes
Zbrojní pas	50	30 minutes
Výhra	51	30 minutes
Nepřiměřená obrana	52	25 minutes
Životní šance	53	30 minutes
Pomoc v nouzi	54	25 minutes
Ples	55	30 minutes
Chrám blahoslavené Kunhuty	56	30 minutes
Scotland Yard zasahuje	57	30 minutes
Podvodník Jerry	58	30 minutes
Kořeny	59	25 minutes
Hrobníkovi námluvy	60	25 minutes
Socha	61	30 minutes
K čertu s Mikulášem	62	25 minutes
Věno	63	25 minutes
Stá dieta	64	30 minutes
Nezaměstnaný milionář	65	25 minutes
Dědkové mohou všechno	66	25 minutes
Výročí	67	30 minutes
Bilance	68	30 minutes
Lhář telefon	69	25 minutes
Pastouška	70	30 minutes
Harpagon	71	30 minutes
Rekomando	72	30 minutes

== Season 2 ==
In January 1996, production began on Season 2 (sometimes called Nováci 2), which had 52 episodes. This was essentially a new series with a new plot, new characters, new actors, and new writers. Only the director Jiří Adamec remained from the original production staff.

Episode name	Episode number	Duration
Albert	1	25 minutes
Dáme si do bytu	2	30 minutes
Hádej, kdo přijde na večírek	3	30 minutes
Past na bábi	4	30 minutes
Návštěva	5	25 minutes
Léčba neklidem	6	25 minutes
Za vším je žena	7	25 minutes
Změna je život	8	30 minutes
Tapeta	9	30 minutes
Matýsek	10	25 minutes
Užít dne	11	30 minutes
Čangova metoda	12	30 minutes
Večírek na Tahiti	13	25 minutes
Pohlednice z dětství	14	25 minutes
Miss tričko	15	25 minutes
Doupě neřesti	16	25 minutes
Vernisáž	17	25 minutes
Být bit jako chlap	18	25 minutes
Chudáci Nováci	19	30 minutes
Podzimní plamen	20	25 minutes
Rána osudu	21	30 minutes
Dopadení	22	30 minutes
Malé velké radosti	23	30 minutes
Sen o moři	24	30 minutes
Med a cibule	25	30 minutes
Venuše s pumpičkou	26	30 minutes
Fajfka	27	25 minutes
Kdo se směje naposled	28	30 minutes
Pankáč v županu	29	30 minutes
Rakev	30	30 minutes
Obraz	31	30 minutes
Hezký den	32	25 minutes
Čepice	33	30 minutes
Zkušební provoz	34	25 minutes
Dům hrůzy	35	30 minutes
Svinským krokem	36	30 minutes
Taneční pro pokročilé	37	25 minutes
Miláček	38	30 minutes
Zámek	39	25 minutes
Noční hlídka	40	25 minutes
Kapku po kapce	41	30 minutes
Popelčino odpoledne	42	30 minutes
Povolávací rozkaz	43	25 minutes
Perný den	44	30 minutes
Sanatorium duše	45	30 minutes
Bomba	46	30 minutes
Svět podle Jardy	47	30 minutes
Brejle	48	30 minutes
Soutěž elegance	49	25 minutes
Deníček	50	30 minutes
Co Čech to muzikant	51	30 minutes
Bingo	52	30 minutes

== Cast ==
=== Season 1 ===
- Ota Jirák as father Novák
- Jana Janěková as mother Nováková
- Filip Rajmont as son
- Jitka Ježková as daughter
- Paulo Nanque as Jerry

=== Season 2 ===
- Pavel Zedníček as father Novák
- Jana Paulová as mother Nováková
- Jitka Schneiderová as daughter
- Robert Galia as son
