= Polda (TV series) =

- Genre: Crime
- Written by: Tomáš Holeček, Richard Malatinský, Zdeněk Zapletal, Václav Hašek
- Directed by: Jaroslav Fuit
- Starring: David Matásek; Igor Orozovič; Vladimír Polívka
- Country of origin: Czech Republic
- Original language: Czech
- No. of seasons: 6
- No. of episodes: 64

Production
- Running time: 55 minutes

Original release
- Network: Prima televize
- Release: October 23, 2016 – April 10, 2024

Polda (Cop) is a Czech television series that has been broadcast by Prima televize since October 23, 2016.

The Polda series tells the story of a lieutenant who returns to duty after twenty years in a coma. During that time, not only the world around him changed, but also his family situation. It is renewed for sixth season that started broadcast on 21 February 2024.

== Cast ==
- David Matásek as por. Bc. Michal Bříza
- Igor Orozovič as por. Bc. Andrej Křížek
- Vladimír Polívka as por. JUDr. Vojtěch Urban
- Ondřej Pavelka as mjr. Mgr. Martin Fišer
- Jana Kolesárová as kpt. PhDr. Mgr. Taťjana (Táňa) Hošková
- Jiří Vyorálek as MUDr. Robert Mráz
- Lenka Vlasáková as Eliška Břízová
- Jitka Sedláčková as Vanda Nováková-Fišerová
