= List of Czech films of the 2020s =

A List of Czech films of the 2020s.

Title	Director	Cast	Distributor	Genre	Length	Notes
2020
11 Colors of the Bird	Vojtěch Kopecký	Václav Marhoul, Udo Kier, Jitka Čvančarová	Bioscop	Documentary	120 Minutes	About production of The Painted Bird.
3Grapes	Martin Kopp	Kryštof Hádek, Tereza Ramba	Bioscop	Comedy	101 Minutes	Sequel to Grapes and 2Grapes.
Alpha Code	Keoni Waxman	Bren Foster, Denise Richards		Sci-fi Thriller	97 Minutes	
Bet on Friendship	Patrik Hartl	Martin Pechlát, David Švehlík, Hynek Čermák, Martin Hofmann	Bontonfilm	Comedy	118 Minutes	Based on a book of the same name.
Betrayer	Biser A. Arichtev	Marián Labuda jr.	Česká televize	Historical	166 Minutes	Film about Emanuel Moravec.
Bourák	Ondřej Trojan	Ivan Trojan	Falcon a.s.	Comedy	110 Minutes	
Butterfly Vision	Maksym Nakonechnyi	Rita Burkovska	Krutón	Drama	107 Minutes	Coproduction with Ukraine.
Cakes	Rudolf Havlík	Ondřej Vetchý, Jana Plodková, Lenka Vlasáková	CinemArt	Romantic Comedy	97 Minutes	
The Case of the Deceased Dead	Miloslav Šmídmajer	David Novotný, Hana Vagnerová	Falcon a.s.	Crime, Comedy	97 Minutes	
Caught in the Net	Vít Klusák	Tereza Těžká, Anežka Pithartová, Sabina Dlouhá	Aerofilms	Documentary	100 Minutes	
Charlatan	Agnieszka Holland	Ivan Trojan	Cinemart	Historical drama	118 Minutes	Premieres at 70th Berlin International Film Festival
Chlap na střídačku	Petr Zahrádka	Jiří Langmajer	Bohemia MP	Comedy	109 Minutes	
Cook F**k Kill	Mira Fornay	Jaroslav Plesl, Regina Rázlová	Cinemart	Drama	116 Minutes	
Daria	Matěj Pichler	Jaromír Nosek, Klára Miklasová	Bontonfilm	Thriller	89 Minutes	
Droneman	Petr Zelenka	Kryštof Hádek, Jiří Mádl	Falcon a.s.	Psychological thriller	109 Minutes	
Enchanted Feather	Zdeněk Troška	Anastasia Chocholatá, Lukáš Pavlásek	Cinemart	Fairy Tale	95 Minutes	
Havel	Slávek Horák	Viktor Dvořák	Bontonfilm	Historical	105 Minutes	Based on life of Václav Havel.
Listen	David Laňka, Martin Müller	Kristýna Podzimková, Aleš Bílík	Bontonfilm	Thriller	77 Minutes	
My Story	Libor Adam, Hana Hendrychová	Vlastina Svátková, Saša Rašilov	Falcon a.s.	Romantic drama	90 Minutes	
Never Say Never Again	Braňo Mišík	Tereza Kostková, Tomáš Maštalír	Bontonfilm	Romantic Comedy	104 Minutes	Coproduction with Slovakia.
Shadow Country	Bohdan Sláma	Magdaléna Borová, Stanislav Majer	Bontonfilm	Historical drama	135 Minutes	
Stockholm Syndrome	Dan Svátek	David Švehlík	Česká televize	Crime Thriller	148 Minutes	
The Pack	Tomas Polensky	Tomáš Dalecký	Bontonfilm	Sport Drama	95 Minutes	
Princess Cursed in Time	Petr Kubík	Natália Germáni, Eliška Křenková, Marek Lambora	Bohemia MP	Fantasy	115 Minutes	
The Secret of Karma	Milan Friedrich	Brendan Fraser, Marcia Cross		Mysterious Romantic Fantasy	90 Minutes	
A Too Personal Acquaintance	Marta Ferencová	Petra Hřebíčková, Eliška Balzerová	Bioscop	Comedy	107 Minutes	
2021
Bird Atlas	Olmo Omerzu	Miroslav Donutil	CinemArt	Drama	92 Minutes	
Even Mice Belong in Heaven	Jan Bubeníček, Denisa Grimmová		CinemArt	Animated adventure	87 Minutes	
Gump: The Dog That Taught People How to Live	F. A. Brabec	Boleslav Polívka	Bioscop	Adventure Family film	92 Minutes	Based on a book of the same name.
Jedině Tereza	Jaroslav Fuit	Veronika Khek Kubařová, Igor Orozovič	CinemArt	Romantic comedy	97 Minutes	
A Late Dinner	Michal Suchánek	Jiří Langmajer, Tatiana Dyková	Falcon a.s.	Comedy	86 Minutes	
Like summer snow	Lubomír Hlavsa	Alois Švehlík	Česká televize	Historical film	96 minutes	Based on life of Jan Amos Comenius
The Man With Hare Ears	Martin Šulík	Miroslav Krobot	Bioscop	Comedy	104 Minutes	
Mistakes	Jan Prušinovský	Pavla Gajdošíková, Jan Jankovský	Falcon	Romantic Comedy	101 Minutes	
The modern dad's diary	Jan Haluza	Jiří Mádl	CinemArt	Comedy	101 Minutes	
Mothers	Vojtěch Moravec	Hana Vagnerová, Petra Hřebíčková, Sandra Nováková	Bontonfilm	Comedy	95 Minutes	
My Sunny Maad	Michaela Pavlátová	Zuzana Stivínová, Hynek Čermák	Aerofilms	Animated	85 Minutes	
Occupation	Michal Nohejl	Aleksandr Gorbunov, Antonie Formanová	Bontonfilm	Comedy, Drama	97 Minutes	
Punch and Run	Adam Hobzik	Matouš Ruml	CinemArt	Crime Comedy	99 Minutes	
Shoky & Morthy: Last Big Thing	Andy Fehu	Štěpán Kozub, Jakub Štáfek	Falcon a.s.	Adventure, Comedy	103 Minutes	
Sleeping City	Dan Svátek	Anežka Novotná, Adam Svátek, Kryštof Svátek, Michaela Sodomková	Bontonfilm	Adventure, Thriller	93 Minutes	
Zátopek	David Ondříček	Václav Neužil	Falcon a.s.	Historical drama	130 Minutes	Based on life of Emil Zátopek.
2022
Arvéd	Vojtěch Mašek	Michal Kern	CinemArt	Mysterious psychological drama	120 minutes	Based on life of Jiří Arvéd Smíchovský.
BANGER.	Adam Sedlák	Adam Mišík	Bontonfilm	Musical Drama	105 minutes	
Bethlehem Night	Jan Svěrák	Zdeněk Svěrák	Bioscop	Comedy	100 minutes	
Big Opening	Miroslav Krobot	Pavel Šimčík	Falcon	Comedy, Drama	90 minutes	
Borders of Love	Tomasz Wiński	Hana Vagnerová, Matyáš Řezníček	Aerofilms	Erotic Drama	95 Minutes	
Buko	Alice Nellis	Anna Cónová, Martha Issová, Petra Špalková	CinemArt	Comedy, Drama	112 minutes	
A Christmas Story	Irena Pavlásková	Karel Roden, Jiřina Bohdalová	CinemArt	Comedy	105 minutes	
The Enchanted Cave	Mariana Čengel Solčanská	Martina Zábranská, Ondřej Kraus	CinemArt	Fantasy	102 minutes	
Emergency Situation	Jiří Havelka	Jana Plodková, Jaroslav Plesl	Cinemart	Drama, Comedy	102 minutes	
Female Factor	Miloslav Šmídmajer	Hana Vagnerová, Alžbeta Stanková, Marek Němec	Falcon	Romantic Comedy	108 minutes	
Grand Prix	Jan Prušinovský	Robin Ferro, Kryštof Hádek, Štěpán Kozub	Falcon	Comedy	107 minutes	
Hádek Family	Vojtěch Moravec	Sandra Nováková, Jakub Prachař, Jitka Čvančarová, Hynek Čermák, Ondřej Pavelka	Bontonfilm	Comedy	95 minutes	
The Head of the Tribe	Tomáš Svoboda	Karel Roden	Bioscop	Comedy	94 minutes	
Heart to Heart	Martin Horský	Bolek Polívka, Eliška Balzerová	CinemArt	Comedy	95 minutes	
Il Boemo	Petr Václav	Vojtěch Dyk	Pilot Film	Historical	130 Minutes	Based on the life and career of the Czech composer Josef Mysliveček.
Joint Custody	Petr Nikolaev	Jitka Čvančarová, Martin Hofmann	Bontonfilm	Comedy	88 minutes	
Journey to Yourland	Peter Budinský		Forum Film CZ	Animated adventure	86 minutes	
Krakonošovo tajemství	Peter Bebjak	David Švehlík, Leona Skleničková	Czech television	Fairy Tale	99 Minutes	
The Last Race	Tomáš Hodan	Kryštof Hádek, Vladimír Pokorný	Bontonfilm	Historical sport film	100 minutes	
Madam President	Rudolf Havlík	Aňa Geislerová, Ondřej Vetchý	Bioscop	Romantic Comedy	97 minutes	
Medieval	Petr Jákl	Ben Foster	Bioscop	Action Historical film	125 minutes	Most expensive Czech film. Based on life of Jan Žižka.
Nightline	Robert Sedláček	Karel Roden	Bontonfilm	Thriller	95 minutes	
The Old Blunderbuss Mystery 2	Ivo Macharáček	Ondřej Vetchý, Tomáš Klus, Veronika Khek Kubařová	Bioscop	Fairy Tale	104 Minutes	Sequel to The Old Blunderbuss Mystery
Ordinary Failures	Cristina Groșan	Taťjana Medvecká, Beata Kaňoková, Vica Kerekes	Bontonfilm	Drama	85 minutes	
Párty Hárder: Summer Massacre	Martin Pohl	Daniel Žáček Adam Ernest Jakub Kalián	Bontonfilm	Comedy	100 minutes	Sequel to 2019 film Párty Hárd.
Prince Mama's Boy	Jan Budař	Jan Budař, Ondřej Vetchý, Martin Huba	Bontonfilm	Adventure Fairy Tale	100 minutes	
Princess Cursed in Time: Alchemist's Quest	Petr Kubík	Natalia Germani, Eliška Křenková, Marek Lambora	Bohemia MP	Fantasy	134 Minutes	Sequel to Princess Cursed in Time.
Perfect Strangers	Zuzana Marianková	Tatiana Pauhofová, Klára Issová	CinemArt	Comedy	103 minutes	Czech remake of Perfect Strangers.
Piargy	Zuzana Marianková	Judit Bárdos	CinemArt	Historical Drama	100 minutes	Coproduction with Slovakia.
Saving One Who Was Dead	Václav Kadrnka	Vojtěch Dyk, Zuzana Mauréry	Cinemart	Drama	90 minutes	
Say It by Dog	Robert Sedláček	Berenika Kohoutová	CinemArt	Romantic Comedy	85 minutes	
Shadowplay	Peter Bebjak	Milan Ondrík	Falcon	Crime thriller	103 minutes	
Somewhere Over the Chemtrails	Adam Koloman Rybanský	Miroslav Krobot, Michal Isteník	Bontonfilm	Comedy	84 minutes	
Three Tigers in the movie: Jackpot	Emil Křižka	Albert Čuba, Štěpán Kozub	Bontonfilm	Action Comedy	110 minutes	Based on a comedy improvisational show Three Tigers.
Together	David Laňka, Martin Müller	Štěpán Kozub, Veronika Žilková, Kamila Janovičová	Bontonfilm	Psychological Drama	117 minutes	
V létě ti řeknu, jak se mám	Marta Ferencová	Tereza Kostková	Falcon	Comedy	117 minutes	
Victim	Michal Blaško	Vita Smačeljuk, Gleb Kuchuk	Bontonfilm	Drama	92 minutes	Slovak and German co-production.
Vyšehrad: Fylm	Martin Kopp, Jakub Štáfek	Jakub Štáfek	Falcon	Sport Comedy	103 minutes	Sequel to Vyšehrad TV series.
The Websters Movie	Katarína Kerekesová	Ivana Korolová, Adam Mišík	Bontonfilm	Animated	65 minutes	Coproduction with Slovakia.
The Word	Beata Parkanová	Martin Finger, Gabriela Mikulková	Bontonfilm	Drama	104 minutes	
What Men Want 2	Rudolf Havlík	Jiří Langmajer, Anna Polívková,	CinemArt	Comedy	95 minutes	Sequel to What Men Want.
When the Lion Roars	Jan E. Svatoš	František Němec	Art Francesco	Adventure Historical Documentary	100 minutes	
2023
#annaismissing	Pavel Soukup	Alexandra Vostrejžová, Viktorie Vítová, Marek Němec	Aerofilms	Thriller	108 Minutes	Spiritual sequel to #martyisdead
Bastardi: Reparát	Tomáš Magnusek	Tomáš Magnusek, Zdeněk Godla	Bioscop	Drama	86 Minutes	Fourth installment in Bastardi film series.
Be the Man	Michal Samir	Jakub Prachař, Tereza Ramba	Bioscop	Adventure Comedy	96 Minutes	
Birthday Wishes	Marta Ferencová	Eva Holubová, Jaroslav Dušek, Veronika Khek Kubařová, Tomáš Klus, Igor Orozovič,	Bioscop	Comedy	93 Minutes	
The Body	Natálie Císařovská	Natalia Germani	Bontonfilm	Sport drama	108 Minutes	Based on life of the real story of Andrea Absolonová.
Brothers	Tomáš Mašín	Oskar Hes, Jan Nedbal	CinemArt	Action drama	135 Minutes	Based on story of Josef and Ctirad Mašín.
Brutal Heat	Albert Hospodářský	Vincent Hospodářský	Artcam Films	Drama	75 Minutes	
The Chambermaid	Mariana Čengel Solčanská	Dana Droppová, Radka Caldová	CinemArt	Historical Romantic Drama	110 Minutes	Coproduction with Slovakia.
Cool Girl!	Jeremy Tichý	Anna Šulcová, Dominique Alagia, Kristal Shine	Donart Film	Comedy Drama	97 Minutes	
Dad against his will	Tomáš Dianiška	Kryštof Hádek, Kristína Svarinská	Bontonfilm	Romantic COmedy	90 Minutes	
Electra	Daria Kashcheeva	Zuzana Částková		Drama	27 Minutes	
Eclipse	Petr Kubík	Jakub Štáfek	Bohemia MP	Comedy Thriller	85 Minutes	
The Exhale	Tomáš Mašín	Jana Plodková, Marián Mitaš	Donart Film	Crime Drama	107 Minutes	
The Great Nothing	Vít Klusák, Marika Pecháčková		Bioscop	Documentary	103 Minutes	
The Green Border	Agnieszka Holland	Jalal Altawil, Maja Ostaszewska	Bioscop	Drama	147 Minutes	Coproduction film.
How to survive your husband	Rudolf Merkner	Jana Bernášková, Marek Němec	Falcon	Comedy	90 Minutes	
Into the Darkness	Jiří Svoboda	Matěj Hádek, Lucie Štěpánková	Czech Television	Crime Drama	80 Minutes	
Island	Rudolf Havlík	Jiří Langmajer, Jana Plodková	CinemArt	Adventure Romantic Comedy	100 Minutes	
The Killing of a Journalist	Matt Sarnecki	Bontonfilm	Bontonfilm	Documentary	102 Minutes	
The Man Who Stood in the Way	Petr Nikolaev	Tomáš Töpfer	Bio Illusion	Historical drama	120 Minutes	Based on life of František Kriegel.
The Meaning and Mystery of Life	Petr Vachler	Jan Budař, Josef Polášek, Barbora Seidlová	Falcon	Animated Mysterious Drama	153 Minutes	Production took 10 years.
Nagano Kids	Dan Pánek	Hynek Čermák, Klára Issová	Bontonfilm	Family Sport film	98 Minutes	
ONEMANSHOW: The Movie	Kamil Bartošek, Andy Fehu	Kamil Bartošek	Bontonfilm	Action Crime Comedy	100 Minutes	Based on a web show One Man Show.
Restore Point	Robert Hloz	Andrea Mohylová, Matěj Hádek	Bioscop	Science Fiction Crime	111 Minutes	
A Sensitive Person	Tomáš Klein	David Prachař	CinemArt	Comedy	120 Minutes	
She Came at Night	Jan Vejnar, Tomáš Pavlíček	Simona Peková, Annette Nesvadbová, Jiří Rendl,	Artcam Films	Comedy, Horror	85 Minutes	
Snake Gas	David Jařab	Stanislav Majer	CinemArt	Drama	112 Minutes	
Terezin	Gabriele Guidi	Mauro Conte, Dominika Morávková-Zeleníková	Bohemia MP	Romantic war drama	100 Minutes	Coproduction with Italy.
Tony, Shelly and the Magic Light	Filip Pošivač	Michael Polák, Antonie Barešová	CinemArt	Animated adventure	80 Minutes	Won Contrechamps category award at Annecy International Animation Film Festival.
Two Words as the Key	Dan Svátek	David Švehlík, Ivan Franěk,	Bontonfilm	Drama	100 Minutes	Loose sequel to The Smiles of Sad Men
Waltzing Matilda	Petr Slavík	Karel Roden, Regina Rázlová	Bontonfilm	Drama	113 Minutes	
We're Going to Team Building	Zuzana Marianková	Jakub Prachař, Anna Polívková, Vojtěch Kotek	CinemArt	Comedy	105 Minutes	
We Have Never Been Modern	Matěj Chlupáček	Eliška Křenková	Bontonfilm	Crime drama	117 Minutes	
White Lie	Tomáš Dianiška	Kryštof Hádek	Bontonfilm	Romantic Comedy	90 Minutes	
2024
Big Man	Radek Beran	Saša Rašilov	A-Company CZ	Animated adventure	72 Minutes	Sequel to The Little Man.
Bloody Johann	Jakub Krumpoch	Marek Holý	Bontonfilm	Horror	90 Minutes	
Czechoslovak Architecture 58-89	Jan Zajíček		Aerofilms	Documentary	126 Minutes	
Dry Season	Bohdan Sláma	Martin Pechlát, Marek Daniel	Bioscop	Drama	112 Minutes	
The End of the World	Bohdan Sláma	Miroslav Krobot, Vojtěch Veverka	Cinemart	Family Drama	134 Minutes	
Forest Killer	Radim Špaček	Michal Balcar	Vernes	Crime Drama	78 Minutes	About Viktor Kalivoda.
The Gardener's Year	Jiří Havelka	Oldřich Kaiser	Donart Film	Comedy Drama	103 Minutes	
Girl America	Viktor Tauš	Pavla Beretová, Julie Šoucová, Klára Kitto,	Bioscop	Fantasy drama	110 Minutes	
The Grand Finale of PSO	Dominik Kalivoda		Alter Vision	Musical Documentary	92 Minutes	
Gump: We are Duo	F. A. Brabec	Boleslav Polívka	Bioscop	Adventure Family film	86 Minutes	Sequel to Gump: The Dog That Taught People How to Live
Her Drunken Diary	Dan Svátek	Tereza Ramba	Bontonfilm	Drama	92 Minutes	
Holiday on Four Wheels	Jiří Matoušek	Barbora Poláková, Lukáš Příkazký	Bontonfilm	Comedy	87 Minutes	
Havel Speaking, Can You Hear Me?	Petr Jančárek	Václav Havel	Continental film	Documentary	86 Minutes	About Václav Havel.
The Hungarian Dressmaker	Iveta Grófová	Alexandra Borbély, Milan Ondrík, Nico Klimek	Pilot Film	War Drama	129 Minutes	Minority coproduction with Slovakia
I Don't Love You Anymore	Zdeněk Jiráský	Daniel Zeman, Maisha Romera Kollmann	Continental Film	Road Movie	110 Minutes	
JAVARI	Miroslav Haluza	Miroslav Haluza, Simon Pelikán	Bontonfilm	Adventure Documentary	53 Minutes	
Karlos	Michal Samir	Karlos Vemola	Bontonfilm	Sport Documentary	87 Minutes	About Karlos Vémola.
The Last Aristocrat 2	Jiří Vejdělek	Hynek Čermák, Tatiana Dyková, Yvona Stolařová	Falcon	Comedy	99 Minutes	
Limits of Europe	Apolena Rychlíková	Saša Uhlová	Pilot Film	Documentary	98 Minutes	
Living Large	Kristina Dufková	Hugo Kovács, Tatiana Dyková	Aerofilms	Animated	80 Minutes	
Love to Order	Eva Toulová	Eva Toulová	Bontonfilm	Romantic Comedy	82 Minutes	
Mr. and Mrs. Stodola	Petr Hátle	Lucie Žáčková, Jan Hájek	CinemArt	Crime drama	107 Minutes	About serial killers Jaroslav and Dana Stodolovi.
March to May	Martin Pavol Repka	Zuzana Fialová, Jozef Abafi	Perfilm	Drama	85 Minutes	
Once Upon a Princess	Martina Adamcová	Jasmína Houf	CinemArt	Fairy Tale	83 Minutes	
Our Lovely Pig Slaughter	Karel Martinec, Miloslav Čížek, Pavlína Balner	Oldřich Kaiser	Cinemart	Comedy Drama	85 Minutes	
Proud Princess	Radek Beran, David Lisý	Marek Lambora, Anna Fialová	Cinemart	Animated Fairy Tale	84 Minutes	Animated remake of The Proud Princess.
Runaway Mum	Hana Hendrychová	Petra Hřebíčková, Lenka Dolanská Vlasáková	Falcon	Comedy	95 Minutes	
The Sweet Life	Tomáš Hoffman	Vladimír Polívka, Petra Hřebíčková	CinemArt	Romantic Comedy	101 Minutes	
Space Frank	Rudolf Havlík	Jakub Prachař	CinemArt	Sci-fi Comedy	101 Minutes	
State of Emergency	Jan Hřebejk	Ondřej Vetchý	Falcon	Comedy	100 Minutes	
Tiny Lights	Beata Parkanová	Mia Bankó	Bontonfilm	Drama	74 Minutes	
Toxic	Štefan Voržáček	Tadeáš Hubálek, Denisa Kršková	Bioscop	Drama	97 Minutes	
Treasure	Rudolf Havlík	Jiří Langmajer, Veronika Khek Kubařová	Cinemart	Adventure Comedy	100 Minutes	
Waves	Jiří Mádl	Vojtěch Vodochodský, Tomáš Maštalír, Táňa Pauhofová	Bontonfilm	Thriller	131 Minutes	
Whirlwind	Peter Bebjak	Anna Geislerová, Tomáš Maštalír	Bontonfilm	Thriller	122 Minutes	Minority coproduction with Slovakia
Year of the Widow	Veronika Lišková	Pavla Beretová	CinemArt	Drama	108 Minutes	
2025
All the Good Deeds	Jan Těšitel	Kristýna Ryška, Kryštof Hádek	Falcon	Crime Thriller	90 Minutes	
Another Round	Rudolf Biermann	Hana Vagnerová, Judit Pecháček, Alžbeta Ferencová	CinemArt	Comedy Drama	119 Minutes	Remake of Another Round
Broken Voices	Ondřej Provazník	Juraj Loj, Kateřina Falbrová	CinemArt	Drama	106 Minutes	It was released on 6 July at the KVIFF, where it competed for the Crystal Globe.
Caravan	Zuzana Kirchnerová-Špidlová	Anna Geislerová	CinemArt	Drama	102 Minutes	
Do the Mæth	Marty Pohl	Jan Hofman, Marek Milko	Bontonfilm	Crime Comedy	99 Minutes	
Džob	Tomáš Vorel	Jiří Mádl, Tomáš Vorel jr.	Continental Film	Comedy, Drama	87 Minutes	Sequel to Vejška.
Fichtelberg	Šimon Koudela	Jan Dlouhý, Ondřej Stupka	CinemArt	Adventure	91 Minutes	
Franz	Agnieszka Holland	Idan Weiss	Bioscop	Drama	127 Minutes	About the life of Franz Kafka
Holka od vedle	Filip Oberfalcer	Martina Babišová, Adam Mišík, Kryštof Bartoš	Continental Film	Romantic Comedy	90 Minutes	
How Did This Happen to Us!?	Petr Zahrádka	Miroslav Donutil	Bohemia MP	Comedy	100 Minutes	
Řepka: Hříšník	Petr Větrovský	Tomáš Řepka	Bohemia MP	Sport Documentary	114 Minutes	About Tomáš Řepka.
Na horách	Rudolf Havlík	Aneta Krejčíková, Igor Orozovič	Donart Film	Adventure Romantic Comedy	117 Minutes	
Invincibles	Dan Pánek	Ivan Trojan, Hynek Čermák, Tomáš Havlínek	Falcon	Sport drama	118 Minutes	
Nobody Likes Me	Petr Kazda, Tomáš Weinreb	Rebeka Poláková, Mantas Zemleckas	Bontonfilm	Drama	105 Minutes	
Princess Goldenhair	Jan Těšitel	Marek Lambora, Tomáš Weber, Jasmína Houf	Bioscop	Fairy Tale	116 Minutes	
Sea of Hope	Martin Horský	Ondřej Vetchý, Jiří Langmajer	Bontonfilm	Comedy Drama	102 Minutes	
Secret Delivery	Ján Sebechlebský	Eliška Dytrychová, Theo Schaefer, Jakub Král, Judit Pecháček, Matěj Hádek	Cinemart	Adventure	97 Minutes	
Snare of Evil	Jan Haluza	Petr Uhlík, Ivan Lupták, Sabina Rojková	CinemArt	Horror	86 Minutes	
Summer School, 2001	Dušan Duong	Anh Doan Hoang, The Duong Bui	Aerofilms	Drama	102 Minutes	Described as the first Czech viet-film
Sugar Candy	Pavel Jandourek	Tereza Ramba, Marek Adamczyk	Bioscop	Adventure	115 Minutes	
Tony's Plan	Barbora Kočičková	Lukáš Duy Anh Tran	Falcon	Action Comedy	80 Minutes	
Vyšehrad Dvje	Martin Kopp, Jakub Štáfek	Jakub Štáfek	Bioscop	Sport Comedy	110 Minutes	Sequel to Vyšehrad: Fylm.
2026
Birthday Wishes 2	Marta Ferencová	Eva Holubová, Jaroslav Dušek, Matěj Hádek	Bioscop	Comedy	101 Minutes	Sequel to Birthday Wishes.
Born in the Jungle	Edmunds Jansons		CinemArt	Animated adventure film	72 Minutes	Coproduction with Latvia and Poland.
Chica Checa	Šimon Holý	Pavla Tomicová, Jan Cina, Erwan Kepoa Falé	Falcon a.s.	Comedy Drama	96 Minutes	
The Crystal Planet	Arsen Anton Ostojić	Jiří Lábus, Patricie Solaříková, Miroslav Táborský	Falcon	Animated adventure sci-fi	97 Minutes	Co-production with Croatia and Slovakia
The Cursed Warrior	Vojtěch Frič, Tomáš Dianiška	Milan Ondrík	Bontonfilm	Action sport drama	123 Minutes	
Dancing with the Bear	Jitka Rudolfová	Pavla Gajdošíková, Kryštof Hádek	Bontonfilm	Drama	110 Minutes	
Dream Team	Jonáš Karásek	Martin Hofmann	CinemArt	Sport comedy	127 Minutes	
Five Plums	Jan Svěrák	Petr Kostka, Oldřich Kaiser, Lenka Termerová, Dana Syslová, Jan Vlasák	Bioscop	Comedy	100 Minutes	
The General	Juraj Štepka	Ondrej Hraška	CinemArt	Historical War Drama		Minority coproduction with Slovakia. Film about General Ján Golian.
Gregorius, the Chosen One	Tomasz Mielnik	Jan František Uher	Artcam Films	Fantasy comedy	90 Minutes	
If Pigeons Turned to Gold	Pepa Lubojacki	David Richter	CLAW films	Documentary	110 Minutes	
Little Thief	Ondřej Hudeček	Matyáš Řezníček	Bontonfilm	Crime comedy	118 Minutes	
Lone Wolf	Ondřej Veverka	Tadeáš Moravec	Falcon	Documentary War Drama	94 Minutes	Film about Josef František, the highest-scoring non-British Allied ace in the Battle of Britain.
The Princess a Hundred Times Otherwise	Miloslav Šmídmajer	Filip Březina, Ema Klangová Businská	Continental Film	Fairy tale film	120 Minutes	
Second Chances	Dan Pánek	Vladimír Polívka, Eva Podzimková	Donart Film	Romantic Comedy	107 Minutes	
Šviháci	Braňo Mišík	Martin Pechlát, Tomáš Jeřábek, Daniel Fischer	Bontonfilm	Comedy	118 Minutes	
Thankskilling Day	Petr Kubík, JC Kovář	Sára Korbelová, Vladimír Polívka, Ján Jackuliak	Bontonfilm	Horror	90 Minutes	
They Call Me Lars	Jaroslav Fuit	Martin Hofmann	CinemArt	Crime Thriller	113 Minutes	
Unexpected Summer	Milan Cieslar	Barbora Poláková, Jordan Haj	Falcon	Romantic Comedy	93 Minutes	
Ungrateful Beings	Olmo Omerzu	Barry Ward	CinemArt	Comedy Drama	110 Minutes	
War with the Salamanders	Aurel Klimt	Jaroslav Dušek, Petr Čtvrtníček, Robert Nebřenský	CinemArt	Adventure Sci-Fi		Adaptation of a novel War with the Newts by Karel Čapek
When Parents Turn Divine	Adam Hobzik, Jan Chramosta	Vica Kerekes, Petr Lněnička	Bontonfilm	Adventure Fantasy Comedy	103 Minutes	
When the Light Goes Out	Andy Fehu	Petra Hřebíčková, Tomáš Maštalír	Bontonfilm	Comedy	92 Minutes	
Wirbel	Tomáš Hubáček	David Švehlík, Judit Pecháček	Pilot Film	Mysterious	96 Minutes	
