= Emma Smetana =

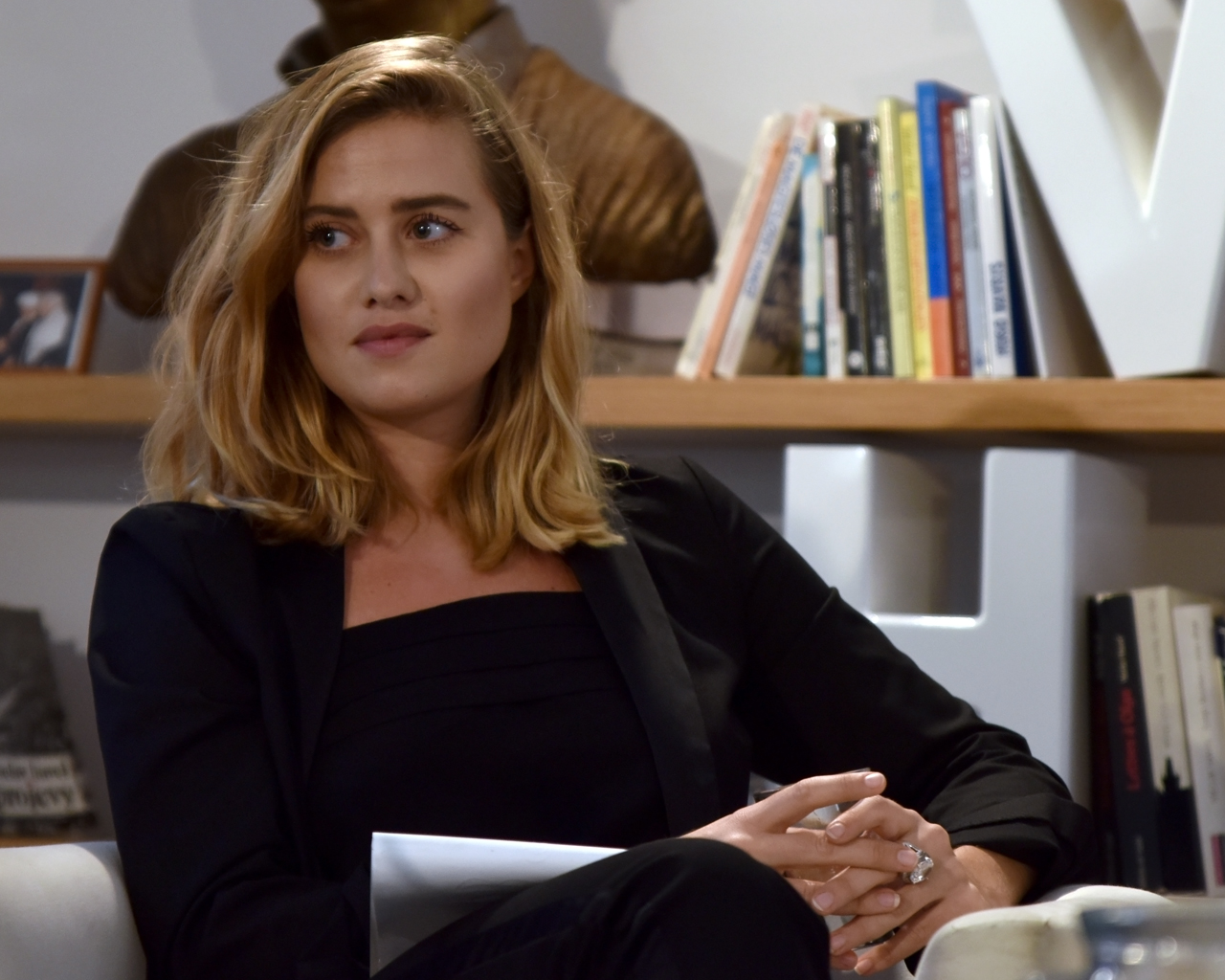
- Emma Smetana (2019)
- Born: Emma Smetanová; 11 February 1988 (age 38); Prague, Czechoslovakia
- Education: Sciences Po; Free University of Berlin
- Occupations: actress, singer, television presenter, journalist, political scientist
- Years active: 2008–present
- Partner: Jordan Haj (2008–present)
- Children: 2
- Relatives: Monika MacDonagh-Pajerová (mother); Kateřina Jacques (aunt); Jan Roth (great-great-grandfather)

Emma Smetana (officially in the Czech Republic Smetanová; born 11 February 1988) is a Czech actress, singer, television presenter, journalist and political scientist.

== Work ==
From 2012 to 2016, Smetana read the news for Czech television channel TV Nova.

From 2017 to 2020, she was interviewer for Czech internet television channel DVTV.

== Selected filmography ==
=== Films ===
- Europe je t'aime (2008), amateur film
- Rytmus v patách (2009) – Lizetka
- Men in Hope (2011) – Bára
- The Don Juans (2013) – Barborka, granddaughter of Markéta
- Colette (2013) – Hannah
- Korunní princ (2015, TV film)
- Jedině Tereza (2021) – host

=== TV series ===
- Základka (2012)
- Crossing Lines (2013) – Aide
- Burning Bush (2013) – Hana Čížková
- Až po uši (2014)
- Na vodě (2016) – Sandra
- Eliška a Damián (2023) – Eliška Mlynářová

=== Theatre ===
- Lucie, větší než malé množství lásky (2013) – Lucie

== Discography ==
Studio albums

- What I've Done (2016)
- By Now (with Jordan Haj) (2022)

== Personal life ==
Smetana has two daughters, Lennon Marlene and Ariel Ava, with her partner, actor and musician Jordan Haj.
