= ONEMANSHOW: The Movie =

- Theatrical release poster
- Directed by: Kamil Bartošek; Andy Fehu
- Based on: One Man Show by: Kamil Bartošek; Markus Krug
- Starring: Kamil Bartošek
- Cinematography: Jakub Ševčík
- Edited by: Tomáš Lyga
- Distributed by: Bontonfilm
- Release date: 17 August 2023 (Czech Republic)
- Running time: 100 minutes
- Country: Czech Republic
- Language: Czech
- Budget: 72,000,000 CZK
- Box office: 100,533,536 CZK

ONEMANSHOW: The Movie is a 2023 Czech crime action comedy film directed by Kamil Bartošek AKA Kazma Kazmitch, and Andy Fehu. It is based on a web show called One Man Show.

The film was linked to a contest with possibility of winning a 22 million CZK, which viewers can enter after purchasing a ticket. It reportedly led some moviegoers to buy tickets repeatedly to increase their chances of winning. The film saw the largest drop in attendance between the first and second weekend since its release, by 79% for a film with a start of more than 100,000 viewers.

== Cast ==
- Kamil Bartošek as himself (Kazma)
- Adam Mašura as Steve
- Barbora Černá as Wendy
- Michael Vykus as Frank
- Tomáš Weber as Linuks
- Jan Hofman as Laco
- Kostas Zerdaloglu as Jaroslav Zvěřina
- Jiří Bartoška as himself
- Ondřej Sokol as himself
- Hynek Čermák as himself
- Jiří Langmajer as himself
- Kryštof Hádek as himself

== Production ==
The film was secretly in development since 2019. The film was announced in June 2023. On 27 June 2023 a war film called Tajný zákop (Secret Trench) was announced. It would be directed by Andy Fehu and star Jiří Langmajer, Hynek Čermák, Jiří Bartoška, Ondřej Sokol or Kryštof Hádek. It was to be presented on press conference during Karlovy Vary International Film Festival. It was revealed during the festival that Tajný zákop doesn't exist and only one scene was filmed and was used for ONEMANSHOW: The Movie.

== Release ==
The preview of the film took place on August 15, 2023, at the Cinema City cinema in the Westfield Chodov department store in Prague. It will premiere in Czech cinemas on August 17, 2023. Preview was attended some well known personalities such as Mayor of Řeporyje Pavel Novotný, MMA Fighter Karlos Vemola or lobbyist Ivo Rittig.

== Reception ==
Following the preview screening the film received negative reviews from critics. Kinobox lists 12 critics reviews of which 8 are negative and 3 mixed. One review doesn't include a rating.

=== Box office ===
The film had a record strong numbers in advance ticket sales and is set to be screened in around 280 Czech theatres by 20 August 2023 – the most in the Czech Republic so far. The film was viewed by record breaking 130,000 people and made 30 Million CZK on the first day. Eventually 290,000 people viewed the film during the first weekend. The film made 11,565,939 CZK during its second week meaning 79% drop, the worst drop between first and second week for any film in modern Czech history that was attended by more than 100,000 people during the first week.

== Controversy ==
The film drew controversy due to the contest for 22 Million CZK. Bartošek's former colleague Karel Ondrka condemned the film for encouraging gambling. Film columnist Kamil Fila pointed out the suspicious rules of the competition, in which the contestant acknowledges, for example, that he has no legal right to the payment of the prize and cannot enforce it in court, while the organizer reserves the right, at its discretion, to terminate, amend, extend or update.

Fortuna Game a bookmaker company that appears in the film, issued a request for public apology to the filmmakers noting "damage to the company's good name and reputation that occurred in connection with the public distribution and screening of the film," and sent filmmakers pre-trial summons shortly before the premiere.
