= Na vlnách Jadranu =

- Genre: Crime
- Written by: Lucie Paulová; Marta Fenclová
- Directed by: Vojtěch Moravec
- Starring: Matěj Hádek; Sebastian Cavazza; Natalia Germani
- Country of origin: Czech Republic; Slovakia
- Original languages: Czech; Slovak
- No. of seasons: 1
- No. of episodes: 6

Production
- Running time: 48-55 minutes

Original release
- Network: Prima televize TV JOJ
- Release: October 18 – November 22, 2023

Related
- Pod hladinou

Pod hladinou (On the Waves of the Adriatic) is a Czech-Slovak crime series broadcast from 10 January 2024 on TV Prima and TV JOJ. The series premiered on 18 October 2023 on the Prima+ platform JOJ Play. It is a sequel to the series Pod hladinou. Main characters are played by Natalia Germani and Matěj Hádek, who repeated the role of Jan Zach.

== Plot ==
Czech police officer and former diver Honza Zach, who comes to the Adriatic to close his past and becomes part of a team of Croatian and Czech police officers that solves cases related to the sea, coastal navigation and the marina, where strange thefts occur.

== Cast ==
- Matěj Hádek as Jan Zach
- Sebastian Cavazza as Zoran Perić
- Natalia Germani as Vesna
- Adam Ernest as Eda Vopěnka
- Maroš Kramár as Slávek Zavřel
- Sara Sandeva as Sandra Zavřelová
- Anna Šišková as Anna Zoričicová
