= Colette (2013 film) =

- Directed by: Milan Cieslar
- Starring: Jirí Mádl; Clémence Thioly
- Cinematography: Marek Jícha
- Music by: Atli Örvarsson
- Distributed by: Bioscop
- Release date: 12 September 2013 (Czech Republic)
- Running time: 126 minutes
- Countries: Czech Republic; Slovakia; Netherlands
- Language: English

Colette, also released under the name Prisoner of Auschwitz, is a 2013 English language Czech-Slovak-Dutch war film written and directed by Milan Cieslar and starring Jirí Mádl and Clémence Thioly. It is set in World War II and based on the Arnošt Lustig book, A girl from Antwerp.

== Plot ==
It is 1943 and Colette Cohen, a beautiful young Belgian-Jewish woman, is imprisoned in Auschwitz -Birkenau where she meets a fellow prisoner, Vili Feld, a Slovak-Jew, and they fall in love. They both experience the daily torture and slave labour in the camp, and one day Colette is selected for the gas chambers but is luckily saved by Vili, who tells her what to say so that she can avoid the sentence.

An SS official, Weisacker, who is captivated by her beauty, sends her to work as a seamstress at his manufactory, where she is granted a slight amount of protection in comparison to some other prisoners in the concentration camp. During her time, she falls more deeply in love with Vili and vice versa. They eventually decide that they are going to escape.

It is twenty-eight years since the war has ended. Vili, is now living in New York City, and recalls his relationship with Colette and the torture of their time in Auschwitz.

== Cast ==
- Clémence Thioly as Colette
- Jiří Mádl as Vili Feld
- Eric Bouwer as Weissacker
- Andrej Hryc as Fritz
- Zuzana Mauréry as Broderova
- Ondřej Vetchý as Elli
- Helena Dvořáková as Kordula
- Kristína Svarinská
- Juraj Adamík
- Jiří Bartoška as Old Vili (voice)
- Dan Brown
- Lubomir Burgr
- Václav Chalupa
- Jan Cina as Jeremiás
- Michal Dlouhý
- Jeremi Durand as François Platard (voice)
- Ivan Franěk
- Pavel Gajdoš
- Jordan Haj
- Robert Holik as Mourning Brother
- Juraj Hrcka
- Jitka Jackuliak
- Anna Kocicová
- Barbora Kodetová
- Ondrej Kovaľ
- Philipp Kraiczy
- Jakub Lorencovič as Sowa
- Denisa Pfauserová
- Elena Podzámska
- Kajetán Písarovic
- Balcárek Radek
- Eva Reiterová
- Sabina Rojková
- Pavel Rímský
- Emma Smetana
- Tomas Sotak
- Josef Tkác
- Miroslav Táborský
- Petr Vaněk

== See also ==
- List of Czech films of the 2010s
