= They Call Me Lars =

2026 Czech crime thriller film

- Directed by: Jaroslav Fuit
- Written by: Ivo Trajkov
- Based on: Říkají mi Lars by Daniel Gris
- Produced by: Petr Fořt
- Starring: Martin Hofmann; David Švehlík; Pavel Kikinčuk; Simona Peková; Justýna Zedníková
- Cinematography: Karel Fairaisl
- Music by: Jan Ponocný; Zdeněk Veselý; Karel Havlíček
- Distributed by: CinemArt
- Release date: 16 April 2026 (Czech Republic)
- Running time: 113 minutes
- Country: Czech Republic
- Language: Czech

They Call Me Lars (Czech: Říkají mi Lars) is a 2026 Czech crime thriller directed by Jaroslav Fuit. The screenplay for the film was written by Ivo Trajkov based on the book of the same name by Daniel Gris. The title character was played by Martin Hofmann, with other roles played by David Švehlík, Pavel Kikinčuk, Simona Peková and Justýna Zedníková.

The film was released in Czech cinemas on 16 April 2026.

== Plot ==
Unorthodox private investigator Lars (Martin Hofmann) receives a new job offer from his former partner and friend Gold (David Švehlík). Real estate mogul Leo (Pavel Kikinčuk) wants to secure compromising material on his wife Dora (Simona Peková) so he can divorce her and be with his lover Bonnie (Justýna Zedníková). Lars reluctantly agrees to the job, but his investigation sets off a risky game for many involved.

== Cast ==
- Martin Hofmann as David Scholl, private detective known as Lars
- David Švehlík as Gold, Lars' friend
- Pavel Kikinčuk as Leo Solomon, real estate tycoon
- Simona Peková as Dora Solomonová, Leo's wife
- Justýna Zedníková as Bonnie
- Marpo as a boxer
- Leoš Noha as Gregor, a bartender and hacker
- Jitka Sedláčková as brothel mom
- Jana Kolesárová as Gold's wife
- Maximilián Dolanský as Daniel
- Natália Germáni as policewoman and Lars' former lover
- Andrej Pachinger as Simjon, a money-lender
