= Přání k narozeninám =

2023 Czech comedy film

- Directed by: Marta Ferencová
- Written by: Marta Ferencová; Adam Dvořák
- Produced by: Adam Dvořák
- Starring: Eva Holubová; Veronika Khek Kubařová; Jaroslav Dušek
- Cinematography: Mário Ondriš; Adam Dvořák; David Rauch
- Edited by: Adam Dvořák
- Music by: James Harries
- Distributed by: Bioscop
- Release date: 19 January 2023
- Running time: 93 minutes
- Country: Czech Republic
- Language: Czech
- Box office: 31,877,157 CZK

Přání k narozeninám (English: Birthday Wishes) is a Czech comedy film directed by Marta Ferencová, released in 2023.

== Cast ==
- Veronika Khek Kubařová as Veronika Stránská, Lukáš' sister
- Eva Holubová as Libuška
- Jaroslav Dušek as Arnošt, Libuška's husband
- Igor Orozovič as Petr, Libuška's and Arnošt's son
- Tomáš Klus as Lukáš, Petr's boyfriend
- Matěj Hádek as Karel, Libuška's and Arnošt's son
- Simona Babčáková as Simona, Karel's wife
- David Švehlík as MUDr. David Stránský, Veronika's ex-husband
- Jaroslav Plesl as Ing. Richard Kvíčala, Veronika's boyfriend
- Jiří Maryško as police officer
- Jakub Uličník as controller
- Valentýna Bečková as Klára Stránská, Veronika's and David's daughter
- Jakub Barták as Jan Stránský, Veronika's and David's son
- Nico Klimek as Adam, Karel's and Simona's son
