= The Cursed Warrior =

- Directed by: Vojtěch Frič; Tomáš Dianiška
- Written by: Tomáš Dušička; Vojtěch Frič; Tomáš Dianiška
- Produced by: Vojtěch Frič; Jakub Eliášek; Ondřej Kulhánek; Martin Palán; Tibor Búza; Ondřej Novotný; Pavol Neruda
- Starring: Milan Ondrík; Hana Vagnerová; Eliška Balzerová; Martin Finger; Ján Jackuliak
- Cinematography: Martin Žiaran
- Edited by: Andy Fehu
- Music by: Michal Šupák
- Distributed by: Bontonfilm
- Release date: 13 August 2026 (Czech Republic)
- Running time: 127 minutes
- Countries: Czech Republic; Slovakia
- Language: Czech
- Budget: 70 Million CZK

The Cursed Warrior (Czech: Bojovník) is a Czech action sports drama film directed by Vojtěch Frič and Tomáš Dianiško. It is set to premiere on 13 August 2026. It will immerse the audience in the world of mixed martial arts. Milan Ondrík will play the lead role, with Hana Vagnerová, Eliška Balzerová, and Martin Finger appearing in other roles.

== Plot ==
Pavel Hoffmeister—known as "Hoff"—was once a European boxing champion and an Olympic medalist. Years after his retirement he receives an unexpected offer to face his opponent in MMA match. He must face new rules, grueling training, and an adversary who will put both his fitness and his character to the test. Yet, his toughest fight doesn't take place inside the cage. He must above all, confront himself and regain the trust of those closest to him.

== Cast ==
- Milan Ondrík as Pavel Hoffmeister AKA Hoff
- Ján Jackuliak as Kardos
- Hana Vagnerová as Marketa
- Martin Finger as David
- Ema Klangová Businská as Bára
- Eliška Balzerová as Ludmila
- Pavel Rímský as Ivan
- Jaroslav Plesl as Zdenál
- Kryštof Hádek as Čížek
- Ondřej Malý as Péťa
- David Matásek as Doctor Ferenc
- Adam Vacula as Jirka
- Mia Bankó as Zuzanka
- Marián Mitaš as Moros
- Jiří Vyorálek as Železný
