= Miroslav Vladyka =

Czech actor (born 1959)

- Born: 24 September 1959 (age 67); Prague, Czechoslovakia
- Occupations: Actor, TV presenter, voice actor

Miroslav Vladyka (born 24 September 1959) is a Czech actor, TV presenter and voice actor.

== Early life and career ==
Miroslav Vladyka was born on 24 September 1959 in Prague. He made his acting debut at the age of just five, in Káťa a krokodýl (1965) directed by Věra Plívová-Šimková. In 1982, he graduated from the Department of Dramatic Theatre at the Academy of Performing Arts, Prague.

From 1982, Vladyka was employed in the Vinohrady Theatre. In 1996–2002, he played in the Studio Ypsilon Theatre. Since 2002, he has been a freelance actor, performing in various Prague theatres, including the Vinohrady Theatre, Studio Ypsilon Theatre, Studio Dva Theatre and Na Jezerce Theatre.

From the 1980s, Vladyka was often cast in small film roles. He often appears in comedic roles in both theatre and film. In the 1990s, he became popular for hosting the Czech Television entertainment show Šance alongside Josef Dvořák. He also collaborated with the Czech Television on a number of other entertainment and documentary programs. He occasionally works as a voice actor, and among his most famous voice roles is Cat in the TV series Red Dwarf.

== Personal life and family ==
Vladyka is divorced and has two daughters and a son from the marriage. He lives in Prague.

== Selected filmography ==
- Křeček v noční košili (TV series; 1988)
- Slavné historky zbojnické (TV series; 1988)
- Josephine (2001)
- I'm All Good (2008)
- Doktor od jezera hrochů (2010)
- The Old Blunderbuss Mystery (2011)
- Goat Story 2 (voice; 2012)
- Stopy života (TV series; 2013)
- Případy 1. oddělení (TV series; 2014–2022)
- Všechny moje lásky (TV series; 2015–2016)
- Wasteland (TV series; 2016)
- The Defender (TV series; 2021)
- Dvojka na zabití (TV series; 2021–2024)
- The Old Blunderbuss Mystery 2 (2022)
