= Cirkus Bukowsky =

- Genre: Crime
- Starring: Pavel Řezníček; Hynek Čermák
- Country of origin: Czech Republic
- Original language: Czech
- No. of seasons: 2
- No. of episodes: 12

Production
- Running time: 53 minutes

Original release
- Network: Czech television
- Release: 2013 – 2014

Related
- Rapl

Cirkus Bukowsky is a Czech crime television series. It was directed by Jan Pachl, who also written the series in cooperation with Josef Viewegh.

== Description ==
The first six-part season followed thy style of a road movie, with main character psychologist Nestor Bukowsky. It premiered in 2013. The Second season focussed on Lieutenant Kuneš.

The series is in the dark style of modern Nordic crime fiction with a slower pace of action. The two seasons of the show are primarily connected by the title character of the criminal investigator Lieutenant Kuneš, who in the second season continues to work with the other main character, Nestor Bukowsky, when new facts emerged in the case of the murder of young Edita Tichá.

In 2013, author Jan Pachl expressed his intention to film a criminal spin-off called Rapl with the main character Kuneš. Czech Television produced and broadcast the new series in 2016.

== Cast ==
- Pavel Řezníček as Nestor Bukowsky
- Hynek Čermák as Kuneš
- Marika Šoposká as Vesna
- Jan Vlasák as Srnka
- Bohumil Klepl as Zachar
- Predrag Bjelac as Luka Coltello
- Vanda Hybnerová as Andrea
- Adéla Petřeková as Edita Tichá
- Karel Dobrý as Hartman
- Štěpán Benoni as Miky Lébl
- Jana Pidrmanová as Pokorná
- Teresa Branna as Daria
- Matěj Hádek as Žďárský
- Šárka Vaculíková as Markéta
- Jiří Untermüller as cardiologist
- Lukáš Jůza as Tejc
- Petra Bojko as Zachová
- Barbora Mottlová as bank employee
- Jan Teplý ml. as expert
- Jiří Wohanka as pathologist
- Klára Cibulková as Kuneš' ex-wife
- Norbert Lichý as Čingy
- Barbora Mudrová as Markéta
