= Všechny moje lásky =

- Genre: Romantic comedy
- Written by: Rudolf Merkner
- Directed by: Johanna Steiger-Antošová
- Starring: Veronika Žilková
- Country of origin: Czech Republic
- Original language: Czech
- No. of seasons: 2
- No. of episodes: 28

Production
- Running time: 55 minutes

Original release
- Network: Prima televize
- Release: September 9 – December 23, 2018

Všechny moje lásky (All My Loves) is a Czech romantic television series that was broadcast by Prima televize from 2015 to 2016. The story is about widow Marie Svobodová, who starts a new life after being fired from her job. The main role was played by Veronika Žilková.

The series has twenty-eight episodes. Twenty episodes aired in 2015 and the remaining eight premiered in summer of 2016.

== Cast ==
- Veronika Žilková as Marie Svobodová
- Mahulena Bočanová as Líza Tobiášová
- Monika Zoubková as Zuzana Matějková
- Jan Šťastný as Jiří Zábranský
- Stanislav Majer as Patrik Tobiáš
- Roman Vojtek as Lukáš Matějka
- Jana Bernášková as Anežka Stuchlíková
- Jan Hrušínský as mayor Karel Čeněk
- Miluše Šplechtová as Zdena Zábranská
- Karel Heřmánek as Miroslav Svoboda
- Veronika Khek Kubařová as Míša Svobodová
- Libuše Švormová as Alice Baroková
- Miroslav Vladyka as Ota Barok
- Zdeněk Piškula as Oliver Tobiáš
- Agáta Zimová as Sabina Tobiášová
- Aleš Bílík as Viktor Prouza
- Štěpán Benoni as Dominik Koucký
- Roman Luknár as Petr Kafka
- David Prachař as David Kocourek
- Dalibor Gondík as František Motýl
- Lucie Zedníčková as Marta Motýlová
- Jiří Štěpnička as Pavel Fišer
- Ilona Svobodová as Jana Tománková
- Pavlína Mourková as Vlaďka Špačková
- Radek Valenta as supervisor Tomáš
- Tomáš Jeřábek as chef Slavíček
- Václav Jílek as Adam Liška
- Ondřej Havel as Petr Šťastný
- Jakub Gottwald as Štěpán Zapletal
