= Josephine (2001 film) =

2001 film by Rajko Grlić

- Directed by: Rajko Grlić
- Written by: Koraljka Meštrović; Rajko Grlić (story); Alex Königsmark (story)
- Starring: Maria Schrader; Giancarlo Esposito; Miroslav Vladyka; Marina Anna Eich; Sophie Adell; Tery Ferman
- Cinematography: Slobodan Trninić
- Edited by: Andrija Zafranović; Marco Pav D'Auria
- Production companies: Motovun Film Festival; Indigo Filmproduktion; Fame Film & Music Entertainment; Bride Films
- Release date: 2001
- Running time: 97 minutes
- Country: Croatia
- Language: English

Josephine is a 2001 English-language Croatian film directed by Rajko Grlić. It was shown at several international film festivals in 2001, but was never released to theatres as the production company filed for bankruptcy during the film's post-production.

== Plot ==
Jan (Miroslav Vladyka) is a poor but knowledgeable Czech cheesemaker. In 1991, the borders of Czechoslovakia are opened, and Jan goes west to fulfill his father's dream, which is to meet and sleep with a girl who resembles Josephine Baker. He arrives in Hamburg, where he ends up being forced to live in a brothel owned by formed actor Spike (Giancarlo Esposito), and falls in love with East German dancer Al (Maria Schrader).

== Cast ==
- Miroslav Vladyka as Jan
- Maria Schrader as Al
- Giancarlo Esposito as Spike
- Tery Ferman as Josephine
- Marina Anna Eich as dancer
- Shahina Williams as Pep
- Andrea Bozó as Ninel

== Release ==
Indigo, the film's German production company, went bankrupt during post-production; hence, Josephine was never shown in theatres. The only screening of the film in Croatia was at the 2002 Motovun Film Festival, to an indifferent reception from the critics. According to Grlić, another German film company managed to acquire the rights to distribute the film in 2010. In the interim, he states that the film was shown (in breach of copyright laws) at many film festivals throughout the world.
