= Rédl =

- Genre: Crime, Thriller
- Directed by: Jan Hřebejk
- Starring: Ondřej Sokol
- Country of origin: Czech Republic
- Original language: Czech
- No. of seasons: 1
- No. of episodes: 4

Production
- Producer: Kateřina Ondřejková
- Running time: 80 minutes

Original release
- Network: ČT1
- Release: November 11 – December 2, 2018

Rédl is a 2018 Czech crime miniseries directed by Jan Hřebejk. It stars Ondřej Sokol as a Military Prosecutor Roman Rédl.

The series depicts atmosphere in a society that complexly seeks to deal with its past. The plot is set in the era of the division of Czechoslovakia: At the end of 1992, military prosecutor Roman Rédl (Ondřej Sokol) fights organized crime against the background of the withdrawal of Soviet troops from Eastern Europe.

The author of the original of this fictional story is screenwriter Miro Šifra. He connected real events in the story: the trial of General Aloiz Lorenz (named Lt. Gen. Josef Ferenc in the series) and the withdrawal of Soviet troops from territory of East Germany through Czechoslovakia. The series was introduced on 5 November 2018 and premiered from 11 November to 2 December 2018 on ČT1; was a great success, was awarded at two festivals and received a nomination for the Czech Lion awards.

== Plot ==
Czechoslovakia 1992; the communist regime has recently fallen and the Soviet occupation army is hastily withdrawing back to Eastern Europe. Wagons leaving the country are crammed with weapons, spare parts, ammunition and other valuables. Two young students, testing a new railway tracking system, discover that some Soviet wagons are inexplicably disappearing from the registers on their way. Both men decide to get to the bottom of the problem. A few days later, one of them is found dead and the other is believed to be on the run. Lieutenant Roman Rédl and a team of investigators are trying to find out what was the reason for the murder and how far the threads of the crime extend knowing it may cross the borders of Czechoslovakia and lead somewhere far to the east.

== Cast ==
- Ondřej Sokol as Rédl
- David Novotný as Karel
- Martin Hofmann as Jiří
- Roman Polák as General Ferenc
- Petra Hřebíčková as Ivana
- Michal Isteník as Prosecutor Štift
- Martin Pechlát as Prosecutor Navara
- Kryštof Bartoš as Petr Boček
- Oskar Hes as Jan Frim ml.
- Ján Sedal as Jan Frim st.
- Mária Pavlová as Hana Javornická
- Zuzana Ščerbová as Lenka Richtrová
- Naďa Kovářová as Judge Císařovská
- Helena Šulcová as Jiřina Navarová

== Episodes ==
No.	Title	Directed by	Written by	Original release date	Czech viewers (millions)
1	"Prokurátor (Prosecutor)"	Jan Hřebejk	Miro Šifra	November 11, 2018	0.841
2	"Komu se dá věřit? (Who can be trusted?)"	Jan Hřebejk	Miro Šifra	November 18, 2018	0.625
3	"Ivana"	Jan Hřebejk	Miro Šifra	November 25, 2018	0.667
4	"Děs (Nightmare)"	Jan Hřebejk	Miro Šifra	December 2, 2018	0.665
