= Limity =

2025 Czech comedy TV series

- Genre: Comedy
- Written by: Petr Zelenka
- Directed by: Petr Zelenka
- Starring: Aleš Háma
- Country of origin: Czech Republic
- Original language: Czech
- No. of seasons: 1
- No. of episodes: 8

Production
- Running time: 53–60 minutes

Original release
- Network: Czech Television
- Release: January 12 – March 2, 2025

Limity is a Czech comedy TV series. It was broadcast by Czech Television on the ČT1 channel from 12 January 2025 to 2 March 2025. The series was directed by Petr Zelenka, who also wrote the script.

== Plot ==
The main character is the co-owner of a waste disposal company, Karel (Aleš Háma), who is not exactly environmentally focused. Other characters are his son Igor (Maxmilián Dolanský), his wife Lenka (Veronika Khek Kubařová), who is having an affair with environmental activist Marek (Ondřej Brousek), and Max's ex-wife and mother, Alena (Tatiana Dyková).

== Cast ==
- Aleš Háma as Karel
- Maxmilián Dolanský as Igor
- Veronika Khek Kubařová as Lenka
- Ondřej Brousek as Marek
- Jaroslav Plesl as Jarda
- Pavla Beretová as Pavla
- Tatiana Dyková as Alena
- Lenka Netušilová as Jana
- Petr Komínek as Tomáš
- Romana Widenková as Kateřina
- Samuel Toman as Mikuláš
- Marek Daniel as Koutecký
- Petr Buchta as Peters
- Radim Novák as Lachtan

== Episodes ==
No.	Title	Directed by	Written by	Original release date	Czech viewers (millions)
1	"Azbest"	Petr Zelenka	Petr Zelenka	January 12, 2025	1.355
2	"Konec uhlí"	Petr Zelenka	Petr Zelenka	January 19, 2025	1.088
3	"Zrození hrdiny"	Petr Zelenka	Petr Zelenka	January 26, 2025	1.015
4	"Hořící muž"	Petr Zelenka	Petr Zelenka	February 2, 2025	0.907
5	"Marta"	Petr Zelenka	Petr Zelenka	February 9, 2025	0.889
6	"Sponzorský dar"	Petr Zelenka	Petr Zelenka	February 16, 2025	0.831
7	"Uhlí je kámoš"	Petr Zelenka	Petr Zelenka	February 23, 2025	0.744
8	"Jedno procento"	Petr Zelenka	Petr Zelenka	March 2, 2025	0.852
