= Ulice =

Czech soap opera

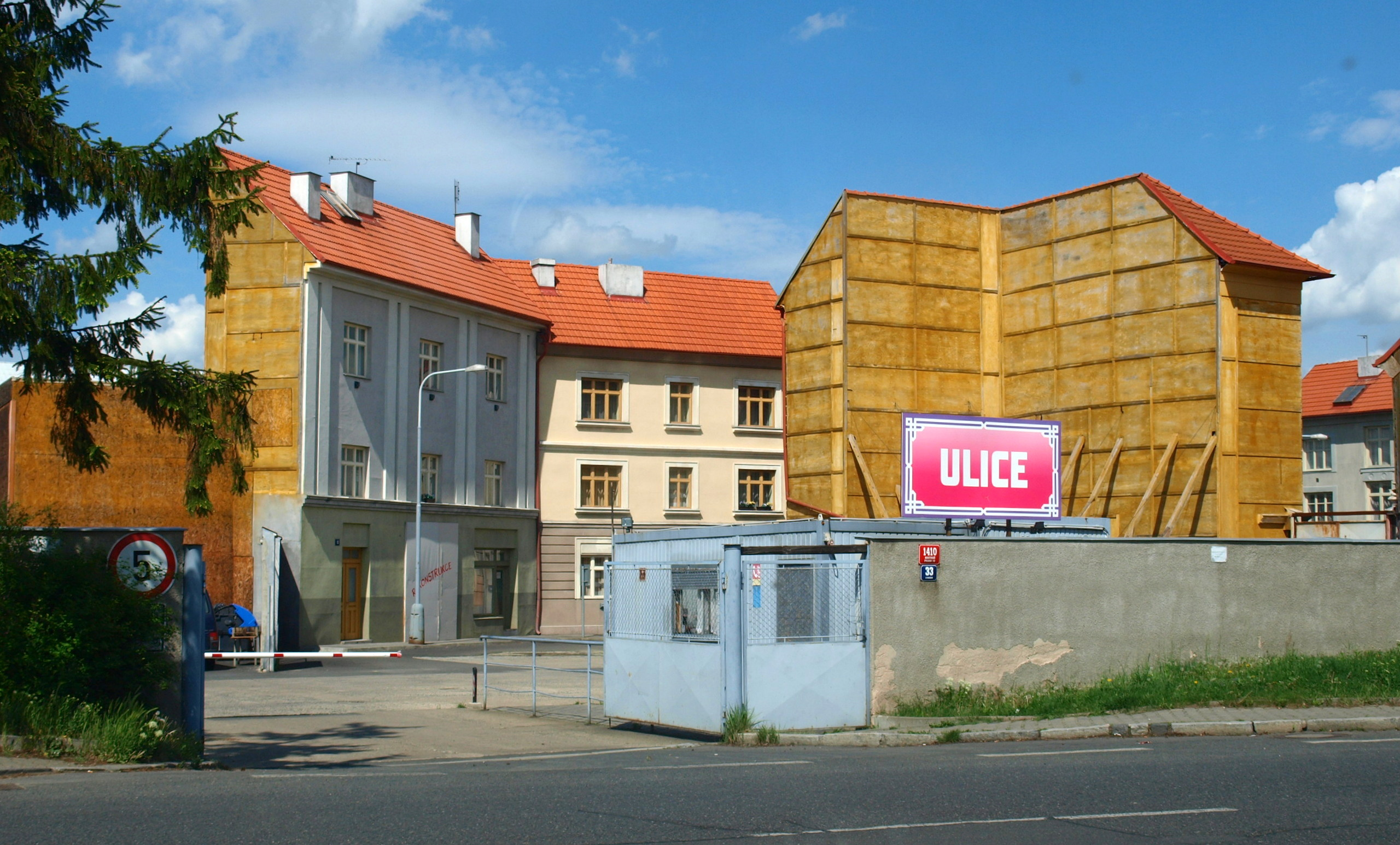
- Scenes for filming the series in Prague-Hostivař
- Genre: Soap opera
- Country of origin: Czech Republic
- No. of seasons: 20
- No. of episodes: 4,843

Production
- Running time: 43 minutes (excluding advertisements)
- Production company: TV Nova

Original release
- Network: Nova
- Release: 2 September 2005 – present

Ulice (lit. '[The] Street') is a Czech soap opera produced by Nova. It is aired five times a week.

The show describes the lives of the Farský, Jordán, Boháč, Nykl, Liška and Maléř families and many other people that live in Prague. Their daily battle against real problems of living in a modern world like divorce, love, betrayal, drug addiction, gay rights, and illness or disease. Ulice often shows crime (for example a group of Ukrainian mafia, assassination of mafia boss Ševčenko, stalking by Mr. Kukačka).

== Cast ==
- Václav Svoboda as Lumír Nykl
- Rudolf Hrušínský jr. as Vlastimil Pešek
- Ilona Svobodová as Jitka Farská
- Daniel Brown as Henry Rettig
- Ljuba Krbová as Anna Málková-Lišková
- Martin Hofmann as Jaroslav Hejl
- Jaroslava Obermaierová as Vilma Nyklová
- Zdena Hadrbolcová as Růžena Habartová
- Tereza Bebarová as Světlana Lisečko-Nyklová
- Jakub Štáfek as Matěj Jordán
- Petr Vacek as Tomáš Jordán
- Aneta Krejčíková as Gabriela Pumrová
- Patricie Solaříková as Tereza Jordánová
- Anna Fixová as Monika Farská
- Ondřej Pavelka as Oldřich Farský
- Jana Birgusová as Lída Farská-Kostková
- Pavla Tomicová as Simona Bláhova-Hložánková
- Michaela Badinková as Lenka Drápalová-Hejlová
- Hana Maciuchová as Miriam Hejlová
- Michaela Maurerová as Dagmar 'Digi' Bendová
- Tereza Brodská as Bára Jordánová
- Adrian Jastraban as Bedřich Liška
- Šárka Ullrichová as Zuzana Hrubá
- Pavel Kříž as Petr Boháč
- Jana Švandová as Zdena Čistá
- Ondřej Brzobohatý as Marek Stránský
- Roman Vojtek as Hynek Urban
- Miroslav Hanuš as Antonín Hložánek
- Matouš Ruml as David Kučera
- Martin Finger as Evžen Šmýd
