= Stockholm Syndrome (miniseries) =

2020 Czech crime thriller miniseries

- Written by: Miroslav Sovják
- Directed by: Dan Svátek
- Starring: David Švehlík
- Music by: Norbi Kovács
- Country of origin: Czech Republic
- Original language: Czech

Production
- Cinematography: Jakub Šimůnek
- Running time: 148 Minutes
- Production company: Czech Television

Original release
- Release: 12 January – 19 January 2020

Stockholmský syndrom (English: Stockholm Syndrome) is a 2020 Czech crime thriller miniseries directed by Dan Svátek. The first episode premiered on 12 January 2020 and was watched by 1,200,000 people. The second episode premiered on 19 January 2020.

== Cast ==
- David Švehlík as Viktor Mojžíš
- Martin Finger as Jindřich Osecký
- Zuzana Mauréry as Helena Osecká
- Elizaveta Maximová as Klára Osecká
- Vojtěch Vondráček as Lukáš Kulhánek
- Martin Pechlát as pplk. Taraba
- Michal Čapka as Colleague
- Pavel Batěk as Mareš
