= Šárka Ullrichová =

Czech actress (born 1974)

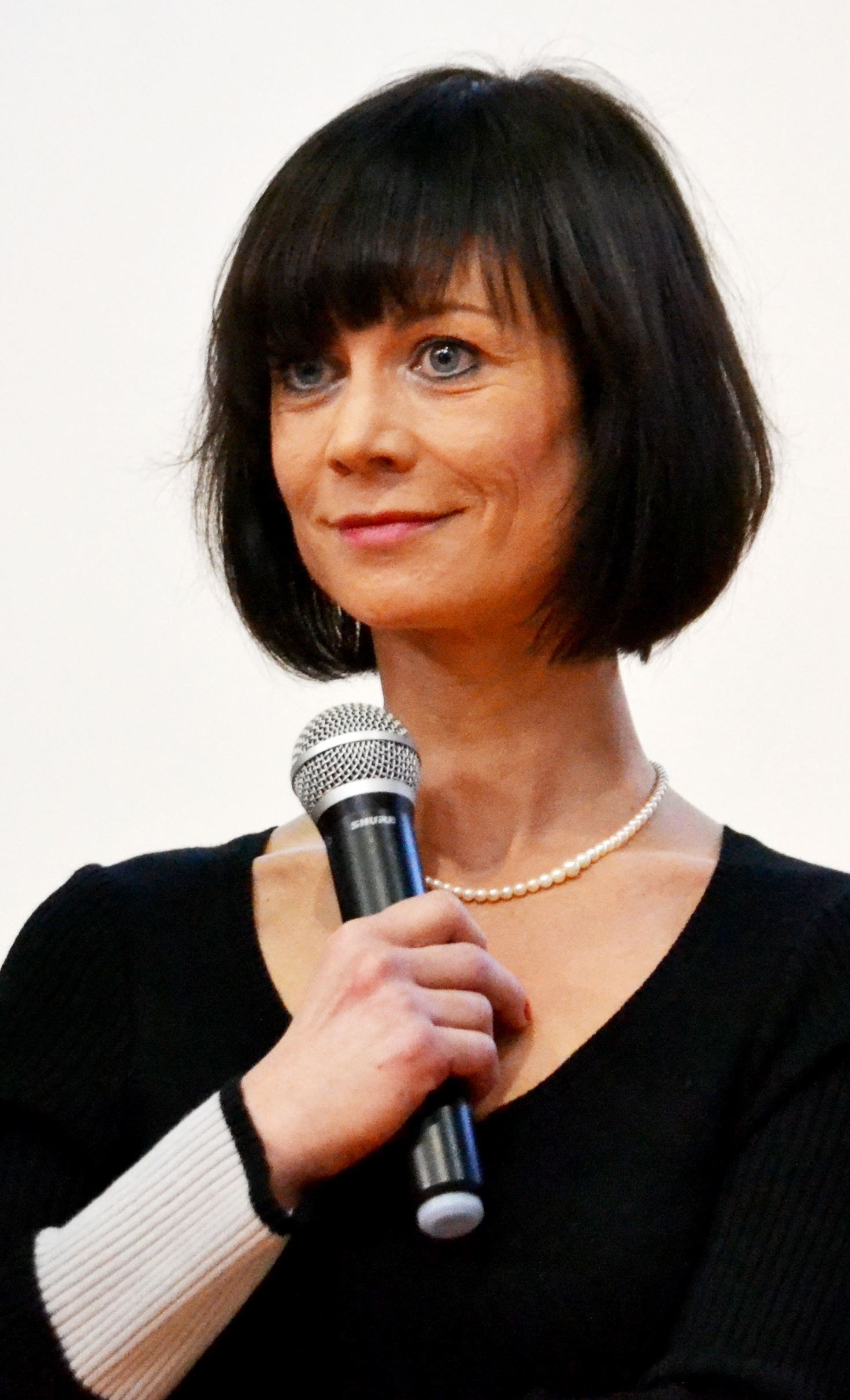
- Ullrichová in 2015
- Born: 10 December 1974 (age 51); Turnov, Czechoslovakia
- Occupation: Actress
- Years active: 1988–present

Šárka Ullrichová (born 10 December 1974) is a Czech actress best known for her role as Zuzana Hrubá in Ulice. She was born on December 10, 1974, in the town of Turnov in Czechoslovakia. Having graduated from the DAMU, she received a job at the Šalda theatre (Czech: Divadlo Františka Xavera Šaldy) in Liberec. Šárka Ullrichová has performed numerous television shows and movies, including appearances in Pleasant Moments.
