= Nagano Kids =

- Directed by: Dan Pánek
- Starring: Hynek Čermák; Tomáš Richard Brenton
- Cinematography: David Ployhar
- Music by: Jiří Hájek
- Distributed by: Bontonfilm
- Release date: 22 February 2023
- Running time: 98 Minutes
- Country: Czech Republic
- Language: Czech
- Budget: 23 Million CZK

Nagano Kids (Czech: Děti Nagana, also known as Children of Nagano) is a 2023 Czech sports comedy film directed by Dan Pánek. The creators presented the film to journalists on 16 February 2023. It premiered in theatres on 22 February of the same year.

== Plot ==
Schoolboy Dominik age 11, decides to play ice hockey due to euphory after watching the national team's victory in the tournament of the century in Nagano. He gets a hockey stick and puts together a group of boys; they train together on the concrete area behind the house, and it doesn't matter at all that they play with a tennis ball. They plan to challenge the older boys from the neighboring village to a match; in addition, Dominik strives for the favor of his classmate Katka.

== Cast ==
- Hynek Čermák as Karel
- Klára Issová as Eva
- Taťjana Medvecká as grandma Natálie
- Otakar Brousek as Grandpa Josef
- Tomáš Richard Brenton as Dominik
- Pavel Batěk as Milan
- Johana Racková as Katka
- Simona Babčáková as teacher Hrabáková
- Dominik Hašek as himself

== Reception ==
At the 56th Ota Hofman Children's Film and Television Festival, the film won the Ostrovský Dudek Award for the Best work in the category under 12 years hile Tom Brenton won the Ostrovský Dudek Award for the best boy performance and Johana Racková won the Ostrovský Dudek Award for the best girl performance.
