= Eliška a Damián =

- Genre: Adventure, Fantasy, Romance
- Directed by: Lukáš Buchar, Jaromír Polišenský
- Starring: Emma Smetana; Robert Urban
- Country of origin: Czech Republic
- Original language: Czech
- No. of seasons: 1
- No. of episodes: 12

Production
- Production location: Czech Republic
- Running time: 60 minutes

Original release
- Network: Prima televize
- Release: September 2 – November 13, 2023

Eliška a Damián is a Czech fantasy romantic television series starring Emma Smetana and Robert Urban that started broadcast in 2023. It was announced in June 2023 by FTV Prima as the main new program for Autumn 2023. Season 2 and 3 were filmed before the broadcast of first season while season 4 was planned according Extra.cz. The series was eventually cancelled after season 1 due to negative reception and low ratings. Season 2 which was confirmed to be finished was shelved.

== Plot ==
Eliška lives in the present day, while Damián comes from 1758. Thanks to an accidentally created potion, Damián travels through time and meets Eliška. They fall in love but Damián is to be engaged to Prussian princess Frederika while Eliška has to take care of the marmalade factory she inherited.

== Cast ==
- Emma Smetana as Eliška
- Robert Urban as Prince Damián
- Anežka Rusevová as Princess Frederika
- Anna Dvořáková as younger sister of Damián Eleonora
- Jan Komínek as scientist Matouš
- Petr Buchta as Martin - Eliška’s boyfriend
- Milan Šteindler as administrator
- Michaela Kuklová as Naďa
- Dana Syslová as Eliška’s grandma Kateřina
- Hana Drozdová as Lucie Majerová, Eliška’s best friend
- Petr Vaněk as Morten
- Michaela Dittrichová as Jolana - Eliška’s friend
- Martin Písařík as Honza, Martin's brother
- Jan Burda as Adam, uncle of Damián and the current ruler
- Marta Jandová as Terezie
- Štěpán Coufal as Milan, Jolana's ex-husband
- Štěpán Staněk as Tomáš Mlynář, Eliška's brother
- Jiří Suchý of Tábor as Jakub Sedláček, farmer who becomes Damián's double
- Tomáš Měcháček as Vít Hlaváček
- Jiří Dvořák as Narrator (voice only)

== Episodes ==
No.	Title	Directed by	Written by	Original release date	Czech viewers (millions)
1	"1"	Lukáš Buchar	David Holý	September 2, 2023	0.743
2	"2"	Lukáš Buchar	Jiří Suchý	September 9, 2023	0.345
3	"3"	Lukáš Buchar	David Holý	September 9, 2023	0.381
4	"4"	Lukáš Buchar	Jiří Suchý	September 18, 2023	0.294
5	"5"	Jaromír Polišenský	David Holý	September 25, 2023	0.251
6	"6"	Jaromír Polišenský	Jiří Suchý	October 2, 2023	0.269
7	"7"	Jaromír Polišenský	David Holý	October 9, 2023	0.256
8	"8"	Jaromír Polišenský	Unknown	October 16, 2023	0.242
9	"9"	Lukáš Buchar	Unknown	October 23, 2023	0.231
10	"10"	Lukáš Buchar	Unknown	October 30, 2023	N/A
11	"11"	Unknown	Unknown	November 6, 2023	N/A
12	"12"	Unknown	Unknown	November 13, 2023	N/A

== Reception ==
The series received largely negative reviews following the broadcast of first episode. Audience reactions were also negative. Most criticism was aimed at Emma Smetana and her performance. Andrea Zunová stated that it is visible she isn't an actress. Negative reception resulted in a large drop in viewers between episodes 1 and 2. This led Prima to move its broadcast time from Saturday to Monday.
