= Pod hladinou =

- Genre: Crime
- Written by: Lucie Paulová
- Directed by: Vojtěch Moravec
- Starring: Matěj Hádek; Sandra Nováková; Marek Adamczyk
- Country of origin: Czech Republic
- Original language: Czech
- No. of seasons: 1
- No. of episodes: 8

Production
- Running time: 51-70 minutes

Original release
- Network: Prima televize
- Release: May 4 – June 15, 2023

Related
- Na vlnách Jadranu

Pod hladinou (Below the Surface) is a Czech television series that aired in 2023. It was broadcast by Prima televize. It was originally broadcast on streaming service Prima+ with first 2 episodes broadcast on 4 May 2023. On 30 August 2023 it started broadcast on Prima television channel. The series focuses on work of police divers. It was renewed for season 2.

== Plot ==
The series is set at Slapy Reservoir. Lieutenant Zach arrives as a temporary addition to the local river police. He is a professional diver from the Brno base and holder of a P4 diving license. His girlfriend Alice, an investigator from the regional police headquarters in Zbraslav, is also waiting for him. Zach wants to save their relationship and turn it from a long-distance relationship into a close relationship. It becomes clear that all is not well with Zach. He always finds a reason not to dive. Others including Alice start to notice. Yet he claims that everything is fine, and at the same time he is more and more withdrawn which drives Alice to Zach's best friend and colleague Zdeněk. Commander Vopěnka also notices Zach's strangeness and wants to make Zach confess why he is afraid to dive. Zach keeps denying it, but despite everything he goes under the water.

== Cast ==
- Matěj Hádek as Lt. Jan Zach
- Sandra Nováková as Alice Jirásková
- Marek Adamczyk as Zdeněk Říha
- Šárka Krausová as René Krejčí
- Václav Vydra as Ota Vopěnka
- Filip Tomsa as Jakub Rydlo
- Dita Krejčová as Jana Stryková

== Episodes ==
No.	Title	Directed by	Written by	Original release date	Czech viewers (millions)
1	"Pod hladinou"	Vojtěch Moravec	Lucie Paulová	May 4, 2023	1.175
2	"Voda"	Vojtěch Moravec	Lucie Paulová	May 4, 2023	1,042
3	"Válka rybářů"	Vojtěch Moravec	Lucie Paulová	May 11, 2023	0.957
4	"Závod s časem"	Vojtěch Moravec	Lucie Paulová	May 18, 2023	1.028
5	"Chladnokrevně"	Vojtěch Moravec	Lucie Paulová	May 25, 2023	0.988
6	"Hejl"	Vojtěch Moravec	Lucie Paulová	June 1, 2023	1.117
7	"Ve tmě"	Vojtěch Moravec	Lucie Paulová	June 8, 2023	1.113
8	"Na hladinu"	Vojtěch Moravec	Lucie Paulová	June 15, 2023	1.066

== Sequel ==
In February 2023 Prima announced sequel series Na vlnách Jadranu. Matěj Hádek and Sandra Nováková are set to return as Jan Zach and Alice Jirásková respectively. It started broadcast on 18 October 2023.
