= The Old Blunderbuss Mystery 2 =

2022 Czech fantasy film

- Film poster
- Tajemství staré bambitky 2
- Directed by: Ivo Macharáček
- Written by: Evžen Gogela; Ivo Macharáček
- Produced by: Daniel Rouha; Tomáš Luňáček; Zuzana Vrbová; Markéta Sedelmayerová
- Starring: Ondřej Vetchý; Kamila Janovičová; Tomáš Klus
- Cinematography: Jan Kvasnička
- Edited by: Zdeněk Smrčka
- Music by: Václav Noid Bárta
- Production company: Studio KF
- Distributed by: Bioscop
- Release date: 10 February 2022
- Running time: 103 minutes
- Country: Czech Republic
- Language: Czech
- Budget: 36,300,000 CZK
- Box office: 56,277,759 CZK

The Old Blunderbuss Mystery 2 (Czech: Tajemství staré bambitky 2) is a Czech fantasy film directed by Ivo Macharáček. A sequel to the 2011 fantasy film The Old Blunderbuss Mystery, it was released in 2022.

== Cast ==
- Ondřej Vetchý as potter Jan Karaba, former robber
- Veronika Khek Kubařová as queen Julie I.
- Tomáš Klus as king Jakub
- Kamila Janovičová as queen Anička, Karaba's daughter
- Valentýna Bečková as princess Johanka, daughter of king Jakub and queen Anička
- Miroslav Vladyka as advisor Ferenc
- Jiří Lábus as advisor Lorenc
- Václav Noid Bárta as groom Václav
- Petr Štěpánek as chef Frit
- Markéta Plánková as chambermaid Hermína
- Leoš Noha as farmer Macháně
