= Her Body =

- Directed by: Natálie Císařovská
- Written by: Natálie Císařovská; Aneta Honzkova
- Produced by: Katarina Krnacova; Viktor Schwarcz
- Starring: Natalia Germani; Cyril Dobrý; Denisa Barešová
- Cinematography: Klára Belicová
- Edited by: Jan Daňhel
- Music by: Aid Kid; Pjoni
- Production company: Cineart TV
- Distributed by: REASON8; Bontonfilm
- Release date: 16 November 2023
- Running time: 105 min
- Countries: Czech Republic; Slovakia
- Language: Czech

Her Body (Czech: Její tělo) is a 2023 drama film directed by Natálie Císařovská. It is Císařovská's debut feature film. The film is based on a true story of Andrea Absolonová, who was a Czech diver and a member of the Czech high diving national team. She would later become an adult model and pornographic actress who died in 2004 at the age of 27.

The film was supported by the State Cinematography Fund and the SK Audiovisual Fund.

== Plot ==
When injury shatters Andrea's dream of success as an Olympic diving champion, she goes on to make a name for herself as an adult film star.

== Cast ==
- Natalia Germani as Andrea Absolonová
- Denisa Barešová as Lucie Absolonová
- Zuzana Mauréry as Absolonová's mother
- Martin Finger as Absolonová's father
- Zuzana Stivínová
- Cyril Dobrý
- Martina Mrakviová

== Release ==
Her Body had its world premiere in 2023 in Critics' Pick section of the 27th edition of the Tallinn Black Nights Film Festival (PÖFF). It was released in Czechia and Slovakia in November 2023 in 2 versions - censored for people 15+ years and uncensored for people 18+ years. International sales are handled by London-based REASON8. Besides Czechia and Slovakia the film was released in more than 10 countries including the US (by Film Movement), UK, Australia and New Zealand (by TMP), Germany (by Busch Media Group) and Japan (by At Entertainment). It received Best Supporting Actress nomination for Denisa Barešová at Czech Lions Awards 2024.
