= Ondřej Sokol =

Czech actor and director

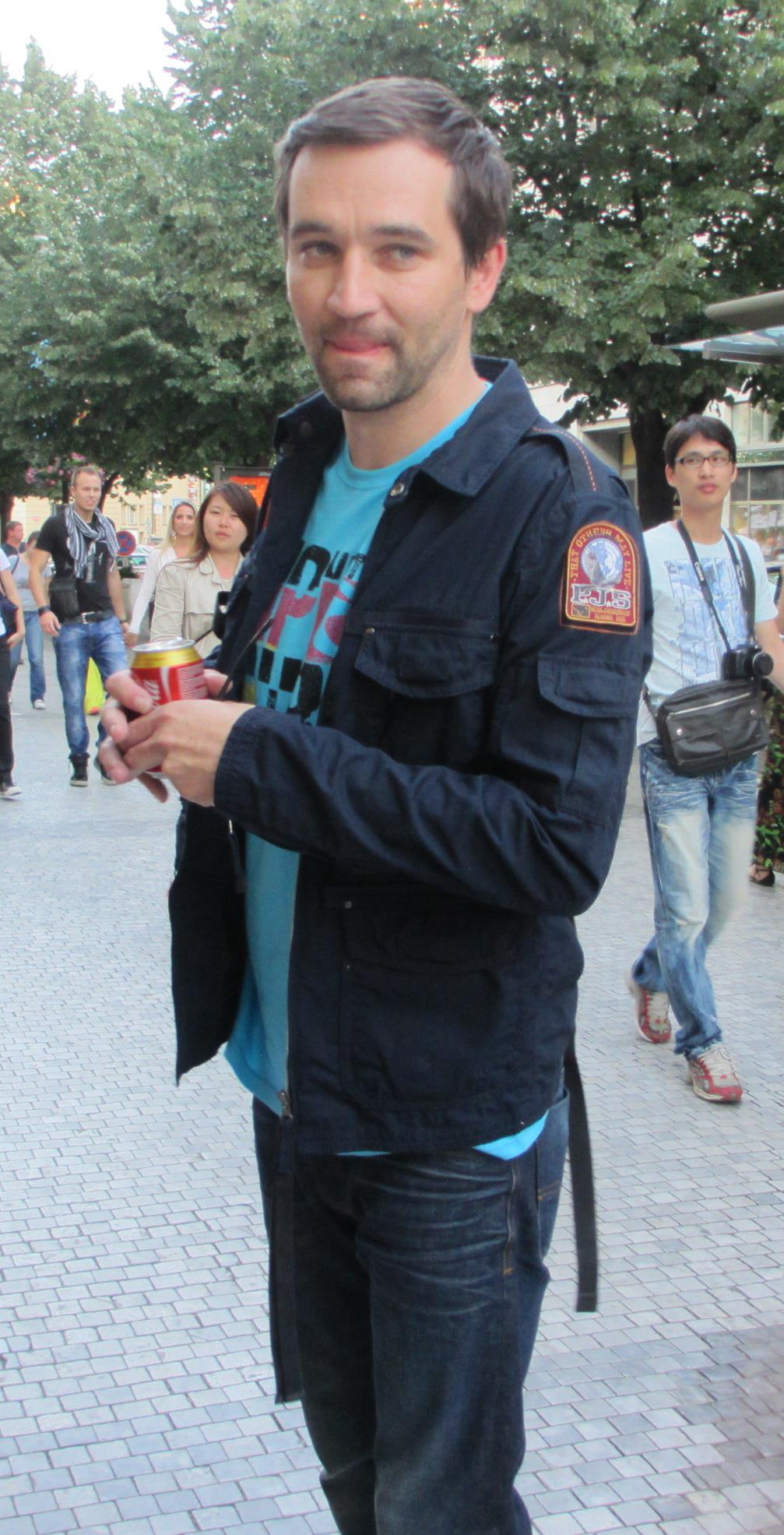
- Ondřej Sokol (2012)
- Born: 16 October 1971 (age 54); Šumperk, Czechoslovakia
- Education: Academy of Performing Arts in Prague
- Occupations: Actor, director, presenter, translator
- Years active: 1996–present
- Spouse: Kateřina Lojdová (1998–2010)
- Children: 2

Ondřej Sokol (born 16 October 1971), is a Czech actor, director, television presenter and translator.

== Personal life ==
Sokol was born at Šumperk, Czechoslovakia. After studying for five years at Theatre Faculty of the Academy of Performing Arts in Prague (DAMU) he joined a theatre in Mladá Boleslav. Three years later he moved to The Drama Club (DC) in Prague. Following a great success of The Lonesome West he received the Alfréd Radok Award in the category Talent of the Year and the Thálie Award for a young artist up to 33 years of age.

As a television presenter, he hosted all seasons of Tvoje tvář má známý hlas.

He is autistic.

== Selected performances – director ==
- 2013 – The War of The Roses, CZ (also translation)
- 2011 – Glengarry Glen Ross, DC (also translation)
- 2011 – A Behanding in Spokane, DC (also translation)
- 2008 – God of Carnage, DC
- 2007 – The Playboy of the Western World, DC
- 2006 – American Buffalo, DC (also translation)
- 2005 – The Pillowman, DC (also translation)
- 2004 – Sexual Perversity in Chicago, DC (also translation)
- 2002 – The Lonesome West, DC (also translation)

== Selected performances – actor ==
- 2006 – Vicomte de Valmont in Les Liaisons dangereuses, DC
- 2011–2013 – Partička – Czech comedial improvisation show

== Selected filmography ==
- Ordinace v růžové zahradě 2 (2006–2011) as Prokop Hrubý
- Rédl (2018) as Roman Rédl
- Nineties (2022) as Senior lieutenant František Tůma
- Be the Man (2023) as Weissner
- ONEMANSHOW: The Movie (2023) as himself
