= Rapl =

- Genre: Action, Crime, Thriller
- Starring: Hynek Čermák
- Country of origin: Czech Republic
- Original language: Czech
- No. of seasons: 2
- No. of episodes: 26

Production
- Running time: 53 minutes

Original release
- Network: Czech television
- Release: 2016 – 2019

Related
- Cirkus Bukowsky

Rapl (Fury) is a Czech crime television series. It was directed by Jan Pachl, who is the author of the script and, together with Josef Viewegh, also produced the series.

== Plot ==
Detective Kuneš beats up his ex-wife's boyfriend and is sent as an intern to a remote border region by his superior as a punishment. He is tasked to solve the two-year-old murder of policewoman Wágnerová, whose investigation has stalled. However, crime in the border region is one of the highest in the country - smuggling, drug production, poaching, prostitution, murder. Kuneš has to solve one difficult case after another.

== Cast ==
- Hynek Čermák as Major Kuneš
- Alexej Pyško as lieutenant colonel Jan Rohan
- Lukáš Příkazký as First Lieutenant Robin Lupínek
- Lucie Žáčková as Ůieutenant Jana Slepičková
- Jan Dolanský as Captain Marek Gregor
- Tomáš Jeřábek as First Lieutenant Mácha
- Lukáš Vaculík as KáGeBák Hojzar

== Production ==
Rapl is a spin-off from a previous series, Cirkus Bukowsky. The thirteen-part first season of the series premiered on Czech Television from 29 August 2016.

Filming for the second season began in November 2017. It also has 13 episodes. Filming lasted until autumn 2018. It was broadcast in early 2019.

== Awards ==
The series was ranked in a poll among iDNES.cz readers as the second best Czech crime series of the decade after Případy 1. oddělení.

The series was nominated for the Czech Lion awards and for the European television festival Prix Europa award.
