= Jedině Tereza =

2021 Czech romantic comedy film

- Directed by: Jaroslav Fuit
- Written by: Kateřina Gardner, Pavel Novák
- Produced by: Jindřich Motýl, Martin Růžička
- Starring: Veronika Khek Kubařová, Igor Orozovič
- Cinematography: Viktor Smutný
- Edited by: Marek Opatrný
- Music by: Jiří Burian
- Distributed by: CinemArt
- Release date: 9 September 2021
- Running time: 97 minutes
- Country: Czech Republic
- Language: Czech
- Box office: 4,648,919 CZK

Jedině Tereza (lit. 'Only Tereza') is a Czech romantic comedy film directed by Jaroslav Fuit, released in 2021.

== Cast ==
- Veronika Khek Kubařová as Tereza
- Igor Orozovič as Tomáš Zajíček
- Matouš Ruml as Karel, Tomáš' friend
- David Matásek as photographer Martin
- Emma Smetana as Valerie, TV host
- Lenka Vlasáková as Hana, Tereza's mother
- Anna Schmidtmajerová as Markéta, Tereza's friend
- Iva Janžurová as neighbor Hanušová
- Václav Kopta as TV chairman
- Pavel Řezníček as Bob, TV host
- Zuzana Žáková as young production
- Jitka Sedláčková as receptionist
- Vojtěch Vondráček as police officer Milan
- Karel Zima as police officer Zbyněk
- Kateřina Pindejová as Alena
- Alena Štréblová as Ilona
- Filip Čapka as well dressed guy
- Jiří Vyorálek as taxi driver
- Jiří Štrébl as coachman
- Ondřej Pavelka as record holder
- Vladimír Polívka as fan
