= Annaismissing =

- Directed by: Pavel Soukup
- Written by: Lucie Kryzová
- Starring: Alexandra Vostrejžová, Viktorie Vítová, Marek Němec
- Cinematography: Miloslav Holman
- Music by: Jindřich Kravařík
- Distributed by: Aerofilms
- Release date: 10 August 2023
- Running time: 108 minutes
- Country: Czech Republic
- Language: Czech
- Budget: 14,200,000 CZK
- Box office: 1,566,685 CZK

#annaismissing is a 2023 Czech thriller drama film directed by Pavel Soukup. It is a spiritual sequel to #martyisdead web series. The film was later split into 9 episodes and placed on Voyo VOD service as TV series.

== Plot ==
Anna, an influencer known for her provocative content, mysteriously goes silent on the networks. When fifteen-year-old Nina finds a photo of Anna half-naked on her dad's cell phone, she decides to track her down. This starts a series of events that change both Nina and her family's lives.

== Cast ==
- Alexandra Vostrejžová as Nina
- Viktorie Vítová as Anna
- Marek Němec as Eliáš, Nina's father
- Barbora Bočková as Linda, Nina's mother
- Magdalena Čečo as Robin
- Petra Bučková as Alena, Eliáš' colleague
- Vlastina Svátková as Anna's mother
- Terezie Holá as Nina's sister

== Reception ==
The film was released to positive reviews. It holds 77% on Kinobox from critics.
