= Three Tigers in the Movie: Jackpot =

Three Tigers in the movie: Jackpot
- Movie poster
- Czech: Tři Tygři ve filmu: JACKPOT
- Directed by: Emil Křižka
- Written by: Albert Čuba, Vladimír Polák
- Produced by: Albert Čuba, Lukáš Oramus, Jana Juříčková, Štěpán Kozub, David Blümel, Petr Kutáč
- Starring: Albert Čuba, Štěpán Kozub, Robin Ferro, Vladimír Polák
- Cinematography: Ryszard Perzynski
- Edited by: Emil Křižka, Maxmilián Čuba, Albert Čuba
- Music by: Michal Sedláček
- Distributed by: Bontonfilm
- Release date: 26 May 2022 (Czech Republic)
- Running time: 107 minutes
- Country: Czech Republic
- Language: Czech
- Budget: 10,000,000 CZK
- Box office: 20,945,802 CZK

Three Tigers in the movie: Jackpot (Czech: Tři Tygři ve filmu: JACKPOT) is a 2022 Czech action comedy film. It is based on a comedy improvisational show Three Tigers. On August 8, 2022, it was released on Netflix.

== Plot ==
The main characters of the film are Milan (Albert Čuba) and David Votrubek (Štěpán Kozub), who win the jackpot thanks to a lottery ticket, but for which they have to travel to Sazka's headquarters in Prague, which turns out to be a problem because they get lost on the way and eventually travel through Poland and Slovakia. On their heels are an incompetent policeman Robert (Robin Ferro) and unsuccessful actor Herbert (Vladimir Polák), who want to win the lottery for the mobster Král (Dušan Sitek). Král is struggling with financial problems and wants to take advantage of the stupidity and naivety of the main characters. However, little does he know that their journey together will bond the heroes together and he will have to use his best assassins to have a chance to win the lot.

== Cast ==
- Albert Čuba as Milan
- Štěpán Kozub as David Votrubek
- Robin Ferro as Robert
- Vladimír Polák as Herbert
- Dušan Sitek as Král
- Sára Erlebachová as Zbyhněva
- Petr Sýkora as Bubák
- Markéta Matulová as Ambrózie
- Zbigniew Kalina as Priest

== Reception ==
The film received mostly average to below-average ratings from Czech film critics.

In his review for Aktuálně.cz, Kamil Fila states that the Three Tigers are a phenomenon with a large audience, but the chosen format is not a film, but "a collection of sketches that do not hold together". In a review for the same periodical, Tomáš Stejskal states that in the film, Three Tigers lost the impact of its comedic scenes and that they do not find a way to make appropriate use of the aptly executed parodic passages. In a review for ČT art, Jan Jaroš writes that the humor in the film "does not take into account that the construction of a short sketch differs from the construction of a full-length story, which should not be a mere sum of such sketches".

The film was very successful on Czech Netflix beating with its ratings film such as The Gray Man or Carter.
