= Na horách =

2025 Czech romantic comedy film

- Directed by: Rudolf Havlík
- Written by: Rudolf Havlík, Lucie Korcová
- Produced by: Jiří Tuček
- Starring: Aneta Krejčíková, Igor Orozovič
- Cinematography: Jan Šuster
- Edited by: Boris Machytka
- Music by: Ondřej Konvička
- Distributed by: Donart Film
- Release date: 27 November 2025
- Running time: 117 minutes
- Country: Czech Republic
- Language: Czech
- Box office: 25,874,294 CZK

Na horách (lit. 'In the mountains') is a 2025 Czech adventure romantic comedy film co-written and directed by Rudolf Havlík.

== Plot ==
Lucie, a young woman from Prague, learns that her biological father, whom she never knew, died. She inherits a mountain cabin in the Giant Mountains and decides to go to the mountains to discover her roots. She meets Matěj, a member of the Mountain Service, who is her exact opposite. Their relationship is initially distant, but they begin to understand each other more and more over the time.

== Cast ==
- Aneta Krejčíková as Lucie
- Igor Orozovič as Matěj
- Veronika Khek Kubařová as Markéta
- Ondřej Pavelka as Josef
- Adéla Gondíková as Alena
- Saša Rašilov as Karel, Lucie's father
- Jan Dolanský as David
- Vasil Fridrich as Daniel
