= Her Drunken Diary =

- Theatrical release poster
- Directed by: Dan Svátek
- Written by: Marta Fenclová
- Starring: Tereza Ramba
- Cinematography: Jakub Šimůnek
- Music by: Jakub König
- Distributed by: Bontonfilm
- Release date: 11 July 2024
- Running time: 92 minutes
- Country: Czech Republic
- Language: Czech
- Box office: 91,939,536 CZK

Her Drunken Diary (Czech: Zápisník alkoholičky) is a 2024 Czech psychological drama film directed by Dan Svátek and written by Marta Fenclová. It stars Tereza Ramba.

== Plot ==
Young successful couple, Míša and Ondřej, move outside of Prague to live with Ondřej's parents. Ondřej works in Prague and is hardly at home. The stuffy atmosphere of living with her mother-in-law and father-in-law is unbearable for Míša, and she gradually begins to succumb to the temptations of alcohol and sink into social isolation.

== Cast ==
- Tereza Ramba as Míša
- Miloslav König as Ondřej
- Barbara Lukešová as Mother-in-law
- Miroslav Hanuš as Father-in-law
- Martin Finger
- Alžběta Malá

== Production ==
The film is based on the autobiographical book by Michaela Duffková who won the Magnesia Litera award in 2019 for her internet blog and later book diary. It follows on from the previous successful film directed by Dan Svátek, The Smiles of Sad Men, which was also based on the motifs of Jaroslav Formánek's book.

== Reception ==
Film critics praised performance of Tereza Ramba in the main role, but criticized the film for the superficiality in the depiction of the topic of alcoholism. Marta Fenclová's script and exploitative approach of director Dan Svátek were criticised by critics.
