= Falcon a.s. =

Czech film company

Falcon a.s. is a Czech film company founded in 1994. It focuses on distribution of Czech and foreign films. It distributed box office hits including Anděl Páně 2 or Avengers: Endgame. Falcon is one of main film distributors in the Czech Republic along with Cinemart, Vertical Entertainment a.s. and Bontonfilm. Its main rival is Cinemart.

As of 2022 Falcon holds 26% market share being the 2nd largest Czech film distributor.

== Films ==
=== Czech ===
Release date	Title	Notes
22 January 2015	Babovřesky 3	
19 February 2015	The Snake Brothers	
12 March 2015	Dodgeball	
1 October 2015	Wilson City	
22 October 2015	Lost in Munich	
19 November 2015	Aldabra: Once upon an Island	
11 February 2016	Decibels of Love	
3 March 2016	The Noonday Witch	
24 March 2016	Murderous Tales	
7 April 2016	We Are Never Alone	
18 August 2016	The Spooks	
22 September 2016	Code Name Holec	
28 September 2016	Anthropoid	
6 October 2016	The Good Plumber	
20 October 2016	The Oddsockeaters	
3 November 2016	Tales for Emma	
10 November 2016	The More I Know	
1 December 2016	Anděl Páně 2	
23 February 2017	Ice Mother	
20 April 2017	Filthy	
21 September 2017	Zkrátka kraťas	
21 September 2017	Happy End	
19 October 2017	Bikers	
30 November 2017	The Quartette	
1 February 2018	Prezident Blaník	
9 August 2018	Miss Hanoi	
4 October 2018	Toman	
25 October 2018	Golden Betrayal	
8 November 2018	The One Who Loved You	
29 November 2018	The Magic Quill	
26 September 2019	National Street	
24 October 2019	The Last of Noblewomen	
20 August 2026	Chica Checa	
