= Veronika Khek Kubařová =

Czech actress

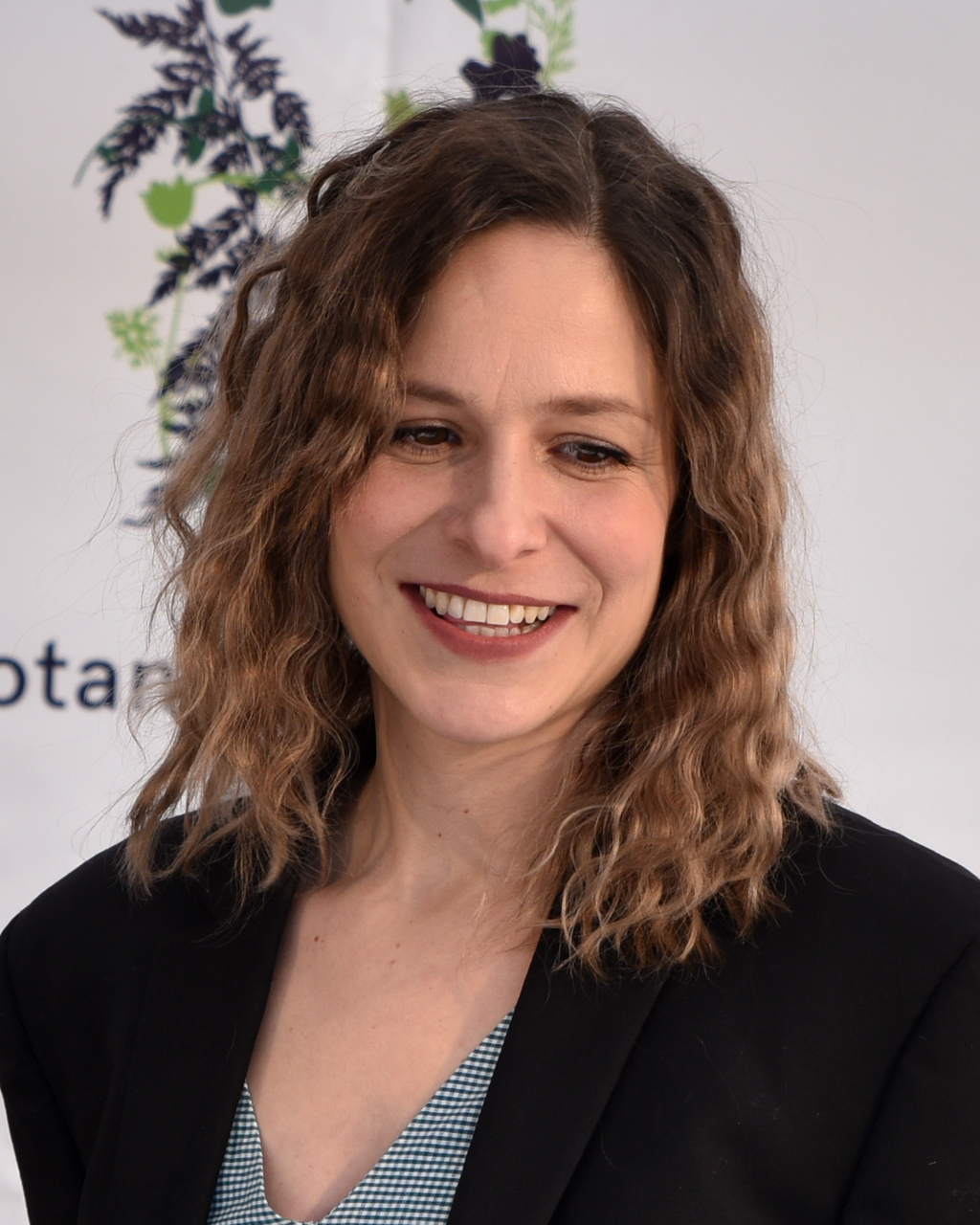
- Veronika Khek Kubařová (2025)
- Born: Veronika Kubařová; 1 June 1987 (age 39); Rakovník, Czechoslovakia
- Education: Prague Conservatory
- Occupation: Actress
- Years active: 2003–present
- Spouse: Pavel Khek (m. 2015)

Veronika Khek Kubařová (born 1 June 1987 in Rakovník) is a Czech actress. In December 2019 Khek Kubařová won the tenth season of StarDance with her professional partner Dominik Vodička.

From 2015 to 2023 she was a permanent member of the Dejvice Theatre.

== Selected filmography ==
=== Films ===
- Rafťáci (2006)
- Ženy v pokušení (2010)
- Lidice (2011)
- Můj vysvlečenej deník (2012)
- 10 pravidel jak sbalit holku (2014)
- Stuck with a Perfect Woman (2016)
- Ženy v běhu (2019)
- Modelář (2020)
- Jedině Tereza (2021)
- The Old Blunderbuss Mystery 2 (2022)
- Vyšehrad: Fylm (2022)
- Přání k narozeninám (2023)
- Treasure (2024)
- Na horách (2025)

=== TV series ===
- Mazalové (2014)
- Všechny moje lásky (2015)
- Na vodě (2016)
- Specialisté (2017)
- Zkáza Dejvického divadla (2019)
- Limity (2024)

== Personal life ==
On 17 April 2025, Khek Kubařová announced on Instagram her pregnancy and pause in her career. She gave birth to a son in August 2025.
