= Martyisdead =

#martyisdead
- Directed by: Pavel Soukup
- Starring: Jakub Nemčok, Jan Grundman, Petra Bučková
- Music by: Jindřich Kravařík
- Country of origin: Czech Republic
- No. of episodes: 8

Production
- Running time: 15 minutes
- Production company: Bionaut

Original release
- Network: Mall.TV
- Release: September 20 – December 8, 2019

#martyisdead is a Czech thriller webseries that was released on October 20, 2019 on Mall.TV. It was created in cooperation with CZ.NIC, filmed by the Czech company Bionaut. It deals with cyberbullying and was inspired by real events, drawing inspiration from Blue Whale Challenge.

== Plot ==
The series unravels the story of ninth-grade student Martin Biederman, who becomes a victim of cyberbullying. Martin is killed in a car accident at the beginning of the series, and his father, Petr Biederman, finds out from his Facebook profile that he was blackmailed by someone posing as a girl named Eliška Svobodová. "Eliška" convinced Martin to send her a video of him masturbating, then used it to blackmail him, forcing him to carry out tasks such as killing his family dog by putting it in a freezer. Petr, finding the police investigation of his son's death to be progressing too slowly, begins investigating on his own, gradually unraveling the sequence of events that led to his demise.

== Cast ==
- Jakub Nemčok as Martin "Marty" Biederman
- Jan Grundman as Petr Biederman, Marty's father
- Petra Bučková as Alena Biedermanová, Marty's mother
- Sára Korbelová as Kristýna, Marty's girlfriend
- Matěj Havelka as Kryštof, Marty's friend
- Andrej Polák as Marty's teacher
- Jan Zadražil as a van driver
- Klára Miklasová as secretary
- Tomáš Bambušek as criminalist

== Broadcast ==
The pilot episode was broadcast on October 20 2019 on its website by MALL.TV; the remaining seven episodes were published every Sunday until 8 December 2019. During the preparation of the sequel, the series received an Emmy Award nomination.

== Reception ==
=== Awards ===
In September 2020, #martyisdead was historically the first Czech series to be nominated for an international Emmy Award, in the category of Short-Form Series. The series won the award in November. It won the main prize at the Serial Killer festival, where it premiered. In March 2021, it won the Czech Lion Award for the Extraordinary achievement in the field of audiovisual.

== Spiritual sequel ==
The sequel, called #annaismissing, is again co-produced by MALL.TV and Bionaut. It was originally scheduled for release in May 2021. Creators eventually decided to produce it as a feature-length film. It premiered in 2023.
