= Shadowplay (2022 film) =

- Theatrical release poster
- Directed by: Peter Bebjak
- Screenplay by: Vendula Bradácová
- Story by: Jan Bradác
- Starring: Milan Ondrík; Hynek Čermák
- Cinematography: Martin Ziaran
- Edited by: Marek Král'ovský
- Music by: Avishai Cohen; Juraj Dobrakov
- Distributed by: Falcon
- Release date: 7 April 2022
- Running time: 103 minutes
- Countries: Czech Republic; Slovakia
- Language: Czech
- Budget: 23,049,150 CZK
- Box office: 693,641 CZK

Shadowplay (Czech: Stínohra, Slovak: Tieňohra) is a 2022 Czech-Slovak crime thriller film directed by Peter Bebjak and written by Vendula Bradácová. The film was originally to be released on 23 October 2021 but was delayed due to COVID-19 pandemic.

== Cast ==
- Milan Ondrík
- Hynek Čermák
- Vladimír Javorský
- Dominika Morávková
- Kristýna Frejová
- Leona Skleničková
- Jan Jankovský
