= Be the Man (film) =

- Directed by: Michal Samir
- Starring: Jakub Prachař; Tereza Ramba
- Cinematography: Milan Chadima
- Music by: Jiří Burian
- Distributed by: Bioscop
- Release date: 23 March 2023
- Running time: 96 Minutes
- Country: Czech Republic
- Language: Czech
- Box office: 31,317,560 CZK

Be the Man (Czech: Buď chlap!) is a 2023 Czech adventure comedy film directed by Michal Samir.

== Plot ==
Pavel is nearing his forties but he never really came of age. He still lives with his parents and lacks courage to move on with his life - at least until he meets his childhood sweetheart Tereza and spends an adventurous night with her. Unfortunately, Tereza isn't ready to leave her current life for somebody who isn't a real man. Pavel decides to become such a man and signs up for a training camp in Tatra Mountains led by Weissner. The trip soon turns into an unexpected adventure when Pavel gets separated from the rest of the group, while Tereza finds out about the camp and arrives with Pavel's family to find him.

== Cast ==
- Jakub Prachař as Pavel
- Tereza Ramba as Tereza
- Ondřej Sokol as Weissner
- Filip Novák as Karol
- Sabina Remundová as Jitka
- Ester Geislerová as Martina
- Naďa Konvalinková as Pavel's mother
- David Prachař as Pavel's father
- Ondřej Veselý as Roman
- Ivana Chýlková as Jana
- Igor Bareš as Miroslav
