= Chica Checa =

2026 Czech comedy-drama film

- Theatrical release poster
- Directed by: Šimon Holý
- Screenplay by: Šimon Holý
- Produced by: Alžběta Janáčková
- Starring: Pavla Tomicová; Jan Cina; Alexandra Borbély; Erwan Kepoa Falé
- Cinematography: Jana Hojdová
- Edited by: Sabina Mladenová
- Music by: Šimon Holý
- Production companies: Silk Films; The French Connection; Arina
- Distributed by: Falcon a.s.
- Release dates: 4 July 2026 (KVIFF); 20 August 2026 (Czech Republic)
- Running time: 97 minutes
- Countries: Czech Republic; France; Slovakia
- Language: Czech

Chica Checa is a 2026 comedy-drama film written and directed by Šimon Holý. Starring Pavla Tomicová, Jan Cina, Alexandra Borbély and Erwan Kepoa Falé the film follows Zdena, widowed village postwoman, who is trying to fulfill the last wish of her ailing mother. A series of unexpected events brings her closer to her drag queen son Lukáš.

The film, a co-production between Czech Republic, France and Slovakia premiered at 60th Karlovy Vary International Film Festival on 4 July 2026, where it was nominated for the Crystal Globe.

== Synopsis ==
Zdena lives a quiet but difficult life in a small Czech village, caring for her dying mother while staying connected to her son Lukáš, who claims to be thriving in France. When Věra's final wish prompts Zdena to beg Lukáš to return home, his visit exposes his hidden life as Chico Checo and forces both mother and son to confront long-buried truths. As identities unravel, Zdena begins to imagine a future beyond the limits of her rural routine.

== Cast ==
- Pavla Tomicová as Zdena
- Jan Cina as Lukas
- Alexandra Borbély as Réka
- Erwan Kepoa Falé as Remi
- Jitka Schneiderová as Irena Trávníková
- Alena Dolakova as Kamila Reiner
- Natalia Rehorov as Bozena
- Sara Venclovská as Nada
- Věra Janků as Vera
- Martin Hronsky as Jaromír
- Miroslav Kumhala as Míra
- Ludmila Sonková as Paní Janáková

== Production ==
Pavla Tomicová and Jan Cina were cast to play the lead roles of mother and son whereas Alexandra Borbély, Alena Doláková, Jitka Schneiderová, Natálie Řehořová, Sára Venclovská, Erwan Kepoa Falé, Věra Janků, Ludmila Sonková, Miroslav Kumhala and Martin Hronský were cast in supporting roles.

Šluknov Hook provided the backdrop for the film, which was shot in the summer of 2024 in the Ústí nad Labem Region and Plzeň Region, as well as in Brno and France.

The shooting for the film was wrapped in October 2024.

In October 2025, the film was selected in works in progress for Warsaw Co-Production Forum which took place on 16 October as part of Warsaw Industry Days, during the 41st Warsaw Film Festival at Museum of Modern Art, Warsaw. It was showcased along with 4 other projects.

== Release ==
Chica Checa had its world premiere at the 2026 Karlovy Vary International Film Festival on 4 July 2026 in Crystal Globe Competition.

The film will be theatrically released in Czech Republic on 20 August 2026 by Falcon a.s..

The film was shortlisted for Czech submission for the 99th Academy Awards for Best International Feature Film.

== Reception ==
Writing for Cineuropa, Martin Kudláč described the film as a warm and humanistic family drama that explores acceptance, grief and personal renewal through the evolving relationship between a mother and her son. Kudláč observed that, despite its accessible and occasionally humorous storytelling, the film is "far from a rambunctious comedy". He opined that the film is less concerned with Lukáš's queer identity than with Zdena's growing ability to accept her son while rediscovering purpose in her own life. Kudláč praised Holý's restrained direction, noting that the rural setting avoids turning queer identity into a source of public conflict and instead keeps the drama focused on the characters' private emotional lives. He highlighted Pavla Tomicová's "quietly expressive performance" as the emotional anchor of the film and concluded that Chica Checa is a "touching, hopeful portrait" of a woman learning to see both her son and herself from a new perspective.

== Accolades ==
Award	Date of ceremony	Category	Recipient(s)	Result	Ref
Karlovy Vary International Film Festival	11 July 2026	Crystal Globe Grand Prix	Chica Checa	Nominated	
