= Treasure (2024 Czech film) =

2024 Czech adventure comedy film

- Poklad
- Directed by: Rudolf Havlík
- Written by: Rudolf Havlík
- Produced by: Petr Erben
- Starring: Veronika Khek Kubařová, Jiří Langmajer
- Cinematography: Jan Šuster
- Edited by: Boris Machytka
- Music by: Ondřej Konvička
- Distributed by: CinemArt
- Release date: 24 October 2024
- Running time: 100 minutes
- Country: Czech Republic
- Language: Czech
- Box office: 15,977,630 CZK

Treasure (Czech: Poklad) is a Czech adventure comedy film directed by Rudolf Havlík, released in 2024.

== Cast ==
- Veronika Khek Kubařová as Julie Skálová (daughter)
- Jiří Langmajer as Karel Skála (father)
- Petra Bučková as diver and researcher Anna
- Kateřina Marie Fialová as technician Marie
- Tadeáš Moravec as diver Petr
- Vasil Fridrich as Julia's restaurant boss
- Tereza Hof as Julia's psychotherapist
