= Až po uši =

- Directed by: Jan Hřebejk
- Starring: Anna Geislerová; Jiří Havelka; Hynek Čermák; Jitka Čvančarová
- Country of origin: Czech Republic
- Original language: Czech
- No. of seasons: 2
- No. of episodes: 23

Production
- Running time: 35 minutes

Original release
- Network: HBO Europe
- Release: 2014 – 2018

Až po uši (English: Head Over Heels) is a Czech romantic television series from 2014–18, directed by Jan Hřebejk and produced by HBO. Anna Geislerová, Jiří Havelka, Jitka Čvančarová, Hynek Čermák, Anna Polívková, Jana Kolesárová, Lenka Krobotová and Radek Holub appeared in the main roles. In the second row, Zuzana Šulajová, Stanislav Majer, Taťjana Medvecká and František Němec joined the main characters.

The music for the series, including the theme song called "Girl", was composed by Vladivojna La Chia. She sang the theme song together with singer Matěj Ruppert.

The series has a total of twenty-three episodes, each lasting an average of thirty-five minutes. It is based on Israeli series Matay Nitnashek.

== Plot ==
The focuses on various romantic relationships. Šárka is in love with Jakub but Jakub's ex-girlfriend Markéta stands in her way. Zuzana has problems with her philandering husband Milan and she herself later finds love with the masseuse Linda. Zuzana's friend Ema has problems with her appearance and ignores the interest of her colleague Karel.

== Cast ==
- Anna Geislerová as Šárka
- Jiří Havelka as Jakub
- Jitka Čvančarová as Zuzana
- Hynek Čermák as Milan
- Anna Polívková as Ema
- Radek Holub as Karel
- Lenka Krobotová as Markéta
- Jana Kolesárová as Linda
