= Vladimír Pokorný =

Czech footballer (born 1980)

Personal information
- Full name: Vladimír Pokorný
- Date of birth: 30 October 1980 (age 46)
- Place of birth: Czechoslovakia
- Height: 1.86 m (6 ft 1 in)
- Position: Forward

Team information
- Current team: Slavoj Vyšehrad B (player); Slavoj Vyšehrad (youth coach)
- Number: 12

Senior career*
| Years | Team | Apps | (Gls) |
| 2002 | Sparta Prague | | |
| 2002–2003 | Sparta Prague B | | |
| 2003–2005 | Jablonec | 16 | (0) |
| 2005–2006 | Viktoria Žižkov | | |
| 2006–2007 | → Vítkovice (loan) | | |
| 2007 | Viktoria Žižkov | | |
| 2007–2008 | → Dukla Prague (loan) | | |
| 2008 | Čáslav | | |
| 2008–2009 | Viktoria Žižkov B | | |
| 2009–2010 | → Vlašim (loan) | 27 | (1) |
| 2010–2011 | Hradec Králové | 11 | (1) |
| 2011– | Viktoria Žižkov | 0 | (0) |
| 2011–2013 | → Vlašim (loan) | 52 | (2) |
| 2013–2014 | Čáslav | | |
| 2014–2019 | Jirny | | |
| 2019 | Uhelné sklady | | |
| 2019–2021 | Slavoj Vyšehrad B | | |

Managerial career
- 2015–2019: Jirny (player-manager)
- 2019: Slavoj Vyšehrad (U19)
- * Club domestic league appearances and goals

Vladimír Pokorný (born 30 October 1980) is a Czech football player who currently plays for the B-team of FC Slavoj Vyšehrad and also works as a youth coach at the club. As a player he took part in the Czech First League for Hradec Králové; he also played for various clubs in the second-tier Czech National Football League and lower levels.

== Career ==
After playing for Hradec Králové in the 2010–11 Czech First League, Pokorný returned to Viktoria Žižkov in June 2011. His return was short-lived, however, as just a month later he was loaned out to Vlašim. Pokorný headed to Čáslav in the summer of 2013. He became player-manager of SK Viktorie Jirny in October 2015. In the beginning of 2019, Pokorný joined SK Uhelné sklady Prague.

In August 2019, Pokorný was appointed U19 manager of FC Slavoj Vyšehrad and was also registered to play for the club's reserve/B-team. On 14 December 2019 it was confirmed, that he had been released as U19 manager and would continue as a youth coach for the club.
