= Aneta Krejčíková =

Czech actress (born 1991)

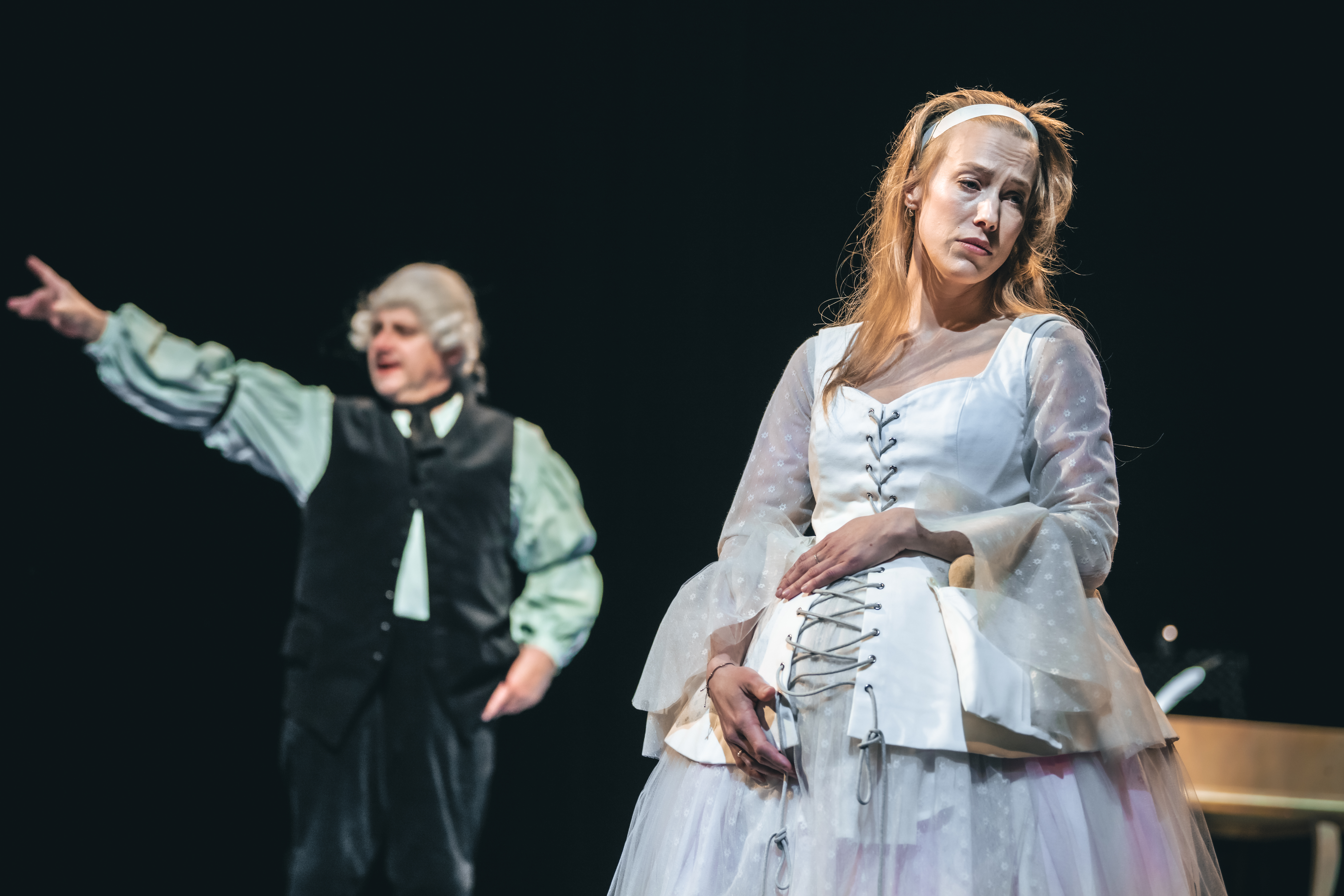
- Krejčíková in the role of Anna Wilcke, Bach & Sons, Vinohrady Theatre (2023)
- Born: 29 April 1991 (age 34); Prague, Czechoslovakia
- Occupation: Actress
- Years active: 2005–present
- Children: 2

Aneta Krejčíková (born 29 April 1991 in Prague) is a Czech actress, known mainly for her role in the TV soap opera Ulice.

== Selected filmography ==
=== Films ===
- Sama v čase normálnosti (2010) TV
- Poupata (2011)
- Láska je láska (2012)
- Murder in Polná (2016) TV
- Špindl (2017)
- Na horách (2025)

=== TV series ===
- Ulice (2005)
- Cesty domů (2010)
- Obchoďák (2012)
- Případy 1. oddělení (2014)
- Rapl (2016)
- Svět pod hlavou (2017)
- Volha (2023)

== Personal life ==
In 2017, Krejčíková got engaged to her partner Ondřej Rančák. They had a son Ben in September 2018 and daughter Antonia in April 2020.
