= Jordan Haj =

Czech musician and actor

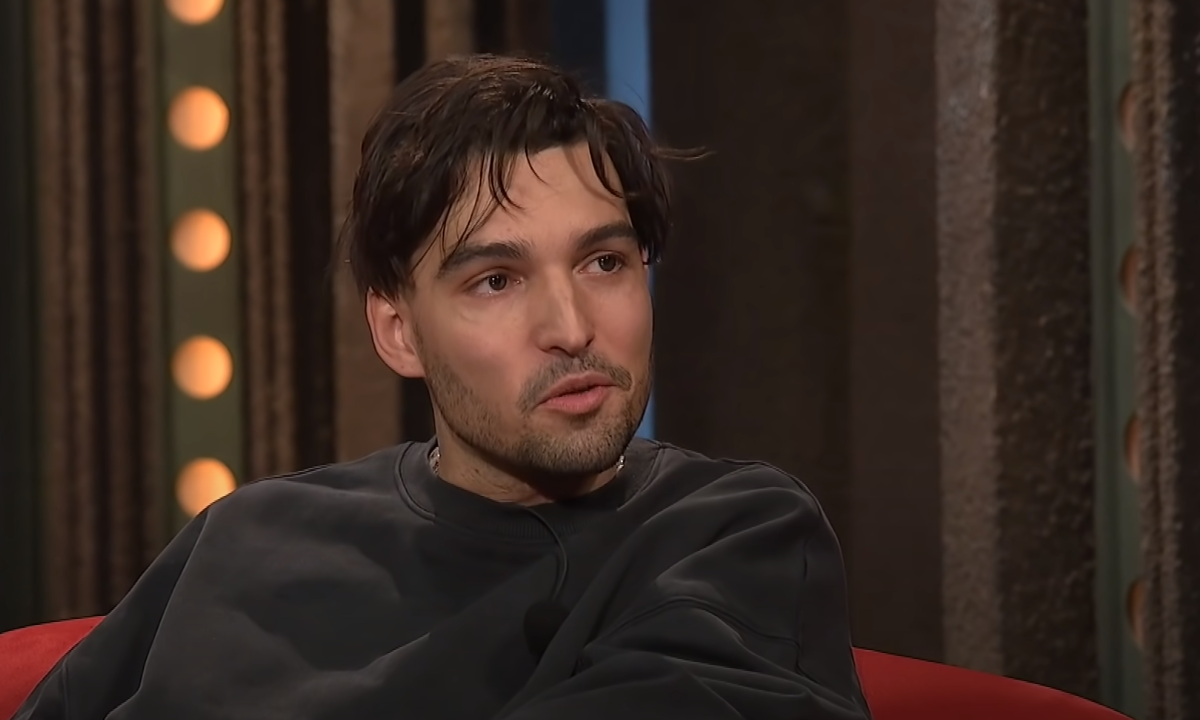
- Haj in 2021

Background information
- Born: Jordan Haj Hossein; 1 October 1988 (age 37); Prague, Czechoslovakia
- Occupations: Singer; actor; director

Jordan Haj Hossein (born 1 October 1988 in Prague) is a Czech musician and actor.

== Biography ==
Haj was born on 1 October 1988 in Prague, Czechoslovakia. He was born to a Czech mother and a Palestinian father, his parents met while studying medicine in Prague. He grew up in Karlovy Vary until he was almost ten years old, then moved with his father to Akko in northern Israel. He moved back to his native Czech Republic to enroll at the Theatre Faculty of the Academy of Performing Arts in Prague in 2010, majoring in drama. In 2015, he successfully completed his studies.

== Filmography ==
- Nosferatu (2024)
- Na vodě (2016)
- 1864 (2014)
- Až po uši (2014)
- Clona (2014)
- Gympl s (r)učením omezeným (2013)
- Vyprávěj (2012, 2013)
- Cesty domů (2010)

== Discography ==
- By Now (2022) – with Emma Smetana
- The Ultimate Playlist for the End of the World (2024)
