= Andrea Absolonová =

Czech adult model and diver (1976-2004)

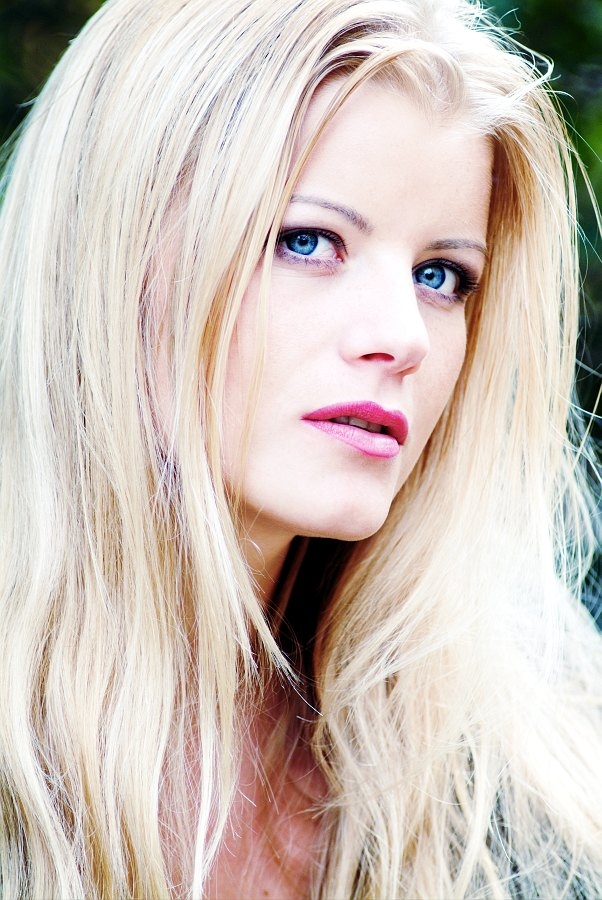
- Absolonová in 2003
- Born: 26 December 1976; Prague, Czechoslovakia
- Died: 9 December 2004 (aged 27); Prague, Czech Republic
- Other names: Lea De Mae; Big Leah; Leada Mae; Lea Demay
- Occupations: Diving; Pornographic actress Model
- Years active: 1990–1999 (diving); 1999–2004 (pornography)
- Height: 1.70 m (5 ft 7 in)

Andrea Absolonová (26 December 1976 – 9 December 2004), also known by the pseudonym Lea De Mae, was a Czech diver and a member of the Czech high diving national team, later an adult model and pornographic actress. She died from brain cancer on 9 December 2004, at the age of 27.

== Biography ==
Born in Czechoslovakia, Absolonová became a member of the Czech high diving national team, along with her younger sister Lucie (born 5 March 1979). She injured her spine when she was 20 years old in an accident when training for the 1996 Summer Olympics in Atlanta, diving from the 10m platform. She recovered from her injury, but did not qualify for the 2000 Sydney Olympics. Her problems persisted, so she retired from professional sports.

Absolonová was later persuaded by a photographer to pose nude and eventually to participate in the adult film industry.

As Lea De Mae, she appeared in over 80 adult films. She first appeared on American screens in a series of features for Private Media Group. She eventually returned to Europe, shooting more films, but after a short time returned to the United States.

Absolonová was diagnosed with glioblastoma, an aggressive form of brain cancer in July 2004. Fans and fellow porn actors contributed to a medical fund set up for her in Prague, but she died on 9 December 2004 at the age of 27.

== Feature film ==
Her Body (Czech: Její tělo) is a Czech-Slovak film by documentary filmmaker Natália Císařovská. It is her debut feature film. The film is a dramatization of Absolonová's life story. The film was supported by the State Cinematography Fund and the SK Audiovisual Fund.
