= The Old Blunderbuss Mystery =

2011 Czech television fantasy film

- DVD cover
- Tajemství staré bambitky
- Written by: Evžen Gogela; Miroslav Buberle; Ivo Macharáček
- Directed by: Ivo Macharáček
- Starring: Ondřej Vetchý; Kamila Janovičová; Tomáš Klus
- Music by: Lumír Hrma
- Country of origin: Czech Republic
- Original language: Czech

Production
- Cinematography: Tomáš Kresta
- Editor: Jiří Brožek
- Running time: 86 minutes
- Production company: Czech Television

Original release
- Release: 25 December 2011

The Old Blunderbuss Mystery (Czech: Tajemství staré bambitky) is a 2011 Czech television fantasy film directed by Ivo Macharáček.

== Cast ==
- Ondřej Vetchý as robber Jan Karaba
- Tomáš Klus as king Jakub
- Kamila Janovičová as Anička, Karaba's daughter
- Jan Čenský as king Vilém
- Tereza Kostková as queen Olivie
- Miroslav Vladyka as advisor Ferenc
- Jiří Lábus as advisor Lorenc
- Petr Štěpánek as chef Frit
- Zuzana Fialová as aunt Libuše
- Vilma Cibulková as housekeeper Hedvika
- Luděk Sobota as scribe
