= Natalia Germani =

Slovak actress (born 1993)

- Born: Natália Germaniová; 27 January 1993 (age 33); Nitra, Slovakia
- Education: Academy of Performing Arts in Bratislava
- Spouse: Martin Valihora
- Children: 2

Natalia Germani (born 27 January 1993) is a Slovak actress.

== Biography ==
Natalia Germani was born on 27 January 1993 as Natália Germaniová in Nitra. She originally wanted to be a medical doctor, but eventually decided to study acting at the Academy of Performing Arts in Bratislava. As a student she competed in the Miss Universe pageant.

Germani's is well known as a soap opera actress, having starred in Deň a Noc (2013), Dr. Ema (2014), Divoké Kone (2015), Panelák (2017), Alica (2018), Hranica (2022) and Iveta (2023).

Germani is also active as a stage actress, regularly appearing in plays of the GUnaGU theatre as well as the Slovak National Theatre.

Germani debuted as a movie actress in 2018, in the main role of the Czech movie Večne tvoja neverná. Her first main role was in the 2019 Czech drama Amnesty.

In 2022 she appeared as Alina in the horror moviesThe Devil Conspiracy and Nightsiren. For the later she was nominated for the Czech Lion and Sun in a Net awards.

In 2023 she played the Czech Olympic diver turned pornographic actress Andrea Absolonová in the movie Her Body, although pornographic actress Alexis Crystal doubled for her during a scene featuring penetrative sex. "For me, the boundary of intimacy is very crucial and it is very important for my life. I immediately told the director that there were certain things I wouldn't go through, and if it didn't suit her, we'd say goodbye."

In 2015 she changed her name to Natalia Germani, to make it more accessible for international audiences. In 2023 she was included in the 30 under 30 list by the Slovak edition of Forbes.

Germani is married to the musician Martin Valihora. They have two daughters.
