= Martin Finger =

Czech actor

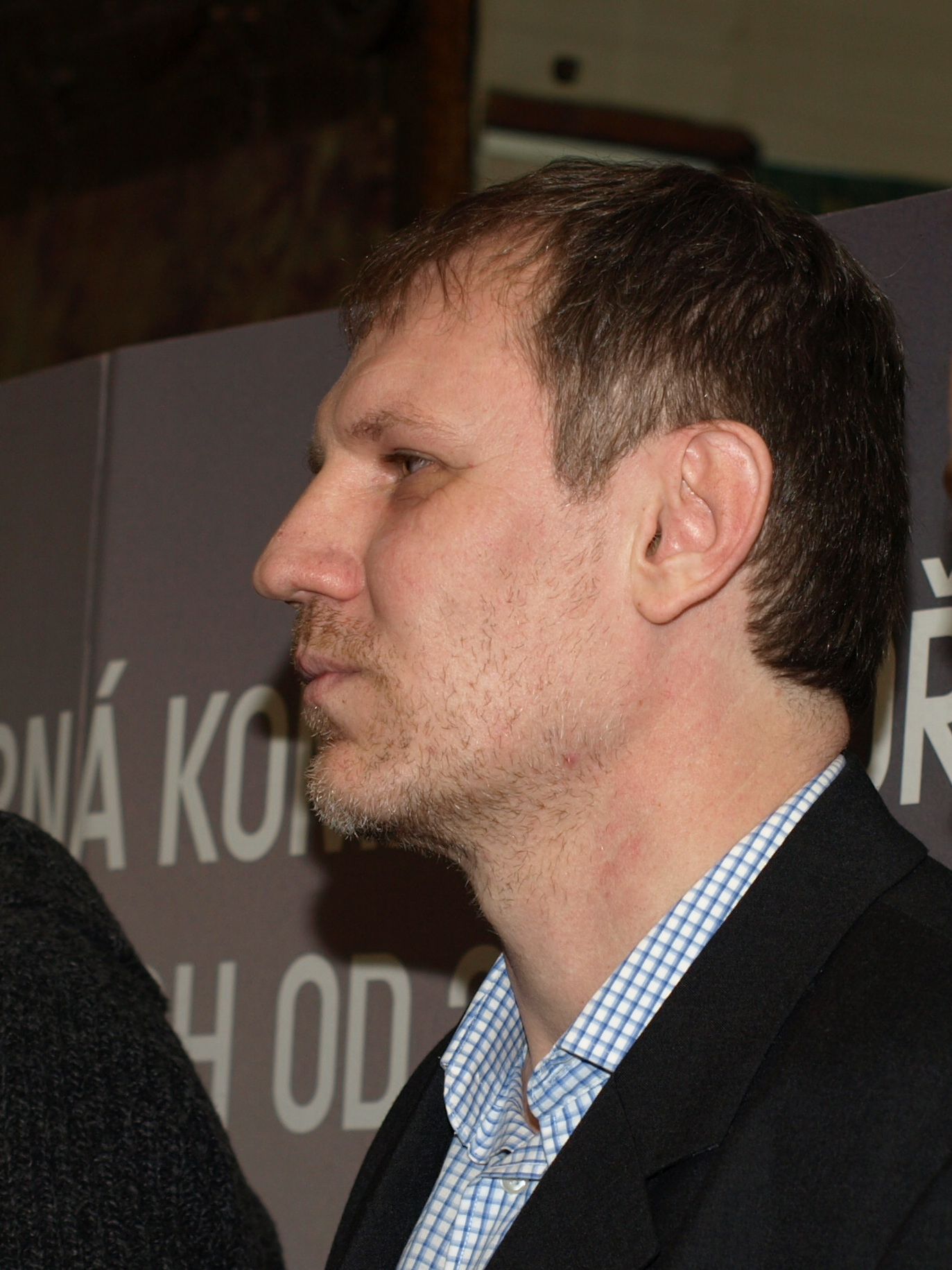
- Born: 16 December 1970 (age 55); Šumperk, Czechoslovakia
- Occupation: Actor
- Years active: 1997–present

Martin Finger (born 16 December 1970) is a Czech actor.

== Selected filmography ==
=== Film ===
- Walking Too Fast (2010)
- Long Live the Family! (2011)
- I, Olga Hepnarová (2016)
- Toman (2018)
- Metanol (2018)
- The Word (2022)
- The Body (2023)
- Her Drunken Diary (2024)

=== Television ===
- Ulice (2005)
- Spravedlnost (2017)
- Stockholm Syndrome (2020)
- Actor (2020)
- Božena (2021)
- Nineties (2022)
- Inspekce (2026)
