= One Man Show (web series) =

- Starring: Kamil Bartošek
- Country of origin: Czech Republic

Production
- Running time: 10–33 minutes

Original release
- Network: Stream.cz
- Release: 30 November 2008

One Man Show is a Czech web show broadcast on Stream.cz which began broadcasting on 30 November 2008. Kamil Bartošek known as Kazma Kazmitch is the presenter, producer and screenwriter. Markus Krug was the director and screenwriter was until 2020. The original format of the program was a peculiarly conceived talk show. In 2015, the show underwent a significant transformation as the genre of the show shifted towards a reality show focused on creating sophisticated pranks with an idea at the end. In 2018, it won 3 Golden Nutcracker awards and the Grand Prix at the Creative Awards 2018, the most prestigious ceremony in the Czech advertising world.

In 2020 crew of the show started working on a film based on the show which premiered on 17 August 2023.

== Episodes ==
Season	Episodes	First aired	Last aired
1	124	18 October 2008	13 November 2014
2	36	6 October 2015	27 September 2020
