= Hynek Čermák =

Czech actor

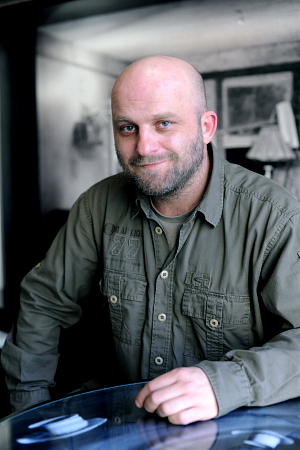
- Born: 19 February 1973 (age 52); Prague, Czechoslovakia
- Occupation: Actor
- Years active: 1993–present
- Spouse: Veronika Čermák Macková
- Children: 2

Hynek Čermák (born 19 February 1973) is a Czech actor.

== Selected filmography ==
=== Film ===
- Little Knights Tale (2009)
- Kajínek (2010)
- Men in Hope (2011)
- Innocence (2011)
- Gangster Ka (2015)
- Po strništi bos (2017)
- River Rascals (2017)
- National Street (2019)
- The Last Aristocrat (2019)
- Bet on Friendship (2021)
- Shadowplay (2022)
- Borders of Love (2022)
- Children of Nagano (2023)

=== Television ===
- Cirkus Bukowsky (2013)
- Až po uši (2014)
- Reportérky (2015)
- Rapl (2016)
- Dabing Street (2018)
- Zkáza Dejvického divadla (2019)
- Případ Roubal (2021)
