= Bontonfilm =

Czech film company

Bontonfilm is a Czech film company. It was founded in 1994 by transformation from Lucernafilm Video (successor of Ústřední půjčovna filmů).

As of 2022, Bontonfilm holds a 10.4% market share being 4th largest Czech distributor (behind Falcon a.s., Cinemart and Bioscop a.s.).

== History ==
Bontonfilm is linked with Bonton company that as founded in 1990 to produce music. Bonton eventually expanded to film industry and acquired Lucernafilm Video which became Bontonfilm. Bontonfilm quickly became biggest Czech film distributor with about 30% share of the market.

Bontonfilm managed to partner with major American studios including 20th Century Fox, DreamWorks Animation, Universal Pictures and Paramount. Bontonfilm distributed films by these studios in the Czech Republic. The main rival of Bontonfilm was Falcon a.s. which distributes films by Walt Disney Pictures and Columbia Pictures.

This changed in 2013, major American studios switched to Cinemart and Bontonfilm lost its position of strongest film distribution company of Czech market, falling to fourth place in the market.

== Films ==
=== Czech ===
Release date	Title	Notes
29 September 1994	Faust	
24 November 1994	The Order	
2 February 1995	Indian Summer	
30 March 1995	Too Loud a Solitude	
13 April 1995	In the Coat of Lioness' Arms	
11 May 1995	Golet in the Valley	
18 May 1995	Game of Chance	
9 December 1996	Forgotten Light	
29 January 1997	Boomerang	
4 March 1998	Helluva Good Luck	
27 May 1999	Which Side Eden	
7 December 2000	Wild Flowers	
19 April 2001	Ban From Paradise	
19 December 2002	Girlie	
22 January 2003	Good One	
9 December 2004	Lovers and Murderers	
7 July 2005	Close To Heaven	
21 September 2006	Pleasant Moments	
15 February 2007	Maharal- Tajemství Talismanu	
10 July 2008	Bathory	
1 September 2009	Absurdistán	
