= David Švehlík =

Czech actor (born 1972)

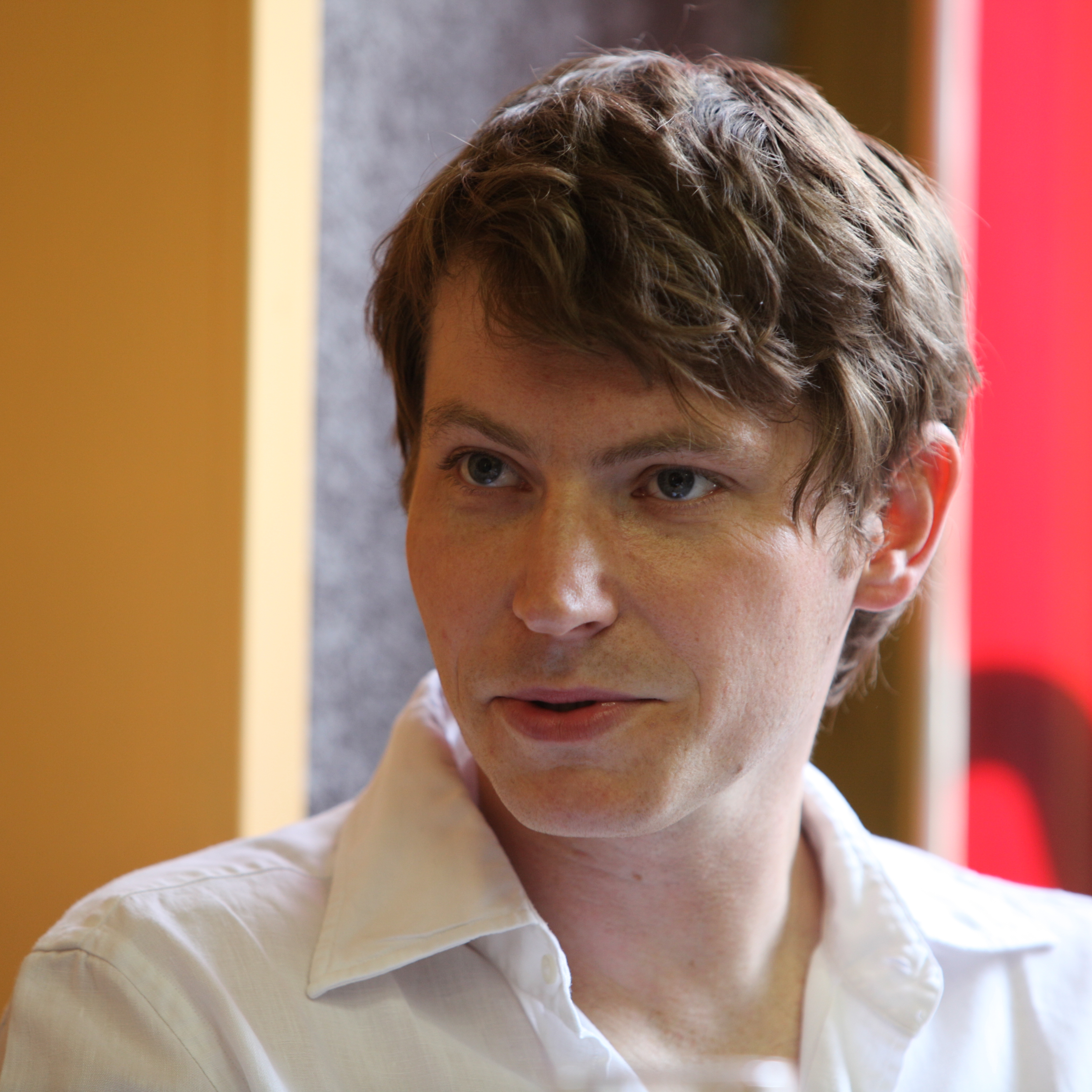
- David Švehlík at the KVIFF in 2009
- Born: 6 April 1972 (age 53); Liberec, Czechoslovakia
- Occupation: Actor
- Years active: 2002-present
- Spouse(s): Jitka Schneiderová (2004–2012); Vendula Švehlíková (2015–present)
- Children: 1
- Parent(s): Alois Švehlík; Florentina Švehlíková

David Švehlík (born 6 April 1972 in Liberec) is a Czech actor.

He starred in many Czech movies (including Operace Silver A under director Jiří Strach in 2007) and TV series (Kriminálka Anděl etc.)

His father Alois Švehlík was also an actor.
