= Kněževes =

Kněževes may refer to places in the Czech Republic:

- Kněževes (Blansko District), a municipality and village in the South Moravian Region
- Kněževes (Rakovník District), a market town in the Central Bohemian Region
- Kněževes (Prague-West District), a municipality and village in the Central Bohemian Region
- Kněževes (Žďár nad Sázavou District), a municipality and village in the Vysočina Region
