= Heřmanov =

Heřmanov may refer to places in the Czech Republic:

- Heřmanov (Děčín District), a municipality and village in the Ústí nad Labem Region
- Heřmanov (Žďár nad Sázavou District), a municipality and village in the Vysočina Region
- Heřmanov, a village and part of Kolešovice in the Central Bohemian Region
- Heřmanov, a village and part of Teplá in the Karlovy Vary Region
