= Semestr =

- Genre: Drama
- Directed by: Adam Sedlák
- Starring: Anna Linhartová
- Country of origin: Czech Republic
- Original language: Czech
- No. of seasons: 1
- No. of episodes: 6

Production
- Running time: 17-26 minutes

Original release
- Network: Stream.cz
- Release: November 13 – December 5, 2016

Semestr is a series of Stream.cz internet television. It tells the story of film science student Amália, whose boyfriend Damián goes to Berlin for six months on Erasmus. The series is basically filmed in such a way that the audience only sees what is happening on the computer monitors and phone displays of the heroes of the series.

== Cast ==
- Anna Linhartová as Amálie Němečková
- Jan Hofman as Damián Kadlec
- Eva Josefíková as Pavlína Stárková
- Jan Cina as Šimon Špaček
- Hermína Pogosyan as Nurhan
- Jarmila Mílová as mother Amálie
- Eva Hayek as Alžběta Bérová

== List of episodes ==
1. Září
2. Říjen
3. Listopad
4. Prosinec
5. Leden
6. Únor
