= Horní Slavkov =

- Town
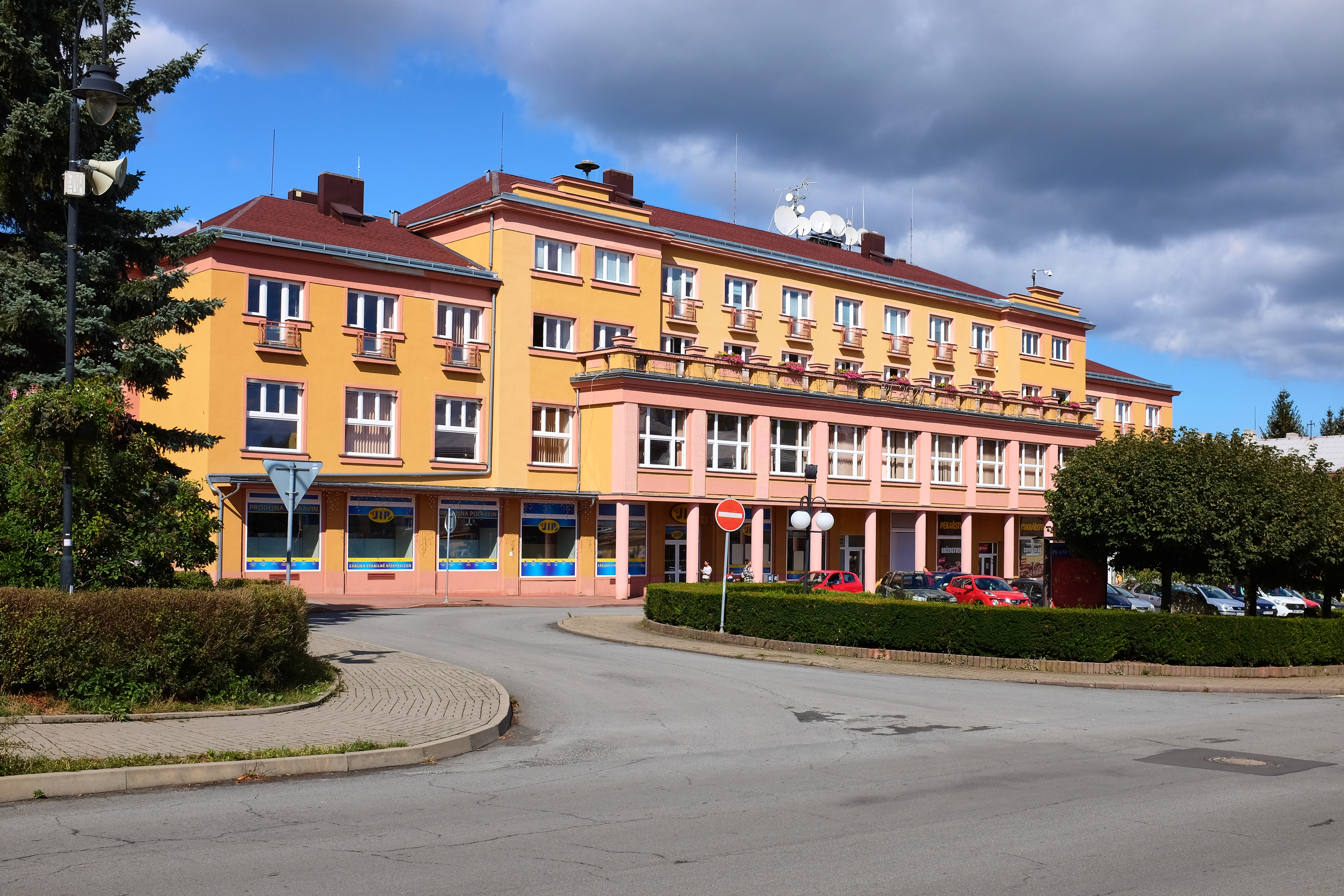
- Town hall

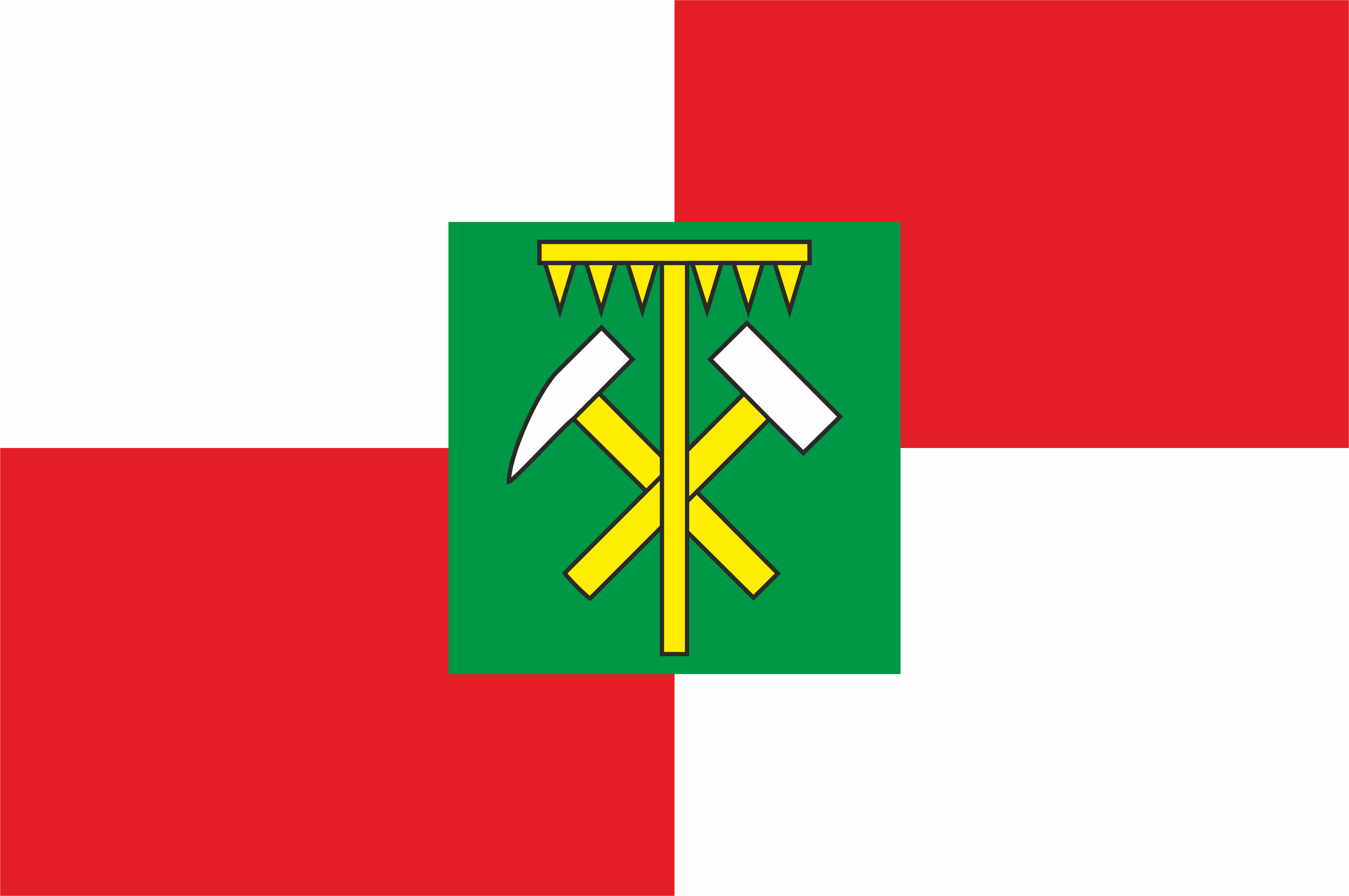
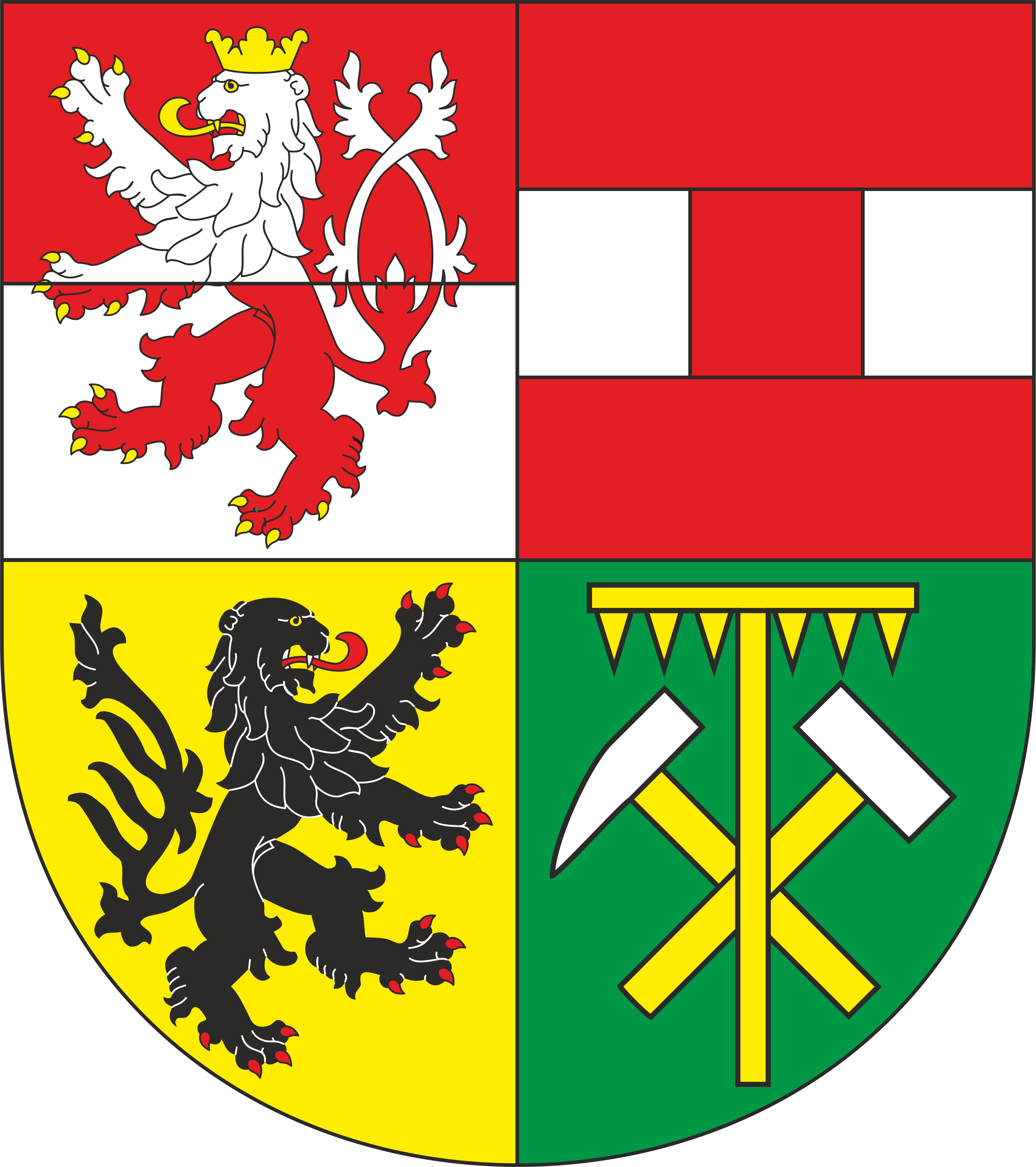
- Flag Coat of arms

- Location in the Czech Republic
- Coordinates: 50°8′19″N 12°47′59″E
- Country: Czech Republic
- Region: Karlovy Vary
- District: Sokolov
- First mentioned: 1335

Government
  - Mayor: Alexandr Terek

Area
  - Total: 36.87 km^{2} (14.24 sq mi)
- Elevation: 558 m (1,831 ft)

Population (2026-01-01)
  - Total: 5,071
  - Density: 137.5/km^{2} (356.2/sq mi)
- Time zone: UTC+1 (CET)
  - Summer (DST): UTC+2 (CEST)
- Postal code: 357 31
- Website: www.hornislavkov.cz

Horní Slavkov (Czech pronunciation: [ˈɦorɲiː ˈslafkof]; German: Schlaggenwald) is a town in Sokolov District in the Karlovy Vary Region of the Czech Republic. It has about 5,100 inhabitants. The town is located in the Slavkov Forest range, near the Teplá River.

Horní Slavkov was founded as a mining settlement at the beginning the 13th century. The historic town centre is well preserved and is protected by law as urban monument zone. The main landmark of the town is the Church of Saint George.

== Etymology ==
The name Slavkov is derived from the personal name of its founder, Slávek of Rýzmburk. The adjective horní means here 'mining' and states that it was a mining settlement.

== Geography ==
Horní Slavkov is located about 11 kilometres (7 mi) southeast of Sokolov and 11 km (7 mi) southwest of Karlovy Vary. It lies in the Slavkov Forest. The highest point is the hill Krudum at 838 m (2,749 ft) above sea level. The Teplá River flows along the eastern municipal border.

== History ==
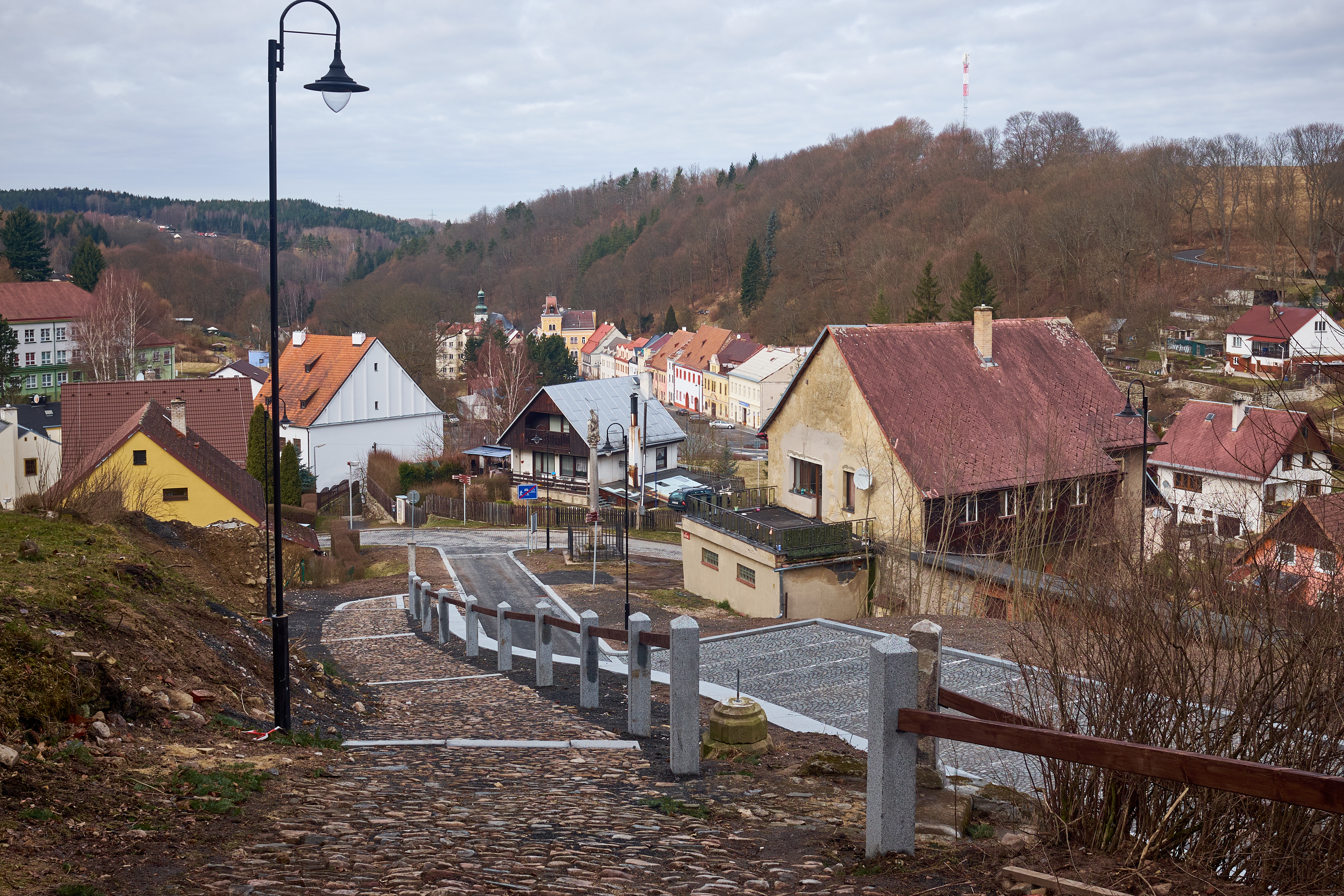
Historic town centre

A mining settlement was founded at the beginning of the 13th century. The first written mention of Horní Slavkov is from 1335, when it was named and extended into a small mining town. At the beginning of the 16th century, the town expanded and new residents came to it. Between 1494 and 1547, during the rule of the Pluh of Rabštejn family, Horní Slavkov became one of the largest mining towns thanks to the development of tin and silver ore mining. In 1547, it was promoted to a free mining town by Ferdinand I. The town became a centre of education and culture and there was also a Latin school.

At the beginning of the 17th century, there was a permanent decline in mining, due to which the population has decreased. The Thirty Years' War further deepened the crisis. After the war, there was a boom in craft guild production (tinsmithing, pottery and stove making). A temporary revival of mining occurred at the beginning of the 18th century. Manufactory production of textiles and haberdashery appeared. The first Czech porcelain began to be produced here, when the factory was established in 1792. It reached its greatest development in the 19th century and made the town famous in the world at that time.

== Demographics ==
Historical population

| Year | Pop. | ±% |
|---|---|---|
| 1869 | 5,374 | — |
| 1880 | 5,358 | −0.3% |
| 1890 | 5,363 | +0.1% |
| 1900 | 5,351 | −0.2% |
| 1910 | 4,927 | −7.9% |

| Year | Pop. | ±% |
|---|---|---|
| 1921 | 4,453 | −9.6% |
| 1930 | 4,294 | −3.6% |
| 1950 | 2,095 | −51.2% |
| 1961 | 5,669 | +170.6% |
| 1970 | 5,478 | −3.4% |

| Year | Pop. | ±% |
|---|---|---|
| 1980 | 6,106 | +11.5% |
| 1991 | 6,101 | −0.1% |
| 2001 | 5,972 | −2.1% |
| 2011 | 6,089 | +2.0% |
| 2021 | 5,751 | −5.6% |

Source: Censuses

== Economy ==
Porcelain production continued until 2011, when the factory was closed. In the 20th century, Horní Slavkov was also known for uranium mining. Today, the town is mainly a tourist centre.

== Transport ==
The I/20 road (part of the European route E49) from Plzeň to Karlovy Vary runs along the eastern municipal border.

Horní Slavkov is connected by a short railway connection with Krásný Jez, from where the trains go to other towns. However, the track is in operation only on weekends.

== Sights ==
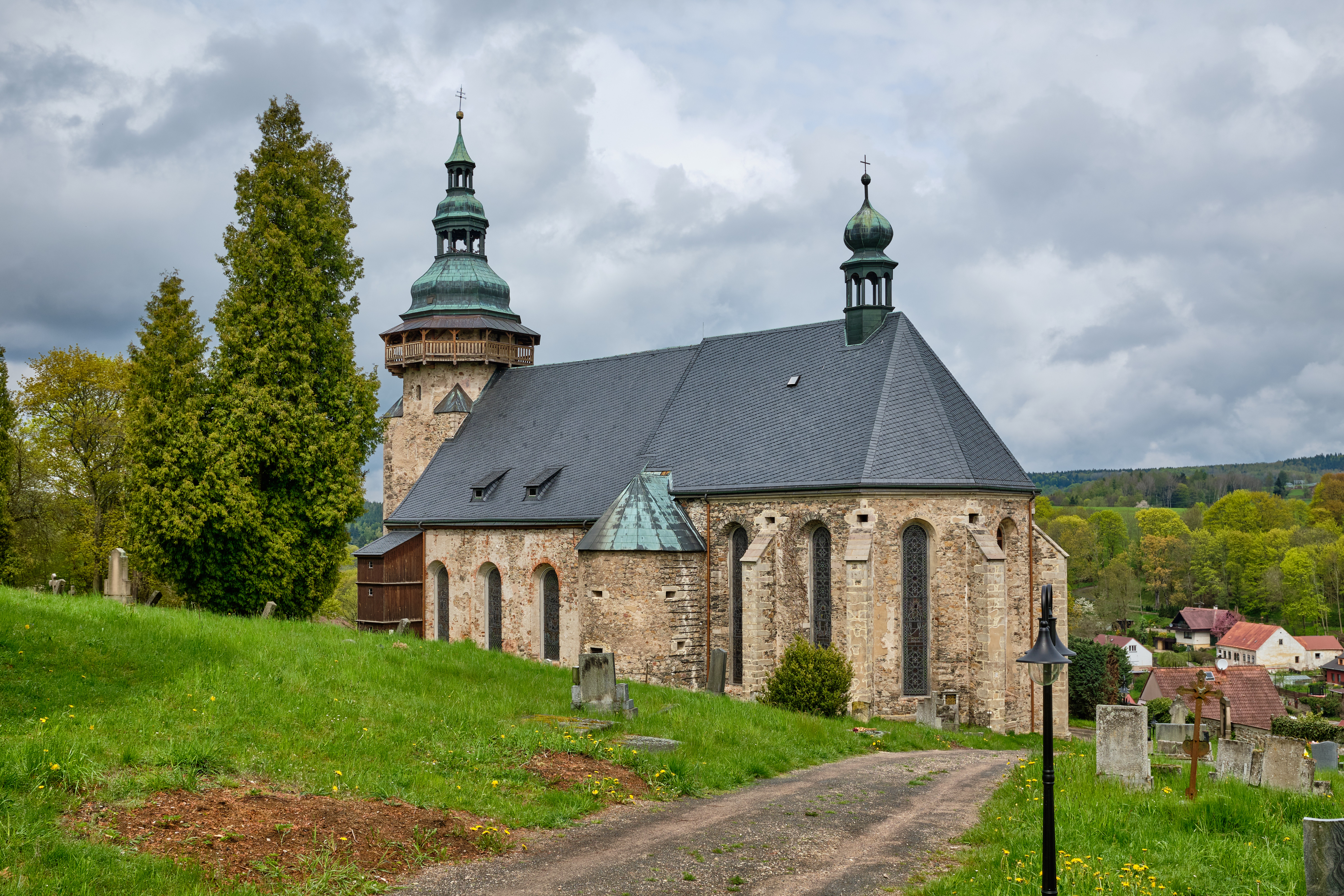
Church of Saint George

The main landmark of the town and its most valuable building is the Church of Saint George. It was built in the late Gothic style in 1518–1520 and was fortified. The church complex also includes a free-standing stone bell tower and the Baroque building of the former deanery, built in 1755–1756.

== Twin towns – sister cities ==
Horní Slavkov is twinned with:

- Arzberg, Germany
- Rosenbach, Germany
- Sławków, Poland
