= Mariánské Lázně =

- Town
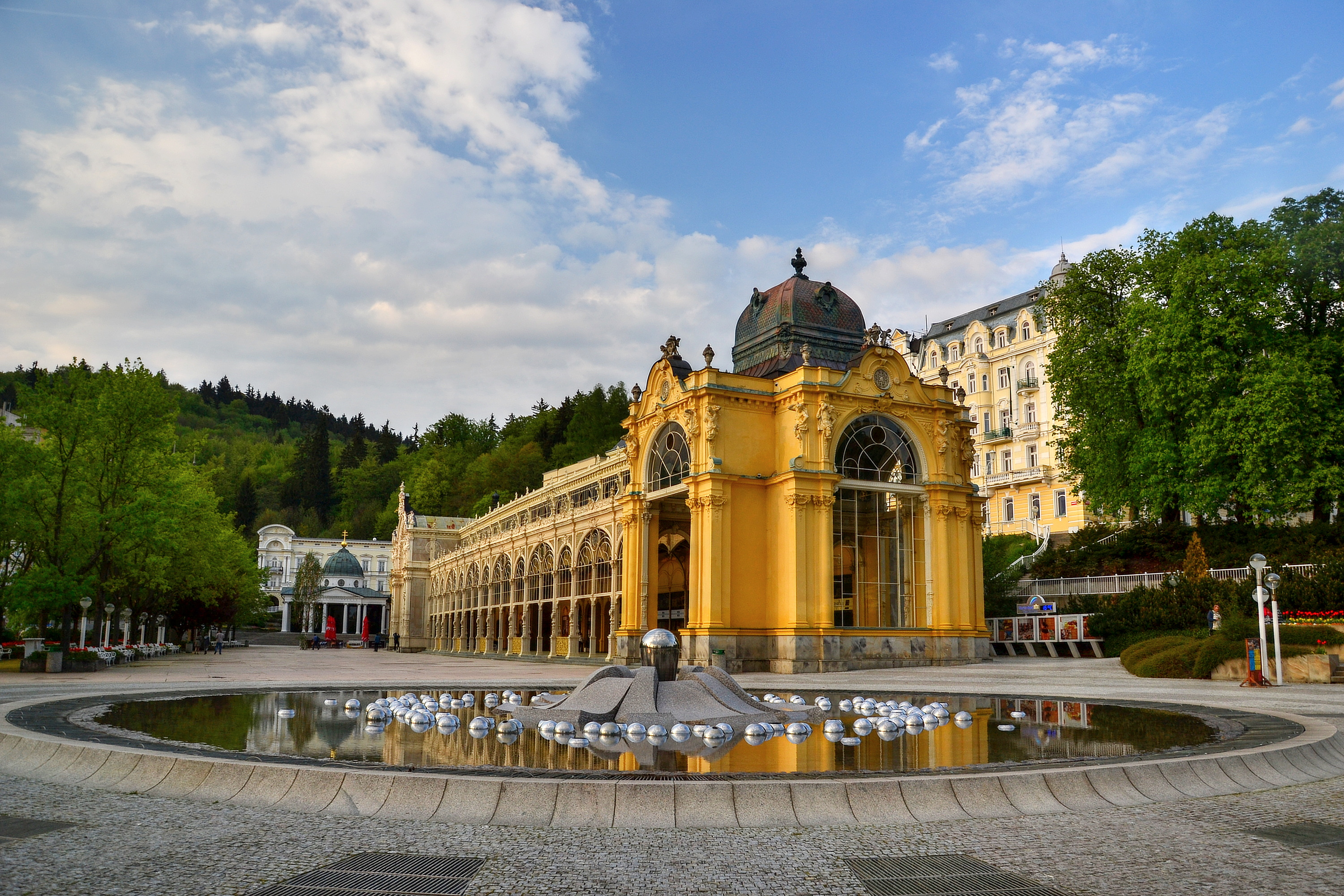
- Colonnade with Singing Fountain

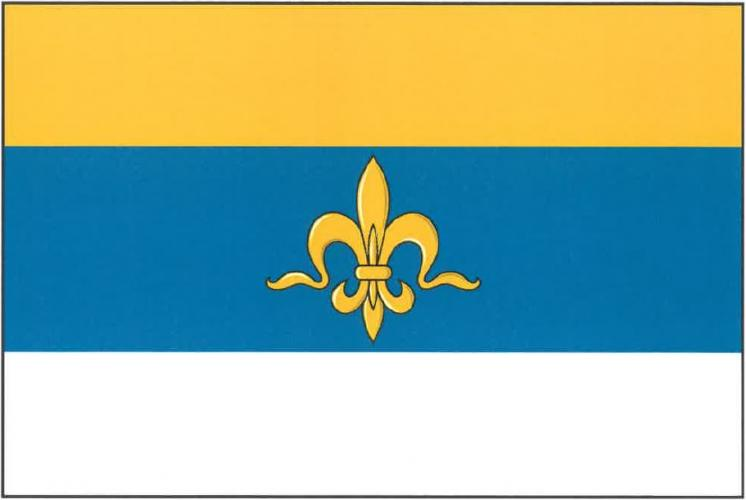
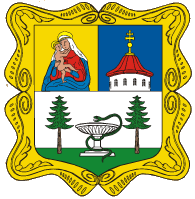
- Flag Coat of arms

- Location in the Czech Republic
- Coordinates: 49°57′53″N 12°42′4″E
- Country: Czech Republic
- Region: Karlovy Vary
- District: Cheb
- First mentioned: 1273

Government
  - Mayor: Martin Hurajčík (ANO)

Area
  - Total: 51.79 km^{2} (20.00 sq mi)
- Elevation: 578 m (1,896 ft)

Population (2026-01-01)
  - Total: 13,921
  - Density: 268.8/km^{2} (696.2/sq mi)
- Time zone: UTC+1 (CET)
  - Summer (DST): UTC+2 (CEST)
- Postal code: 353 01
- Website: www.marianskelazne.cz

UNESCO World Heritage Site
- Part of: The Great Spa Towns of Europe
- Criteria: Cultural: (ii)(iii)
- Reference: 1613
- Inscription: 2021 (44th Session)

Mariánské Lázně (Czech pronunciation: [ˈmarɪjaːnskɛː ˈlaːzɲɛ]; German: Marienbad) is a spa town in Cheb District in the Karlovy Vary Region of the Czech Republic. It has about 14,000 inhabitants. The town proper is located on the border between the Teplá Highlands and Podčeskoleská Hills, in the Slavkovský les Protected Landscape Area. Mariánské Lázně is a railway junction and a popular holiday resort.

Most of the town's buildings come from its Golden Era in the second half of the 19th century, when many celebrities and top European rulers came to enjoy the curative carbon dioxide springs. The town centre with the spa cultural landscape is well preserved and is protected as an urban monument reservation. In 2021, the town became part of the transnational UNESCO World Heritage Site under the name "Great Spa Towns of Europe" because of its springs and architectural testimony to the popularity of spa towns in Europe during the 18th through 20th centuries.

== Administrative division ==
Mariánské Lázně consists of six municipal parts (in brackets population according to the 2021 census):

- Mariánské Lázně (5,037)
- Chotěnov-Skláře (109)
- Hamrníky (661)
- Kladská (32)
- Stanoviště (71)
- Úšovice (6,069)

== Etymology ==
Both the initial German name Marienbad and the Czech name Mariánské Lázně mean 'Mary's spa'. It was originally the name of a mineral spring, near which the pious people hung an image of the Virgin Mary.

== Geography ==
Mariánské Lázně is located about 25 kilometres (16 mi) southeast of Cheb and 55 km (34 mi) southwest of Karlovy Vary. The municipal territory extends into three geomorphological regions: the eastern part lies in a hilly landscape of the Teplá Highlands, the southwestern part with most of the built-up area lies in a flat area of the Podčeskoleská Hills, and the northern tip lies in the Slavkov Forest. Most of the territory lies in the Slavkovský les Protected Landscape Area.

The Teplá River originates in the woods in the northeastern part of the municipal territory. The stream Kosový potok flows through the southern part of Mariánské Lázně. Its tributary, the stream Úšovický potok, flows through the town proper.

== History ==
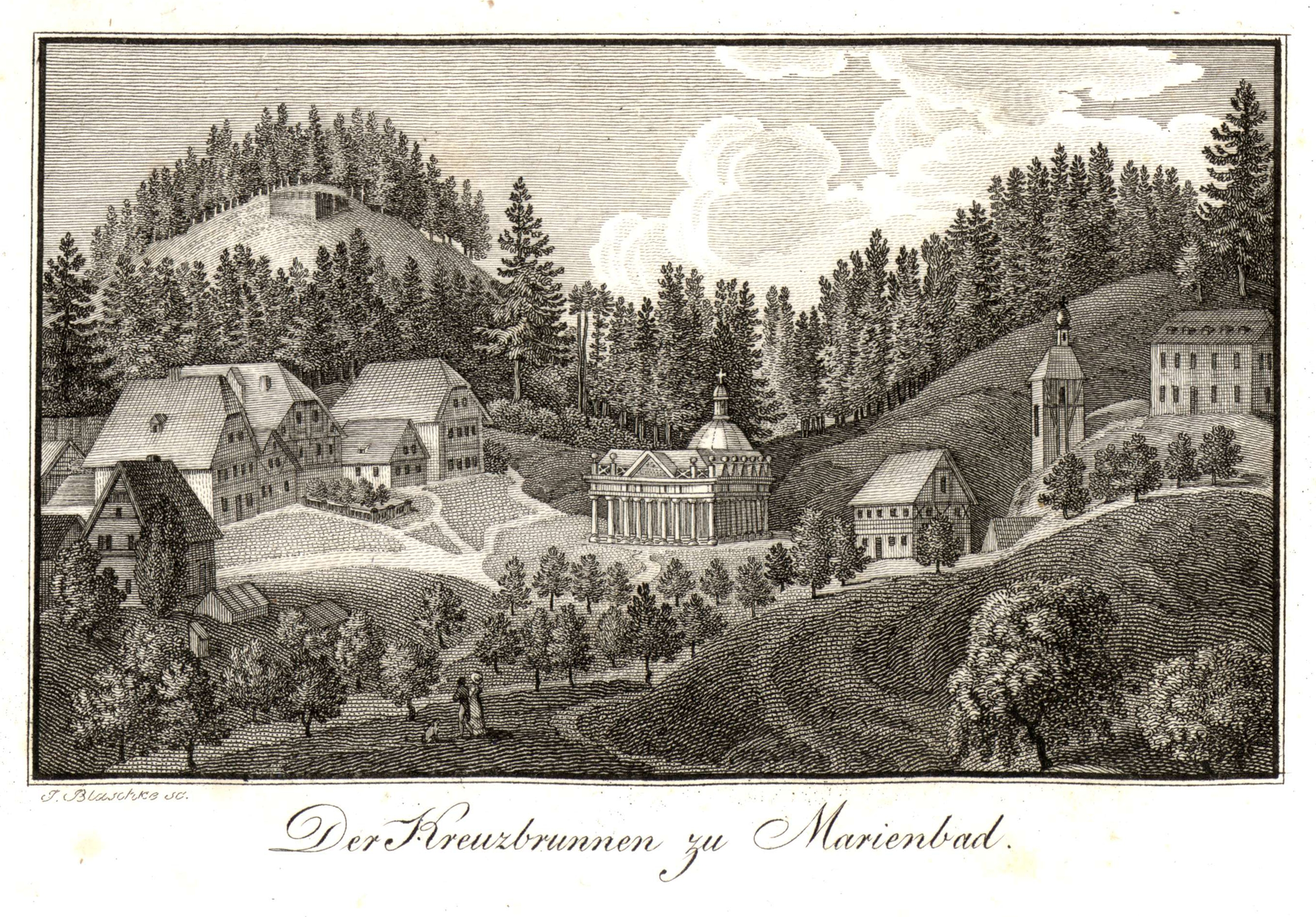
Mariánské Lázně, 1815, copper engraving

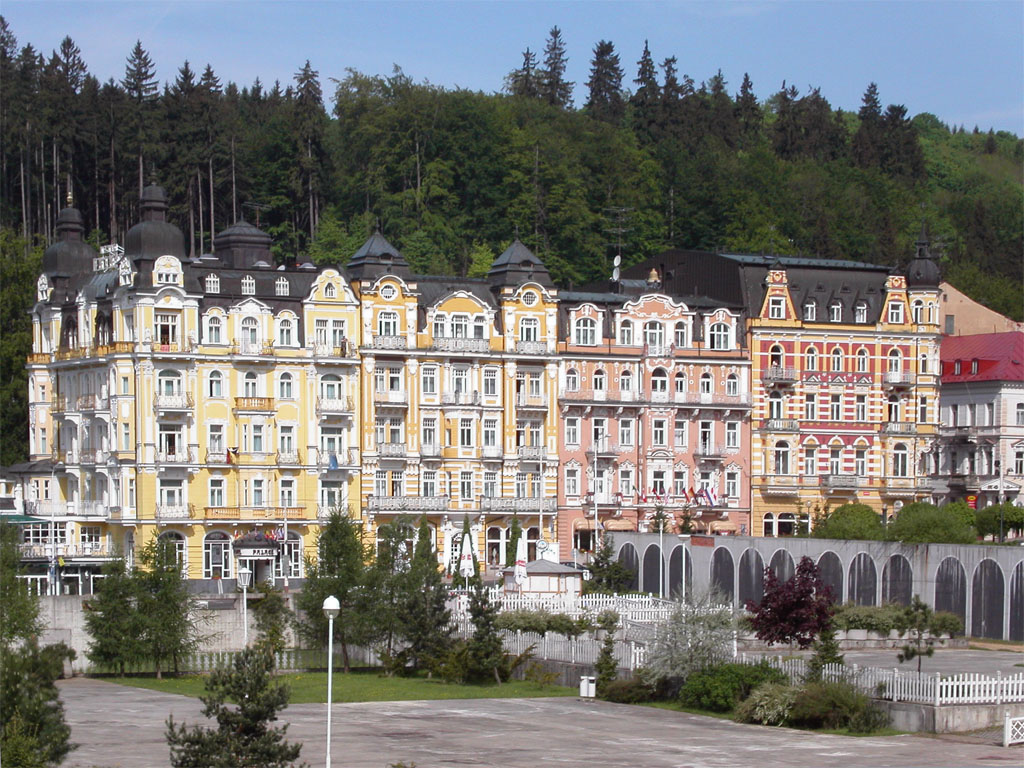
Typical buildings in the town centre

German settlers were called into this region by Bohemian rulers from the Přemyslid dynasty in the 12th century.

Although the town itself is only about two hundred years old, the locality has been inhabited much longer. The first written mention is from 1273, when there was the village of Úšovice. The springs first appear in a document dating from 1341 where they are called "the Auschowitzer springs" belonging to the Teplá Abbey. It was only through the efforts of Josef Nehr, the abbey's physician, who from 1779 until his death in 1820 worked hard to demonstrate the curative properties of the springs, that the waters began to be used for medicinal purposes. The place obtained its current name of Marienbad in 1808; became a watering-place in 1818, and was promoted to a town in 1868.

By the early 20th century, approximately 1,000,000 bottles of mineral water were exported annually from Marienbad. The water from the Cross Spring (Kreuzquelle/Křížový pramen) was evaporated and the final product was sold as a laxative under the name of sal teplensis. The modern spa town was founded by the Teplá abbots, namely Karl Kaspar Reitenberger, who also bought some of the surrounding forests to protect them. The inhospitable marshland valley was changed into a park-like countryside with colonnades, Neoclassical buildings and pavilions around the springs.

The name Marienbad first appeared in 1786; since 1865 it has been a town. Then came a second period of growth, the town's Golden Era. Between 1870 and 1914 many new hotels, colonnades and other buildings were constructed or rebuilt from older houses. In 1872, the town got a railway connection with the town of Cheb and thus with the whole Austria-Hungary and the rest of Europe.

The town soon became one of the top European spas, popular with notable figures and rulers who often returned there. At that time, about 20,000 visitors came every year. It was also a popular resort and vacation venue for European rabbis and their Hasidic followers, accommodating their needs with kosher restaurants, religious prayer services, etc.

Marienbad remained a popular destination between World War I and World War II. After World War II, the town's German-speaking population was expelled according to the Potsdam Agreement, thereby emptying the town of the majority of its population. Afterwards, the Czechoslovak authorities repopulated the town with Czechs from the hinterland. After the communist coup d'état of 1948, it was sealed off from most of its foreign visitors. After the return of democracy in 1989 much effort was put into restoring the town to its original character. Today it is a spa town and a popular holiday resort thanks to its location inside a protected landscape area, sports facilities (the town's first golf course was opened in 1905 by the British King Edward VII) and the proximity to other spa towns, such as Karlovy Vary (Karlsbad) and Františkovy Lázně (Franzensbad).

== Demographics ==
Historical population

Year	Pop.	±%
1869	2,582	—
1880	4,075	+57.8%
1890	5,012	+23.0%
1900	6,459	+28.9%
1910	9,173	+42.0%

Year	Pop.	±%
1921	10,183	+11.0%
1930	11,862	+16.5%
1950	9,261	−21.9%
1961	12,882	+39.1%
1970	13,559	+5.3%

Year	Pop.	±%
1980	14,930	+10.1%
1991	15,382	+3.0%
2001	14,741	−4.2%
2011	12,906	−12.4%
2021	11,979	−7.2%

Source: Censuses

== Transport ==
Mariánské Lázně is located on three important railway lines: Prague–Cheb, Plzeň–Karlovy Vary and Františkovy Lázně–Bohumín.

Mariánské Lázně Airport is situated on the southern border of the town.

=== Public transport ===
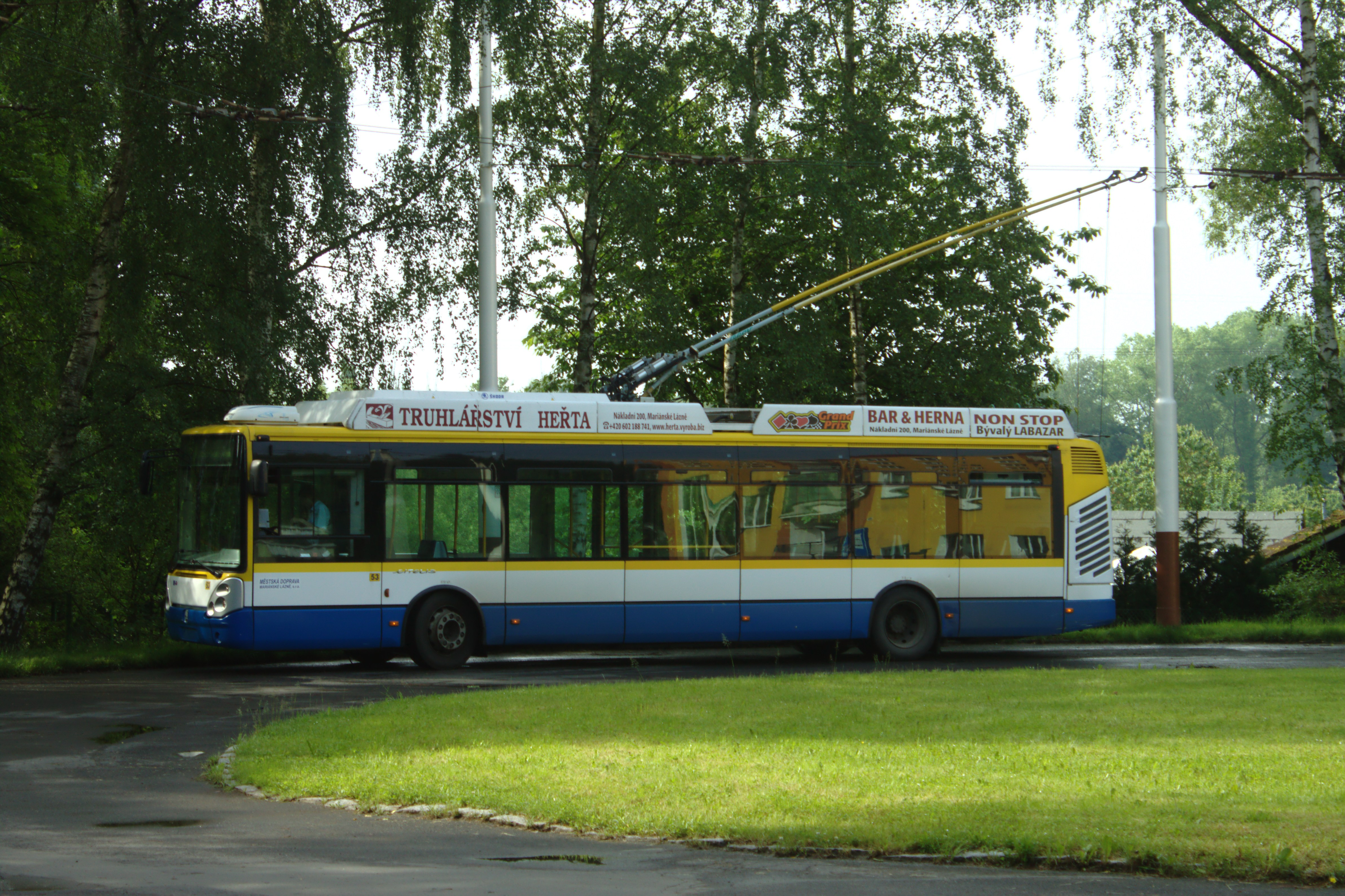
Trolleybus in Mariánské Lázně near the natural spring Antoníčkův pramen

The town's public transport is operated mainly by trolleybuses and accompanied by buses servicing the neighbouring villages. There are four trolleybus lines and four bus lines in operation.

== Sport ==
The town is represented by the football team FC Viktoria Mariánské Lázně, founded in 1945. It plays in lower amateur tiers.

Mariánské Lázně has a motorcycle speedway racing circuit. The venue, Mariánské Lázně Longtrack Speedway, hosted six Long Track World Champion finals from 1976 to 1994 and five rounds of Grand-Prix racing (the most recent in 2011).

The town is known for the Royal Golf Club Mariánské Lázně.

== Sights ==
=== Mineral springs and colonnades ===
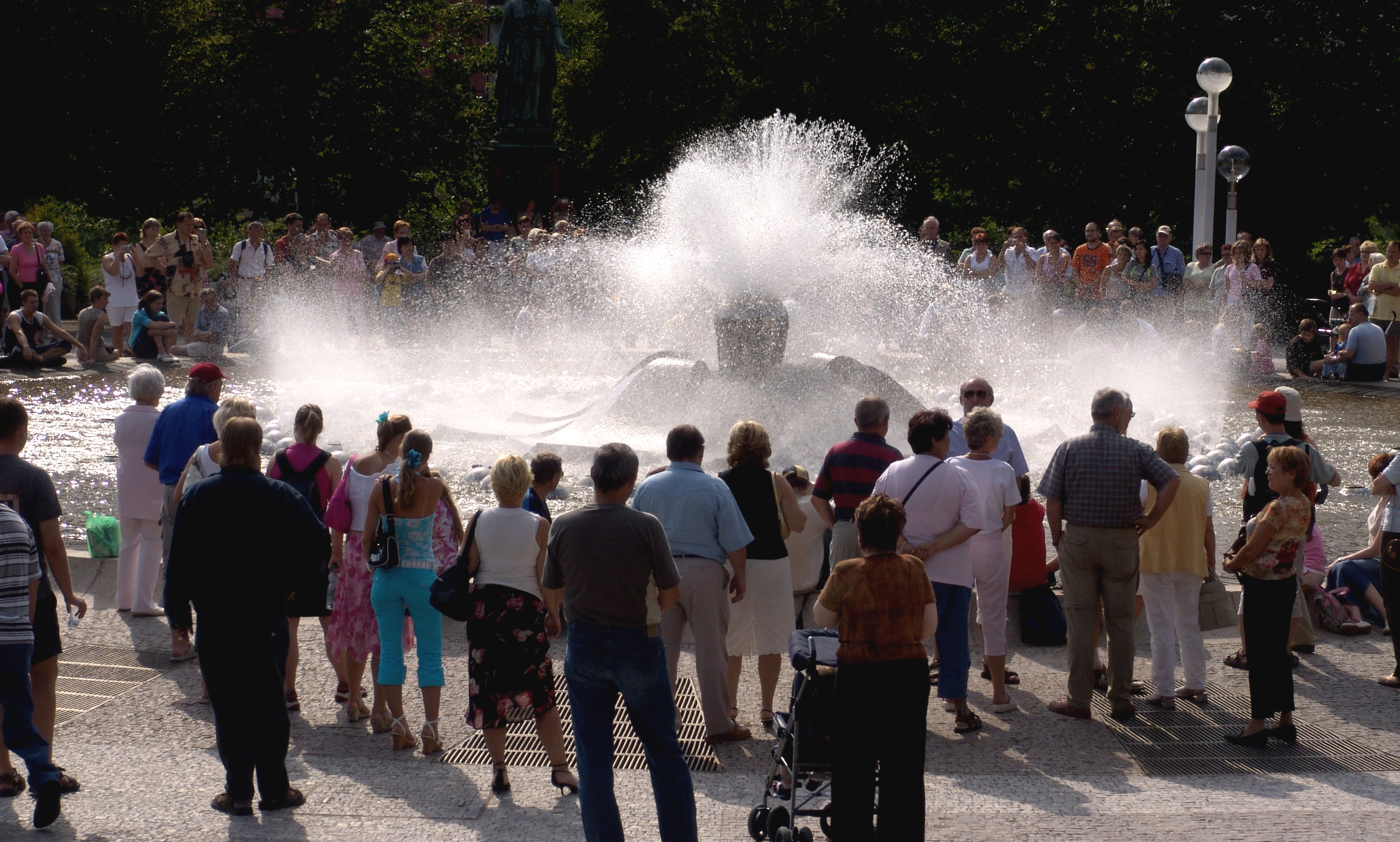
Singing Fountain

The top attraction of the town is its 100 mineral springs (53 of them are tapped) with high carbon dioxide content and often also higher iron content, both in the town itself (40 springs) and its surroundings. The water in the springs has an average temperature of 7–10 °C, and is formed through interactions with the deep fault lines that run under the region. The mineral water is claimed to cure disorders of the kidneys and of the urinary tract, respiratory disorders, locomotive system disorders, metabolic disorders, oncological disorders and gynaecological disorders, including the treatment of sterility.

Many of the springs have pavilions and colonnades built around them. Among them are:

- Křížový pramen (Cross Spring) – a monumental pavilion with a cupola bearing a patriarchal cross and 72 Ionic columns was built over the spring in 1818–1826. Today's concrete building is a copy from 1911–1912, originally it was a light wooden and brick construction. The water from the spring is highly mineralised with a strong laxative effect, and has been used for both curative drinks and baths.
- Rudolfův pramen (Rudolph's Spring) – with a wooden pavilion built over the spring, some water is tapped and piped to the nearby colonnade and some is bottled. Its water is weakly mineralised with high calcium content and has been used to cure urinary problems.
- Karolinin pramen (Caroline's Spring) – named after the wife of the Emperor Francis I, Caroline Augusta. The nearby colonnade was built in 1869, the pavilion is a reconstruction from 1989. The water is weakly mineralised, with higher magnesium content.
- Ferdinandův pramen (Ferdinand's Spring) – the water from the spring, similar in composition to Křížový pramen, is bottled under the Excelsior label.
- Ambrožovy prameny (Ambrose's Springs)
- Lesní pramen (Forest Spring)
- Zpívající fontána (Singing Fountain)

The total yield of all of the springs is roughly 600 litres per minute.

=== Churches ===
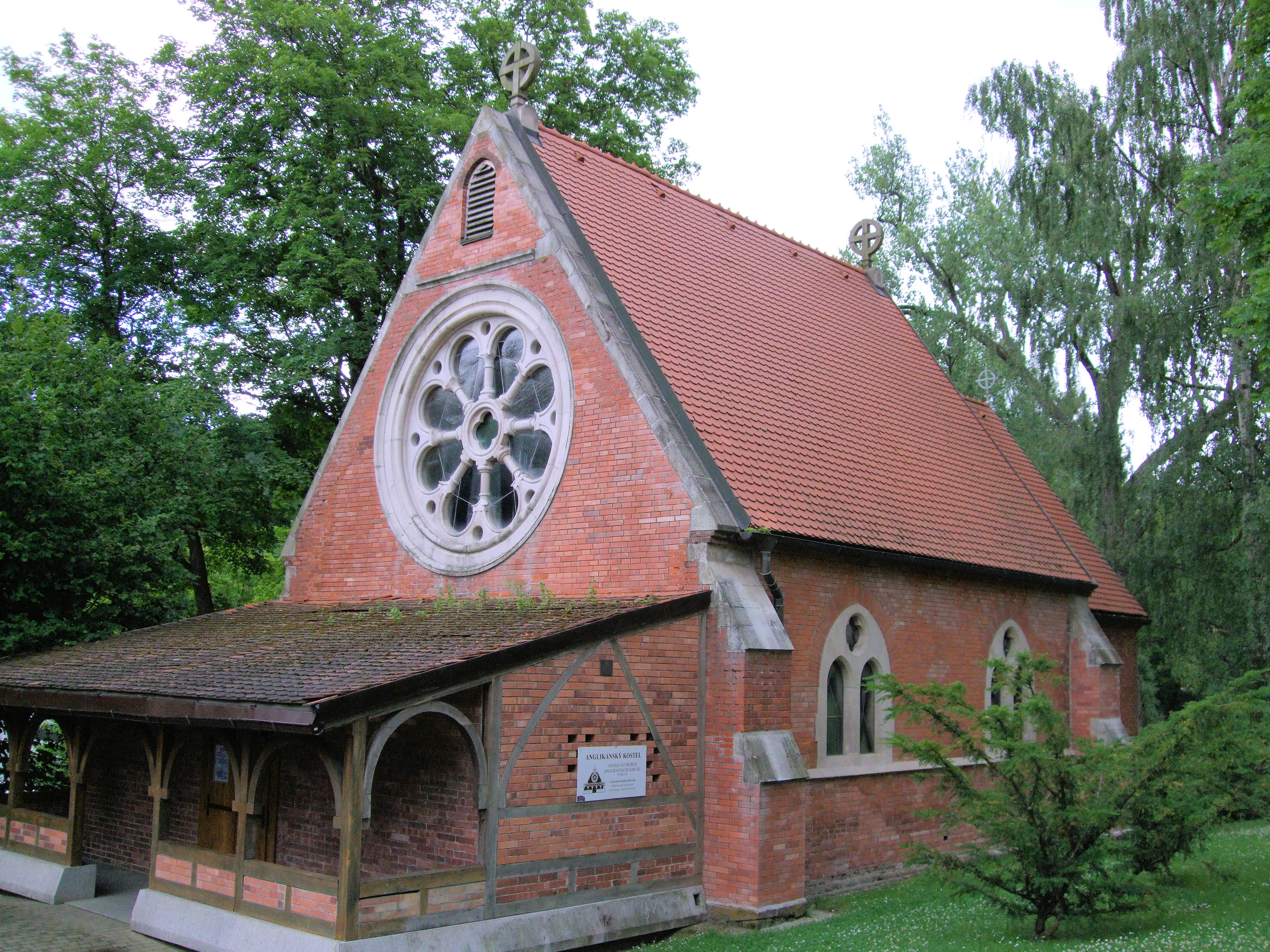
View of the Anglican Church

Because of the diverse number of visitors, the town is able to maintain churches of several denominations. These include the Anglican Church designed by the notable Victorian architect William Burges and founded by Lady Anna Scott in memory of her husband who died in Mariánské Lázně in 1867. The church was constructed in 1879, shortly before Burges's own death. It is no longer in use as a place of worship and is now a concert hall.

== Notable people ==
- Maurice Loewy (1833–1907), astronomer
- Werner Stark (1909–1985), sociologist and economist
- Eduard Petiška (1924–1987), poet and author
- Peter Hofmann (1944–2010), German tenor
- Alex Čejka (born 1970), golfer
- Jakub Flek (born 1992), ice hockey player

=== Notable visitors ===
A number of notable people visited Mariánské Lázně, among them:

- Edward VII, British King; took annual holidays here
- Franz Joseph I, Austrian Emperor
- Nicholas II, Russian Emperor
- Frederick Augustus III, King of Saxony
- Winston Churchill, British Prime Minister
- George S. Patton, General of the United States Army
- Johann Wolfgang von Goethe, German writer and statesman
- Tomáš Garrigue Masaryk, president of Czechoslovakia
- Edvard Beneš, president of Czechoslovakia
- Frédéric Chopin, Polish composer
- Alfred Nobel, Swedish innovator
- Richard Wagner, German composer
- Friedrich Nietzsche, German philosopher
- Mark Twain, American author
- Thomas Edison, American inventor
- Emmy Destinn, operatic soprano
- Jacky Fisher, British admiral
- Franz Kafka, German-language Jewish Czech writer
- Gustav Mahler, Austrian composer

== Twin towns – sister cities ==
Mariánské Lázně is twinned with:

- Bad Homburg vor der Höhe, Germany
- Chianciano Terme, Italy
- Kiryat Motzkin, Israel
- Malvern, England, United Kingdom
- Marcoussis, France
- Weiden in der Oberpfalz, Germany

== In culture ==
Johann Wolfgang von Goethe named the poem Marienbad Elegy (1823) after the town.

Among the films and TV series that were shot in Mariánské Lázně are Music from Mars (1955), Thirty Cases of Major Zeman (1978), Dobrodružství kriminalistiky (1989), Dáma a Král (2017) and Army of Thieves (2021). The French film Last Year at Marienbad (1961) bears the German name of the town in its name, but no filming was done in Mariánské Lázně.
