= Jan Cina =

Czech actor (born 1988)

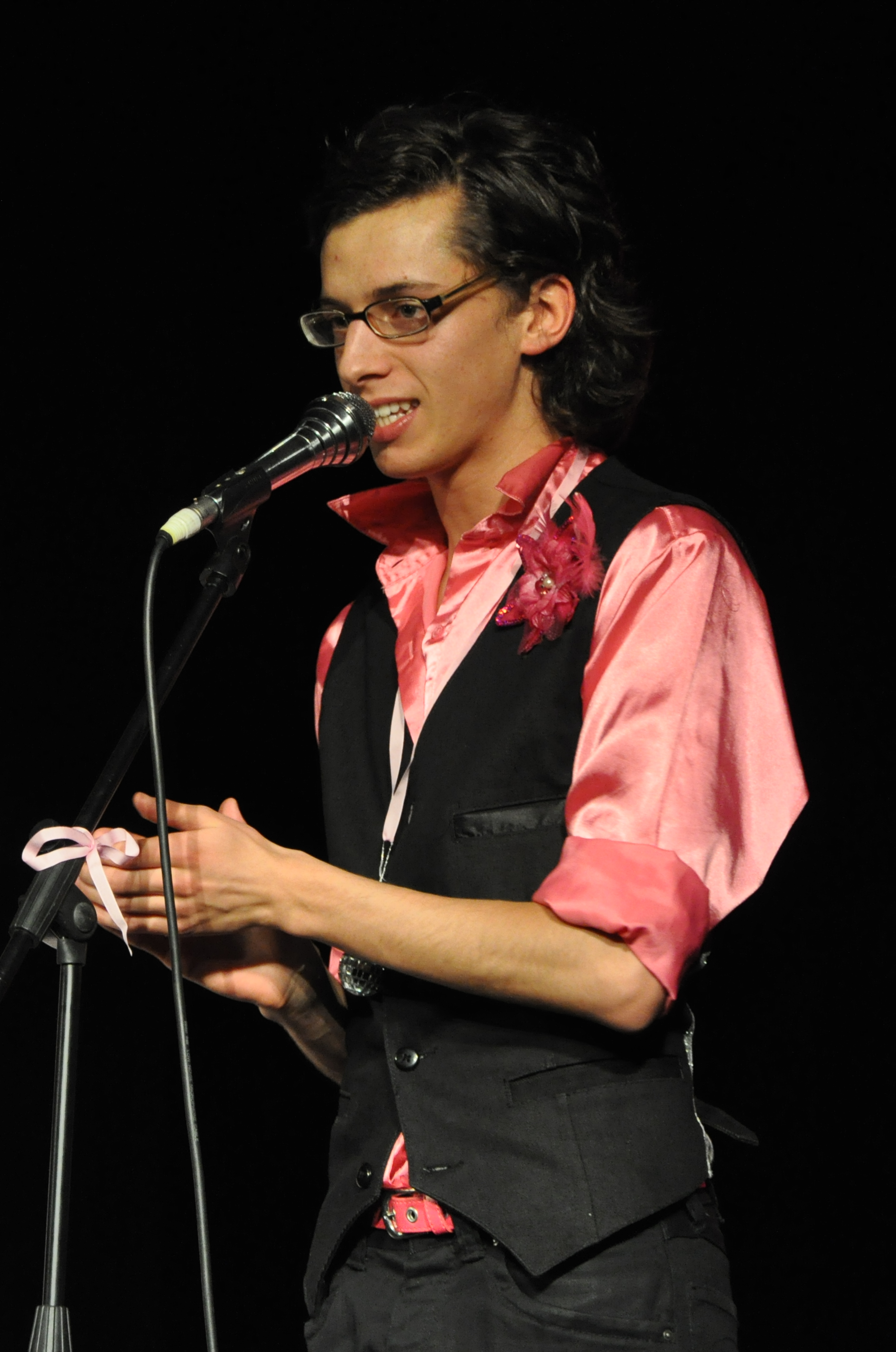
- Cina performing in 2009.
- Born: 20 March 1988 (age 38); Prague, Czechoslovakia
- Occupations: Actor; dancer; singer
- Years active: 2002–present

Jan Cina (born 20 March 1988) is a Czech actor and singer of Romani descent. He has an acclaimed career as a dancer, actor and vocalist in the Czech Republic.

== Biography ==
Cina, a Prague native, was born of Romani descent, in a Czech-Romani family. In his early youth, he showed an interest in acting. In 2002, he starred in the movie Smradi, aged 14. In 2007, he finished acting academy in Prague, and later landed a role in the Czech TV series Pustina, which gained him notoriety in the country. He won the 2016 reality competition Tvoje tvář má známý hlas, the Czech version of Your Face Sounds Familiar. Cina with his professional partner Adriana Mašková won the 2021 reality dance competition StarDance, the Czech version of Dancing with the Stars.

Jan Cina is openly gay.

He has performed in several Theatre Studio DVA productions including Šíleně smutná princezna and The Little Prince.

== Filmography ==
=== Film ===
- Smradi (2002) as Lukáš, older son
- National Street (2019) as Psycho
- Buko (2022) as Tomáš, Jarmila's son
- Chica Checa (2026) as Lukáš

=== Television series ===
- Wasteland (2016) as Lukáš Vašíček
- Semestr (2016) as Šimon Špaček
- Svět pod hlavou (2017) as young Josef Šejba
- Dáma a Král (2018) as Jiří Mladý
- Actor (2020) as Standa Láník
