= Teplá =

- Town
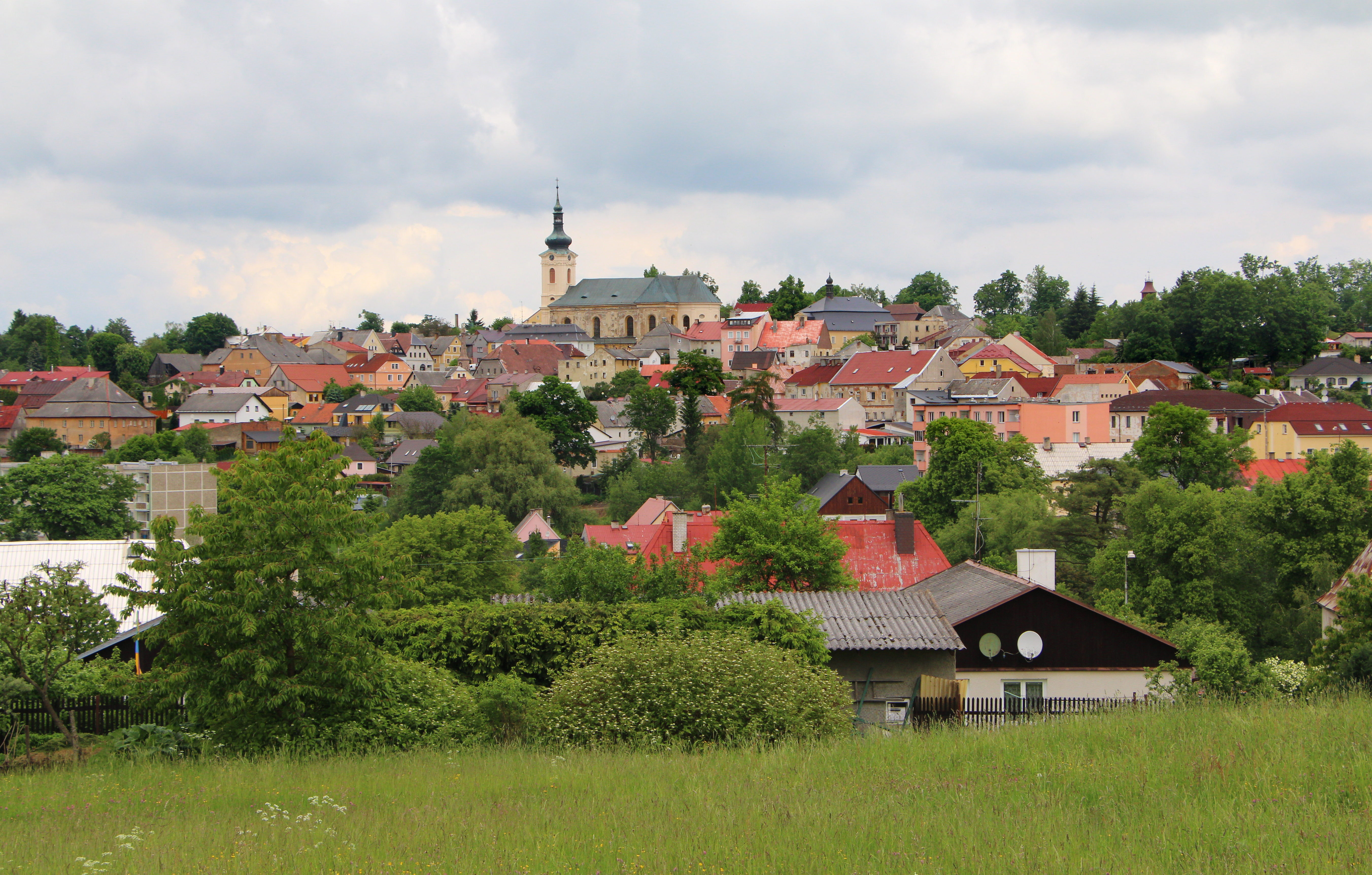
- View from the south

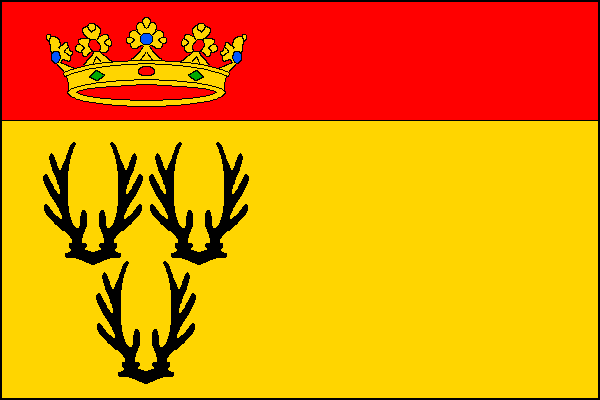
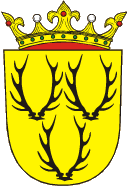
- Flag Coat of arms

- Location in the Czech Republic
- Coordinates: 49°58′55″N 12°51′47″E
- Country: Czech Republic
- Region: Karlovy Vary
- District: Cheb
- First mentioned: 1197

Government
  - Mayor: Karel Hermann

Area
  - Total: 113.21 km^{2} (43.71 sq mi)
- Elevation: 690 m (2,260 ft)

Population (2026-01-01)
  - Total: 2,909
  - Density: 25.70/km^{2} (66.55/sq mi)
- Time zone: UTC+1 (CET)
  - Summer (DST): UTC+2 (CEST)
- Postal code: 364 61
- Website: www.tepla.cz

Teplá (Czech pronunciation: [ˈtɛplaː]; German: Tepl) is a town in Cheb District in the Karlovy Vary Region of the Czech Republic. It has about 2,900 inhabitants. The town is located on the Teplá River in the Teplá Highlands.

Teplá was founded in the 1190s. The historic town centre is well preserved and is protected by law as urban monument zone. The main landmark of the town is the Teplá Abbey, which is protected as a national cultural monument.

== Administrative division ==
Teplá consists of 24 municipal parts (in brackets population according to the 2021 census):

- Teplá (2,159)
- Babice (20)
- Beranov (37)
- Beranovka (10)
- Beroun (22)
- Bezvěrov (3)
- Bohuslav (12)
- Číhaná (8)
- Heřmanov (41)
- Horní Kramolín (13)
- Hoštěc (21)
- Jankovice (6)
- Kladruby (31)
- Klášter (123)
- Křepkovice (32)
- Mrázov (51)
- Nezdice (3)
- Pěkovice (43)
- Popovice (31)
- Poutnov (85)
- Rankovice (14)
- Služetín (59)
- Staré Sedlo (26)
- Zahrádka (9)

== Etymology ==
The name Teplá means 'warm' in Czech. The town was named after the Teplá River that flows through it, which is known for its warm water and thermal springs in its lower course.

== Geography ==
Teplá is located about 28 km (17 mi) south of Karlovy Vary. It lies in the Teplá Highlands. The highest point is the hill Služetínský vrch at 774 m (2,539 ft) above sea level. The Teplá River flows through the town. The area is rich in fishponds. The western part of the municipal territory is situated in the Slavkovský les Protected Landscape Area.

== History ==
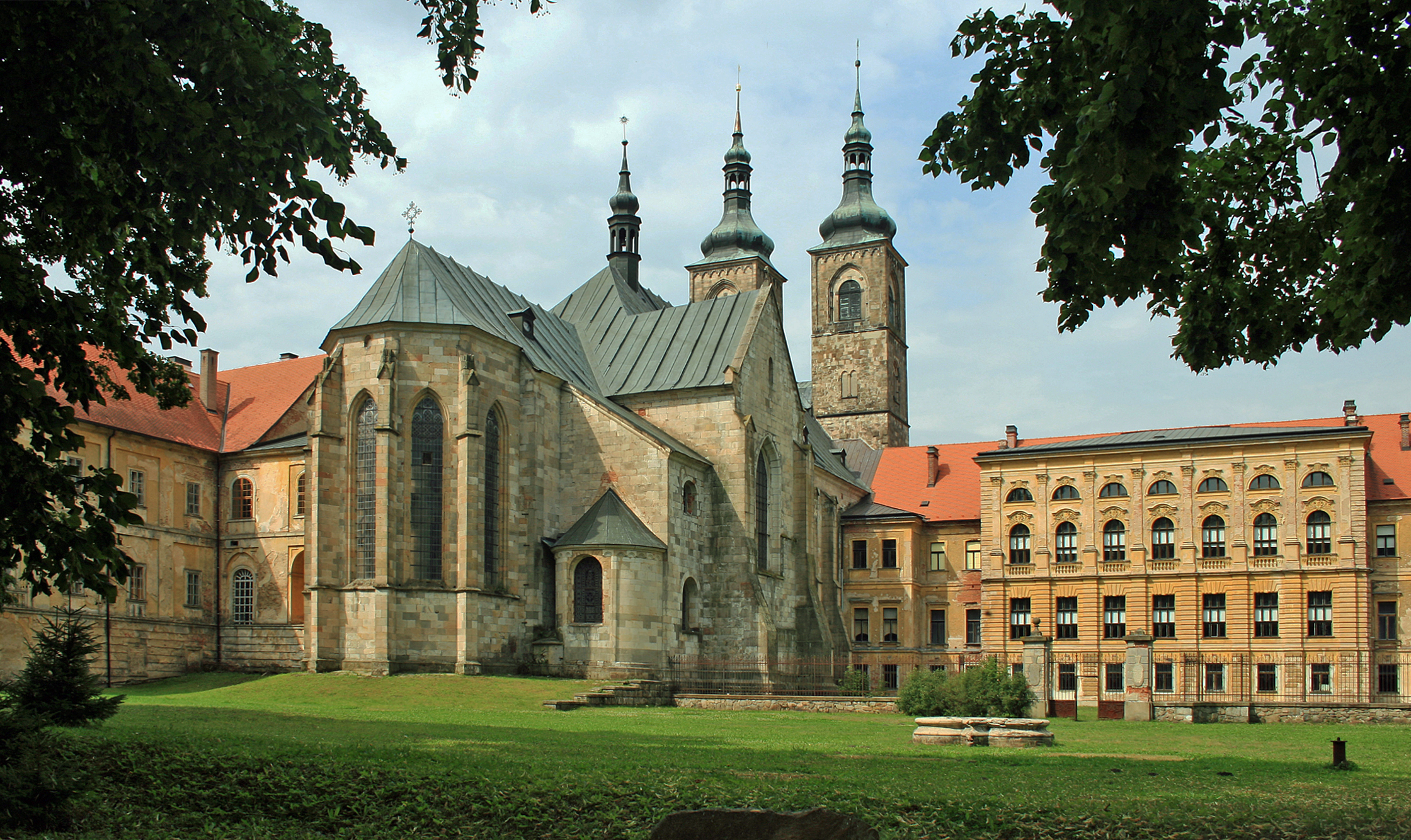
Teplá Abbey

The Teplá Abbey was founded in 1193 by the nobleman Hroznata of Ovenec. The first written mention of the town next to the abbey is from 1197. In the 13th century, the town had strategic importance of the land gate with customs and a market and played an important role in land defense. In these times most of the villages in the neighbourhood, later incorporated to the municipality, were founded.

== Demographics ==
Historical population

Year	Pop.	±%
1869	6,996	—
1880	7,458	+6.6%
1890	7,400	−0.8%
1900	7,426	+0.4%
1910	7,379	−0.6%

Year	Pop.	±%
1921	7,017	−4.9%
1930	6,807	−3.0%
1950	2,843	−58.2%
1961	3,444	+21.1%
1970	3,318	−3.7%

Year	Pop.	±%
1980	3,115	−6.1%
1991	2,924	−6.1%
2001	3,101	+6.1%
2011	2,981	−3.9%
2021	2,859	−4.1%

Source: Censuses

== Transport ==
Teplá is located on the railway line Karlovy Vary–Mariánské Lázně.

== Sights ==
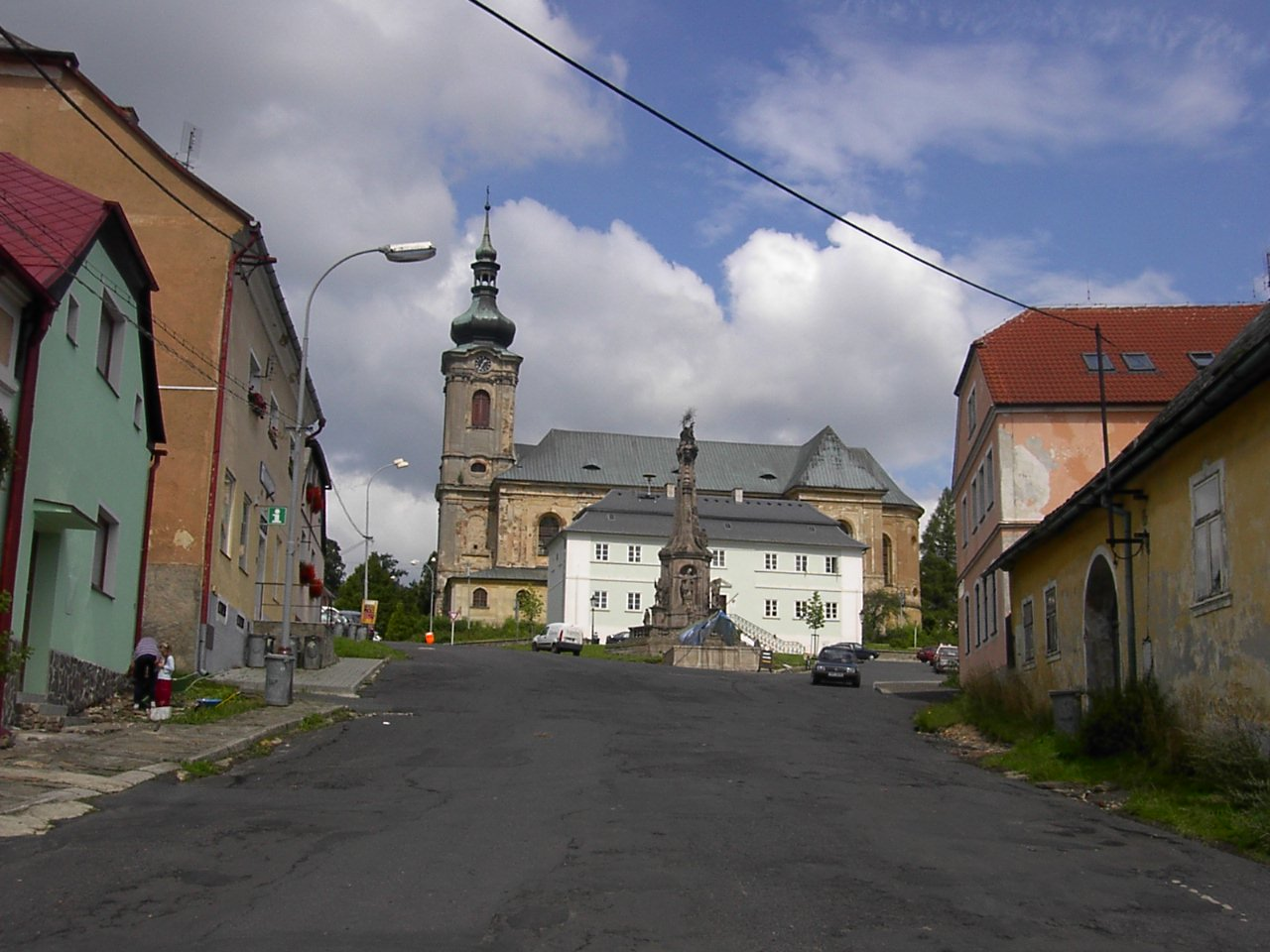
Town square with the Church of Saint Giles

The most significant monument is the complex of the Teplá Abbey. Its oldest preserved part is the Romanesque-Gothic Church of the Annunciation of the Lord. The abbey was rebuilt to its present Baroque form by the architect Christoph Dientzenhofer at the turn of the 17th and 18th centuries. The complex is opened to the public and serves also as a library, museum and art gallery. The Teplá Abbey is among the most significant monasteries in the Czech Republic and is protected as a national cultural monument.

The Gothic Church of Saint Giles in the town's centre was built on the site of the former church in 1762–1765. Its most valuable part are frescoes from scenes from the life of Saint Giles by Elias Dollhopf from 1765.

The Renaissance town hall belong to the oldest buildings in the town. It was built in 1572–1574 and formerly served as a Latin school. Valuable is also the Old Town Hall, built in the Baroque style in 1698.

There are three significant mineral springs in Teplá, the best known of which is Oriona. Until 1945, a bottling plant stood at the source of Oriona. Now it is just a well covered with a gazebo.

== Notable people ==
- Gerhard Auer (1943–2019), German rower, Olympic champion

== Twin towns – sister cities ==
Teplá is twinned with:

- Konnersreuth, Germany
