= Kněževes (Rakovník District) =

- Market town
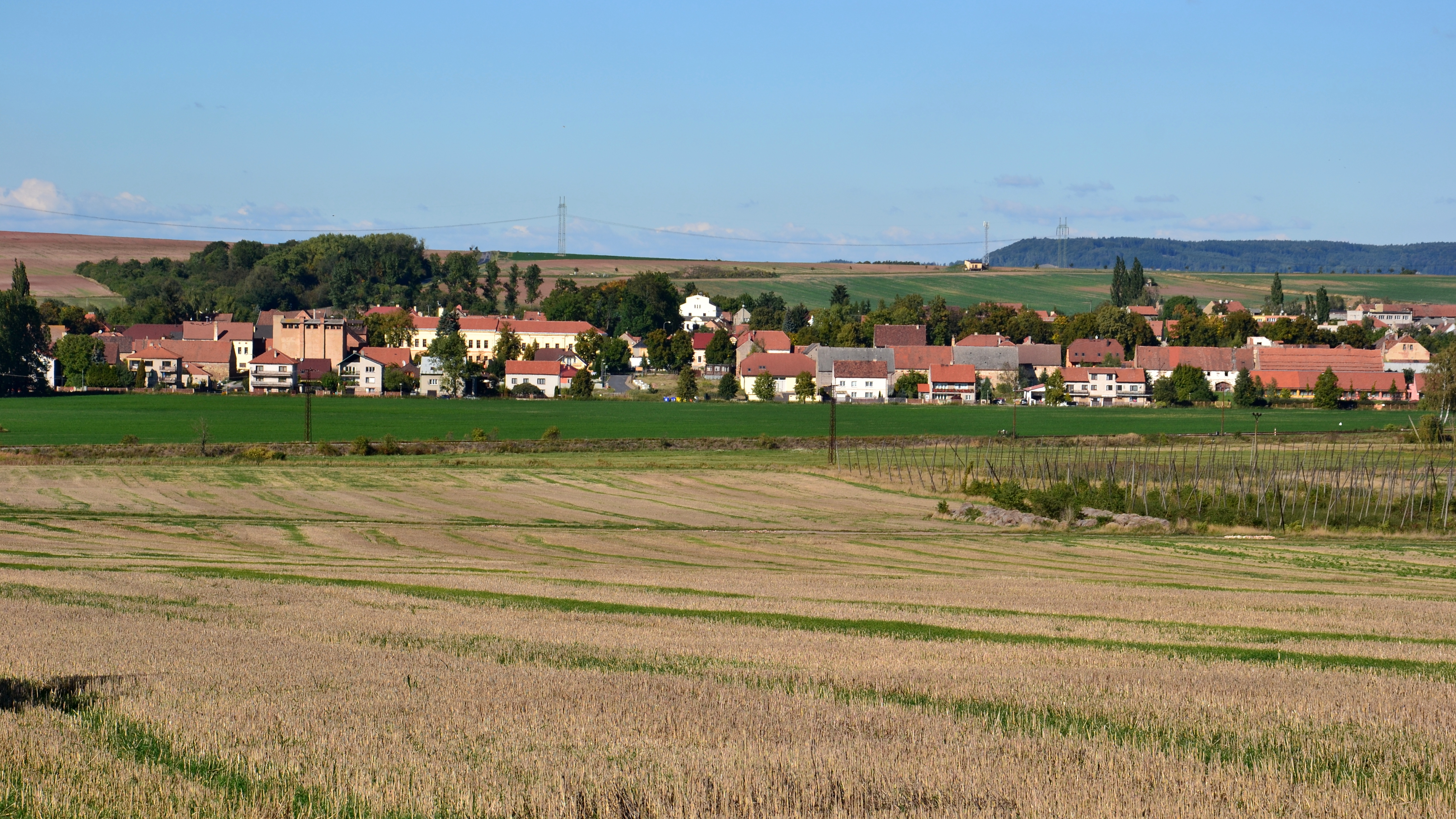
- View from the south

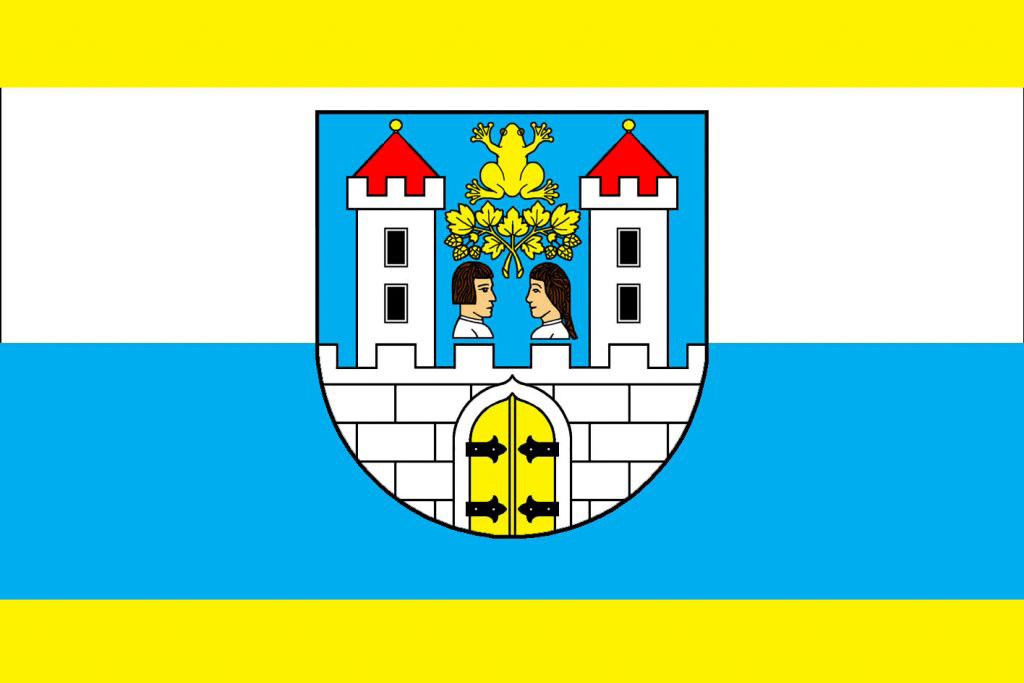
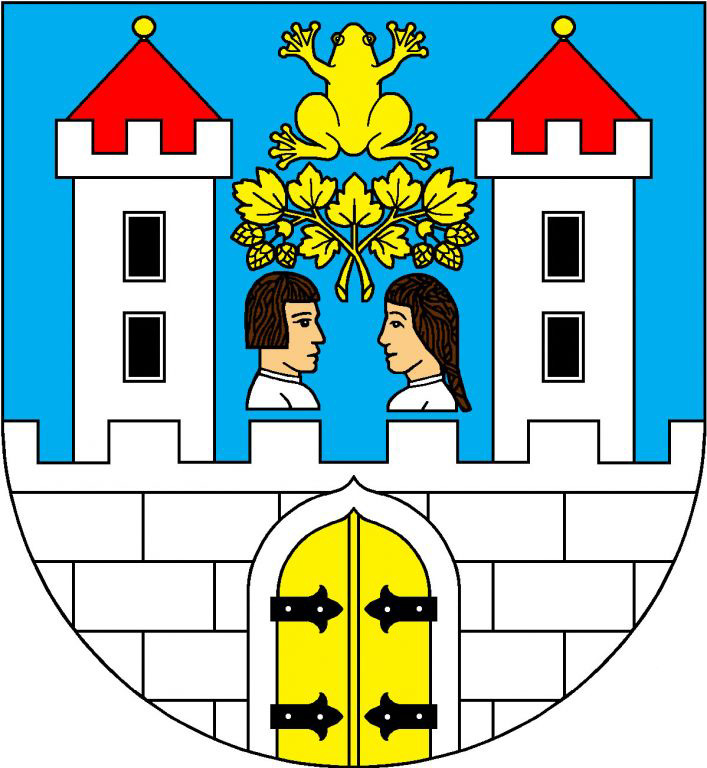
- Flag Coat of arms

- Location in the Czech Republic
- Coordinates: 50°8′48″N 13°38′14″E
- Country: Czech Republic
- Region: Central Bohemian
- District: Rakovník
- First mentioned: 1327

Area
  - Total: 12.57 km^{2} (4.85 sq mi)
- Elevation: 364 m (1,194 ft)

Population (2026-01-01)
  - Total: 1,025
  - Density: 81.54/km^{2} (211.2/sq mi)
- Time zone: UTC+1 (CET)
  - Summer (DST): UTC+2 (CEST)
- Postal code: 270 01
- Website: www.mestys-knezeves.cz

Kněževes (Czech pronunciation: [ˈkɲɛʒɛvɛs]) is a market town in Rakovník District in the Central Bohemian Region of the Czech Republic. It has about 1,000 inhabitants.

== Etymology ==
The name is derived from the Czech words kníže ('count') and ves ('village'), meaning "count's village (village founded on count's land)".

== Geography ==
Kněževes is located about 8 kilometres (5 mi) northwest of Rakovník and 50 km (31 mi) west of Prague. It lies in an agricultural landscape in the Rakovník Uplands. The highest point is at 429 m (1,407 ft) above sea level.

== History ==
The first written mention of Kněževes is from 1327, in a deed of King John of Bohemia for the Teplá Abbey. The village was located on a trade route from Prague to Cheb. In 1685, the Waldstein family purchased Kněževes from the royal chamber. After Jan Josef Waldstein died in 1733, the village was inherited by his daughter Marie Anna, who married Josef Wilhelm, Count of Fürstenberg. The Fürstenberg family then owned Kněževes until the establishment of an independent municipality in 1850.

Kněževes was predominantly an agricultural village. In the second half of the 19th century, it became known as the second most important hop growing locality in the country (after Žatec). In 1897, Kněževes was promoted to a market town by Emperor Franz Joseph I.

== Demographics ==
Historical population

| Year | Pop. | ±% |
|---|---|---|
| 1869 | 1,168 | — |
| 1880 | 1,540 | +31.8% |
| 1890 | 1,528 | −0.8% |
| 1900 | 1,688 | +10.5% |
| 1910 | 1,611 | −4.6% |

| Year | Pop. | ±% |
|---|---|---|
| 1921 | 1,784 | +10.7% |
| 1930 | 1,691 | −5.2% |
| 1950 | 1,136 | −32.8% |
| 1961 | 1,151 | +1.3% |
| 1970 | 1,067 | −7.3% |

| Year | Pop. | ±% |
|---|---|---|
| 1980 | 1,026 | −3.8% |
| 1991 | 945 | −7.9% |
| 2001 | 932 | −1.4% |
| 2011 | 955 | +2.5% |
| 2021 | 962 | +0.7% |

Source: Censuses

== Economy ==
Kněževes lies in the Žatec Hop Region. The hop growing continues here to this day.

== Transport ==
The I/6 road, part of the European route E48, runs through the municipality. It replaces an unfinished section of the D6 motorway from Prague to Karlovy Vary.

== Sights ==
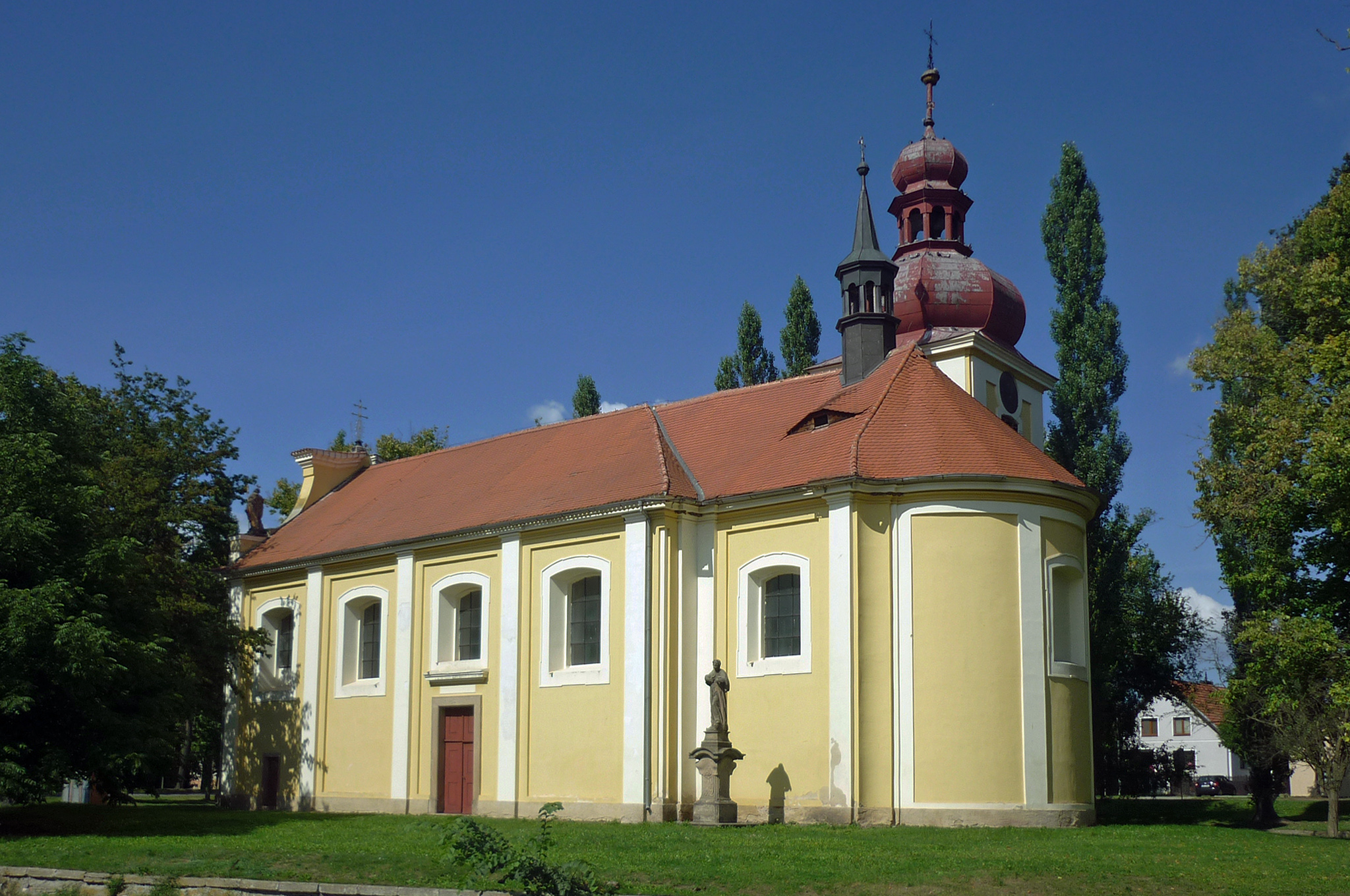
Church of Saint James the Great

The main landmark of Kněževes is the Church of Saint James the Great. The original church was first mentioned in 1318. After it was destroyed by fire in 1718, it was replaced by the current Baroque building in 1721, designed by the architect František Maxmilián Kaňka.
