= Dáma a Král =

- Genre: Crime drama
- Directed by: Vladimír Michálek
- Starring: Matěj Hádek; Tereza Hofová
- Country of origin: Czech Republic
- Original language: Czech
- No. of seasons: 5
- No. of episodes: 48

Production
- Running time: 52-62 minutes

Original release
- Network: TV Nova
- Release: 2017

Dáma a Král (Lady and the King) is a Czech crime series broadcast on TV Nova since October 22, 2017. The main roles are played by Matěj Hádek, Tereza Hofová, Miroslav Donutil, Jan Cina and Michal Dalecký.

== Plot ==
Law firm Černý, Braunová & spol. recruits a private investigator to his team, whose task is to uncover the real culprits of the crimes of which the office's clients are accused. The main characters are the slightly eccentric investigator and accomplice to the robbery of the century, Prokop Král (Matěj Hádek), who is released after 15 years in hiding, and the capable and successful lawyer Lenka Braunová (Tereza Hofová). Together they form an opposite and sparkling couple, which, however, works very well. Under the baton of office chief Rudolf Černý (Miroslav Donutil) and with the help of novice lawyer Jiří Mladý (Jan Cina), they investigate various cases and help people who cannot or do not want to go to the police. No crime, no mystery is unsolvable for them. They are not police officers, so they have to solve clients' cases without a criminal background - with wit, a surprising action, a new, unexpected view of the crime or its perpetrator.

== Cast ==
- Matěj Hádek as Prokop Král – private investigator and accomplice to the robbery of the century
- Tereza Hofová as JUDr. Lenka Braunová – barrister
- Miroslav Donutil as JUDr. Rudolf Černý – barrister
- Jan Cina as Mgr. Jiří Mladý – trainee barrister, later barrister
- Anna Linhartová as Klára Horová – daughter of Prokop Král and Klára Horová
- Miloš Vávra as Zdeněk Hora – grandfather of Klára Horová
- Ivana Chýlková as Veronika Müllerová – owner of the stolen diamonds
- Markéta Hrubešová as Kateřina Horová – accomplice to the robbery of the century
- David Punčochář as mjr. Mgr. Jan Hofman – High Commissioner
- Eva Holubová as Simona Braunová – mother of Lenka Braunová (since season 2)
- Michal Dalecký as Mgr. Milan Šedivý/Filip Kaiser – new colleague of Lenka Braunová, friend of Prokop Král (since season 2)
- Roman Zach as JUDr. Ondřej Petrovský – competing lawyer (since season 2)
- Kristýna Frejová as mjr. Mgr. Helena Kalinská – High Commissioner (since season 2)
