= Heřmanov (Žďár nad Sázavou District) =

- Municipality
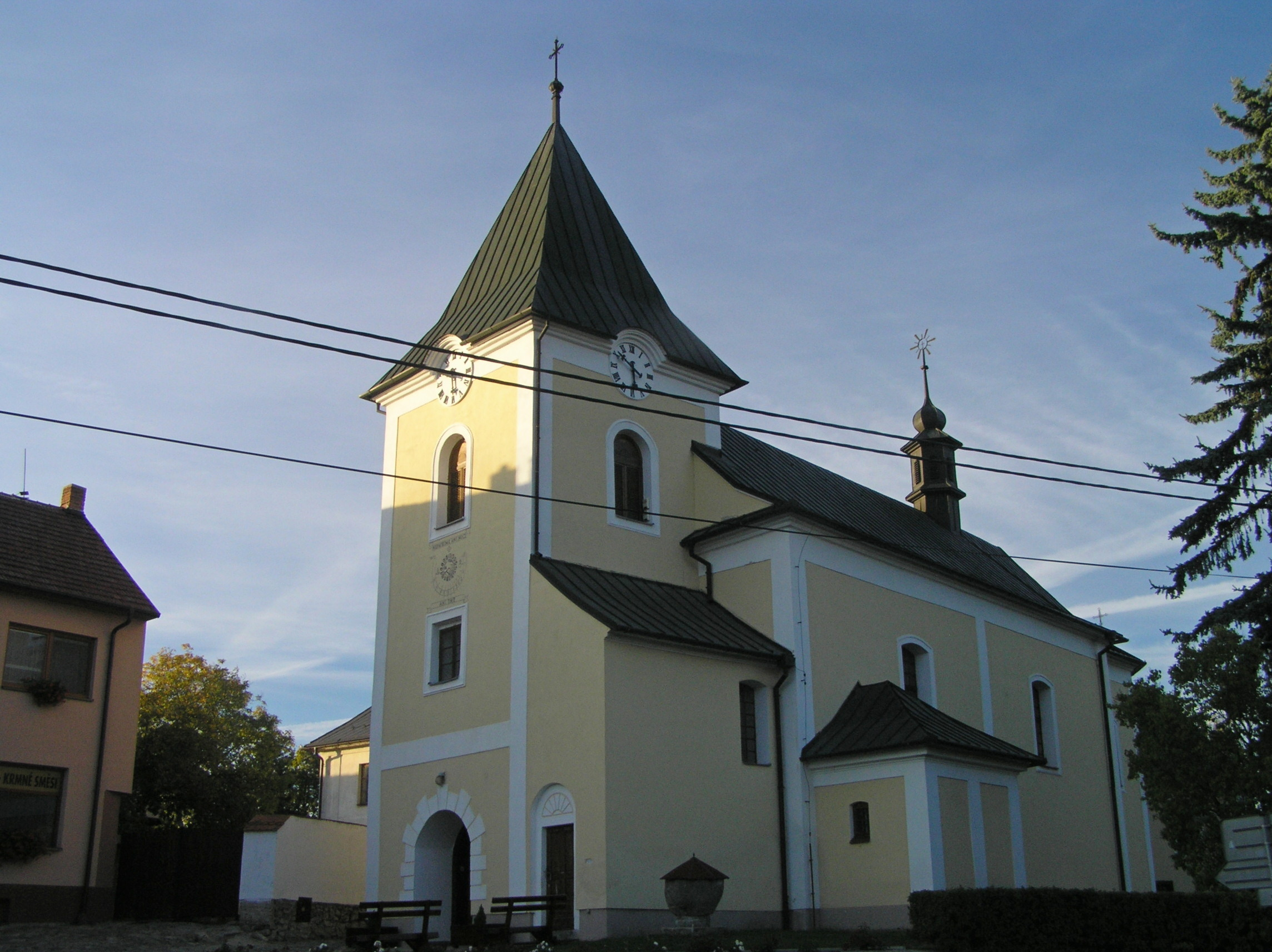
- Church of Saint Nicholas

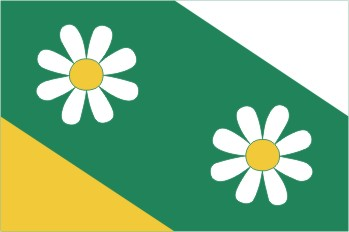
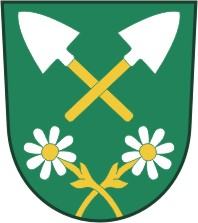
- Flag Coat of arms

- Location in the Czech Republic
- Coordinates: 49°22′46″N 16°10′53″E
- Country: Czech Republic
- Region: Vysočina
- District: Žďár nad Sázavou
- First mentioned: 1349

Area
  - Total: 5.39 km^{2} (2.08 sq mi)
- Elevation: 590 m (1,940 ft)

Population (2026-01-01)
  - Total: 233
  - Density: 43.2/km^{2} (112/sq mi)
- Time zone: UTC+1 (CET)
  - Summer (DST): UTC+2 (CEST)
- Postal code: 594 58
- Website: www.hermanov.info

Heřmanov is a municipality and village in Žďár nad Sázavou District in the Vysočina Region of the Czech Republic. It has about 200 inhabitants.

== Etymology ==
The initial German name of the village was Hermannschlag (meaning "Hermann's glade". It was probably named after its lokator. In Czech, the village was called Hermašlak (transcription of the German name). From the late 19th century, it has been called Heřmanov.

== Geography ==
Heřmanov is located about 27 kilometres (17 mi) southeast of Žďár nad Sázavou and 34 km (21 mi) northwest of Brno. It lies in the Křižanov Highlands. The highest point is at 661 m (2,169 ft) above sea level. The Cejpek Stream originates here and supplies a system of six small fishponds.

== History ==
The first written mention of Heřmanov is from 1349, when the village belonged to the Osová estate. It was probably founded during the colonisation in the 13th century. From 1437, Heřmanov was part of the Náměšť estate.

== Demographics ==
Historical population

| Year | Pop. | ±% |
|---|---|---|
| 1869 | 338 | — |
| 1880 | 362 | +7.1% |
| 1890 | 342 | −5.5% |
| 1900 | 357 | +4.4% |
| 1910 | 332 | −7.0% |

| Year | Pop. | ±% |
|---|---|---|
| 1921 | 308 | −7.2% |
| 1930 | 273 | −11.4% |
| 1950 | 263 | −3.7% |
| 1961 | 258 | −1.9% |
| 1970 | 278 | +7.8% |

| Year | Pop. | ±% |
|---|---|---|
| 1980 | 241 | −13.3% |
| 1991 | 224 | −7.1% |
| 2001 | 210 | −6.2% |
| 2011 | 210 | +0.0% |
| 2021 | 209 | −0.5% |

Source: Censuses

== Transport ==
There are no railways or major roads passing through the municipality.

== Sights ==
The main landmark of Heřmanov is the Church of Saint Nicholas. It has a Gothic core from the 14th century. It was modified in the Renaissance style and then rebuilt in the Baroque style in 1732. The three bells in the bell tower date from 1493, 1504 and 1543. Next to the church is a Neoclassical rectory from 1799.
