= Kněževes (Prague-West District) =

- Municipality
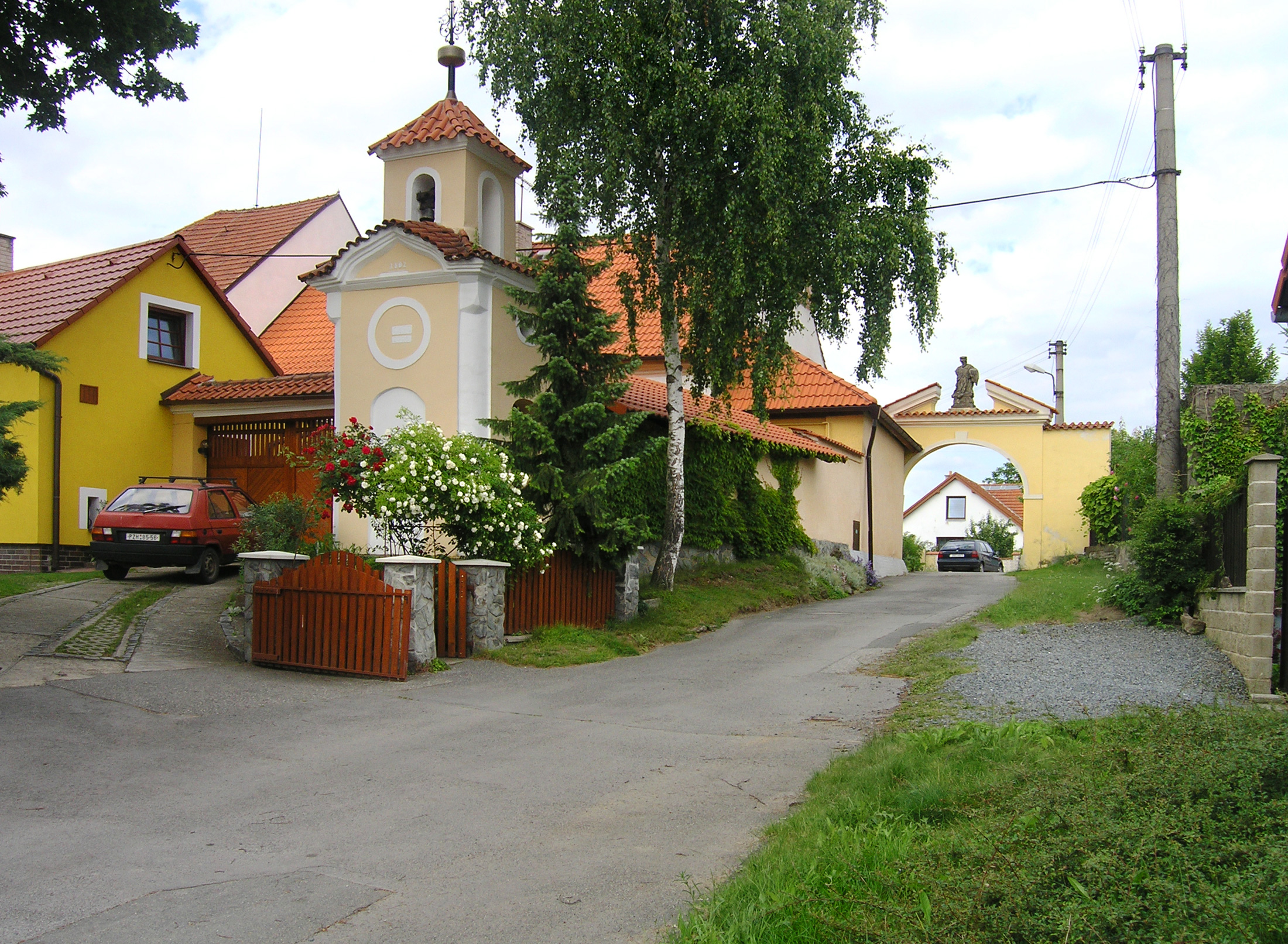
- Belfry and a farm

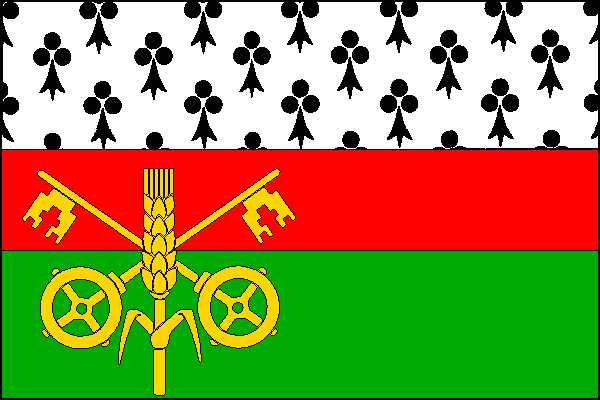
- Flag Coat of arms

- Location in the Czech Republic
- Coordinates: 50°7′13″N 14°15′38″E
- Country: Czech Republic
- Region: Central Bohemian
- District: Prague-West
- First mentioned: 1088

Area
  - Total: 2.55 km^{2} (0.98 sq mi)
- Elevation: 334 m (1,096 ft)

Population (2026-01-01)
  - Total: 653
  - Density: 256/km^{2} (663/sq mi)
- Time zone: UTC+1 (CET)
  - Summer (DST): UTC+2 (CEST)
- Postal code: 252 68
- Website: www.knezeves.cz

Kněževes is a municipality and village in Prague-West District in the Central Bohemian Region of the Czech Republic. It has about 700 inhabitants.

== Demographics ==
Historical population
Year	Pop.	±%
1869	430	—
1880	423	−1.6%
1890	446	+5.4%
1900	450	+0.9%
1910	526	+16.9%
1921	508	−3.4%
1930	613	+20.7%
1950	582	−5.1%
1961	577	−0.9%
1970	561	−2.8%
1980	604	+7.7%
1991	550	−8.9%
2001	524	−4.7%
2011	595	+13.5%
2021	651	+9.4%
Source: Censuses
