= Teplá (river) =

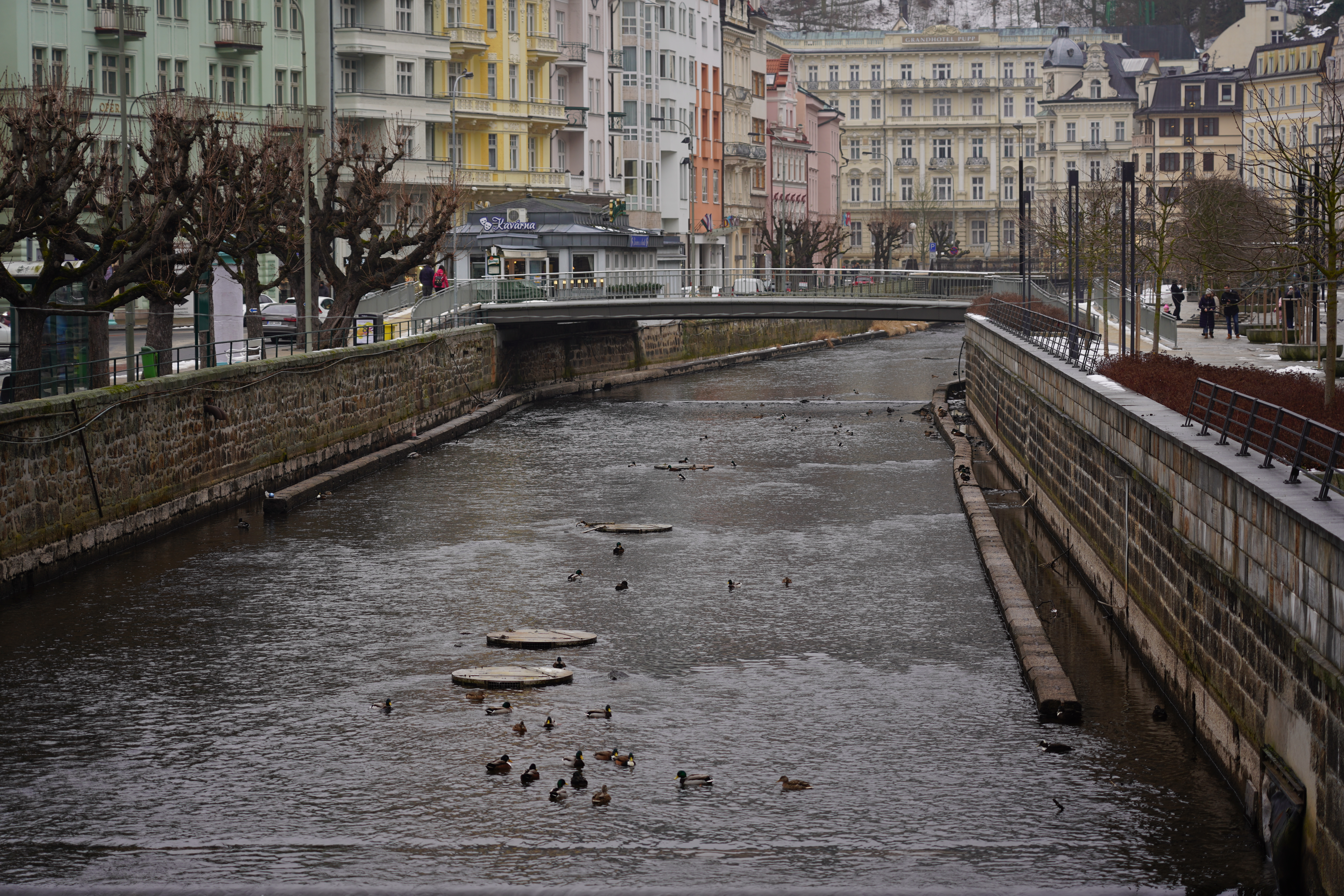
- The Teplá in Karlovy Vary

Location
- Country: Czech Republic
- Region: Karlovy Vary

Physical characteristics
- Source
  - location: Mariánské Lázně, Teplá Highlands
  - coordinates: 49°59′50″N 12°43′33″E
  - elevation: 790 m (2,590 ft)
- Mouth
  - location: Ohře
  - coordinates: 50°14′3″N 12°52′12″E
  - elevation: 372 m (1,220 ft)
- Length: 65.1 km (40.5 mi)
- Basin size: 384.9 km^{2} (148.6 sq mi)
- Discharge
  - average: 2.73 m^{3}/s (96 cu ft/s) near estuary

Basin features
- Progression: Ohře→ Elbe→ North Sea

The Teplá (Czech pronunciation: [ˈtɛplaː]; German: Tepl) is a river in the Czech Republic, a right tributary of the Ohře River. It flows through the Karlovy Vary Region. It is 65.1 km (40.5 mi) long. The basin of the river is known for thermal springs.

== Etymology ==
The name literally means 'warm' and refers to its warm water. In the basin of the river (in the city of Karlovy Vary) there are well-known thermal springs.

== Characteristic ==
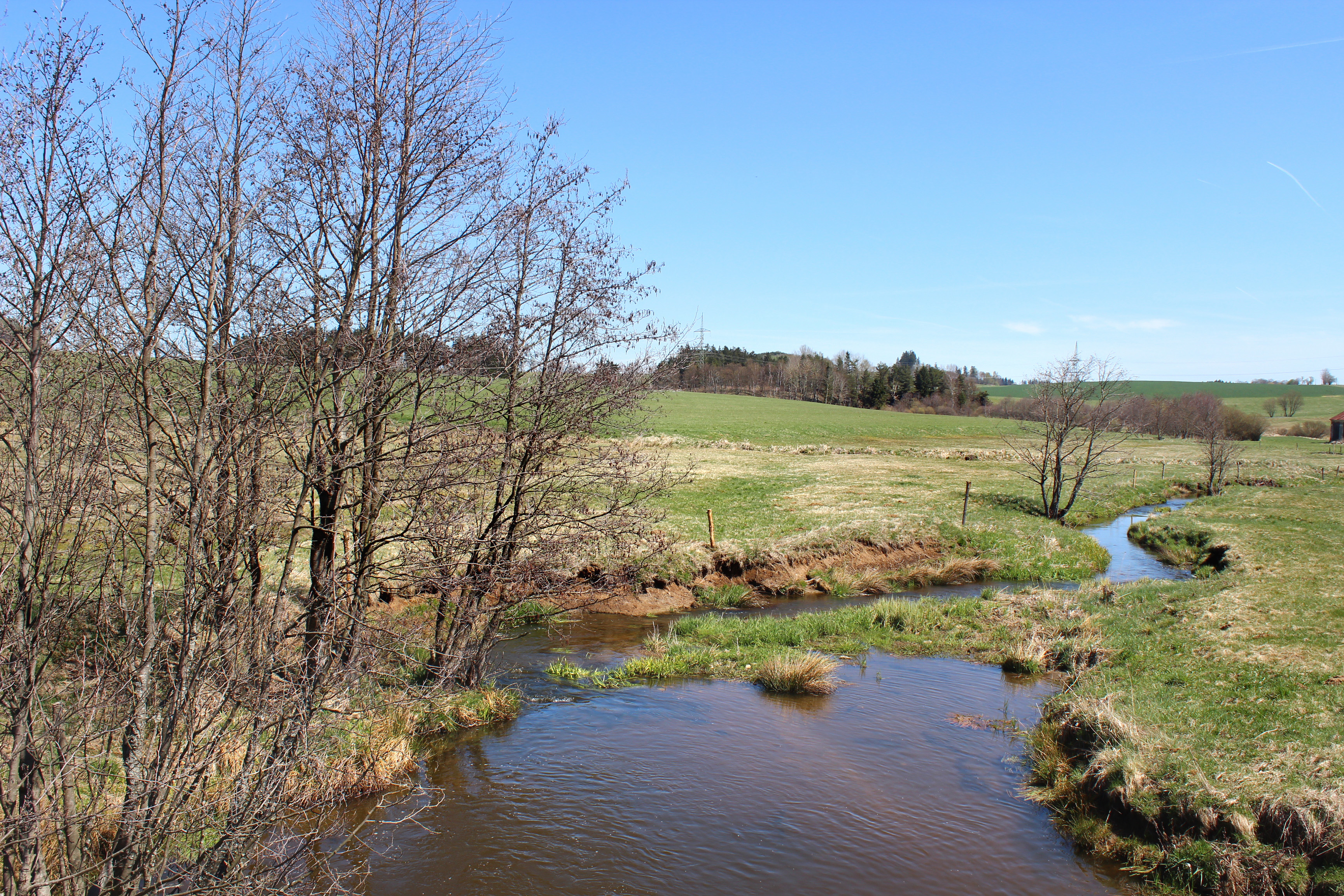
The Teplá in Teplá-Křepkovice

The Teplá originates in the territory of Mariánské Lázně in the Teplá Highlands at an elevation of 790 m (2,590 ft) and flows to Karlovy Vary, where it enters the Ohře River at an elevation of 372 m (1,220 ft). It is 65.1 km (40.5 mi) long. Its drainage basin has an area of 384.9 km^{2} (148.6 sq mi).

The longest tributaries of the Teplá are:

Tributary	Length (km)	River km	Side
Lomnický potok	27.7	7.5	right
Pramenský potok	16.5	35.2	left
Otročínský potok	12.6	30.6	right
Dolský potok	8.0	23.3	left

== Course ==
The river flows through the municipal territories of Mariánské Lázně, Zádub-Závišín, Ovesné Kladruby, Teplá, Nová Ves, Bečov nad Teplou, Teplička, Březová and Karlovy Vary.

== Bodies of water ==
There are 638 bodies of water in the basin area; the largest of them is the Stanovice Reservoir with an area of 110 ha (270 acres). The second largest body of water is Podhora Reservoir with an area of 76 ha (190 acres), built directly on the Teplá. In the lower course of the river is also Březová Reservoir. On the upper course there is a system of several fishponds.

== Nature ==
The almost entire flow of the river is located in the protected landscape area of Slavkov Forest. The area of bogs where the Teplá originates is protected as Prameniště Teplé Nature Reserve with an area of 42.9 ha (106 acres). The valley of the river south of Bečov nad Teplou is protected as Údolí Teplé Nature Reserve with an area of 160.2 ha (396 acres).

Species of animals that live in the river include the brook lamprey, ide, European bullhead and European crayfish.

== Tourism ==
The sections of the river from Teplá to Bečov nad Teplou and from Bečov nad Teplou to Březová Reservoir are suitable for river tourism, but only in spring or after heavy rains.

== Sport ==
Once a year in September, the Březová Reservoir is drained and paddling races take place under the reservoir.

== See also ==
- List of rivers of the Czech Republic
