= Kolešovice =

- Municipality
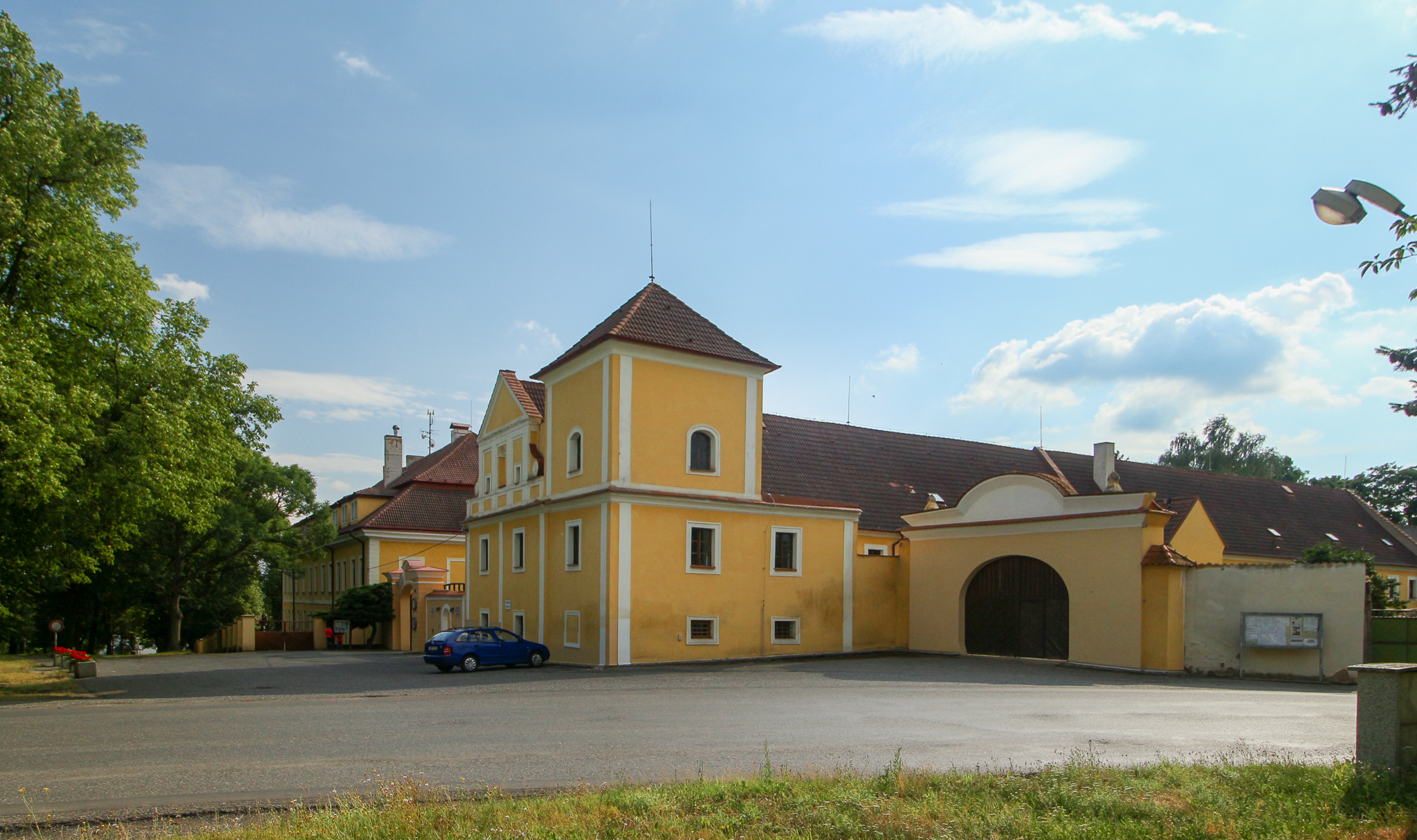
- Old Castle and New Castle

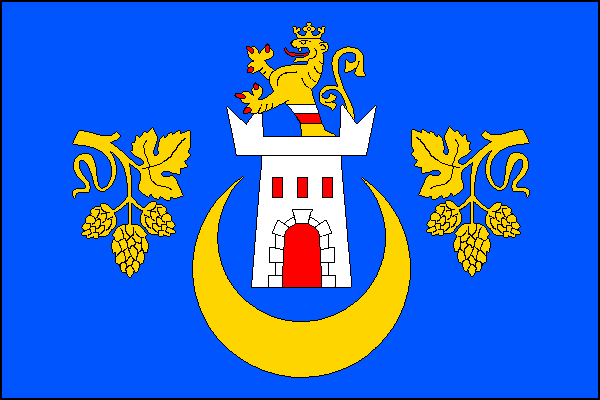
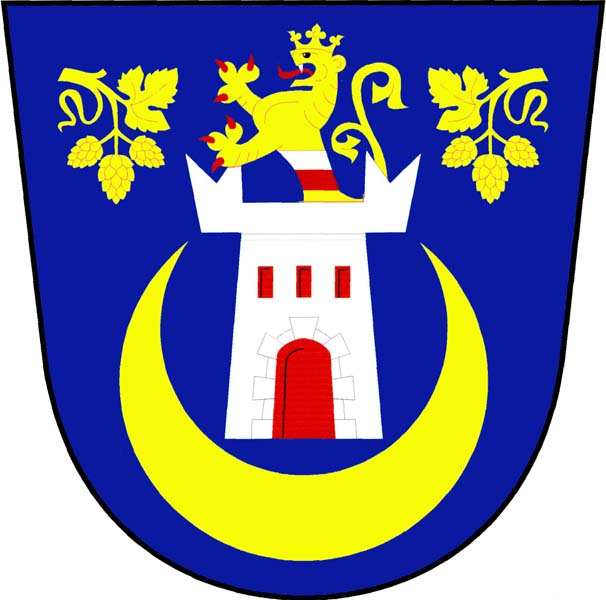
- Flag Coat of arms

- Location in the Czech Republic
- Coordinates: 50°8′23″N 13°36′37″E
- Country: Czech Republic
- Region: Central Bohemian
- District: Rakovník
- First mentioned: 1318

Area
  - Total: 15.36 km^{2} (5.93 sq mi)
- Elevation: 376 m (1,234 ft)

Population (2026-01-01)
  - Total: 840
  - Density: 55/km^{2} (140/sq mi)
- Time zone: UTC+1 (CET)
  - Summer (DST): UTC+2 (CEST)
- Postal code: 270 02
- Website: www.kolesovice.cz

Kolešovice is a municipality and village in Rakovník District in the Central Bohemian Region of the Czech Republic. It has about 800 inhabitants.

== Administrative division ==
Kolešovice consists of three municipal parts (in brackets population according to the 2021 census):

- Kolešovice (761)
- Heřmanov (28)
- Zderaz (50)

== Etymology ==
The name is derived from the personal name Koleš, meaning "the village of Koleš's people".

== Geography ==
Kolešovice is located about 9 km (6 mi) northwest of Rakovník and 52 km (32 mi) west of Prague. It lies in an agricultural landscape in the Rakovník Uplands. The highest point is at 435 m (1,427 ft) above sea level. The stream Kolešovický potok flows through the municipality.

== History ==
The first written mention of Kolešovice is from 1318. The most notable owners of the village were the Kolowrat family, who held it from 1375 to 1541, and the Wallis family, who bought the estate in 1720 and owned it until 1945.

== Demographics ==
Historical population

Year	Pop.	±%
1869	1,591	—
1880	1,906	+19.8%
1890	2,020	+6.0%
1900	1,977	−2.1%
1910	1,761	−10.9%

Year	Pop.	±%
1921	1,743	−1.0%
1930	1,749	+0.3%
1950	973	−44.4%
1961	1,205	+23.8%
1970	1,064	−11.7%

Year	Pop.	±%
1980	927	−12.9%
1991	830	−10.5%
2001	852	+2.7%
2011	804	−5.6%
2021	839	+4.4%

Source: Censuses

== Transport ==
There are no railways or major roads passing through the municipality.

== Sights ==
The local fortress from the 14th century was rebuilt into a Renaissance residence in the mid-16th century, but it burned down in 1707. In 1724, a new aristocratic residence, today called Starý zámek ('old castle'), was built. The castle Nový zámek ('new castle') was built next to it after 1744. Today it has a pseudo-Renaissance form. Today the Kolešovice Castle houses a retirement home.

The Church of Saints Peter and Paul is the second landmark of Kolešovice. It was first mentioned in 1352. The current Baroque church was built in 1706–1708.
