= Kněževes (Žďár nad Sázavou District) =

- Municipality
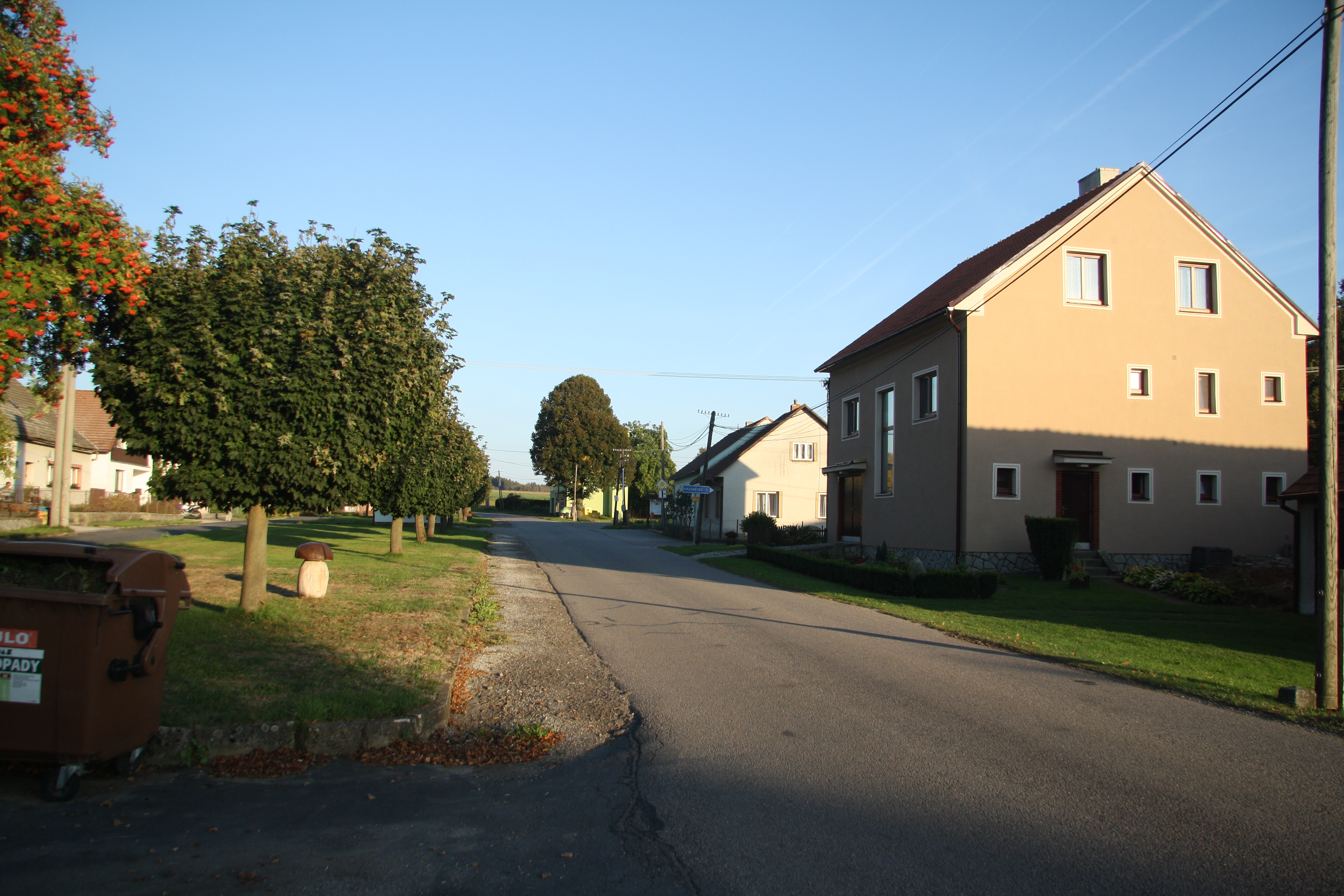
- Main street

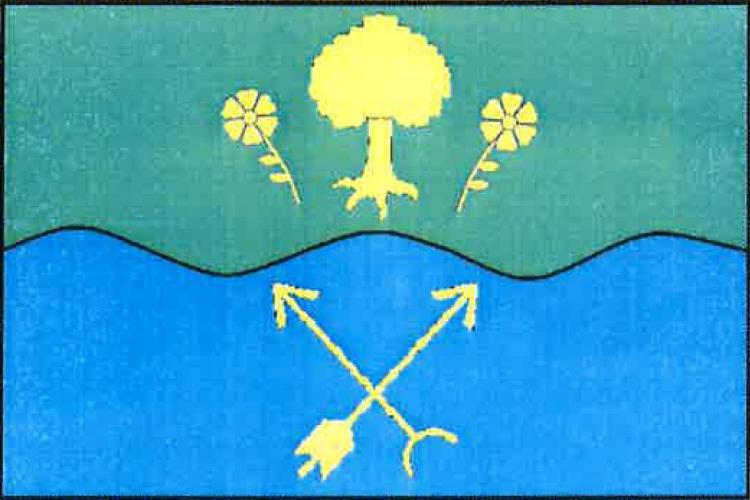
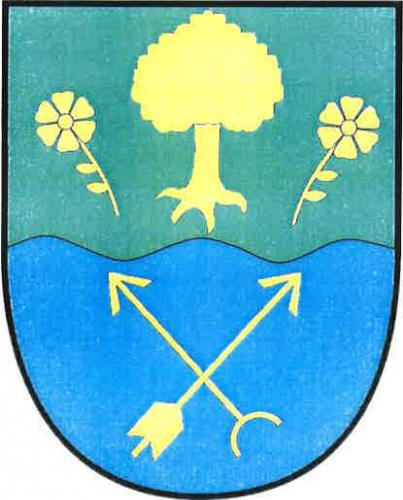
- Flag Coat of arms

- Location in the Czech Republic
- Coordinates: 49°27′23″N 15°58′51″E
- Country: Czech Republic
- Region: Vysočina
- District: Žďár nad Sázavou
- First mentioned: 1370

Area
  - Total: 7.71 km^{2} (2.98 sq mi)
- Elevation: 549 m (1,801 ft)

Population (2026-01-01)
  - Total: 171
  - Density: 22.2/km^{2} (57.4/sq mi)
- Time zone: UTC+1 (CET)
  - Summer (DST): UTC+2 (CEST)
- Postal code: 594 44
- Website: www.obecknezeves.cz

Kněževes is a municipality and village in Žďár nad Sázavou District in the Vysočina Region of the Czech Republic. It has about 200 inhabitants.

Kněževes lies approximately 13 kilometres (8 mi) south of Žďár nad Sázavou, 31 km (19 mi) east of Jihlava, and 133 km (83 mi) south-east of Prague.

== Demographics ==
Historical population
Year	Pop.	±%
1869	270	—
1880	282	+4.4%
1890	269	−4.6%
1900	238	−11.5%
1910	261	+9.7%
1921	270	+3.4%
1930	257	−4.8%
1950	250	−2.7%
1961	234	−6.4%
1970	222	−5.1%
1980	190	−14.4%
1991	171	−10.0%
2001	169	−1.2%
2011	147	−13.0%
2021	153	+4.1%
Source: Censuses
