= Teplá Abbey =

Premonstratensian abbey of the Czech Republic

Coordinates: 49°57′59″N 12°52′42″E

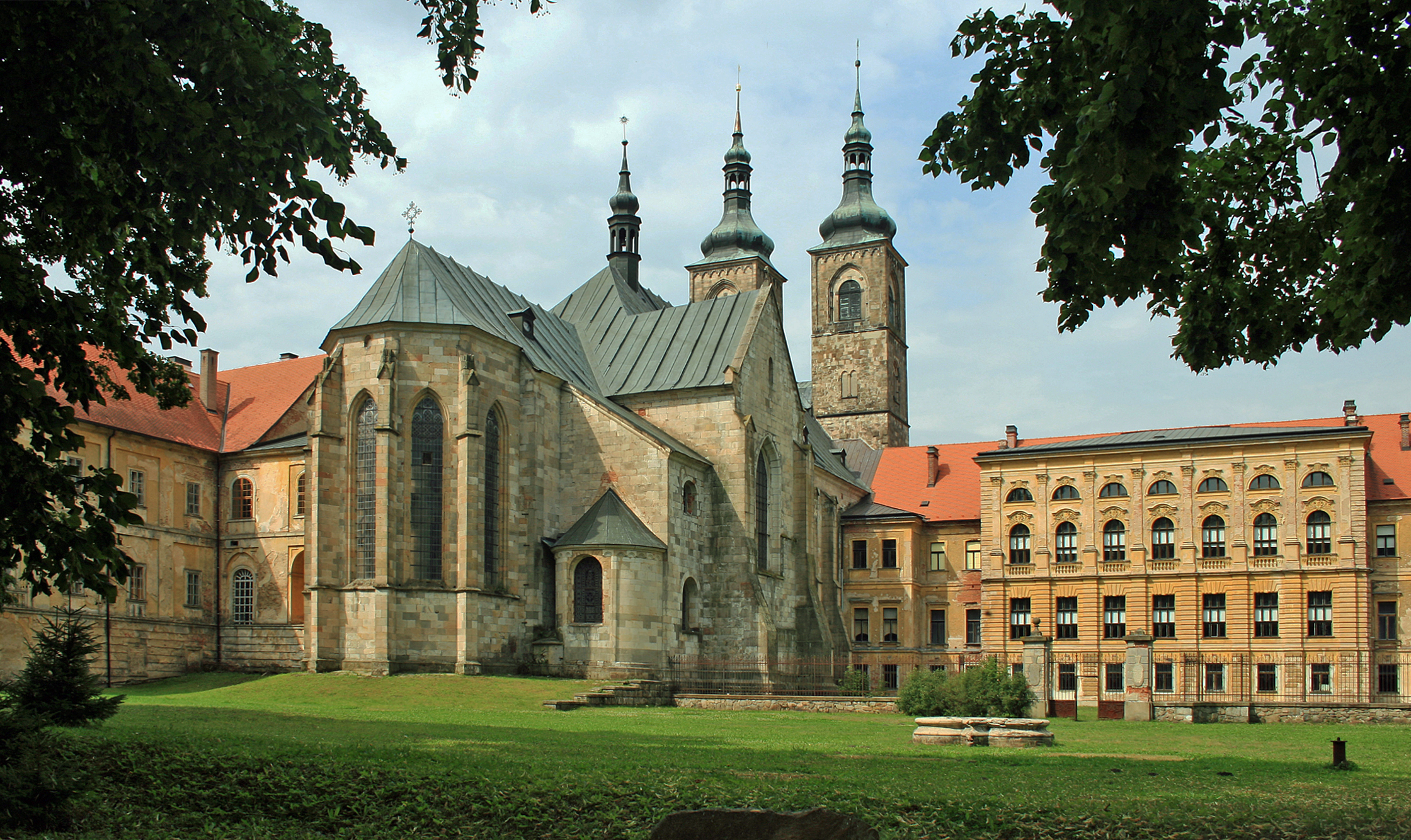
The Teplá Abbey church

Aerial view of the abbey

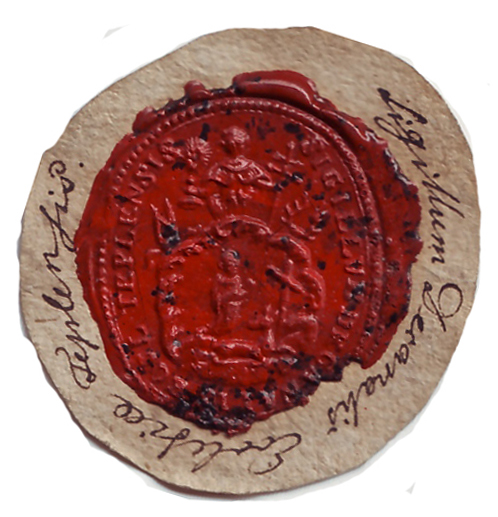
Dean's authoritative seal of the premostrat Cloister Teplá ~1690

Teplá Abbey (Czech: Klášter Teplá; German: Stift Tepl) is a Premonstratensian abbey in Teplá in the Karlovy Vary Region of the Czech Republic. It is included in the Diocese of Plzeň.

== History ==
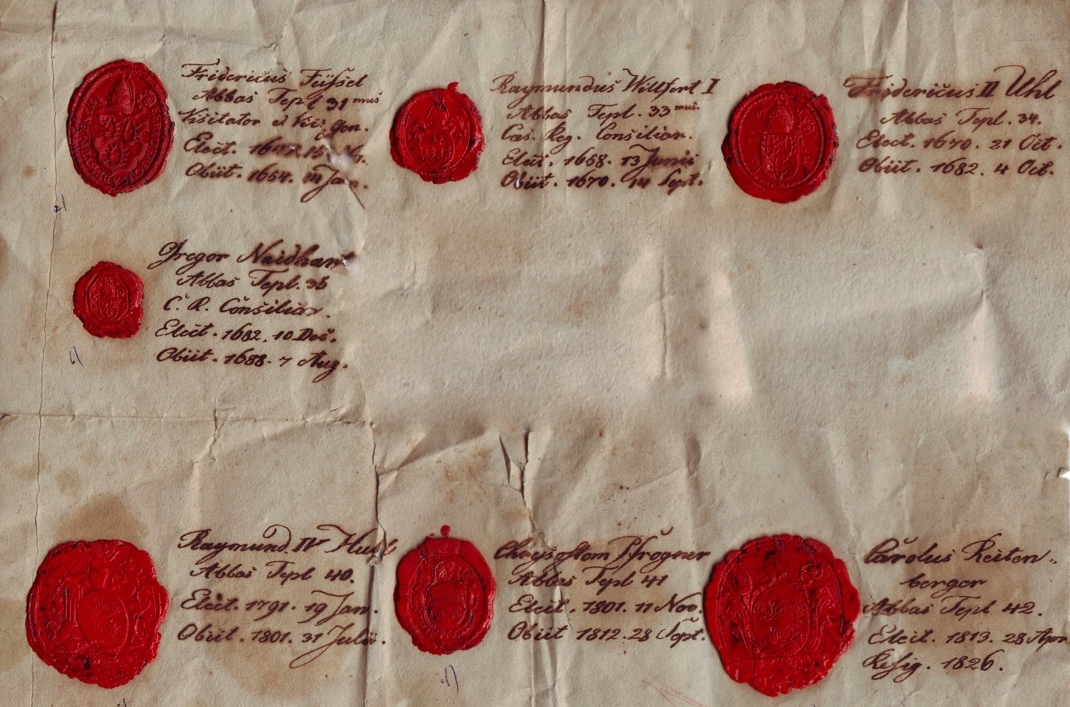
Some monastery abbots seals from thair historical succession: 31. Fredericus Füssel, 33. Raymundus Willfort I., 34. Fridericus II. Uhl, 35. Gregor Neidhrat, 40. Raymund IV. Hubl, 41. Chrysostom Pfrogner, 42. Carolus Reitenberger, respectively

Teplá Abbey was founded in 1193 by the blessed Hroznata of Ovenec, a Bohemian nobleman (d. 1217, feast July 14 on the Premonstratensian calendar). The first monks came from the Strahov Monastery in Prague.

The present monastery building was erected by Abbot Raimund Wilfert II (1688-1724); the library was built by Abbot Gilbert Helmer (since 1900). The Romanesque church, with additions in the style of the transition to the Gothic, is one of the oldest churches of Bohemia. The high altar of the church was sculpted by Josef Lauermann and Ignatius Platzer in 1750. After Hroznata was beatified in 1897, his reliquary casket was moved to the apse of the church for display. The original burial place of Hroznata is marked by on the floor before the main altar, where his original sarcophagus also stands.

Plenteous monastery activity is shown in the literature that is defined by its rich collection of prints of different nature in the monastic library
