= Anna Kameníková =

Czech actress

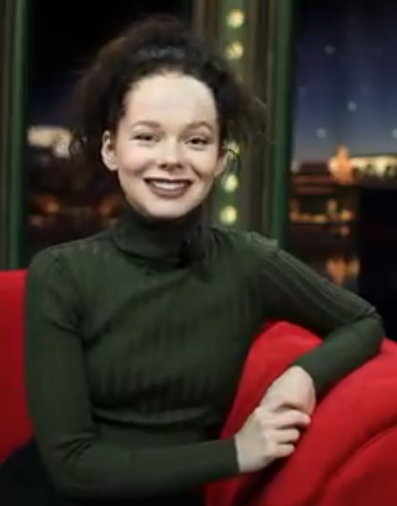
- On Show Jana Krause in 2020
- Born: Anna Linhartová; 21 March 1994 (age 31); Prague, Czech Republic
- Occupation: Actress
- Years active: 2011–present
- Parent: Jitka Asterová

Anna Kameníková (née Linhartová; born 21 March 1994) is a Czech actress. She was nominated in the category of Best Supporting Actress at the 2011 Czech Lion Awards, for her performance in the film Innocence.

She has also had roles in television series including Případy 1. oddělení, Život je ples, and miniseries Božena about the life of the Czech author Božena Němcová. In 2025, she was cast in Broken Voices, a film directed by Ondřej Provazník and inspired by the real-life Bambini di Praga case. It was released on July 6, 2025, at the 59th Karlovy Vary International Film Festival, where it competed for the Crystal Globe.

She is the daughter of the Czech actress Jitka Asterová. She got married at the age of 23 in June 2017. Apart from being an actress, she works as a cheese store shop assistant. She has also written and published a cookbook.
