= List of Czech films of the 2010s =

A List of Czech films of the 2010s.

Title	Director	Cast	Genre	Notes
2010
Bastardi	Petr Šícha	Tomáš Magnusek, Ladislav Potměšil	Thriller	
Bear Islands	Martin Ryšavý		Documentary	
Český Mír	Filip Remunda, Vít Klusák		Documentary comedy	
Doktor od jezera hrochů	Zdeněk Troška	Jaroslav Šmíd, Eva Holubová	Comedy	
Habermann	Juraj Herz	Mark Waschke, Karel Roden	War drama	
Heart Beat 3	Jan Němec	Jan Budař	Drama	The first Czech 3D full-length film.
Kajínek	Petr Jákl	Konstantin Lavronenko	Action thriller	
Kooky	Jan Svěrák	Zdeněk Svěrák, Ondřej Svěrák	Animation, action comedy	
Ležáky 42	Miloš Pilař		Documentary	
Mamas & Papas	Alice Nellis	Zuzana Bydžovská	Psychological drama	
Největší z Čechů	Robert Sedláček	Jaroslav Plesl, Simona Babčáková	Drama	
Občanský průkaz	Libor Kovář	Ondřej Trojan	Comedy	
Oko nad Prahou	Olga Špátová		Documentary	
The Rain Fairy	Milan Cieslar	Jakub Gottwald, Vica Kerekes	Fairy Tale	
Surviving Life	Jan Švankmajer	Václav Helšus, Klára Issová	Comedy	
Tacho	Mirjam Landa	Daniel Landa	Action Comedy	
The Teacher	Jan Hřebejk	Zuzana Mauréry	Drama	Coproduction with Slovakia
Walking Too Fast	Radim Špaček	Thriller	Ondřej Malý	Winner of 5 Czech Lions including the award for the best film in 2010.
Ženy v pokušení	Jiří Vejdělek	Eliška Balzerová	Comedy	
2011
Alois Nebel	Tomáš Luňák	Miroslav Krobot, Karel Roden	Animated drama	
Autopohádky	various		Animated family film	
Bastardi 2	Jan Lengyel	Tomáš Magnusek	Thriller	
Čertova nevěsta	Zdeněk Troška	Eva Josefíková, Václav Šanda	Fairy tale	"The Devil's Bride" – International (English title)
Czech Made Man	Tomáš Řehořek	Jan Budař	Drama, comedy	
Eighty Letters	Václav Kadrnka		Drama	
Fimfarum – The Third Time Lucky	Kristina Dufková, Vlasta Pospíšilová, David Súkup		Animated family film	
Flower Buds	Zdeněk Jiráský	Vladimír Javorský	Drama	Winner of 4 Czech Lions including the award for the best film in 2011.
Gypsy	Martin Šulík	Jan Mizigar	Drama	Created in minority production with Slovakia.
The House	Zuzana Liová	Miroslav Krobot	Drama	Coproduction with Slovakia
Hranaři	Tomáš Zelenka	Saša Rašilov	Action thriller	
Innocence	Jan Hřebejk	Anna Geislerová, Ondřej Vetchý	Thriller	
Lidice	Petr Nikolaev	Karel Roden	War drama	
Nicky's Family	Matej Mináč	Michal Slaný, Nicholas Winton	Documentary, war drama	
Leaving	Václav Havel	Josef Abrhám	Drama	
Men in Hope	Jiří Vejdělek	Bolek Polívka	Comedy	
Rodina je základ státu	Robert Sedláček	Igor Chmela	Road movie	
St. Helen's Island	Vlastimil Šimůnek		Musical	
The Magical Duvet	F. A. Brabec	Lucie Bílá, Karel Roden	Musical, family film	
Vendeta	Miroslav Ondruš	Ondřej Vetchý, Oldřich Kaiser	Thriller	Directorial debut of Miroslav Ondruš.
2012
7 dní hříchů	Jiří Chlumský	Ondřej Vetchý	Action drama	
A Royal Affair	Nikolaj Arcel	Mads Mikkelsen, Alicia Vikander	Romantic, historic drama	Created in minority coproduction with Denmark and Sweden
Bastardi 3	Tomáš Magnusek	Tomáš Magnusek	Thriller	
Cesta do lesa	Tomáš Vorel	Tomáš Hanák, Tomáš Vorel Jr.	Romantic comedy	Sequel to the 2000 film Out of the City.
Čtyři slunce	Bohdan Sláma	Jaroslav Plesl, Karel Roden	Drama, comedy	
The Blue Tiger	Petr Oukropec		Family film	
Goat Story 2	Jan Tománek	Jiří Lábus	Animated family film	
Hives	Boaz Debby, Michael Lennox, Simon Dolensky, Tomás Kratochvíl, Igor Seregi	Akbar Kurtha, Stefan Lampadius, Nili Tserruya, Lubos Veselý, Ozren Grabaric, Ljubomir Kerekeš	Drama, Comedy	Created in minority production with Croatia.
The Holy Quaternity	Jan Hřebejk		Romantic comedy	
In the Shadow	David Ondříček	Ivan Trojan, Sebastian Koch	Crimi thriller	Winner of 11 Czech Lions including the award for the best film in 2012.
Láska je láska	Milan Cieslar		Comedy	
Líbáš jako ďábel	Marie Poledňáková		Comedy	
Můj vysvlečenej deník	Martin Dolenský	Veronika Khek Kubařová	Comedy	
Odpad město smrt	Jan Hřebejk		Drama	
Sunday League – Pepik Hnatek's Final Match	Jan Prušinovský	Miroslav Krobot, Ondřej Vetchý	Comedy	Prequel to Okresní přebor television series.
Polski film	Marek Najbrt	Tomáš Matonoha, Pavel Liška	Comedy	
Probudím se včera	Miloslav Šmídmajer	Jiří Mádl, Filip Blažek	Romantic comedy	
Signál	Tomáš Řehořek	Vojtěch Dyk, Kryštof Hádek	Comedy	
Vrásky z lásky	Jiří Strach	Radoslav Brzobohatý, Jiřina Bohdalová	Comedy	
2013
August Fools	Taru Mäkelä	Kati Outinen, Miroslav Etzler	Comedy	Co-production with Finland.
Babovřesky	Zdeněk Troška	Lukáš Langmajer	Comedy	The most visited Czech film of the year.
Burning Bush	Agnieszka Holland	Tatiana Pauhofová	Biography drama	Originally released as a mini-series but it was edited into a film. Winner of 11 Czech Lions including the award for the best film in 2013.
Clownwise	Viktor Tauš	Jiří Lábus, Oldřich Kaiser	Comedy	
Colette	Milan Cieslar		Romantic, War drama	
The Don Juans	Jiří Menzel	Jan Hartl	Comedy	
Honeymoon	Jan Hřebejk	Aňa Geislerová, Stanislav Majer	Drama	
Lucky Four Serving the King	Michal Žabka		Animation comedy	
Martin a Venuše	Jiří Chlumský	Marek Taclík, Kristýna Boková-Lišková	Romantic comedy	
My Dog Killer	Mira Fornay		Drama	Created in minority coproduction with Slovakia
President Wanted	Tomáš Kudrna		Documentary	It shows the first direct presidential election in the Czech Republic.
Příběh kmotra	Petr Nikolaev	Ondřej Vetchý, Lukáš Vaculík	Crimi thriller	Based on story of Czech mobster František Mrázek. The second most visited Czech film of the year.
Revival	Alice Nellis	Bolek Polívka	Musical comedy	
Snowpiercer	Bong Joon-ho	Chris Evans	Action science fiction film	Coproduced with South Korea
The Blacksmith from Woodham	Pavel Göbl	Bolek Polívka	Fantasy	
2014
10 Rules	Karel Janák	Matouš Ruml, Miroslav Donutil	Comedy	
All My Tomorrows	Rudolf Havlík	Karel Batěk, Vica Kerekes	Romantic comedy	
Angels	Alice Nellis	Marián Labuda, Vladimír Javorský	Comedy, Drama	Based on a novella by Michal Viewegh
Babovřesky 2	Zdeněk Troška	Lukáš Langmajer	Comedy	
Bohumil Hrabal „Takže se stalo, že...”	Oliver Malina-Morgenstern	Jiří Menzel	Documentary	
Bony a klid 2	Vít Olmer	Roman Skamene, Jakub Prachař	Crimi comedy	Sequel to Bony a klid.
Byeway	Ivo Bystřičan		Documentary	
Dědictví aneb Kurva se neříká	Robert Sedláček	Bolek Polívka	Comedy	
Eugenic Minds	Pavel Štingl		Documentary	
Fair Play	Andrea Sedláčková	Judit Bárdos	Sports Drama film	
Gottland	Viera Čákanyová, Petr Hátle, Rozálie Kohoutová, Lukáš Kokeš and Klára Tasovská		Animated Drama	
Hany	Michal Samir	Jiří Kocman, Hana Vagnerová	Drama, comedy	
Happy Together	Saša Dlouhý		Documentary	
Hodinový Manžel	Tomáš Svoboda	Martin Novotný, Bolek Polívka	Comedy	
In Silence	Zdeněk Jiráský	Judit Bárdos	Biographical	
Intimity	Ivo Macharáček	Zlata Adamovská, Petr Štěpánek	Romantic Comedy	
Jak jsme hráli čáru	Juraj Nvota		Comedy, Drama, History	Set in 1967-68
Kandidát	Jonáš Karásek	Marek Majeský	Comedy, Thriller	Coproduction with Slovakia.
Krásno	Ondřej Sokol	Ondřej Sokol	Crimi comedy	
Lovci a oběti	David Beránek	Jaromír Nosek, Martin Pisařík	Musical film	
Lousy Bastards	Roman Kašparovský	Ondřej Vetchý, Jiří Langmajer	Action comedy	
The Magic Voice of a Rebel	Olga Sommerová	Marta Kubišová	Documentary	A documentary film about Marta Kubišova a Czech singer.
Models Ltd.	David Laňka, Tomáš Magnusek	Regina Rázlová, Evelyna Steimarová	Comedy	
Nowhere in Moravia	Miroslav Krobot	Tatiana Vilhelmová, Ondřej Trojan	Comedy	Directorial debut of Miroslav Krobot.
Olga	Miroslav Janek		Documentary	A documentary about Olga Havlová.
Pirating pirates	David Čálek, Jakub Zahradníček		Documentary	A documentary about Somalian pirates.
Pit-hole	Jiří Stejskal		Documentary	A documentary film about one unique place in Kyiv and about very energic woman Natasha living there.
Places	Radim Špaček	Vladimír Polívka, Johana Matoušková, Jan Cina	Drama	Made by the same team as Walking Too Fast
Storyteller	Vladimír Michálek	Jiří Macháček	Romantic Drama	
Raluca	Zdeněk Viktora	Jan Dolanský, Malvína Pachlová	Crimi Thriller	
Sunrise Supervising	Pavel Göbl	Jiří Lábus	Drama	
Three Brothers	Jan Svěrák	Tomáš Klus, Vojtěch Dyk	Musical fairy tale	
To See the Sea	Jiří Mádl	Ondřej Vetchý, Lucie Trmíková	Comedy	Directorial debut of Jiří Mádl.
Totally Talking	Tomáš Pavlíček	Vít Rohr, Václav Vydra, Jana Krausová	Comedy	
Vejška	Tomáš Vorel	Jiří Mádl, Tomáš Vorel jr.	Comedy	Sequel to Gympl.
Velvet Divorce	Martin Hanzlíček	-	Documentary	
Velvet Terrorists	Peter Kerekes, Ivan Ostrochovský, Pavol Pekarčík	-	Action Documentary	Coproduction with Slovakia. Story is a mix of fiction and reality.
Victoria Angel	Jura Šajmovič	Pavel Řezníček, Anna Kadeřávková	Comedy	
The Way Out	Petr Václav	Klaudia Dudová	Drama	Winner of 7 Czech Lions including the award for the best film in 2014.
Zakázané uvolnění	Jan Hřebejk	Zuzana Stavná, Ondřej Sokol	Comedy	
2015
Aldabra: Byl jednou jeden ostrov	Steve Lichtag	Oldřich Kaiser	Documentary	
Babovřesky 3	Zdeněk Troška	Lukáš Langmajer	Comedy	
Fotograf	Irena Pavláskov	Karel Roden	Comedy, Drama	Based on the Life Story of Jan Saudek
Gangster Ka	Jan Pachl	Hynek Čermák	Action Thriller	Inspired by story of Radovan Krejčíř
Ghoul	Petr Jákl	Jennifer Armour, Jeremy Isabella, Paul S. Tracey	Thriller, Horror	
The Greedy Tiffany	Andy Fehu	Leoš Noha	Horror	
Home Care	Slávek Horák	Bolek Polívka	Drama	Czech entry for the Best Foreign Language Film at the 88th Academy Awards
Hunters and Victims	Marcus Benois Tran	Martin Kraus	Action film	
Jan Hus	Jiří Svoboda	Matěj Hádek	Historical	Based on life of Jan Hus
Journey to Rome	Tomasz Mielnik	Václav Hrzina	Comedy	Co-production with Poland
Karel Zeman: Adventurer in Film	Tomáš Hodan		Documentary	
Last Knights	Kazuaki Kiriya	Clive Owen	Action film	Coproduction with United States and South Korea
Little from the Fish Shop	Jan Balej	Oldřich Kaiser, Anežka Kubátová	Animated film	Inspired by The Little Mermaid
The Little Man	Radek Beran	Saša Rašilov	Animated film	
Lost in Munich	Petr Zelenka	Martin Myšička	Comedy, Drama	
Mallory	Helena Třeštíková		Documentary	
Marguerite	Xavier Giannoli	Catherine Frot	Comedy-drama	
Matrix AB	Vít Klusák		Documentary	A documentary film about Andrej Babiš a Czech politician, entrepreneur and businessman who leads ANO 2011.
Padesátka (The Fifty}	Vojtěch Kotek	Ondřej Pavelka, Jakub Prachař	Comedy	
Rosa & Dara a jejich velká dobrodružství	Martin Duda, Jakub Kouřil, Kateřina Karhánková, Alexandra Hetmerová		Animated film	
Rumbling	Adolf Zika	Tomáš Hajíček, Vica Kerekes	Romantic Drama	
The Great Night	Petr Hátle		Documentary	
Schmitke	Štěpán Altrichter	Peter Kurth	Comedy	
The Seven Ravens	Alice Nellis	Martha Issová	Fairy Tale Film	
The Snake Brothers	Jan Prušinovský	Matěj Hádek, Kryštof Hádek	Crimi Drama	Winner of 6 Czech Lions including the award for the best film in 2015.
Svatý Mikuláš	Petr Smazal	Jiří Bystřický, Daniela Alfonzová	Horror	
Vánoční Kameňák	František Brabec	Václav Vydra	Comedy	Fifth Kameňák film
wave vs. shore	Martin Štrba		Documentary	
Wilson City	Tomáš Mašín	Jiří Macháček, Vojtěch Dyk	Crimi Comedy	
Život je život	Milan Cieslar	Ondřej Vetchý	Action Comedy	
Zpověď zapomenutého	Petr Václav	Karel Roden	Documentary	
2016
Anthropoid	Sean Ellis	Jamie Dornan, Cillian Murphy	War film	Based on the story of “Operation Anthropoid”
Děda	Mejla Basel, Marta Santovjáková Gerlíková, Jiří Novotný	František Šegrado	Family film	
The Devil's Mistress	Filip Renč	Táňa Pauhofová, Karl Markovics	Romantic Historical Drama	Based on the life of Lída Baarová
Dust of the Ground	Vít Zapletal	Radek Valenta	Drama	
Family Film	Olmo Omerzu	Karel Roden, Vanda Hybnerová	Drama, Adventure	
Green Horse Rustlers	Dan Wlodarczyk	Pavel Liška	Adventure, Drama	
I, Olga Hepnarová	Tomáš Weinreb, Petr Kazda	Michalina Olszanska	Psychological drama	About Czech mass murderer Olga Hepnarová
Instalatér z Tuchlovic	Tomáš Vorel	Jakub Kohák	Comedy	
Lady Midday	Jiří Sládek	Aňa Geislerová	Horror	Inspired by a mythical character of the same name.
Manžel na hodinu	Tomáš Svoboda	Martin Novotný, Bolek Polívka	Comedy	Sequel to Hodinový Manžel
MUZIKÁL aneb Cesty ke štěstí	Slobodanka Radun	Roman Vojtek Vica Kerekes	Musical film	
The Oddsockeaters	Galina Miklínová	Ondřej Trojan	Animated film	Based on a book of the same name.
Ostravak Ostravski	David Kočár	Igor Chmela	Comedy	
Pat a Mat ve filmu	Marek Beneš		Animated Family Film	Based on Pat & Mat
The Pregnant	Jiří Kunst, Martin Zahálka, Roman Šafařík	Jan Bárta	Drama	
A Prominent Patient	Julius Ševčík	Karel Roden	Historical Drama	Based on the life of Jan Masaryk. Winner of 12 Czech Lions including the award for the best film in 2016.
Red Captain	Michal Kollár	Maciej Stuhr	Criminal Thriller	Based on the novel of the same name by Dominik Dán.
RINO - Příběh špióna	Jakub Wagner		Documentary	Film is about Karel Köcher, a Czechoslovak spy who infiltrated CIA.
SEZN@MKA	Zita Marinovová	Jiří Langmajer, Adéla Gondíková	Comedy	
The Spooks	Zdeněk Troška	Bronislav Kotiš, Tereza Kostková	Comedy	
Stuck with a Perfect Woman	Tomáš Hoffman	Ondřej Vetchý, Petra Hřebíčková	Romantic comedy	
Syndrom of Summer	Petr Kubík	Ivana Vuković, Jakub Gottwald	Road Movie	
Taxi 121	Daniel Pánek	Filip Tomsa	Thriller	Based on real case of serial killer known as Taxi-killer.
Tenkrát v ráji	Dan Krzywoň, Peter Pálka	Vavřinec Hradilek, Vica Kerekes	Adventure, Romantic	
Theory of Tiger	Radek Bajgar	Jiří Bartoška	Road Movie Comedy	
A Vote for the King of the Romans	Václav Křístek	Kryštof Hádek, Stanislav Majer	Historical film	
We Are Never Alone	Petr Vaclav	Miroslav Hanuš, Karel Roden	Drama	
The Wolf from Royal Vineyard Street	Jan Němec	Jiří Mádl	Comedy, drama	Last film by Jan Němec
2017
8 Heads of Madness	Marta Nováková	Aneta Langerová	Drama	Based on life of Anna Barkova
Absence of Closeness	Josef Tuka	Jana Plodková	Drama	
The Adventurers	Stephen Fung	Andy Lau, Jean Reno	Action	Coproduction with Hong Kong.
Bajkeři	Martin Kopp	Adam Mišík, Jan Komínek, Vojtěch Machuta, Hana Vagnerová	Comedy	
Filthy	Tereza Nvotová	Dominika Morávková-Zeleníková, Anna Rakovská, Anna Šišková	Drama	Coproduction with Slovakia.
The Gardening	Jan Hřebejk	Aňa Geislerová, Martin Finger	Comedy, Drama,	Three-part film. Prequel to Cosy Dens.
Harvie and the Magic Museum	Martin Kotík, Inna Evlannikova		Animation, Adventure, Comedy	
Barefoot	Jan Svěrák	Ondřej Vetchý, Tereza Voříšková	Comedy, Drama	
Ice Mother	Bohdan Sláma	Zuzana Kronerová, Pavel Nový	Romantic, comedy	
Laika	Aurel Klimt	Helena Dvořáková, Jan Vondráček	Animation, Science fiction	Inspired by Laika
Little Crusader	Václav Kadrnka	Karel Roden	Historical	A Crystal Globe winner.
The Lust for Power	Tereza Nvotová	Tereza Nvotová, Milan Žitný, Fedor Flašík	Documentary	Coproduction with Slovakia.
Maria Theresia	Robert Dornhelm	Marie-Luise Stockinger, Vojtěch Kotek	Historical	Based on life of Maria Theresa
Milada	David Mrnka	Ayelet Zurer	Historical	Based on life of Milada Horáková
Muzzikanti	Dušan Rapoš	Michalina Olszańska, Pavel Kříž	Music, comedy	
New Game	Aleš Brunclík		Documentary	A documentary about video game development in the Czech Republic.
Peasant Common Sense	Vít Janeček, Zuzana Piussi		Documentary	A documentary about Andrej Babiš and his business
Přání k mání	Vít Karas	Martin Myšička	Children film	
River Rascals	Jiří Chlumský	Hynek Čermák, Jiří Langmajer, Pavel Liška	Comedy	
Skokan	Petr Vaclav	Julius Oračko	Comedy	
Spoor	Agnieszka Holland	Jakub Gierszał	Crime film	Coproduction with Poland
That Time Together	Jiří Novotný, Marta Santovjáková Gerlíková	František Segrado	Historical	
The Lust for Power	Tereza Nvotová		Documentary	Documentary about former Slovak Prime Minister Vladimír Mečiar
Všechno nebo nic	Marta Ferencová	Táňa Pauhofová	Romantic comedy	
The White World According to Daliborek	Vít Klusák		Documentary	A documentary about Neo-nazi
2018
Alice in the Land of Miracles	Jana Kristina Studničková, Otakáro Maria Schmidt	Viktorie Stříbrná, Bolek Polívka	Fantasy	
Backstage	Andrea Sedláčková	Mária Havranová, Tony Porucha	Musical	
Balada o pilotovi	Ján Sebechlebský	David Švehlík	Historical Drama	
Bear with Us	Tomáš Pavlíček	Ivana Chýlková, Jan Kačer	Comedy	
Breaking News	Tomáš Bojar		Documentary	
Čertoviny	Zdeněk Troška	Jakub Prachař	Fairy tale	
Doktor Martin: Záhada v Beskydech	Petr Zahrádka	Miroslav Donutil	Crime, Comedy	Tied to TV series Doktor Martin
Domestique	Adam Sedlák	Jiří Konvalinka	Sport, Drama	
Ducat Rock	Ján Novák	Martin Dejdar	Children's Film	
Dukla 61	David Ondříček	Marek Taclík, Martha Issová	Disaster film	Based on a mining disaster in Dukla Mine that killed 108 Miners.
Dvě nevěsty a jedna svatba	Tomáš Svoboda	Anna Polívková, Ester Geislerová	Comedy	
Hastrman	Ondřej Havelka	Karel Dobrý	Romantic Thriller	
I Do Not Care If We Go Down in History as Barbarians	Radu Jude	Ioana Iacob, Alexandru Dabija	War, Drama	Created in minority production with other countries.
Insects	Jan Švankmajer	Jiří Lábus, Jan Budař	Animated	
Inside Mosul	Jan Andert		Documentary	
Intimate Enemy	Karel Janák	Vojtěch Dyk, Gabriela Marcinková	Thriller	
Into the Wind	Sofie Šustková	Vladimír Polívka, Jenovéfa Boková, Matyáš Řezníček	Drama	
The Interpreter	Martin Šulík	Jiří Menzel, Peter Simonischek	Drama	
Jan Palach	Robert Sedláček	Viktor Zavadil	Historical	
Kluci z hor	Tomáš Magnusek	Martin Dejdar, Jiří Lábus	Comedy	
The Magic Quill	Marek Najbrt	Judit Bárdos, Jan Cina	Fantasy	
May the Lord Be with Us	Zdeněk Jiráský	Karel Dobrý	Historical	
Metanol	Tereza Kopáčová	Lukáš Vaculík, Martin Finger, Veronika Freimanová	Crime, Drama	About 2012 methanol poisonings.
Miss Hanoi	Zdeněk Viktora	David Novotný, Ha Thanh Špetlíková	Crime	
Moments	Beata Parkanová	Jenovéfa Boková	Drama	
My Uncle Archimedes	Georgis Agathonikiadis	Ondřej Vetchý, Miroslav Donutil	Comedy, Drama	
Short Cut	Jakub Šmíd	Jindřich Skokan	Drama	
Pat a Mat znovu v akci	Marek Beneš		Animation	Based on Pat & Mat characters
Patrimony	Jiří Vejdělek	Eliška Balzerová, Tatiana Vilhelmová	Comedy	
Pepa	Ján Novák	Michal Suchánek	Comedy	
Po čem muži touží	Rudolf Havlík	Anna Polívková, Jiří Langmajer	Comedy	
Prezident Blaník	Marek Najbrt	Marek Daniel	Political satire	Based on 2018 presidential election
Rašín	Jiří Svoboda	Ondřej Vetchý	Historical	Based on life of Alois Rašín
The Russian Job	Petr Horký		Documentary	Focuses on Bo Andersson and his time as the President of AvtoVAZ
Špindl	Milan Cieslar	Kateřina Klausová, Oldřich Navrátil, Anna Polívková	Comedy	
Supervising the Meaning of Dreams	Pavel Göbl	Vratislav Brabenec	Comedy	Sequel to Sunrise Supervising
Talks with TGM	Jakub Červenka	Jan Budař, Martin Huba	Historical	
Teambuilding	Ján Novák	Miloslav Mejzlík, Alice Bendová	Comedy	
Toman	Ondřej Trojan	Jiří Macháček	Historical, Action, Drama	The film is about Zdeněk Toman, head of Czechoslovak Foreign Intelligence Service
Trash on Mars	Benjamin Tuček	Jiří Havelka	Science fiction, Comedy	
Úsměvy smutných mužů	Dan Svátek	David Švehlík	Drama	
Věčně tvá nevěrná	Milan Cieslar	Lenka Vlasáková, Saša Rašilov	romantic comedy	
A War Within	Kasper Torsting	Tom Wlaschiha Natalie Madueño	Romantic War Drama	Coproduction with Denmark
We Can Do Better	Robin Kvapil, Radim Procházka		Documentary	Chronicles Michal Horáček's 2018 presidential campaign.
Winter Flies	Olmo Omerzu	Tomáš Mrvík, Jan František Uher	Drama	
Zlatý podraz	Radim Špaček	Filip Březina	Sport	
Zoufalé ženy dělají zoufalé věci	Filip Renč	Klára Issová	Comedy	
2019
Abstinent	David Vigner	Josef Trojan	Drama	
Amnesty	Jonáš Karásek	Aňa Geislerová, Marek Vašut	Thriller	Coproduction with Slovakia.
The Best We Can	Alejandro Fernández Almendras	Jiří Mádl, Marika Šoposká	Comedy, Drama	
The Cage	Jiří Strach	Jiřina Bohdalová, Kryštof Hádek	Thriller	
A Certain Kind of Silence	Michal Hogenauer	Eliška Křenková	Thriller	
Cena za štěstí	Olga Dabrowská	Ivana Chýlková	Drama	
Closer to the Stars	Lenka Kny	Anna Polívková, Martin Dejdar	Romantic comedy	
Communism and the Net or The End of Representative Democracy	Karel Vachek	Karel Vachek	Documentary	Longest Czech film ever made.
Daughter	Daria Kashcheeva		Animated	Nominated for Academy Award for the Best Animated Short Film.
Freedom in the Air	David Balda	Pavel Neškudla, Jiří Dvořák	Drama	
The Glass Room	Julius Ševčík	Karel Roden, Hanna Alström	Historical, Drama	
Great Adventure of the Lucky Four	Michal Žabka		Animated, Adventure	
Happy New Year	Jakub Kroner	Tatiana Pauhofová, Emília Vášáryová	Romantic Comedy	
The Humorist	Mikhail Idov	Yuri Kolokolnikov	Drama	Coproduction with Russia and Latvia.
Karel, Me and You	Bohdan Karásek	Jenovéfa Boková, Miroslav Faderholz, Miloslav König	Comedy, Drama	
The Last Aristocrat	Jiří Vejdělek	Hynek Čermák, Tatiana Vilhelmová	Comedy	
LOVEhunt	Karel Janák	Ester Geislerová	Romantic, Comedy	
The Painted Bird	Václav Marhoul	Petr Kotlár	War, Drama	Selected to play in competition at the 76th Venice International Film Festival. Czech entry for the Best International Feature Film at the 92nd Academy Awards.
Old-Timers	Martin Dušek Ondřej Provazník	Jiří Schmitzer, Ladislav Mrkvička	Drama	
On the Roof	Jiří Mádl	Alois Švehlík	Comedy, Drama	
Owners	Jiří Havelka	Tereza Voříšková, Vojtěch Kotek	Comedy	
Pardon	Jan Jakub Kolski	Gražyna Blecká-Kolská, Jan Jankowsk	Drama	Coproduction with Poland
The Prague Orgy	Irena Pavlásková	Jonas Chernick	Historical	Based on novella of the same name.
The Princess and Half the Kingdom	Karel Janák	Matouš Ruml, Marek Eben	Fairy Tale	
Román pro pokročilé	Zita Marinovová	Marek Vašut	Comedy	
Shotgun Justice	Radek Bajgar	Iva Janžurová, Martin Hofmann	Comedy	
Snowing!	Kristina Nedvědová	Petra Nesvačilová, Hana Vagnerová	Drama	
Scent of Oranges	Ivan Pokorný	Tomáš Dalecký, Emilie Neumeister	Romantic, Drama	
Summer with Gentleman	Jiří Adamec	Jaromír Hanzlík	Romantic Comedy	
National Street	Štěpán Altrichter	Hynek Čermák	Drama	
Špindl 2	Radek Balaš	Radim Fiala, Kateřina Kaira Hrachovcová Anna Polívková	Comedy	
Úhoři mají nabito	Vladimír Michálek	Oldřich Kaiser, Matěj Hádek	Crime, Comedy	
Watchmaker's Apprentice	Jitka Rudolfová	Michal Balcar, Viktor Preiss	Fairy Tale	
Women on the Run	Martin Horský	Zlata Adamovská	Comedy	
