= 2019 Czech Lion Awards =

Czech film and TV award ceremony

27th Czech Lion Awards
- Date: March 7, 2020
- Site: Rudolfinum, Prague
- Hosted by: Václav Kopta
- Directed by: Marek Najbrt

Highlights
- Best Picture: The Painted Bird
- Best Actor: Jiří Schmitzer; Old-Timers
- Best Actress: Tereza Ramba; Owners
- Best Supporting Actor: Ladislav Mrkvička; Old-Timers
- Best Supporting Actress: Klára Melíšková; Owners
- Most awards: The Painted Bird (9)
- Most nominations: Owners (12)

Television coverage
- Network: Česká televize
- Ratings: 863,000

2019 Czech Lion Awards ceremony was held on 7 March 2020, moderated by Václav Kopta. Nominations were announced on 15 January 2020. Owners received highest number of nominations. The Painted Bird then won in 9 categories including the Best film.

== Schedule ==
Date	Event
15 January 2020	Nominees Announced
10 February 2020	Television Nominations announced
7 March 2020	Awards Ceremony

== Winners and nominees ==
Nominations were announced on 15 January 2020. Owners received 12 nominations. The Painted Bird was nominated for 11 categories and won non-statutory award for the Best Poster. Old-Timers was third most successful film with 10 nominations.

On 10 February 2020 nominations in television Categories were announced.

Ceremony was held on 8 March 2020. The Painted Bird has won 9 Awards.

Best Film	Best Director
The Painted Bird; A Certain Kind of Silence; Old-Timers; On the Roof; Owners	Václav Marhoul - The Painted Bird; Martin Dušek, Ondřej Provazník - Old-Timers; Jiří Havelka - Owners; Michal Hogenauer - A Certain Kind of Silence; Jiří Mádl - On the Roof
Best Actor in a Leading Role	Best Actress in a Leading Role
Jiří Schmitzer - Old-Timers; Hynek Čermák - National Street; Petr Kotlár - The Painted Bird; Jiří Lábus - Owners; Alois Švehlík - On the Roof	Tereza Ramba - Owners; Dagmar Havlová - Owners; Jenovéfa Boková - Karel, Me and You; Iva Janžurová - Shotgun Justice; Eliška Křenková - A Certain Kind of Silence
Best Actor in a Supporting Role	Best Actress in a Supporting Role
Ladislav Mrkvička - Old-Timers; Jan Cina - National Street; Vojtěch Kotek - Owners; David Novotný - Owners; Duy Anh Tran - On the Roof	Klára Melíšková - Owners; Jitka Čvančarová - The Painted Bird; Aňa Geislerová - Amnesty; Kateřina Janečková - National Street; Pavla Tomicová - Owners
Best Screenplay	Best Editing
Owners; Karel, Me and You; Old-Timers; On the Roof; The Painted Bird	The Painted Bird; Amnesty; Over the Hills; Old-Timers; Owners
Best Cinematography	Stage Design
The Painted Bird; Amnesty; The Glass Room; On the Roof; Old-Timers	The Painted Bird; Amnesty; The Glass Room; The Last Aristocrat; Watchmaker's Apprentice
Makeup and Hairstyling	Costume Design
The Painted Bird; Amnesty; The Glass Room; Old-Timers; Watchmaker's Apprentice	The Painted Bird; The Glass Room; The Last Aristocrat; Owners; Watchmaker's Apprentice
Music	Sound
Watchmaker's Apprentice; Amnesty; The Glass Room; Old-Timers; On the Roof	The Painted Bird; Amnesty; A Certain Kind of Silence; The Glass Room; Old-Timers
Extraordinary audiovisual achievement	Best Documentary
Václav Marhoul - The Painted Bird	Over the Hills; Forman vs. Forman; Jiří Bělohlávek: „Když já tak rád diriguju...“; Jiří Suchý - Tackling Life with Ease; Jiří Trnka: A Long Lost Friend
Best Television Film or Miniseries	Best TV Series
Monsters of the Shore; The Cage; Non-stop Deli	Most!; The End of Dejvice Theatre; The Sleepers (TV series)
Unique Contribution to Czech Film
Jaromír Kallista

=== Non-statutory Awards ===
Best Film Poster	Film Fans Award
The Painted Bird; Central Bus Station; Punk is Now!; A Certain Kind of Silence; Owners	Women on the Run
Magnesie Award for Best Student Film
Daughter; Anežka; Deserter; The End; The Player

=== Films with multiple wins and nominations ===
Wins	Nominations	Films
9	11	The Painted Bird
3	12	Owners
2	10	Old-Timers
1	4	Watchmaker's Apprentice
1	2	Over the Hills
0	7	Amnesty
0	7	On the Roof
0	6	The Glass Room
0	4	A Certain Kind of Silence
0	3	National Street
0	2	Karel, Me and You
0	2	The Last Aristocrat
