= Heracleia (festival) =

Ancient Greek festival honoring Heracles

The Heracleia (Ancient Greek: Ἡράκλεια ἐν Κυνοσάργει Herakleia en Kynosargei) were ancient festivals honoring the divine hero Heracles.

The ancient Athenians celebrated the festival, which commemorated the death of Heracles, on the second day of the month of Metageitnion (which would fall in late July or early August), at the Cynosarges gymnasium at the demos Diomeia outside the walls of Athens, in a sanctuary dedicated to Heracles. His priests were drawn from the list of boys who were not full Athenian citizens (nothoi). Many famous nothoi exercised there (such as Demosthenes) but it was probably not exclusively set aside for them.

The Attic cults of Herakles were often closely connected with youth: at several of his cult sites there was a gymnasium attached, and there was a mythological tradition (perhaps originating in Boeotia) that after Heracles died he was translated to Olympus, where he married Hebe, the personification of youth. Because of this Heracles is sometimes worshipped as a god and sometimes as a dead hero.

In Thebes, the center of the cult of Heracles, the festivities lasted a number of days, and consisted of various athletic and musical contests (agones), as well as sacrifices. They were celebrated in the gymnasium of Iolaus, the nephew and eromenos of Heracles, and were known as the Iolaeia. The winners were awarded brass tripods and were crowned with garlands of myrtle.

"Heracleia" is also a female first name, from which the common Romanian first name Raluca is ultimately derived, via the Greek name Ralloú.

== See also ==
- Athenian festivals
