= Amnesty (disambiguation) =

Amnesty is a pardon extended by the government to a group or class of persons.

Amnesty may also refer to:

- Amnesty (2011 film), a 2011 Albanian drama film
- Amnesty (2019 film), a 2019 Slovak-Czech thriller film
- Amnesty (I), a 2016 album by Crystal Castles
- Amnesty Act, an act that removed restriction from secessionists in the American Civil War
- Amnesty clause, a salary cap provision in the National Basketball Association (NBA)
- Amnesty International, a human rights organization
  - Amnesty the game, a game related to Amnesty International
- Amnesty for Polish citizens in the Soviet Union
- Amnesty of 1947, a law for soldiers and activists of the Polish anti-communist underground
- Clapper v. Amnesty International USA, a US Supreme Court case dealing with a challenge to Section 702 of the Foreign Intelligence Surveillance Act
- Tax amnesty, an opportunity for forgiveness of a tax liability
- Amnesty (novel), the fifth novel from Aravind Adiga
