= The Affair (2019 film) =

2019 film

- Film poster
- Czech: Skleněný pokoj
- Directed by: Julius Ševčík
- Written by: Andrew Shaw
- Starring: Hanna Alström, Karel Roden
- Cinematography: Martin Štrba
- Edited by: Jarosław Kamiński
- Music by: Antoni Komasa-Łazarkiewicz; Rupert Vokmann
- Distributed by: Bioscop
- Release date: 14 March 2019
- Running time: 104 minutes
- Country: Czech Republic
- Language: English
- Budget: 80 million CZK
- Box office: 14.6 million CZK

The Affair (Czech: Skleněný pokoj, lit. 'The glass room') is a 2019 Czech drama film directed by Julius Ševčík. It stars Hanna Alström, Karel Roden and Carice van Houten. It is based on The Glass Room, a novel by Simon Mawer, which tells the story of a fictional house based on the Ludwig Mies van der Rohe-designed Villa Tugendhat in Brno, Czech Republic, where the movie was filmed.

== Plot ==
Wealthy newlyweds Liesel and Viktor have enlisted a famous architect, Rainer von Abt to build them a new home, which becomes the talk of 1930s Czechoslovakia. Liesel’s friend Hana is nursing seemingly unrequited romantic feelings for her pal, while Viktor is caught in the act with nanny Kata. On the eve of the Nazi invasion, Liesel and Viktor flee to neutral Switzerland with their two children. Almost immediately, Liesel misses her friend and realises her feelings were more than platonic.

== Cast ==
- Hanna Alström as Liesel Landauer
- Karel Roden as Rainer von Abt
- Carice van Houten as Hana
- Claes Bang as Viktor Landauer
- Roland Møller as Stahl
- Alexandra Borbély as Kata
- Karel Dobrý as Laník
- Zuzana Fialová as Laníková
- Brian Caspe as Gestapo Officer
- Petra Bučková as Neighbour
- Jana Plodková as STB officer
- Vladimír Polívka as Martin
- Martin Hofmann as Oskar
- Olga Plojhar Bursíková as Lenka
- Vladimír Javorský as Veselý

== Reception ==
The film was nominated for Czech Lion Awards in 2019 for Best Cinematography, Stage Design, Makeup and Hairstyling, Costume Design, Music and Sound.
