= Big Man (2024 film) =

- Film poster
- Directed by: Radek Beran
- Screenplay by: Lumír Tuček, Radek Beran
- Produced by: Jakub Červenka; Petr Kratochvíl
- Starring: Saša Rašilov
- Cinematography: Jan Baset Střítežský
- Music by: Milan Cais
- Production companies: Bedna Films; Czech Television
- Distributed by: Bontonfilm
- Release dates: 2 May 2024 (Cinema on the Border); 3 October 2024
- Running time: 72 minutes
- Country: Czech Republic
- Language: Czech

Big Man (Czech: Velký pán) is a 2024 Czech stop-motion animated adventure film directed by Radek Beran. It is a sequel to 2015 film The Little Man.

The film premiered on 2 May 2024 at the Cinema on the Border festival.

== Plot ==
Following events of previous film Little Man enjoys social life in the forest village. He runs a forest kiosk with Majolenka and plays in a band with his friends. One day, peaceful atmosphere of the neighborhood is disturbed by posters warning of Deers. Robots install special "Zetkoscopes" in houses, which show the horrors committed by the Deers. Robots promise to protect the inhabitants if they pay a fee to Dr. Zetek. Those who do not pay are interned in a labor camp "for their own good". The Captain and Majolenka do not take the threats seriously, but Little Man begins to succumb to a growing fear that he must overcome together with Majolenka.

== Voice actors ==
- Saša Rašilov as Big Man
- Barbora Poláková as Majolenka
- Pavel Liška as Dr. Zetek
- David Novotný as Captain
- Miroslav Táborský as Promodral
- Vladimír Javorský as Mistr Drobný
- Jan Maxián as Mole
- Jan Vondráček as Knihomolov
- Miroslav Krobot as Woodpecker
- Jakub Žáček as Hairy guy
