= Cosmic (TV series) =

- Directed by: Jan Bártek
- Starring: David Novotný; Jakub Žáček; Petr Vančura; Eva Josefíková
- Country of origin: Czech Republic
- Original language: Czech
- No. of seasons: 1
- No. of episodes: 5

Production
- Running time: 21-25 minutes

Original release
- Network: Czech Television
- Release: 2016 – 2016

Cosmic (Czech: Kosmo) is a Czech Science fiction sitcom. It is about Czech flight to the Moon which was to be funded by money from the European Union. The money was tunnelled but the flight must still happen due to impending fine.

It was broadcast in fall of 2016 on Czech Television. First three episodes were already shown on 25 and 30 July 2016 at the Summer Film School and during September at Bio Oko in Prague and the Scala cinema in Brno. It was also presented as part of the International Film Festival in Karlovy Vary.

It was nominated for the Czech Lion in the Best Drama Series category.

== Cast ==
- Martin Myšička as minister Lubor Šnajdr
- David Novotný as technician Karel Cikán
- Jiří Hána as Libor Repelent
- Jakub Žáček as astrophysicist René Hejl
- Jana Plodková as captain Milada Musilová
- Petr Vančura as second pilot Petr Chromý
- Eva Josefíková as Miss Kurník Agáta Kašpárková
- Václav Kopta as space program director Ing. Milan Sumec
- Martin Dejdar as Anton Hrabiš
- Lenka Krobotová as Dona Drobková
- Marie Ludvíková as cook Filoména

== Episodes ==
1. Sumec nemá kníry
2. Česká škola
3. Smrt docenta
4. Řekl někdo kočička?
5. Triumf
