= Island (2023 film) =

- Directed by: Rudolf Havlík
- Written by: Rudolf Havlík
- Produced by: Petr Erben
- Starring: Jiří Langmajer, Jana Plodková
- Cinematography: Václav Tlapák
- Music by: Ondřej Konvička
- Production company: Logline Production
- Distributed by: CinemArt
- Release date: 2 February 2023
- Running time: 100 minutes
- Country: Czech Republic
- Language: Czech
- Budget: 20-30 Million CZK
- Box office: 53,417,361 CZK

Island (Czech: Ostrov) is a 2023 Czech adventure romantic comedy film directed by Rudolf Havlík and starring Jiří Langmajer and Jana Plodková. Filming took place at the end of 2021 in Thailand. The first trailer for the film was released on November 11, 2022. It is inspired by Six Days, Seven Nights. The film premiered on 2 February 2023.

== Plot ==
Richard and Alice, a married couple, go on a vacation to a tropical resort. Richard announces to Alice that he wants to divorce her. When their flight crashes after a hasty trip back and they find themselves on a deserted island, they are forced to work together and forget their differences.

== Cast ==
- Jiří Langmajer as Richard
- Jana Plodková as Alice
- Ted Otis as Jimmy Holiday
