= Jana Krausová =

Czech actress

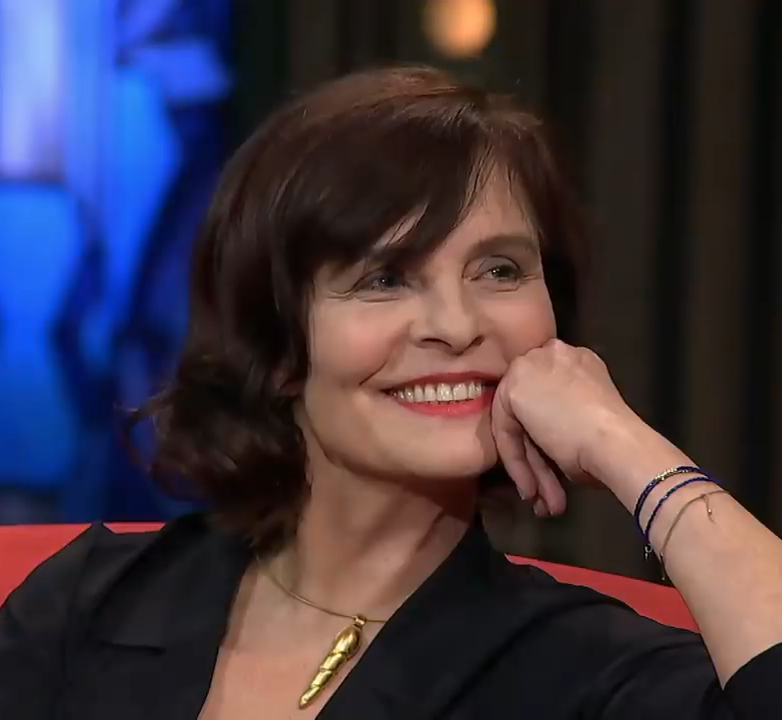
- Born: Jana Pehrová; 25 January 1954 (age 71); Prague, Czechoslovakia
- Occupation: Actress
- Years active: 1967-present

Jana Krausová (née Pehrová; born 25 January 1954) is a Czech actress. She was formerly married to actor Jan Kraus. Krausová is also an experienced artist, having presented works in art exhibitions both in the Czech Republic and abroad. Krausová is a long-term theatre collaborator with Karel Roden, having worked together on seven plays since starring together in the 2002 Czech version of the Dario Fo production The Open Couple.

At the moment she can be found at Theatre Studio DVA in several performances.

== Selected filmography ==
- Scalpel, Please (1985)
- Helluva Good Luck (1999)
- Ulice (television, 2005)
- Pleasant Moments (2006)
- Kajínek (2010)
- The Magical Duvet (2011)
- Family Film (2015)
