= Family Film =

2015 Czech drama adventure film by Olmo Omerzu

- Theatrical release poster
- Czech: Rodinný film
- Directed by: Olmo Omerzu
- Starring: Karel Roden; Vanda Hybnerová
- Release dates: 21 September 2015 (San Sebastián); 18 February 2016 (Czech Republic)
- Running time: 95 minutes
- Country: Czech Republic
- Language: Czech

Family Film (Czech: Rodinný film) is a 2015 Czech drama adventure film by Slovenian director Olmo Omerzu.

The story is about teenagers whose parents go on vacation, leaving them at home and the family dog, Otto, on a deserted island. It was shot in Prague and Thailand.

Family Film won two Czech Film Critics' Awards, Best Film and Best Screenplay.

== Cast ==
- Daniel Kadlec as Erik
- Jenovéfa Boková as Anna, Erik's sister
- Karel Roden as Igor, their father
- Vanda Hybnerová as Irena, their mother
- Martin Pechlát as Martin, Igor's brother
- Eliška Křenková as Kristína, Anna's friend and Erik's girlfriend
- Miroslav Sabadin as Tomáš
- Vojtěch Záveský as Robert
- Jaroslav Plesl as doctor
- Jana Krausová as headmistress Pernerová
