= Bylo nás pět =

- Genre: Comedy
- Based on: Bylo nás pět by Karel Poláček
- Directed by: Karel Smyczek
- Starring: Adam Novák; Jaroslav Pauer; Štěpán Benyovszký; Jan Brynych; Jan Müller; Oldřich Navrátil; Dagmar Veškrnová
- Original language: Czech
- No. of seasons: 1
- No. of episodes: 6

Production
- Running time: 60 minutes
- Production company: Czech Television

Original release
- Release: 9 January – 13 February 1995

Bylo nás pět is a Czech comedy television series. It is based on a book by Karel Poláček. Karel Smyczek directed the series.

It was broadcast by Czech Television in January 1995. The series has six episodes and enjoys constant repetition on television screens and the interest of viewers.

== Plot ==
The series takes place in 1930s. The plot follows a small boy Petr Bajza, who together with his friends Čeňek Jirsák, Antonín Bejval, Eda Kemlink and Pepek Zilvar experience various adventures. The plot also follows the fate of Peter's family and the budding relationship between Kristýna and the young womanizer Pivoda.

== Cast and characters ==
- Adam Novák as Petr Bajza
- Jaroslav Pauer as Čeněk Jirsák
- Štěpán Benyovszký as Antonín Bejval
- Jan Brynych as Eda Kemlink
- Jan Müller as Pepek Zilvar
- Oldřich Navrátil as Mr. Bajza
- Dagmar Veškrnová as Mrs. Bajzová
- Barbora Srncová as Kristýna „Rampepurda“
- Jiří Langmajer as Pivoda

== Production ==
Ondřej Vogeltanz, Karel Smyczek and Helena Slavíková participated in the adaptation of the novel by Karel Poláček. The series is supplemented with motifs from other Poláček books, such as the book District Town. In the novel characters of the Bajza family are also depicted much less. Vogeltanz and Smyczek wanted to develop relationships between them.

Filming took place during 130 days in the town of Kouřim and in Barrandov Studios interiors.
