= Přístav =

Czech television series

- Genre: Comedy
- Written by: Lucie Konečná; Magdalena Turnovská; Jan Drbohlav; Tomáš Grombíř; Lucie Stropnická; Barbora Vlnasová; Marcela Kopecká; Tomáš Hořava
- Directed by: Jana Rezková (2015–2017), Jaromír Polišenský (2015–2016), Ján Novák (2015–2016)
- Starring: Filip Blažek; Pavel Řezníček; Vanda Hybnerová
- Country of origin: Czech Republic
- Original language: Czech
- No. of seasons: 2
- No. of episodes: 106

Production
- Running time: 60 minutes

Original release
- Network: Prima
- Release: August 26, 2015 – June 16, 2017

Přístav is a Czech television programme which was broadcast from 2015 to 2017. In Czech přístav means 'port'. The programme was written by various writers and directed by Jana Rezková (2015–2017), Jaromír Polišenský (2015–2016) and Ján Novák (2015–2016). The series was nominated as Best Television Drama at the 2015 Czech Lion Awards. Actress Vanda Hybnerová's father, Boris Hybner, appeared alongside her in one of the episodes.

== Cast ==
- Filip Blažek
- Pavel Řezníček
- Vanda Hybnerová
- Petr Čtvrtníček
- Kateřina Hrachovcová-Hercíková
- Martin Zounar
- Kristýna Kociánová
- Martin Dejdar
- Jitka Schneiderová
- Sandra Černodrinská
- Václav Jiráček
- Markéta Žroutová
- Norbert Lichý
- Bohumil Klepl
- Hana Gregorová
- Ladislav Potměšil
- Olga Želenská
- Zuzana Slavíková
- Petr Lexa
- Natálie Grossová
- Jan Szymik
- Adam Drábek
- Petr Klimeš
