= Tereza Bebarová =

Czech actress and voice artist

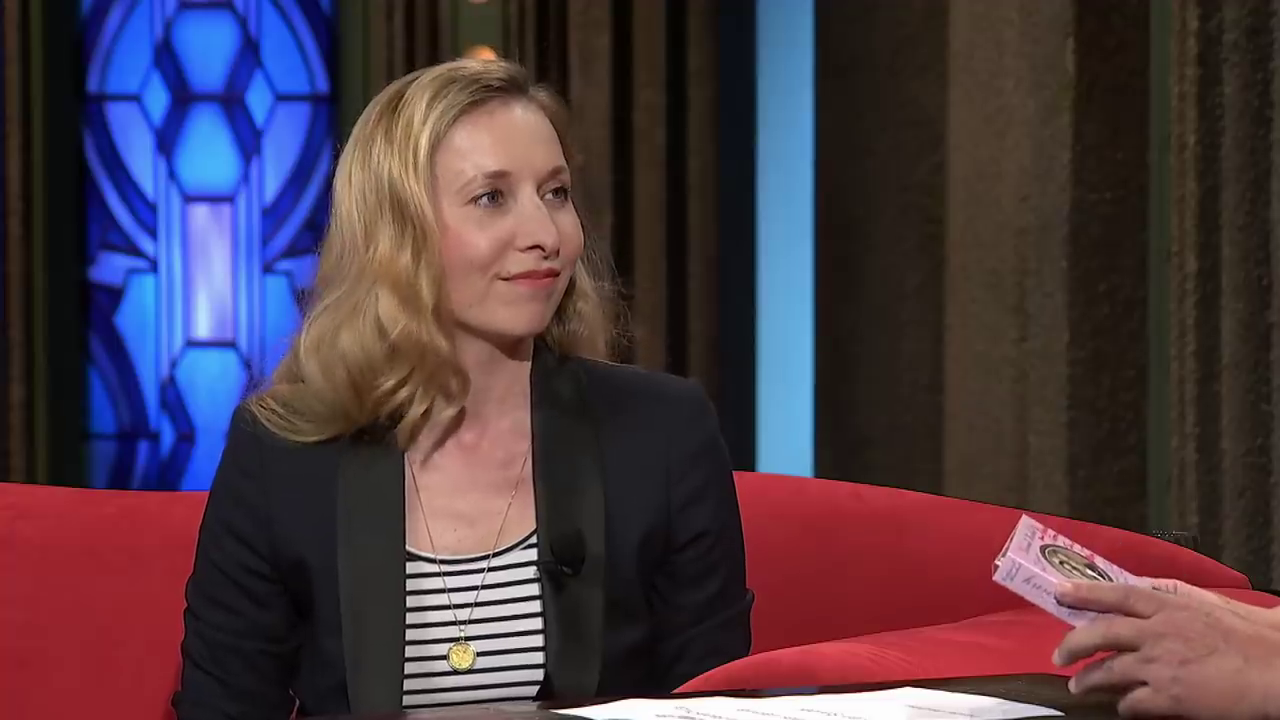
- Born: 8 July 1975 (age 50); Bohumín, Czechoslovakia
- Occupations: Actress; voice artist
- Children: 2

Tereza Bebarová is a Czech stage, television actress and voice artist.

== Biography ==
She was born on 8 July 1975 in Bohumín, Karviná District, Czechoslovakia. In childhood she liked singing and dancing. Bebarová studied Acting at the Conservatory in Ostrava. She has performed at the Petr Bezruč Theatre. She is the Czech voice of Jorja Fox, Evangeline Lilly, Nicole de Boer and Eva Longoria.

== Theatre ==
=== Divadlo Na Fidlovačce ===
- Le baruffe chiozzotte
- Hamlet .... Ophelia
- Our Town .... Emilie
- Balada pro banditu .... Erzsika
- Julie umírá každou noc .... Julie
- Funny Girl .... Fanny Brice
- My Fair Lady .... Elisa Doolitle

== Filmography ==
- Doktor od jezera hrochů (2010)
- Malé lži (2009
- Poslední kouzlo (2006) (TV)
- "Ulice" (2005) TV series .... Svetlana Lisechko (2007–2009)
- Hypnóza (2004) (TV)
- Stará láska nerezaví (2003 (TV)
- Politik a herečka (2000) (TV)
- Všichni moji blízcí (1999)
- Průběžná Otrava krve (1997)
- Konto separato (1996) (TV)

== Episode role in TV series ==
- Strážce duší (2005) playing ??? in episode: "???" 2005
- Zdivočelá země (1997) playing ??? in episode: "???"
- Četnické humoresky (1997) playing Zofie in episode: "28"
