= Sever (TV series) =

- Genre: Crime, Thriller
- Directed by: Robert Sedláček
- Starring: Jiří Mádl; Štěpán Benoni; Aleš Bílík
- Country of origin: Czech Republic
- Original language: Czech
- No. of seasons: 1
- No. of episodes: 6

Production
- Running time: 52 minutes

Original release
- Network: ČT1
- Release: September 2 – October 7, 2019

Sever (North) is a Czech crime thriller television series broadcast on Czech Television in 2019. The plot is set in the region of northern Bohemia around 2010 and is based on real events; the main character, a young official and later a promising criminalist, struggles with political corruption and the "impunity" of some people in his previous and new jobs. He stumbles and becomes an outlaw because – true to his ideals – he does not want to play the game of his police pack.

The psychologically conceived series abounds with several storylines and surprising twists. It was presented on August 22, 2019, and premiered on September 2 on the public channel ČT1. Together with the ten-episode Pleasure Principle, it was the main crime series of the autumn broadcast of Czech Television.

== Shooting ==
The creators filmed all six episodes from March to the beginning of May 2019 in Ústí, right at the scene.

== Cast ==
- Jiří Mádl as policeman Petr Svoboda
- Eliška Křenková as Lucie Svobodová
- Štěpán Benoni as policeman Vítek Brázdil
- Aleš Bílík as Marek Hanus
- Petra Špalková as Prosecutor
- Taťjana Medvecká as Syrová
- Pavla Beretová as Vránová
- Martin Pechlát as Rostislav Valenta
- Martin Myšička as Judge
- Luboš Veselý as Mjr. Filip Suchý
