= Alois Nebel =

2011 Czech animated drama film

- Theatrical release poster
- Directed by: Tomáš Luňák
- Screenplay by: Jaroslav Rudiš; Jaromír 99
- Based on: White Brook, Main Station and Golden Hills by Jaroslav Rudiš and Jaromír 99
- Produced by: Pavel Strnad; Milan Kuchynka
- Starring: Miroslav Krobot; Marie Ludvíková; Karel Roden
- Cinematography: Jan Baset Střítežský
- Edited by: Petr Říha
- Music by: Petr Kružík
- Production company: Negativ
- Distributed by: Aerofilms
- Release dates: 4 September 2011 (Venice Film Festival); 29 September 2011
- Running time: 84 minutes
- Country: Czech Republic / Germany
- Language: Czech
- Budget: €2.5 million
- Box office: $664,185

Alois Nebel is a 2011 adult animated neo-noir drama film directed by Tomáš Luňák, based on the comic-book trilogy by Jaroslav Rudiš and Jaromír 99. It is set in the late 1980s in a small village in the Jeseník Mountains, close to the Polish border, and tells the story of a train dispatcher who begins to suffer from hallucinations where the present converges with the dark past of the expulsion of Germans after World War II. The black-and-white film was animated mainly through rotoscoping and stars Miroslav Krobot as the title character. The film was selected as the Czech entry for the Best Foreign Language Film at the 84th Academy Awards, but it did not make the final shortlist. The film was submitted and won European Film Awards for Best Animated Film.

== Cast ==
- Miroslav Krobot as Alois Nebel
- Marie Ludvíková as Květa
- Leoš Noha as Wachek
- Karel Roden as The Mute
- Alois Švehlík as Wachek Sr.
- David Švehlík as Wachek Sr. in his youth
- Ondřej Malý as Olda
- Ján Sedal as Šokin
- Tereza Voříšková as Dorothe
- Marek Daniel as Psychiatrist
- Simona Babčáková as Berta
- Ivan Trojan as The Director of Czech Railways
- Klára Melíšková as Nurse
- Jan Vondráček as SNB officer
- Karel Zima as SNB officer
- Thomas Zielinski as Undertaker
- Martin Myšička as Polish criminalist
- Marek Pospíchal as Polish criminalist
- Václav Neužil as Colporter

== Production ==
Based on Jaroslav Rudiš' and Jaromír 99's trilogy of comic books about the character Alois Nebel, White Brook, Main Station and Golden Hills, the film project was first presented at the 2009 International Film Festival Rotterdam's CineMart co-production market. Shortly after that it was picked up for international sales by The Match Factory. Production is led by the Czech company Negativ, and co-produced with Pallas Film in Germany and Tobogang in Slovakia. The film has a budget of 2.5 million euro. It is the feature-film debut of director Tomáš Luňák, who previously had made animated music videos and advertisements. Filming of Alois Nebel started in 2008.

== Release ==
The film premiered out of competition at the 68th Venice International Film Festival on 4 September 2011. It was also screened at the 2011 Toronto International Film Festival. was scheduled to be released in the Czech Republic on 29 September 2011 through Aerofilms.

=== Critical reception ===
Kirk Honeycutt of The Hollywood Reporter called the animation "a sheer wonder" and the film "a bracing experience for those who want animation to be more than 3D superheroics and anthropomorphic animal stories". He wrote that "Ultimately, the film may delve into too much specific Czech history and central European psychology to travel beyond those territories to other than film festivals", but "The glory of the film lies not in its story but rather in its atmosphere and imagery".

== See also ==
- 2011 in film
- Cinema of the Czech Republic
- Czech films of the 2010s
- List of animated feature films
- List of black-and-white films produced since 1970
- List of submissions to the 84th Academy Awards for Best Foreign Language Film
- List of Czech submissions for the Academy Award for Best Foreign Language Film
