= Masseba (film) =

1990 Czech sci-fi film

- Directed by: Miloš Zábranský
- Starring: Karel Roden
- Release date: April 1990
- Running time: 95 minutes
- Country: Czechoslovakia
- Language: Czech

Masseba is a Czech science fiction film directed by Miloš Zábranský. It is a parable set in a post-apocalyptic world. The film was created towards the end of the communist regime, but it was not shown in cinemas until after the Velvet Revolution, which ultimately damaged the film. It was the first Czechoslovak film that used Dolby Stereo.

== Plot ==
The plot is set in a gray city of concrete and rubble, probably after a nuclear disaster. Morality has ceased to exist in society here. Killing and raping became the order of the day. The city is ruled by a violent group led by a cruel Leader. One of the members of the group is the tall young man Honza. He falls in love with the mulatto woman Svatava, which brings him into conflict with the party. The leader rapes Svatava and his group tries to eliminate Honza. However, he defeats both the leader and the men with the fans. Honza and Svatava flee the city and emerge into the shining day.

== Cast ==
- Karel Roden as Honza, the tall youth
- Václav Postránecký as the Leader
- Victoria Kidane as Svatava, the Mulatto
- Vladimír Marek as Pavel, the man with fans
- Radan Rusev as Man with a pole
- Jana Dolanská as Woman for everyone
- Miloslav Štibich as Old man

== See also ==
- List of apocalyptic films
