= National Street =

2019 Czech drama film

- Directed by: Štěpán Altrichter
- Screenplay by: Jaroslav Rudiš, Štěpán Altrichter
- Based on: Národní třída by Jaroslav Rudiš
- Produced by: Pavel Strnad
- Starring: Hynek Čermák
- Cinematography: Cristian Pirjol
- Music by: Reentko Dirks, Clemens Christian Poetzsch
- Production companies: Negativ; 42film
- Release date: 26 September 2019 (Czech Republic)
- Running time: 91 minutes
- Countries: Czech Republic; Germany
- Language: Czech
- Budget: 28,000,000 CZK

National Street (Czech title: Národní třída) is a 2019 Czech drama film starring Hynek Čermák. It is based on a book by Jaroslav Rudiš of the same name.

== Plot ==
The film is about man known as Vandam. He lives in prefab housing estate in Prague. He trains every night to be fits which earns him nickname reminiscent of Jean-Claude Van Damme. He likes barmaid Lucka who gets into trouble due to debts and Vandam decides to help her.

== Cast and characters ==
- Hynek Čermák as Vandam
- Kateřina Janečková as Lucka
- Jan Cina as Psycho
- Václav Neužil as Milner
- Jiří Langmajer as Roman
- Martin Sobotka as Séf
- Erika Stárková as Hairdresser
- Lubor Šplíchal as Mayor
- Andrej Polák as Spokesperson
- Martin Siničák as Vandam's father
- Bára Vozková as Gábina
- Terezie Vraspírová as Rich Russian girl

== Production ==
Shooting started on 27 August 2018. Production concluded in July 2019. The film was shot in Prague.
