= Vanda Hybnerová =

Czech actress

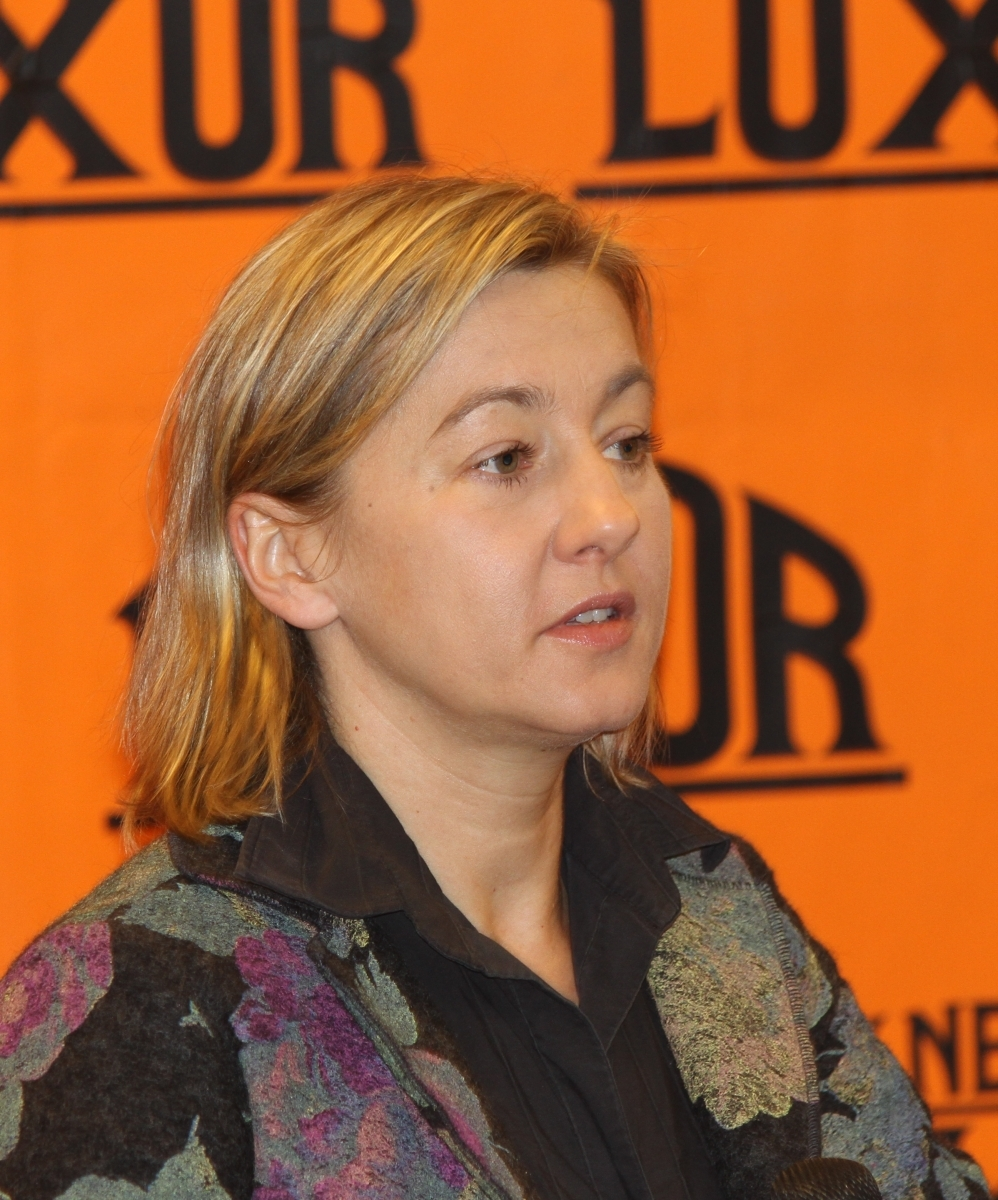
- Hybnerová in 2014
- Born: 30 September 1968 (age 56); Prague, Czechoslovakia
- Occupation: Actress
- Years active: 1989–present
- Spouse: Saša Rašilov (1993–2014)
- Children: 2
- Parent: Boris Hybner (father)
- Awards: Thalia Awards (2004)

Vanda Hybnerová (born 30 September 1968) is a Czech stage and film actress. After studying at the Faculty of Theatre in Prague, she appeared in various theatres in Prague. She was named the Best Actress in a Play at the 2004 Thalia Awards. Following her award, she has appeared in numerous television series and films.

== Career ==
Hybnerová joined the Faculty of Theatre in Prague in 1988, where she studied acting. During her studies, she performed at theatres including Semafor, Divadlo pod Palmovkou and the National Theatre.

At the 2004 Thalia Awards Hybnerová won the category of Best Actress in a Play, for her performance of the role of Catherine in a production of David Auburn's Proof (Czech: Důkaz) at the Divadlo v Řeznické in Prague. A year later, her performance in Hořké slzy Petry von Kantové earned her a nomination for Best Actress at the Alfréd Radok Awards.

Having appeared in a number of television roles on TV Nova, Hybnerová joined the cast of Ulice in 2012. She directed and acted in the play Terapie at Divadlo Palace, which premiered in Prague in October 2016.

== Personal life ==
Hybnerová was born in Prague to painter Jana Kremanová and Boris Hybner, who was also an actor. When she was six, her father left home and she was raised by her mother. She and her father appeared together in the Czech television series Přístav. In 1993, Hybnerová married Czech actor Saša Rašilov, with whom she has two daughters: Josefína and Antonia. They lived on a farm in the Bohemian-Moravian Highlands, subsequently living separately for a year before deciding to divorce in 2014.

== Filmography ==
=== Films ===
Year	Title	Role	Notes
1989	Poutníci	Functionary	
1989	Dotyky	Pavla	
1999	Kanárek	Policewoman	
2001	The Wild Bees	Jana	
2001	Mach, Šebestová a kouzelné sluchátko	Seamstress	
2005	Something Like Happiness	Zenuska	
2007	Jsem větší a lepší		Short
2008	Taková normální rodinka	Pavla	
2010	Román pro muže	Aneta	
2010	One Way Ticket		
2013	Křídla Vánoc	Ludmilka	
2015	The Little Man	Velká tíseň (voice)	
2015	Family Film	Irena	

=== Television ===
Year	Title	Role	Notes
2005–2006	Ordinace v růžové zahradě	Tereza	21 episodes
2006	Oběti: Živnostník	manzelka Libora	TV film
2006	Poslední kouzlo	princezna Hildegarda	TV film
2006–2007	Letiště	Ivana Schindlerová	18 episodes
2008	Handcuffs for Wolves		TV film
2008	Soukromé pasti	Simona	1 episode
2010	Zasažení bleskem	Doctor	TV film
2008–2010	Pojišťovna štěstí	Helena Cerná	23 episodes
2010	Dokonalý svět	Olga Krutvorová	16 episodes
2007–2010	3+1 s Miroslavem Donutilem	reportérka Sylva / dcera Anna	4 episodes
2012	Sejít z cesty	Hanka	TV film
2012	Základka	Alice Fikejzová	10 episodes
2013	Nevinné lži	Markova matka	1 episode
2013	Slečna Flintová		TV film
2013	PanMáma	Káca Beranová	16 episodes
2014	Škoda lásky	Jitka Winterová	1 episode
2014	Na druhý pohled	Jana Langová	TV film
2013–2014	Cirkus Bukowsky	Andrea	11 episodes
2015	Vraždy v kruhu	Jesika Sirotková	1 episode
2015	Doktor Martin	Eva Tejcová	1 episode
2013–2015	Ulice	Eva Touzimská	94 episodes
2015–2016	Doktoři z Počátků	Nora	7 episodes
2016	Případ pro malíře	Ing. Sestková	TV film
2015–2017	Přístav	Tereza Skálová	83 episodes
2017	Madame	Major Martina Hlavácová	1 episode
