= Ivan Pokorný =

Ivan Pokorný (born in 1952 in the Czech Republic) is an actor.

== Biography ==
He graduated in Acting from the Theatre Faculty of the Academy of Fine Arts in 1976-1983 and worked as an actor in various Czech theatres. He also had several roles in film and on television. In 1983 he emigrated to Austria, worked as a lecturer at the Vienna Conservatory and in 1984-1998 as a director in Austrian and German theatres.

In 1995 he decided to return to the Czech Republic and has been working mainly as a director of TV-films since then. He also makes documentaries and is particularly interested in themes connected with the cultural history of his country. In some projects he takes part as a producer or co-producer.

== Filmography ==
Year	Film	Note
1992	Big Arcanas of Erasmus	
1992	Ape Year	two parts
1993	Last Supper at the Bird Leg	
1994	Journey to the Sun Island	
1995	Peak of Venus	
1996	The House of the last joy	three parts
1997	Behind the Wall	
1998	The War on the Third Floor	
1999	Our Children	
1999	Ghosts among us	series
2000	Nobody had Diabetes	
2000	Black Angels/Loser	
2001	The Town without Breath	
2002	Kidnapped Home	
2002	The Death of Paedophile	
2003	Agency Puzzle	
2006	Ghetto No.1	documentary
2007	Power Relapse	
2008	Expozitur	series
2009	Kriminálka Anděl	series - 2. season
2010	The Doc for the Special Falls	
2010	Kriminálka Anděl	series – 3. season
2011	Cold Sunday	

== Awards ==
for the feature film Kidnapped Home Bonton Prize at the Zlin Festival 2002; First prize - Ostrov nad Ohří 2002 for the documentary Czech and German …
