= Matrix AB =

- Theatrical release poster
- Directed by: Vít Klusák
- Written by: Vít Klusák
- Starring: Andrej Babiš
- Release date: October 29, 2015 (Jihlava International Documentary Film Festival)
- Running time: 72 minutes
- Country: Czech Republic
- Language: Czech

Matrix AB is a 2015 Czech documentary film by Vít Klusák. It centers on Czech politician and businessman Andrej Babiš whom Klusák filmed for about one year with Babiš's permission. It shows Babiš in his private life and also during the political campaign for the 2013 legislative election. It also shows Babiš's business partners, critics and members of his party and their views of Babiš. These people include Martin Komárek, Jan Kasl and Sabina Slonková. There are also moments when Babiš forgets that he is being watched by cameras and says controversial things. The film ends with Babiš's reaction to the film where he calls it a "dirty trick".

The film also prominently features Bohumír Rada, a businessman who used to be Babiš's major business partner until he was controversially taken out from business. Rada describes Babiš's business practices and personality.

Matrix AB received the Audience Award at the Jihlava International Documentary Film Festival.
