= Tereza Ramba =

Czech actress (born 1989)

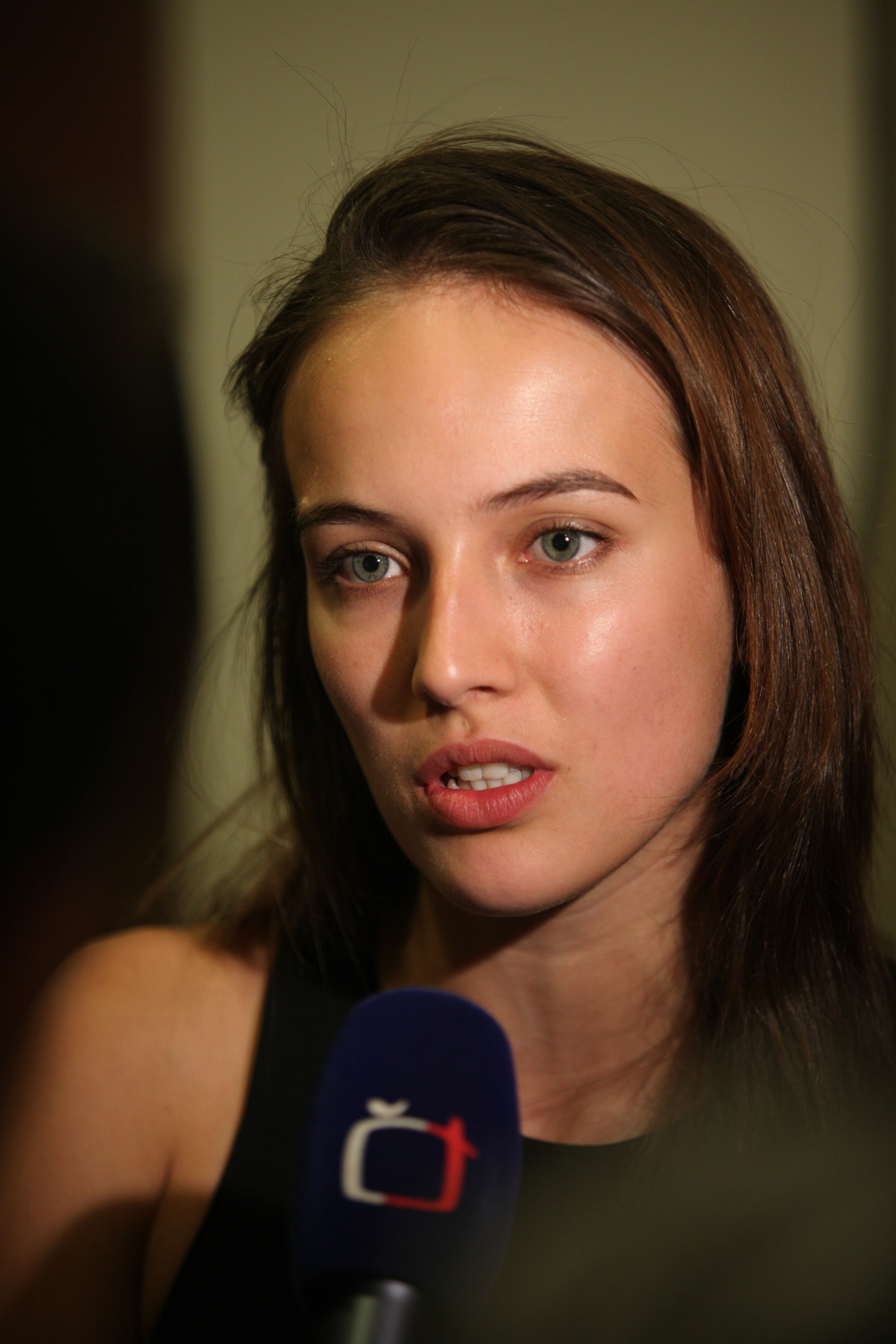
- Born: Tereza Voříšková; 29 June 1989 (age 37); Prague, Czechoslovakia
- Education: Prague Conservatory
- Occupation: Actress
- Years active: 2005–present
- Spouse: Matyáš Ramba (m. 2019)
- Children: 2

Tereza Ramba, née Voříšková (born 29 June 1989, Prague) is a Czech film and television actress. She has notably played the role of Beruška in the 2008 film The Country Teacher (Czech: Venkovský učitel). She has also played roles in Zemský ráj to na pohled, Peklo s princeznou and Bobule.

She was a student at the Prague Conservatory, majoring in music drama. She also dances professionally for Fantasy Studio.

Recipient of the 2019 Czech Lion Award in the Best Actress in a Leding Role category for the film Owners.

== Filmography ==
- 2005: Rafťáci
- 2006: Ro(c)k podvraťáků
- 2006: Místo v životě (TV series)
- 2007: The Country Teacher (Venkovský učitel)
- 2007: Trapasy (TV series)
- 2007: Svatba na bitevním poli aneb Hodiny před slávou aka The Wedding on Battle Field (International: English title)
- 2007: Překažené dostaveníčko
- 2008: Grapes
- 2008: Soukromé pasti (TV series)
- 2008: Peklo s princeznou
- 2008: Než se táta vrátí (TV series)
- 2008: Kanadská noc (TV film)
- 2008: Ďáblova lest (TV series)
- 2008: Černá sanitka (TV series)
- 2008: BrainStorm (TV film)
- 2009: Peklo s princeznou aka It is Hell with the Princess (International: English title)
- 2009: An Earthly Paradise for the Eyes
- 2009: Little Knights Tale
- 2009: 2Bobule
- 2011: Alois Nebel
- 2011: Borgia (TV series)
- 2012: Missing (US TV series)
- 2013: Rozkoš
- 2014: Všiváci
- 2015: Život je život
- 2015: Laputa
- 2015: Padesátka
- 2016: A Vote for the King of the Romans (TV film)
- 2017: Po strništi bos
- 2018: Chata na prodej
- 2020: Owners (Vlastníci)
- 2020: O vánoční hvězdě
- 2021: Deníček moderního fotra
- 2023: Docent (TV series)
- 2024: Her Drunken Diary
