= Hanna Alström =

Swedish actress

- Born: Hanna Carolina Alström; 5 March 1981 (age 45); Stockholm, Sweden
- Occupation: Actress
- Years active: 1988–present
- Partner: Gustaf Skarsgård (1999–2005)

Hanna Carolina Alström (born 5 March 1981) is a Swedish actress best known for starring in Kingsman: The Secret Service and its sequel Kingsman: The Golden Circle as Crown Princess Tilde of Sweden.

== Biography ==
Alström was born on 5 March 1981 in Stockholm, Sweden. She started acting at Unga Teatern (The Young Theatre) when she was five years old, then together with her older sister Sara, and the theatre was directed by Maggie Widstrand. The theatre group played at many theatres in Stockholm. When Alström was six, she appeared in Staffan Götestam's play Gränsland at Puckteatern and at the Gröna Lund Theatre. Later she played some child roles at the Royal Dramatic Theatre. She studied at Sankt Eriks gymnasium and later at the Swedish National Academy of Mime and Acting. In 2014 she played Crown Princess Tilde in the film Kingsman: The Secret Service, a role she reprised in its 2017 sequel Kingsman: The Golden Circle.

She appeared in Sami Blood (2016).

In 2022, she played Mohamed Al-Fayed's wife Heini Wathén in the fifth season of The Crown.

== Filmography ==
=== Film ===
- Gull-Pian (1988)
- Sherdil (1999)
- Fjorton suger (2004)
- Kärlek 3000 (2008)
- Kingsman: The Secret Service (2014)
- Sami Blood (2016)
- Kingsman: The Golden Circle (2017)
- Ted – För kärlekens skull (2018)
- The Glass Room (2019)

=== Television ===
- Bert (1994)
- Anmäld försvunnen (1995)
- Skuggornas hus (1996)
- Vita lögner (1997)
- Aspiranterna (1997)
- Skärgårdsdoktorn (1998)
- Längtans blåa blomma (1998)
- Barnen på Luna (2000)
- Nya tider (2002)
- Cleo (2002)
- Livet i Fagervik (2008)
- Blomstertid (2009)
- Crimes of Passion (2013)
- The Machinery (2020, 2022)
- The Crown (2022, 2023)
- STHLM Blackout (2024)
