= Marek Vašut =

Czech actor (born 1960)

- Vašut in 2026
- Born: 5 May 1960 (age 66); Prague, Czechoslovakia (now Czech Republic)
- Education: Lee Strasberg Theatre and Film Institute; University of California, Davis; Academy of Performing Arts in Prague
- Occupation: Actor
- Years active: 1966-present

Marek Vašut (born 5 May 1960 in Prague, Czechoslovakia) is a Czech film, stage, and television actor, best known for his appearances in Solomon Kane and Blade II. He voiced the character Tommy Angelo for the Czech version of the video game Mafia: The City of Lost Heaven. Vašut later reprised his role as Tommy in the 2020 remake Mafia: Definitive Edition. He also portrays Otto von Bergow in the single-player RPG game Kingdom Come Deliverance II.

== Education ==
Vašut had first travelled to New York City to attend the Lee Strasberg Theatre and Film Institute. Vašut also attended and the Academy of Performing Arts in Prague.

== Filmography ==
Film
Year	Title	Role	Notes
1966	Káta a krokodýl	Pepík Novák	
1967	Martin a cervené sklícko	Indián	
1973	Prijela k nám pout	Captain	
1975	Velké trápení	Vojta	
1977	Smrt mouchy	Classmate	
1979	The Divine Emma		Uncredited
1980	Lásky mezi kapkami deste	Classmate	
1981	Neco je ve vzduchu	mladý Bartonícek	
1984	Horký podzim s vuní manga	Sjöll	
1984	Láska s vuní pryskyrice	Slávek	
1985	Kariéra	Petr	
1985	Láska z pasáze	Roby	
1985	Zelená léta	Kony	
1986	Dobré svetlo	Wooer	
1987	Pesti ve tme	Vilda Jakub	
1987	Hauri	inzenýr Pavel Jaros	
1988	Stupne porazených	Stanek	
1989	Vlastne se nic nestalo	Frantisek	
1989	Príbeh '88	Muz v metru	
1989	Pražská pětka	Garbageman (Olduv vecirek)	
1989	Divoka srdce		
1990	Divoká svine	Bílek	
1991	Král kolonád	Gestapák	
1991	Vracenky		
1992	Kamarád do deste II - Príbeh z Brooklynu	Geroge	
1993	Krvavý román	kapitán Rodriquez	
1993	Chained Heat II	Stefan Lotsky	
1993	Konec básníku v Cechách		
1994	Accumulator 1	Advertising Man	
1994	Rád	Officer	
1994	Immortal Beloved	Custody policeman	
1995	Hazard	Laco	
1995	Playgirls II	Velitel komanda	
1995	Delta of Venus	Luc	
1995	Jak chutná smrt	Morton	
1996	Mission: Impossible	Drunken Male IMF Agent	
1996	Mnága - Happy End	Petr Fiala	
1998	The Brylcreem Boys	Krach	
2001	The Zookeeper	Yeltsov	
2002	Andělská tvář	Advocate Leclerc	
2002	Blade II	Golem	
2002	Únos domú	Uncle	
2002	Bad Company	Andre	
2002	XXX	Czech General	
2002	Zostane to medzi nami	Detective	
2003	Kamenák	Head physician	
2003	Frank Herbert's Children of Dune	Bashar Tyekanik	TV miniseries
2003	The League of Extraordinary Gentlemen	Soldier	
2004	Chasing Liberty	Drunk Man in Bar	
2004	Kamenák 2	Head physician	
2004	Van Helsing	Villager	
2005	Kamenák 3	Head physician	
2005	Krev zmizelého	Kongo Müller	
2005	Román pro ženy	Oliver	
2005	The Fine Art of Love	Count	
2006	Tristan & Isolde	Luther	
2006	Prachy dělaj člověka	Soudce	
2007	Hannibal Rising	Captain	
2007	La Vie en rose	Le docteur à belleville	Uncredited
2007	Bestiár	Jarmil	
2007	Chytte doktora	Hlídac parkoviste	
2008	Svatba na bitevním poli	Balabán	
2008	Bathory	Bethlen	
2008	Vy nám taky séfe!		
2009	Veni, vidi, vici	Chef	
2009	The Pagan Queen	Vrsovec	
2009	Solomon Kane	Tattoo	
2009	Abel		
2010	Kajínek	Spokesman	
2011	The Magical Duvet	Pivar	
2015	Lovci a obeti	Právník	
2016	The Visitors: Bastille Day	Thibaud	
2017	A Bag of Marbles	Patron de l'Hôtel du commerce	
2017	Miluji te modre	Manager	
2017	The Adventurers	Charlie's Security Head	
2017	Spindl	Sleazy businessman	
2018	Rolling to You	President of Sparta	Uncredited
2018	Pepa	Ucitel zemepisu	
2019	Román pro pokrocilé	Rudolf	
2019	Amnestie	Cierny	
2020	Alpha Code	Lance Ivanov	
2022	Medieval	King Wenceslas' Chamberlain	
2022	Slow Horses	Andre Chernitsky	
2024	The Agency (2024 TV series)	General Novikov	

Video games
Year	Title	Role	Notes
2002	Mafia	Tommy Angelo	Czech dub
2020	Mafia: Definitive Edition	Tommy Angelo	Czech dub
2024	Forgotten but Unbroken	Strejda	
2025	Kingdom Come: Deliverance II	Otto von Bergow	
