= A Certain Kind of Silence =

- Theatrical poster
- Directed by: Michal Hogenauer
- Written by: Michal Hogenauer; Jakub Felcman
- Starring: Eliška Křenková; Jacob Jutte; Monic Hendrickx; Roeland Fernhout
- Cinematography: Gregg Telussa
- Edited by: Michal Reich
- Music by: Filip Míšek
- Production companies: Circle Films; Negativ; Tasse Film
- Release date: 3 October 2019
- Running time: 96 Minutes
- Country: Czech Republic
- Languages: Dutch; German; English; Czech
- Budget: 20 Million CZK

A Certain Kind of Silence (Czech: Tiché doteky) is a 2019 Czech thriller film directed by Michal Hogenauer. It stars Eliška Křenková.

== Cast ==
- Eliška Křenková as Mia
- Jacob Jutte as Sebastian
- Monic Hendrickx as Mother
- Roeland Fernhout as Father
- Sigrid ten Napel as Adela
- Elisa Beuger as Lady of the Agency
- Genio de Groot as Doctor Harford
- Andris Keiss as Carl
- Matthijs Ijgosse as Thor

== Reception ==
=== Accolades ===
Year	Event	Award	Category	Recipient(s)	Result	Ref(s)
2019	Cairo International Film Festival	Bronze Pyramid	Best First or Second work of a Director	A Certain Kind of Silence	Won	
2019	Cairo International Film Festival	Golden Pyramid	Best Film	A Certain Kind of Silence	Nominated	
2020	27th Czech Lion Awards	Czech Lion Award	Best Film	A Certain Kind of Silence	Nominated	
2020	27th Czech Lion Awards	Czech Lion Award	Best Director	Michal Hogenauer	Nominated	
2020	27th Czech Lion Awards	Czech Lion Award	Best Actress in a Leading Role	Eliška Křenková	Nominated	
2020	33rd Finále Plzeň Film Festival	Golden Kingfisher	Best feature live action or animated film	A Certain Kind of Silence	Nominated	
