= Doktor od jezera hrochů =

2010 Czech comedy film

- Directed by: Zdeněk Troška
- Written by: Zdeněk Troška; Marek Kalis
- Produced by: Katerina Spurova
- Starring: Tereza Bebarová
- Cinematography: Asen Sopov
- Edited by: Dalibor Lipský
- Release date: 25 February 2010
- Country: Czech Republic
- Language: Czech

Doktor od jezera hrochů is a Czech comedy film directed by Zdeněk Troška. It was released in 2010.

== Cast and characters ==
- Tereza Bebarová as Zuzana Dobešková
- Eva Holubová as Marie Košvancová
- Jaroslav Šmíd as Dr. Čeněk Dobešek
- Jiří Langmajer as Dr. Karel Pištělák
