= The Little Man (2015 film) =

- Directed by: Radek Beran
- Screenplay by: Lumír Tuček
- Starring: Saša Rašilov
- Cinematography: Filip Sanders
- Music by: Milan Cais
- Production companies: Bedna Films; Czech Television; Fantomas Production
- Distributed by: A-Company CZ (Czech Republic); Itafilm (Slovakia)
- Release date: 30 April 2015
- Running time: 83 minutes
- Countries: Czech Republic; Slovakia
- Language: Czech
- Budget: 14 Million CZK

The Little Man (Czech: Malý pán) is a Czech-Slovak stop-motion animated film directed by Radek Beran. It is based on a book called Velká cesta malého pána (Great Journey of the Little Man).

== Plot ==
The Little Man lives in his little house in Hollow Mountain. His peaceful life ends when he has a dream of a mysterious house is to find something that he is missing. Since he himself does not feel that he is missing anything, he decides to get to the bottom of the mystery. He goes to the Empty Head to ask where to find the mysterious house. Empty Head however needs to drink sparkling waters of the lake island to give him the advice. Little Man thus sets out to journey and meets a lot of friends and helpers on his way along with enemies who want to prevent him from reaching his goal. In the end, he manages to overcome all obstacles and gets the sparkling water. Empty Head remembers the house and gives The Little Man required advice. The Little Man in the end discovers that what he was missing was right in front of his nose from the beginning.

== Voice actors ==
- Saša Rašilov as The Little Man
- Valerie Zawadská as Empty Head
- Zuzana Bydžovská as Rybabice
- Táňa Vilhelmová as Wall foot
- Vladimír Javorský as Tiny Master
- Miroslav Táborský as Promodral
- Tomáš Procházka as Captain Beefheart
- Jiří Ornest as Woodpecker
- Pavel Liška as Brazen scumbag
- Vanda Hybnerová as Great distress
- Lumír Tuček as Researchers
- Jan Vondráček as Librarian
- Klára Sedláčková as larve Fída
- Ota Jirák

== Production ==
Filming started during second half of August 2014 in the forests of Písecko.

The appearance of the puppets was created by František Antonín Skála, the group Buchty a loutky participated in the filming.

== Reception ==
The film received mostly positive reviews from critics. Kinobox lists 7 reviews with 6 of them positive and one mixed.

The film was nominated for the Czech Film Critics Award in the category of audiovisual work but didn't win the award. The film won Children's Jury Award - Beroun Bear at 2016 Trilobit Awards.

== Sequel ==
Sequel called "Big Man" (originally titled The Little Man II) is scheduled for release in 2024.

== See also ==
- 2015 in film
- Cinema of the Czech Republic
