= Jaroslav Rudiš =

Czech writer, journalist and musician (born 1972)

Jaroslav Rudiš at the Frankfurt Book Fair 2026

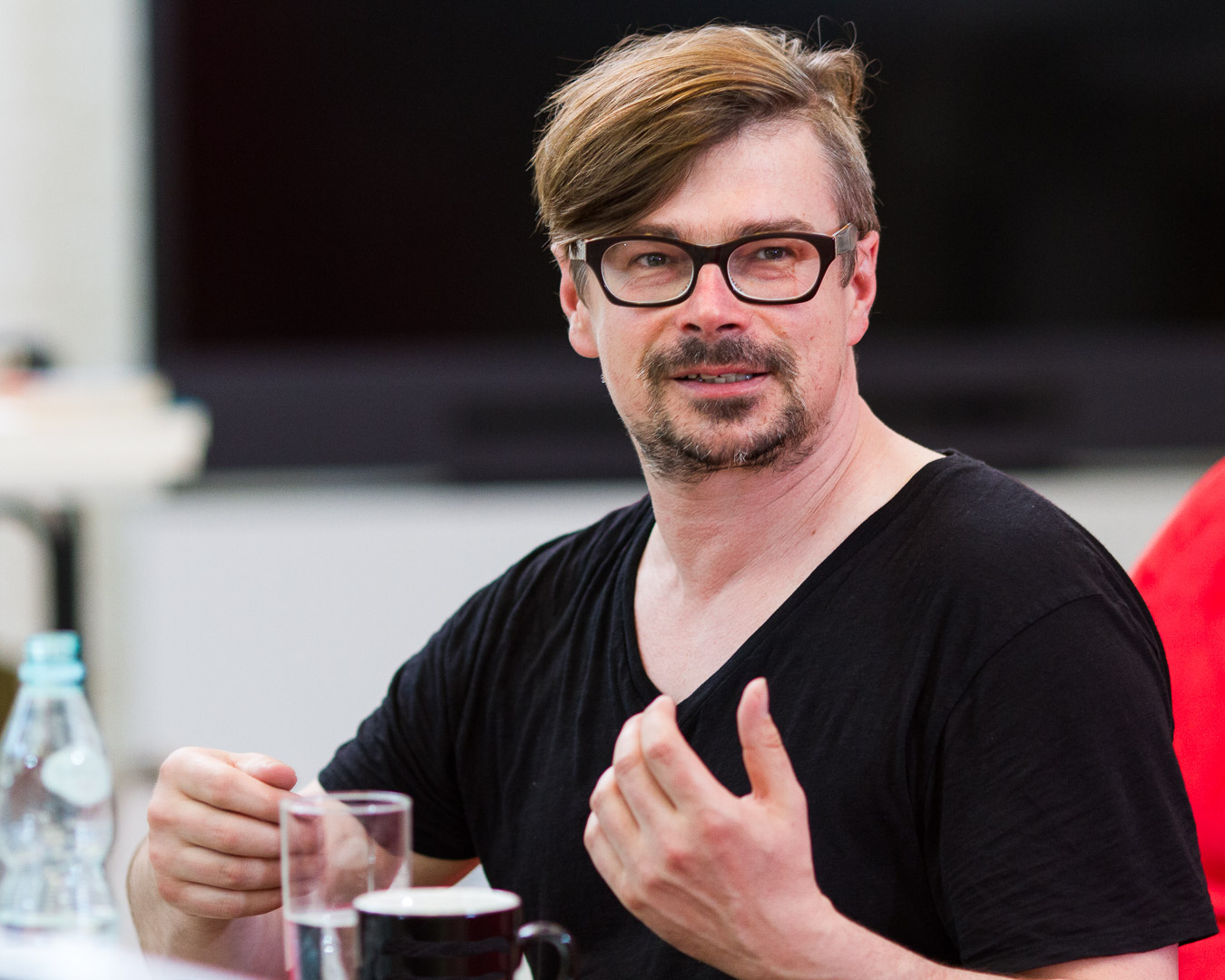
Jaroslav Rudiš (2015)

Jaroslav Rudiš (born 8 June 1972 in Turnov) is a Czech writer, journalist and musician.

Rudiš became known after publishing his first novel Nebe pod Berlínem ("The Heaven under Berlin") in 2002, the tale of a Czech teacher who chooses to leave his job and to start a new life in Berlin, where he plays music in the underground, which – along with the ghosts of suicide jumpers – gains almost mystical importance to him, and joins an indie rock group (which is a semi-autobiographical motive). It was one of the most successful Czech books of recent years. For this novel he received Jiří Orten Award.

His collaboration with draughtsman Jaromír 99 led to the publication of three closely connected graphic novels taking place among railway employees, Bílý potok ("White Brook", 2003), Hlavní nádraží ("Central Station", 2004) and Zlaté hory ("Golden Hills"). The trilogy has been adapted into an animated feature film, Alois Nebel, which was released in 2011.

== Decorations ==
Awarded by Czech Republic

- Medal of Merit (2024)

== See also ==
- List of Czech writers
