= A Vote for the King of the Romans =

- Directed by: Václav Křístek
- Starring: Kryštof Hádek, Stanislav Majer
- Country of origin: Czech Republic
- Original language: Czech

Production
- Running time: 104 Minutes
- Production company: Czech Television

Original release
- Release: 2016

A Vote for the King of the Romans (Czech: Hlas pro římského krále) is a 2016 Czech historical television film directed by Václav Křístek. It chronicles the early life of Charles IV and his relationship with his father John of Bohemia.

== Cast ==
- Kryštof Hádek as Charles IV
- Stanislav Majer as John of Bohemia
- Petr Jeništa as Bušek
- Tereza Voříšková as Blanche of Valois
- Marián Geišberg as Baldwin of Luxembourg
- Norbert Lichý as Wolfram
- Luboš Veselý as Pierre Rosiéres
- Hana Vagnerová as Elizabeth of Bohemia
- Petr Štěpán as Louis IV, Holy Roman Emperor
- Jaroslav Plesl as Dobeš z Bechyně
