= Skokan =

Skokan is a surname. Notable people with the surname include:

- Dávid Skokan (born 1988), Slovak ice hockey player
- Marcus Skokan (born 1977), Austrian footballer
