= Owners (film) =

- Directed by: Jiří Havelka
- Screenplay by: Jiří Havelka
- Starring: Tereza Voříšková, Vojtěch Kotek
- Cinematography: Martin Žiaran
- Distributed by: Cinemart
- Release date: 21 November 2019
- Running time: 97 Minutes
- Country: Czech Republic
- Language: Czech
- Budget: 10,000,000 CZK
- Box office: 40,145,044 CZK

Owners (Czech: Vlastníci) is a 2019 Czech comedy film directed by Jiří Havelka, which he made according to his own screenplay. The story is based on the play The Society of Owners (Condominium), which Havelka also wrote and directed, and was presented by the theater company Vosto5. The performance won the Divadelní noviny award in the category of alternative theater.

== Plot ==
Owners of flats in an apartment building meet at a regular house meeting to resolve the necessary sale of attic space to deal with the emergency state of the house. But the seemingly simple vote is complicated by the fact that everyone has their own ideas and agenda.

== Cast ==
- Tereza Voříšková as Mrs. Zahrádková
- Vojtěch Kotek as Mr. Zahrádka
- Dagmar Havlová as Mrs. Horváthová
- Jiří Lábus as Mr. Kubát
- Andrej Polák as Mr. Nitranský
- Pavla Tomicová as Mrs. Procházková
- Ondřej Malý as Mr. Novák
- Klára Melíšková as Mrs. Roubíčková
- David Novotný as Mr. Švec
- Kryštof Hádek as Mr. Čermák
- Stanislav Majer as Mr. Čermák
- Ladislav Trojan as Mr. Sokol

== Reception ==
Owners were nominated for 12 Czech Lion Awards including the Best film.

Year	Event	Award	Category	Recipient(s)	Result	Ref(s)
2020	9th Czech Film Critics' Awards	Czech Film Critics' Award	Best Film	Owners	Nominated	
2020	9th Czech Film Critics' Awards	Czech Film Critics' Award	Best Director	Jiří Havelka	Nominated	
2020	9th Czech Film Critics' Awards	Czech Film Critics' Award	Best Screenplay	Jiří Havelka	Won	
2020	9th Czech Film Critics' Awards	Czech Film Critics' Award	Best actress	Tereza Ramba	Won	
2020	9th Czech Film Critics' Awards	Czech Film Critics' Award	Discovery of the year		Nominated	
2020	27th Czech Lion Awards	Czech Lion Award	Best film	Owners	Nominated	
2020	27th Czech Lion Awards	Czech Lion Award	Best Director	Jiří Havelka	Nominated	
2020	27th Czech Lion Awards	Czech Lion Award	Best Actor in a Leading Role	Jiří Lábus	Nominated	
2020	27th Czech Lion Awards	Czech Lion Award	Best Actress in a Leading Role	Tereza Ramba	Won	
2020	27th Czech Lion Awards	Czech Lion Award	Best Actress in a Leading Role	Dagmar Havlová	Nominated	
2020	27th Czech Lion Awards	Czech Lion Award	Best Actor in a Supporting Role	Vojtěch Kotek	Nominated	
2020	27th Czech Lion Awards	Czech Lion Award	Best Actor in a Supporting Role	David Novotný	Nominated	
2020	27th Czech Lion Awards	Czech Lion Award	Best Actress in a Supporting Role	Klára Melíšková	Won	
2020	27th Czech Lion Awards	Czech Lion Award	Best Actress in a Supporting Role	Pavla Tomicová	Nominated	
2020	27th Czech Lion Awards	Czech Lion Award	Best Screenplay	Jiří Havelka	Won	
2020	27th Czech Lion Awards	Czech Lion Award	Best Editing	Otakar Šenovský	Nominated	
2020	27th Czech Lion Awards	Czech Lion Award	Andrea Králová	Helena Rovná	Nominated	
2020	27th Czech Lion Awards	Czech Lion Award	Best Film Poster	David Zezula	Nominated	
2020	33rd Finále Plzeň Film Festival	Golden Kingfisher	Best feature live action or animated film	Owners	TBA	
