= The Magical Duvet =

2011 film

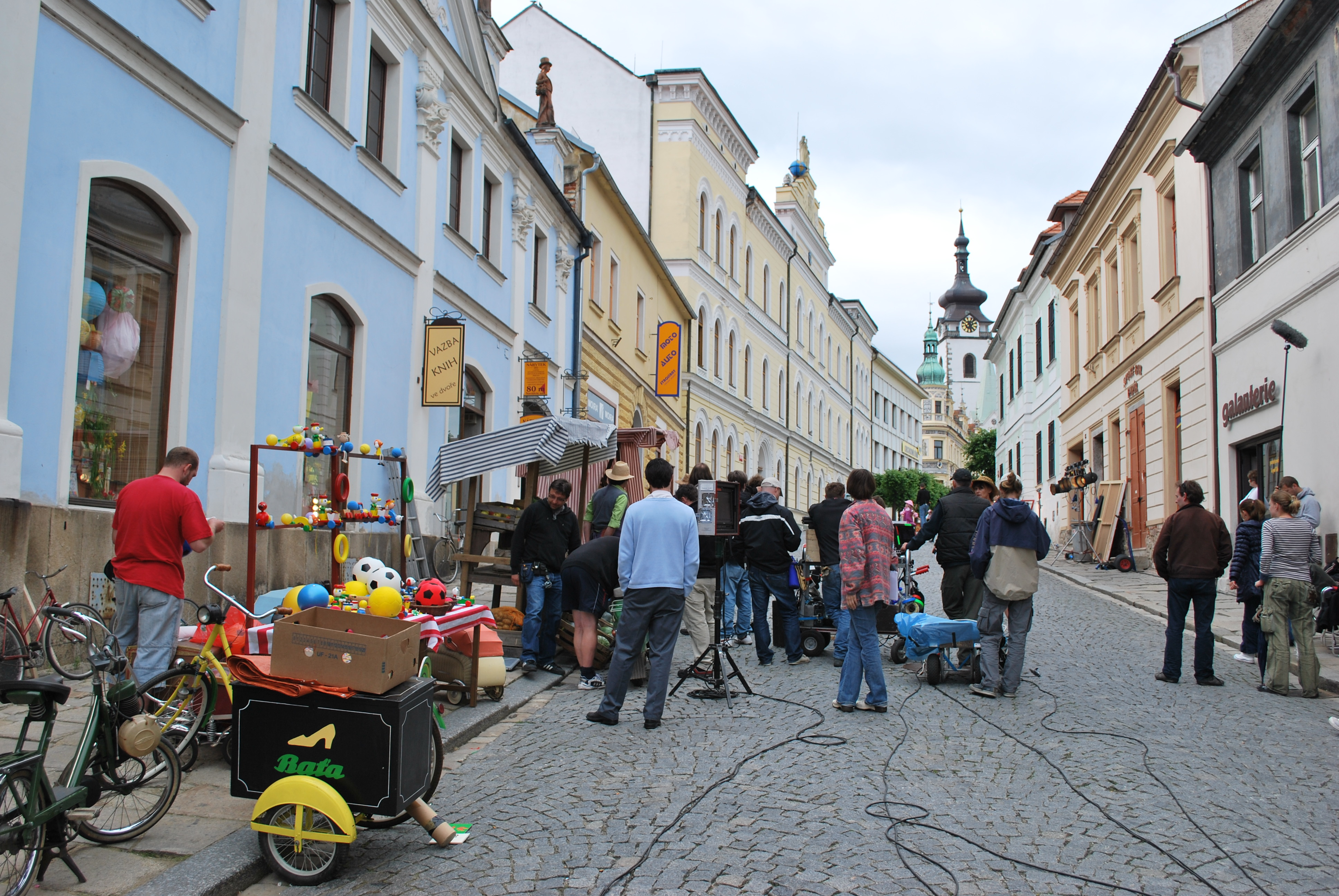
- Film-making of the film "The Magical Duvet", Písek, Czech Republic, 2010.
- Directed by: F. A. Brabec
- Written by: Miroslav Adamec
- Produced by: Igor Konyukov
- Starring: Eliška Balzerová
- Cinematography: F. A. Brabec
- Release date: 16 June 2011
- Running time: 103 minutes
- Country: Czech Republic
- Language: Czech

The Magical Duvet (Czech: V peřině) is a 2011 Czech musical film directed by F. A. Brabec. It is the first Czech non-animated 3D feature film.

== Cast ==
- Eliška Balzerová as Babička
- Karel Bělohradský as Velký chlap / Holubář
- Lucie Bílá as Maminka
- Nina Divíšková as Hilda
- Arnošt Goldflam as Policista
- Jana Krausová as Paní na hlídání
- Kryštof Michal as Metař
- Alena Mihulová as Pekařka
- Nikol Moravcová as Dívka Sen
- Jiří Mádl as Pan Karel
- Amelie Pokorná as Vendulka
- Bolek Polívka as Dědeček
- Matej Převrátil as Matěj
- Tomáš Racek as Řezník
- Karel Roden as Tatínek
