= Shotgun Justice (film) =

2019 Czech crime comedy film

- Directed by: Radek Bajgar
- Screenplay by: Radek Bajgar
- Produced by: Petr Erben
- Starring: Iva Janžurová
- Cinematography: Lukáš Hyksa
- Edited by: Jan Mattlach
- Music by: Jiří Hájek
- Production company: Česká televize
- Release date: 4 April 2019
- Running time: 95 minutes
- Country: Czech Republic
- Language: Czech
- Budget: 24,000,000 CZK
- Box office: 31,521,747 CZK

Shotgun Justice (Czech title Teroristka) is a 2019 Czech crime comedy film starring Iva Janžurová. It was directed by Radek Bajgar.

== Cast and characters ==
- Iva Janžurová as Marie
- Martin Hofmann as Mach
- Tatiana Vilhelmová as Helena
- Pavel Liška as Trpělka
- Eva Holubová as Eva Součková
- Jana Plodková as Kristina

== Reception ==
Iva Janžurová was nominated for the 2019 Czech Lion Award for Best Actress in Leading Role.
