= Vojtěch Kotek =

Czech actor and dubber

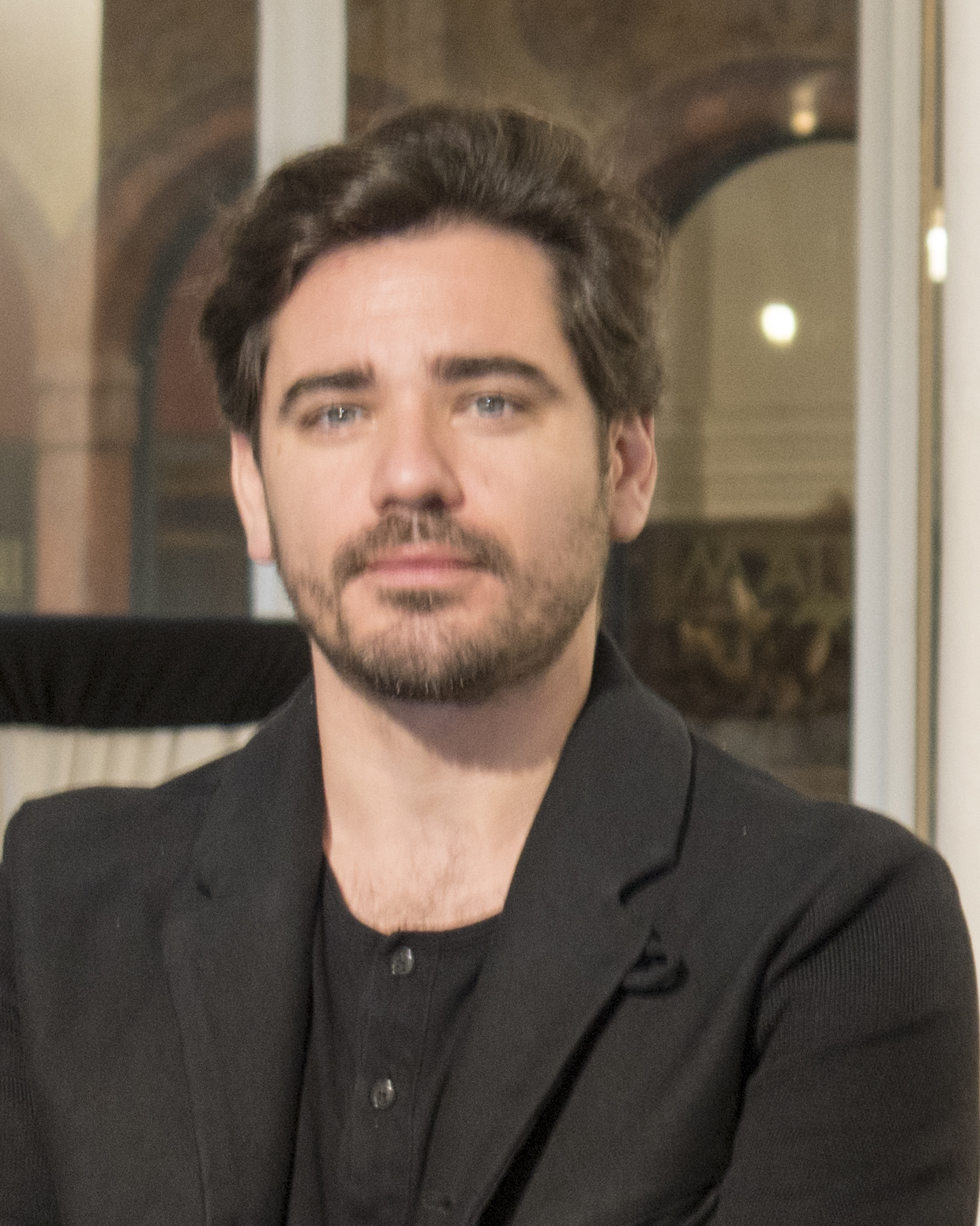
- Kotek in 2019
- Born: 8 January 1988 (age 37); Prague, Czechoslovakia
- Occupation(s): Actor, dubber
- Years active: 1996–present

Vojtěch Kotek (born 8 January 1988 in Prague) is a Czech actor and dubber.

== Selected filmography ==
=== Film ===
- Snowboarďáci (2004)
- Rafťáci (2006)
- Ro(c)k podvraťáků (2006)
- Burning Bush (2013)
- Vlastníci (2019)
- Amundsen (2019)
- Poslední aristokratka (2019)
- Bird Atlas (2021)
- Kurz manželské touhy (2021)
- Betlémské světlo (2022)
- Waves (2024)

=== Television ===
- Pojišťovna štěstí (2004)
- Labyrint (2015)
- Mordparta (2016)
- Doktor Martin (2016)
- Maria Theresia (2017)
- Einstein – Případy nesnesitelného génia (2020)
- Guru (2022)
