= On the Roof (2019 film) =

2019 Czech comedy-drama film

- Film poster
- Czech: Na střeše
- Directed by: Jiří Mádl
- Written by: Jiří Mádl
- Starring: Alois Švehlík; Duy Anh Tran; Vojtěch Dyk; David Švehlík
- Distributed by: Falcon a.s.
- Release date: 7 February 2019
- Running time: 97 minutes
- Country: Czech Republic
- Language: Czech
- Budget: 41 million CZK

On the Roof (Czech: Na střeše) is a 2019 Czech comedy-drama film. It stars Alois Švehlík who replaced Jan Tříska, who died before shooting started.

== Plot ==
Antonín Rypar is an old, cantankerous university professor who lives alone. One day he finds a Vietnamese named Song on his roof, and decides to take him in.

== Cast ==
- Alois Švehlík as professor Antonín Rypar
- Duy Anh Tran as Song, a young Vietnamese man
- Vojtěch Dyk as Marek Molnár, neighbor
- Mária Bartalos as Anna Slavenková, neighbor
- Adrian Jastraban as Kokeš, building superintendent
- David Švehlík as Martin Rypar, Antonín's son
- Radek Zima as Josef Slavíček, teacher
- Miroslav Táborský as Nouza, teacher

== Production ==
The film was shot in Prague during August and September 2018. The film was adapted from a script written by Mádl in 2011 for the New York Film Academy.
