= Amnesty (2019 film) =

2019 film

- Directed by: Jonás Karásek
- Written by: Maroš Hečko, Beata Grünmannová, Marek Janičík
- Produced by: Maroš Hečko, Peter Veverka, Nataša Ďuričova, Jiří Konečný, Ivan Juráš
- Starring: Juraj Bača
- Cinematography: Tomáš Juríček
- Edited by: Matej Beneš
- Music by: Matúš Široký, Jozef Lupták
- Production company: AZYL production
- Release dates: 31 October 2019 (Slovakia); 14 November 2019 (Czech Republic)
- Running time: 130 Minutes
- Countries: Slovakia; Czech Republic
- Language: Slovak
- Budget: 1,600,000 EUR

Amnesty (Czech: Amnestie) is a 2019 Slovak-Czech thriller film directed by Jonás Karásek. It stars Juraj Bača. It is based on Leopoldov prison uprising.

== Cast ==
- Juraj Bača as Lupko
- Natalia Germani as Lupková
- Aňa Geislerová as Kelemenová
- Marek Vašut as Čierny
- Jana Oľhová as Čierná
- Marek Majeský as Kelemen

== Script ==
- Maroš Hečko, Beata Grünmannová, Marek Janičík
