= The Last Aristocrat =

2019 Czech comedy film

- Film poster
- Czech: Poslední aristokratka
- Directed by: Jiří Vejdělek
- Written by: Jiří Vejdělek
- Starring: Hynek Čermák
- Cinematography: Vladimír Smutný
- Release date: 24 October 2019 (Czech Republic)
- Running time: 110 minutes
- Country: Czech Republic
- Language: Czech
- Box office: 67,630,895 CZK

The Last Aristocrat (Czech: Poslední aristokratka) is a 2019 Czech comedy film directed by Jiří Vejdělek. It is based on a book by Evžen Boček of the same name.

== Cast ==
- Hynek Čermák as Frank Kostka
- Tatiana Vilhelmová as Vivien
- Yvona Stolařová as Marie
- Eliška Balzerová as Paní Tichá
- Martin Pechlát as Josef
- Vojtěch Kotek as Benda
- Pavel Liška as Krása
- Zdeněk Piškula as Max
- Táňa Pauhofová as Jess
