= Jiří Langmajer =

Czech actor (born 1966)

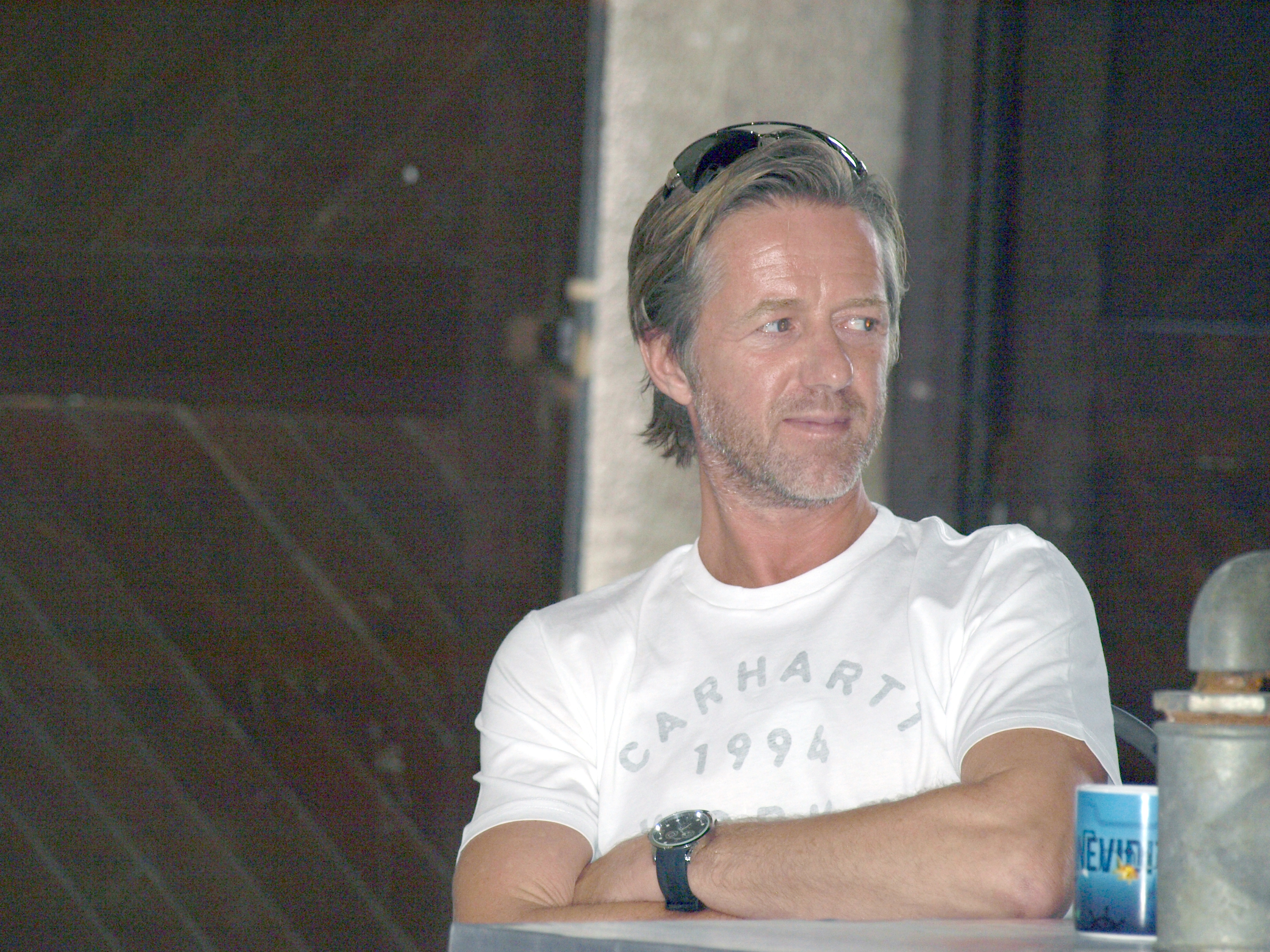
- Langmajer in 2014
- Born: 3 June 1966 (age 60); Plzeň, Czechoslovakia
- Other name: Langoš
- Education: Prague Conservatory
- Occupation: Actor
- Years active: 1983–present
- Spouse: Adéla Gondíková (m. 2019)
- Children: 2
- Relatives: Lukáš Langmajer (brother); Dalibor Gondík (brother-in-law)
- Awards: Thalia Award

Jiří Langmajer (born 3 June 1966) is a Czech theatre, television, and film actor.

== Biography ==
Jiří Langmajer was born in Plzeň, Czechoslovakia. He studied music and drama at the Prague Conservatory from 1981 to 1987. While still a student, he was cast by director Karel Smyczek in the 1987 film Why? A year later, he appeared in the miniseries Třetí patro by the same director. After graduating, he played in various theatre ensembles and in 1992, he joined Divadlo pod Palmovkou, where he remained until 2005 (with the exception of 1998–2000, when he was engaged by Vinohrady Theatre).

In 1999, Langmajer received a Thalia Award for artists under 33. In 2003, he was nominated for an Alfréd Radok Award in the Actor of the Year category. He was nominated for a Czech Lion in 1999 for his supporting role in the film The Idiot Returns and in 2006 for Pravidla lži.

He has dubbed over eighty roles and performed in hundreds of radio plays.

In July 2019, Langmajer married actress Adéla Gondíková. He has two daughters from a previous marriage.

== Selected filmography ==
=== Film ===
List of film appearances, with year, title, and role shown
Year	Title	Role	Notes
1987	Who's That Soldier?	Milan Kouba	
1987	Why?	Jirka Stupka	
1994	Thanks for Every New Morning	Honza	
1999	The Idiot Returns	Emil	
2004	Snowboarďáci	Milan	
2006	Pravidla lži	Milan	
2010	Doktor od jezera hrochů	Dr. Karel Pištělák	
2012	Líbáš jako ďábel	Láďa	
2016	Stuck with a Perfect Woman	Pavel Vomáčka	
2018	Po čem muži touží	Karel Král	
2019	National Street	Roman	

=== Television ===
List of television appearances, with year, title, and role shown
Year	Title	Role	Notes
1988	Třetí patro	Jakub Sláma	6 episodes
1993	Pomalé šípy	Thief	6 episodes
1994	Bylo nás pět	Pivoda	Miniseries – 6 episodes
1997	Četnické humoresky	Jeroným	1 episode
1997–2001	Zdivočelá země	Cassidy	20 episodes
2002	O ztracené lásce	Květoslav	5 episodes
2003	Hospital at the End of the City After Twenty Years	Engineer Verner	12 episodes
2006–09	Ordinace v růžové zahradě 1 & 2	Dr. Tomáš Hruška	208 episodes
2007	Hraběnky	Martin	6 episodes
2008–11	Soukromé pasti	Jan Faktor / Viktor	3 episodes
2010–13	Kriminálka Staré Město	Pepa / Cernin / Josef Cernín	7 episodes
2012	Základka	Dušan Myslík	10 episodes
2014	Škoda lásky	Oskar / Radek Vinkler	3 episodes
2014	Neviditelní	Ivan Lausman	13 episodes
2015–18	Labyrint	Michal Remes	21 episodes
2017	Četníci z Luhačovic	Arnošt Sova	3 episodes
2017–19	Lajna	Luboš Hrouzek	10 episodes
2018	Dukla 61	Kotas	Miniseries – 2 episodes
2021	Zločiny Velké Prahy	Rudolf Havlík	10 episodes
