= Karel, Me and You =

- Directed by: Bohdan Karásek
- Written by: Bohdan Karásek
- Starring: Jenovéfa Boková
- Cinematography: Zdeněk Eliáš
- Music by: Miroslav Faderholz
- Production company: Marienbad Film
- Release dates: 1 July 2019; (Karlovy Vary); 14 November 2019 (Czech Republic)
- Running time: 111 Minutes
- Country: Czech Republic
- Language: Czech
- Budget: 884,948 CZK

Karel, Me and You (Czech: Karel, já a ty) is a 2019 Czech comedy drama film directed by Bohdan Karásek. It stars Jenovéfa Boková, Miroslav Faderholz and Miloslav König. It premiered at 54th Karlovy Vary International Film Festival.

== Cast ==
- Jenovéfa Boková as Saša
- Miroslav Faderholz as Dušan
- Miloslav König as Karel
