= Raluca =

Raluca (pronounced [raˈluka]) is a common Romanian female given name, a Latinized diminutive of the Greek name Ralloú (Ραλλού), a rare name derived from the Ancient Greek name Hērákleia (Ἡράκλεια), meaning "glory of Hera". It may refer to:

- Raluca Băbăligea (born 1984), Romanian aerobic gymnast
- Raluca Băcăoanu (born 1989), Romanian handballer
- Raluca Haidu (born 1994), Romanian gymnast
- Raluca Ioniță (born 1976), Romanian sprint canoeist
- Raluca Izbașa, (born 1990), Romanian artistic gymnast
- Raluca Olaru (born 1989), Romanian tennis player
- Raluca Onel, (born 1982), Romanian artistic gymnast
- Raluca Presadă, (born 1978), Romanian activist and politician
- Raluca Radulescu, professor of medieval literature
- Raluca Ripan (1894–1972), Romanian chemist
- Raluca Saita (born 1979), Romanian film editor
- Raluca Sandu (born 1980), Romanian tennis player
- Raluca Sârghe (born 1987), Romanian footballer
- Raluca Sbîrcia (born 1989), Romanian épée fencer
- Raluca Șerban (born 1997), Romanian tennis player
- Raluca Strămăturaru (born 1985), Romanian luger
- Raluca Turcan (born 1976), Romanian politician
- Raluca Udroiu (born 1982), Romanian freestyle swimmer
- Ralu Caragea (1799–1870), Romanian culture personality
