= Eliška Křenková =

Czech film and television actress (born 1990)

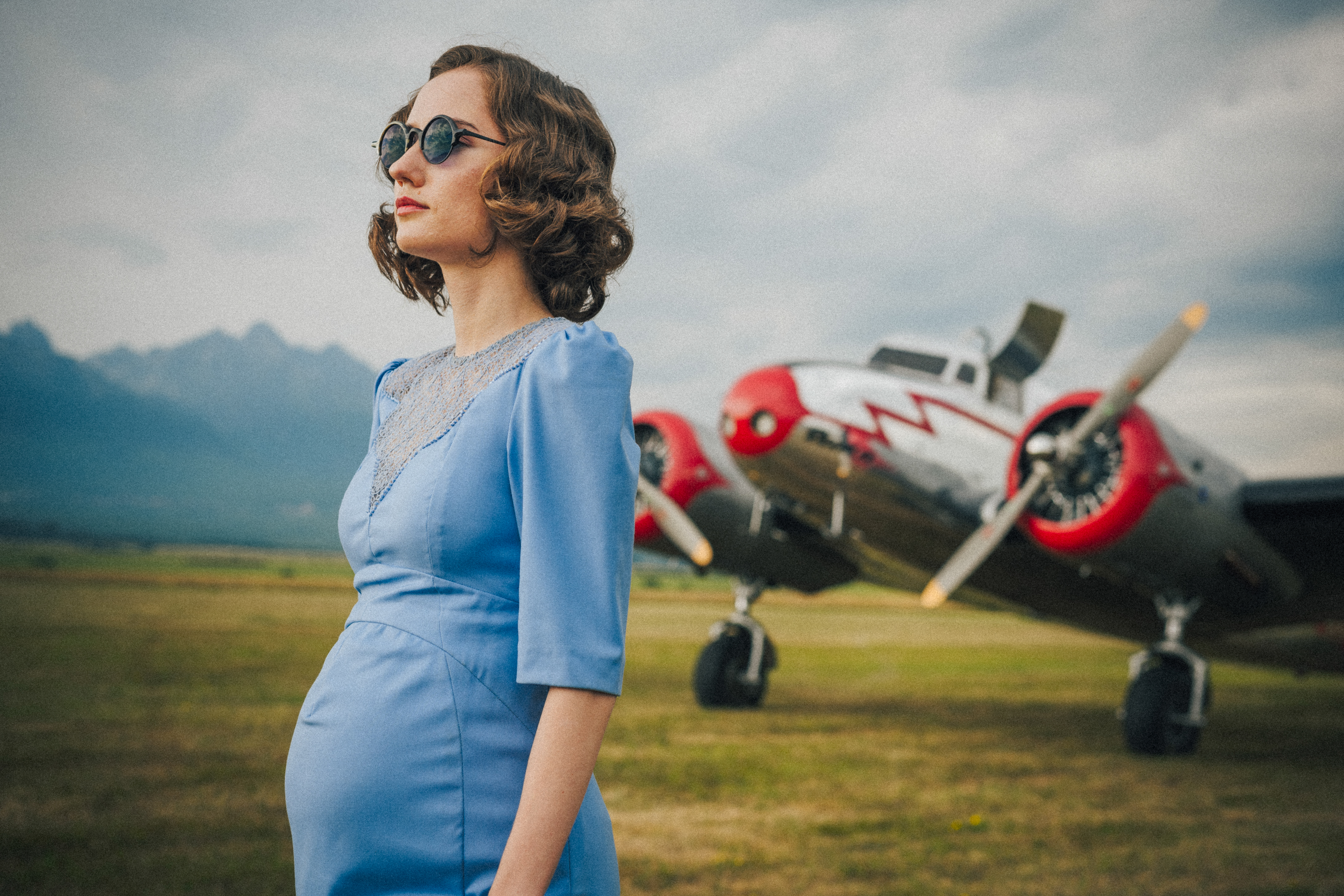
- Křenková in 2022 on the set of We Have Never Been Modern
- Born: 31 January 1990 (age 35); Prague, Czechoslovakia
- Occupation: Actress
- Years active: 2005– present

Eliška Křenková (born 31 January 1990 in Prague) is a Czech film and television actress. Křenková's film credits include Winter Flies, A Certain Kind of Silence and Princess Lost in Time. Her television credits include Wasteland, Specialisté and Sever.

== Filmography ==
Year	Title	Role	Notes
2006	Rafťáci	Vendula	
2011	Men in Hope	Bára	
2012	Probudím se včera	Zuzana	
2014	Andělé všedního dne	Ilmuth	
2014	Parádně pokecal	Lucie	
2014	Všiváci	Jana	
2015	Family Film	Kristýna	
2015	Padesátka	Ilona	
2017	Little Crusader	Angel	
2018	Winter Flies	Bára	Won Czech Lion Award for Best Supporting Actress
2019	A Certain Kind of Silence	Mia	
2020	Princezna zakletá v čase	Amélie	
2021	Atlas ptáků	Nina	
2021	Jako letní sníh	Kristýna	
2021	Marťanské lodě	Eliška	
2022	Borders of Love	Vanda	
