= The Watchmaker's Apprentice =

Watchmaker's Apprentice
- Directed by: Jitka Rudolfová
- Written by: Jitka Rudolfová
- Produced by: Pavel Berčík, Zuzana Mistríková
- Starring: Viktor Preiss, Michael Balcar, Dana Droppová
- Cinematography: Ferdinand Mazurek
- Edited by: Jakub Hejna
- Music by: Ivan Acher, Michal Novinski
- Release date: 15 April 2019
- Running time: 102 Minutes
- Country: Czech Republic
- Language: Czech
- Budget: 49,000,000 CZK

Watchmaker's Apprentice (Czech: Hodinářův učeň) is a 2019 Czech fairytale film directed by Jitka Rudolfová and starring Michael Balcar and Viktor Preiss.

== Plot ==
Three sudičky, Rodovoj, Rodovít and Lichoradka, come to Urban's cradle. Rodovoj and Rodovít wish him a happy life but Lichoradka makes a wish that Urban will become an orphan and live in poverty and unhappiness. Rodovoj and Rodovít then wish that all his difficulties will be temporary and he will ultimately live a happy life. Rodovoj and Rodovít then bet with Lichoradka whose wish will win and come true.

As Lichoradka wished, Urban's mother soon dies and Urban becomes an orphan. When he is a bit older, Rodovoj and Rodovít give Watchmaker a dream that Urban will get a treasure when he gets married. Watchmaker decides to take care of Urban as he plans to have him marry his daughter Laura and seize the treasure. Urban becomes Watchmaker's apprentice and lives with Watchmaker's family. When he grows up, Watchmaker suggests that Laura and Urban should marry. They both happily agree as they fall in love with each other and they do not know about the treasure. Lichoradka then reveals to Watchmaker that he will die when Urban and Laura get married. He then tries to call off the wedding but then finds out about a watch that can protect their bearer from death.

Watchmaker then sends Urban to find the watch, telling him that he will not allow the wedding until Urban finds the watch. Urban sets out on a journey to find the watch. While Urban is gone, Watchmaker tries to marry Laura to a rich but old neighbour; she refuses. Urban meanwhile has to overcome obstacles that Lichoradka puts in his way. With the help of Rodovít and Rodovoj, he manages to find the watch and returns to Laura who is dying of sadness. They get married but Watchmaker begins to worry that he would lose the watch and die. He then inspects the watch so that he could make new ones but they stop ticking and he dies. Urban and Laura then inherit his Watchmaker's which is revealed to be the treasure. Urban and Laura then live happily ever after. The film ends with Rodovoj, Rodovít and Lichoradka at the cradle of their newborn child.

== Cast ==
- Viktor Preiss as Watchmaker
- Jaroslav Plesl as Rodovít
- Václav Neužil as Rodovoj
- Jana Plodková as Lichoradka
- Miroslav Krobot as Innkeeper
- Michal Balcar as Urban
- Dana Droppová as Laura
