= David Novotný =

Czech actor (born 1969)

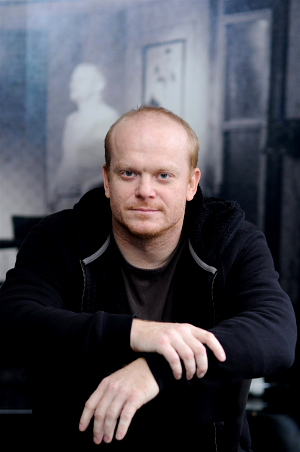
- Born: 12 June 1969 (age 56); Brandýs nad Labem, Czechoslovakia
- Occupation: Actor
- Years active: 1985-present

David Novotný (born 12 June 1969) is a Czech actor. He has appeared in more than forty films since 1985.

== Career ==
Novotný played Mr. Švec in the 2019 Czech film Vlastníci (Owners), which was only released in the US in August 2023 and was well-received by critics. Novotny was nominated for the Best Actor in a Supporting Role award in the 2019 Czech Lion Awards.

== Selected filmography ==
Year	Title	Role	Notes
2001	Dark Blue World	Bedřich Mrtvý	
2008	The Karamazovs		
2012	Sunday League – Pepik Hnatek's Final Match	Jarda Kužel	Amateur soccer player
2019	Owners	Mr. Švec	Naive man
2021–2023	Kukačky (The Swap)	Karel Holec	TV series
