= Jana Plodková =

Czech actress

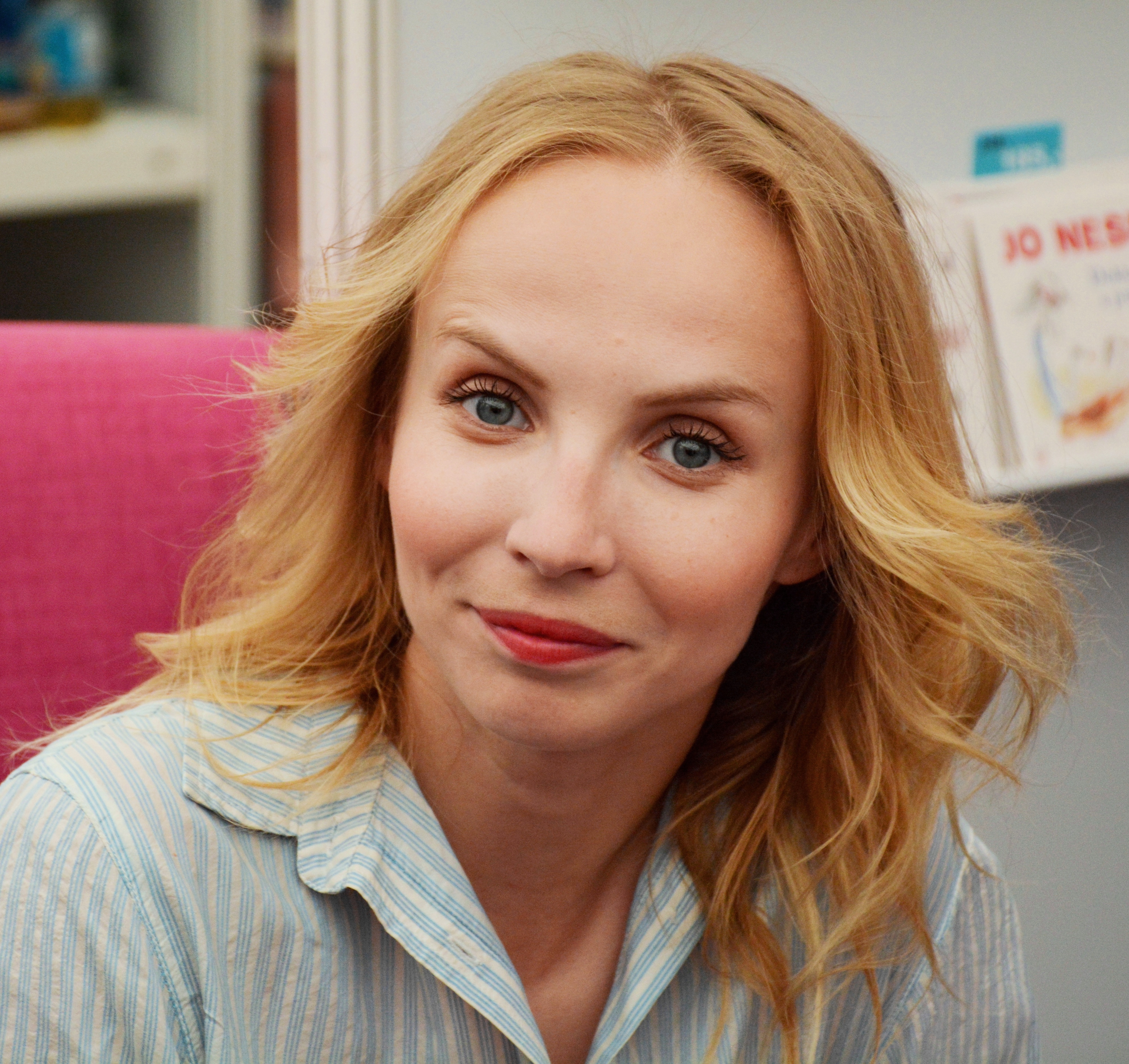
- Jana Plodková in 2015
- Born: 5 August 1981 (age 44); Jičín, Czechoslovakia
- Occupation: Actress
- Years active: 1987–present
- Partner: Filip Žilka

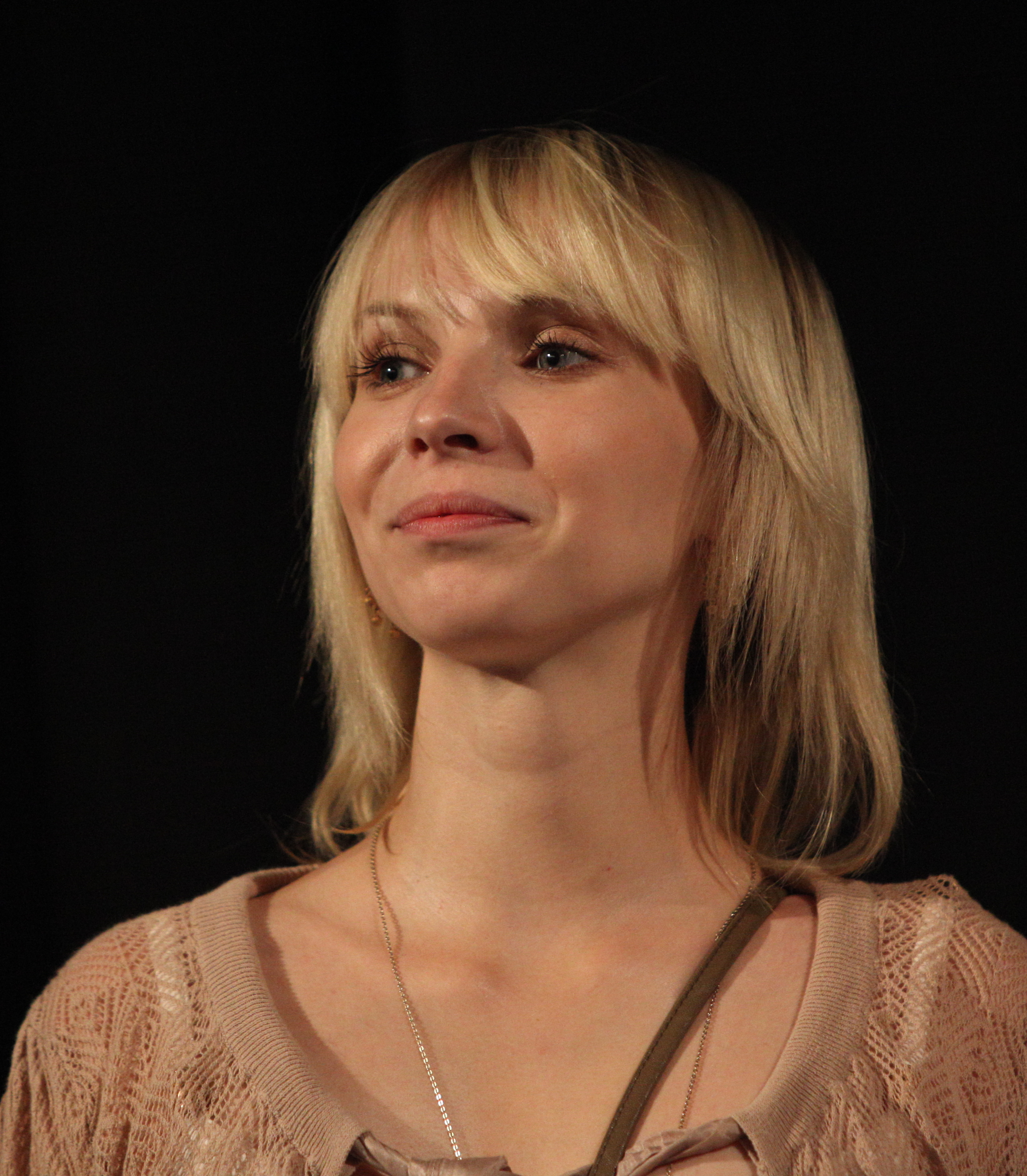
Jana Plodková in 2010

Jana Plodková (sometimes Jana Plodek; born 5 August 1981, Jičín) is a Czech actress. She studied at the Janáček Academy of Music and Performing Arts. She speaks German fluently.

== Theatre ==
=== Janáček Academy of Musical Arts ===
- Monster
- Choroby mládí

=== HaDivadlo ===
- Černá sanitka
- Doma u Hitlerů
- Ředitelská lóže
- Pařeniště
- Indián v ohrožení
- The Makropulos Affair
- Cult Fiction I
- Yvonne, princess of Burgundian
- Incident
- Renata Kalenská
- Madhouse
- Scherz, Satire, Ironie und tiefere Bedeutung
- Vycucnutí
- Sloní muž - Život a dobrodružství Josepha C. Merricka
- Silvestr 2574
- Ruská ruleta
- Odhalení
- Lulu
- The Incident
- Ignatiúv vzestup

== Filmography ==
- Příběh vánoční (2002)
- Domenica pomeriggio (2005) - Katharina
- Nejlepší je pěnivá (2005)
- Prague (2006) - Alena
- Empties (2007) - Čárkovaná
- Protektor (2009) - Hana Vrbatová
- Ocas ještěrky (2009)
- Lost in Munich (2015) - Interpreter
- The Christmas Fish (2018) (Short) - Růžena
- Hodinářův učeň (2019) - Lichoradka
- Island (2023) - Alice
- Život pro samouky (2023)
- Caravan (2025)

== Episode roles in TV series ==
- "Comeback" (16 October 2008)
- "Na stojáka" (2008)
- "Hvězdný reportér" (2008)
- "Kosmo" (2016)
