= Karel Roden =

Czech actor (born 1962)

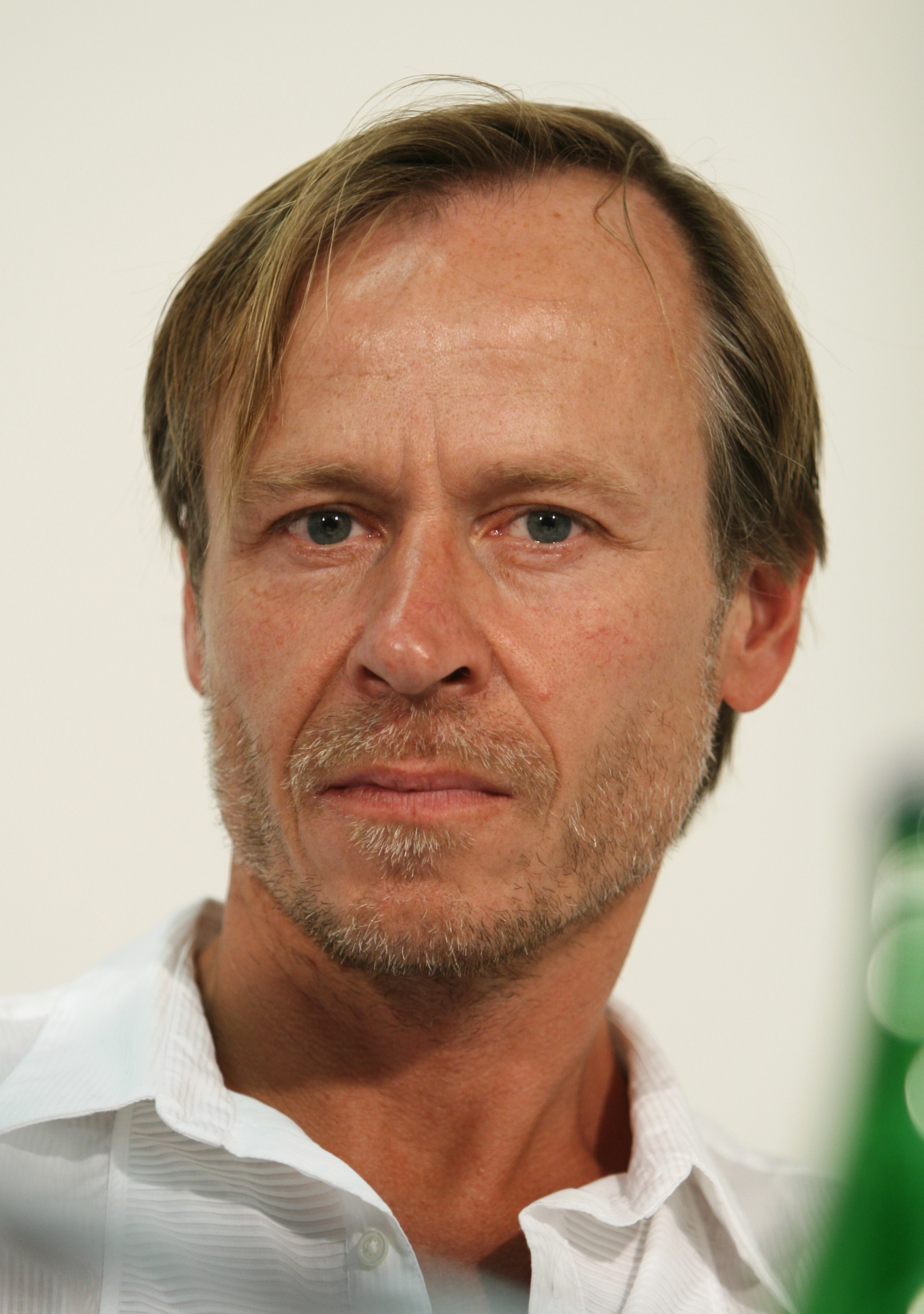
- Roden in 2008
- Born: 18 May 1962 (age 64); České Budějovice, Czechoslovakia
- Occupation: Actor
- Years active: 1982–present
- Partner: Ivana Chýlková (1985–1994)

Karel Roden (born 18 May 1962) is a Czech actor, known for his roles in Hellboy and The Bourne Supremacy, Frankenstein's Army, and his voice work in Grand Theft Auto IV.

== Life and career ==
Roden followed his father and grandfather into acting. Roden first graduated from the Comprehensive Art Secondary School for Ceramics before being admitted to the Academy of Performing Arts in Prague.

Roden's feature film career began almost simultaneous with his theatre work in 1984 as Honza, a medical student in the 2nd part of a trilogy entitled "How the poets are losing their illusions" (Jak básníci přicházejí o iluze), a lighthearted, comic look at life through the lives of young university students. Roden's Honza also appeared in the final installation of the trilogy, "How poets are enjoying their lives" (Jak básníkům chutná život).

Other comic turns include Roden's Captain Tuma in Who's That Soldier?, a humoristic look at life as a soldier in the socialist Czech army, the character Dragan in the action-thriller Dead Fish with Gary Oldman and Terence Stamp. In the comedy crime-thriller Shut Up and Shoot Me, Roden plays the hen-pecked husband hired to assassinate a grieving widow.

During the 1990s, he spent some time in London, which improved his English. He has become known for his character actor roles which began in 2001 when Roden was in the American psychological thriller, 15 Minutes, where he played the criminal Emil Slovak partnered with Oleg Taktarov opposite NYPD cop Eddie Flemming played by Robert De Niro. This was followed by a similar role, as the lawyer Carter Kounen, in the service of a vampire clan, in the movie Blade II in 2002.

This was followed by Bulletproof Monk, where he plays the Nazi megalomaniac Strucker.

His movie roles to date include 15 Minutes (2001), Blade II (2002), Bulletproof Monk (2003), The Bourne Supremacy (2004), as Grigori Rasputin in Hellboy (2004), Running Scared (2006), Largo Winch (2008), RocknRolla (2008), and Orphan (2009). He also played the Russian movie critic Emil Dachevsky in the film Mr. Bean's Holiday (2007). He played Noble Thurzo in Bathory (2008), co-production movie filmed by Slovak director Juraj Jakubisko, A Lonely Place to Die (2011) and a role as the Czech mobster Karel Benes in the TV series McMafia (2019).

For his main character in Guard No. 47, Karel Roden received the Czech Lion Award for Best Actor in Leading Role. 8 years later, he received the same award for the portrayal of Jan Masaryk in A Prominent Patient. He also received Alfréd Radok Award in 1998 for performing Bruno in Le Cocu Magnifique by Fernand Crommelynck. Other notable role was Don Juan in Grabbe's Don Juan and Faust (Divadlo v Dlouhé). He also appeared in two plays with his brother Marian. He was also a member of the Prague National Theatre. In 2019 he was at Theatre Studio DVA.

Roden has voiced Mikhail Faustin and Wade "the Fixer" Johnson in the video game Grand Theft Auto IV.

== Filmography ==
=== Film ===
Year	Film	Role
1987	Who's That Soldier?	Captain Tůma
1990	Masseba	Tall Youth
1997	Pták Ohnivák	Skeleton
1998	Traps	Dr. Marek
2000	Wild Flowers	Dead Man - Soldier
2001	15 Minutes	Emil Slovák
2002	Blade II	Karel Kounen
2003	Bulletproof Monk	Strucker
2004	The Bourne Supremacy	Yuri Gretkov
2004	Hellboy	Grigori Rasputin
2005	Dead Fish	Dragan
2005	Shut Up and Shoot Me	Pavel Zeman
2006	Running Scared	Anzor Yugorsky
2006	The Abandoned	Nikolai
2007	Mr. Bean's Holiday	Emil Duchevsky
2008	Bathory	György Thurzó
2008	Guard No. 47	Frantisek Dousa
2008	Largo Winch	Michail Korsky
2008	RocknRolla	Uri Omovich
2009	Orphan	Dr. Värava
2010	Habermann	Karel Březina
2011	Lidice	František Šíma
2011	A Lonely Place to Die	Darko
2011	Alois Nebel	The Mute
2013	Frankenstein's Army	Dr. Viktor Frankenstein
2015	Sword of Vengeance	Durant
2015	Photographer	Jan Saudek
2016	Murder in Polná	Tomáš Garrigue Masaryk
2016	A Prominent Patient	Jan Masaryk
2016	We Are Never Alone	Father
2017	Little Crusader	Bořek
2020	The Racer	Viking
2021	Večirek	Richard Crha
2022	Medieval	Wenceslaus IV of Bohemia
TBA	The Way of the Wind	Mamon

=== Television ===
Year	Title	Role	Notes
2003	Spooks	Miroslav Gradic	Episode: "Legitimate Targets"
2011–2019	Terapie	Dr. Marek Pošta	
2012	Missing	Viktor Azimoff	4 episodes
2013	The Wrong Mans	Marat Malankovic	2 episodes
2018	McMafia	Karel Benes	4 episodes
2022	A Spy Among Friends	Col. Sergei Brontov	4 episodes
2025	Rise of the Raven	Matejcik	3 episodes

=== Video games ===
Year	Title	Role
2008	Grand Theft Auto IV	Mikhail Faustin, Wade "The Fixer" Johnson
