= 2013 Czech Lion Awards =

Czech film award ceremony

21st Czech Lion Awards
- Date: February 22, 2014
- Site: Rudolfinum, Prague
- Hosted by: Marek Eben

Highlights
- Best Picture: Burning Bush
- Best Actor: Jiří Schmitzer; Like Never Before
- Best Actress: Petra Špalková; Like Never Before
- Best Supporting Actor: Jiří Lábus; Clownwise
- Best Supporting Actress: Jaroslava Pokorná; Burning Bush
- Most awards: Burning Bush (11)
- Most nominations: Burning Bush (14)

Television coverage
- Network: Česká televize
- Ratings: 693,000

2013 Czech Lion Awards ceremony was held on 22 February 2014.

== Winners and nominees ==
| Best Film | Best Director |
|---|---|
| Burning Bush – Tereza Polachová, Antony Root, Pavla Kubečková, Tomáš Hrubý; Like Never Before – Ondřej Trojan; Clownwise – Viktor Tauš, Michal Kollár; Revival – Rudolf Biermann; Delight – Viktor Schwarcz | Burning Bush – Agnieszka Holland; Like Never Before – Zdeněk Tyc; Honeymoon – Jan Hřebejk; Revival – Alice Nellis; Delight – Jitka Rudolfová |
| Best Actor in a Leading Role | Best Actress in a Leading Role |
| Like Never Before – Jiří Schmitzer; Burning Bush – Petr Stach; Clownwise – Oldřich Kaiser; Revival – Marián Geišberg; Revival – Miroslav Krobot | Like Never Before – Petra Špalková; Burning Bush – Tatiana Pauhofová; Honeymoon – Anna Geislerová; Revival – Zuzana Bydžovská; Delight – Jana Plodková |
| Best Actor in a Supporting Role | Best Actress in a Supporting Role |
| Clownwise – Jiří Lábus; Burning Bush – Ivan Trojan; Wings of Christmas – David Novotný; Honeymoon – Jiří Černý; Delight – Jaroslav Plesl | Burning Bush – Jaroslava Pokorná; Colette – Zuzana Mauréry; Like Never Before – Taťjána Medvecká; Clownwise – Kati Outinen; Revival – Jenovéfa Boková |
| Best Screenplay | Best Editing |
| Burning Bush – Štěpán Hulík; Like Never Before – Markéta Bidlasová; Clownwise – Petr Jarchovský; Revival – Alice Nellis; Delight – Jitka Rudolfová | Burning Bush – Pavel Hrdlička; Like Never Before – Vladimír Barák; Wings of Christmas – Alois Fišárek; Revival – Filip Issa; Delight – Jakub Hejna |
| Best Cinematography | Stage Design |
| Burning Bush – Martin Štrba; Colette – Marek Jícha; Like Never Before – Patrik Hoznauer; Honeymoon – Martin Štrba; Delight – Ferdinand Mazurek | Burning Bush – Milan Býček; Colette – Václav Novák; Like Never Before – Adam Pitra; Clownwise – Jan Kadlec; Delight – Jan Novotný |
| Makeup and Hairstyling | Costume Design |
| Burning Bush – Zdeněk Klika; Colette – Jaroslav Šámal, Lukáš Král; Like Never Before – Jana Bílková; Clownwise – René Stejskal; Delight – Jana Bílková | Burning Bush – Katarína Hollá; Cyril and Methodius - The Apostles of the Slavs - Apoštolové Slovanů – Mariana Stránská; Like Never Before – Andrea Králová; Revival – Katarína Hollá; Delight – Marek Cpin |
| Music | Sound |
| Burning Bush – Antoni Komasa-Lazarkiewicz; Clownwise – Petr Ostrouchov; Wings of Christmas – Richard Krajčo; Honeymoon – Aleš Březina; Revival – Jan Ponocný | Burning Bush – Petr Čechák, Marek Hart; The Don Juans – Radim Hladík mladší; Like Never Before – Jan Čeněk; Revival – Viktor Ekrt, Matthew Gough; Delight – Richard Müller |
| Unique Contribution to Czech Film | Best Documentary |
| Vladimír Körner | Crooks – Silvie Dymáková |

=== Non-statutory Awards ===
- Best Film Poster
  - Burning Bush
- Film Fans Award
  - Fair Play
- Magnesie Award for Best Student Film
  - The Little Cousteau
