= Eva Borušovičová =

Slovak screenwriter (1970–2025)

- Born: 5 January 1970; Levice, Czechoslovakia
- Died: 2 June 2025 (aged 55); Bratislava, Slovakia
- Other name: Maxim E. Matkin
- Education: Academy of Performing Arts in Bratislava
- Occupations: Writer, screenwriter, director
- Spouse: Norbert Moravanský
- Children: 3
- Relatives: Soňa Borušovičová-Karvayová (sister)

Eva Borušovičová (5 January 1970 – 2 June 2025) was a Slovak writer, film director and screenwriter. She was also known as a writer under her own name as well as under the pseudonym Maxim E. Matkin.

== Early life and education ==
Eva Borušovičová was born in Levice, Czechoslovakia, on 5 January 1970.

Borušovičová studied dramaturgy and directing at the Academy of Performing Arts in Bratislava, graduating in 1988.

== Career ==
While still a student, Borušovičová worked as a dramaturge for the public broadcaster Radio and Television of Slovakia, notably being involved with the popular children's show Od Kuka do Kuka.

She directed three movies: Blue Heaven (1997), Amálka, ja sa zbláznim! (1999) and Love me if you Dare (2001). She wrote the script for the 2009 movie Janosik: A True Story, directed by Agnieszka Holland and Kasia Adamik. She also wrote screenplays for theatre plays.

Borušovičová was one of the earliest Internet personalities in Slovakia. She became known for publishing short stories discussing the life experience of millennials on the inZine website in the early 2000s. The stories were published under her own name and under the name Maxim E. Matkin, widely considered a pseudonym of Borušovičová.

== Personal life and death ==
Borušovičová resided in Bratislava, together with her husband, the physician, Norbert Moravanský, and their three children. She died of uveal melanoma on 2 June 2025, at the age of 55.

Her younger sister, Soňa Borušovičová-Karvayová, is a screenwriter.
