= 48th Karlovy Vary International Film Festival =

2013 film festival edition

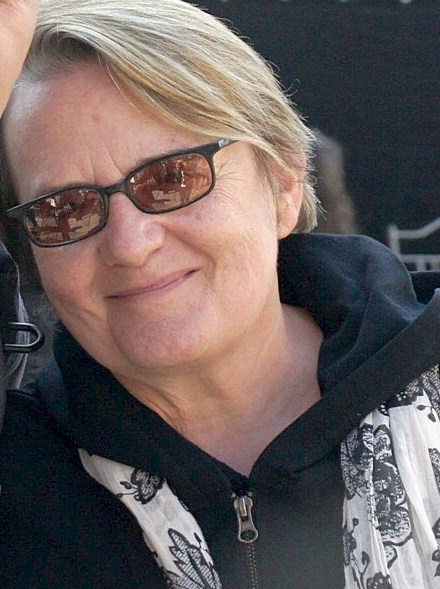
Agnieszka Holland, Grand Jury President

The 48th Karlovy Vary International Film Festival took place from 28 June to 6 July 2013. The Crystal Globe was won by The Notebook, a Hungarian drama film directed by János Szász. The second prize, the Special Jury Prize was won by A Field in England, a British historical psychological horror film directed by Ben Wheatley. Polish film and television director and screenwriter Agnieszka Holland was the Grand Jury President of the festival.

== Juries ==
The following people formed the juries of the festival:

Main competition

- Agnieszka Holland, Grand Jury President (Poland)
- Ivo Andrle (Czech Republic)
- Frédéric Boyer (France)
- Alon Garbuz (Israel)
- Claudia Llosa (Peru)
- Meenakshi Shedde (India)
- Sigurjón Sighvatsson (Iceland)

Documentaries

- Krzysztof Gierat, Chairman (Poland)
- Maria Bonsanti (Italy)
- Martin Mareček (Czech Republic)
- Sergio Oksman (Spain)
- Andrea Reuter (Sweden)

East of the West

- Éva Vezér, Chairwoman (Hungary)
- Peter Paul Huth (Germany)
- Maja Miloš (Serbia)
- Piotr Mularuk (Poland)
- Sergej Stanojkovski (Germany)

== Official selection awards ==
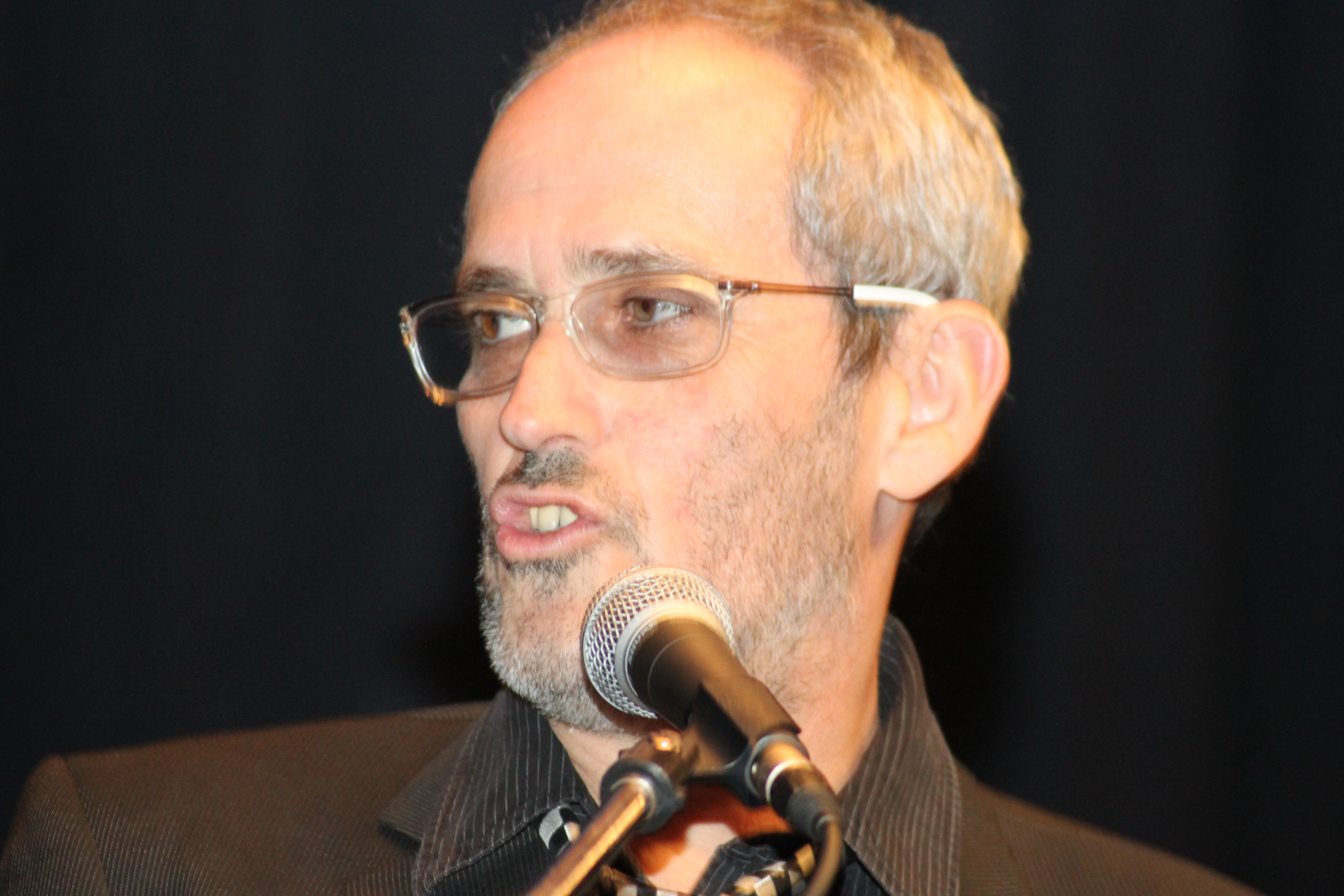
János Szász, director of The Notebook

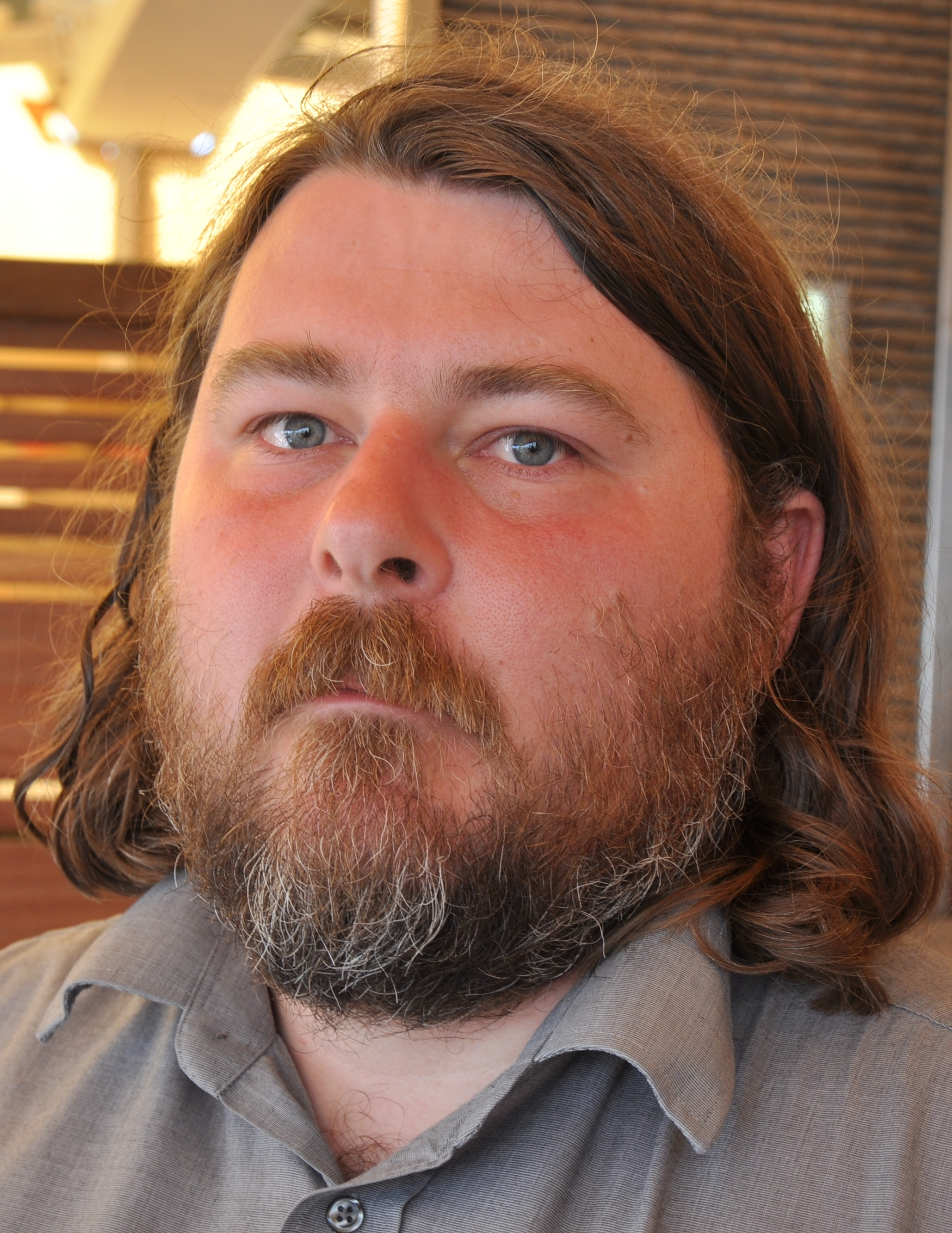
Ben Wheatley, director of A Field in England

The following feature films and people received the official selection awards:

- Crystal Globe (Grand Prix) - The Notebook (A nagy füzet) by János Szász (Hungary, Germany, Austria, France)
- Special Jury Prize - A Field in England by Ben Wheatley (United Kingdom)
- Best Director Award - Jan Hřebejk for Honeymoon (Líbánky) (Czech Republic, Slovak Republic)
- Best Actress Award (ex aequo) - Amy Morton, Louisa Krause, Emily Meade, and Margo Martindale for their roles in Bluebird (USA, Sweden)
- Best Actor Award - Ólafur Darri Ólafsson for his role in XL (Iceland)
- Special mention of the jury - Papusza by Joanna Kos-Krauze & Krzysztof Krauze (Poland)

== Other statutory awards ==
Other statutory awards that were conferred at the festival:

- Best documentary film (over 30 min) - Pipeline (Truba) by Vitaly Manskiy (Russia, Germany, Czech Republic)
  - Special Mention - The Manor by Shawney Cohen (Canada)
- Best documentary film (under 30 min) - Beach Boy by Emil Langballe (United Kingdom)
- East of the West Award - Floating Skyscrapers (Płynące wieżowce) by Tomasz Wasilewski (Poland)
  - Special Mention - Miracle (Zázrak) by Juraj Lehotský (Slovak Republic, Czech Republic)
- Crystal Globe for Outstanding Artistic Contribution to World Cinema - Theodor Pištěk (Czech Republic), Oliver Stone (USA), John Travolta (USA)
- Festival President's Award - Vojtěch Jasný (Czech Republic)
- Audience Award - Revival by Alice Nellis (Czech Republic)

== Non-statutory awards ==
The following non-statutory awards were conferred at the festival:

- FIPRESCI International Critics Award: Shame (Styd) by Yusup Razykov (Russia)
- Ecumenical Jury Award: Bluebird by Lance Edmands (USA, Sweden)
- FEDEORA Award (East of the West section): Velvet Terrorists (Zamatoví teroristi) by Ivan Ostrochovský, Pavol Pekarčík, Peter Kerekes (Slovak Republic, Czech Republic, Croatia)
- Europa Cinemas Label: The Notebook (A nagy füzet) by János Szász (Hungary, Germany, Austria, France)
