= Shame (disambiguation) =

Shame is a psychological condition.

Shame or Ashamed may also refer to:

== Arts, entertainment, and media ==
=== Films ===
==== Ashamed ====
- Ashamed (1950 film), a 1950 Iranian drama film directed by Esmail Kushan
- Ashamed (2010 film), a 2010 Korean queer film directed by Kim Soo-hyeon

==== Shame ====
- Shame (1917 film), a 1917 American drama film directed by John W. Noble
- Shame (1921 film), a 1921 American silent film directed by Emmett J. Flynn
- Shame (1922 film), a 1922 German silent drama film
- Shame, reissued title of the 1962 American film The Intruder directed by Roger Corman
- Shame (1968 film), a 1968 drama Swedish film directed by Ingmar Bergman
- Shame (1988 film), a 1988 Australian film directed by Steve Jodrell
- Shame (2011 film), a 2011 drama British-American film directed by Steve McQueen
- Shame (2013 film), a 2013 Russian-language film about the Kursk Russian submarine disaster

=== Television ===
- Skam (TV series) (En: Shame), a 2015 Norwegian drama series created by Julie Andem
- Shame (TV series), an American remake of the Norwegian series above
- "Shame" (Malcolm in the Middle), a 2000 episode of the American sitcom series Malcolm in the Middle
- "Shame", a 2011 episode of Prime Suspect

=== Literature ===
- Shame (Alvtegen novel), a 2005 novel by Karin Alvtegen
- Shame (Rushdie novel), a 1983 novel by Salman Rushdie
- Lajja (novel) (En: Shame), a 1993 novel in Bengali by Taslima Nasrin

=== Music ===
- Shame (band), a British post-punk band

==== Albums and EPs ====
- Shame (Brad album), 1993
- Shame (EP), a 2012 EP by Freddie Gibbs and Madlib
- Shame (Trash Talk album), 2009
- Shame (Uniform album), 2020

==== Songs ====
- "Shame" (Drowning Pool song), 2009
- "Shame" (Eurythmics song), 1987
- "Shame" (Evelyn "Champagne" King song), 1978
- "Shame" (Monrose song), 2006
- "Shame" (The Motels song), 1985
- "Shame" (Orchestral Manoeuvres in the Dark song), 1987
- "Shame" (Stabbing Westward song), 1996
- "Shame" (Tyrese song), 2015
- "Shame" (Keith Urban song), 2013
- "Shame" (Robbie Williams and Gary Barlow song), 2010
- "Shame", a song by Adam Lambert from The Original High, 2015
- "Shame", a song by Betty Boo from Boomania, 1990
- "Shame", a song by Depeche Mode from Construction Time Again, 1983
- "Shame", a song by Bill Fay for 1,000 Days, 1,000 Songs, 2017
- "Shame", a song by the Gigolo Aunts from Flippin' Out, 1993
- "Shame", a song by Lauren Mayberry from Vicious Creature, 2024
- "Shame", a song by Matchbox 20 from Yourself or Someone Like You, 1996
- "Shame", a song by Mitski from Retired from Sad, New Career in Business, 2013
- "Shame", a song by Peakboy from Portrait, 2018
- "Shame", a song by PJ Harvey from Uh Huh Her, 2004
- "Shame", a song by Randy Newman from Bad Love, 1999
- "Shame", a song by Seam from Headsparks, 1992
- "Shame", a song by the Smashing Pumpkins from Adore, 1998
- "Shame", a song by Stabbing Westward from Wither Blister Burn & Peel, 1996
- "Shame", a song by Underoath from The Place After This One, 2025
- "Shame", a song by Warkings from Morgana, 2022
- "Shame", a song by the Young Fathers from White Men Are Black Men Too, 2015
- "Shame Shame", a song by the Magic Lanterns, 1968
- "Shame, Shame, Shame" (Shirley & Company song), 1974
- "The Shame", a song by Dramatis, 1982
- "The Shame", a song by Levellers from We the Collective, 2018
- "Shame", a song by System of a Down featuring Wu-Tang Clan, 2006
- "Shame Shame", a song by Foo Fighters, 2021

=== Other uses in arts, entertainment, and media ===
- Shame, an enemy of Batman's

== See also ==
- Shame, Shame, Shame (disambiguation)
- Shames (disambiguation)
- Shameless (disambiguation)
