= Prime Minister (TV series) =

- DVD case of the first two episodes of the series.
- Created by: Agnieszka Holland; Magdalena Łazarkiewicz; Katarzyna Adamik
- Starring: Janusz Gajos; Andrzej Seweryn; Marcin Perchuć; Krzysztof Stroiński; Katarzyna Herman
- Country of origin: Poland
- No. of seasons: 1
- No. of episodes: 14

Production
- Running time: 55 minutes (approximate)

Original release
- Network: Polsat
- Release: 13 September – 6 December 2007

Ekipa (lit. 'team', English title: Prime Minister) is a Polish political drama TV series created and directed by Agnieszka Holland, aired from 13 September 2007 until 6 December 2007 (cancelled due to low audience figures) on Polsat. Ekipa is the second Polish political fiction series after the 1980s miniseries The Career of Nicodemus Dyzma based on Tadeusz Dołęga-Mostowicz's novel of the same name.

== Creators ==
The series is directed by three directors - Agnieszka Holland, Magdalena Łazarkiewicz and Katarzyna Adamik, and produced by ATM Grupa and Grupa Filmowa. Copyrights are owned by Telewizja Polsat. The script was created by Dominik Wieczorkowski-Rettinger and Wawrzyniec Smoczyński.

== Plot ==
The action of the series is set in present-day Poland. The story begins when Prime Minister and legendary opposition leader during Communist rule Henryk Nowasz of "Polish Centre Bloc" (Polski Blok Centrum) was suspected of being an agent of the former communist security services. Nowasz decided to resign in order to prevent a government downfall and proposed non-partisan 37-year-old Professor of Economy and Political Sciences Konstanty Turski, his friend and an unofficial advisor, to become a caretaker until he could prove his innocence. Turski was narrowly confirmed by the Sejm, with silent opposition of the coalition party, "Right-wing for Poland" (Prawica dla Polski), whose leader, Jan Matajewicz, soon became his archenemy, with support of his party colleague, President Juliusz Szczęsny and both far-right and left-wing opposition parties. Turski, however, soon proved to be an effective (but idealistic and unconventional) leader, but his administration is involved with serious odds with other politicians. The key ally of Matajewicz is deputy Sejm Marshal Krystyna Sochaczewska, a longtime Nowasz's friend from opposition and his successor as party leader.

== Characters ==
- Henryk Nowasz (Janusz Gajos), former Prime Minister and PBC leader
- Konstanty Turski (Marcin Perchuć), Prime Minister
- Julian Szczęsny (Andrzej Seweryn), President
- Jan Matajewicz (Marek Frąckowiak), acting Sejm Marshal, PDP leader, briefly Acting President after Szczęsny's death
- Krystyna Sochaczewska (Bogusława Schubert), PBC leader and Sejm Marshal
- Adam Niemiec (Krzysztof Stroiński), chief of the Prime Minister's chancellery
- Aleksandra Pyszny (Katarzyna Herman), chief of the Prime Minister's political cabinet
- Hubert Kowerski (Rafał Maćkowiak), spokesman of the government
- Julia Rychter (Katarzyna Gniewkowska), Chief of the Prime Minister's economic advisory team
- Dorota (Agnieszka Grochowska), Niemiec's assistant
- Mateusz Bonowicz (Marcin Bosak), Prime Minister's assistant
- Dr Jan Guss (Marek Kalita), Prime Minister's economic advisor
- Boczek (first name unknown) (Ryszard Kotys), Deputy Prime Minister
- Naruszewski (first name unknown) (Maciej Banach), Leader of the far-right
- Paulina Turska (Aleksandra Justa), Turski's wife
- Marta Kołodziejczyk (Ewa Kutynia), journalist, Kowerski's former wife
- Patrycja (Barbara Kurzaj), Prime Minister's secretary

== Real-life inspiration ==
Fictional politicians in Ekipa are often said to be a "TV alternative" for the National Conservative administration of the Law and Justice. Series creators also mention The West Wing as a model.

However, there are some significant similarities to other U.S. political drama - Commander in Chief. Like Mackenzie Allen, Turski became a leader very accidentally. Also his chief opponent is Sejm Marshal, which could remind one of odds between Allen and Speaker of the House Nathan Templeton. Third of all: Turski preserved all cabinet of his predecessor just as Allen did, despite lack of loyalty from number of ministers.

Nowasz's PBC is said to be based on former Freedom Union, while Matajewicz's PDP on Law and Justice.

== Political parties in Ekipa ==
Sejm political parties in Ekipa:

- Polish Centist Party (Polski Blok Centrowy) - largest party in parliament, ruling in coalition with PDP. Centrist political positions. PBC composing people's with both left (i.e. Niemiec) and right-wing leaning (Nowasz, Sochaczewska). Has 184 Sejm seats (40%)
- Right for Poland (Prawica Dla Polski) - national-conservative, second largest in Sejm. Headed by Matajewicz. President is also a former PDP leader and its founder. 92 seats (20%)
- United Left (Zjednoczona Lewica) - ruling party during previous term. Modeled on real-life SLD or LiD. Social democratic. 74 seats (16%)
- Patriotic Convent (Konwent Patriotyczny) - far-right wing. Modeled on real-life League of Polish Families. Hard-core anti-European Union. 64 seats (14%)
- Agrarians - modeled on real-life Polish People's Party. 43 seats (9.5%). Smallest Sejm party
