= Spoor (film) =

2017 Polish film by Agnieszka Holland

- Film poster
- Directed by: Agnieszka Holland
- Written by: Olga Tokarczuk; Agnieszka Holland
- Based on: Drive Your Plow Over the Bones of the Dead by Olga Tokarczuk
- Produced by: Janusz Wachala; Krzysztof Zanussi
- Starring: Agnieszka Mandat; Wiktor Zborowski; Miroslav Krobot; Jakub Gierszał; Patrycja Volny; Tomasz Kot; Borys Szyc
- Cinematography: Jolanta Dylewska; Rafał Paradowski
- Edited by: Pavel Hrdlicka
- Music by: Antoni Łazarkiewicz
- Release dates: 12 February 2017 (Berlin); 24 February 2017 (Poland)
- Running time: 128 minutes
- Countries: Poland; Czech Republic; Germany
- Language: Polish
- Box office: $1 million

Spoor (Polish: Pokot) is a 2017 Polish crime film directed by Agnieszka Holland, adapted from the novel Drive Your Plow Over the Bones of the Dead by Olga Tokarczuk. It was selected to compete for the Golden Bear in the main competition section of the 67th Berlin International Film Festival. At Berlin, the film won the Alfred Bauer Prize (Silver Bear). It was selected as the Polish entry for the Best Foreign Language Film at the 90th Academy Awards, but it was not nominated.

The Polish-language title, Pokot, is a hunting term that refers to the count of wild animals killed. The English title Spoor refers to the traces and tracks left behind by the hunted game.

== Plot ==
The film is set in a remote mountainous region of the Kłodzko Valley in south-western Poland, where an eccentric elderly woman, Janina Duszejko, lives with her two dogs. Her dogs disappear one day while she is giving a local woman, nicknamed Dobra Nowina, a ride to the store. She confronts her neighbour who she calls "Big Foot", a notorious poacher in whose traps animals die in agony. One night she is awakened by Matoga, another neighbour, who informs her that Big Foot is dead. Duszejko is questioned by the local police chief, to whom she makes complaints about her missing dogs which he dismisses. After seeing Duszejko, the police chief meets with Wnetrzak, a local businessman, who gives the chief an ultimatum about money the chief owes him. Duszejko complains to the local priest about the loss of her dogs but she is chastised for being blasphemous to treat animals like humans. Disturbed by the local hunting activity and the killing of animals in the area, she attempts to interrupt a local hunt but is stopped and humiliated by Wnetrzak.

In the winter, she and Dyzio, an IT expert working for the police, see the police chief's abandoned vehicle at night and discover the chief's body nearby. He is dead from a blow to the head and there are animal tracks near the body. Questioned about the body by the prosecutor, who is Matoga's son, she talks about the tracks she found and her theory of astrology. The prosecutor dismisses her theories. Duszejko befriends Dyzio and Dobra Nowina, who now works for Wnetrzak in a shop by day and in a brothel that Wnetrzak runs by night. Dyzio is thankful to Duszejko for keeping his epilepsy a secret or else he would lose his job. Dobra Nowina has a younger brother who is being abused by their father and has attempted to gain custody of him but learns that Wnetrzak has reported her as unfit twice. Later Duszejko discovers the body of a young boar and attempts to report an off-season killing of the animal but is laughed off by the police.

In the summer, Duszejko meets a Czech entomologist, Boros Schneider, in the forest. He has discovered Wnetrzak's body which has been in the forest for months and reports it to the police. Duszejko and Boros begin a romantic relationship and Boros explains to her about pheromones that attract certain beetles. Duszejko is questioned by the prosecutor about Wnetrzak's death. She proffers a theory that the victims were killed by animals since they were all hunters. Dobra Nowina is arrested for Wnetrzak's death, because of threats she made against him. With Matoga, Duszejko goes to a costumed ball attended by all the locals. She sees the drunken mayor Wolski abusing his wife, telling her to wait in the car while he continues his partying. Duszejko comforts the wife and tells her to go home and that she will look after Wolski and make sure he gets home.

The next day police show up at her place and arrest her for Wolski's death, because she was the last one to see the mayor alive. She says that she did go to look for the mayor that evening and, since nobody knew where he was, assumed someone else took him home. She then explains her theory of astrology to the police who get flustered at her and release her. She attends a church service and, very upset by the priest's sermon which gives thanks to the hunters, is removed from the church. While outside the church, she sees a magpie carrying an object to the church tower (earlier she had said magpies start fires by carrying lighted cigarette butts to their nests).

Duszejko then has a flashback about the death of the police chief. She was the one who killed the police chief by striking him on the head when she accidentally came upon him while skiing. After making animal tracks around the body, she rushed home and attempted to flee but her vehicle would not start. There is another flashback where she lures Wnetrzak to the forest using a ruse about money she had found and she strikes him on the head until he dies, after which she goes to his fox farm and releases all the animals.

Dyzio, who is with Dobra Nowina, recalls that the mayor's body was covered with beetles and that Duszejko would carry pheromones that attracted the beetles. Dyzio then reasons that Duszejko was responsible for all the deaths. When Dyzio learns that the church is on fire and the priest is dead, he goes with Dobra Nowina to see Matoga and finds him sitting with Duszejko at her kitchen table. They hand Dobra Nowina a photo which shows all the local hunters displaying the spoils of a hunt, which included Duszejko's two dogs. Duszejko said she found the photo at Big Foot's place after his death. Duszejko then recounts the death of the mayor, who she found alone and very drunk after the party. She confronted him about shooting her dogs and he admitted it but said he didn't know they were her dogs. She tells him to drink the pheromones she had with her and then walks him into the forest under the guise of taking him home.

Matoga, Dyzio and Dobra Nowina decide they will help Duszejko and manage to sneak her out of town. The police are on to Duszejko and are out in full force in an attempt to arrest her. Dyzio uses his IT skills to cut the power to the town, which allows them to escape. In the final scene, Duszejko with two new dogs, Matoga, Dyzio, Dobra Nowina, Dobra Nowina's little brother and Boros are all having lunch happily at a house in what is probably a neighbouring country.

== Cast ==
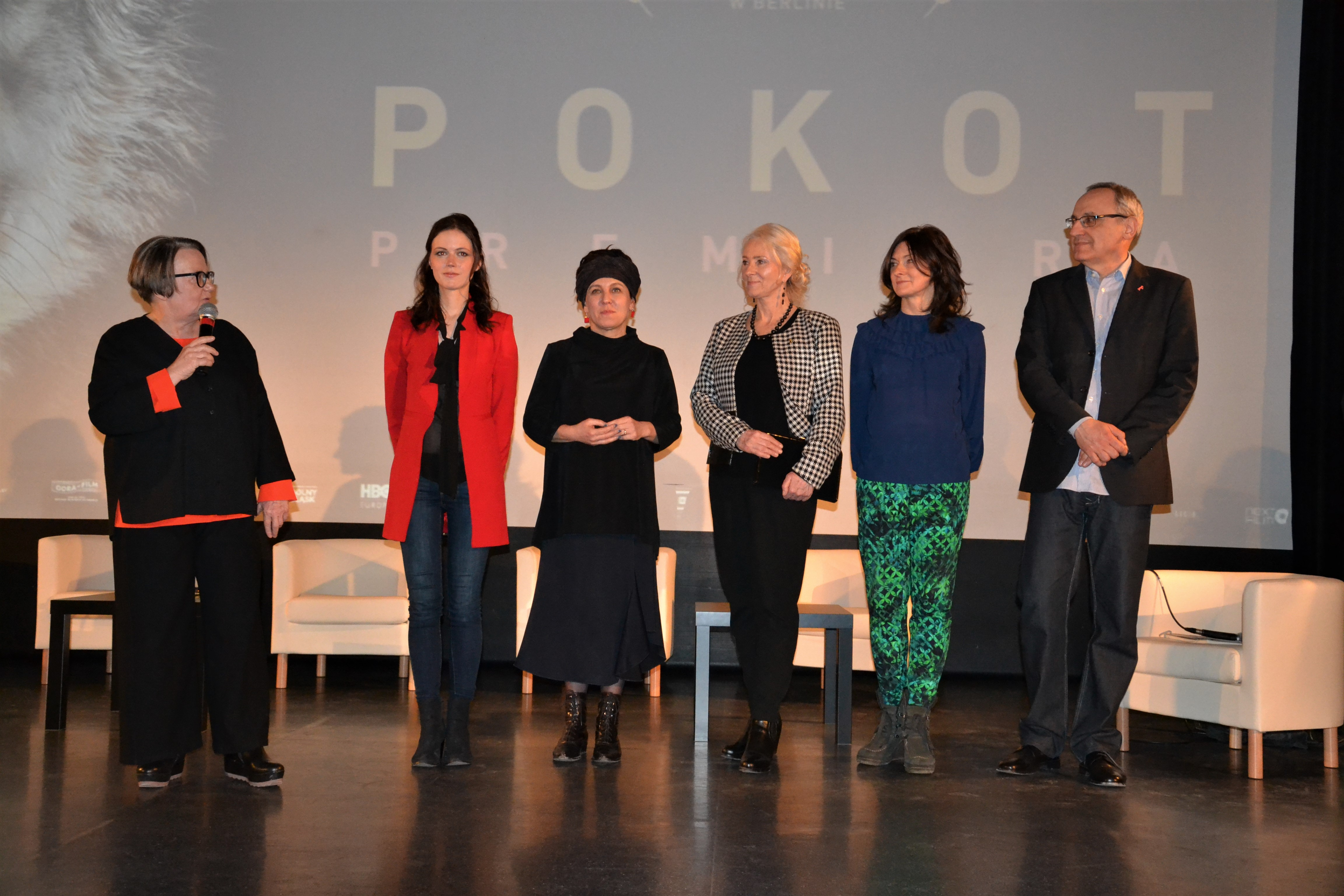
Discussion with Holland at the premiere of Spoor (Pokot) in Nowa Ruda, south-western Poland

- Agnieszka Mandat- Janina Duszejko
- Wiktor Zborowski- Matoga
- Jakub Gierszał- Dyzio
- Patrycja Volny- Dobra Nowina/Maria Cicha
- Miroslav Krobot- Boros
- Andrzej Grabowski- Prezes Wolski
- Katarzyna Herman- Zona Prezesa
- Tomasz Kot- Prosecutor Świerszczyński
- Borys Szyc- Jarosław Wnętrzak
- Marcin Bosak- Father Szlest

== Reception ==
=== Critical response ===
On review aggregator website Rotten Tomatoes, the film holds an approval rating of 74% based on 42 reviews, and an average rating of 6.8/10. On Metacritic, the film has a weighted average score of 61 out of 100, based on 6 critics, indicating "generally favorable reviews".

In a feature in Film Comment, Amy Taubin praised the film's political critique and its beauty, stating, “Sprawling, wildly beautiful, emotionally enveloping, Spoor earns its vision of utopia. It would not be the most resonant and inspiring political film of the century if it did not give us hope.”

In a positive review for the Krakow Post Giuseppe Sedia wrote, "enriched with some majestic close-ups of wild animals caught in their natural habitat and framed à la Sergei Parajanov, Holland’s film is a sturdy environmental thriller film drenched in a very Czech black humor that could charm trappers and mushroom hunters alike".

In February 2017, director Holland said in an interview for The Guardian: "One journalist for the Polish news agency wrote that we had made a deeply anti-Christian film that promoted eco-terrorism. We read that with some satisfaction and we are thinking of putting it on the promotional posters, because it will encourage people who might otherwise not have bothered to come and see it."

== See also ==
- List of submissions to the 90th Academy Awards for Best Foreign Language Film
- List of Polish submissions for the Academy Award for Best Foreign Language Film
