= Jenovéfa Boková =

Czech actress and violinist

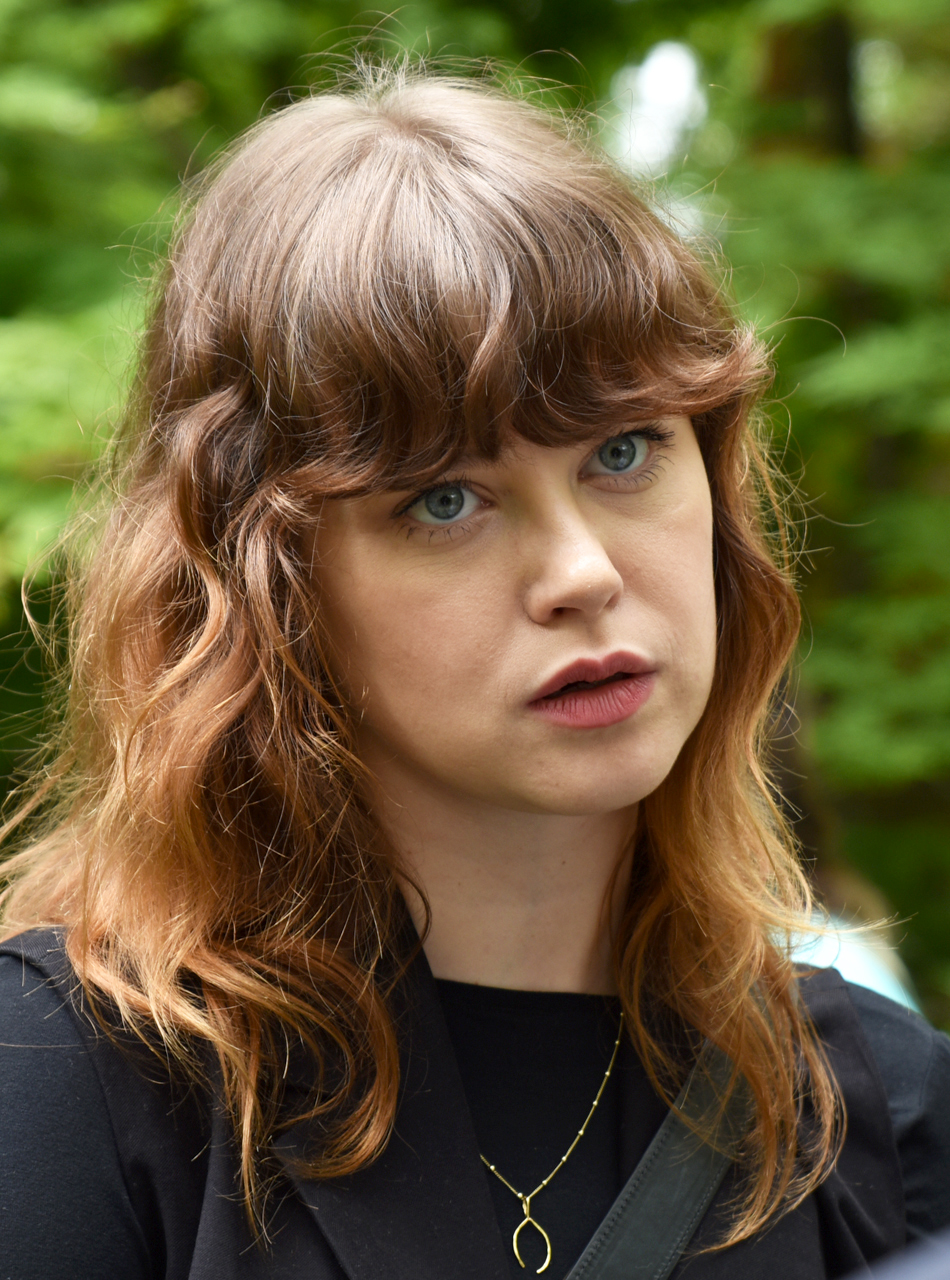
- Boková in 2022
- Born: 16 May 1992 (age 33); Prague, Czechoslovakia
- Occupation: Actress
- Years active: 1998-present

Jenovéfa Boková (born 16 May 1992) is a Czech actress and violinist. At the 2018 Czech Lion Awards she won the category of Best Actress, for her performance in the film Moments. For her performance in the 2013 film Revival, she received a nomination for Best Supporting Actress at the 2013 Czech Lions, but the winner was announced as Jaroslava Pokorná. She is the daughter of political activist John Bok and younger sister of Czech actress Kristýna Boková.

== Selected filmography ==
- Identity Card (2010)
- Burning Bush (2013)
- Revival (2013)
- Family Film (2015)
- Green Horse Rustlers (2016)
- Moments (2018)
- Franz (2025)

== Awards and nominations ==
Year	Association	Category	Work	Result
2013	Czech Lion Awards	Best Supporting Actress	Revival	Nominated
2018	Czech Film Critics' Awards	Best Actress	Moments	Won
2018	Czech Lion Awards	Best Actress	Moments	Won
