= Inspekce =

- Genre: Crime
- Directed by: David Laňka
- Starring: Vojtěch Dyk; Kristýna Ryška; Martin Finger; Kryštof Bartoš
- Country of origin: Czech Republic
- Original language: Czech
- No. of seasons: 1
- No. of episodes: 8

Production
- Producer: Jindřich Motýl
- Cinematography: Václav Tlapák
- Running time: 55 minutes

Original release
- Network: Prima+
- Release: 22 May 2026 -->

Inspekce is a Czech crime television series. The series focuses on the work of General Inspection of Security Forces (GIBS) and is being created in cooperation with this institution. The series is directed by David Laňka and stars Vojtěch Dyk, Kristýna Ryška, Martin Finger and Kryštof Bartoš.

The series premiered on the Prima+ platform. The premiere date was set for April 4, 2026 but eventually was released on 22 May 2026.

== Plot ==
The series is partly inspired by real cases. The main character of the series, police officer Adam Volf, leaves the National Drug Headquarters and joins the ranks of GIBS after he reveals suspicious manipulation of drug evidence from police raids which costs him the trust of his colleagues. He meets analyst Dana Majerová who helps him solve cases related to corruption within police. In the past, Adam lost a friend a with whom he served in the National Drug Headquarters. The friend died during an operation that Adam did not participate in, even though he should have. This event left him with a deep trauma and a sense of guilt. The guilt is all the stronger because the friend left behind a wife, Bára, and a young daughter. He meets Bára again and they start getting closer.

== Cast ==
- Vojtěch Dyk as Adam Volf
- Kristýna Ryška as Dana Majerová
- Štěpánka Ligas as Bára, widow of Adam's deceased colleague
- Martin Finger as Pavel Gruber, Chief of GIBS
- Jan Čenský as JUDr. Miroslav Kunc, prosecutor
- Kryštof Bartoš as detective of National Drug Headquarters (NPC)
- Michal Slaný as Michal Oláh, detective of NPC
- Adrian Jastraban as chief of NPC
- Pavlína Balner as bartender
- Marek Sendecký as Tibor Horváth

== Production ==
The series was filmed in the fall of 2025, mostly in Litoměřice. Shooting took 56 days. Shooting locations included Slavoj Litoměřice rowing club or Bělušice Prison. Some parts were shot in Most region.
