= Agnieszka Mandat =

Polish film actress

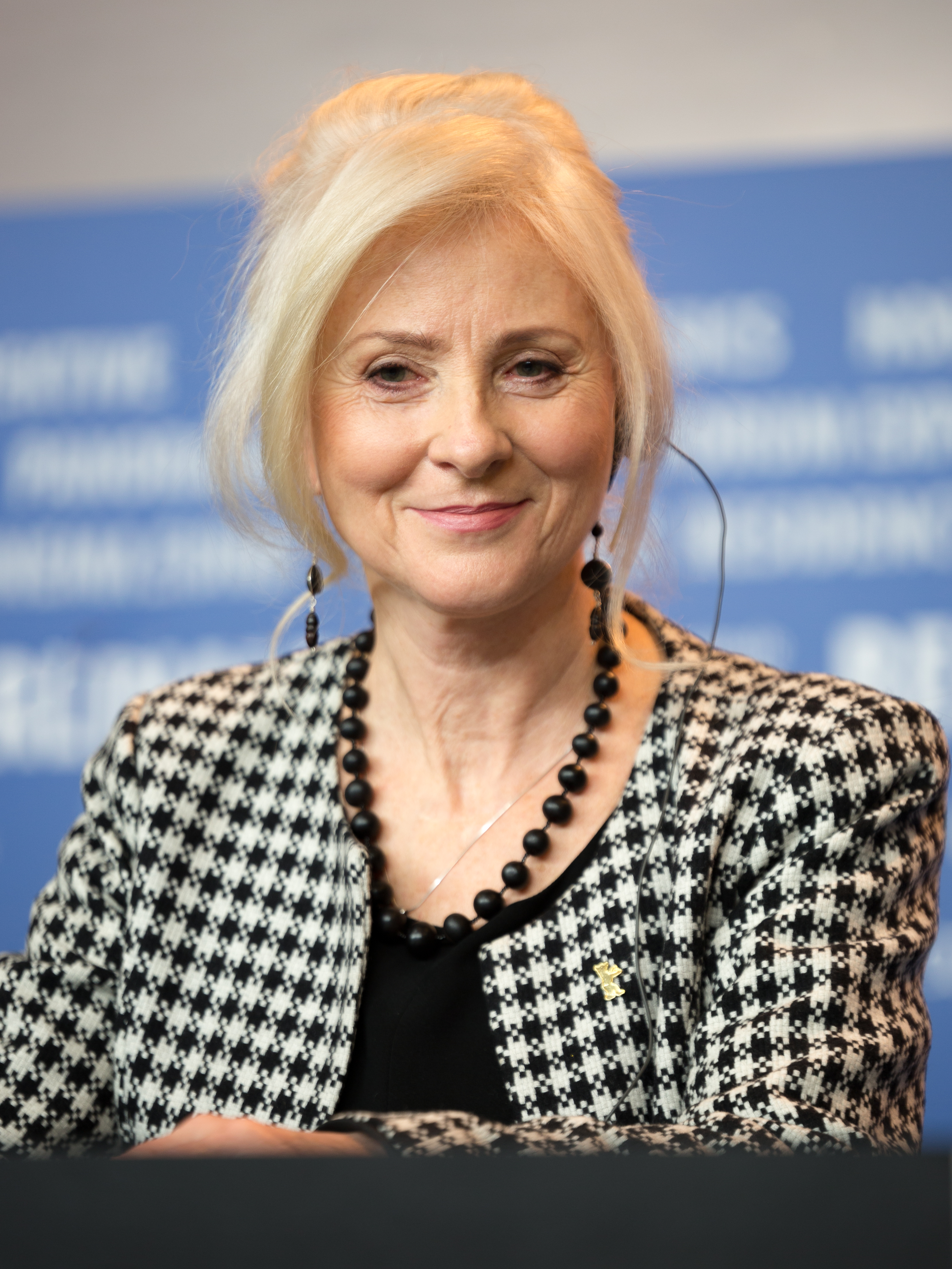
Agnieszka Mandat (Pokot, Berlinale) in 2017

Agnieszka Mandat (born 29 May 1953) is a Polish actress. Her film credits include Spoor and Zwerbowana milosc. Her television credits include The Crown and the Kings and Nad rozlewiskiem....

== Career ==
In 1976, she graduated from the State Higher School of Theater in Krakow. In the same year, she made her debut on the stage of the Stary Theater in Krakow in the play Friends, directed by Jerzy Jarocki.

Since 27 October 1978 she has been performing at the Television Theatre. Her television debut was the role of the daughter in the play Pelikan directed by Feliks Falk. In 2010, for her role in the play Russian Jam, she received an acting award at the Festival of the Polish Radio Theater and the Polish Television Theater "Dwa Teatry". In 2014, she resigned from her job at the Stary Theater.

She played in over forty films and series. She gained nationwide popularity in Poland thanks to the series Dom nad rozlewiskiem and its sequels (2009–2014). In 2017, for her role in Spoor by Agnieska Holland, she received an Honorable Mention at the Zielona Góra Film and Theater Festival and a nomination for the Polish Film Awards "Eagles".
