= Antoni Łazarkiewicz =

Polish film score composer (born 1980)

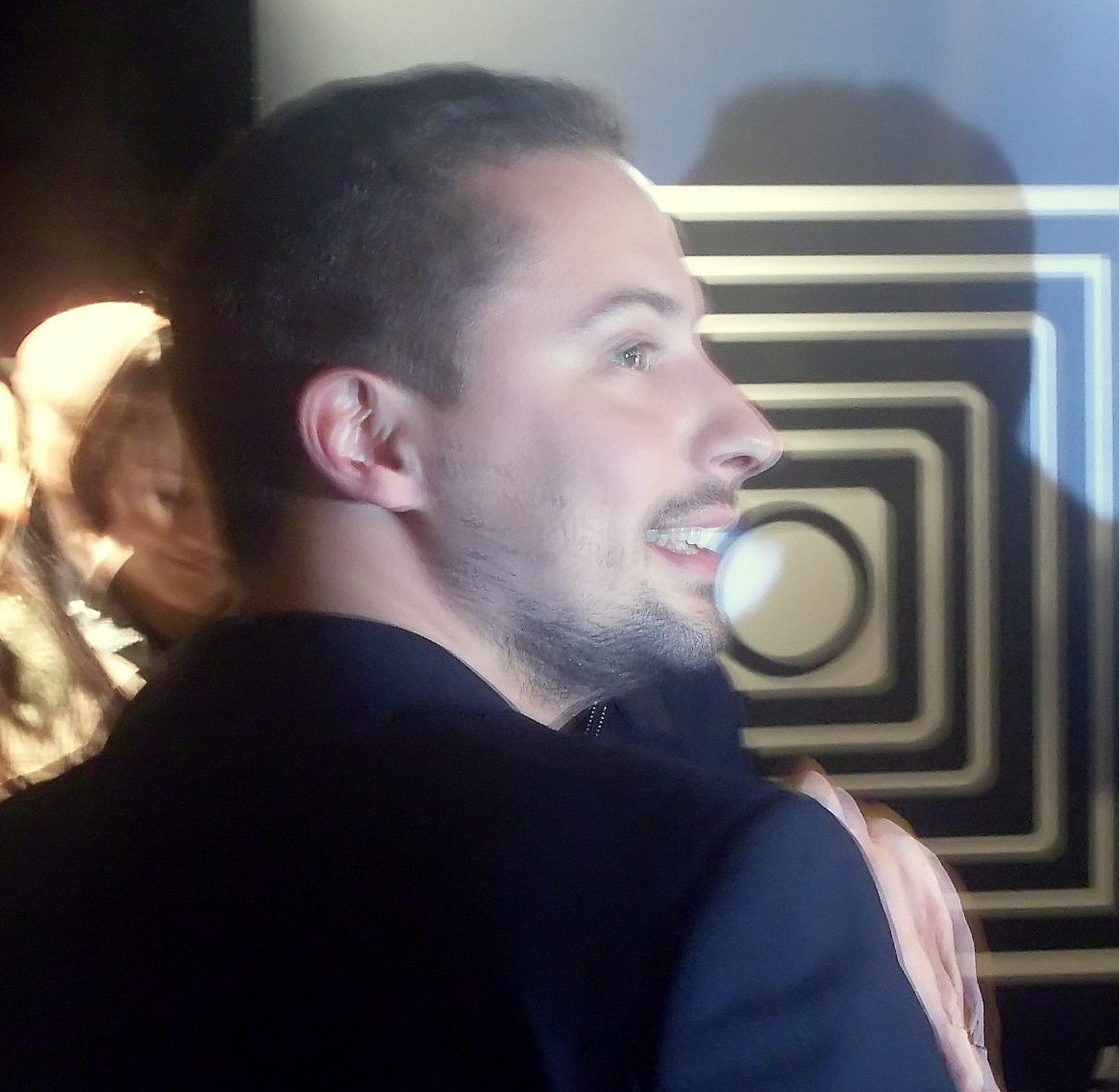
- Antoni Łazarkiewicz in 2008
- Occupation: Composer

Antoni Aleksander Komasa-Łazarkiewicz (born 12 March 1980) is a film score composer and actor.

== Biography ==
Son of Magdalena Łazarkiewicz and Piotr Łazarkiewicz, brother of Gabriela Łazarkiewicz-Sieczko, father of Milena Łazarkiewicz.

He graduate from the Chopin Secondary Music School in Warsaw (clarinet and percussion classes) and the Academy of Music in Kraków, from the Composition Department under the supervision of Marek Stachowski. He was chosen a member of the Polish Film Academy.

== Filmography (as music composer) ==
- Copying Beethoven (2006)
- Janosik: A True Story (2009)
- In Darkness (2011)
- Burning Bush (2013)
- Warsaw 44 (2014)
- Rosemary's Baby (2014)
- Clair Obscur (2016)
- Spoor (2017)
- The Affair (2019)
- Mr. Jones (2019)
- Charlatan (2020)
- Adventures of a Mathematician (2020)
- Quo Vadis, Aida? (2020)
- In the Rearview (2023)
- Treasure (2024)
- Brother (2024)
- Franz (2025)
- Through the Wall (2026)

== Accolades ==
- 2013 Czech Lion Awards: Best Music for Burning Bush
- 2020 Czech Lion Awards: nomination in Best Music for Charlatan
- 2021 Polish Film Awards: nomination in Best Film Score for Charlatan
- 2025 Czech Lion Awards: nomination in Best Music for Franz
- 2026 Polish Film Awards: nominations in Best Film Score for Franz and Brother
