= Janosik: A True Story =

2009 European film

Janosik: A True Story / Jánošík – Pravdivá historia / Janosik – Prawdziwa histori
- Directed by: Kasia Adamik; Agnieszka Holland
- Written by: Eva Borušovičová
- Produced by: Apple Film Production; Rudolf Biermann; Dariusz Jabłoński
- Cinematography: Martin Štrba
- Edited by: Michał Czarnecki
- Music by: Antoni Łazarkiewicz
- Distributed by: Syrena Films
- Release date: 4 September 2009
- Running time: 137 minutes
- Countries: Czech Republic; Slovakia; Poland; Hungary

Janosik: A True Story (also known as Janosik. Prawdziwa historia or Jánošík – Pravdivá história) is a Polish/Czech/Slovak historical film about Slovak national hero and highwayman Juraj Jánošík. It was directed by Agnieszka Holland and her daughter Kasia Adamik, and released in 2009.

== Cast ==
- Václav Jiráček as Juraj Jánošík
- Ivan Martinka as Tomasz Uhorczyk
- Michał Żebrowski as Turjag Huncaga
- Sarah Zoe Canner as Barbara
- Maja Ostaszewska as Margeta
- Katarzyna Herman as Zuzanna
- Táňa Pauhofová as Anusia
- Danuta Szaflarska as Janosik's grandmother
- Marian Dziędziel as Szyposz
- Eryk Lubos as Gabor
- Marek Probosz as Satora
- Karel Dobrý
- Michał Sieczkowski
- Richard Krajčo
- Marián Labuda st. as Kristof Ugronovic
- Krzysztof Stroiński as Lani
- Małgorzata Zajączkowska as Janosik's Mother
- Rafał Maćkowiak as Baron Revay
- Adrian Jastraban
- Marián Geišberg
- Vladimír Jedľovský
- Vojtěch Dyk
- David Novotný
- Zuzana Norisová
- Kateřina Lojdová
- Matěj Hádek
- Zdeněk Maryška
- Vladimír Kudla
- Jana Postlerová
- Stanislava Jachnická
- Filip Jančík
- Miloš Vávra
- Kateřina Brožová

== See also ==
Janosik – a 1974 Polish TV series directed by Jerzy Passendorfer
