= Walk of shame (disambiguation) =

Walk of shame refers to a situation in which a person must walk past strangers or peers alone, usually after having had casual sex.

Walk of shame or Walk of Shame may also refer to:

- Walk of Shame (film), 2014
- "Walk of Shame" (song), a song by Pink from her album The Truth About Love
- "Walk of Shame", a song by The Like from their album Release Me
- Walk of Shame, 2011 country music album by Nikki Lane
- The exit a player makes after being voted out on The Weakest Link.
- "Walkashame", a song by Meghan Trainor from her album Title

== See also ==
- Walk of fame (disambiguation)
- Shame (disambiguation)
