= Dagmar Burešová =

Czech lawyer and politician

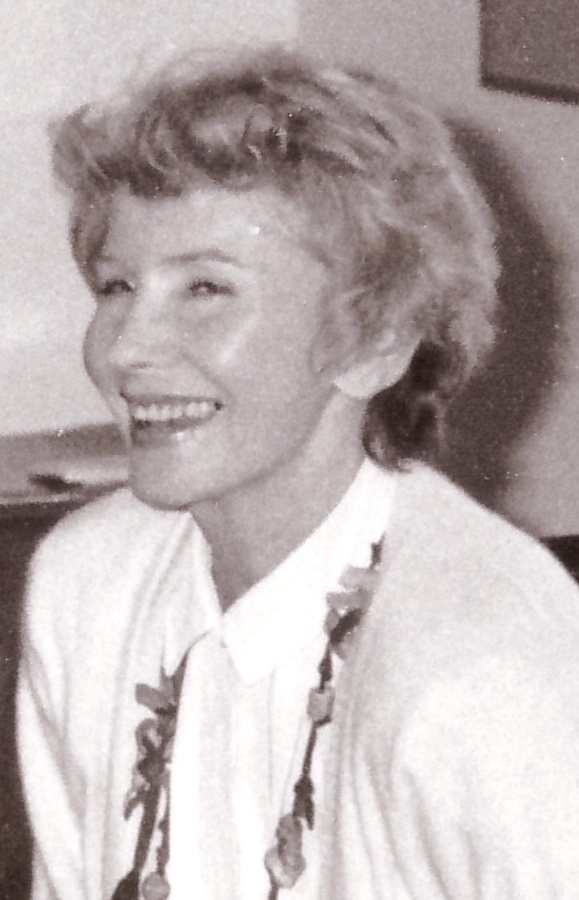
- Dagmar Burešová in 1991

Minister of Justice of Czechoslovakia
- In office 1989–1990
- Prime Minister: Marián Čalfa

Chairman of the Czech National Council
- In office 1990–1992
- Prime Minister: Marián Čalfa

Personal details
- Born: 19 October 1929 Prague, First Czechoslovak Republic
- Died: 30 June 2018 (aged 88) Prague, Czech Republic

Dagmar Burešová (19 October 1929 – 30 June 2018) was a Czech lawyer and politician. She specialised in labour law. She was known for her defence of Libuše Palachová, the mother of Jan Palach, a young man that self immolated to protest the Soviet absorption of his country, a drama featured in the 2013 miniseries Burning Bush. As a politician, Burešová served as the first Minister of Justice of Czechoslovakia, after the Velvet Revolution. She was the chair of the Czech National Council from 1990 to 1992.

== Personal life and death ==
Burešová was born in 1929 in Prague. Burešová's father was a lawyer during the First Czechoslovak Republic. She studied law at Charles University in Prague, and during that time, she hid a classmate who had escaped from a communist prison. She put her friend in touch with Petr Kopta, who helped him flee to Munich, West Germany. A recount of the events was featured in Petr Toman's book Advokáti proti totalitě (Lawyers Against Totalitarianism).

In 1950, she married Radim Bureš, a paediatrician, and they had two daughters. Burešová's father-in-law was also a lawyer and her mother-in-law Charlotta Burešová was an artist. Her youngest daughter could not go to school due to Burešová's controversial work.

Burešová died on 30 June 2018 after a long illness.

== Career ==
As a lawyer, Burešová worked in labour law. Her motto was "Cowardice should be a criminal offence." She defended over 100 people who lost their jobs or were persecuted after the Warsaw Pact invasion of Czechoslovakia in 1968. She also defended writer Milan Kundera, Ivan Medek, who later served under Czech President Václav Havel, as well as Karel Kyncl, and Libuše Palachová, the mother of Jan Palach. Palachová wanted to posthumously clear her son's name from lies that Communist Party of Czechoslovakia member Vilém Nový spread after Palach's self immolation. After defending Palachová, Burešová was watched by the StB. The case was featured in the 2013 three part miniseries Burning Bush.

After the Velvet Revolution, Burešová served as the first Minister of Justice of Czechoslovakia, from 1989 to 1990. Burešová supported judicial reform. From 1990 to 1992, she was chairperson of the Czech National Council. Between 1990 and 1991, Burešová held negotiations on a peace treaty and land division settlement between the Czech Republic and Slovakia. She initially opposed the idea of a treaty between the countries.

In 1996, Burešová was a KDU-ČSL candidate for the Senate of the Czech Republic. She was not elected, and was second of 10 candidates. Burešová also worked as a chair of the Czech-German Fund for the Future, which gives money to Czechs who were affected by the Nazis, and was the leader of the scouting organisation of Junák.

== Awards ==
In 2002, Burešová was awarded the Order of Tomáš Garrigue Masaryk.
