= Burning Bush (miniseries) =

2013 Czech miniseries

- Also known as: Hořící keř
- Genre: Drama/Biography
- Directed by: Agnieszka Holland
- Starring: Tatiana Pauhofová; Jaroslava Pokorná; Petr Stach; Vojtěch Kotek; Igor Bareš; Adrian Jastraban; Ivan Trojan
- Composer: Antoni Komasa-Łazarkiewicz
- Country of origin: Czech Republic
- Original language: Czech
- No. of episodes: 3

Production
- Production location: Prague
- Running time: 84, 72, and 78 minutes, respectively
- Production companies: nutprodukce HBO Europe

Original release
- Network: HBO Europe
- Release: 27 January – 10 February 2013

Burning Bush (Czech: Hořící keř) is a 2013 three-part miniseries created for HBO by Polish director Agnieszka Holland. Based on real characters and events, this haunting drama focuses on the personal sacrifice of a Prague history student, Jan Palach, who set himself on fire in 1969 in protest against the Soviet occupation of Czechoslovakia in the previous year. Dagmar Burešová, a young female lawyer, became part of his legacy by defending Palach's family in a trial against the communist government, a regime which tried to dishonour Palach’s sacrifice, a heroic action for the freedom of Czechoslovakia.

The fight for freedom, for moral principles, self-sacrifice, and protest in those desperate times led to the moral unification of a repressed nation, which twenty years later defeated the totalitarian regime. The anniversary of Jan Palach’s death inspired a new generation of students to start protests that led to the eventual fall of communism in Czechoslovakia, part of the eventual destruction of the Iron Curtain.

Lawyer Dagmar Burešová, who spent her life representing dissident opposition leaders, became the first Minister of Justice in a free Czechoslovakia.

The film is dedicated to Jan Palach, Jan Zajíc, Evžen Plocek, Ryszard Siwiec, and all who sacrificed their lives while fighting for freedom.

At the International TV Festival in Monte Carlo, Ivan Trojan was awarded the prize of Golden Nymph for the Best Actor in a mini-series. It has been selected to be screened in the Special Presentation section at the 2013 Toronto International Film Festival.

The series was later edited into a film. The premiere of the film version was set to be on 12 September 2013. The film was originally selected as the Czech entry for the Best Foreign Language Film at the 86th Academy Awards. However AMPAS disqualified the film, citing regulations that the film must not have initially appeared on television. The mini-series aired on Czech TV eight months prior to the re-edited version that appeared in cinemas.

== Cast ==
- Tatiana Pauhofová as JUDr. Dagmar Burešová, a lawyer of the Palach family
- Jaroslava Pokorná as Libuše Palachová, Jan Palach's mother
- Petr Stach as Jiří Palach, Palach's brother
- Ivan Trojan as Major Jireš, Public security (police) officer who investigates Palach's death (fictional character)
- Igor Bareš as Major Dočekal, secret police StB ("state secret security") (fictional character)
- Vojtěch Kotek as Ondřej Trávníček, a student activist (composite character)
- Jan Budař as Radim Bureš, Burešová's husband
- Adrian Jastraban as Vladimír Charouz, Burešová's superior
- Patrik Děrgel as Pavel Janda
- Denny Ratajský as Lieutenant Boček, Jireš's workmate
- Tomáš Dianiška as Mlíko
- Jenovéfa Boková as Vlaďka Charouzová, Charouz's daughter
- Ivana Uhlířová as Judge Orlová
- Stanislav Zindulka as JUDr. Sládeček, lawyer, colleague of Burešová
- Ondřej Malý as JUDr. Knapp, lawyer, colleague of Burešová
- Martin Huba as Vilém Nový, a communist official who defames Palach
- Míša Procházková as Zuzanka Burešová, Burešová's daughter
- Tereza Korejsová as Lucinka Burešová, Burešová's daughter
- Alois Švehlík as Colonel Horyna, high-ranking Public security commander, superior of Jireš and Dočekal
- Hana Marie Maroušková as Ilona Palachová, Jiří Palach's wife
- Miroslav Krobot as conductor Jiřička
- Emma Smetana as Hana Čížková
- Taťjana Medvecká as MUDr. Jana Ziková, a doctor who treats Palach at the hospital
- Pavel Cisovský as comrade Hazura
