= Lenka Krobotová =

Czech actress

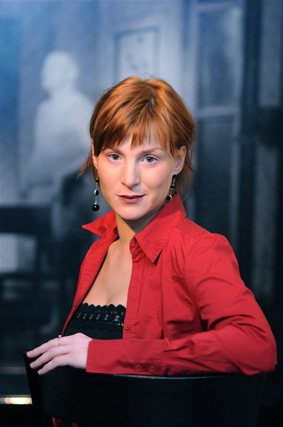
- Born: 10 March 1977 (age 48); Plzeň, Czechoslovakia
- Occupation: Actress
- Years active: 1991-present
- Parent(s): Miroslav Krobot; Hana Doulová

Lenka Krobotová (born 10 March 1977) is a Czech actress. She won the Czech Lion award for Best Supporting Actress in 2014 for her role in the film Díra u Hanušovic. She is the daughter of actor and director Miroslav Krobot and the actress Hana Doulová.
