= Walk of fame (disambiguation) =

A walk of fame is an outdoor tribute to notable individuals.

Walk of fame may also refer to:

- "Walk of Fame" (The Price is Right game), a former pricing game on the American game show The Price is Right
- Walk of Fame (film), a 2017 American comedy film
- Walk of Fame (song), a 2025 song by Miley Cyrus from the album Something Beautiful

== See also ==
- Walk of shame (disambiguation)
