= Kasia Adamik =

Polish film director (born 1972)

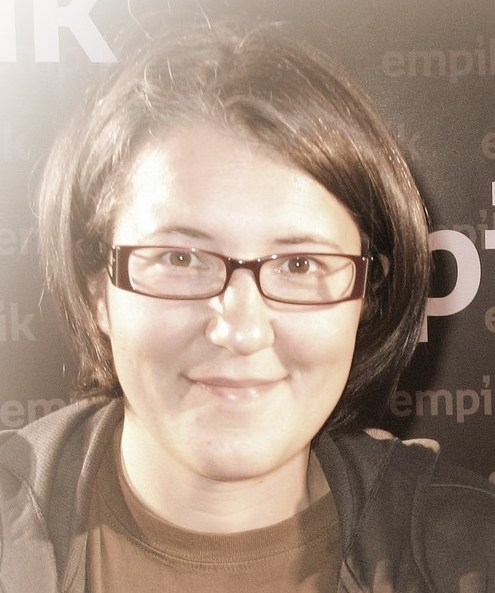
- Adamik in 2009
- Born: 28 December 1972 (age 53); Warsaw, Poland
- Occupations: Director; storyboard artist
- Parent: Agnieszka Holland (mother)
- Relatives: Magdalena Łazarkiewicz (aunt)

Katarzyna "Kasia" Adamik (born 28 December 1972) is a Polish director and storyboard artist. She has directed TV series including 1983, Axis Mundi, and Absentia. Her debut film feature as director, Bark!, was in competition at Sundance Film Festival. Adamik and Olga Chajdas shared the award for Best TV Show at the Polish Film Awards for directing drama The Pack. A Hollywood Reporter article listed her among "four of the country's most prominent directors", naming her alongside the fellow Polish directors she worked on for conspiracy thriller series 1983, which was Netflix's first Polish original series.

== Personal life ==
Adamik was born in Warsaw, the daughter of Polish film director Agnieszka Holland and Slovak opera director Laco Adamík. Her aunt is film director Magdalena Łazarkiewicz. She graduated in graphics from the Academy of Fine Arts in Brussels.

She came out as a lesbian in 2012.

== Career ==
Adamik debuted in the film industry in 1993. She has worked as a storyboard artist on an array of movies, including In Darkness, Copying Beethoven, Everything Is Illuminated, Catwoman, Trapped, Julie Walking Home, Angel of Death, Hearts in Atlantis, Angel Eyes, Golden Dreams, Battlefield Earth, Na koniec swiata, The Third Miracle, The Wood, Beloved, Wicked, Polish Wedding, Washington Square, and Total Eclipse. 1983, a Polish-language TV series directed by Adamik and Agnieszka Holland, debuted on Netflix in 2018 as the streaming service's first Polish-language original production.

== Filmography ==
=== Filmography ===
Year	Title	Notes
1995	Total Eclipse	storyboard artist
1997	Washington Square	storyboard artist
1998	Beloved	storyboard artist
1998	Polish Wedding	storyboard artist
1998	Wicked	storyboard artist
1999	The Third Miracle	storyboard artist
1999	The Wood	storyboard artist
1999	Na koniec swiata	storyboard artist
2000	Battlefield Earth	storyboard artist
2001	Golden Dreams'	storyboard artist
2001	Hearts in Atlantis	storyboard artist
2002	Bark!	director
2002	Julie Walking Home	storyboard artist
2002	Trapped	storyboard artist
2004	Catwoman	storyboard artist
2005	Everything Is Illuminated	storyboard artist
2006	Copying Beethoven	storyboard artist
2009	Janosik: A True Story	co-director with Agnieszka Holland
2011	In Darkness	storyboard artist
2017	Absentia	director (9 episodes)
2018	1983	director (4 episodes)
2025	Winter of the Crow	director
2026	Star City	director (2 episodes)
