= Shames =

Shames may refer to:

- Shames Mountain Ski Area
- The Shames, American rock band of 1960a
- Shames (surname)

== See also ==
- Shame (disambiguation)
