= Revival (2013 film) =

- Directed by: Alice Nellis
- Written by: Alice Nellis
- Starring: Bolek Polívka; Marián Geišberg; Karel Heřmánek; Miroslav Krobot
- Cinematography: Matěj Cibulka
- Edited by: Filip Issa
- Music by: Jan Ponocný
- Release date: 11 July 2013
- Running time: 111 minutes
- Country: Czech Republic
- Language: Czech

Revival is a 2013 comedy film written and directed by Alice Nellis and starring Bolek Polívka, Marián Geišberg, Karel Heřmánek and Miroslav Krobot. The film won the Audience Award at the 48th Karlovy Vary International Film Festival in 2013. Revival received 11 nominations at the 2013 Czech Lion Awards, but did not win in any categories.

== Cast ==
- Bolek Polívka as Václav
- Miroslav Krobot as Karel
- Karel Heřmánek as Milan
- Marián Geišberg as Otakar
- Zuzana Bydžovská as Yvonne
- Jenovéfa Boková as Miriam
- Lucie Žáčková
- Vojtěch Dyk as Vojta
- Jana Hubinská as Libuška
