= Henryk Holland =

Polish journalist

- Born: 8 April 1920; Warsaw, Second Polish Republic
- Died: 21 December 1961 (aged 41); Warsaw, Polish People's Republic
- Burial place: Powązki Military Cemetery
- Relatives: Agnieszka Holland (daughter)
- Military career
- Allegiance: USSR; Polish People's Republic
- Branch: Red Army; Polish People's Army
- Service years: 1941–1945
- Rank: Kapitan (Captain)
- Unit: 2nd Warsaw Infantry Division
- Conflicts: Second World War
- Other work: sociologist, journalist, publicist

Henryk Holland (8 April 1920 – 21 December 1961) was a Polish sociologist, journalist, writer, captain in the Polish People's Army, and communist activist. He was the father of film directors Agnieszka Holland and Magdalena Łazarkiewicz.

In 1961, while being arrested by the Communist secret service, Holland jumped out of a window, which led to his death. This event was then widely discussed by dissidents and theories of a possible murder were popular.

== Awards and decorations ==
- Knight's Cross of the Order of Polonia Restituta (13 July 1946)
- Cross of Valour
- Silver Cross of Merit (12 April 1946)
- Medal "For Merit on the Field of Glory"
- Medal for Oder, Neisse and Baltic
- Medal of Victory and Freedom 1945
- Medal "For the Victory over Germany in the Great Patriotic War 1941–1945" (USSR)
