= Patrycja Volny =

German-born Polish actress

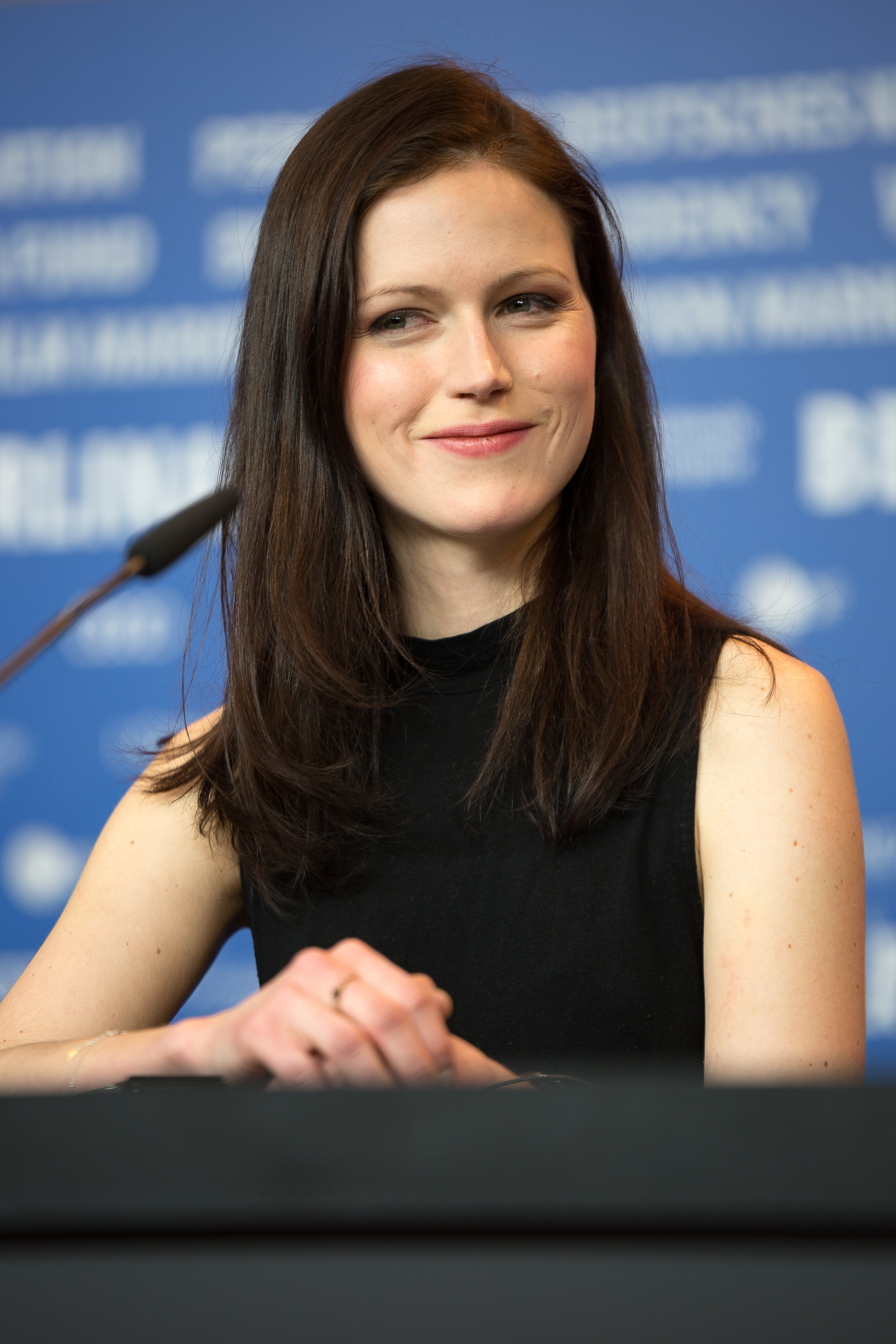
- Volny at the Berlinale 2017
- Born: Patrycja Volny; 5 February 1988 (age 38); Munich, West Germany
- Occupation: Actress
- Years active: 2012–present
- Parent: Jacek Kaczmarski

Patrycja Volny (born 5 February 1988) is a Polish actress known for her role as Dobra Nowina in the 2017 crime film Spoor, the Polish entry for the Best Foreign Language Film at the 90th Academy Awards. She first appeared in 2012 legal drama television series True Law. She is the only daughter of the late Polish singer and songwriter Jacek Kaczmarski.

== Filmography ==
Year	Title	Role	Notes
2012	True Law	Apprentice	TV series; 1 episode
2017	Spoor	Dobra Nowina	
2018	Golden Sting	Michelle	
2018	1983	Dana Rolbiecki	TV mini series; 5 episodes
2019	Mr Jones	Bonnie	
2019	The Resistance Fighter	Marysia	
2020	Father Matthew	Singer Eliza Meyer	TV series; 1 episode
2021	Stulecie Winnych	Lotta Miller	TV series; 9 episodes
2021	Songs about love	Kamila	
