= Radko Pytlík =

Czech literary historian and writer (1928–2022)

- Born: 8 October 1928; Prague, Czechoslovakia
- Died: 31 January 2022 (aged 93); Prague, Czech Republic
- Occupation: Writer

Radko Pytlík (8 October 1928 – 31 January 2022) was a Czech literary historian and writer.

== Life and career ==
Born in Prague, during World War II Pytlík was part of the Czech Resistance and took part in the Prague uprising. In 1952 he graduated in philosophy at the Charles University, and from 1955 he worked at the Institute of Czech and World Literature of the Czechoslovak Academy of Sciences.

Pytlík focused his studies on Czech modern literature from the 19th century onwards and particularly on Jaroslav Hašek's works and life, to whom he devoted his best known work Toulavé house, Život Jaroslava Haška, autora Osudů dobrého vojáka Švejka ("Wandering Gosling, The Life of Jaroslav Hašek, author of The Fate of the Good Soldier Švejk"), which was translated in a number of foreign languages. His works also include monographies of Franz Kafka, Fyodor Dostoevsky, Bohumil Hrabal.

Pytlík died in Prague on 31 January 2022, at the age of 93. He was the father of the singer and actor Vojtěch Dyk.
