= Shame, Shame, Shame =

Shame, Shame, Shame may refer to:

- "Shame, Shame, Shame" (Shirley & Company song), a 1974 disco hit
- "Shame Shame Shame" (Ratt song), a 1990 hit by glam rock band Ratt
- "Shame Shame Shame" (Soulshaker and CeCe Peniston song), a 2007 single by Soulshaker and CeCe Peniston
- "Shame, Shame, Shame", a 1963 single by Jimmy Reed (covered by Johnny Winter and Bryan Ferry)
- "Shame, Shame, Shame", a 1957 single by Smiley Lewis (covered by Aerosmith)
- "Shame, Shame, Shame", a 1995 song by Kenny Wayne Shepherd
- Shame, Shame, Shame (film), a 1999 film directed by Zalman King
- Shame Shame Shame, the segment used to expose fraud on the Fox 5 NY (see Arnold Díaz)
- Shame Shame Shame, a 2003 song by A-Teens
