= Shameless =

Shameless means lacking in shame. It may also refer to:

== Television and cinema ==
- Shameless (British TV series), a British television series that ran from 2004 to 2013
- Shameless, a 2007 HBO special by Louis C.K.
- Shameless (2008 film), a Czech comedy film
- Shameless (American TV series), an American television adaptation of the British series that ran from 2011 to 2021
- Shameless (2012 film), Polish film
- The Shameless, 2015 South Korean film

== Music ==
- "Shameless" (Billy Joel song), 1989, later covered by Garth Brooks
- "Shameless", a song by Pet Shop Boys from the album Alternative, 1995
- "Shameless", a song by Ani DiFranco from the album Dilate, 1996
- "Shameless", a song by Shabűtie from the EP The Penelope EP, 1999
- Shameless (album), a 2001 album by Therapy?
- "Shameless", a song by Cracker from the album Forever, 2002
- "Shameless", a song by All Time Low from the album So Wrong, It's Right, 2007
- "Shameless", a song by The Fratellis from the album Here We Stand, 2008
- "Shameless", a song by Kids in Glass Houses from the album Smart Casual, 2008
- "Shameless", a song by Man Man from the album Life Fantastic, 2011
- "Shameless" (Luca Hänni song), 2013
- "Shameless", a song by the Weeknd from the album Beauty Behind the Madness, 2015
- "Shameless" (Tarja song), 2016
- "Shameless" (Camila Cabello song), 2019
- "Shameless", a song by Jared Lee which represented Massachusetts in the American Song Contest, 2022

== Other uses ==
- Shameless (magazine), a Canadian feminist magazine for girls
- Shameless (podcast), an Australian pop culture popcast
