= Julie Walking Home =

- German DVD Cover
- Directed by: Agnieszka Holland
- Starring: Miranda Otto
- Cinematography: Jacek Petrycki
- Release dates: September 4, 2002 (Venice Film Festival); September 5, 2003
- Running time: 113 minutes
- Countries: Canada; Germany; Poland
- Language: English

Julie Walking Home is a 2002 drama film directed by Agnieszka Holland. It stars Miranda Otto and William Fichtner. It won an award at the 2003 Method Fest.

== Plot ==
Julie finds her husband Henry in bed with another woman when she returns home early from a trip with their twins, Nicholas and Nicole, who believe in magic and even have their own language. When she discovers that her son has lung cancer, Julie seeks help from a faith healer in Poland. A romantic relationship develops between Julie and Alexei, the charismatic healer. After Nicholas is cured, Alexei seeks out Julie in Canada and they begin a relationship. Nicholas gets sick again and Alexei is unable to cure him. By choosing love, Alexei has lost his gift. Although Julie is now pregnant by Alexei, she and her husband reunite, both resigned to their son's illness and trying to make the best out of the situation for their daughter's sake. In the twins' magical world, death is certainly not the end, we find out in the last scene

== Cast ==
- Miranda Otto as Julie Makowsky
- William Fichtner as Henry
- Lothaire Bluteau as Alexei
- Ryan Smith as Nicholas
- Bianca Crudo as Nicole
- Mark Day as Priest Harper
