= Marián Geišberg =

Slovak actor (1953–2018)

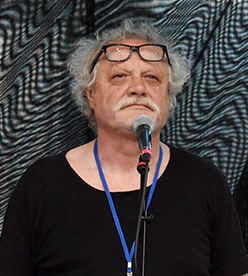
- Geišberg in 2017
- Born: 23 December 1953; Piešťany, Czechoslovakia
- Died: 10 November 2018 (aged 64)
- Occupation: Actor
- Years active: 1977–2018

Marián Geišberg (23 December 1953 – 10 November 2018) was a Slovak actor. Geišberg was recognised in 2001 for his stage acting in the Jozef Kroner Awards. Geišberg won the Best Supporting Actor award at the Sun in a Net Awards in 2019 for his role in Čertí brko. His son is Slovak actor Marek Geišberg.

== Selected filmography ==
- She Grazed Horses on Concrete (1982)
- Taming Crocodiles (2006)
- Music (2008)
- Janosik: A True Story (2009)
- Revival (2013)
- A Step into the Dark (2014)
- Three Brothers (2014)
- The Seven Ravens (2015)
- A Vote for the King of the Romans (2016)
- Čertí brko (2018)
