= Tatiana Pauhofová =

Slovak actress

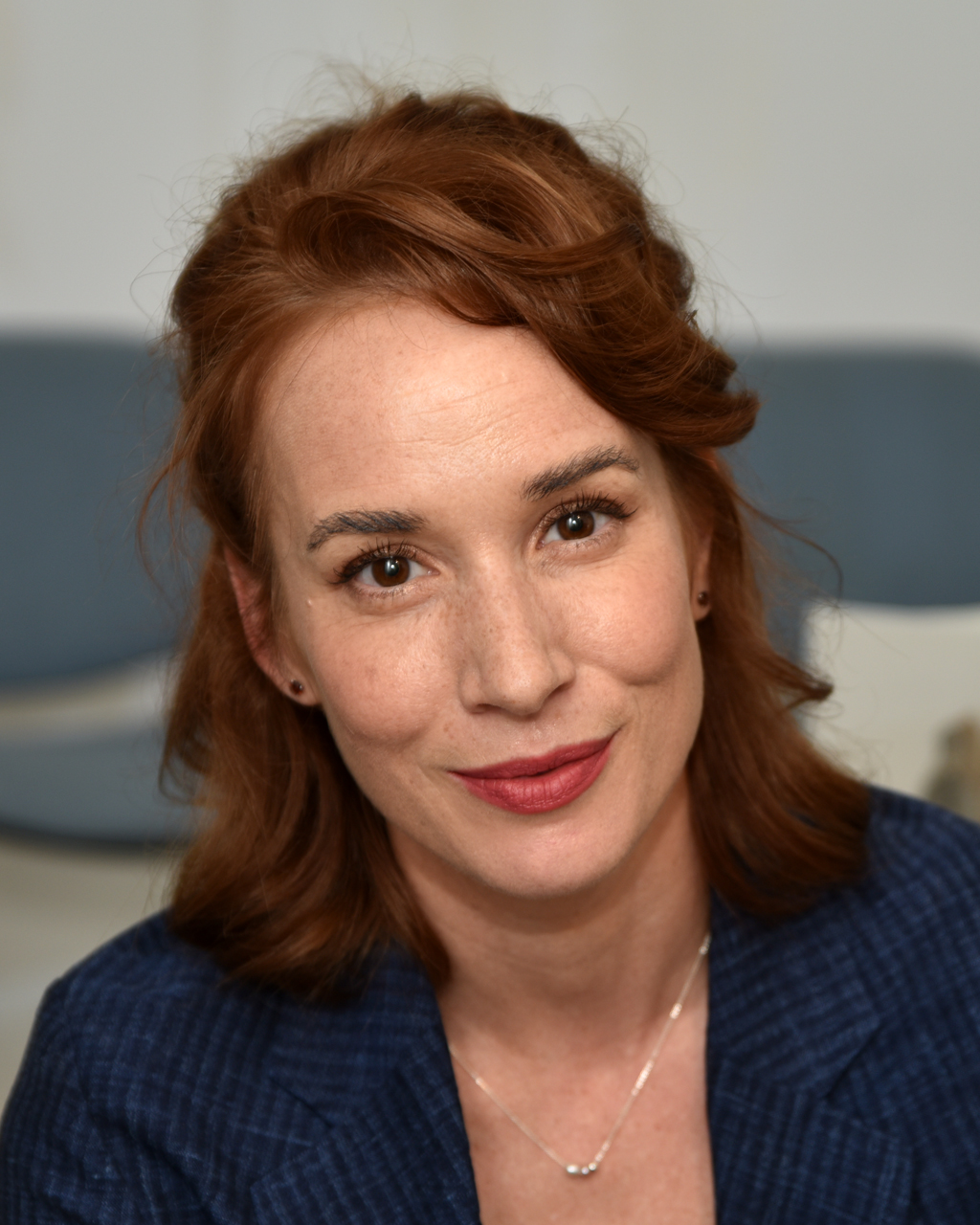
- Tatiana Pauhofová (2024)
- Born: 13 August 1983 (age 43); Bratislava, Czechoslovakia
- Education: Academy of Performing Arts
- Occupation: Actress
- Years active: 1995–present
- Spouse: Jonathán Pastirčák
- Children: 1

Tatiana Pauhofová (born 13 August 1983) is a Slovak actress born in Bratislava.

== Life and career ==
Tatiana (Táňa) Pauhofová studied Acting at Academy of Performing Arts in Bratislava. She was chosen among the 'Shooting Stars' of European Film Promotion in 2007.

Beside her roles in films and series in Slovakia and the Czech Republic, she has worked as a theater comedian and also in dubbing and commercials. As an actress she is perhaps best known for her roles in Kruté radosti (2002), Nezné vlny (2013) and Kousek nebe (2005). In 2016 she played the leading role of Lída Baarová in The Devil's Mistress, a film that circulated worldwide through Netflix.

Between 2007 and 2025 she was a resident actress at the Slovak National Theatre.

== Personal life ==
From 2003 to 2011, Pauhofová was in a relationship with the actor Tomáš Maštalír. Pauhofová is married to musician Jonathán Pastirčák. Their daughter Míla was born in 2022.

== Filmography ==
- "Škriatok" (1995) TV series
- Hu-hu bratia (1995) (TV)
- Vater wider Willen (1995) (TV)
- Caro múdrosti a lásky (1997)
- Len treba chciet (1997)
- Kruté radosti (2002) - Valentina
- Pokrevní vztahy (2003) - Marienka
- Cert ví proc (2003) - Princess Anna
- Trampoty vodníka Jakoubka (2004) (TV)
- Siegfried (2004)
- Indián a sestricka (2005) - Kajovka
- Kousek nebe (2005) - Dana
- "Poslední sezóna" (2006) TV series
- Polcas rozpadu (2007) (TV)
- Tri životy (2007) (TV)
- BrainStorm (2008) (TV)
- Muzika (2008)
- "Soukromé pasti" (2008) TV series - Season 1/Episode 10
- Ženy môjho muža (2009)
- Zlatá voci (2009) (TV)
- Vlna (2009) TV mini-series
- Smog (2009)
- "Obchod so štastím" (2009) TV series
- Chut leta (2009) (TV film)
- Fabrika smrti: mladá krv (2009)
- 3 Seasons in Hell (2009) - Hana
- Janosik: A True Story (2009) - Anusia
- Terapie (2011) - Sandra
- Burning Bush (2013) - Dagmar Burešova
- The Devil's Mistress (2016) - Lída Baarová
- Po čem muži touží (2018) - Leona
- The Last Aristocrat (2019) - Jess
- The Sleepers (2019) - Marie Skálová
- Waves (2024) - Věra Šťovíčková-Heroldová

== Theatre ==
=== Summer Shakespeare Festival, Prague ===
- A Midsummer Night's Dream .... Puk (Premiere 27/7/2009 - Lichtenstein Palace)

=== The Drama Play (SND), Bratislava ===
- Anna Karenina .... Kitty
- Matka Guráž a jej děti .... Kathrin, her mute daughter (Bertolt Brecht, Paul Dessau)
- Plantáž .... Sandra
- Intrigue and Love .... Luise, her daughter
- Three Sisters .... Irina
- A Midsummer Night's Dream
- Manon Lescaut
- Irena Hrováthová: Fetišistky .... Michaela, Maryla's daughter
- The Cripple of Inishmaan
- Othello
- Kocúr na kolieskových korčuliach .... Rebeka Rybková
