= The Third Miracle =

- Theatrical release poster
- Directed by: Agnieszka Holland
- Written by: Richard Vetere; John Romano
- Produced by: Fred Fuchs; Steven Haft; Elie Samaha
- Starring: Ed Harris; Anne Heche; Armin Mueller-Stahl; Charles Haid; Michael Rispoli; Barbara Sukowa
- Cinematography: Jerzy Zieliński
- Edited by: David Siegel
- Music by: Jan A.P. Kaczmarek
- Production companies: American Zoetrope; Franchise Pictures
- Distributed by: Sony Pictures Classics
- Release dates: September 13, 1999 (TIFF); December 29, 1999 (United States)
- Running time: 119 minutes
- Country: United States
- Language: English
- Box office: $591,142

The Third Miracle is a 1999 drama film directed by Agnieszka Holland and starring Ed Harris and Anne Heche. The film was shot in Hamilton, Ontario, Canada and Banská Štiavnica, Slovakia.

== Plot ==
In Bystrica, Slovakia in 1944, near the end of World War II, an Allied bombing raid causes a tiny girl to pray for deliverance.

In Chicago, in 1979, Father Frank Shore (Ed Harris) is a priest, now a Postulator, who investigates claims of miracles for the Vatican performed by a devout woman whose death caused a statue of the Virgin Mary to bleed upon and cure a girl with terminal lupus. Now the woman has been nominated for sainthood.

Having never encountered a genuine miracle, he is known as the "Miracle Killer" for his track record for debunking false claims of miracles. Father Frank is suffering a crisis of faith when he is sent to investigate the miracles of a woman, the late Helen O'Regan who has been nominated for sainthood, and winds up becoming the greatest advocate for her canonization.

Father Frank uncovers a series of extraordinary events but the most extraordinary thing of all may be the "saint's" very earthly daughter, Roxanne (Anne Heche). Roxanne is a non-believer who cannot forgive her otherwise selfless mother for abandoning her at the age of 16.

== Cast ==
- Ed Harris as Father Frank Shore
- Anne Heche as Roxanne
- Armin Mueller-Stahl as Werner
- Michael Rispoli as John Leone
- Charles Haid as Bishop Cahill
- Barbara Sukowa as Helen

== Soundtrack ==
The soundtrack to The Third Miracle was released on December 14, 1999.

No.	Title	Artist	Length
1.	"Interrupted Dream: Opening Titles"	Jan A.P. Kaczmarek	1:33
2.	"Bystricia At War"	Jan A.P. Kaczmarek	2:51
3.	"First Prayer"	Jan A.P. Kaczmarek	2:18
4.	"Frank and Roxanne"	Jan A.P. Kaczmarek	3:33
5.	"Before Your Eyes"	Jan A.P. Kaczmarek	2:53
6.	"Prayer At The Lake"	Jan A.P. Kaczmarek	1:27
7.	"Falcone"	Jan A.P. Kaczmarek	1:49
8.	"Domine Jesu"	Jan A.P. Kaczmarek	1:11
9.	"Call From Bystricia"	Jan A.P. Kaczmarek	2:12
10.	"Helen O'Reagan"	Jan A.P. Kaczmarek	2:49
11.	"They Call You A Miracle Killer"	Jan A.P. Kaczmarek	0:43
12.	"Meeting In The Hospital"	Jan A.P. Kaczmarek	2:59
13.	"Ordinary Woman"	Jan A.P. Kaczmarek	2:18
14.	"Maria In The Hospital"	Jan A.P. Kaczmarek	2:34
15.	"I Wanted It To Be True"	Jan A.P. Kaczmarek	2:15
16.	"The Confession"	Jan A.P. Kaczmarek	1:57
17.	"Unfinished Love Story"	Jan A.P. Kaczmarek	2:55
18.	"Farewell"	Jan A.P. Kaczmarek	1:09
19.	"Memories From The Lake"	Jan A.P. Kaczmarek	2:22
20.	"The Bleeding Statue"	Jan A.P. Kaczmarek	4:49
21.	"The Third Miracle"	Jan A.P. Kaczmarek	3:20
Total length:			49:57

== Reception ==
=== Critical response ===
The Third Miracle has an approval rating of 68% on review aggregator website Rotten Tomatoes, based on 34 reviews, and an average rating of 6.1/10. Metacritic assigned the film a weighted average score of 55 out of 100, based on 23 critics, indicating "mixed or average reviews".
