= General Inspection of Security Forces =

General Inspectorate of Security Forces
- Generální inspekce bezpečnostních sborů
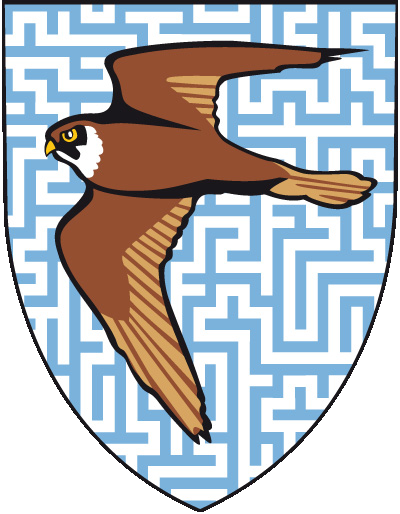

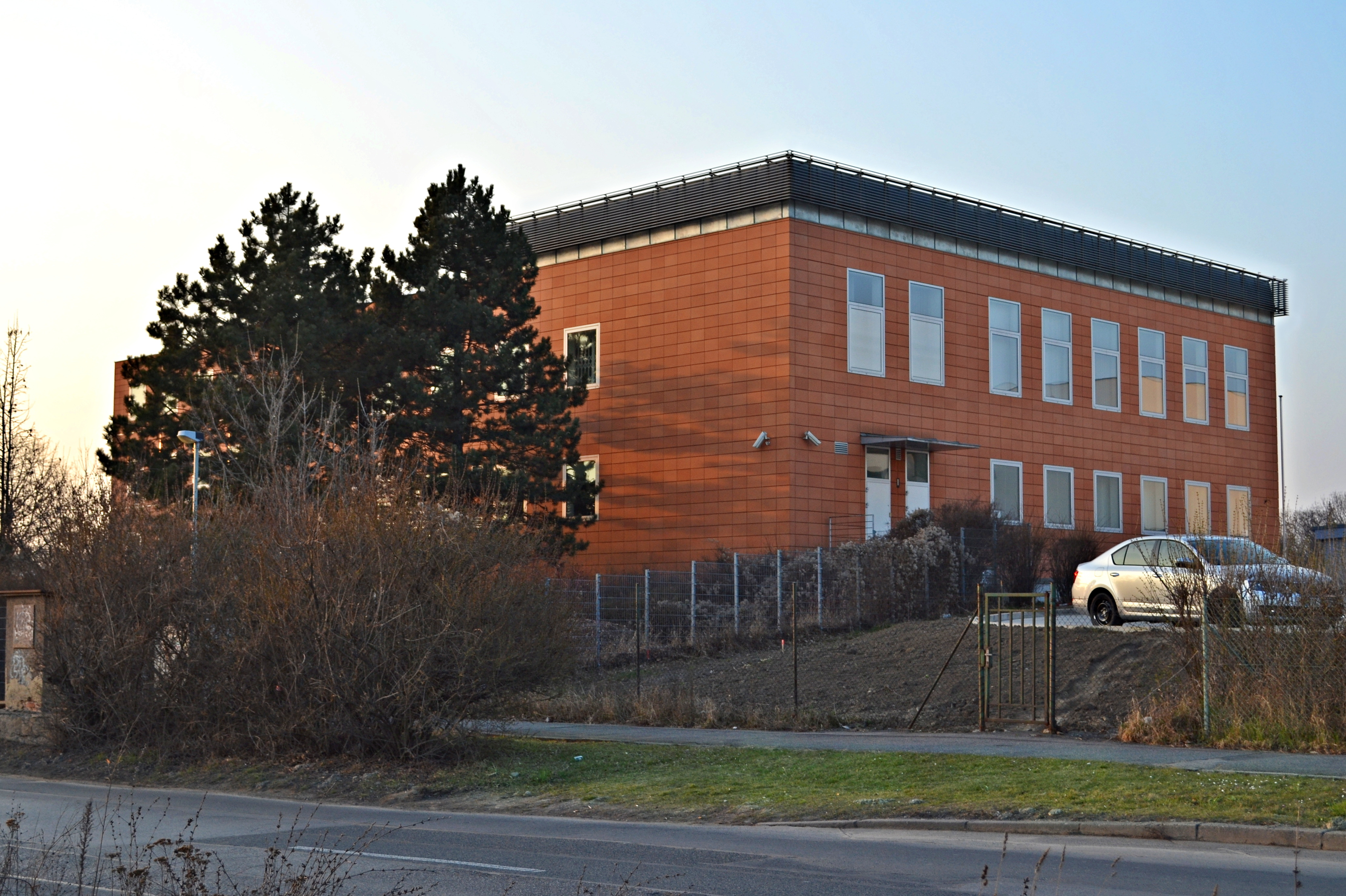
- Head office of the General Inspectorate of Security Forces in Prague

Agency overview
- Formed: June 29, 2011; 15 years ago
- Superseding agency: Inspectorate of the Police of the Czech Republic
- Jurisdiction: Czech Republic
- Headquarters: Prague, Czech Republic; 50°4′46.81″N 14°22′29.16″E
- Employees: 275 (2013)
- Agency executive: Vít Hendrych, Director
- Website: www.GIBS.cz

The General Inspectorate of Security Forces (GIBS) (The Inspectorate General of the Security Forces of the Czech Republic; Czech: Generální inspekce bezpečnostních sborů) is a Czech independent government agency tasked with investigating crimes of the officers of the Police of the Czech Republic, Customs protection, Prison Service, inspection workers or civil employees of these institutions.

== History ==
In 2010, the Věci veřejné political party demanded the resignation of then police president Oldřich Martinů. Former VV's Minister of the Interior Radek John also called for a new police president. The argument was settled after then President of the Czech Republic Václav Klaus formulated an agreement between the Police of the Czech Republic, the ODS and the VV. It was stipulated that the VV would choose a new police president while the ODS would appoint the director of the newly formed GIBS.

== List of directors ==
- Colonel Ivan Bílek (1 January 2012 – 30 November 2015)
- Colonel Michal Murín (December 7, 2015 – April 30, 2018)
- Brigadier General Radim Dragoun (September 1, 2018 – August 31, 2023)
- Major General Vít Hendrych (since 7 September 2023)
