= Vojtěch Dyk =

Czech singer and actor

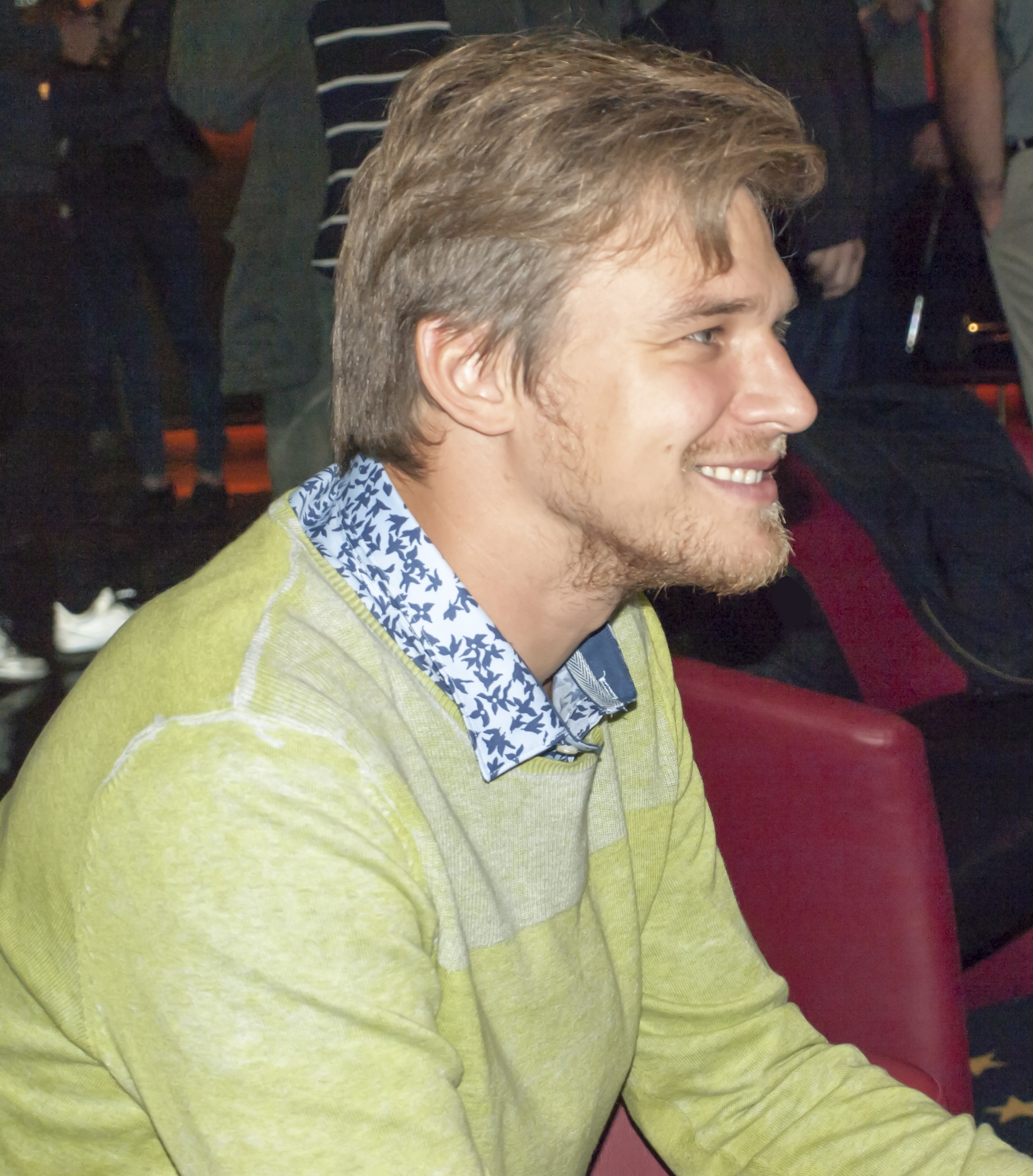
- Vojtěch Dyk (2015)
- Born: 23 July 1985 (age 41); Prague, Czechoslovakia
- Occupations: Actor, singer
- Years active: 1992–present
- Spouse: Tatiana Dyková (m. 2019)

Vojtěch Dyk (born 23 July 1985, in Prague) is a Czech actor and singer. The son of the literary critic Radko Pytlík, as a singer he is known for being frontman of musical groups Nightwork and Tros Discotequos.

== Selected filmography ==
=== Films ===
- Ženy v pokušení (2010)
- Micimutr (2011)
- Revival (2013)
- Tři bratři (2014)
- Anděl Páně 2 (2016)
- Na střeše (2019)
- Il Boemo (2022)

=== TV series ===
- Letiště (2006 - 2007)
- Velmi křehké vztahy (2007)
- Panelák (2008)
- Ďáblova lest (2009)
- Dokonalý svět (2010)
- Terapie (2019)
- Inspekce (2026)

== Discography ==
=== Studio albums ===
- Vojta Dyk a B-Side Band (2014)
- D.Y.K. (2019)

== Awards ==
	Award	Year	Category
Won	Anděl Awards	2012	Best Male Singer

	Award	Year	Operetta, musical	Role	Choreographer
Won	Thalia Awards	2018	Legenda jménem Holmes	Sherlock Holmes / Sir Arthur Conan Doyle	Karen Sieber
