= Magdalena Łazarkiewicz =

Polish film director and screenwriter

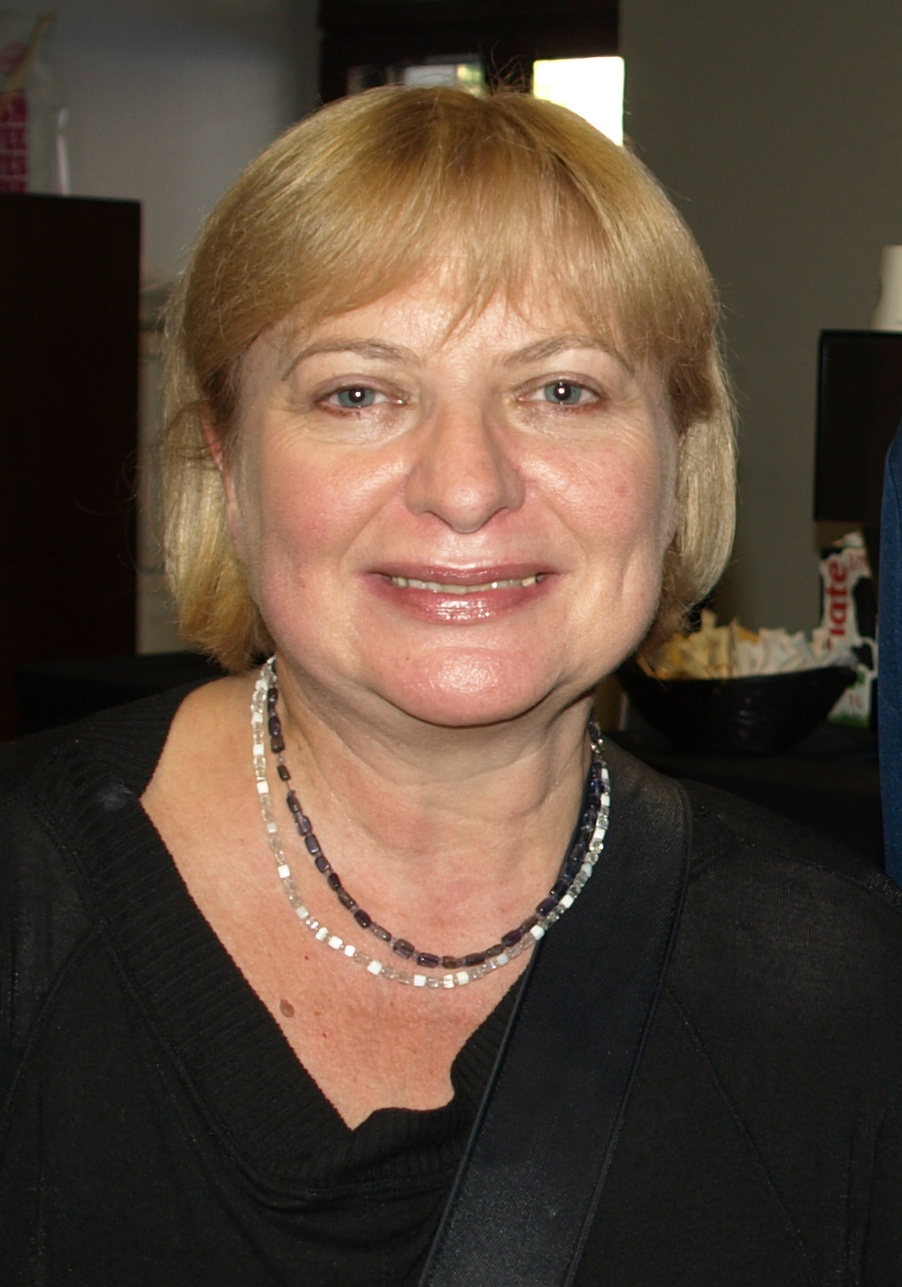
- Magdalena Łazarkiewicz
- Born: Magdalena Holland; June 6, 1954 (age 71); Warsaw, Poland
- Occupations: Film director, screenwriter
- Years active: 1979 – present

Magdalena Łazarkiewicz, née Holland (born 6 July 1954) is a Polish film director and screenwriter.

== Life and career ==
Magdalena Łazarkiewicz was born on 6 July 1954 in Warsaw as a daughter of Polish communist politician Henryk Holland, who was of Jewish origins and his wife, Polish Catholic journalist Irena Rybczyńska-Holland. Łazarkiewicz graduated in cultural studies from the University of Wrocław and radio and television studies from the University of Silesia in Katowice.

== Personal life ==
She is the sister of Polish film director Agnieszka Holland and an aunt of storyboard artist Katarzyna Adamik. Magdalena Łazarkiewicz was married to director Piotr Łazarkiewicz until he died in 2008. They have two children.

== Selected filmography ==
- 2011 – Głęboka Woda (TV series)
- 2010 – Maraton Tańca (Dance Marathon)
- 2006–2007 – Ekipa (TV series)
- 2004 – Dwóch i pół (TV series) S02E13
- 2001–2002 – Marzenia do spełnienia (TV series)
- 1999 – Na koniec świata (The End of the World)
- 1997 – Drugi brzeg
- 1995 – Odjazd (Departure) - TV series co-directed with Piotr Łazarkiewicz
- 1992 – Białe małżeństwo (White Marriage)
- 1991 – Odjazd (Departure) - co-directed with Piotr Łazarkiewicz
- 1989 – Ostatni dzwonek (The Last Schoolbell)
- 1985 – Przez dotyk (By Touch)
