= Miroslav Krobot =

Czech actor

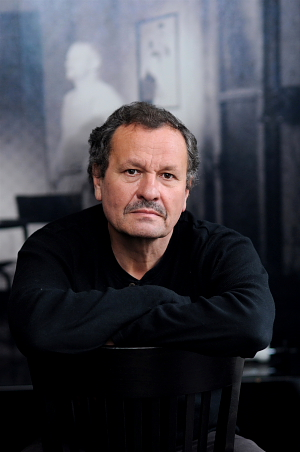
- Born: 12 November 1951 (age 74); Šumperk, Czechoslovakia
- Occupations: Theatre director Actor
- Years active: Theatre director: 1982–present Actor: 2005–present

Miroslav Krobot (born 12 November 1951) is a Czech theatre director and actor. He starred in the film The Man from London, which was entered into the 2007 Cannes Film Festival.

His daughter Lenka Krobotová is also an actress.

== Selected filmography ==
- Wrong Side Up (2005)
- The Man from London (2007)
- 3 Seasons in Hell (2009)
- Alois Nebel (2011)
- The House (2011)
- Leaving (2011)
- In the Shadow (2012)
- Revival (2013)
- Spoor (2017)
