= Shame (2013 film) =

Shame is a Russian language 2013 film about the Kursk Russian submarine disaster. It was directed by Yusup Razykov who is from Uzbekistan. The cast includes Maria Semenova, Elena Korobeynikova, Helga Filipova, and Seseg Hapsasova. The film runtime is 90 minutes.
