= The Krakow Post =

Newspaper based in Kraków, Poland

- Type: Monthly newspaper
- Format: Magazine
- Owner: Lifeboat Limited
- Editor-in-chief: Steven Hoffman
- Founded: 2007; 19 years ago
- Language: English
- Headquarters: Kraków
- Circulation: 50,000
- ISSN: 1898-4762
- Website: krakowpost.com

The Krakow Post is an English-language newspaper based in Kraków, Poland. Owned by Lifeboat Limited since 2008, the monthly newspaper covers local and national news, politics, culture, business, sports, and human interest stories.

== History ==
Founded as a weekly in 2007, the newspaper was then led by Editor-in-Chief Anne Fratczak and Founding Editor Hal Foster, a former Los Angeles Times journalist.

After coming under new ownership in 2008, The Krakow Post was redesigned as a monthly newspaper, with Anna Spysz serving as the editor-in-chief until late 2010.

In January 2011, Jamie Stokes took over her role at the newspaper's helm. Steven Hoffman has been editor-in-chief of the online version since February 2015.

In 2011, The New York Times referred to The Krakow Post and other English-language press in Eastern Europe as having acted as "springboards for a generation of American journalists interested in working in the former East Bloc — though not in the servile role of many local publications."

The Krakow Post came under new management and was relaunched in a magazine format in November 2012.

In May 2021, Giuseppe Sedia launched the website Kino Mania which functions also as an archive of the film reviews on Polish cinema that he penned for The Krakow Post in the previous decade. About 200 film reviews are featured on the website which includes as well a section about Polish School of Posters and the designs created for local film productions.

== Print characteristics ==
Broadsheet format (289 x 390 mm), 32 pages, full color.
