= Jaroslava Pokorná =

Czech actress

- Born: 2 August 1946 (age 79); Prague, Czechoslovakia
- Occupation: Actress
- Years active: 1965-present

Jaroslava Pokorná (born 2 August 1948) is a Czech film and stage actress. She was named Best Actress at the 2005 Alfréd Radok Awards for her role in The Wild Duck at the Divadlo v Dlouhé. She won the Czech Lion award for Best Supporting Actress in 2013 for her role in the mini-series Burning Bush.

== Selected filmography ==
- Boredom in Brno (2003)
- Okresní přebor (television, 2010)
- Burning Bush (2013)
- Charlatan (2020)
- Lover, Not a Fighter (2026)
