= Agnieszka Holland =

Polish film director and screenwriter (born 1948)

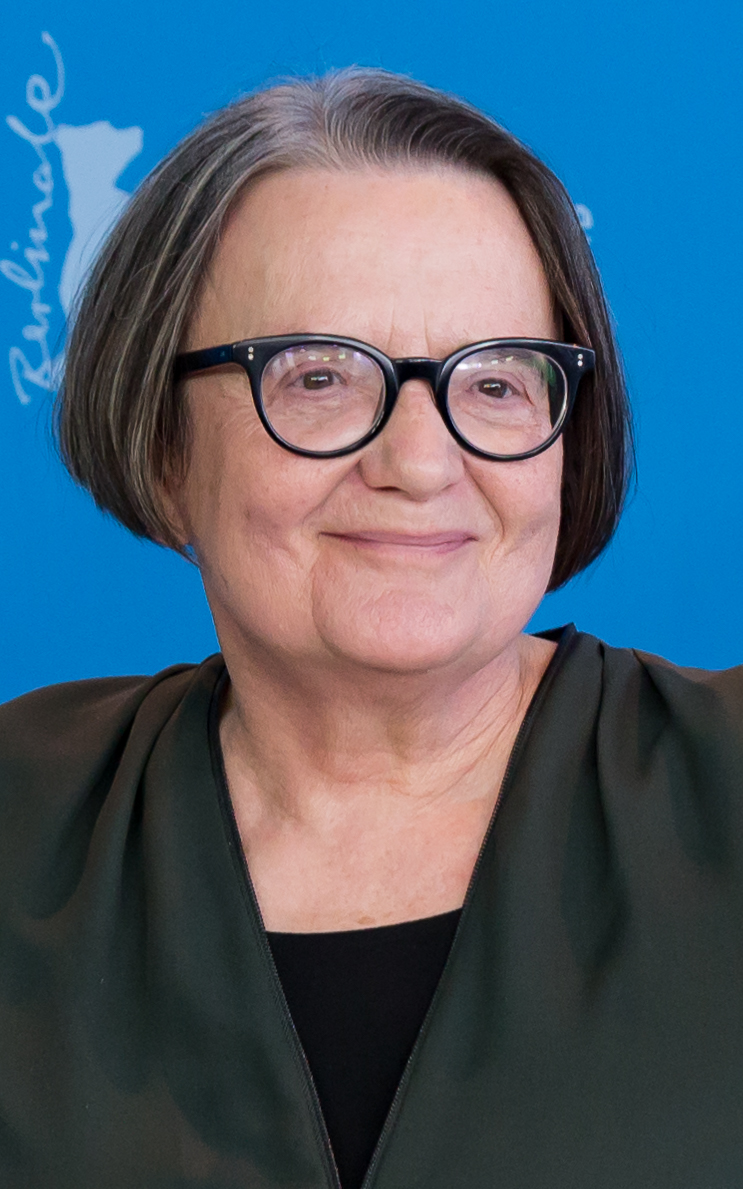
- Holland in 2017
- Born: Agnieszka Holland; 28 November 1948 (age 77); Warsaw, Poland
- Education: Film and TV School of the Academy of Performing Arts in Prague
- Occupations: film and television director, screenwriter
- Years active: 1973–present
- Notable work: Europa Europa (1991); In Darkness (2011); Spoor (2017); Green Border (2023)
- Spouse: Laco Adamík (divorced)
- Children: Kasia Adamik
- Relatives: Magdalena Łazarkiewicz (sister)

Agnieszka Holland (Polish: [aɡˈɲɛʂka ˈxɔlːant]; born 28 November 1948) is a Polish film and television director and screenwriter, best known for her cultural and political contributions to Polish cinema. She began her career as an assistant to directors Krzysztof Zanussi and Andrzej Wajda, and immigrated to France shortly before the 1981 imposition of the martial law in Poland.

Holland is best known for her films Europa Europa (1990), for which she received a Golden Globe Award as well as an Academy Award for Best Adapted Screenplay nomination, The Secret Garden (1993), Angry Harvest and the Holocaust drama In Darkness, the last two of which were nominated for the Academy Award for Best Foreign Language Film. In 2017, she received the Alfred Bauer Prize (Silver Bear) for her film Spoor at the Berlin International Film Festival. She is also a four-time winner of the Grand Prix at the Gdynia Film Festival. In 2020, she was elected President of the European Film Academy. In 2023, her film Green Border won the Special Jury Prize at the Venice International Film Festival.

In her films, Holland often focuses on the individual experiences of people who find themselves on the sidelines of political events. A recurring theme she explores is the critique of Nazi and communist crimes.

== Early life and education ==
Holland was born in Warsaw, Poland, in 1948. She is the daughter of journalists Irena (née Rybczyńska) and Henryk Holland, who had been a prominent Communist activist since 1935 and a captain in the Soviet Army. Holland's mother was Roman Catholic and her father Jewish, but she was not brought up in either faith. Her father, Henryk Holland, lost his parents in a ghetto during the Holocaust, and spent most of his adult life denying his own Jewishness. Holland's father was an ardent Communist journalist whose publications against a number of prominent professors led to their dismissals by the Communist regime. Holland's mother participated in the 1944 Warsaw Uprising as a member of the Polish resistance movement. Holland's Catholic mother aided several Jews during the Holocaust and received the Righteous Among the Nations medal from the Yad Vashem Institute in Israel.

Holland was often ill as a child, and spent much time writing, drawing and directing short plays with other children. When she was eleven, her parents, whose marriage had been continuously contentious, divorced, and her mother soon remarried a Jewish journalist, Stanisław Brodski.

Holland describes her relationship with her father as influential, but very distant. According to her "he was very interesting, very intelligent, and in the last years of his life he gave me a lot of doors to the art and the film. But he wasn't really interested in the young children and he only noticed me when he wanted to make a kind of show". Holland recalls being shown off to her father's friends during late-night gatherings, and then being ignored in the morning when he was no longer entertaining. When she was thirteen, her father died by suicide while under house arrest in Warsaw.

Holland attended the Stefan Batory Gymnasium and Lyceum in Warsaw. After high school, she studied at the Film and TV School of the Academy of Performing Arts in Prague (FAMU) because, as she said in an interview, she thought the Czechoslovak films of the 1960s were very interesting: "I watched first films of Miloš Forman, Ivan Passer, and Věra Chytilová. They seemed to be fantastically interesting to me, unlike what was being made in Poland at that time". At FAMU, she also met her future husband and fellow director, Laco Adamik.

Holland witnessed the Prague Spring of 1968 while in Czechoslovakia, and was arrested for her support of the dissident movement for the government reforms and political liberalization. She describes her time in Prague as her "introduction to politics, violence, beauty, art, marriage, film and other arts...everything that happened to [her] after was based on this Czechoslovak experience". During her imprisonment she spent time in a cell between two inmates who had fallen in love. It became her job to pass erotic notes and messages between them. Holland herself said that "it was like phone sex and I was the cable". During her time in Prague and in prison, she realized "she'd rather be an artist than an agitator". Holland graduated from FAMU in 1971. She returned to Poland, and wrote her first screenplay. Though it was censored and prevented from being developed, it attracted the attention of Andrzej Wajda, who became her mentor. Her daughter with Adamik, Kasia (born 28 December 1972), is also a director.

The events and confusing identities that made up her childhood resulted in Holland being known to have a significant struggle with identity, which manifests itself in many of her most famous films, specifically those related to Polish-Jewish interactions during the Holocaust. According to Holland, the tense relationship between ethnic Jews and Poles is still an ongoing issue. She claims that "Jews from Poland are still hostile to the Polish...There are things in Catholicism and Polish nationalism which are deeply anti-Semitic". Her film Europa, Europa brought her success and recognition in Hollywood, but she has always faced trouble in her career and life due to her past. Holland's "mixed Polish Catholic and Jewish ancestry...places her at the hub of this century's violence". These conflicts and hardships have been the inspiration for films such as Europa, Europa and In Darkness.

== Career ==
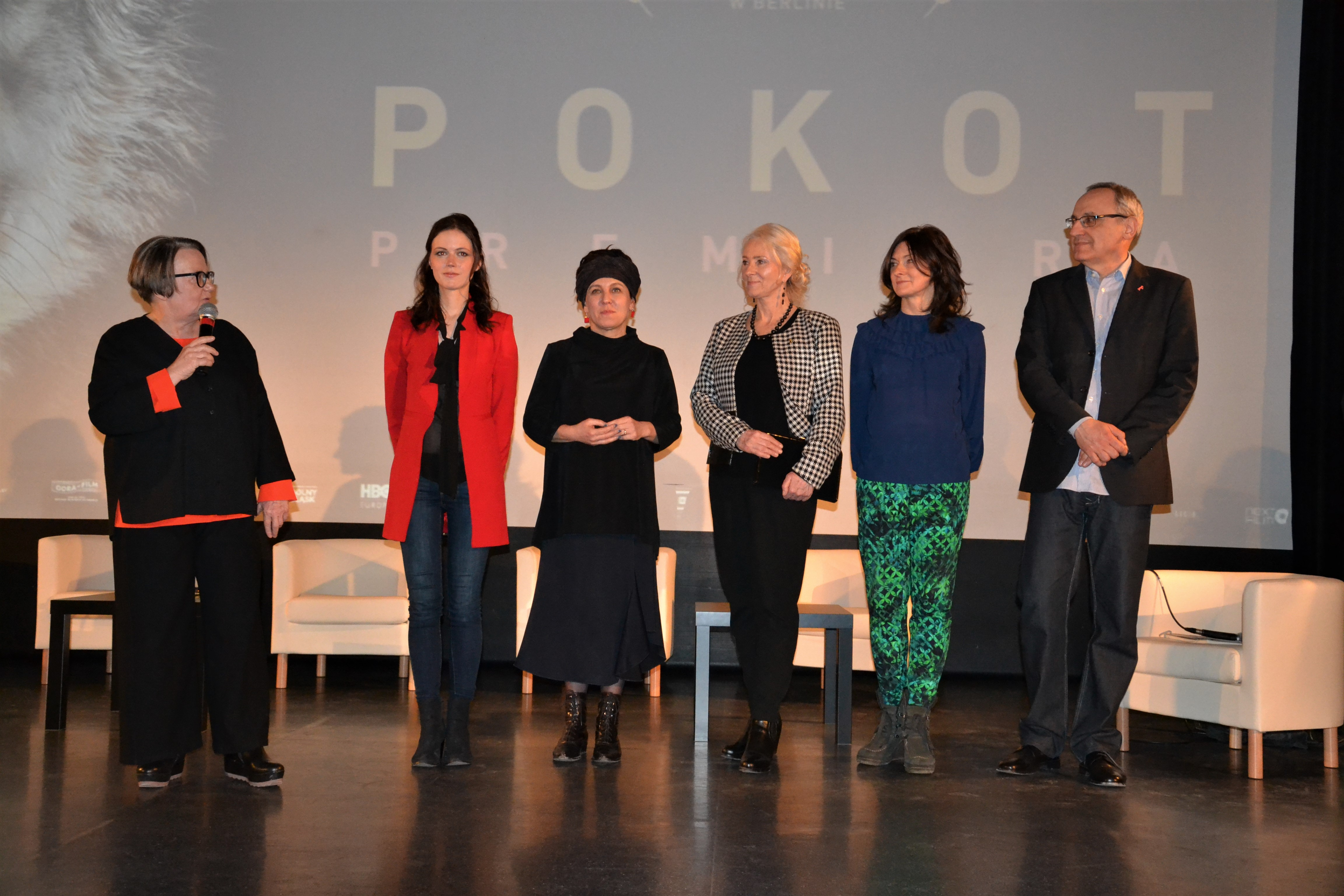
Discussion with Holland at the premiere of Spoor in Nowa Ruda, southwestern Poland

Holland began her career as an assistant director for Polish film directors Krzysztof Zanussi and Andrzej Wajda. Her credits include Zanussi's 1973 film Iluminacja (Illumination), and Wajda's 1983 film Danton. She was first assistant director on Wajda's 1976 Man of Marble, an experience which gave her the capability to explore political and moral issues within the confines of an oppressive regime. Though she had a large role to play in the success of this film, her name was kept off of the credits because of censorship laws. In the first part of her career, owing to censorship by Communist authorities, Holland was unable to release any films under her own name. Wajda offered to adopt her, but she refused, convinced that she could eventually release films under own name. Her first major film was Provincial Actors (Aktorzy Prowincjonalni), a 1978 chronicle of tense backstage relations within a small-town theater company which was an allegory of Poland's contemporary political situation. It won the International Critics Prize at the 1980 Cannes Film Festival.

Holland directed two more major films in Poland, Fever (Gorączka, 1980; entered in the 31st Berlin International Film Festival) and A Lonely Woman (Kobieta samotna) in 1981, before immigrating to France shortly before the December 1981 imposition of martial law in Poland. She was told that she could not return to Poland, and was unable to see or even have any contact with her daughter for over eight months. During this time, though safe, Holland was unable to create any successful films on her own.

Knowing she could not return to communist Poland, Holland wrote scripts for fellow Polish filmmakers: Wajda's Danton, A Love in Germany (1983), The Possessed (1988) and Korczak (1990). She also developed her own projects with Western European production companies, directing Angry Harvest (1985), To Kill a Priest (1988) and Olivier, Olivier (1992). Holland received an Academy Award nomination for Best Foreign Language Film for Angry Harvest, a West German production about a Jewish woman on the run during World War II.

=== Holland's depiction of the Holocaust ===
Some of Holland's most famous work has been her depictions of the Holocaust. These works have been controversial because of Holland's commitment to realism, and the acceptance of all types of individuals both as victims and as flawed human beings deserving of guilt. According to an article written about Holland, her films about the Holocaust "cling to the world as she sees it. A world in which wisdom, if it exists at all, lies in accepting the violence and human frailty in everyone, without exception, including Jewish people". This is most poignant in Holland's 2011 film In Darkness, in which Jewish and Polish Catholic characters are juxtaposed as having some of the same reprehensible qualities as well as redeemable ones.

Holland's best-known film may be Europa Europa (1991), which was based on the life of Solomon Perel (a Jewish teenager who fled Germany for Poland after Kristallnacht in 1938). At the outbreak of World War II and the German invasion of Poland, Perel fled to the Soviet-occupied section of the country. Captured during the German invasion of the USSR in 1941, Solomon convinced a German officer that he was German and found himself enrolled in the Hitler Youth. The film received a lukewarm reception in Germany, and the German Oscar selection committee did not submit it for the 1991 Best Foreign Language Film Oscar. However, it attracted the attention of Michael Barker (who handled Orion Classics' sales at the time). Europa, Europa was released in the United States, winning the 1991 Golden Globe Award for Best Foreign Language Film and an Oscar nomination for best adapted screenplay.

Almost twenty years later, Holland released In Darkness (2011), a German-Canadian-Polish co production that dramatized the story of a Polish sewage worker who aided a group of Jewish refugees by hiding them in the sewers of Lwów during the time when Jewish people in the city were being sent to extermination camps. The story focuses on the relationships between ethnic Poles and Jewish people during the Holocaust. The characters of In Darkness are shown as having some strong similarities, despite the fact that the realities for Jews and ethnic Poles, specifically those depicted in the film, are extremely different. By comparing the Polish protagonist to the Jewish ones, Holland recreates the morally confusing and physically brutal world that though very different for those who were hunted, was everywhere during the Third Reich. This juxtaposition seemed to be a reflection of Holland's own personal experience, specifically her struggle with identity and anti-semitism.

=== Holland and Hollywood ===
Until her successful 1991 film Europa, Europa, Holland was barely recognized as an acclaimed filmmaker in Hollywood. Her chance came about because of a roller coaster ride with the future producer of her American debut Artur Brauner. Holland had been treated to a day at Disneyland by the American Academy when she was in the running as a nominee for a foreign Oscar for her film Angry Harvest. After the difficulty she had getting Angry Harvest made, she had almost decided to give up filmmaking once and for all, but Brauner was convinced that with Europa, Europa he had a perfect project for her. During her trip to Disney, Holland, "against her better judgement decided to ride a roller coaster with her producer. After they stepped off, Holland was shaking with fear as Brauner whipped a contract out of his pocket: "Sign!"". The success of this film brought Holland to the attention of mainstream Hollywood, bringing her the opportunity to direct the film adaptation of the 1911 novel The Secret Garden. This was Holland's first movie made for a major studio with a broad American public in mind. It was a huge change in style for Holland, who was known at the point for her generally dark and pessimistic directorial perspective.

=== Holland's later career ===
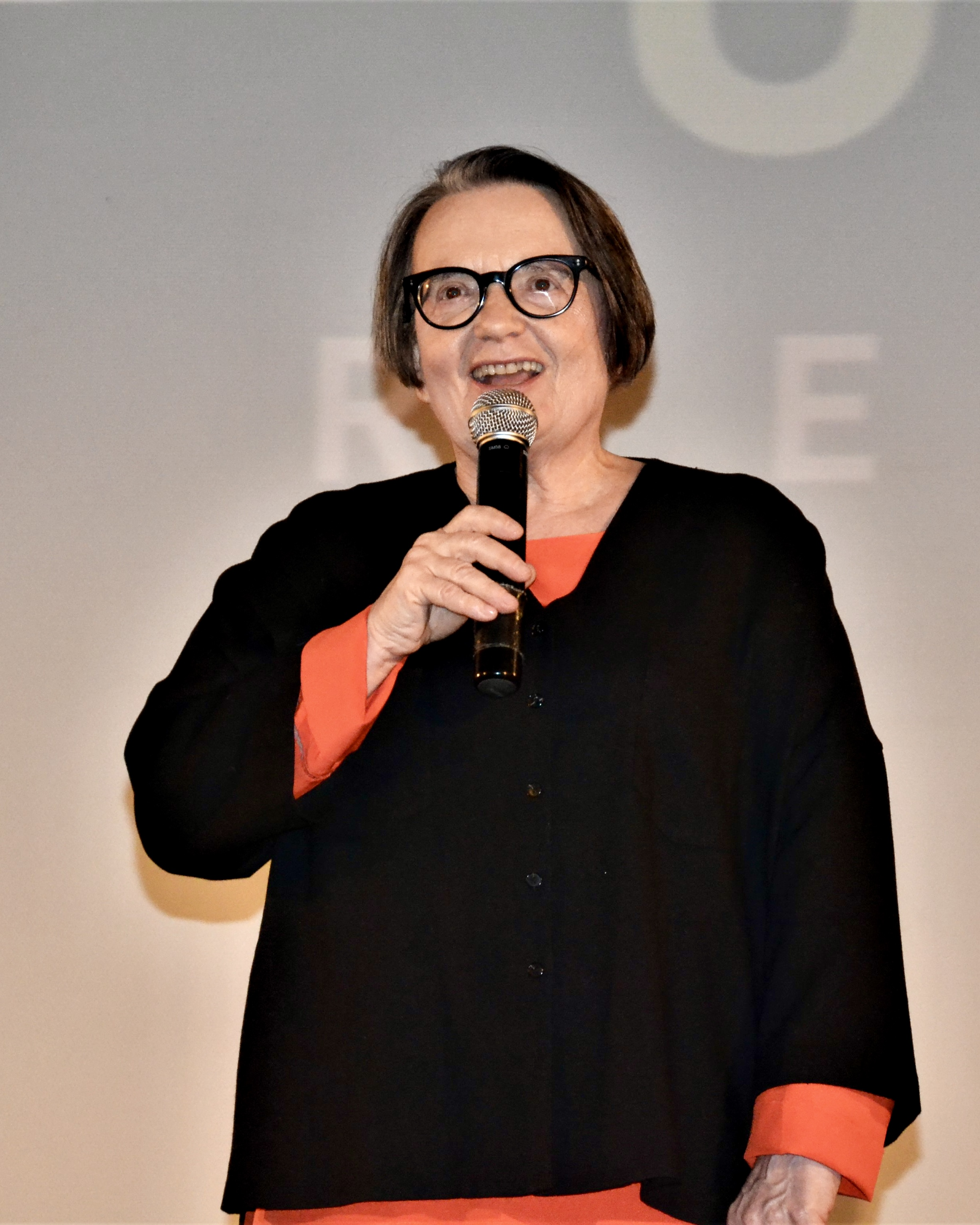
Holland, 2017

A friend of Polish writer and director Krzysztof Kieślowski, Holland collaborated on the screenplay for his film, Three Colors: Blue. Like Kieślowski, Holland frequently examines issues of faith in her work. Much of her film work has a strong political slant. Government reprisals, stifling bureaucratic machinery, sanctioned strikes and dysfunctional families are represented in her early work. In a 1988 interview Holland said that although women were important in her films, feminism was not the central theme of her work. She suggested that when she was making films in Poland under the Communist regime, there was an atmosphere of cross-gender solidarity against censorship (the main political issue). Holland said that she was interested in happenings between people, not the politics occurring outside them; in this context, "maybe you could say that all my movies are political."

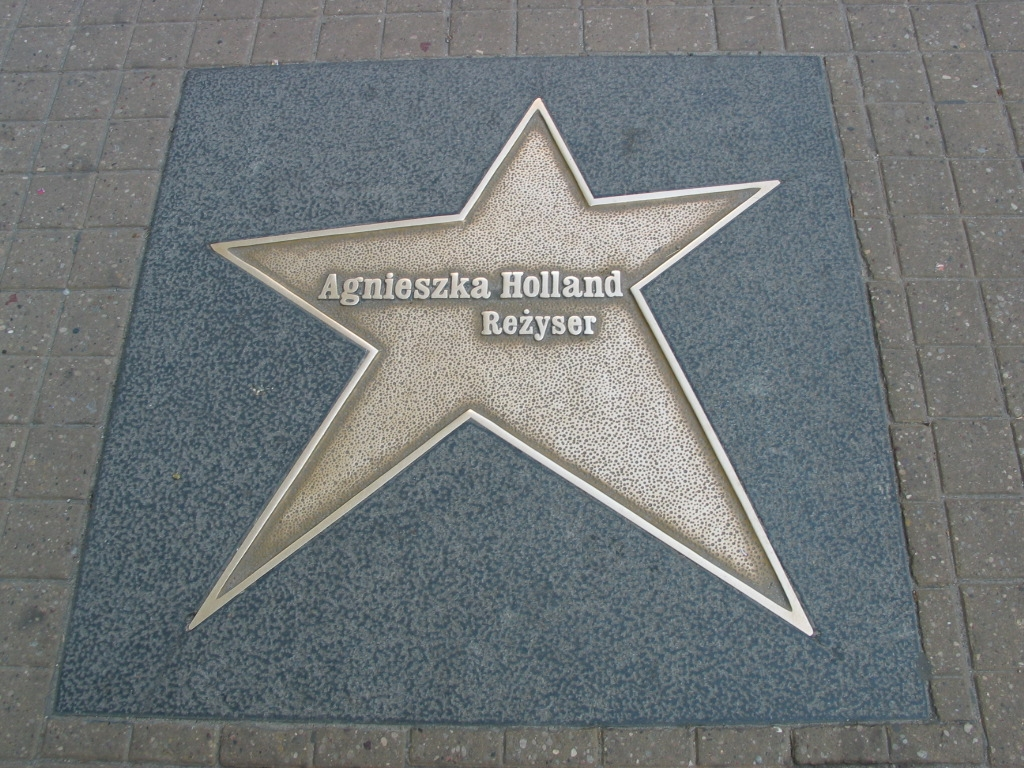
Star to honor Holland in Łódź

Holland's later films include Olivier, Olivier (1992), The Secret Garden (1993), Total Eclipse (1995), Washington Square (1997), the HBO production Shot in the Heart (2001), Julie Walking Home (2001), and Copying Beethoven (2006).

In a 1997 interview, when asked how her experiences as a director have influenced her films, Holland said "filmmakers of the younger generation lack life experience" and, as a result, lack many of the tools needed to breathe humanity into their characters. Compared to directors of her generation, she feels that the younger generation comes from wealthy families, goes straight to film schools and watches movies primarily on videotape. Holland suggests that this results in what she calls a "numbness" and "conventionalization" of contemporary cinema.

In 2003, Holland was a member of the jury at the 25th Moscow International Film Festival. The following year she directed "Moral Midgetry", the eighth episode of the third season of the HBO drama series The Wire. In 2006, Holland returned to direct the eighth episode of the fourth season ("Corner Boys"). Both were written by novelist Richard Price. Show runner David Simon said that Holland was "wonderful behind the camera" and staged the fight between Avon Barksdale and Stringer Bell in "Moral Midgetry" well.

In 2007 Holland, her sister Magdalena Łazarkiewicz and her daughter Katarzyna Adamik directed the Polish political drama series Ekipa, and in 2008 Holland became the first president of the Polish Film Academy. On 5 February 2009, the Krakow Post reported that Holland would direct a biopic about Krystyna Skarbek entitled Christine: War My Love.

Her 2011 film, In Darkness, was selected as the Polish entry for the Best Foreign Language Film at the 84th Academy Awards. In January 2012, the film was one of the five nominees.

Holland accepted an offer to film a three-part drama for HBO about Jan Palach, who immolated himself in January 1969 to protest "normalization" after the Warsaw Pact invasion of Czechoslovakia in August 1968. The resulting miniseries, Burning Bush, has been shown in Poland and Germany and selected for a Special Presentation screening at the 2013 Toronto International Film Festival. She also won the Czech Lion Award in the Best Director category for this TV series.

On 1 December 2013, the film screened at the National Gallery of Art in Washington, DC, where Holland was invited to deliver the Rajiv Vaidya Memorial Lecture: Viewing History through the Filmmaker's Lens. It was also shown at the 2013 Philadelphia Film Festival. Holland was a guest speaker at Brooklyn College.

In December 2013, Holland was announced as director of NBC's next miniseries Rosemary's Baby, a two-part version of the best selling novel by Ira Levin with Zoe Saldaña.

Holland took over the chairmanship of the European Film Academy board in January 2014.

In March 2016, it was announced that Holland was set to direct an adaptation of Peter Swanson's best-selling novel The Kind Worth Killing, a psychological thriller about a ruthless female killer.

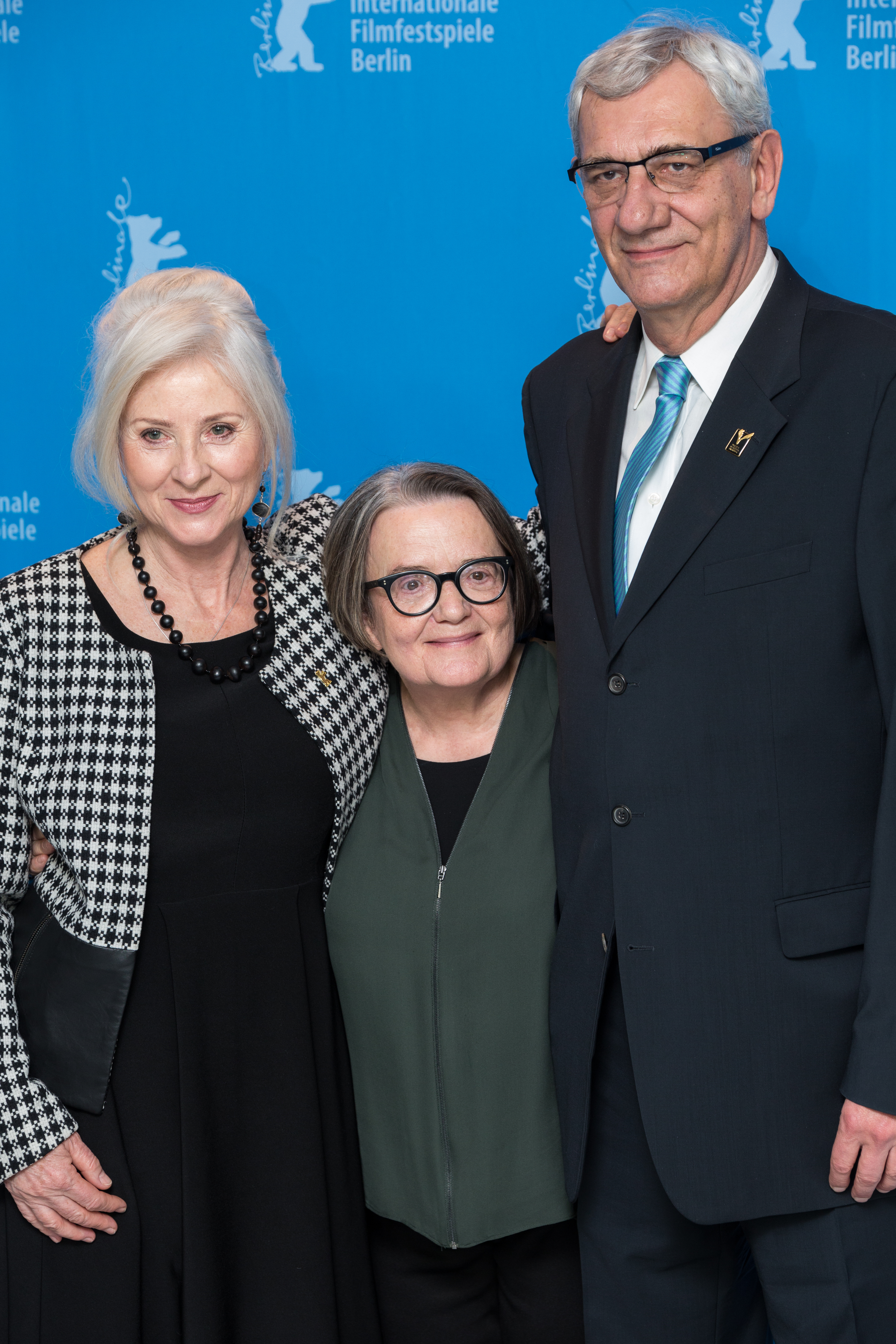
Holland presenting the movie Spoor at the Berlinale 2017

In February 2017, Holland received The Silver Bear Alfred Bauer Prize for Spoor. The award is given to the films that are perceived to open new perspectives in the art of film.

In 2019, she won the Golden Lions Award (Polish: Złote Lwy) at the 44th Gdynia Film Festival for her historical film Mr. Jones, which deals with the subject of the Great Famine in Ukraine. On 23 November 2019, Holland and Anne Applebaum were awarded Orders of Princess Olga, 3rd Class by Ukrainian President Volodymyr Zelenskyy for their efforts in promoting the memory of the Holodomor.

In 2020, her next film Charlatan was selected as the Czech entry for the Best International Feature Film at the 93rd Academy Awards making the February shortlist. The same year, she was honoured with the FIPRESCI Platinum Award at the Sofia International Film Festival.

In 2023, her film Green Border, which portrays the plight of migrants caught in the Belarus–European Union border crisis, premiered at the 80th Venice International Film Festival where it was awarded the Special Jury Prize. The film caused much controversy, and met with strong criticism from Polish government officials, who accused Holland of painting a bad image abroad of Polish border guards. In October 2023, the Los Angeles Film Critics Association selected Holland as the winner of the association's Career Achievement Award stating that "With moral clarity, deep empathy and invigorating filmmaking, her work lays bare the damage that oppressive regimes and sociopolitical conflicts wreak on everyday souls". On 12 October 2023, she was awarded an honorary doctorate from the National Film School in Łódź. In July 2024, she was announced as a jury member at the 81st Venice International Film Festival. On 28 October 2024, Holland was awarded Medal of Merit from the Czech president Petr Pavel for her cultural impact.

In 2025, her Franz Kafka biopic Franz premiered at the 2025 Toronto International Film Festival. It was selected as Poland's submission for Best International Feature Film at the 98th Academy Awards, but it was not nominated.

== Filmography ==
=== Feature films ===
Year	English title	Original title	Notes
1977	Sunday Children	Niedzielne dzieci	TV movie
1977	Screen Tests	Zdjęcia próbne	Co-directed with Jerzy Domaradzki and Pawel Kedzierski
1977	Something for Something	Coś za coś	TV movie
1979	Provincial Actors	Aktorzy prowincjonalni	
1981	Fever	Gorączka	
1982	Postcards from Paris	Les cartes postales de Paris	TV movie
1985	Culture	Kultura	Documentary about Polish magazine 'Culture'
1985	Angry Harvest	Bittere Ernte	Academy Award nominee for Best Foreign Language Film (West Germany)
1987	A Lonely Woman	Kobieta samotna	Filmed in 1981, banned in Poland until 1987
1988	To Kill a Priest		English-language debut
1990	Europa Europa	Hitlerjunge Salomon	Academy Award nominee for Best Adapted Screenplay
1992	Olivier, Olivier		
1993	The Secret Garden		
1995	Total Eclipse		
1997	Washington Square		
1999	The Third Miracle		
2001	Shot in the Heart		TV movie
2002	Julie Walking Home		
2006	Copying Beethoven		
2006	A Girl Like Me: The Gwen Araujo Story		TV movie
2009	Janosik: A True Story	Prawdziwa historia	Co-directed with Kasia Adamik
2011	In Darkness	W ciemności	Academy Award nominee for Best Foreign Language Film (Poland)
2017	Spoor	Pokot	Alfred Bauer Prize at the 67th Berlin International Film Festival
2019	Mr. Jones		
2020	Charlatan	Šarlatán	
2023	Green Border	Zielona granica	Special Jury Prize at the 80th Venice International Film Festival
2025	Franz		
2026	The Rabbit Garden	Králičí zahrada	In production

=== Short films ===
- Jesus Christ's Sin (Grzech Boga, 1970) - Short
- Evening at Abdon's (Wieczór u Abdona, 1975) - TV short film
- Golden Dreams (2001) - Documentary

=== Television ===
- Pictures from Life: A Girl and Aquarius (Obrazki z życia: dziewczyna i "Akwarius", 1975)
- Red Wind (episode of Fallen Angels, 1994)
- Shot in the Heart (2001)
- Cold Case (2004)
- The Wire
  - Episode 3.08 "Moral Midgetry" (2004)
  - Episode 4.08 "Corner Boys" (2006)
  - Episode 5.05 "React Quotes" (2008)
- A Girl Like Me: The Gwen Araujo Story (2006)
- Ekipa (2007)
- The Killing
  - Episode 1.06 "What You Have Left" (2011)
  - Episode 1.09 "Undertow" (2011)
  - Episode 2.01 "Reflections" (2012)
- Treme
  - Episode 1.01 "Do You Know What It Means" (2010)
  - Episode 1.10 "I'll Fly Away" (2010)
  - Episode 2.10 "That's What Lovers Do" (2011)
  - Episode 4.05 "...To Miss New Orleans" (2013)
- Burning Bush (2013)
- Rosemary's Baby (2014)
- House of Cards
  - Episode 3.10 "Chapter 36" (2015)
  - Episode 3.11 "Chapter 37" (2015)
  - Episode 5.10 "Chapter 62" (2017)
- The Affair
  - Episode 3.6 (2015)
- The First
  - Episode 1.01 "Separation" (2018)
  - Episode 1.02 "What's Needed" (2018)

== Other work ==
Holland translated the novel The Unbearable Lightness of Being from Czech to Polish. She volunteered for this task after meeting the author, Milan Kundera, in 1982, and reading the manuscript; both were living in Paris at that time. Holland found the events of the book relatable not only to her personal experience of the Warsaw Pact invasion of Czechoslovakia but also to the strikes of 1980 in Poland, and therefore wanted to introduce the book to the Polish audience. The translation was originally published by the London-based publisher Aneks and has since been widely reprinted.

In 2023, Holland appeared as a guest star in the Polish Netflix series Absolute Beginners.

== See also ==
- List of female film and television directors
- List of LGBT-related films directed by women
- Cinema of Poland
- List of Poles
- List of Polish Academy Award winners and nominees
