= 2021 Czech Lion Awards =

Czech film and TV award ceremony

29th Czech Lion Awards
- Date: 5 March 2022
- Hosted by: Jiří Havelka

Highlights
- Best Picture: Zátopek
- Best Actor: Václav Neužil; Zátopek
- Best Actress: Pavla Gajdošíková; Occupation
- Best Supporting Actor: Oldřich Kaiser; The Man With Hare Ears
- Best Supporting Actress: Antonie Formanová; Occupation
- Most awards: Zátopek (8)
- Most nominations: Occupation and Zátopek (13)

Television coverage
- Network: Česká televize

2021 Czech Lion Awards ceremony was held on 5 March 2022.

== Categories ==
Nominations were announced on 17 January 2022 with Occupation and Zátopek receiving highest number of nominations.

| Best Film | Best Director |
|---|---|
| Zátopek; Bird Atlas; The Man With Hare Ears; Mistakes; Occupation | David Ondříček for Zátopek; Olmo Omerzu for Bird Atlas; Martin Šulík for The Man With Hare Ears; Jan Prušinovský for Mistakes; Michal Nohejl for Occupation |
| Best Actor in a Leading Role | Best Actress in a Leading Role |
| Václav Neužil for Zátopek; Miroslav Donutil for Bird Atlas; Miroslav Krobot for The Man With Hare Ears; Jan Jankovský for Mistakes; Martin Pechlát for Occupation | Pavla Gajdošíková for Mistakes; Alena Mihulová for Bird Atlas; Anna Kameníková for Božena; Eliška Křenková for Two Ships; Martha Issová for Zátopek |
| Best Actor in a Supporting Role | Best Actress in a Supporting Role |
| Oldřich Kaiser for The Man With Hare Ears; Martin Pechlát for Bird Atlas; Hynek Čermák for The Roubal Case; Otakar Brousek jr. for Occupation; Robert Mikluš for Zátopek | Antonie Formanová for Occupation; Eliška Křenková for Bird Atlas; Denisa Barešová for The Swap; Eva Hacurová for Mistakes; Zuzana Mauréry for The Man With Hare Ears |
| Best Screenplay | Best Editing |
| Occupation; The Man With Hare Ears; Mistakes; My Sunny Maad; Zátopek | Zátopek; At Full Throttle; Bird Atlas; Mistakes; Occupation |
| Best Cinematography | Stage Design |
| Zátopek; Bird Atlas; Blood Kin; The Man With Hare Ears; Occupation | Zátopek; Božena; Kryštof; The Man With Hare Ears; Occupation |
| Makeup and Hairstyling | Costume Design |
| Zátopek; Božena; The Man With Hare Ears; Mistakes; Occupation | Božena; The Crimes of Greater Prague; The Man With Hare Ears; Occupation; Zátopek |
| Music | Sound |
| Occupation; Amerikánka; Even Mice Belong in Heaven; My Sunny Maad; Zátopek | Zátopek; Bird Atlas; The Man With Hare Ears; My Sunny Maad; Occupation |
| Extraordinary audiovisual achievement | Best Documentary |
| | Intensive Life Unit; At Full Throttle; Dreams About Stray Cat; Heaven; A New Shift |
| Best Animated Film | Best Short Film |
| Even Mice Belong in Heaven; My Sunny Maad; Red Shoes | Love, Dad; The Glory of Terrible Eliz; The Last Day of Patriarchy |
| Best Television Film or Miniseries | Best TV Series |
| Božena; Amerikánka; The Roubal Case | The Defender; The Crimes of Greater Prague; The Swap |
Unique Contribution to Czech Film
Ivo Špajl

=== Non-statutory Awards ===
| Best Film Poster | Film Fans Award |
|---|---|
| Zátopek; Bird Atlas; My Sunny Maad; Occupation; Wolves at the Borders | Nineties |
Magnesie Award for Best Student Film
Love, Dad; Dřevo na příští zimu; Red Shoes; Postup práce; Still Awake?
