= Czech Film Critics' Award for Best Actress =

- Country: Czech Republic
- First award: 2014
- Currently held by: Kateřina Falbrová
- Website: filmovakritika.cz

Czech Film Critics' Award for Best Actress is one of the awards given to the best Czech motion picture.

== Winners ==
Year	Actor	Film title (English)	Film title (Original)
2014	Klaudia Dudová	Way Out	Cesta ven
2015	Alena Mihulová	Home Care	Domácí péče
2016	Michalina Olszańska	I, Olga Hepnarová	Já, Olga Hepnarová
2017	Zuzana Kronerová	Ice Mother	Bába z ledu
2018	Jenovéfa Boková	Moments	Chvilky
2019	Tereza Ramba	Owners	Vlastníci
2020	Magdaléna Borová	Shadow Country	Krajina ve stínu
2021	Pavla Gajdošíková	Mistakes	Chyby
2022	Vita Smačeljuk	Victim	Oběť
2023	Simona Peková	She Came at Night	Přišla v noci
2024	Pavla Beretová	Year of the Widow	Rok vdovy
2025	Kateřina Falbrová	Broken Voices	Sbormistr
