= Father (2025 film) =

2025 film by Tereza Nvotová

- International poster
- Slovak: Otec
- Directed by: Tereza Nvotová
- Written by: Tereza Nvotová; Dušan Budzak
- Produced by: Veronika Paštéková; Anton Škreko
- Starring: Milan Ondrík; Dominika Morávková
- Cinematography: Adam Suzin
- Edited by: Nikodem Chabior
- Music by: Pjoni
- Production company: DANAE Production
- Release date: 28 August 2025 (Venice)
- Running time: 102 minutes
- Countries: Slovakia; Czech Republic; Poland
- Language: Slovak

Father (Slovak: Otec) is a 2025 Slovak-language psychological drama film directed by Tereza Nvotová, co-written by Nvotová and Dušan Budzak. Starring Milan Ondrík and Dominika Morávková, it follows a father who experiences forgotten baby syndrome.

The film had its world premiere in the Orizzonti section of the 82nd Venice International Film Festival on 28 August 2025. It was selected as the Slovak entry for the Best International Feature Film at the 98th Academy Awards, but it was not nominated.

== Premise ==
Father follows the life of a man after he experiences forgotten baby syndrome, unintentionally leaving his infant daughter in the back seat of his car.

== Cast ==
- Milan Ondrík as Michal
- Dominika Morávková as Zuzka
- Dominika Zajcz
- Martina Sľúková
- Aňa Geislerová
- Peter Ondrejička
- Peter Bebjak
- Ingrid Timková
- Roman Polák

== Production ==
In January 2021, the project took part in the When East Meets West co-production forum during the Trieste Film Festival. In October 2021, it was featured at Industry@Tallinn and Baltic Event as part of the Tallinn Black Nights Film Festival. In June 2022, it joined the Sofia Meetings, held in conjunction with the Sofia International Film Festival. It won the Screen International Award at the C EU Soon program at the MIA Market in October 2024.

Principal photography took place in Bratislava in January and June 2024. It was filmed in one-shot by cinematographer Adam Suzin.

== Release ==
Father had its world premiere at the 82nd Venice International Film Festival at the Orizzonti section. The film opened the 20th International Film Festival Cinematik on 10 September 2025.

The film won the Bronze Horse for Best Film at the Stockholm International Film Festival.

In July 2025, Intramovies acquired the film's international sales. The film released in cinemas in Slovakia on 11 September 2025, followed by a release in the Czech Republic a week later, both distributed by CinemArt.

== Accolades ==
Award / Festival	Date of ceremony	Category	Recipient(s)	Result	Ref.
Stockholm International Film Festival	14 November 2025	Bronze Horse Best Film	Father	Won	
Stockholm International Film Festival	14 November 2025	Best Screenplay	Tereza Nvotová and Dušan Budzak	Won	
Camerimage Film Festival	22 November 2025	Cinematographer's Debuts Competition	Adam Suzin	Won	
Palm Springs International Film Festival	11 January 2026	FIPRESCI Prize for Best Actor in an International Feature	Milan Ondrík	Won	
Czech Film Critics' Awards	7 February 2026	Best Film	Veronika Paštéková, Anton Škreko, Karel Chvojka, Miloš Lochman, Marta Gmosińska, and Mariusz Włodarski	Nominated	
Czech Film Critics' Awards	7 February 2026	Best Director	Tereza Nvotová	Won	
Czech Film Critics' Awards	7 February 2026	Best Screenplay	Tereza Nvotová and Dušan Budzak	Nominated	
Czech Film Critics' Awards	7 February 2026	Best Actor	Milan Ondrík	Won	
Czech Film Critics' Awards	7 February 2026	Best Actress	Dominika Morávková	Nominated	
Czech Film Critics' Awards	7 February 2026	Best Audiovisual Work	Adam Suzin	Nominated	
Sun in a Net Awards	9 April 2026	Best Feature Film	Tereza Nvotová	Won	
Sun in a Net Awards	9 April 2026	Best Director	Tereza Nvotová	Won	
Sun in a Net Awards	9 April 2026	Best Actress	Dominika Morávková	Nominated	
Sun in a Net Awards	9 April 2026	Best Actor	Milan Ondrík	Won	
Sun in a Net Awards	9 April 2026	Best Screenplay	Dušan Budzak and Tereza Nvotová	Nominated	
Sun in a Net Awards	9 April 2026	Best Cinematography	Adam Suzin	Won	
Sun in a Net Awards	9 April 2026	Best Editing	Nikodem Chabior	Nominated	
Sun in a Net Awards	9 April 2026	Best Sound	Ivan Horák and Marek Hart	Nominated	
Sun in a Net Awards	9 April 2026	Best Score	Jonatán (Pjoni) Pastirčák	Won	

== See also ==
- List of submissions to the 98th Academy Awards for Best International Feature Film
- List of Slovak submissions for the Academy Award for Best International Feature Film
