= Czech Film Critics' Award for Best Director =

- Country: Czech Republic
- First award: 2010
- Currently held by: Tereza Nvotová
- Website: filmovakritika.cz

Czech Film Critics' Award for Best Director is one of the awards given to the best Czech motion picture.

== Winners ==
Year	Director	Film title (English)	Film title (Original)
2010	Radim Špaček (1)	Walking Too Fast	Pouta
2011	Robert Sedláček (1)	Long Live the Family!	Rodina je základ státu
2012	David Ondříček (1)	In the Shadow	Ve stínu
2013	Agnieszka Holland (1)	Burning Bush	Hořící keř
2014	Petr Václav (1)	The Way Out	Cesta ven
2015	Petr Zelenka (1)	Lost in Munich	Ztraceni v Mnichově
2016	Tomáš Weinreb, Petr Kazda (1)	I, Olga Hepnarová	Já, Olga Hepnarová
2017	Václav Kadrnka (1)	Little Crusader	Křižáček
2018	Olmo Omerzu (1)	Winter Flies	Všechno bude
2019	Martin Dušek, Ondřej Provazník (1)	Old-Timers	Staříci
2020	Agnieszka Holland (2)	Charlatan	Šarlatán
2021	Michal Nohejl (1)	Occupation	Okupace
2022	Adam Sedlák (1)	BANGER.	BANGER.
2023	Jan Vejnar, Tomáš Pavlíček (1)	She Came at Night	Přišla v noci
2024	Viktor Tauš (1)	Girl America	Amerikánka
2025	Tereza Nvotová (1)	Father	Otec
