= Diana Nguyen =

Diana Nguyen may refer to:

- Diana Cam Van Nguyen, Czech-Vietnamese animated filmmaker
- Diana Khoi Nguyen, American poet and multimedia artist
