= 35th European Film Awards =

2022 film awards ceremony in Iceland

- Harpa Conference and Concert Hall, venue of the 35th European Film Awards
- Date: 10 December 2022
- Site: Harpa Conference and Concert Hall, Reykjavík, Iceland
- Organized by: European Film Academy
- Official website: EFA

The 35th European Film Awards, presented by the European Film Academy to recognize achievements in European filmmaking, took place at the Harpa Conference and Concert Hall in Reykjavík, Iceland on 10 December 2022. According to the academy, films eligible for the awards are those that had their first official screening between 1 June 2021 and 31 May 2022 and have a European director.

German actress, director and screenwriter Margarethe von Trotta received the Lifetime Achievement Award while Palestinian actor and director Elia Suleiman was honoured with the Achievement in World Cinema Award.

== Selection ==
=== Feature Film ===
Selection's part 1 was announced on 18 August 2022.

- Aftersun – Charlotte Wells (UK)
- Alcarràs – Carla Simón (Spain / Italy)
- All Quiet on the Western Front – Edward Berger (Germany / United States)
- As Far as I Can Walk – Stefan Arsenijević (Serbia / Luxembourg / France / Bulgaria / Lithuania)
- The Beasts – Rodrigo Sorogoyen (Spain / France)
- Beautiful Beings – Guðmundur Arnar Guðmundsson (Iceland / Denmark / Sweden / Netherlands / Czech Republic)
- Belfast – Kenneth Branagh (United Kingdom / Ireland)
- Benediction – Terence Davies (United Kingdom)
- Boy from Heaven – Tarik Saleh (Sweden / France / Finland)
- Burning Days – Emin Alper (Turkey / France / Germany / Netherlands / Greece / Croatia)
- Close – Lukas Dhont (Belgium / France / Netherlands)
- Corsage – Marie Kreutzer (Austria / Luxembourg / Germany / France)
- The Eight Mountains – Felix van Groeningen & Charlotte Vandermeersch (Italy / Belgium /France)
- Eo – Jerzy Skolimowski (Poland / Italy)
- Girl Picture – Alli Haapasalo (Finland)
- Godland – Hlynur Pálmason (Denmark / Iceland / France / Sweden)
- The Hole – Michelangelo Frammartino (Italy / Germany / France)
- Holy Spider – Ali Abbasi (Denmark / Germany / Sweden / France)
- Maixabel – Iciar Bollain (Spain)
- Mediterranean Fever – Maha Haj (Germany / France / Cyprus / Palestine)
- More Than Ever – Emily Atef (France / Germany / Luxembourg / Norway)
- Nostalgia – Mario Martone (Italy / France)
- One Fine Morning – Mia Hansen-Løve (France / Germany)
- Pacifiction – Albert Serra (France / Spain / Germany / Portugal)
- Parallel Mothers – Pedro Almodóvar (Spain)
- The Quiet Girl – Colm Bairéad (Ireland)
- Rabiye Kurnaz vs. George W. Bush – Andreas Dresen (Germany / France)
- Reflection – Valentyn Vasyanovych (Ukraine)
- Saint Omer – Alice Diop (France)
- The Souvenir Part II – Joanna Hogg (UK)
- Tori and Lokita – Jean-Pierre & Luc Dardenne (Belgium / France)
- Triangle of Sadness – Ruben Östlund (Sweden / Germany / France / United Kingdom)
- Vera – Tizza Covi & Rainer Frimmel (Austria)
- Will-o'-the-Wisp – João Pedro Rodrigues (Portugal / France)
- Women Do Cry – Mina Mileva & Vesela Kazakova (Bulgaria / France)

=== Documentary ===
The selection of 13 documentary films was announced on 30 August 2022. Selection was determined by a committee consisting of Salma Abdallah (sales agent/Austria), Nenad Puhovski (festival director/Croatia), Katriel Schory (Academy Board – institutional/Israel) and Giedrė Žickytė (director/producer/Lithuania).

- Angels of Sinjar – Hanna Polak (Poland / Germany)
- The Balcony Movie – Paweł Łoziński (Poland)
- The Eclipse – Nataša Urban (Norway)
- Girl Gang – Susanne Regina Meures (Switzerland)
- A House Made of Splinters – Simon Lereng Wilmont (Denmark / Sweden / Finland / Ukraine)
- How to Save a Dead Friend – Marusya Syroechkovskaya (Sweden / Norway / France / Germany)
- Karaoke Paradise – Einari Paakkanen (Finland)
- The March on Rome – Mark Cousins (Italy)
- Mariupolis 2 – Mantas Kvedaravicius (Lithuania / France / Germany)
- Mr. Landsbergis – Sergei Loznitsa (Lithuania / Netherlands)
- Nelly & Nadine – Magnus Gertten (Sweden / Belgium / Norway)
- Republic of Silence – Diana El Jeiroudi (Germany / France / Syria / Qatar / Italy)
- A Thousand Fires – Saeed Taji Farouky (France / Switzerland / Netherlands / Palestine)
- Three Minutes – A Lengthening – Bianca Stigter (Netherlands / United Kingdom)

=== Short film ===
The European Short Film 2022 is presented in co-operation with the following European film festivals. At each of the festivals, a jury appointed by the festival chooses a single candidate.

- Affairs of the Art – Joanna Quinn (UK / Canada) – Valladolid International Film Festival
- Bachelorette Party – Lola Combourieu & Yann Berlier (France) – Sarajevo Film Festival
- The Bayview – Daniel Cook (UK) – Clermont-Ferrand International Short Film Festival
- Becoming Male in the Middle Ages – Pedro Neves Marques (Portugal) – International Film Festival Rotterdam
- Cherries – Vytautas Katkus (Lithuania) – Cannes Film Festival
- Dad's Sneakers – Olha Zhurba (Ukraine) – Kort Film Festival Leuven
- Dawn – Leonor Noivo (Portugal) – Hamburg Short Film Festival
- Granny's Sexual Life – Urška Djukić & Émilie Pigeard (Slovenia / France) – Uppsala Short Film Festival
- Handbook – Pavel Mozhar (Germany) – International Short Film Festival Nijmegen
- Ice Merchants – João Gonzalez (Portugal / France / UK) – Motovun Film Festival
- Le Saboteur – Anssi Kasitonni (Finland) – Tampere Film Festival
- Love, Dad – Diana Cam Van Nguyen (Czechia / Slovakia) – Kraków Film Festival
- Memoir of a Veering Storm – Sofia Georgovassili (Greece) – DokuFest
- Neighbour Abdi – Douwe Dijkstra (Netherlands) – Locarno Film Festival
- Nest – Hlynur Pálmason (Denmark / Iceland) – Odense Film Festival
- North Pole – Marija Apcevska (North Macedonia / Serbia) – International Festival of Documentary and Short Film of Bilbao
- On Solid Ground – Jela Hasler (Switzerland) – Internationale Kurzfilmtage Winterthur
- The Potemkinists – Radu Jude (Romania) – Curtas Vila do Conde – International Film Festival
- The Red Suitcase – Cyrus Neshvad (Luxembourg) – Tirana International Film Festival
- The Salamander Child – Théo Degen (Belgium) – Drama International Short Film Festival
- Sekundenarbeiten – Christiana Perschon (Austria) – International Short Film Festival Oberhausen
- Snow in September – Lkhagvadulam Purev-Ochir (France / Mongolia) – Venice International Film Festival
- The Sower of Stars – Lois Patiño (Spain) – Berlin International Film Festival
- Steakhouse – Špela Cadež (Slovenia / Germany / France) – International Short Film and Animation Festival PÖFF Shorts
- Techno, Mama – Saulius Baradinskas (Lithuania) – International Short Film Festival of Cyprus
- 38 – Joanna Rytel (Sweden) – Riga International Film Festival
- Urban Solutions – Arne Hector, Luciana Mazeto, Vinícius Lopes & Minze Tummescheit (Germany) – Encounters Film Festival
- When I Smile My Eyes Close – Daniel Bolda (Greece) – Cork International Film Festival
- Will My Parents Come to See Me – Mo Harawe (Austria / Germany / Somalia) – Vienna Short Film Festival

== Feature Film Awards ==
=== Best Film ===
English title	Director(s)	Producer(s)	Country	Language
Alcarràs	Carla Simón	María Zamora, Stefan Schmitz, Tono Folguera, Giovanni Pompili	Spain / Italy	Catalan, Spanish, English
Close	Lukas Dhont	Frans Van Gestel, Dirk Impens, Michiel Dhont, Michel Saint-Jean, Laurette Schillings, Jacques-Henri Bronckart	Belgium / France / Netherlands	Dutch, French, Flemish
Corsage	Marie Kreutzer	Alexander Glehr, Johanna Scherz, Jonas Dornbach, Janine Jackowski, Maren Ade, Jean-Christophe Reymand, Bernard Michaux	Austria / Luxembourg / Germany / France	German, French, English, Hungarian, Italian
Holy Spider	Ali Abbasi	Sol Bondy, Jacob Jarek	Denmark / Germany / Sweden / France	Persian
Triangle of Sadness	Ruben Östlund	Erik Hemmendorff, Philippe Bober	Sweden / Germany / France / United Kingdom	English

=== Best Director ===
Director(s)	English title
(Belgium) Lukas Dhont	Close
(Austria) Marie Kreutzer	Corsage
(Poland) Jerzy Skolimowski	Eo
(Denmark) / (Iran) Ali Abbasi	Holy Spider
(France) Alice Diop	Saint Omer
(Sweden) Ruben Östlund	Triangle of Sadness

=== Best Screenwriter ===
Screenwriter(s)	English title
(Spain) Arnau Vilaró (Spain) Carla Simón	Alcarràs
(United Kingdom) Kenneth Branagh	Belfast
(Belgium) Lukas Dhont (Belgium) Angelo Tijssens	Close
(Denmark) / (Iran) Ali Abbasi (Iran) Afshin Kamran Bahrami	Holy Spider
(Sweden) Ruben Östlund	Triangle of Sadness

=== Best Actor ===
Actor	English title	Role
(Republic of Ireland) Paul Mescal	Aftersun	Calum
(Belgium) Eden Dambrine	Close	Léo
(Denmark) / (United States) Elliott Crosset Hove	Godland	Lucas
(Italy) Pierfrancesco Favino	Nostalgia	Felice Lasco
(Croatia) / (Denmark) Zlatko Burić	Triangle of Sadness	Dimitry

=== Best Actress ===
Actor	English title	Role
(Luxembourg) Vicky Krieps	Corsage	Empress Elisabeth
(Iran) / (France) Zar Amir Ebrahimi	Holy Spider	Arezoo Rahimi
(France) Léa Seydoux	One Fine Morning	Sandra Kienzler
(Spain) Penélope Cruz	Parallel Mothers	Janis
(Germany) / (Turkey) Meltem Kaptan	Rabiye Kurnaz vs. George W. Bush	Rabiye Kurnaz

=== Excellence Awards ===
A special eight-members jury consisting of the following representatives of the different arts and crafts chose the winners based on the European Film Awards Feature Film Selection: Henrich Borarós (production designer, Czech Republic), Pascal Capitolin (sound designer, France), Jaime Cebrian (VFX supervisor, Spain), Charlotte Chang (make-up & hair artist, Germany), Christina Georgiou (composer, Cyprus), Magdalena Labuz (costume designer, Luxembourg), Sarah McTeigue (editor, Ireland/Italy), and Nathalie Pitters (cinematographer, UK).

European Cinematography	European Editing	European Production Design	European Costume Design
(Republic of Ireland) Kate McCullough for The Quiet Girl	(Turkey) Özcan Vardar & (Turkey) Eytan İpeker for Burning Days	(United Kingdom) Jim Clay for Belfast	(United Kingdom) Charlotte Walter for Belfast

European Make-Up & Hair	European Original Score	European Sound	European Visual Effects
(Germany) Heike Merker for All Quiet on the Western Front	(Poland) Paweł Mykietyn for Eo	(Italy) Simone Paolo Olivero, (Italy) Paolo Benvenuti, (Italy) Benni Atria, (Italy) Marco Saitta, (Germany) Ansgar Frerich & (Germany) Florian Holzner for The Hole	(Germany) Frank Petzold, (Germany) Viktor Müller & (Germany) Markus Frank for All Quiet on the Western Front

== Awards Not Based on Feature Film Selection ==
=== European Comedy ===
The award is presented to the director of a feature-length European comedy intended for theatrical release. Nominations were announced on 19 October 2022. Nominations were determined by a committee consisting of Graziella Bildesheim (Academy Board – institutional/Italy), Alby James (producer/UK), Denis Ivanov (producer/Ukraine), Roshi Behesht Nedjad (producer/Germany) and Mira Staleva (Academy Board – festival, distributor/Bulgaria).

English title	Director(s)	Country	Language
Cop Secret	Hannes Þór Halldórsson	(Iceland)	Icelandic, English, Mandarin, German
The Divide	Catherine Corsini	(France)	French
The Good Boss	Fernando León de Aranoa	(Spain)	Spanish

=== European Discovery – Prix FIPRESCI ===
In co-operation with FIPRESCI, the International Federation of Film Critics, the award is presented to a European director for their first full-length European feature film intended for theatrical release. Nominations were determined by a committee consisting of Kaleem Aftab (film writer, programmer and producer/UK), Janet Bariş (FIPRESCI – film critic/Turkey), Paola Casella (FIPRESCI – film critic/Italy), Virginie Devesa (Academy Board – sales agent/France), Marion Döring (institutional/Germany), Frédéric Ponsard (FIPRESCI – film critic/France), Alik Shpilyuk (FIPRESCI – film critic/Ukraine), Britt Sørensen (FIPRESCI – film critic/Norway) and Joanna Szymańska (Academy Board – producer/Poland).

Director(s)	English title
(France) Emmanuelle Nicot	Love According to Dalva
(Slovakia) Peter Kerekes	107 Mothers
(Poland) Aleksandra Terpińska	Other People
(Ukraine) Dmytro Sukholytkyy-Sobchuk	Pamfir
(Italy) Laura Samani	Small Body
(Austria) / (Iraq) Kurdwin Ayub	Sonne

=== European Documentary ===
The award is presented to the European director(s) of a European documentary intended for theatrical release.

English title	Director(s)	Country	Language
The Balcony Movie	Paweł Łoziński	Poland	Polish
Girl Gang	Susanne Regina Meures	Switzerland	German
A House Made of Splinters	Simon Lereng Wilmont	Denmark / Sweden / Finland / Ukraine	Russian, Ukrainian
The March on Rome	Mark Cousins	Italy	English, Italian
Mariupolis 2	Mantas Kvedaravičius	Lithuania / France / Germany	Ukrainian, Russian

=== European Animated Feature Film ===
In co-operation with CARTOON, the European Association of Animation Film, the award is presented to the European director(s) of a European animated feature film intended for theatrical release. Nominations were announced on 19 October 2022. Nominations were determined by a committee consisting of Antonio Saura (Academy Board – sales agent/Spain), Jonas Poher Rasmussen (director/Denmark) and Denisa Grimmová (CARTOON – director/Czech Republic).

English title	Director(s)	Country	Language
Little Nicholas: Happy As Can Be	Amandine Fredon & Benjamin Massoubre	France / Luxembourg	French
My Love Affair with Marriage	Signe Baumane	Latvia / United States / Luxembourg	English
My Neighbors' Neighbors	Anne-Laure Daffis & Léo Marchand	France	French
No Dogs or Italians Allowed	Alain Ughetto	France / Italy / Belgium / Switzerland / Portugal	French, Italian, German
Oink	Mascha Halberstad	Netherlands / Belgium	Dutch

=== European Short Film ===
The award is presented to the European director(s) of a European short film. The award is presented in cooperation with various European festivals (see Short Film selection above), all of which select a single candidate and later nominate 5 films. The nominees were announced on 19 October 2022.

English title	Director(s)	Country	Language
Granny's Sexual Life	Urška Djukič & Émilie Pigeard	Slovenia / France	Slovenian
Ice Merchants	João Gonzalez	Portugal / France / UK	no dialogues
Love, Dad	Diana Cam Van Nguyen	Czechia / Slovakia	Czech
Techno, Mama	Saulius Baradinskas	Lithuania	Lithuanian
Will My Parents Come to See Me	Mo Harawe	Austria / Germany / Somalia	Somali

== Honorary Awards ==
EFA Lifetime Achievement Award	European Achievement in World Cinema	European Innovative Storytelling	Eurimages Co-Production Award	European Sustainability Award – Prix Film4Climate
(Germany) Margarethe von Trotta	(Palestine) Elia Suleiman	(Italy) Marco Bellocchio for Exterior Night	(Ukraine) Ukrainian producers	(European Union) European Green Deal

== Special awards ==
=== Lux European Audience Film Award 2023 ===
The award is directed to recognize films which help to raise awareness of socio-political issues in Europe. Close, directed by Lukas Dhont, was awarded the prize in a ceremony in the European Parliament's Hemicycle in Brussels on 27 June 2023.

English title	Director(s)	Country
Close	Lukas Dhont	(Belgium) / (France) / (Netherlands)
Alcarràs	Carla Simón	(Spain) / (Italy)
Burning Days	Emin Alper	(Turkey) / (France) / (Germany) / (Netherlands) / (Greece) / (Croatia)
Triangle of Sadness	Ruben Östlund	(Sweden) / (Germany) / (France) / (United Kingdom)
Will-o'-the-Wisp	João Pedro Rodrigues	(Portugal) / (France)

=== EFA Young Audience Award (YAA) ===
The award is presented to the director of a European film that addresses an audience between 12 and 14 years of age. The winner was announced during the online award ceremony on Sunday, 13 November 2022, in Erfurt (Germany), hosted by youth council members Maria from Portugal and Emmerson from the UK.

English title	Director(s)	Country	Language
Animal	Cyril Dion	France	English, French
Comedy Queen	Sanna Lenken	Sweden	Swedish
Dreams Are Like Wild Tigers	Lars Montag	Germany	German

=== European University Film Award (EUFA) ===
Presented in co-operation with Filmfest Hamburg, the award actively involves university students, spreads the “European idea” and transports the spirit of European cinema to an audience group of 20-29-year-olds. It also supports film dissemination, film education and the culture of debating. Based on the Feature Film Selection 2022 and the Documentary Selection 2022 Filmfest Hamburg and EFA nominate five films. They are later viewed in non-commercial closed jury sessions and discussed at the participating universities. The students at each institution select their favourite film. The nominations were announced on 7 October 2022. The winner was announced on 9 December 2022.

English title	Director(s)	Country	Language
Eo	Jerzy Skolimowski	Poland / Italy	Polish, Italian, English, French
Alcarràs	Carla Simón	Spain / Italy	Catalan, Spanish, English
Close	Lukas Dhont	Belgium / France / Netherlands	Dutch, French, Flemish
The Eclipse	Nataša Urban	Norway	Serbian, Romanian
Triangle of Sadness	Ruben Östlund	Sweden / Germany / France / United Kingdom	English
