= Czech Film Critics' Award for Best Film =

Award given by Czech Film Critics for best Czech motion picture

- Country: Czech Republic
- First award: 2010
- Currently held by: Broken Voices
- Website: filmovakritika.cz

Czech Film Critics' Award for Best Film is one of the awards given to the best Czech motion picture.

== Winners ==
Year	English Name	Original Name	Director
2010	Walking Too Fast	Pouta	Radim Špaček
2011	Long Live the Family!	Rodina je základ státu	Robert Sedláček
2012	In the Shadow	Ve stínu	David Ondříček
2013	Burning Bush	Hořící keř	Agnieszka Holland
2014	The Way Out	Cesta ven	Petr Václav
2015	Lost in Munich	Ztraceni v Mnichově	Petr Zelenka
2016	Family Film	Rodinný film	Olmo Omerzu
2017	Filthy	Špína	Tereza Nvotová
2018	Jan Palach	Jan Palach	Robert Sedláček
2019	Old-Timers	Staříci	Martin Dušek, Ondřej Provazník
2020	Shadow Country	Krajina ve stínu	Bohdan Sláma
2021	Occupation	Okupace	Michal Nohejl
2022	Arved	Arvéd	Vojtěch Mašek
2023	She Came at Night	Přišla v noci	Jan Vejnar, Tomáš Pavlíček
2024	Girl America	Amerikánka	Viktor Tauš
2025	Broken Voices	Sbormistr	Ondřej Provazník
