= Špunti na cestě =

- Genre: Comedy
- Directed by: Jiří Chlumský
- Starring: Jiří Langmajer; Tatiana Dyková; David Novotný; Anna Polívková; Pavel Liška
- Country of origin: Czech Republic
- Original language: Czech
- No. of seasons: 1
- No. of episodes: 13

Production
- Cinematography: Lukáš Hyksa
- Running time: 49-55 minutes

Original release
- Network: ČT1
- Release: January 7 – April 1, 2022

Špunti na cestě is a 2022 Czech comedy and family series. The series was directed by Jiří Chlumský while script was written by Marcel Bystroň and Petr Hudský. The series is a sequel of a film River Rascals, which was seen in cinemas by almost half a million viewers. Jiří Langmajer, Pavel Liška, Tatiana Dyková, Anna Polívková or Jana Kvantiková reprised their roles from the film, Miroslav Donutil, Pavla Gajdošíková, or David Novotný appeared in the series.

The thirteen-part series premiered on 7 January 2022 on ČT1.

== Plot ==
The series tells the story of the Veselý family, who go on vacation. However, instead of the originally planned trip to the sea, they find themselves in a modified residential bus. During the holidays, they experience many moments together that gradually bring the disparate family together.

== Cast ==
- David Novotný as David Veselý
- Anna Polívková as Alice Veselá
- Jiří Langmajer as JUDr. Igor Veselý
- Tatiana Dyková as Nela Veselá
- Pavel Liška as Ondra Veselý
- Miroslav Donutil as strýc Karel Veselý
- Arnošt Goldflam as Arnošt Veselý
- Dana Syslová as Eliška Veselá
- Filip Antonio as Kuba Veselý
- Viktor Antonio as Mates Veselý
- Antonín Holoubek as Vojta Veselý
- Veronika Divišová as Bára Veselá
- Ella Dvořáková as Klára Veselá
- Jolana Jirotková as Kačenka Veselá
- Pavla Gajdošíková as Jitka Kozová
- Jana Kvantiková as Zlatica Krčáková

== Episodes ==
| No. | Title | Directed by | Original release date | Czech viewers (millions) |
|---|---|---|---|---|
| 1 | "Poslední prázdniny" | Jiří Chlumský | January 7, 2022 | 1.698 |
| 2 | "Smlouva" | Jiří Chlumský | January 14, 2022 | 1,563 |
| 3 | "Velký vůz" | Jiří Chlumský | January 21, 2022 | 1.409 |
| 4 | "Krab" | Jiří Chlumský | January 28, 2022 | 1.481 |
| 5 | "Partyzán" | Jiří Chlumský | February 4, 2022 | 1.418 |
| 6 | "Vesna" | Jiří Chlumský | February 11, 2022 | 1.181 |
| 7 | "Guru" | Jiří Chlumský | February 18, 2022 | 1.248 |
| 8 | "Únos" | Jiří Chlumský | February 25, 2022 | 1.291 |
| 9 | "Koza" | Jiří Chlumský | March 4, 2022 | 1.197 |
| 10 | "Sabotér" | Jiří Chlumský | March 11, 2022 | 1.077 |
| 11 | "Doba kamenná" | Jiří Chlumský | March 18, 2022 | 1.082 |
| 12 | "Host do domu" | Jiří Chlumský | March 25, 2022 | 1.094 |
| 13 | "Karel Veselý" | Jiří Chlumský | April 1, 2022 | 1.184 |
