= Duch =

Duch may refer to:

- Bolesław Bronisław Duch (1885–1980), Polish general
- Jaume Duch (born 1962), Spanish politician
- Rhys Duch (born 1986), Canadian lacrosse player
- Duch (TV series), a 2022 Czech television series
- Kang Kek Iew alias Comrade Duch (1942–2020), Cambodian convicted war criminal
- Jordi Salvador, full name Jordi Salvador i Duch (born 1964), Spanish politician and trade unionist
- Duch., the standard author abbreviation used to indicate Pierre Étienne Simon Duchartre as the author when citing a botanical name

== See also ==
- David Duchovny
