= Czech Lion Award for Best Actress in Leading Role =

Film award category

- Country: Czech Republic
- First award: 1993
- Currently held by: Kateřina Falbrová
- Website: https://www.filmovaakademie.cz

Czech Lion Award for Best Actress in Leading Role is an annual award given to the best female actor in a leading role of a Czech film.

== Winners ==
Year	Actor	Film title (English)	Film title (Original)
1993	Jiřina Bohdalová	The Immortal Woman	Nesmrtelná teta
1994	Ivana Chýlková	Thanks for Every New Morning	Díky za každé nové ráno
1995	Jiřina Bohdalová	Fany	Fany
1996	Libuše Šafránková	Kolya	Kolja
1997	Lenka Vlasáková	Lea	Lea
1998	Iva Janžurová	In the Rye	Co chytneš v žitě
1999	Tereza Brodská	Double Role	Dvojrole
2000	Anna Šišková	Divided We Fall	Musíme si pomáhat
2001	Stella Zázvorková	Autumn Spring	Babí léto
2002	Iva Janžurová	Some Secrets	Výlet
2003	Anna Geislerová	Želary	Želary
2004	Emília Vášáryová	Up and Down	Horem pádem
2005	Tatiana Vilhelmová	Something Like Happiness	Štěstí
2006	Anna Geislerová	Beauty in Trouble	Kráska v nesnázích
2007	Marion Cotillard	La Vie en rose	Edith Piaf
2008	Zuzana Bydžovská	The Country Teacher	Venkovský učitel
2009	Jana Plodková	Protector	Protektor
2010	Zuzana Bydžovská	Mamas & Papas	Mamas & Papas
2011	Anna Geislerová	Innocence	Nevinnost
2012	Gabriela Míčová	Garbage, the City and Death	Odpad město smrt
2013	Petra Špalková	Like Never Before	Jako nikdy
2014	Klaudia Dudová	Way Out	Cesta ven
2015	Alena Mihulová	Home Care	Domácí péče
2016	Michalina Olszańska	I, Olga Hepnarová	Já, Olga Hepnarová
2017	Zuzana Kronerová	Ice Mother	Bába z ledu
2018	Jenovéfa Boková	Moments	Chvilky
2019	Tereza Ramba	Owners	Vlastníci
2020	Magdaléna Borová	Shadow Country	Krajina ve stínu
2021	Pavla Gajdošíková	Mistakes	Chyby
2022	Klára Melíšková	Suspicion	Podezření
2023	Simona Peková	She Came at Night	Přišla v noci
2024	Pavla Beretová	Year of the Widow	Rok vdovy
2025	Kateřina Falbrová	Broken Voices	Sbormistr
