= Anna Polívková =

Czech actress

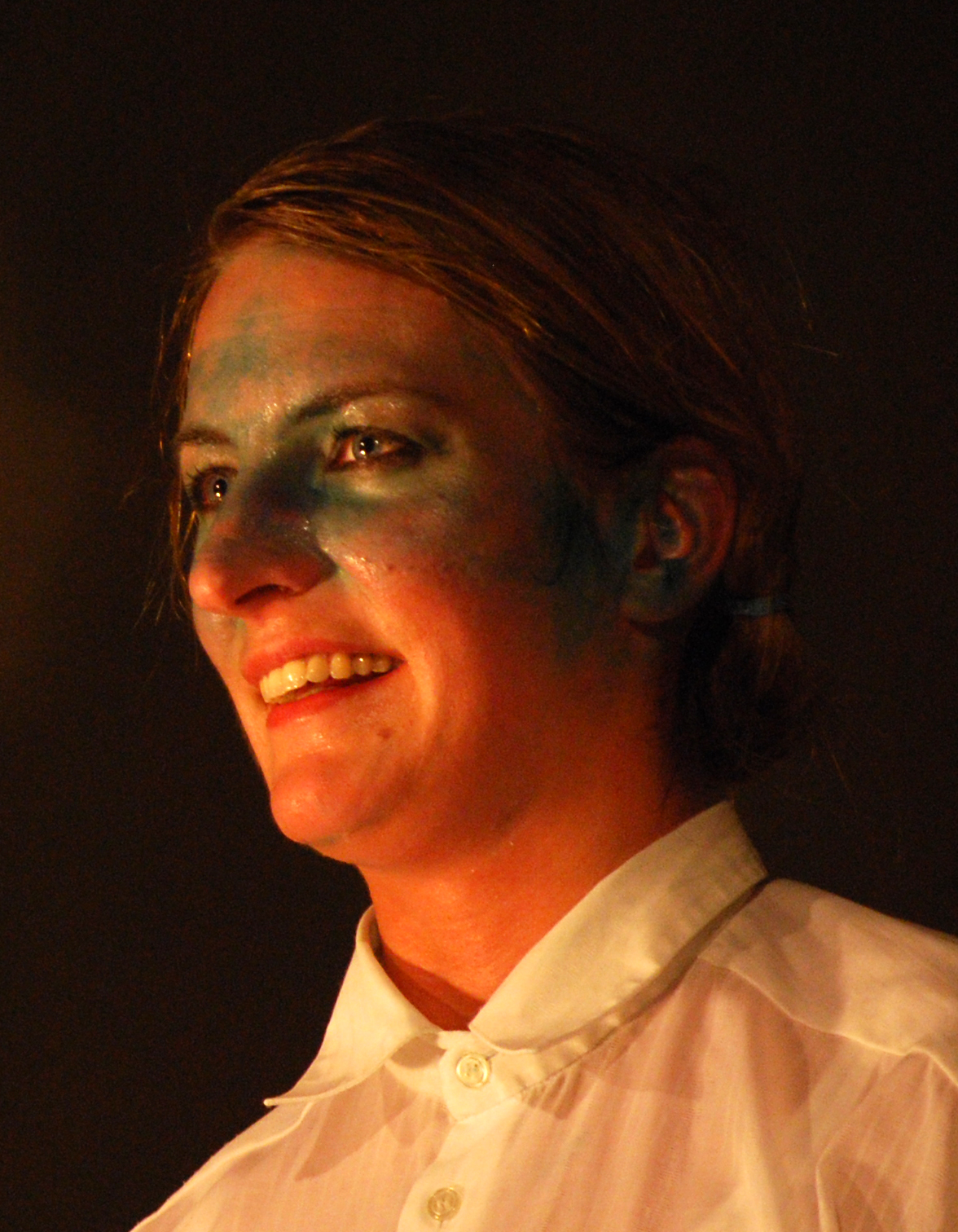
- Anna Polívková
- Born: 24 March 1979 (age 46); Prague, Czechoslovakia
- Occupation: Actress
- Years active: 1999–present
- Relatives: Bolek Polívka (father); Barbora Kodetová (cousin)

Anna Polívková (born 24 March 1979 in Prague) is a Czech actress.

In December 2013 Polívková won the sixth season of StarDance with her professional partner Michal Kurtiš.

== Selected filmography ==
=== Films ===
- Dvě nevěsty a jedna svatba (2018)
- Po čem muži touží (2018)
- Pohádky pro Emu (2016)
- Účastníci zájezdu (2006)
- The Idiot Returns (1999)

=== TV series ===
- Špunti na cestě (2022)
- Živě z mechu (2016)
- Až po uši (2014)
- Ordinace v růžové zahradě (2005)
