= Even Mice Belong in Heaven =

- Czech theatrical release poster
- Directed by: Jan Bubeníček; Denisa Grimmová
- Based on: Mice Go to Heaven by Iva Procházková
- Produced by: Alexandre Charlet; Jonathan Hazan; Tomas Janisek; Marek Jenicek; Vladimír Lhoták; Piotr Szczepanowicz; Grzegorz Waclawek; André Logie; Gaëtan David; Petr Tichý
- Starring: Pavlína Balner; Matouš Ruml
- Cinematography: Radek Loukota
- Music by: Krzysztof A. Janczak
- Production companies: Fresh Films; Les Films du Cygne; Animoon; CinemArt SK; Canal+ Polska; Barrandov Studio; EC1 Lódz - Miasto Kultury; Panache Productions; Haus Boot
- Distributed by: CinemArt (Czech Republic & Slovakia); Gebeka Films (France); Association New Horizons (Poland)
- Release dates: 14 June 2021 (Annecy); 7 October 2021 (Czech Republic); 27 October 2021 (France); 13 January 2022 (Slovakia); 29 April 2022 (Poland)
- Running time: 88 minutes
- Countries: Czech Republic; France; Poland; Slovakia
- Languages: Czech; English; French
- Budget: 92 million CZK
- Box office: 18,013,522 CZK

Even Mice Belong in Heaven (Czech: Myši patří do nebe) is a 2021 co-production animated film directed by Jan Bubeníček and Denisa Grimmová based on the book Mice Go to Heaven by Iva Procházková.

== Accolades ==
It received two Czech Lion Awards - one for Best Animated Film and the second for Best Music. It also won the Czech Film Critics' Award for Best Audiovisual Creation. The film was presented at Shanghai International Film Festival where it received award for the Best Animated Film. It is the most expensive Czech animated film.

== Plot ==
After a fatal accident, the cheeky mouse Whizzy and the stuttering fox Whitebelly meet again in animal heaven. Once there, Whizzy and Whitebelly find swings, carousels and many other attractions.

== Voice cast ==
Character	Original Actor	Dub Actor
Whizzy	Pavlína Balner	Simona Berman
Whitebelly	Matouš Ruml	Graham Halstead
Muzzle	Martin Stránský	Major Attaway
Frog	Barbora Hrzánová	Erica Schroeder
Cat	Martha Issová	Emily Cramer
Crab	Martin Dejdar	Billy Bob Thompson
Snake	Ondřej Brousek	Billy Bob Thompson
Moley	Lukáš Pavlásek	Marc Thompson
Crocodile	Jiří Klem	Marc Thompson
Hippo	¿?	Marc Thompson
Pig	¿?	Marc Thompson
Raccoon	Jiří Lábus	Graham Halstead
Parrot	Matěj Ruppert	Wayne Grayson
Raven	Matěj Ruppert	Wayne Grayson
Chameleon	Jan Bubeníček	Wayne Grayson
Peacock	Miroslav Donutil	Tom Wayland
Sheep	¿?	Tom Wayland
Badger	Jiří Schwarz	Tom Wayland
June Bug Captain	David Novotný	Tom Wayland
Crayfish	Miroslav Etzler	Tyler Bunch
Owl	Miroslav Donutil	Tyler Bunch
Goat	Ludmila Molínová	Mary O'Brady
Whale	¿?	Elinor Vanderburg
Mama Mouse	¿?	Simona Berman
Papa Mouse	Ondřej Vetchý	Ryan Andes

=== Additional Voices ===
- Tyler Bunch
- Paul Castro Jr.
- Emily Cramer
- Wayne Grayson
- Eddy Lee
- Mike Pollock - June Bugs
- Erica Schroeder
- Courtney Shaw
- Billy Bob Thompson - June Bugs
- Marc Thompson
- Tom Wayland

== Production ==
The film is based on the children's book Mice Go to Heaven by Iva Procházková with illustrations by Marine Ludin. In the book, a little mouse called Whizzy flees from the hungry fox Whitebelly, misses a root, stumbles and falls off a high rock.

Born in Paris, Ludin studied at the Ecole Nationale Supérieure d'Art in Nancy and illustration at the University of Applied Sciences in Hamburg with Rüdiger Stoye, graduating as a qualified designer in 2005. Since then, Ludin has worked as a freelance illustrator for German and French publishers. The Czech Procházková lived with her family in Germany for ten years. before returning to Prague. Her children's and youth books have been nominated for the Hans Christian Andersen Medal and the Catholic Children's and Youth Book Prize and have been awarded the Friedrich Gerstäcker Prize, the Evangelical Book Prize and the German Youth Literature Prize. Ivan Pokorný had already filmed Procházková's youth novel Orange Days, which is set in the Lusatian mountains.

Even Mice Belong in Heaven was adapted for film by director and screenwriter Alice Nellis, who has won several Český lev awards, and Richard Malatinský, who previously worked mainly on television. Directed by Jan Bubeníček and Denisa Grimmová. For Grimmová it is her first full-length film. Bubeníček previously directed the feature film Smrtelné historky.

Myši patří do nebe, the original title of the film, was made in the Barrandov Studios in Prague. In addition to stop motion, CGI was also used. Animators include Frantisek Vasa, Piotr Ficner, Vojtech Kiss, Michal Kubíček, Katarzyna Okoniewska, Viliam Vala and Matous Valchar. The production design was created by director Denisa Grimmová and Jan Kurka. Radek Loukota acted as cameraman.

== Release ==
The film premiered in June at the Annecy Festival d'Animation. Performances at the Karlovy Vary Film Festival and the Edinburgh International Film Festival followed in August 2021. In October 2021, it was shown at the Hamburg Film Festival and the Festival International du Film Francophone de Namur. The film was first released in the United Kingdom on 1 October 2021. It was then released in Czech cinemas on 7 October 2021, and in French cinemas on 27 October. The film was released in Slovakia on 13 January 2022. It will be screened at the Leeds Film Festival in April 2022. The theatrical release in Poland took place on 29 April 2022. It was screened at the Revolution Perth International Film Festival in July 2022.

== Soundtrack ==
The film music was composed by Krzysztof A. Janczak. In October 2021, MovieScore Media released the soundtrack album with a total of 35 tracks as a download.
