= Po čem muži touží =

2018 Czech comedy film

- Directed by: Rudolf Havlík
- Starring: Tatiana Pauhofová, Jiří Langmajer, Anna Polívková
- Release date: 2 September 2018
- Running time: 95 minutes
- Country: Czech Republic
- Language: Czech
- Box office: 73,375,512 CZK

Po čem muži touží (translated as What Men Want) is a 2018 Czech comedy film directed by Rudolf Havlík.

== Plot ==
The movie tells the story of a charismatic and self-confident man, Karel Král. At first sight a successful man, a bit chauvinist maybe, but still very popular with women, though in fact struggling in his personal life. He argues with his former wife over his 17-year-old daughter, who hates him because of the way he leads his life.

And one day, the consequences of his behaviour finally take effect. He loses his job because of several mistakes and a consequent decline in the number of the sold magazines, he gets into a fight with his former wife and daughter again, a woman crashes his car and for his position of editor-in-chief is hired young and beautiful Leona. Karel and his best friend Čestmír decide to solve it in a typical way - they get drunk and during the wild night, he expresses a wish to become a woman and in the morning, he wakes up in the body of a woman

== Soundtrack ==
The film also features The Silver Spoons first official single "He´s Got My Money Now" which after being released instantly became a radio sensation in the Czech Republic and enabled them to win Best New Artist of the year at the IREPORT Music Awards.

== Cast ==
- Tatiana Pauhofová as Leona
- Jiří Langmajer as Karel
- Anna Polívková as Karla
- Matěj Hádek as Čestmír
- Sara Sandeva as Julie
