= Dušan Kaprálik =

Slovak actor (1948–2023)

- Born: 21 February 1948; Martin, Czechoslovakia
- Died: 8 August 2023 (aged 75); Bratislava, Slovakia
- Education: Academy of Performing Arts in Bratislava
- Years active: 1971–2021
- Children: 4

Dušan Kaprálik (21 February 1948 – 8 August 2023) was a Slovak actor.

Dušan Kaprálik was born on in Martin 21 February 1948. In his youth, he was interested in mathematics and physics, but eventually decided to pursue an acting career. He studied at the Academy of Performing Arts in Bratislava.

Following his graduation, he acted at regional theatres in Trnava, Nitra and his hometown of Martin. In 1973 he joined the New Scene theatre in Bratislava, where he remained until his retirement for health reasons in 2021. He taught acting at the Bratislava Conservatory.

In addition to stage acting, he acted in several movies, including The Teacher (2016) and Old-Timers (2019).

== Personal life and death ==
Kaprálik was married to Helena Romančíková, the daughter of the actor Elo Romančík. They had two children together. She died at the age of 33 following a sudden illness. Kaprálik later married Silvia Kapráliková, a fencer, with whom he had additional two children.

Dušan Kaprálik died on 8 August 2023, at the age of 75 at a retirement home in the Dúbravka borough of Bratislava.
