= Bird Atlas =

- Directed by: Olmo Omerzu
- Produced by: Jiří Konečný
- Starring: Miroslav Donutil
- Cinematography: Lukáš Milota
- Edited by: Jana Vlčková
- Music by: Monika Omerzu Midriaková
- Distributed by: CinemArt
- Release date: 2 September 2021; (Czech Republic)
- Running time: 92 minutes
- Countries: Czech Republic; Slovakia; Slovenia
- Language: Czech
- Budget: 1.7 Million EUR
- Box office: 288,081 CZK

Bird Atlas (Czech: Atlas ptáků) is a 2021 coproduction drama film directed by Olmo Omerzu. It was included in the main competition for Karlovy Vary International Film Festival in August 2021.

== Cast ==
- Miroslav Donutil as Ivo
- Alena Mihulová as Marie
- Martin Pechlát as Martin
- Eliška Křenková as Nina
- Vojtěch Kotek as David
- Pavla Beretová as Eva
- Martin Havelka
- Jan Vondráček
- Philipp Schenker
- David Bowles
