= Slávek Horák =

Czech director, actor, and screenwriter

- Born: 12 January 1975 (age 50); Zlín, Czech Republic
- Occupation(s): Film director, screenwriter

Slávek Horák (born 12 January 1975 in Zlín) is a Czech film director, screenwriter and actor. He is a graduate of Zlin Film School and also studied directing at the Film and TV School of the Academy of Performing Arts in Prague (FAMU). His rapid career growth as a director of various international commercial campaigns prevented him from finishing his FAMU studies, but also earned him several awards at International Advertising festivals. He shot two short films for international project Straight8 that were selected in top six and shown at the Cannes Film Festival. He also worked as an assistant director with Jan Sverak on his Academy Award winning film Kolja (1996). In 2012 he started his own production company TVORBA films. Home Care is his feature debut. The film was selected as the Czech entry for the Best Foreign Language Film at the 88th Academy Awards.

== Selected filmography ==
- Two Little Wings (2004 – short)
- Deja Vu (2005 – short)
- Home Care (2015)
- Havel (2020)
