= Marta Dancingerová =

Czech actress

- Born: 26 September 1991 (age 34); Znojmo, Czechoslovakia
- Citizenship: Czech Republic
- Occupation: Actress
- Children: 1

Marta Dancingerová (born 26 September 1991) is a Czech actress and writer.

== Life and career ==
Dancingerová was born in Znojmo and spent her childhood in Moravský Krumlov. After graduating from the Brno Conservatory, she started studying at the Theatre Faculty of the Academy of Performing Arts in Prague in 2011. She studied drama acting there, and her classmates included Miroslava Pleštilová, Michal Pavlata, and Milan Schejbal. During her studies, she was a guest at the J. K. Tyl Theatre and the Mladá Boleslav Municipal Theatre. In the summer of 2016, she played the main role in the TV fairy tale Slíbená princezna.

Between 2016 and 2019, Dancingerová performed at the Švanda Theatre in Smíchov, and since 2020 she has been working as a permanent guest at the theatre. Dancingerová portrayed Erika Šafářová, an ambulance driver who suffers from postpartum depression, in the medical drama soap opera Ordinace v růžové zahradě 2. In 2021, she portrayed Tereza in the comedy-drama series Kukačky, about parents whose child was switched during childbirth. The following year, in 2022, she portrayed police investigator Radka Vrbová in the detective series Duch.

== Other work ==
In 2021, Dancingerová published her first book entitled Nesmělí. In 2022, she published a children's book entitled Nikolas a tajemství Snozemě. In 2024, Dancingerová published a book entitled Maluj můru nohama vzhůru.

== Personal life ==
Dancingerová has a son Antonín with actor Marek Pospíchal. In 2025, they split.

== Filmography ==
=== Film ===
Year	Title	Role	Notes
2011	Westernstory		
2012	Martin a Venuše		
2014	Krásná neznámá	beauty	student film
2014	Limbo	Tereza	student film
2021	Mistakes	Jarka	

=== Television ===
Year	Title	Role	Notes
2014	Až po uši		
2014	Nevinné lži	assistant	Episode: "Zrádce"
2015	Crossing Lines	Margita Baniková	Episode: "Dragon"
2016	Slíbená princezna	Čirá Radost	TV film
2018	Specialisté	Táňa Šubrtová	Episode: "Na vlastní pěst"
2019	Princip slasti	Jana	
2019–present	Ordinace v růžové zahradě 2	Erika Šafářová	
2020	Terapie sdílením	bride	internet series, Episode: "Rozlučka"
2020	Velmi křehké větve	Yvonina kamarádka	internet series
2021	Kukačky	Tereza Kadlecová	main role
2022	Duch	Radka Vrbová	main role
2022	Specialisté	Martina Svátková	Episode: "Fake news"
2022	Iveta	Věra	miniseries
2023	Obchodní dům		
2023	Kukačky	Tereza Kadlecová	main role
2023	Zlatá labuť	Barbora Veselá	main role
