= Love, Dad =

2021 film by Diana Cam Van Nguyen

- Czech: Milý tati
- Directed by: Diana Cam Van Nguyen
- Written by: Lukas Janicik; Diana Cam Van Nguyen
- Produced by: Karolina Davidova
- Cinematography: Krystof Melka; Matej Pino
- Edited by: Lukas Janicik
- Music by: Viera Marinová
- Animation by: Vojtech Domlátil; Barbora Halírová; David Stumpf; Diana Cam Van Nguyen
- Production companies: 13ka FAMU; Nutprodukcia
- Release date: 6 August 2021 (Locarno)
- Running time: 12 minutes
- Countries: Czech Republic; Slovakia
- Language: Czech

Love, Dad (Czech: Milý tati) is a Czech/Slovak animated short documentary film, directed by Diana Cam Van Nguyen and released in 2021. The film centres on her relationship with her father, which was loving in her childhood but became strained and distant as she grew into adulthood.

The film premiered on 6 August 2021 at the 74th Locarno Film Festival.

== Awards ==
Award	Date of ceremony	Category	Recipient(s)	Result	Ref(s)
Toronto International Film Festival	2021	Share Her Journey	Diana Cam Van Nguyen	Honored	
Festival du nouveau cinéma	2021	New Alchemists, Animated Short Film	Diana Cam Van Nguyen	Won	
AFI Fest	2021	Grand Jury Prize, Animation	Diana Cam Van Nguyen	Won	
Tallinn Black Nights Film Festival	2021	Best Student Short Animation	Diana Cam Van Nguyen	Won	
Clermont-Ferrand International Short Film Festival	2022	Festivals Connexion Award	Diana Cam Van Nguyen	Won	
Czech Lion Awards	2021	Best Short Film	Diana Cam Van Nguyen	Won	
Czech Lion Awards	2021	Best Student Film	Diana Cam Van Nguyen	Won	
Seattle International Film Festival	2022	Grand Jury Prize for Best Animated Short	Diana Cam Van Nguyen	Won	
Kraków Film Festival	2022	Silver Dragon, Best Animated Film	Diana Cam Van Nguyen	Won	
Kraków Film Festival	2022	Jury Award for Best European Film	Diana Cam Van Nguyen	Won	
Kraków Film Festival	2022	FICC Don Quixote Award	Diana Cam Van Nguyen	Honored	
Palm Springs International Festival of Short Films	2022	Best Student Documentary Short	Diana Cam Van Nguyen	Won	
Nashville Film Festival	2022	Best Documentary Short	Diana Cam Van Nguyen	Won	
Kyiv International Film Festival "Molodist"	2022	International Competition, Student Films	Diana Cam Van Nguyen	Won	
European Film Awards	2022	Best Short Film	Diana Cam Van Nguyen	Nominated	
Annie Awards	2023	Best Animated Short Subject	Diana Cam Van Nguyen	Nominated	
