= Ladislav Mrkvička =

Czech actor (1939–2020)

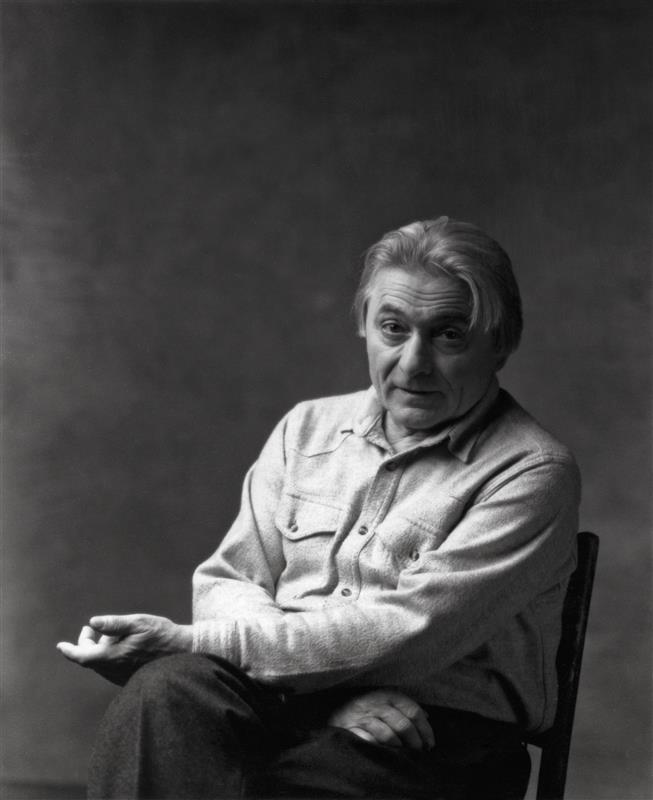
- Born: 2 February 1939; Prague, Czechoslovakia
- Died: 27 December 2020 (aged 81); Prague, Czech Republic
- Occupation: Actor
- Years active: 1959–2019

Ladislav Mrkvička (2 February 1939 in Prague – 27 December 2020) was a Czech actor.

He starred in the film Atentát and in the television series Thirty Cases of Major Zeman, both under director Jiří Sequens. For his performance in the film Old-Timers, he received the Czech Lion 2019 for Best Supporting Actor.

In 1962, he graduated from the Theatre Faculty of the Academy of Performing Arts in Prague. From 1991, he was a member of the National Theatre in Prague. In 2019, he received the Thalia Award for Lifetime Achievement.

Mrkvička died from COVID-19 in 2020.
