= Nightsiren =

- Directed by: Tereza Nvotová
- Written by: Barbora Namerova; Tereza Nvotová
- Produced by: Miloš Lochman
- Starring: Natalia Germani; Eva Mores; Marek Geišberg; Jana Oľhová; Iva Bittová; Juliána Oľhová
- Music by: Pjoni; Rob
- Production company: moloko film
- Release date: 29 October 2022
- Running time: 106 minutes
- Countries: Czechia; Slovakia
- Language: Slovak

Nightsiren (Slovak: Svetlonoc, Czech: Světlonoc) is a 2022 Slovak-Czech feminist psychological horror drama by director Tereza Nvotová. The film premiered at the Locarno Film Festival, where it won the Golden Leopard – Filmmakers of the Present award.

== Plot ==
While running away from her abusive mother, a girl named Šarlota accidentally pushes her sister Tamara off a cliff. Years later, Šarlota, now a young adult, returns to the village, summoned by a letter from the mayor, requesting her to claim her mother's inheritance. Because she ran away as a child and was never found, she is met with distrust and superstition: She and Tamara had been claimed to have been taken by an accused witch, Otyla, a neighbour of their childhood home.

Told that the mayor is away through the Easter holidays, Šarlota settles into Otyla's abandoned home, her own childhood home long since burned down, and befriends local Mira. As part of a tradition, locals eventually throw a fighting Mira into a lake and attempt the same with a screaming Šarlota, who kicks an onlooking child and is not believed when she asserts that it was an accident.

Helena, a gender non-conforming local who is in love with Mira, mentions that Otyla was taking care of a "wild child". The child was taken away because it was mute and bit people. Šarlota believes that child might have been Tamara.

Šarlota confides in Mira that she had a miscarriage, and feels guilty about it, as she does not want any children and feels that that lack of love must have caused the fetus's death. Šarlota's boyfriend left her afterwards. Helena's father Tomáš later attempts to rape Mira, who manages to fight him off and runs into the woods. Tomáš then has sex with his devout wife Anna, who prevents him from pulling out while climaxing.

Tomáš eventually threatens his two young sons, Helena's brothers, with violence, and they run off. At a midsummar celebration, people sing, consume drinks prepared by Mira with her own herb mixture and start dancing. While dancing, a local gropes Šarlota, who pushes him off. He falls to the ground, and the bystanding locals get angry, victim-shaming her for dancing "like a whore". Frustrated, Šarlota walks off with shepherd Rado.

In the nearby woods, Šarlota experiences a drug trip, presumably caused by Mira's herbs, and witnesses witch-like people perform dances and orgies. Eventually she has sex with Rado. Helena runs into a dancing coven of young naked women and is kissed by Mira, but runs away when the women's youthful facade falls away, revealing the coven to be all older women. Helena flees through the woods and falls over the same cliff that Tamara had as a child.

The next day, Helena's brothers have gone missing and search parties are sent out. Šarlota realizes that Mira is Tamara, and they reconcile. Their mother hung herself before Mira returned home, having survived the fall. Otyla took Mira in, but she eventually got forcibly removed from her by locals. Mira was also the one who wrote the "mayor's" letter. When the sisters return to Mira's home in the village a badly wounded Helena is being carried into the village. Šarlota, a trained nurse, and Mira try to help the dying Helena. However, Anna and Tomáš try to stop the sisters from touching Helena and yell for blessed salt. During the confrontation, Helena dies, and the sisters run back to Šarlota's cabin, followed by screams of accusations of being witches.

Tomáš becomes convinced that Šarlota and Mira kidnapped his sons. Before Šarlota and Mira can leave, Tomáš, Anna and more locals arrive at the cabin. Mira is bound and Šarlota is tortured while the locals demand to know where the children are. Eventually, Tomáš and other locals go outside to search while Anna interrogates the sisters. In the distance, Anna sees her children, runs after them, and gets mistakenly shot by a local. Šarlota manages to run away. Tomáš returns, sees the wounded Anna, accuses Mira of being at fault, sets the cabin ablaze and leaves the bound Mira inside. Šarlota returns with Rado, rescues an unconscious Mira from the flames and attempts to resuscitate her.

Some time later, Mira and Šarlota run happily through a forest. They eventually undress, jump into a lake and swim.

== Cast ==
- Natalia Germani as Šarlota
- Eva Mores as Mira
- Juliana Oľhová as Helena
- Zuzana Konečná as Žofa
- Marek Geišberg as Tomáš
- Peter Ondrejička as Juro
- Noël Czuczor as Rado
- Jana Oľhová as Anna
- Iva Bittová as Otyla
- Matúš Ryšan as Adam

== Critical reception ==
The film generated positive reviews with an approval rating of 100% based on 14 reviews on Rotten Tomatoes.
