= StarDance (Czech TV series) season 6 =

StarDance
- Season 6
- Celebrity winner: Anna Polívková
- Professional winner: Michal Kurtiš
- No. of episodes: 8

Release
- Original network: Česká televize
- Original release: November 2 – December 21, 2013

Season chronology
- ← Previous; Season 5 Next → Season 7

The sixth season of StarDance (Czech Republic) debuted on Česká televize on November 2, 2013. Eight celebrities were paired with eight professional ballroom dancers. Marek Eben and Tereza Kostková were the hosts for this season.

== Couples ==
The eight professionals and celebrities that competed were:

Celebrity	Occupation / Known for	Professional partner	Status
Jitka Hosprová	Violoncellist	Lukáš Bartuněk	Eliminated 1st on November 9, 2013
Pavel Řezníček	Actor	Lucie Hunčárová	Eliminated 2nd on November 16, 2013
Šárka Kašpárková	Triple jumper	Jan Tománek	Eliminated 3rd on November 23, 2013
Ondřej Brzobohatý	Actor, singer	Eva Krejčířová	Eliminated 4th on November 30, 2013
Matěj Ruppert	Actor, singer	Alice Stodůlková	Eliminated 5th on December 7, 2013
Imrich Bugár	Discus thrower	Jitka Šorfová	Third place on December 14, 2013
Taťána Kuchařová	Miss World 2006	Jan Onder	Runner-up on December 21, 2013
Anna Polívková	Actress	Michal Kurtiš	Winner on December 21, 2013

== Scoring Chart ==
Couples	Place	1	2	3	4	5	6	7	8
Anna & Michal	1	20	22	37	32	24+0=24	32+39=71	36+38=74	40+36+40=116
Taťána & Jan O.	2	28	30	33	40	35+0=35	37+34=71	39+40=79	38+40+40=118
Imrich & Jitka Š.	3	19	23	26	26	24+0=24	26+23=49	25+28=53	
Matěj & Alice	4	22	24	24	34	34+1=35	33+33=66		
Ondřej & Eva	5	24	26	30	33	33+2=35			
Šárka & Jan T.	6	18	20	24	22				
Pavel & Lucie	7	19	23	26					
Jitka H. & Lukáš	8	21	19						

Red numbers indicate the lowest score for each week.
Green numbers indicate the highest score for each week.
indicates the couple eliminated that week.
indicates the winning couple.
indicates the runner-up couple.

=== Average score chart ===
This table only counts for dances scored on a 40-point scale.

Rank by average	Place	Couple	Total points	Number of dances	Average
1	2	Taťána & Jan O.	434	12	36.2
2	1	Anna & Michal	396	12	33.0
3	5	Ondřej & Eva	146	5	29.2
4	4	Matěj & Alice	204	7	29.1
5	3	Imrich & Jitka Š.	220	9	24.4
6	7	Pavel & Lucie	68	3	22.7
7	6	Šárka & Jan T.	84	4	21.0
8	8	Jitka H. & Lukáš	40	2	20.0

=== Highest and lowest scoring performances ===
The best and worst performances in each dance according to the judges' 40-point scale are as follows:

Dance	Highest Scored dancer(s)	Highest score	Lowest Scored dancer(s)	Lowest score
Cha-cha-cha	Taťána Kuchařová	34	Jitka Hosprová	19
Waltz	Anna Polívková	40	Šárka Kašpárková	20
Quickstep	Taťána Kuchařová	35	Anna Polívková	20
Rumba	Taťána Kuchařová	40	Šárka Kašpárková	18
Jive	Anna Polívková	38	Šárka Kašpárková	24
Tango	Taťána Kuchařová	40	Matěj Ruppert	24
Slowfox	Taťána Kuchařová	40	Šárka Kašpárková	22
Paso Doble	Taťána Kuchařová	39	Imrich Bugár	25
Samba	Taťána Kuchařová	35	Anna Polívková; Imrich Bugár	24
Freestyle	Taťána Kuchařová; Anna Polívková	40	—	—

=== Couples' highest and lowest scoring dances ===
Scores are based upon a potential 40-point maximum.

Couples	Highest scoring dance(s)	Lowest scoring dance(s)
Anna & Michal	Waltz & Freestyle (40)	Quickstep (20)
Taťána & Jan O.	Slowfox, Tango, Rumba & Freestyle (40)	Rumba (28)
Imrich & Jitka Š.	Tango (28)	Rumba (19)
Matěj & Alice	Samba & Paso Doble (34)	Quickstep (22)
Ondřej & Eva	Samba & Paso Doble (33)	Quickstep (24)
Šárka & Jan T.	Jive (24)	Rumba (18)
Pavel & Lucie	Jive (26)	Rumba (19)
Jitka H. & Lukáš	Quickstep (21)	Cha-cha-cha (19)

== Dance chart ==
The celebrities and dance partners danced one of these routines for each corresponding week:

- Week 1: Rumba or quickstep
- Week 2: Cha-cha-cha or waltz
- Week 3: Jive or tango
- Week 4: Paso Doble or Slowfox
- Week 5: Samba and salsa
- Week 6: One unlearned dance
- Week 7: One unlearned dance
- Week 8: Couples' choice and freestyle

Couple	Week 1	Week 2	Week 3	Week 4	Week 5		Week 6		Week 7		Week 8		
Anna & Michal	Quickstep	Cha-cha-cha	Tango	Paso Doble	Samba	Salsa	Rumba	Waltz	Slowfox	Jive	Waltz	Jive	Freestyle
Taťána & Jan O.	Rumba	Waltz	Jive	Slowfox	Samba	Salsa	Quickstep	Cha-cha-cha	Paso Doble	Tango	Tango	Rumba	Freestyle
Imrich & Jitka Š.	Rumba	Waltz	Jive	Slowfox	Samba	Salsa	Quickstep	Cha-cha-cha	Paso Doble	Tango			
Matěj & Alice	Quickstep	Cha-cha-cha	Tango	Paso Doble	Samba	Salsa	Waltz	Rumba					
Ondřej & Eva	Quickstep	Cha-cha-cha	Tango	Paso Doble	Samba	Salsa							
Šárka & Jan T.	Rumba	Waltz	Jive	Slowfox									
Pavel & Lucie	Rumba	Waltz	Jive										
Jitka H. & Lukáš	Quickstep	Cha-cha-cha											

Highest scoring dance
Lowest scoring dance
