= Czech Lion Award for Best Short Film =

Czech film award

- Country: Czech Republic
- First award: 2020
- Currently held by: Dog and Wolf
- Website: https://www.filmovaakademie.cz

Czech Lion Award for Best Short Film is an award given to the best Czech animated film. It was established in 2020.

== Winners ==
Year	English Name	Original Name	Director
2020	Anatomy of a Czech Afternoon	Anatomie českého odpoledne	Adam Martinec
2021	Love, Dad	Milý tati	Diana Cam Van Nguyen
2022	Rites	Rituály	Damián Vondrášek
2023	Credentialing	Atestace	Jan Hecht
2024	Buzz of the Earth	Bzukot Země	Greta Stocklassa
2025	Dog and Wolf	Pes a vlk	Terézia Halamová
