= Czech Film Critics' Award for Best Documentary =

- Country: Czech Republic
- First award: 2010
- Currently held by: The Impossibility
- Website: filmovakritika.cz

Czech Film Critics' Award for Best Documentary is one of the awards given to the best Czech motion picture.

== Winners ==
Year	English Name	Original Name	Director
2010	Katka	Katka	Helena Třeštíková
2011	Solar Eclipse	Pod sluncem tma	Martin Mareček
2012	Love in the Grave	Láska v hrobě	David Vondráček
2013	Show!	Show!	Bohdan Bláhovec
2014	Into the Clouds We Gaze	K oblakům vzhlížíme	Martin Dušek
2015	Lean a Ladder Against Heaven	Opři žebřík o nebe	Jana Ševčíková
2016	Normal Autistic Film	Normální autistický film	Miroslav Janek
2017	This Is Not Me	Richard Müller: Nepoznaný	Miro Remo
2018	When the War Comes	Až přijde válka	Jan Gebert
2019	Over the Hills	Dálava	Martin Mareček
2020	Caught in the Net	V síti	Vít Klusák, Barbora Chalupová
2021	Intensive Life Unit	Jednotka intenzivního života	Adéla Komrzý
2022	Kapr Code	KaprKód	Lucie Králová
2023	Photophobia	Světloplachost	Ivan Ostrochovský, Pavol Pekarčík
2024	I'm Not Everything I Want to Be	Ještě nejsem, kým chci být	Klára Tasovská
2025	The Impossibility	Dům bez východu	Tomáš Hlaváček
