= Zlatá labuť =

- Genre: Historical drama; Romance
- Directed by: Braňo Holiček; Biser A. Arichtev; Petr Nikolaev
- Starring: Marta Dancingerová; Adam Vacula; Kristýna Ryška; Robert Mikluš; Beáta Kaňoková; Simona Lewandowská; Krystof Bartos; Marek Kristián Hochman
- Country of origin: Czech Republic
- Original language: Czech
- No. of seasons: 3
- No. of episodes: 56

Production
- Running time: 60 minutes

Original release
- Network: TV Nova
- Release: 2023 – 2024

Zlatá labuť (English title: The Department Store, literally The Golden Swan) is a Czech television series written and produced by Filip Bobiňski, Jan Coufal and Petr Šizling. It was created by Dramedy Productions for TV Nova. First episode premiered on Voyo on 26 January 2023. It is set in the department store of the era of the Protectorate of Bohemia and Moravia. Starring Marta Dancingerová, Beáta Kaňoková, Simona Lewandovská, Kristýna Ryška, Adam Vacula, Robert Mikluš, Petr Kostka, Daniela Kolářová, Tomáš Töpfer, Michaela Maurerová and others. The series was renewed for season 2 which started shooting in May 2023. First season had average rating 820,000 (21.2% share). The series was renewed for third and final season.

== Synopsis ==
Bára Veselá is constantly pursued by bad luck and is on the run from the law. By chance, she unwillingly becomes a salesperson for the fashion department at the newly opened department store, Zlatá labuť (Golden Swan). This store is a magnificent palace of luxury and is a new modern landmark in the center of Prague. The store holds a rich history behind its opulent storefronts. It is March 15, 1939, and German occupation forces are invading the Czechoslovak state. Zlatá labuť is ruled by the Kučera family led by uncompromising patriarch of the family Rudolf. His wife Božena provides the calm strength of the family. They have a daughter and two sons. The oldest is Rudolf jr. who is a wheelchair user after polio, while the youngest is Petr. Petr is a somewhat troubled family rebel who finds liking in Bára. However, their sister Irena is an intriguer and lover of luxury and power. She lives in an estranged relationship with her husband Lukáš. Irena is decided to fight for the leadership of the family clan.

== Production ==
First season was filmed in 2022 and 2023. It was produced by Dramedy Production and directed by Braňo Holiček and Biser A. Arichtev. In Prague's Kbely, several sections of a department store were created on an area of over 2,500 square meters for filming. Filming concluded in January 2023 while series started broadcast on 2 February 2024. In May 2024 the season 2 started filming . Petr Nikolaev became third director of the series. Start of broadcast was set for 22 June 2023. In November 2023 shooting of season 3 was confirmed. Season 3 is the final season.

== Cast and characters ==
- Marta Dancingerová as Bára Veselá
- Adam Vacula as Petr Kučera
- Kristýna Ryška as Irena Mašková
- Robert Mikluš as Lukáš Mašek
- Beáta Kaňoková as Eva Dušková
- Simona Lewandowská as Alena Zimová
- Krystof Bartos as Martin Kantor
- Marek Kristián Hochman as Jakub Vrána
- Hana Kusnjerová as Valerie Horká
- Ema Businská as Kristýna Malá
- Vojtěch Vodochodský as Vojta
- Jan Dolanský as Marek Záhor
- Daniela Kolářová as Božena Kučerová
- Petr Kostka as Rudolf Kučera
- Petr Stach as Rudolf Kučera jr.
- Kamila Trnková as Marta Franková
- Pavel Řezníček as Václav Mach
- Vasil Fridrich as Karel Wágner
- Ladislav Hampl as Antonín Bouchner
- Gabriela Míčová as Magdalena Praxlová
- Tomáš Töpfer as Arne Pulkráb
- Robin Ferro as Kamil Pulkráb
- Adrian Jastraban as Vilém Maurer
- Lucie Štěpánková as Anna Maurerová
- Jacob Erftemeijer as Oldřich Skalský
- Roman Vojtek as Vilém „Willy“ Brož
- Jiří Bábek as Petr Dittrich
- Jitka Sedláčková as Hana Dittrichová
- Barbora Bočková as Markéta Dittrichová
- Leona Skleničková as Ester Maurerová
- Kamila Trnková as Marta Franková
- Daniela Hirsh as Sára Hiršová
- Michaela Maurerová as Kateřina Holá-Malá
- Jiří Hána as Viktor Hess
- Ivan Lupták as Viktor Šolc
- Svatopluk Skopal as Josef Miller
- Kristýna Badinková as Lucie Tichá
- Adam Berka as Kryštof Tichý
- Vlastimil Fojtášek as pplk. Falcky / Abraham Hirsh
- Jaroslav Satoranský as Libor Kovář
- Veronika Čermák Macková as Milada Dubská

== Slovak adaptation ==
Markíza produced a series called Dunaj, k vašim službám (Dunaj, at your service) which is a Slovak version of Zlatá labuť.

== Episodes ==
=== Season 1 ===
Episode	Directed by	Written by	Original air date (Voyo)	Original air date (Nova)	Czech viewers (millions)
1	Braňo Holiček	Hana Roguljič, Jan Coufal	26 January 2023	2 February 2023	1,069
2	Braňo Holiček	Hana Roguljič, Jan Coufal	2 February 2023	9 February 2023	0.776
3	Braňo Holiček	Hana Roguljič, Jan Coufal	9 February 2023	16 February 2023	0.771
4	Biser A. Arichtev	Jan Coufal, Hana Roguljič	16 February 2023	23 February 2023	0.794
5	Biser A. Arichtev	Jan Coufal, Hana Roguljič	23 February 2023	2 March 2023	0.759
6	Biser A. Arichtev	Jan Coufal, Hana Roguljič	2 March 2023	9 March 2023	0.685
7	Braňo Holiček	Jan Coufal, Tomáš Jarkovský	9 March 2023	16 March 2023	0.762
8	Braňo Holiček	Jan Coufal, Hana Roguljič	16 March 2023	23 March 2023	0.678
9	Biser A. Arichtev	Jan Coufal, Eva G. Taubrová	23 March 2023	30 March 2023	0.717
10	Biser A. Arichtev	Jan Coufal, Hana Roguljič	30 March 2023	6 April 2023	0.734
11	Biser A. Arichtev	Jan Coufal, Hana Roguljič	6 April 2023	13 April 2023	0.710
12	Biser A. Arichtev	Jan Coufal, Barbara Bulvová	13 April 2023	20 April 2023	0.714
13	Biser A. Arichtev	Jan Coufal, Hana Roguljič	20 April 2023	27 April 2023	0.741
14	Braňo Holiček	Jan Coufal, Hana Roguljič	27 April 2023	4 May 2023	0.719
15	Braňo Holiček	Jan Coufal, Barbara Bulvová	4 May 2023	11 May 2023	0.717
16	Braňo Holiček	Jan Coufal, Tomáš Jarkovský	11 May 2023	18 May 2023	0.648
17	Braňo Holiček	Jan Coufal, Hana Roguljič	18 May 2023	25 May 2023	0.673
18	Biser A. Arichtev	Jan Coufal, Hana Roguljič	25 May 2023	1 June 2023	0.604
19	Biser A. Arichtev	Jan Coufal, Eva G. Taubrová	1 June 2023	8 June 2023	0.657
20	Biser A. Arichtev	Jan Coufal	8 June 2023	15 June 2023	0.645
21	Biser A. Arichtev	Jan Coufal	15 June 2023	22 June 2023	0.630

=== Season 2 ===
Episode	Directed by	Written by	Original air date (Voyo)	Original air date (Nova)	Czech viewers (millions)
1	Biser A. Arichtev	Jan Coufal	17 August 2023	24 August 2023	0.586
2	Biser A. Arichtev	Jan Coufal	24 August 2023	31 August 2023	0.588
3	Braňo Holiček	Jan Coufal	31 August 2023	7 September 2023	0.568
4	Braňo Holiček	Jan Coufal, Hana Roguljič	7 September 2023	14 September 2023	0.638
5	Braňo Holiček	Jan Coufal	14 September 2023	21 September 2023	0.628
6	Braňo Holiček	Jan Coufal, Hana Roguljič	21 September 2023	28 September 2023	0.549
7	Braňo Holiček	Jan Coufal	28 September 2023	5 October 2023	0.643
8	Braňo Holiček	Jan Coufal	5 October 2023	12 October 2023	0.586
9	Braňo Holiček	Jan Coufal	12 October 2023	19 October 2023	0.648
10	Braňo Holiček	Jan Coufal	19 October 2023	26 October 2023	0.654
11	Braňo Holiček	Jan Coufal	26 October 2023	2 November 2023	0.646
12	Braňo Holiček	Jan Coufal	2 November 2023	9 November 2023	0.621
13	Biser A. Arichtev	Jan Coufal	9 November 2023	16 November 2023	0.640
14	Biser A. Arichtev	Jan Coufal	16 November 2023	23 November 2023	0.696
15	Biser A. Arichtev	Jan Coufal	23 November 2023	30 November 2023	0.679
16	Biser A. Arichtev	Jan Coufal	30 November 2023	7 December 2023	0.733
17	Biser A. Arichtev	Jan Coufal	7 December 2023	14 December 2023	0.682

=== Season 3 ===
Episode	Directed by	Written by	Original air date (Voyo)	Original air date (Nova)	Czech viewers (millions)
1	Braňo Holiček	Hana Roguljič	1 February 2024	8 February 2024	0.575
2	Braňo Holiček	Hana Roguljič, Tomáš Jarkovský	8 February 2024	15 February 2024	0.571
3	Braňo Holiček	Hana Roguljič, Michaela Doležalová	15 February 2024	22 February 2024	0.522
4	Braňo Holiček	Hana Roguljič, Vanda Zaplatílková Hutařová	22 February 2024	29 February 2024	0.545
5	Biser A. Arichtev	Hana Roguljič, Eva G. Taubrová	29 February 2024	7 March 2024	0.533
6	Biser A. Arichtev	Hana Roguljič, Michaela Doležalová	7 March 2024	14 March 2024	0.499
7	Biser A. Arichtev	Hana Roguljič, Vanda Zaplatílková Hutařová	14 March 2024	21 March 2024	0.498
8	Biser A. Arichtev	Hana Roguljič	21 March 2024	28 March 2024	0.528
9	Braňo Holiček	Hana Roguljič, Vanda Zaplatílková Hutařová	28 March 2024	4 April 2024	0.503
10	Braňo Holiček	Hana Roguljič, Vanda Zaplatílková Hutařová	4 April 2024	11 April 2024	0.550
11	Braňo Holiček	Hana Roguljič, Eva G. Taubrová	11 April 2024	18 April 2024	0.530
12	Braňo Holiček	Hana Roguljič, Michaela Doležalová	18 April 2024	25 April 2024	0.492
13	Biser A. Arichtev	Hana Roguljič	25 April 2024	2 May 2024	0.530
14	Biser A. Arichtev	Hana Roguljič	2 May 2024	9 May 2024	0.476
15	Biser A. Arichtev	Hana Roguljič	9 May 2024	16 May 2024	0.510
16	Biser A. Arichtev	Hana Roguljič	16 May 2024	23 May 2024	0.360
17	Biser A. Arichtev	Hana Roguljič	23 May 2024	30 May 2024	0.528
18	Biser A. Arichtev	Hana Roguljič	30 May 2024	6 June 2024	0.556
