= 2025 Stockholm International Film Festival =

36th edition of Stockholm film festival

- Official poster
- Opening film: Eagles of the Republic by Tarik Saleh
- Closing film: Die My Love by Lynne Ramsay
- Location: Stockholm, Sweden
- Founded: 1990
- Awards: Bronze Horse
- Artistic director: Beatrice Karlsson
- No. of films: 135 films from 60 countries
- Festival date: Opening: 5 November 2025; Closing: 16 November 2025
- Website: SIFF 2025

Stockholm International Film Festival
- 2026 2024

The 36th Stockholm International Film Festival took place from 5 to 16 November 2025 in Stockholm, Sweden. The festival opened with Eagles of the Republic by Tarik Saleh. The theme of this edition was "Be Kind Rewind" and Germany was this year's 'Focus Country' and had screening of 2025 German drama films Sound of Falling and Miroirs No. 3 by Mascha Schilinski and Christian Petzold respectively and new works by Lauro Cress and Joscha Bongard.

This year's festival was dedicated to the memory of David Lynch, American filmmaker, visual artist, musician, and actor, who passed away on 15 January 2025. The festival honored his legacy through retrospectives, discussions, and curated screenings that highlighted his impact on cinema and the people.

The winners were presented on 14 November 2025 during the award ceremony at the Rigoletto cinema. This year's Bronze Horse for Best Film went to Slovakia's Oscar submission Father, by Tereza Nvotová. The festival officially closed on 16 November with Die My Love by Lynne Ramsay.

== Jury ==
=== Stockholm Competition ===
- Eva Åkergren, Swedish producer (jury chair)
- David Dencik, Swedish-Danish actor
- Mikael Marcimain, Swedish film and television director

=== Stockholm Documentary Competition ===
- Sara Rüster, works at Swedish Film Institute and is responsible for the launch and festival distribution of Swedish documentaries
- Brynhildur Þórarinsdóttir, Icelandic-Swedish producer
- Kasia Syty, philologist, cultural journalist, and translator

=== Short Film Competition ===
- Lia Hietala is a Swedish film director and screenwriter
- Elis Monteverde Burrau, poet, playwright, artist
- Julia Thelin, screenwriter and director

=== FIPRESCI jury ===
- Leonardo Goi, a film critic and columnist for MUBI Notebook.
- Stephen “Spling” Aspeling, a South African film critic, script consultant, and radio presenter
- Julia Finnsiö, a Swedish film critic

=== TV4 Rising Star Award ===
- Simon Norrthon, Swedish actor, jury chair
- Lisa Rosengren Lagercrantz, Film & TV Producers Association
- Jan Göransson, Head of Press, Swedish Film Institute
- Adam Lundgren, Swedish actor
- Celie Sparre, Swedish actress

== Official selection ==
=== Opening and closing films ===
English title	Original title	Director(s)	Production countrie(s)
Opening film
Eagles of the Republic		Tarik Saleh	Sweden, France, Denmark, Finland
Closing film
Die My Love		Lynne Ramsay	United States

=== Stockholm Competition ===
The following films were selected for the main international competition:

English title	Original title	Director(s)	Production countrie(s)
Alpha		Julia Ducournau	France, Belgium
DJ Ahmet		Georgi M. Unkovski	North Macedonia, Czech Republic, Serbia, Croatia
Egghead Republic		Pella Kågerman and Hugo Lilja	Sweden
Father	Otec	Tereza Nvotová	Slovakia, Czech Republic, Poland
Forastera		Lucía Aleñar Iglesias	Spain, Italy, Sweden
Hijra	هجری	Shahad Ameen	Saudi Arabia, Iraq, Egypt, United Kingdom
If I Had Legs I'd Kick You		Mary Bronstein	United States
Left-Handed Girl	左撇子女孩	Shih-Ching Tsou	Taiwan, France, United States, United Kingdom
The Little Sister	La Petite Dernière	Hafsia Herzi	France, Germany
Lucky Lu	幸福之路	Lloyd Lee Choi	Canada, United States
Perla		Alexandra Makarová	Austria, Slovakia
Pillion		Harry Lighton	United Kingdom, Ireland
The President's Cake	مملكة القصب	Hasan Hadi	Iraq, United States, Qatar
Reedland	Rietland	Sven Bresser	Netherlands, Belgium
The Secret Agent	O Agente Secreto	Kleber Mendonça Filho	Brazil, France, Germany, Netherlands
Sorry, Baby		Eva Victor	United States
Sound of Falling	In die Sonne schauen	Mascha Schilinski	Germany
Train Dreams		Clint Bentley	United States
Where the Wind Comes From		Amel Guellaty	Tunisia, France, Qatar

=== Stockholm Documentary Competition ===
The following films were selected for the documentary competition:

English title	Original title	Director(s)	Production countrie(s)
2000 Meters to Andriivka	2000 метрів до Андріївки	Mstyslav Chernov	Ukraine, United States
Afterlives		Kevin B. Lee	Belgium, France, Germany
All I Had Was Nothingness	Je n'avais que le néant – "Shoah" par Lanzmann	Guillaume Ribot	France
An American Pastoral	Une pastorale américaine	Auberi Edler	France
André Is an Idiot		Tony Benna	United States
Below the Clouds	Sotto le nuvole	Gianfranco Rosi	Italy
Cover-Up		Laura Poitras, Mark Obenhaus	United States
The Golden Spurtle		Constantine Costi	Australia, United Kingdom
ILOVERUSS		Tova Mozard	Sweden
Letters from Wolf Street	Listy z Wilczej	Arjun Talwar	Poland, Germany
Orwell: 2+2=5		Raoul Peck	France, United States
Remake		Ross McElwee	United States
The Stringer		Bao Nguyen	United States
Zodiac Killer Project		Charlie Shackleton	United States, United Kingdom

=== Masters ===
The following films were selected in the Masters section (most experienced directors and profiled voices from the world of films):

English title	Original title	Director(s)	Production countrie(s)
Die My Love		Lynne Ramsay	United States
Ghost Elephants		Werner Herzog	United States
The Mastermind		Kelly Reichardt	United States, United Kingdom
Miroirs No. 3		Christian Petzold	Germany
No Other Choice	어쩔수가없다	Park Chan-wook	South Korea
Peter Hujar's Day		Ira Sachs	United States, Argentina, Spain, United Kingdom, Germany
The Smashing Machine		Benny Safdie	United States
The Stranger	L'Étranger	François Ozon	France
Two Prosecutors	Два прокурора	Sergei Loznitsa	Latvia, France, Germany, Netherlands, Romania, Lithuania
Yakushima's Illusion	L'Illusion de Yakushima	Naomi Kawase	France, Japan, Belgium, Luxembourg

=== Open Zone ===
The following films were selected in the Open Zone section (FIPRESCI award):

English title	Original title	Director(s)	Production countrie(s)
Babystar		Joscha Bongard	Germany
The Blue Trail	O Último Azul	Gabriel Mascaro	Brazil, Chile, Mexico, Netherlands
Eagles of the Republic		Tarik Saleh	Sweden, France, Denmark, Finland
Ky Nam Inn	Quán Kỳ Nam	Leon Le	Vietnam
The Message	El mensaje	Iván Fund	Argentina, Spain, Uruguay
Mile End Kicks		Chandler Levack	Canada
The Sun Rises on Us All	日掛中天	Cai Shangjun	China
The Things You Kill		Alireza Khatami	France, Canada, Poland, Singapore, Turkey
Two Seasons, Two Strangers	旅と日々	Sho Miyake	Japan
What Marielle Knows	Was Marielle weiß	Frédéric Hambalek	Germany

=== Icons ===
The following films were selected in the Icon section (where the biggest stars shine the brightest):

English title	Original title	Director(s)	Production countrie(s)
Anemone		Ronan Day-Lewis	United Kingdom, United States
The Ballad of Wallis Island		James Griffiths	United Kingdom
Blue Moon		Richard Linklater	United States, Ireland
Christy		David Michôd	United States
The Last Viking	Den Sidste Viking	Anders Thomas Jensen	Sweden, Denmark
Eternity		David Freyne	United States
Is This Thing On?		Bradley Cooper	United States, United Kingdom
Jay Kelly		Noah Baumbach	United States, Italy, United Kingdom
Jimpa		Sophie Hyde	United States, Australia, Netherlands
Kiss of the Spider Woman		Bill Condon	United States, Mexico
Late Fame		Kent Jones	United States
Rebuilding		Max Walker-Silverman	United States
Rental Family		Hikari	United States, Japan

=== American Independents ===
The following films were selected in the American Independents section (America as seen through the most independent of filmmaking eyes):

English title	Original title	Director(s)	Production countrie(s)
The Baltimorons		Jay Duplass	United States
East of Wall		Kate Beecroft	United States
Fior Di Latte		Charlotte Linden Ercoli Coe	United States, Italy
Lurker		Alex Russell	United States
Mad Bills to Pay (or Destiny, dile que no soy malo)		Joel Alfonso Vargas	United States
Magic Farm		Amalia Ulman	United States, Argentina, United Kingdom
Omaha		Cole Webley	United States
Plainclothes		Carmen Emmi	United States, United Kingdom
Splitsville		Michael Angelo Covino	United States
Sunfish (& Other Stories on Green Lake)		Sierra Falconer	United States
Twinless		James Sweeney	United States

=== Discovery ===
The following films were selected in the Discovery section (stories from debuting directors):

English title	Original title	Director(s)	Production countrie(s)
Before/After	Avant/Après	Manoël Dupont	Belgium
Caravan	Karavan	Zuzana Kirchnerová	Czech Republic, Slovakia, Italy
The Devil Smokes (and Saves the Burnt Matches in the Same Box)	El diablo fuma	Ernesto Martínez Bucio	Mexico
Impatience of the Heart	Ungeduld des Herzens	Lauro Cress	Germany
Little Trouble Girls	Kaj ti je deklica	Urška Djukić	Slovenia, Italy, Croatia, Serbia
The Plague		Charlie Polinger	United States, Australia, Romania
Silent Rebellion	À bras-le-corps	Marie-Elsa Sgualdo	Belgium, France, Switzerland
Sugarland		Isabella Brunäcker	Austria
Vanilla	Vainilla	Mayra Hermosillo	Mexico

=== Twilight Zone ===
The following films were selected in the Twilight Zone section (Innovative, terrifying and twisted genre films):

English title	Original title	Director(s)	Production countrie(s)
The Book of Sijjin and Illyyin	Kitab Sijjin & Illiyyin	Hadrah Daeng Ratu	Indonesia
Honey Bunch		Madeleine Sims-Fewer, Dusty Mancinelli	Canada
Mārama		Taratoa Stappard	New Zealand, United Kingdom
Mother of Flies		John Adams, Zelda Adams, Toby Poser	United States
Mother's Baby		Johanna Moder	Germany
The Python Hunt		Xander Robin	United States
Rabbit Trap		Bryn Chainey	United States, United Kingdom
Reflection in a Dead Diamond		Hélène Cattet and Bruno Forzani	Belgium, Luxembourg, Italy, France
Tinsman Road		Robbie Banfitch	United States
The Virgin of the Quarry Lake	La Virgen de la Tosquera	Laura Casabe	Argentina, Mexico, Spain

=== Stockholm Series ===
English title	Original title	Creator(s)	Network	Production countrie(s)
The Death of Bunny Munro		Isabella Eklöf	Sky Atlantic	United Kingdom
The Narrow Road to the Deep North		Justin Kurzel, Shaun Grant	Prime Video	Australia
Popular Problems	Populära problem	Ernst de Geer, Sissela Benn	SVT1	Sweden
We Come in Peace	Vi kommer i fred	Mani Maserrat-Agah, Jens Jonsson	TV4	Sweden

=== Short Film Competition ===
==== Nordic Shorts ====
- Sorry I'm Late (But I Brought A Choir) (Dette er ikke en fest (det er en vinkveld)), Håkon Anton, Norway
- Closed Oysters Can't Speak, Leonard Rääf, Denmark, Italy
- Fish Out of Water
- Maybe in March, Mikkel Bjørn Kehlert, Denmark
- My Name Is Hope, Sherwan Haji, Finland

==== Short Film Program: Bodies Bodies Bodies ====
- Skin on Skin by Simon Schneckenburger
- Agapito by Arvin Belarmino and Kyla Danelle Romero
- The Body by Louris van de Geer
- Unsold Copies by Stefan Koutzev

==== Short Film Program: Faces Places ====
- When The Geese Flew by Arthur Gay
- Baozhda by Keran Abukasimu
- The Loneliness of Lizards by Inês Nunes
- I'm Glad You're Dead Now by Tawfeek Barhom

== Awards ==
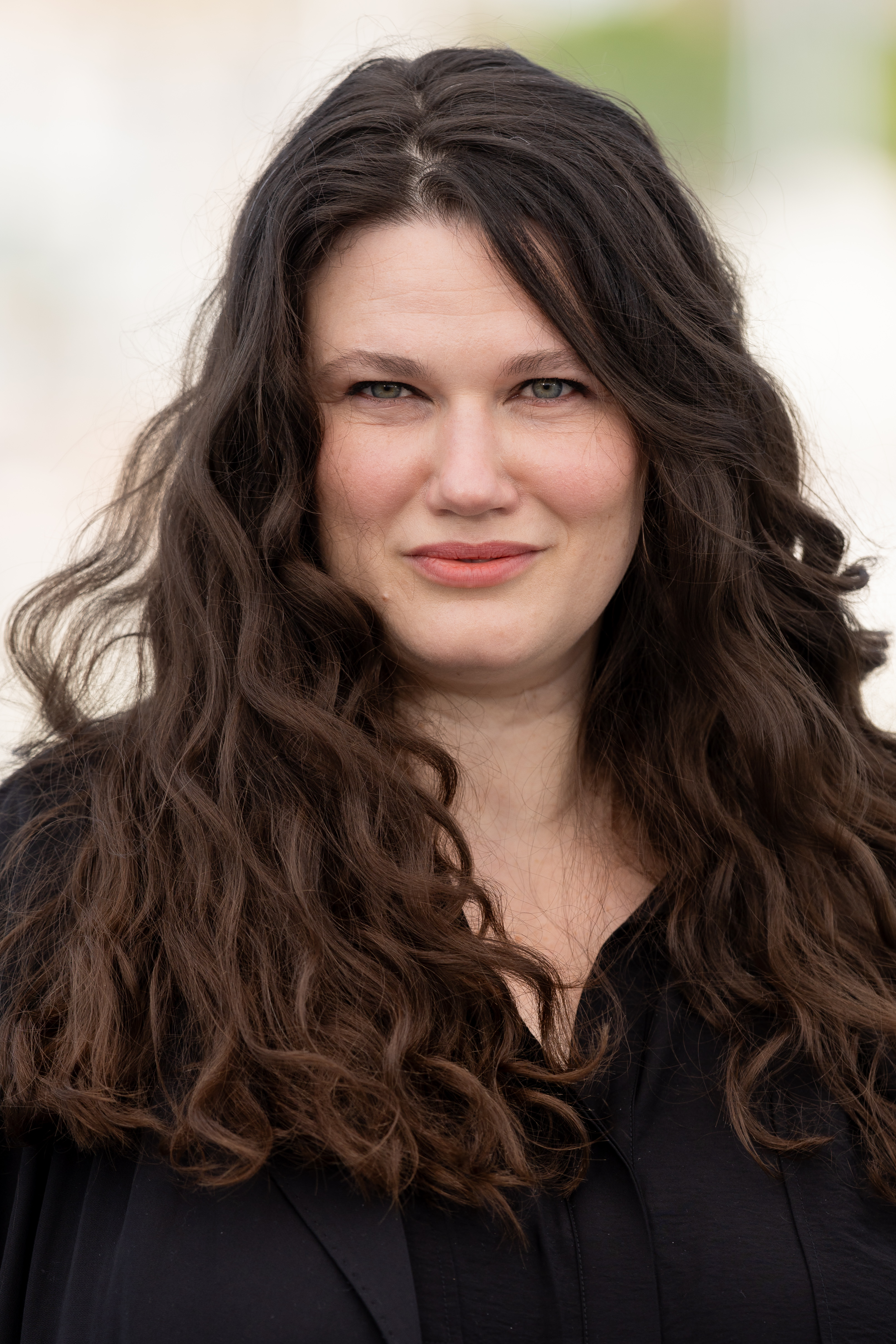
Mascha Schillinski, winner of the Best Director Award

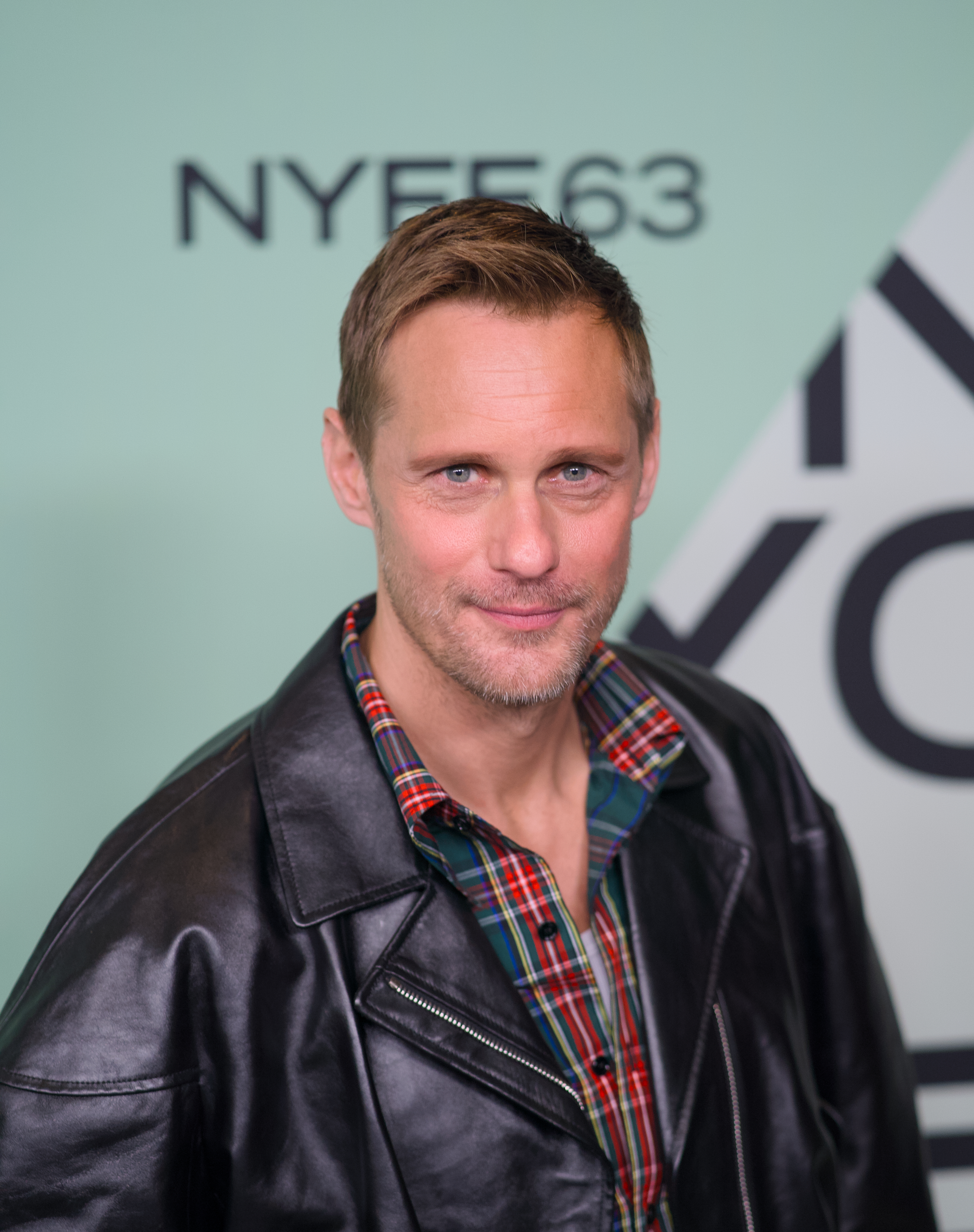
Alexander Skarsgård, recipient of Stockholm Achievement Award

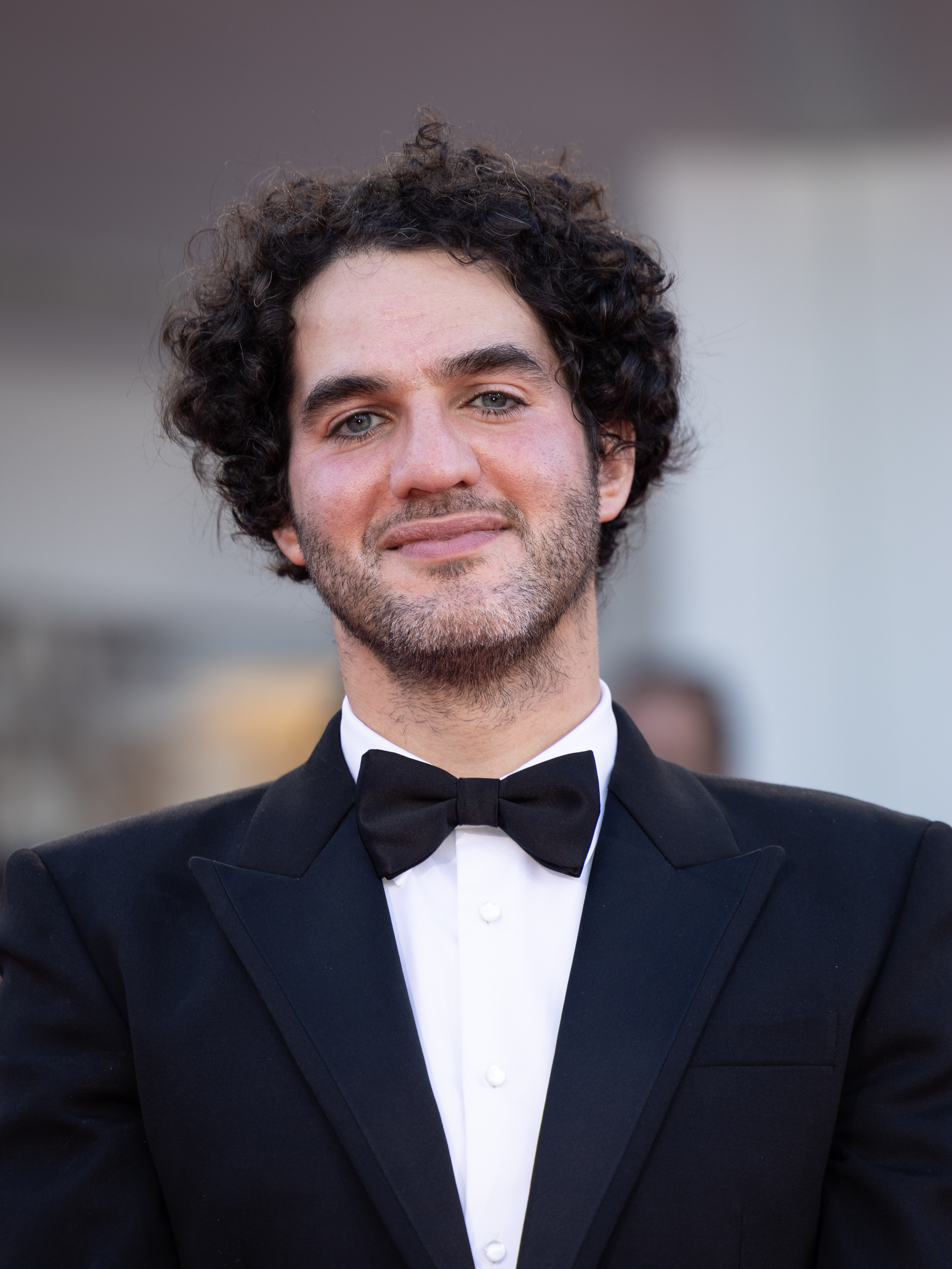
Benny Safdie, recipient of Stockholm Visionary Award

=== Bronze Horse ===
- Best Film: Father by Tereza Nvotová
- Best Director: Mascha Schillinski for Sound of Falling
- Best Actor: Harry Melling for Pillion
- Best Actress: Shih Yuan Ma for Left-Handed Girl
- Best Screenplay: Dusan Budzak and Tereza Nvotová for Father
- Best Debut: Hasan Hadi for The President's Cake
- Best Cinematography: Evgenia Alexandrova for The Secret Agent
- Best Documentary: 2000 Meters to Andriivka by Mstyslav Chernov
- Best Short Film: Skin on Skin by Simon Schneckenburger

=== Stockholm Achievement Award ===
- Alexander Skarsgård, Swedish actor

=== Visionary Award ===
- Benny Safdie, American filmmaker and actor

=== FIPRESCI Award ===
- Best Film: No Other Choice by Park Chan-wook

=== Nordic Shorts Competition ===
- Best Short Film: Sorry I'm Late (But I Brought a Choir) by Håkon Anton Olavsen

=== TV4 Rising Star Award ===
- Nils Wetterholm

=== Stockholm Film Critics Award ===
- Stig Björkman, Swedish writer and film critic

=== Peroni 0.0% Audience Award ===
- Egghead Republic
