= Kukačky =

- Genre: Comedy, Drama
- Written by: Jan Coufal
- Directed by: Biser A. Arichtev
- Starring: David Novotný, Sabina Remundová, Marek Adamczyk, Marta Dancingerová, Jiří Štrébl
- Country of origin: Czech Republic
- Original language: Czech
- No. of seasons: 2
- No. of episodes: 26

Production
- Running time: 52 minutes

Original release
- Network: ČT1
- Release: 2021

Kukačky (English: The Swap; lit. "Cuckoos") is a Czech family comedy-drama series developed and produced by Dramedy Productions for Czech Television. The plot centres on Jakub and Tomáš, two children who were accidentally swapped at the hospital. The first series began broadcasting on 8 January 2021 on ČT1, and as of May 2024 two seasons have been aired.

== Cast ==
=== Kadlec and Býček family ===
- Viktor Sekanina as Jakub Kadlec
- Marek Adamczyk as Martin Kadlec, Jakub's father Tomáš real father
- Marta Dancingerová as Tereza Kadlecová (née Býčková), Jakub's mother Tomáš real mother
- Jiří Štrébl as Libor Kadlec, Martin's father
- Veronika Freimanová as Klára Kadlecová, Martin's mother
- Luboš Veselý as Rudolf Býček, Tereza's father
- Petr Kostka as Vladimír Býček, Rudolf's father, Tereza's grandfather Terezy
- Libuše Švormová as Jindřiška Býčková, Rudolf's father mother, Tereza's grandmother

=== Holec family ===
- Theo Schaefer as Tomáš Holec
- David Novotný as Karel Holec, Tomáš' father Jakub real father
- Sabina Remundová as Olga Holcová, Tomáš' mother Jakub real mother *Darija Pavlovičová as Bára Holcová, Karel and Olga's daughter
- Denisa Barešová as Marcela Holcová, Karel and Olga's daughter
- Michal Isteník as David Holec, Karel's brother

=== Others ===
- Klára Cibulková as MUDr. Kateřina Firstová
- Jan Dolanský as MUDr. Pavel Tesař
- Jitka Čvančarová / Eva Hacurová as Kamila Tesařová
- Štěpán Benoni as Hynek
- Adam Ernest as Luboš Richtrmoc
- Filip Čapka as Josef Máca
- Helena Dvořáková as Květa Richtrmocová
- Petr Štěpán as Dušan Richtrmoc
- Adéla Petřeková as Jana
- Vilém Udatný as Libor Nerad
- Ondřej Kraus as Ondřej Fuchs
- Anette Nesvadbová as Petra Fuchsová
- David Máj as kpt. Zdeněk Remeš
- Natálie Řehořová as Mgr. Lenka Malá
- Andrea Daňková as Veronika
- Lucie Žáčková as Veronika
- Antonio Šoposki as Marek Richter
- Zdeněk Julina as MUDr. Jan Vostrčil
- Daniel Svoboda as Josef Pádivý

== Synopsis ==
The plot focuses on Jakub and Tomáš, children who got swapped in hospital.

== Episodes ==
Season	Episodes	Originally aired	
Season	Episodes	First aired	Last aired
1	13	8 January 2021	2 April 2021
2	13	20 January 2023	14 April 2023

== Release ==
The Swap was aired on ČT1 from 8 January 2021.

In March 2021, ČT program director Milan Fridrich confirmed the planned preparations for the continuation of the series; in early July 2022, at the Karlovy Vary Film Festival, ČT announced that filming of the second season was already underway (again under the direction of Biser A. Arichtev) and revealed that by new characters will be added to the plot while Holec and Kadlec families will live opposite each other. The second series of Cuckoos with thirteen parts, presented on 11 January 2023 in the Municipal Library of Prague, was broadcast by Czech Television on 20 January of the same year.

== Reception ==
The last episode of the first season premiered on 2 April 2021. Season 1 was very successful, with an average rating 1.7 million viewers over the age of 15, a share of 36.50%.
