= Antonie Formanová =

Czech actress

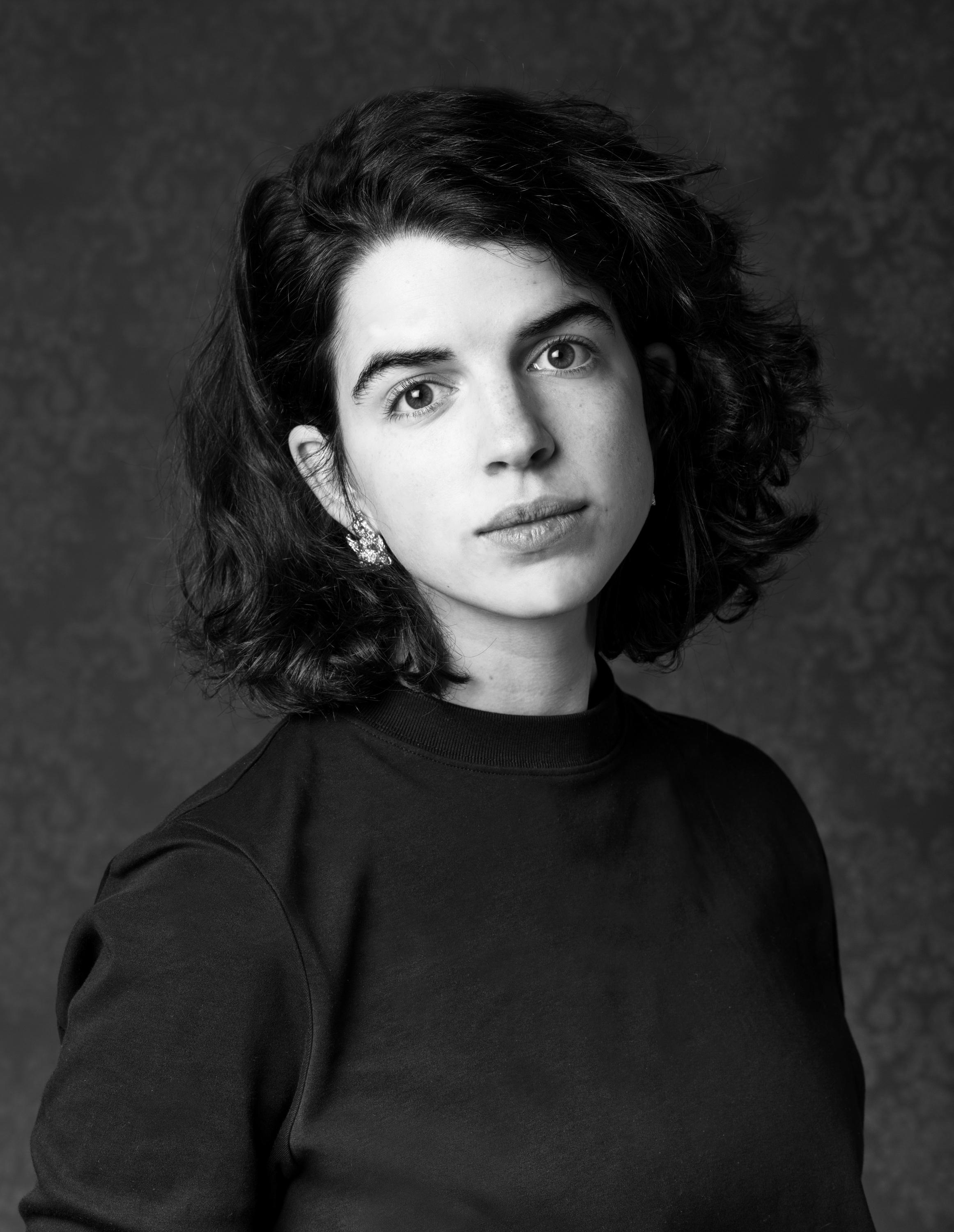
- Formanová in 2023
- Born: 30 June 1998 (age 26); Prague, Czech Republic
- Occupation: Actress
- Years active: 2018– present

Antonie Formanová (born 30 June 1998) is a Czech actress. She starred in Dukla 61.

== Biography ==
Tree of Forman family

Born in Prague as the youngest of three sisters, Antonie is a daughter of Czech actor Petr Forman and granddaughter of Miloš Forman and Jiří Stránský (which was a grandson of Czech politician Jan Malypetr).

In 2016, Antonie directed a student film named Martin. In 2017, she started studying at the Theatre Faculty of the Academy of Performing Arts in Prague, from which she earned a BcA. degree (equivalent to Bachelor of Fine Arts) three years later. In a 2018 TV film A Pilot Tale, based on a novel by Jiří Stránský, she played the main character's daughter, in fact her own grandmother.

Formanová was awarded the Czech Lion Award for Best Supporting Actress for her role in the 2021 film Occupation.

In 2024 the Czech edition of Forbes featured Formanová in their 30 under 30 list: 30 of the most talented Czechs under 30 years old.
