= Tereza Nvotová =

Slovak filmmaker

Tereza Nvotova
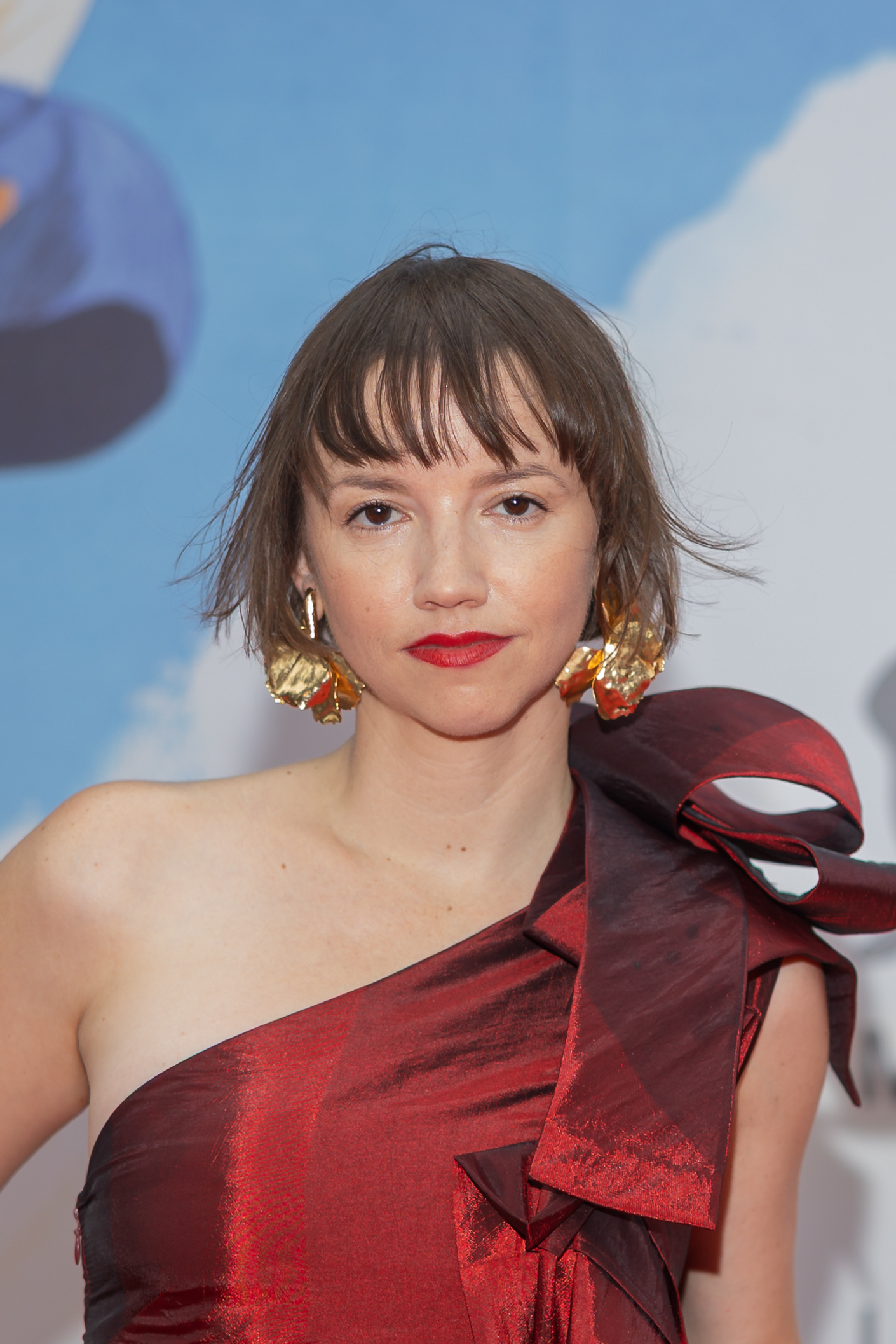
- Nvotová in 2025
- Born: 22 January 1988 (age 38); Trnava, Czechoslovakia
- Occupations: Director; screenwriter; actress
- Years active: 2007–present

Tereza Nvotová (born 22 January 1988) is a Slovak director, screenwriter and actress. She is known for films such as Father (2025, premiered in Venice Film Festival), Nightsiren (2022, winner of Golden Leopard at Locarno), Filthy (2017) and the documentary The Lust For Power (2017).

== Biography ==
Nvotová was born in Trnava. She is the daughter of director Juraj Nvota and actress Anna Šišková. Her sister, Dorota Nvotová. Her husband is American actor Jacob Pitts. She studied at the Film and TV School of the Academy of Performing Arts in Prague (FAMU) where she now teaches directing.

== Career as director ==
Nvotová's third feature Father (2025) was premiered at Venice Film Festival and won the Golden Eye at the Zurich Film Festival, the Bronze Horse at the Stockholm Film Festival, Slovak Academy Award Sun in a Net for Directing and Best Film, Czech Film Critics Award for Directing, Golden Orange for Directing at Antalya, Best Actor at Palm Springs and Les Arcs and more. Father was selected as Slovakia's entry for the Oscars and was released in numerous countries.

With her sophomore feature Nightsiren (2022), she won a Golden Leopard at the Locarno Film Festival and Silver Melies at Sitges Film Festival.

Her first feature Filthy was released in 2017 and won more than 20 awards at festivals worldwide, including Czech Film Critics Award for the best film, and Czech Film Academy Award for the best editing. As a documentarian, she confronted corruption and politics in her HBO documentary The Lust For Power, which was released the same year, and was awarded the Trilobit Award from the Czech Film and Television Union.

In 2020 she made a short for Czech Television "New York City in the Time of COVID-19".

Nvotová teaches students of direction at Prague film school FAMU.

She is represented by UTA, Independent Talent Group and Brillstein Entertainment Partners.

She lives in Prague and New York. In 2018, Forbes magazine had also ranked Tereza Nvotova among the 30 most influential people under 30 in Slovakia.

Nvotová directed and co-wrote the TV series Our People with Miro Šifra. The show won the development prize at the 2024 Series Mania Forum Co-Pro Pitching Sessions.

== Selected filmography ==
- Take it Jeasy (2008)
- 10 Rules (2014)
- Filthy (2017)
- The Lust For Power (2017)
- Nightsiren (2022)
- Father (2025)
- Our People TV series (in production)

== Accolades ==
Award / Festival	Date of ceremony	Category	Work	Result	Ref.
Stockholm International Film Festival	14 November 2025	Bronze Horse Best Film	Father	Won	
Stockholm International Film Festival	14 November 2025	Best Screenplay	Father	Won	
