= Božena (miniseries) =

- Genre: Drama
- Directed by: Lenka Wimmerová
- Starring: Anna Kameníková, Anna Geislerová
- Country of origin: Czech Republic
- Original language: Czech
- No. of seasons: 1
- No. of episodes: 4

Production
- Running time: 60 minutes

Original release
- Network: Czech Television
- Release: January 3 – January 24, 2021

Božena is a 2021 Czech Biographical miniseries directed by director Lenka Wimmerová. It is a miniseries about Božena Němcová. Czech Television planned to broadcast it in 2020, the year of the bicentenary of the writer's birth, but in the end it was moved to the beginning of 2021. Božena Němcová was portrayed by Anna Kameníková and Anna Geislerová while her husband Josef was portrayed by Jan Hájek.

The first episode premiered on 3 January 2021 on ČT1. The last episode was broadcast for the first time by Czech Television on 24 January 2021.

== Cast and characters ==
- Anna Kameníková as Barbora (Božena) Němcová, younger (episode 1 and 2)
- Anna Geislerová as Božena Němcová (episode 3 and 4)
- Jan Hájek as Josef Němec
- Lukáš Melník as medician Josef Čejka
- Jan Budař as medician Vilém Dušan Lambl
- Eva Josefíková as Antonie Reissová, Božena's friend
- Ondřej Malý as František Ladislav Čelakovský
- Martin Myšička as Václav Staněk
- Klára Suchá as Karolina Staňková
- Kryštof Hádek as Jaroslav Pospíšil, publisher
- Edita Valášková as Manka, Němec family servant
- Veronika Divišová as Dora Němcová, Božena's and Josef's daughter
- Prokop Zach as Karel Němec, Božena's and Josef's son
- Sebastian Vopěnka as Jaroslav Němec, Božena's and Josef's son
- Marek Daniel as Petr Faster
- Jan Nedbal as Václav Bolemír Nebeský
- Viktor Zavadil as tajný
- Vladimír Javorský as Johann Pankel, Božena's father
- Lucie Žáčková as Tereza Panklová, Božena's mother
- Václav Matějovský as Karel Havlíček Borovský
- Martin Finger as páter Václav Štulc
- Vladimír Škultéty as Karel Jaromír Erben
- Elizaveta Maximová as Johana Mužáková, née. Rottová
- Brigita Cmuntová as Žofie Rottová
- Adam Joura as Hanuš Jurenka, Božena's lover
- Jiří Maryško as František Náprstek-Halánek
