= Duch (TV series) =

- Genre: Action crime comedy
- Written by: Peter Nagy, Roman Olekšák, Valéria Schulczová, Tomáš Koňařík, David Laňka, Martin Müller
- Directed by: Róbert Šveda, Peter Bebjak
- Starring: Štěpán Benoni; Predrag Bjelac
- Country of origin: Czech Republic
- Original language: Czech
- No. of seasons: 2
- No. of episodes: 16

Production
- Running time: 60 minutes

Original release
- Network: Prima televize
- Release: February 5, 2022

Duch (Ghost) is a 2022 Czech action crime comedy television series by Prima televize. It is inspired by Randall and Hopkirk (Deceased). In August 2023 the series was renewed for season 2 that will start broadcast on 24 August 2024.

== Plot ==
The series tells the story of the inconspicuous criminalist Emil who works at the headquarters the Central Office against organized crime. He is more of an analytical type of criminologist and isn't used to work in a field. The Central Office has been dealing with Darko Besarabič's crime group for a long time. Despite the fact that Emil does not excel in physical actions and his shooting tests are at the lower limit while his physical condition is similar, he is forced into action and gets injured in a shootout. He wakes up in a hospital and discovers that he has the ghost of Darko Besarabič by his side. Darko agrees to help Emil in his work if Emil helps him to find his killer.

== Cast ==
=== Main ===
- Štěpán Benoni as Emil Svoboda
- Predrag Bjelac as Darko Besarabič
- Marta Dancingerová as Radka (season 1)
- Leona Skleničková as Capt. Hanka Havránková
- Pavel Batěk as Václav
- Petr Batěk as Josef
- Pavel Nečas as Chief Libor
- Ha Thanh Špetlíková as Yjen
