= Czech Film Critics' Awards =

Czech Film Critics' Awards Ceny české filmové kritiky
- Awarded for: Excellence in cinematic achievements
- Country: Czech Republic
- Presented by: Association of Czech Film Critics
- First award: 13 January 2011 (to honor achievements of 2010)
- Website: filmovakritika.cz

Czech Film Critics' Awards (Czech: Ceny české filmové kritiky) are annual awards that recognize accomplishments in filmmaking and television. Awards were established in 2010 as alternative to Czech Lion Awards. Awards are organised by Association of Czech Film Critics.

== Categories ==
- Best film
- Best documentary
- Best director
- Best screenplay
- Best actress
- Best actor
- Best audiovisual work
- Best television title
- innogy Award for Newcomer of the Year

== Best film winners ==
Year	English Name	Original Name	Director
2010	Walking Too Fast	Pouta	Radim Špaček
2011	Long Live the Family!	Rodina je základ státu	Robert Sedláček
2012	In the Shadow	Ve stínu	David Ondříček
2013	Burning Bush	Hořící keř	Agnieszka Holland
2014	The Way Out	Cesta ven	Petr Václav
2015	Lost in Munich	Ztraceni v Mnichově	Petr Zelenka
2016	Family Film	Rodinný film	Olmo Omerzu
2017	Filthy	Špína	Tereza Nvotová
2018	Jan Palach	Jan Palach	Robert Sedláček
2019	Old-Timers	Staříci	Martin Dušek, Ondřej Provazník
2020	Shadow Country	Krajina ve stínu	Bohdan Sláma
2021	Occupation	Okupace	Michal Nohejl
2022	Arved	Arvéd	Vojtěch Mašek
2023	She Came at Night	Přišla v noci	Jan Vejnar and Tomáš Pavlíček
2024	Girl America	Amerikánka	Viktor Tauš
2025	Broken Voices	Sbormistr	Ondřej Provazník
