= Martin Pechlát =

Czech actor

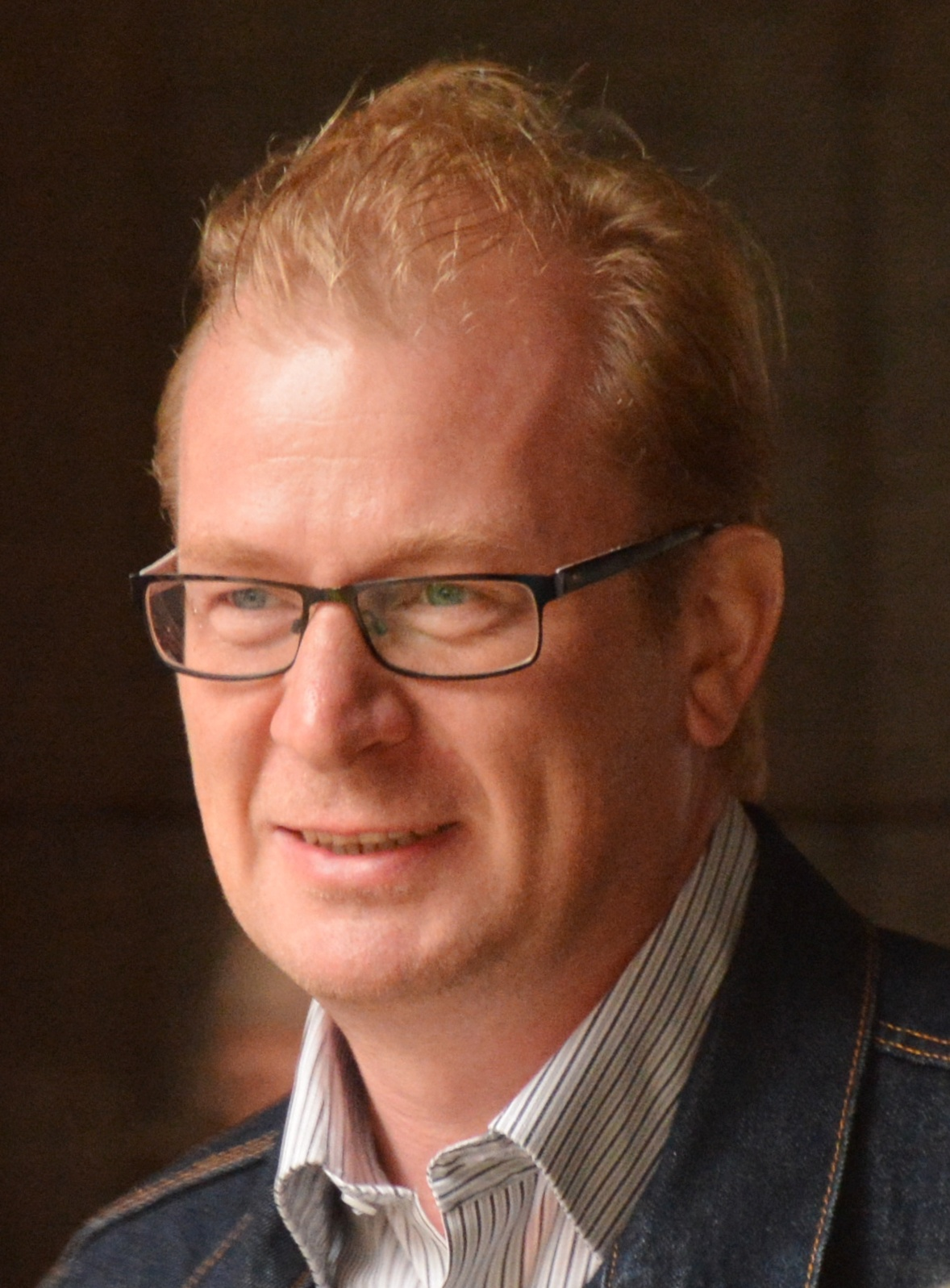
- Martin Pechlát (2017)
- Born: 30 October 1974 (age 50); Prague, Czechoslovakia
- Occupation: Actor
- Years active: 2005–present

Martin Pechlát (born 30 October 1974) is a Czech actor.

== Selected filmography ==
=== Film ===
- Boredom in Brno (2003)
- Účastníci zájezdu (2006)
- Václav (2007)
- František je děvkař (2008)
- Family Film (2015)
- Winter Flies (2018)
- Rédl (2018)
- The Last Aristocrat (2019)
- Occupation (2021)
- Bet on Friendship (2021)
- Bird Atlas (2021)
- Arvéd (2022)
- Hadí plyn (2023)

=== Television ===
- Stockholm Syndrome (2020)
- Pan profesor (2021)
- Táta v nesnázích (2022)
- Volha (2023)
