= Mistakes (film) =

- Directed by: Jan Prušinovský
- Written by: Roman Vojkůvka
- Starring: Pavla Gajdošíková; Jan Jankovský
- Release date: 15 July 2021; (Czech Republic)
- Running time: 99 minutes
- Country: Czech Republic
- Language: Czech
- Box office: 1,166,749 CZK

Mistakes (Czech: Chyby) is a 2021 Czech romantic drama film directed by Jan Prušinovský. It tells the story of lovers Ema and Tomáš whose relationship gets affected by Ema's past. It received Czech Lion Award for Best Actress in Leading Role.

== Cast ==
- Pavla Gajdošíková as Ema
- Jan Jankovský as Tomáš
- Ondřej Kokorský as Igor
- Ivo Gogál as Dušan
- Jan Kolařík as Kloc
- Eva Hacurová as Věra
- Marta Dancingerová as Jarka
- Slávek Bílský as Karel
- Monika Načeva as Zdena, Tomáš' mother
- Karolína Frydecká as Renata, Ema's mother
- Kryštof Rímský as Alfa
- Michaela Petřeková as Ilona
- Vít Roleček as Marek
- Martin Dusbaba as Leo
