= Old-Timers =

- Directed by: Martin Dušek, Ondřej Provazník
- Screenplay by: Martin Dušek, Ondřej Provazník
- Starring: Jiří Schmitzer, Ladislav Mrkvička
- Cinematography: Lukáš Milota
- Music by: Matouš Hejl, Miroslav Srnka
- Production company: Česká televize
- Release date: 17 October 2019
- Running time: 85 minutes
- Country: Czech Republic
- Language: Czech
- Budget: 30 Million CZK

Old-Timers (Czech title Staříci) is a 2019 Czech thriller starring Jiří Schmitzer and Ladislav Mrkvička. It was directed by Martin Dušek and Ondřej Provazník.

== Plot ==
Vlastimil Reiner returns to the Czech Republic from Oregon. He meets with his old friend Antonín and together they plan to murder an elderly former Communist prosecutor who evaded punishment for his crimes under the Communist regime.

== Cast ==
- Jiří Schmitzer as Vlastimil Reiner
- Ladislav Mrkvička as Antonín
- Dušan Kaprálik
- Michal Suchánek
- Přemysl Bureš
- Karel Jirák
- Marika Procházková
- Pavel Batěk

== Reception ==
The film received generally positive reviews. It holds 68% on Kinobox as of March 2020.

Jiří Schmitzer and Ladislav Mrkvička have won the Main Trilobit Award for their performance in Old-Timers. Old-Timers was also nominated for 5 Czech Film Critics' Awards and 10 Czech Lion Awards.

Year	Event	Award	Category	Recipient(s)	Result	Ref(s)
2020
2020	Trilobit Awards 2020	Trilobit Award	Main award	Jiří Schmitzer and Ladislav Mrkvička	Won	
2020	9th Czech Film Critics' Awards	Czech Film Critics' Award	Best Film	Old-Timers	Won	
2020	9th Czech Film Critics' Awards	Czech Film Critics' Award	Best Director	Martin Dušek and Ondřej Provazník	Won	
2020	9th Czech Film Critics' Awards	Czech Film Critics' Award	Best Screenplay	Martin Dušek and Ondřej Provazník	Nominated	
2020	9th Czech Film Critics' Awards	Czech Film Critics' Award	Best actor	Jiří Schmitzer	Won	
2020	9th Czech Film Critics' Awards	Czech Film Critics' Award	Best actor	Ladislav Mrkvička	Nominated	
2020	27th Czech Lion Awards	Czech Lion Award	Best film	Old-Timers	Nominated	
2020	27th Czech Lion Awards	Czech Lion Award	Best Director	Martin Dušek and Ondřej Provazník	Nominated	
2020	27th Czech Lion Awards	Czech Lion Award	Best Actor in a Leading Role	Jiří Schmitzer	Won	
2020	27th Czech Lion Awards	Czech Lion Award	Best Actor in a Supporting Role	Ladislav Mrkvička	Won	
2020	27th Czech Lion Awards	Czech Lion Award	Best Screenplay	Martin Dušek, Ondřej Provazník	Nominated	
2020	27th Czech Lion Awards	Czech Lion Award	Best Cinematography	Lukáš Milota	Nominated	
2020	27th Czech Lion Awards	Czech Lion Award	Best Editing	Jana Vlčková	Nominated	
2020	27th Czech Lion Awards	Czech Lion Award	Best Sound	Václav Flegl	Nominated	
2020	27th Czech Lion Awards	Czech Lion Award	Best Music	Matouš Hejl, Miroslav Srnka	Nominated	
2020	27th Czech Lion Awards	Czech Lion Award	Makeup and Hairstyling	Eva Schwarzová	Nominated	
2020	33rd Finále Plzeň Film Festival	Golden Kingfisher	Best feature live action or animated film	Old-Timers	TBA	
