= Home Care (film) =

2015 film

- Film poster
- Directed by: Slávek Horák
- Written by: Slávek Horák
- Produced by: Slávek Horák; Tomas Rotnagi
- Starring: Alena Mihulová
- Cinematography: Jan Šťastný
- Edited by: Vladimír Barák
- Production company: TVORBA films
- Distributed by: A-Company Czech s.r.o.
- Release date: 5 July 2015
- Running time: 92 minutes
- Countries: Czech Republic; Slovakia
- Language: Czech

Home Care (Czech: Domácí péče) is a 2015 Czech-Slovak drama film directed by Slávek Horák. The film was selected as the Czech entry for the Best Foreign Language Film at the 88th Academy Awards but it was not nominated.

== Plot ==
Vlasta is a home nurse who selflessly lives in the countryside in South Moravia for her patients; her husband; and her daughter, Lada. One day, their lives drastically changed when Vlasta becomes sick, and help from outside is needed. Through the daughter of one of her patients, she tries alternative medicine, much to the dismay of her husband, who has little confidence in it.

== Cast ==
- Alena Mihulová as Vlasta
- Bolek Polívka as Láďa
- Tatiana Vilhelmová as Hanácková
- Zuzana Krónerová as Miriam
- Sara Venclovská as Marcela
- Eva Matalová as Zelíková
- Marián Mitaš as Young doctor

== Awards and accolades ==
The film received the Cercle D'or award for Best Movie in the International competition at the Festival Cinéma du monde de Sherbrooke. The jury also gave Mihulová a special prize for Outstanding Performance.

Mihulová received the Czech Lion award for Best Actress in a Starring Role. The film had eight other nominations for the Czech Lions (the country's top film and television awards).

At the Karlovy Vary International Film Festival, Mihulová was conferred the award for best actress.

She also won the Fipresci Prize for Best Actress of the Year in a Foreign Language Film at the Palm Springs International Film Festival.

== See also ==
- List of submissions to the 88th Academy Awards for Best Foreign Language Film
- List of Czech submissions for the Academy Award for Best Foreign Language Film
