= Diana Cam Van Nguyen =

Czech-Vietnamese animated filmmaker

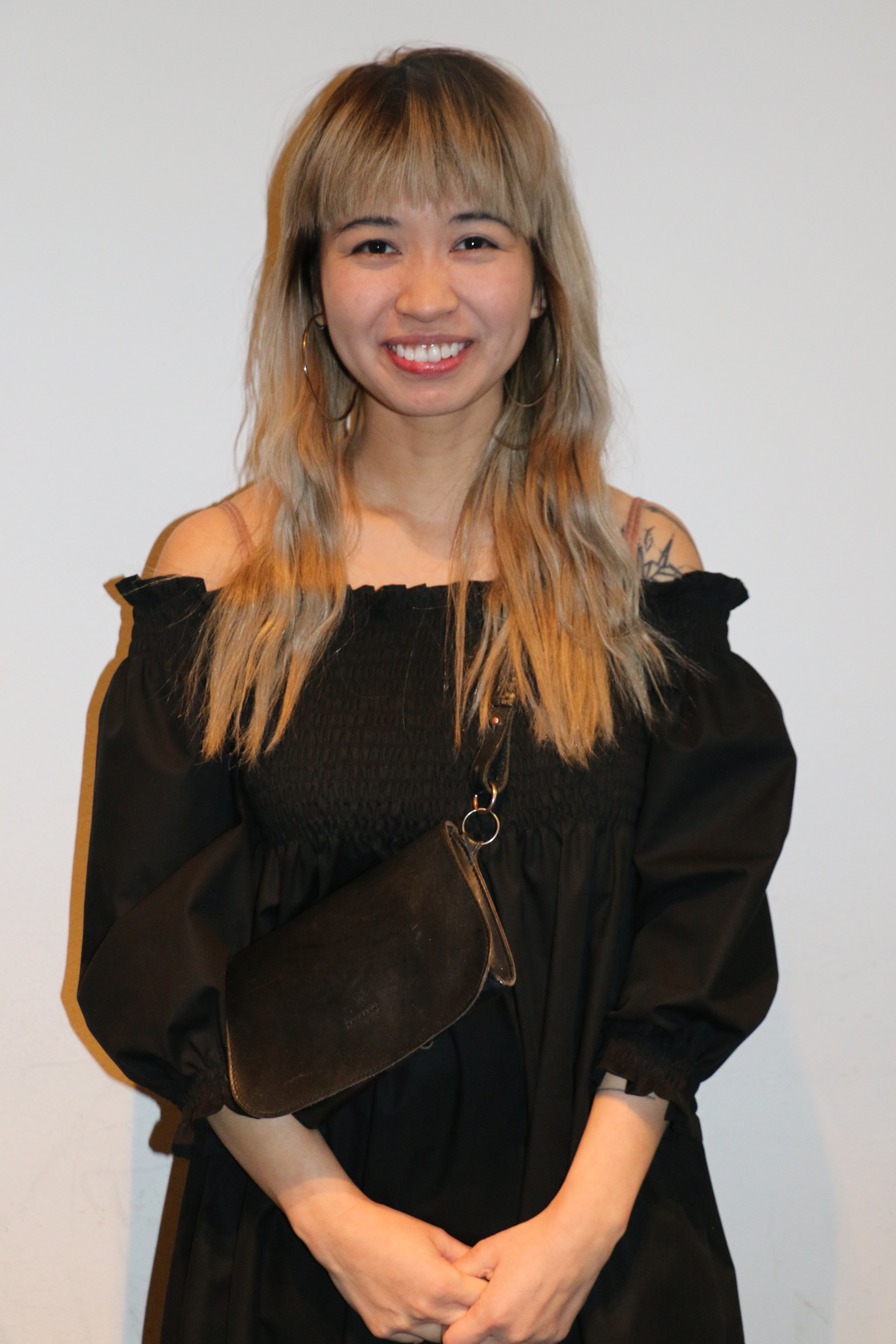
- Born: 30 November 1993 (age 32); Cheb, Czech Republic
- Education: FAMU
- Occupations: Animation director, Animator
- Years active: 2010s–present

Diana Cam Van Nguyen (born 30 November 1993) is a Czech-Vietnamese animated filmmaker, most noted for her 2021 short documentary film Love, Dad (Milý tati). The film, made as her graduation project from the Film and TV School of the Academy of Performing Arts in Prague, won numerous awards on the film festival circuit between 2021 and 2023.

Prior to Love, Dad, she made the short films The Little One (2017) and Apart (2018).

In 2022 she won the TorinoFilmLab Award at the Talents and Short Film Market for Inbetween Worlds, a feature film project based in part on Love, Dad.
