= Pavla Gajdošíková =

Czech actress (born 1973)

- Born: 4 July 1991 (age 33); Otrokovice, Czechoslovakia
- Occupation: Actress
- Years active: 2012–present

Pavla Gajdošíková (born 4 July 1991) is a Czech actress. She won the Czech Lion Award for Best Actress in Leading Role for her performance as Ema in Mistakes.
