= Occupation (2021 film) =

- Directed by: Michal Nohejl
- Written by: Michal Nohejl; Marek Šindelka; Vojtěch Mašek
- Starring: Martin Pechlát
- Music by: La Petite Sonja; Hank J. Manchini
- Distributed by: Bontonfilm
- Release date: 5 August 2021; (Czech Republic)
- Running time: 98 minutes
- Country: Czech Republic
- Language: Czech

Occupation (Czech: Okupace) is a 2021 Czech comedy drama film directed by Michal Nohejl. In addition to Nohejl, Marek Šindelka and Vojtěch Mašek also participated in the script. The film was based on a story from the period of normalization, when a Russian soldier walks into the theater after the performance among the celebrating actors and the actors have to decide how to deal with the hated occupier.

Martin Pechlát, Cyril Dobrý, Antonie Formanová, Otakar Brousek, Tomáš Jeřábek, Pavel Neškudla, Alexej Gorbunov and Vlastimil Venclík appeared in the main roles. The band Kill the Dandies!, who also appeared in the film, contributed to the film's soundtrack.

The film was co-produced by Czech Television, with the support of the State Cinematography Fund. The film premiered in Czech cinemas on 5 August 2021. The film went through cinemas without much attention from the audience, but was praised by critics. It won four Czech Film Critics' Awards and three Czech Lion Awards (script, music and Formanová for Best Supporting Actress).

The international premiere took place in November 2021 in Tallinn at the Black Nights Film Festival. Here, the film was selected for the First Features competition section, intended for debut films.

== Cast ==
- Martin Pechlát as Jindřich
- Otakar Brousek as director
- Cyril Dobrý as Vladimír
- Antonie Formanová as Milada
- Pavel Neškudla as Petr
- Tomáš Jeřábek as Antonín
- Alexej Gorbunov as Russian
- Vlastimil Venclík as Josef
- Lucie Roznětínská as bartender
- Anton Tatatu as Russian soldier
- Alisher Fakhrijev as Russian soldier
