= Alena Mihulová =

Czech actress

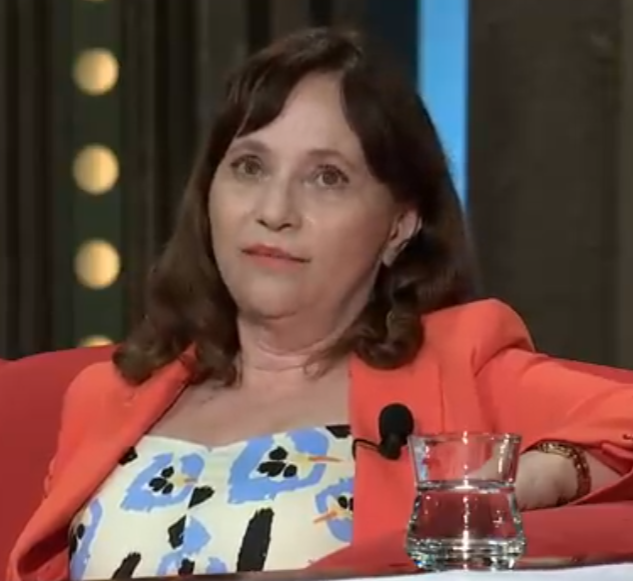
- On Show Jana Krause in 2023
- Born: 4 May 1965 (age 60); Brno, Czechoslovakia
- Occupation: Actress
- Years active: 1983-present
- Partner: Karel Kachyňa

Alena Mihulová (born 4 May 1965) is a Czech film and television actress. She won a Czech Lion for her role in Home Care. She was married to film director Karel Kachyňa.

== Selected filmography ==
- Sestřičky (1983)
- Smrt krásných srnců (1986)
- Kráva (1992)
- Wild Flowers (2000)
- Lidice (2011)
- Innocence (2011)
- Home Care (2015)
- Anthropoid (2016)
- The Zookeeper's Wife (2017)
- Milada (2017)
