= 2024 Czech Lion Awards =

Czech film and TV award ceremony

32nd Czech Lion Awards
- Date: 8 March 2025
- Hosted by: Karel Kovář
- Directed by: Michael Čech

Highlights
- Best Picture: Waves
- Best Actor: Oldřich Kaiser; The Gardener's Year
- Best Actress: Pavla Beretová; Year of the Widow
- Best Supporting Actor: Stanislav Majer; Waves
- Best Supporting Actress: Tatiana Pauhofová; Waves
- Most awards: Waves (6)
- Most nominations: Waves (14)

Television coverage
- Network: Czech Television
- Ratings: 647,000

The 2024 Czech Lion Awards ceremony was held on 8 March 2025. It was hosted by Karel Kovář (known as Kovy) at the Rudolfinum building in Prague.

== Categories ==
Nominations were announced on 13 January 2025. 93 works were allowed to be part of competition. Categories underwent some changes as categories Best Television Film or Miniseries and Best TV Series were united into a single category - Best Television Miniseries or Series. Also categories for actors in TV series were added. Recipients of the Czech Lion Award for Unique Contribution to Czech Film were announced on 22 January 2025.

Waves received highest number of nominations followed by Girl America. Television series Metoda Markovič: Hojer received 10 nominations.

Best Film	Best Director
Waves; The Gardener's Year; Girl America; March to May; Our Lovely Pig Slaughter	Waves – Jiří Mádl; Girl America – Viktor Tauš; Our Lovely Pig Slaughter – Adam Martinec; March to May – Martin Pavol Repka; The Gardener's Year – Jiří Havelka
Best Actor in a Leading Role	Best Actress in a Leading Role
The Gardener's Year – Oldřich Kaiser; Mr. and Mrs. Stodola – Jan Hájek; Our Lovely Pig Slaughter – Karel Martinec; Smetana – Václav Neužil; Waves – Vojtěch Vodochodský	Year of the Widow – Pavla Beretová; Girl America – Klára Kitto; Mr. and Mrs. Stodola – Lucie Žáčková; Dry Season – Magdaléna Borová; Her Drunken Diary – Tereza Ramba
Best Actor in a Supporting Role	Best Actress in a Supporting Role
Waves – Stanislav Majer; After Party – Jan Zadražil; The Hungarian Dressmaker – Milan Ondrík; Our Lovely Pig Slaughter – Antonín Budínský; Waves – Martin Hofmann	Waves – Tatiana Pauhofová; Girl America – Klára Melíšková; Girl America – Lucie Žáčková; Our Lovely Pig Slaughter – Karin Bílíková; Smetana – Denisa Barešová
Best Screenplay	Best Cinematography
Waves – Jiří Mádl; Girl America – David Jařab; Metoda Markovič: Hojer – Jaroslav Hruška; Our Lovely Pig Slaughter – Adam Martinec; The Gardener's Year – Jiří Havelka	Girl America – Martin Douba; Metoda Markovič: Hojer – Ondřej Belica; Our Lovely Pig Slaughter – David Hofmann; Year of the Widow – Dušan Husár; Waves – Martin Žiaran
Music	Best Editing
Living Large – Michal Novinski; Girl America – Jan Michael Prokeš; I'm Not Everything I Want to Be – Oliver Torr, Prokop Korb, Adam Matej; Our Lovely Pig Slaughter – Jonatan Pjoni Pastirčák; Waves – Simon Goff	I'm Not Everything I Want to Be – Alexander Kashcheev; Girl America – Alois Fišárek, Krzysztof Komander; Metoda Markovič: Hojer – Tomáš Holocsy; Our Lovely Pig Slaughter – Matěj Sláma; Waves – Filip Malásek
Sound	Stage Design
Waves – Viktor Ekrt; Girl America – Michał Fojcik, Michał Bagiński; I'm Not Everything I Want to Be – Alexander Kashcheev, Michaela Patríková; Our Lovely Pig Slaughter – Miki Kocáb, Peter Hilčanský; Living Large – David Titěra, Viktor Ekrt	Girl America – Jan Kadlec; Dcera národa – Henrich Boráros; Metoda Markovič: Hojer – Milan Býček; Smetana – Jan Vlasák; Waves – Petr Kunc
Makeup and Hairstyling	Costume Design
Smetana – Martin Valeš, Jana Bílková, Martin Větrovec; Girl America – Jana Dopitová, René Stejskal; Dcera národa – Lenka Nosková; Metoda Markovič: Hojer – Lukáš Král; Waves – Adéla Anděla Bursová	Girl America – Jan Kadlec; Dcera národa – Jarmila Dunděrová; Metoda Markovič: Hojer – Vladimíra Pachl Fomínová; Smetana – Andrea Králová; Waves – Katarína Štrbová Bieliková
Best Animated Film	Best Short Film
Living Large; Hurikán; Big Man	Buzz of the Earth; Butterfly Girl; The Sea in Between
Best Television Miniseries or Series	Best Documentary
Metoda Markovič: Hojer; Dcera národa; Dobré ráno, Brno! II; Smysl pro tumor; Vlastně se nic nestalo	I'm Not Everything I Want to Be; Czechoslovak Architecture 58-89; Limits of Europe; Ms. President; War Correspondent
Best Leading Actor in TV Series	Best Leading Actress in TV Series
Metoda Markovič: Hojer – Petr Lněnička; Dobré ráno, Brno! II – Jan Kolařík; Smysl pro tumor – Filip Březina	Dobré ráno, Brno! II – Zuzana Zlatohlávková; Dcera národa – Antonie Formanová; Smysl pro tumor – Alžběta Malá
Best Supporting Actor in TV Series	Best Supporting Actress in TV Series
Metoda Markovič: Hojer – Petr Uhlík; Smysl pro tumor – Jiří Bartoška; Smysl pro tumor – Pavel Řezníček	Dobré ráno, Brno! II – Simona Lewandowska; Metoda Markovič: Hojer – Sarah Haváčová; Náhradníci – Iva Janžurová
Unique Contribution to Czech Film	Extraordinary audiovisual achievement
Mario Klemens; Karel Smyczek	

=== Non-statutory Awards ===
Best Film Poster	Film Fans Award
Girl America	Waves
Magnesie Award for Best Student Film
Weeds; 3MWh; Butterfly Girl; Buzz of the Earth; Humanity

=== Films and series with multiple nominations and awards ===
Titles with multiple nominations
Nominations	Film or Series
14	Waves
13	Girl America
10	Metoda Markovič: Hojer
5	Dcera národa
5	Smysl pro tumor
5	Smetana
4	Dobré ráno, Brno! II
4	The Gardener's Year
4	I'm Not Everything I Want to Be
3	Living Large

Titles with multiple wins
Awards	Film or Series
6	Waves
3	Metoda Markovič: Hojer
3	Girl America
2	Living Large
2	Dobré ráno, Brno! II
2	I'm Not Everything I Want to Be
