= List of Czech submissions for the Academy Award for Best International Feature Film =

Best International Feature Film submissions from the Czech Republic

Highlights
- Debut: 1994
- Submissions: 33
- Nominations: 3
- Oscar winners: 1

The Czech Republic has submitted films for the Academy Award for Best International Feature Film (Note: The category was previously named the Academy Award for Best Foreign Language Film, but this was changed to the Academy Award for Best International Feature Film in April 2019, after the Academy deemed the word "Foreign" to be outdated.) since 1994. The award is handed out annually by the United States Academy of Motion Picture Arts and Sciences to a feature-length motion picture produced outside the United States that contains primarily non-English dialogue. It was not created until the 1956 Academy Awards, in which a competitive Academy Award of Merit, known as the Best Foreign Language Film Award, was created for non-English speaking films, and has been given annually since.

Prior to becoming a separate state in 1993, the Czech Republic was part of Czechoslovakia, which submitted twenty-three films for Oscar consideration between 1964 and 1991. Since 1994, the country has been submitting films regularly for the category.

As of 2026, Czech Republic has been nominated three times, winning once for Kolya (1996).

== Submissions ==
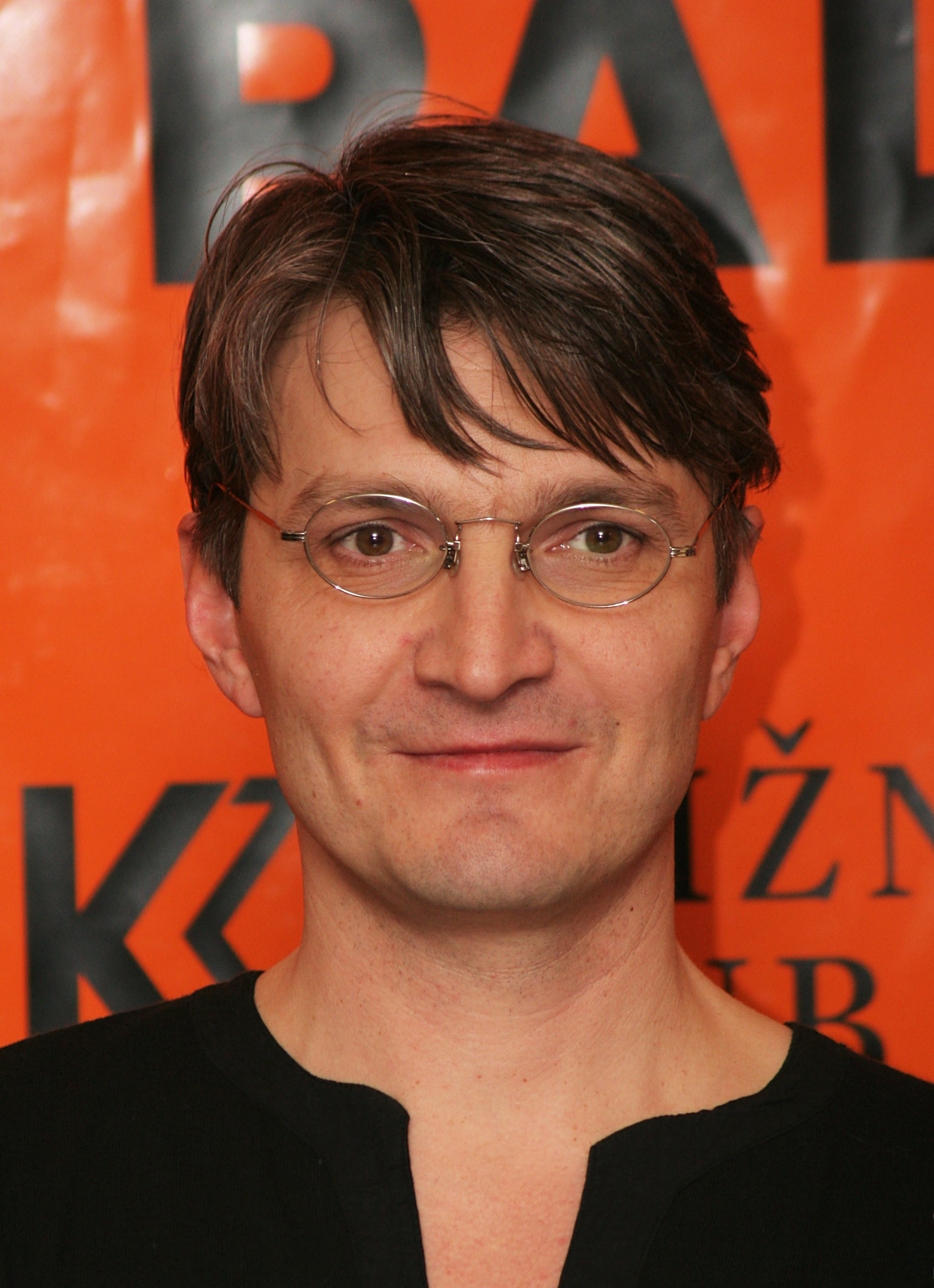
Jan Svěrák won Czech Republic first and only Academy Award for Best Foreign Language Film, for his film Kolya (1996).

The Academy of Motion Picture Arts and Sciences has invited the film industries of various countries to submit their best film for the Academy Award for Best International Feature Film since 1956. The International Feature Film Committee oversees the process and reviews all the submitted films. Following this, they vote via secret ballot to determine the five nominees for the award.

Before the split of Czechoslovakia in 1993, all films chosen by the former had a significant input from actors, directors and crew from the Czech Republic. The country had won the category twice, for Closely Watched Trains (1967) and The Shop on Main Street (1965).

Since 1994, Czech Republic has been nominated three times, winning for Jan Svěrák's Kolya at the 69th Academy Awards. The two other nominated films were: Jan Hřebejk's Divided We Fall nominated at the 73rd Academy Awards, and Ondřej Trojan's Želary nominated at the 76th Academy Awards.

Václav Marhoul's The Painted Bird (2019), Agnieszka Holland's Charlatan (2020), and Jiří Mádl's Waves (2024), advanced to the December shortlisted semifinalists, but were not nominated.

Most of the films are primarily in Czech language, with the exception of Il Boemo (2022), which is mainly in Italian. Below is a list of the films that have been submitted by the Czech Republic for review by the academy for the award by the year of the submission and the respective Academy Award ceremony.

Year (Ceremony)	Film title used in nomination	Original title	Director	Result
1994 (67th)	Faust	Lekce Faust	Jan Švankmajer	Not nominated
1995 (68th)	Thanks for Every New Morning	Díky za každé nové ráno	Milan Šteindler	Not nominated
1996 (69th)	Kolya	Kolja	Jan Svěrák	Won Academy Award
1997 (70th)	Forgotten Light	Zapomenuté světlo	Vladimír Michálek	Not nominated
1998 (71st)	Sekal Has to Die	Je třeba zabít Sekala	Vladimír Michálek	Not nominated
1999 (72nd)	The Idiot Returns	Návrat idiota	Saša Gedeon	Not nominated
2000 (73rd)	Divided We Fall	Musíme si pomáhat	Jan Hřebejk	Nominated
2001 (74th)	Dark Blue World	Tmavomodrý svět	Jan Svěrák	Not nominated
2002 (75th)	Wild Bees	Divoké včely	Bohdan Sláma	Not nominated
2003 (76th)	Želary		Ondřej Trojan	Nominated
2004 (77th)	Up and Down	Horem pádem	Jan Hřebejk	Not nominated
2005 (78th)	Something Like Happiness	Štěstí	Bohdan Sláma	Not nominated
2006 (79th)	Lunacy	Šílení	Jan Švankmajer	Not nominated
2007 (80th)	I Served the King of England	Obsluhoval jsem anglického krále	Jiří Menzel	Not nominated
2008 (81st)	The Karamazovs	Karamazovi	Petr Zelenka	Not nominated
2009 (82nd)	Protector	Protektor	Marek Najbrt	Not nominated
2010 (83rd)	Kawasaki's Rose	Kawasakiho růže	Jan Hřebejk	Not nominated
2011 (84th)	Alois Nebel	Alois Nebel	Tomáš Luňák	Not nominated
2012 (85th)	In the Shadow	Ve stínu	David Ondříček	Not nominated
2013 (86th)	The Don Juans	Donšajni	Jiří Menzel	Not nominated
2014 (87th)	Fair Play		Andrea Sedláčková	Not nominated
2015 (88th)	Home Care	Domácí péče	Slávek Horák	Not nominated
2016 (89th)	Lost in Munich	Ztraceni v Mnichově	Petr Zelenka	Not nominated
2017 (90th)	Ice Mother	Bába z ledu	Bohdan Sláma	Not nominated
2018 (91st)	Winter Flies	Všechno bude	Olmo Omerzu	Not nominated
2019 (92nd)	The Painted Bird	Nabarvené ptáče	Václav Marhoul	Made shortlist
2020 (93rd)	Charlatan	Šarlatán	Agnieszka Holland	Made shortlist
2021 (94th)	Zátopek		David Ondříček	Not nominated
2022 (95th)	Il Boemo		Petr Václav	Not nominated
2023 (96th)	Brothers	Bratři	Tomáš Mašín	Not nominated
2024 (97th)	Waves	Vlny	Jiří Mádl	Made shortlist
2025 (98th)	I'm Not Everything I Want to Be	Ještě nejsem, kým chci být	Klára Tasovská	Not nominated
2026 (99th)	If Pigeons Turned to Gold	Kdyby se holubi promenili ve zlato	Pepa Lubojacki	Pending

== Shortlisted films ==
Since 2021, the country has created a preliminary shortlist, usually announced few weeks before the final submission. The following films have been shortlisted:

Year	Films
2021	Bird Atlas · Even Mice Belong in Heaven
2022	Arvéd · Bethlehem Night · Borders of Love · Buko · The Head of the Tribe · Jan Koller - The Story Of Ordinary Boy · The Last Race · Nightsiren · Ordinary Failures · Princ Mamánek · Shadowplay · Somewhere Over the Chemtrails · Victim
2023	All About the Little Things · The Ballad of Piargy · The Exhale · Happily Ever After · The Man Who Stood in the Way · Nagano Kids · Restore Point · A Sensitive Person · Snake Gas · Two Words as the Key · We Have Never Been Modern
2024	Dry Season · The End of the World · Escape to Berlin · The Gardener's Year · Girl America · Hello, Welcome · Her Body · Her Drunken Diary · The Meaning and Mystery of Life · Our Lovely Pig Slaughter · Tony, Shelly and the Magic Light · Waltzing Matilda
2025	Broken Voices · Caravan
2026	Chica Checa · Five Plums · Invincibles · Little Thief

== See also ==
- List of Czechoslovak submissions for the Academy Award for Best International Feature Film
- List of Academy Award winners and nominees for Best International Feature Film
- List of Academy Award-winning foreign language films
- Cinema of the Czech Republic
