= Waves (2024 film) =

- Theatrical release poster
- Directed by: Jiří Mádl
- Written by: Jiří Mádl
- Produced by: Monika Kristlová
- Starring: Vojtěch Vodochodský; Vojtěch Kotek; Táňa Pauhofová; Stanislav Majer; Martin Hofmann
- Cinematography: Martin Žiaran
- Edited by: Filip Malásek
- Music by: Simon Goff
- Production company: Dawson Films
- Distributed by: Bontonfilm
- Release dates: 1 July 2024 (Karlovy Vary); 15 August 2024 (Czech Republic)
- Running time: 131 minutes (theatrical)
- Countries: Czech Republic; Slovakia
- Languages: Czech; Slovak; Russian
- Budget: 79,800,000 CZK
- Box office: 158,788,814 CZK

Waves (Czech: Vlny) is a 2024 historical thriller drama film written and directed by Jiří Mádl and set during the Prague Spring and subsequent Warsaw Pact invasion of Czechoslovakia. The film had its world premiere at the 58th Karlovy Vary International Film Festival where it won the audience award. It was selected as the Czech entry for the Best International Feature Film at the 97th Academy Awards.

Waves entered theatres on 15 August 2024 and became the highest-grossing Czech film of 2024 and the 2nd highest-grossing Czech film of all time.

== Plot ==
The story revolves around the Editorial Office of International Life of the Czechoslovak Radio. It works under the leadership of Milan Weiner, a journalistic icon. Other journalists include Věra Šťovíčková-Heroldová, Jiří Dienstbier, Luboš Dobrovský, and Jan Petránek. Young Tomáš gets among them a bit by mistake as the work in the editorial office was the dream of his younger brother Pavel and Tomáš's main concern is to protect his brother. Little does he know that the local editors are watched by State Security (StB). Tomáš is forced to sign cooperation with StB if he wants to protect his brother who along with his classmates participates in illegal activity. Tomáš gets closer to journalists in the office especially with Věra which leaves him conflicted between concern for his brother's safety and his own conscience. When Warsaw Pact invades Czechoslovakia, he refuses to collaborate with occupiers and helps journalists to broadcast uncensored information about the invasion of Warsaw Pact troops and call for passive resistance to the occupiers. He risks his own life to sustain broadcast as long as possible.

== Cast ==
- Vojtěch Vodochodský as Tomáš Havlík
- Ondřej Stupka as Pavel Havlík
- Táňa Pauhofová as Věra Šťovíčková-Heroldová
- Stanislav Majer as Milan Weiner
- Vojtěch Kotek as Jiří Dienstbier
- Marika Šoposká as Secretary Jarunka
- Petr Lněnička as Jan Petránek
- Martin Hofmann as Luboš Dobrovský
- Petr Halíček as technician Jaroslav Pavelka
- Matyáš Řezníček as Karel Jezdinský
- Jacob Erftemeijer as Ludvík Čermák
- Jan Nedbal as Zdeněk Šimr
- Tomáš Maštalír as Karel Hoffmann
- Igor Bareš as Hrabský, Director of Radio
- Michaela Majerníková as Jezdinská
- Jevgenij Libezňuk as General
- Jan Novotný as Antonín Novotný
- Tomáš Weber as Holenda
- Marie Anna Kupcová as Simona
- Daniel Tůma as Karásek
- Hana Kusnjerová as Marie Weinerová
- Theo Jacques as Waldemar Matuška

== Production ==
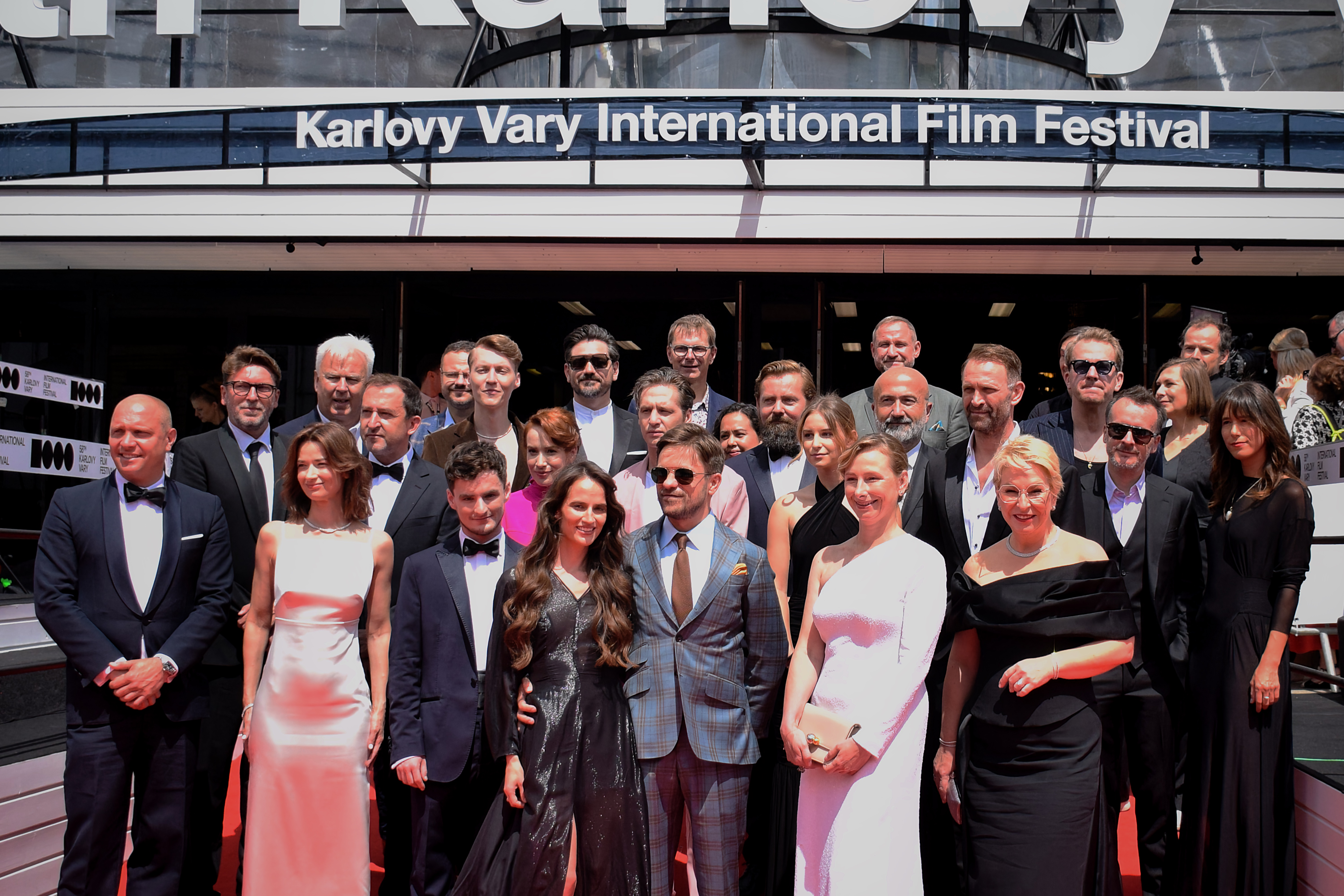
Delegation to the film Waves at the red carpet at the 58th Karlovy Vary International Film Festival

The film was directed by Jiří Mádl, who also wrote screenplay. Film's budget was approximately 80 million CZK. Mádl used historical film material for Waves and combined it with scenes shot for the film. He was inspired for this approach by Peter Jackson's post-edited documentary film They Shall Not Grow Old. The director has been fascinated by radio since his childhood. Waves is a tribute to the work of editors at Czechoslovak Radio. Mádl based the film on the memories of contemporary witnesses, including the journalist Jan Petránek and especially Věra Štovíčková, from whom he learned things that cannot be found in textbooks. At the end of the 1960s, both worked in the “International Life” editorial team, for which Karel Jezdínský, Dobrovský and Dienstbier also worked at the time.

The film music was composed by Simon Goff. The Grammy Award winner has worked with Icelandic Hildur Guðnadóttir in the past and has previously worked on films such as Joker and We Have Never Been Modern and television series such as Chernobyl.

The first trailer for Vlny was presented at the end of June 2024. The film premiered on July 1, 2024 at the Karlovy Vary International Film Festival. The cinema release in the Czech Republic was planned for August 15, 2024. The film premiered on 1 August 2024 in Slovakia. The film premiered in Prague on 6 August 2024 and entered theatrical distribution on 15 August in the Czech Republic.

== Reception ==
The film was released to positive reviews from critics according to Kinobox aggregator.

The film premiered at Karlovy Vary International Film Festival where it received standing ovation from audiences that lasted for 10 minutes and won audience polling with average rating 1.05. The film also received standing ovation upon its premiere in Bratislava.

The film won 2024 Satellite Award for Best Foreign Language Film.

=== Accolades ===
Awards and nominations received by Waves
Year	Event	Award	Category	Recipient(s)	Result	Ref(s)
2024	58th Karlovy Vary International Film Festival	Právo Award	Audience Award	Waves	Won	
2024	Finále Plzeň Film Festival	Student Jury Award	Best feature film	Waves	Won	
2025	29th Satellite Awards	Satellite Awards	Best Foreign Language Film	Waves	Won	
2025	15th Czech Film Critics' Awards	Czech Film Critics' Award	Best Film	Waves	Nominated	
2025	15th Czech Film Critics' Awards	Czech Film Critics' Award	Best Director	Jiří Mádl	Nominated	
2025	15th Czech Film Critics' Awards	Czech Film Critics' Award	Best screenplay	Jiří Mádl	Nominated	
2025	32nd Czech Lion Awards	Czech Lion Award	Best Film	Waves	Won	
2025	32nd Czech Lion Awards	Czech Lion Award	Best Director	Jiří Mádl	Won	
2025	32nd Czech Lion Awards	Czech Lion Award	Best Actor in Leading Role	Vojtěch Vodochodský	Nominated	
2025	32nd Czech Lion Awards	Czech Lion Award	Best Supporting Actor	Stanislav Majer	Won	
2025	32nd Czech Lion Awards	Czech Lion Award	Best Supporting Actor	Martin Hoffmann	Nominated	
2025	32nd Czech Lion Awards	Czech Lion Award	Best Supporting Actress	Tatiana Pauhofová	Won	
2025	32nd Czech Lion Awards	Czech Lion Award	Best Screenplay	Jiří Mádl	Won	
2025	32nd Czech Lion Awards	Czech Lion Award	Best Editing	Filip Malásek	Nominated	
2025	32nd Czech Lion Awards	Czech Lion Award	Best Cinematography	Martin Žiaran	Nominated	
2025	32nd Czech Lion Awards	Czech Lion Award	Best Stage Design	Petr Kunc	Nominated	
2025	32nd Czech Lion Awards	Czech Lion Award	Best Makeup and Hairstyling	Adéla Anděla Bursová	Nominated	
2025	32nd Czech Lion Awards	Czech Lion Award	Best Costume Design	Katarína Štrbová Bieliková	Nominated	
2025	32nd Czech Lion Awards	Czech Lion Award	Best Sound	Viktor Ekrt	Won	
2025	32nd Czech Lion Awards	Czech Lion Award	Best Music	Simon Goff	Nominated	
2025	32nd Czech Lion Awards	Czech Lion Award	Film Fans Award	Waves	Won	
2025	14th Sun in a Net Awards	Sun in a Net Award	Best Film	Waves	Won	
2025	14th Sun in a Net Awards	Sun in a Net Award	Best Director	Jiří Mádl	Won	
2025	14th Sun in a Net Awards	Sun in a Net Award	Best Screenplay	Jiří Mádl	Won	
2025	14th Sun in a Net Awards	Sun in a Net Award	Best Actor in Leading Role	Vojtěch Vodochodský	Won	
2025	14th Sun in a Net Awards	Sun in a Net Award	Best Actress in Leading Role	Táňa Pauhofová	Nominated	
2025	14th Sun in a Net Awards	Sun in a Net Award	Best Supporting Actor	Tomáš Maštalír	Nominated	
2025	14th Sun in a Net Awards	Sun in a Net Award	Best Cinematography	Martin Žiaran	Won	
2025	14th Sun in a Net Awards	Sun in a Net Award	Best Editing	Filip Malásek	Won	
2025	14th Sun in a Net Awards	Sun in a Net Award	Best Sound	Viktor Ekrt	Won	
2025	14th Sun in a Net Awards	Sun in a Net Award	Best Music	Simon Goff	Nominated	
2025	14th Sun in a Net Awards	Sun in a Net Award	Stage Design	Petr Kunc	Nominated	
2025	14th Sun in a Net Awards	Sun in a Net Award	Best Visual Effects	Ivo Marák, Miro Gál	Won	
2025	14th Sun in a Net Awards	Sun in a Net Award	Best Makeup and Hairstyling	Adéla Anděla Bursová, Jiřina Pahlerová	Nominated	

== See also ==
- List of submissions to the 97th Academy Awards for Best International Feature Film
- List of Czech submissions for the Academy Award for Best International Feature Film
