= Metoda Markovič: Straka =

- Genre: Crime
- Written by: Jaroslav Hruška
- Directed by: Tomáš Pavlíček; Jan Vejnar
- Starring: Petr Lněnička; Maxmilián Kocek
- Country of origin: Czech Republic
- Original language: Czech
- No. of seasons: 1
- No. of episodes: 6

Production
- Cinematography: Ondřej Belica
- Editor: Jakub Vansa
- Production company: Blue Hills Pictures

Original release
- Network: Oneplay
- Release: January 9, 2026

Related
- Metoda Markovič: Hojer

Metoda Markovič: Straka (The Markovič Method: Straka) is a Czech crime series. It serves as second season of Metoda Markovič: Hojer. It focuses on investigation of murders committed by Jiří Straka which was led by Jiří Markovič who previously caught another serial killer Ladislav Hojer. Straka was a minor who raped 11 women and murdered 3 of them in Spring 1985 during period of preparations for Spartakiad celebrations which earned him nickname Spartakiad Killer.

The series premiered in September 2025 at the Serial Killer International Festival of TV and Web Series in Brno.

== Plot ==
Spring 1985, Markovič just closed Hojer case believing he just concluded biggest case of his career while the communist party is preparing the most massive sporting event of its time - the Spartakiad. Another dangerous serial killer starts rampaging through the streets of Prague. Police investigators led by Markovič find themselves under enormous pressure from state authorities. The race against time begins.

== Cast ==
- Petr Lněnička as mjr. Jiří Markovič, elite police investigator and protagonist of the series.
- Maxmilián Kocek as Jiří Straka, teenager who is a dangerous serial killer and the main antagonist of the series.
- Sarah Haváčová as Eva Markovičová, Markovič's wife
- Anna Michalcová as Monika Markovičová, Markovič's daughter
- Michal Isteník as MUDr. Petr Řemen, sexuologist and psychiatrist who is Markovič's friend.
- Václav Neužil as kpt. Josef Vilímek, Markovič's colleague and friend who is dealing with losing his wife. He is based on Antonín Jarolímek.
- Adam Mišík as por. Vlasta Červenka, young hot-headed investigator who must deal with incoming fatherhood. He is based on Lubomír Fiala.
- David Prachař as plk. Jaroslav Houlík, chief of murder department who plans to retire but Spartakiad killer case forces him to show personal bravery in the face of the General.
- Marián Mitaš as General Pavel Alois, chief of StB who follows the investigation of a case that can disrupt the Spartakiad.
- Přemysl Boublík as Karel Koula, new investigator who joins Markovič's team.
- Sára Rychlíková as Irena Červenková (Marečková), secretary at murder department and Vlasta's wife.
- Vojtěch Kotek as Ing. Jaromír Stahlwerk, murderer whom Markovič visits to discuss the case. He is based on Vladimír Tekverk
- Kristýna Badinková Nováková as Karla Krejzová, defense attorney.
- Robert Mikluš as Straka's father
- Hana Kusnjerová as Straka's mother
- Otto Dušek as Straka's friend
- Matěj Havelka as Straka's friend
- Katarína Mišejková as Straka's girlfriend
- Kateřina Falbrová as Straka's girlfriend
- Jiří Štrébl as vrátný v ubytovně
- Jiří Panzner as Irena's father
- Tereza Vilišová as Irena's mother
- Marek Sendecký as Janko Šerkézy
- Ema Klangová Businská as interrogated girl
- Klára Cibulková as Silovodová
- Adam Ernest as Straka's teacher
- Natálie Řehořová as tutoress
- Kristýna Nováková as Lada Grygarová
- Daniel Rous as otec Lady Grygarové
- Radek Lajfr as Vladěna, Monika's boyfriend
- Vladimír Lach as Stanislav Ponk

== Production ==
Nova was originally producing the series under name Straka. On 4 April 2024 the series was officially announced as Metoda Markovič: Straka. During December 2025, Nova announced the series will premiere in Spring 2026.

== Episodes ==
Episode		Directed by	Written by	Original air date (Voyo)	Original air date (Nova)	Czech viewers (millions)
1	Mistři	Tomáš Pavlíček, Jan Vejnar	Jaroslav Hruška	9 January 2026	TBA	
2	Profilace	Tomáš Pavlíček, Jan Vejnar	Jaroslav Hruška	16 January 2026	TBA	
3	Strach	Tomáš Pavlíček, Jan Vejnar	Jaroslav Hruška	23 January 2026	TBA	
4	Syn	Tomáš Pavlíček, Jan Vejnar	Jaroslav Hruška	30 January 2026	TBA	
5	Spravedlnost	Tomáš Pavlíček, Jan Vejnar	Jaroslav Hruška	6 February 2026	TBA	
6	Trest	Tomáš Pavlíček, Jan Vejnar	Jaroslav Hruška	13 February 2026	TBA	

== Future ==
Writer of series Jaroslav Hruška stated in an interview for Express FM that he plans to make two additional series of The Markovič Method after Straka. The series would show work of the police at the turn of the 1980s and 1990s. He noted that interest of audience is to decide whether these series will be filmed.
