= Czech Lion Award for Unique Contribution to Czech Film =

Czech film award

- Country: Czech Republic
- First award: 1993
- Currently held by: Helena Bezděk Fraňková
- Website: https://www.filmovaakademie.cz

Czech Lion Award for Unique Contribution to Czech Film is an annual award given to person who contributed to Czech cinema by his or her life work.

== Winners ==
Year	Recipient	Note	Notable films
1993	František Vláčil	Director	Marketa Lazarová
1994	Jan Švankmajer	Director and animator	Alice
1995	Karel Kachyňa	Director	
1996	Jiří Menzel	Director and Academy Award winner	Closely Watched Trains
1997	Miloš Forman	Director and Academy Award winner	The Firemen's Ball
1998	Jiří Krejčík	Director	Higher Principle
1999	Miroslav Ondříček	Cinematographer	Intimate Lighting
2000	Věra Chytilová	Director	Daisies
2001	Otakar Vávra	Director	Witchhammer
2002	Juraj Jakubisko	Director	The Millennial Bee
2003	Theodor Pištěk	Costume designer	
2004	Stella Zázvorková	Actress	
2005	Jan Němec	Director	Diamonds of the Night
2006	Ivan Passer	Director	Intimate Lighting
2007	Vojtěch Jasný	Director	All My Good Countrymen
2008	Juraj Herz	Director	The Cremator
2009	Jana Brejchová	Actress	
2010	Zdeněk Svěrák	Screenwriter and actor	Kolya
2011	Josef Somr	Actor	
2012	Karel Černý	Art director and production designer	Amadeus
2013	Vladimír Körner	Screenwriter	Adelheid
2014	Drahomíra Vihanová	Director	The Fortress
2015	Stanislav Milota	Cinematographer	
2016	Karlovy Vary International Film Festival		
2017	Alois Fišárek	Editor	
2018	Věra Plívová-Šimková	Director	Krakonoš a lyžníci
2018	Hynek Bočan	Director	
2021	Ivo Špajl	Audio engineer	
2022	Marcela Pittermannová	Dramaturge	
2023	Vladimír Smutný	Cinematographer	
2024	Mario Klemens	Film music conductor	
2024	Karel Smyczek	Director, actor and screenwriter	Why?
2025	Helena Bezděk Fraňková	Director of Státní fond audiovize	
