= Jiří Markovič =

Czech policeman and writer (1942 – 2022)

- Born: 16 November 1942; Boleradice, Czechoslovakia
- Died: 20 October 2022 (aged 79); Czech Republic
- Occupations: police investigator; author

Jiří Markovič (16 November 1942 – 20 October 2022) was a Czech policeman and criminologist who is best known for catching serial killers Ladislav Hojer and Jiří Straka. During his career he caught 7 murderers who received capital punishment.

== Biography ==
Jiří Markovič was born in Boleradice in 1942. His family later moved to Hrubý Jeseník.

Markovič joined the police in 1964 and became part of the investigation department in 1966. He was part of the investigation department of the capital city of Prague from 1977.

One of his first cases was the murder of a senior woman, Božena Novotná, in January 1978. She was beaten to death in her apartment where she lived with her daughter Eva, granddaughter, and also the daughter's boyfriend Jiří Žítek. Investigations proved that Žítek constantly terrorized Božena and Eva mentally and physically, especially when he got drunk. He also got drunk on the evening of the murder and started to demand 11 crowns from Božena, which she owed him for a purchase. She didn't have any change with her, so she offered him a one-hundred-crown banknote. But he didn't want it and started attacking her. Žítek confessed the murder and was sentenced to 20 years in prison.

Markovič also investigated the murder committed by Jan Tvrdík in 1978. Tvrdík brutally murdered his mother-in-law and tried to murder his two children as revenge for his wife's affairs. The children survived by playing dead. Tvrdík also planned to kill his wife. He was executed in 1980. Markovič stated that Tvrdík was the only person he was ever totally certain to deserve capital punishment. Tvrdík was the first criminal convicted by Markovič who was sentenced to death.

In 1979 Markovič investigated the murder of a 16-year-old girl committed by Vladimír Tekverk. Tekverk went down in the history of Czech criminology as a sadistic, highly intelligent murderer who managed to keep his deviance under control for years, but eventually lost his inner battle. Tekverk confessed the murder to his wife and during interrogation he wanted to deny that he had murdered because of his disorder and wanted to claim that the girl was his lover and he killed her because she was blackmailing him. Markovič convinced him to not deny his disorder and possibly saved Tekverk's life. Markovič and Tekverk became friends and stayed in contact after Tekverk's imprisonment. Tekverk helped Markovič understand sadistic murderers.

Markovič investigated the murder committed by Antonín Vorel in 1980. Vorel tried to rape Marie Jandová, then strangled her and inflicted 34 stab wounds upon her death. Police identified 400 people, among whom they were looking for the perpetrators. Vorel had no alibi and eventually confessed the murder. He was sentenced to death but an appeal court changed it to 25 years in prison. Markovič stated he was glad that Vorel wasn't executed noting his reduced sanity confirmed by expert reports.

The same year Markovič was asked by his colleagues to investigate a cold case of double homicide that occurred in Prokop Valley on 8 July 1968. Markovič managed to get a new testimony and eventually convicted František Zenker of the murder. Zenker was sentenced to 25 years in prison.

Markovič investigated a brutal murder in a well-known restaurant "U Dvou koček" which shocked the public in 1981. The local cook was beaten to death with an iron rod. Then both of his hands were cut off at the wrists. After a difficult investigation Markovič proved that the murder was committed by Jiří Doležal and his accomplices Baláž and Zháňal. Doležal died of cancer in prison before the final court decision.

Markovič caught the serial killer Ladislav Hojer in 1982 and managed to convince him to confess of killing 5 women. Markovič believed that Hojer killed more victims but his superiors were afraid that Hojer might start to lie and confess to murders that he didn't commit and pushed Markovič to end the investigation quickly. Hojer was executed in 1986.

Markovič investigated crimes committed by Miroslav Stehlík who raped 17 women and killed two. Stehlík was executed in 1986.

In 1985 Markovič investigated the Spartakiad killer case which became Markovič's most publicly famous case. Markovič caught serial killer Jiří Straka who was responsible for 11 attacks on women in Prague between February and May 1985, when he was aged 15 and 16, three of which were fatal. Markovič managed to convince Straka to confess the murders. Straka was a minor and thus received only 10 years of prison. Straka was released in 2004 after he spent 19 years in a psychiatric hospital and in prison. Markovič himself met Straka after his release to make sure he doesn't start killing again. Markovič stated that Straka might have really changed.

Markovič became the head of one of the two homicide departments of the Prague police ("Prague mordparta") in 1986. Under his leadership the department managed to have a 100% success rate investigating murders for 6 years in a row.

Markovič investigated the case of the last Czech who was sentenced to death, Zdeněk Vocásek who murdered 2 people in 1987 and tried to murder his roommate. Vocásek was saved by the fall of the Communist regime and banning of capital punishment.

Markovič participated in the investigation of the Orlík killers, which was a cooperation between Prague policemen led by Markovič and Central Bohemian policemen led by his friend Josef Doucha. Markovič stated that the Prague department didn't have enough men at the time so Markovič let Doucha and his department take over the investigation for a bottle of rum.

Markovič retired in late 1999. Following his retirement he focused on writing. Markovič died of cancer on 20 October 2022 before his 80th birthday. His funeral took place a week after his death and was attended by his family and former colleagues.

== Personal life ==
Markovič was married to Eva Markovičová with whom he had a daughter Monika and a son Jiří.

== Popular culture ==
Investigation of Antonín Vorel case inspired an episode of Malý pitaval z velkého města called Kuchařinka.

Markovič is the main protagonist of 2024 TV series Metoda Markovič: Hojer which chronicles investigation of Ladislav Hojer case. Markovič is played by Petr Lněnička. Markovič himself collaborated with filmmakers before his death. Continuation Metoda Markovič: Straka chronicling investigation of Jiří Straka was released in 2026.

Metoda Markovič was accompanied by documentary series Případy Jiřího Markoviče.

== Works ==
- MARKOVIČ, Jiří; ŠULC, Viktorín. Lovec přízraků : Vraždy, které šokovaly republiku. Praha : Epocha, 2008. 432 s. ISBN 978-80-87027-59-2.
- ŠÁMAL, Petr; MARKOVIČ, Jiří. Kriminalista : legenda pražské mordparty deviantům na stopě. Praha : Epocha, 2015. 302 s. ISBN 978-80-7425-248-8.
