= Janyska =

Janyska and Janyška are Slavic surnames derived from a diminutive of the given name Jan. Notable people with the surname include:

- Maria Janyska (born 1962), Polish local government official, economist, and M.P.
- Petr Janyška (born 1953), Czech diplomat and translator
