= Libuše Jarcovjáková =

Czech photographer and educator (born 1952)

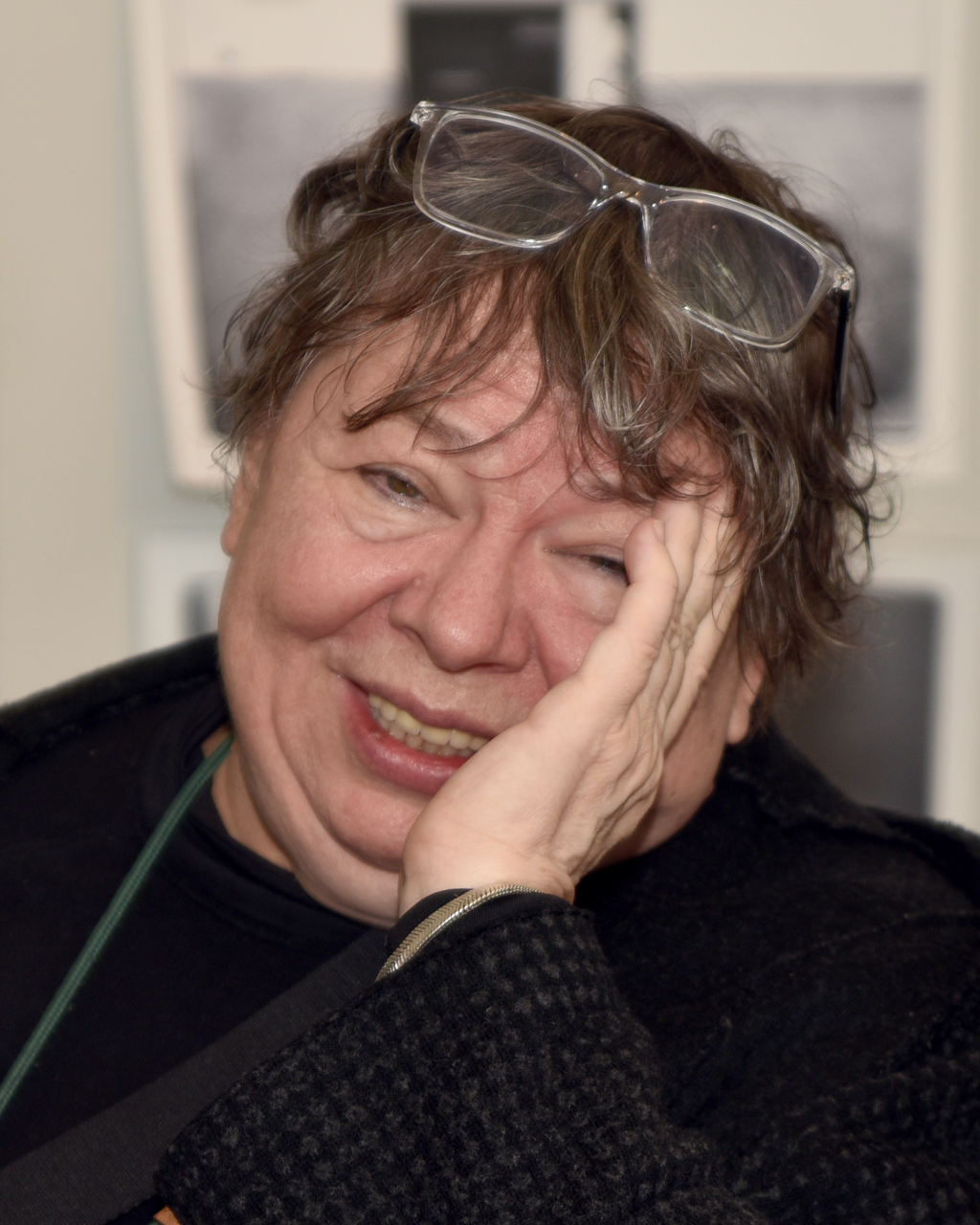

Libuše Jarcovjáková (born 1952) is a Czech photographer and educator, based in Prague. Jarcovjáková photographed nightlife, minority groups and marginalised people in the 1970s and 1980s in Prague and West Berlin, and made self portraits. She made diaristic work of her hedonistic lifestyle, and of the inhabitants of a clandestine gay bar that she visited almost nightly, in 1980s Prague, where the Communist state was institutionally homophobic.

== Early life and education ==
Jarcovjáková was born in Prague in what was then the Czechoslovak Socialist Republic. Her parents were painters. She studied for an MA at the Film and TV School of the Academy of Performing Arts in Prague.

== Life and work ==
At the end of the 1970s she undertook a creative residency in Japan for several months. In 1985 Jarcovjáková moved to West Berlin and in 1992 returned to Prague. She has been teaching photography since the 1990s, currently doing so at the College of Graphic Design and the Secondary School of Graphic Design (VOŠ a SPŠ Grafická v Praze) in Prague.

Jarcovjáková's written diaries and photographs from Prague, West Berlin and Tokyo between 1971 and 1987, were published in the 2016 book Černé Roky (The Black Years).

Between 1983 and 1985, Jarcovjáková photographed the inhabitants of a clandestine gay bar in Prague, called T-Club, which she frequented visited almost every night, using black and white film and a flash. Her other subjects at this time were herself and Vietnamese and Cuban economic migrants. Though sex between people of the same gender was decriminalised in Czechoslovakia in 1962, people continued to be imprisoned for being openly gay. Because the work depicted her own sexual deviance as well as that of people at T-Club, it was not shown until 2008 and was published in 2019 as Evokativ. Sean O'Hagan, writing in The Guardian, described the work as having an "edgy diaristic approach, laying bare a life lived recklessly amid a period of political repression" [. . .] "images that pay little attention to formal concerns, but nevertheless capture a time and milieu in an uncompromising way."

Jarcovjáková's life and work were the subject of the 2024 feature documentary film I'm Not Everything I Want to Be, directed by Klára Tasovská, which premiered at the 74th Berlin International Film Festival.

== Publications ==
=== Publications by Jarcovjáková ===
- Černé Roky: 1971–1987, [The Black Years: 1971–1987]. Prague: Nakladatelství Wo-men, 2016. ISBN 9788090523968. Photographs, letters and journal entries. In English and Czech. Includes booklet titled The Black Years / English trial version, in English.
- Evokativ. Prague: Untitled, 2019. ISBN 978-80-907568-0-9. With texts by Jarcovjáková and Lucie Černá. Edition of 1000 copies.

=== Publications paired with others ===
- Ženy 60+. Prague: Nakladatelství Wo-men, 2018. Text by Pavla Frýdlová and photographs by Jarcovjáková. ISBN 9788090523975.

== Exhibitions ==
- Anamnesis / Remembering, Galerie 1. Patro (Gallery 1st Floor), Prague, 2012
- T-Club, Langhans café, Prague, 2019
- Evokativ, Église Sainte-Anne d'Arles, Rencontres d'Arles, Arles, France, 2019

== Awards ==
- The Photographer of the Year, Association of Professional Photographers of the Czech Republic
