= Lidové noviny =

Czech daily newspaper

- Lidove noviny cover (15 September 2018)
- Type: Daily newspaper
- Format: Berliner
- Owner: Mafra
- Publisher: Lidové noviny AS
- Editor: Petr Bušta
- Founded: 1893
- Political alignment: right of center, liberal conservative, formerly pro-ODS, now pro-ANO 2011
- Language: Czech
- Headquarters: Karla Engliše 519/11, Prague
- Circulation: 43,171 (as of 2011)
- ISSN: 1213-1385
- Website: lidovky.cz

Lidové noviny (Czech pronunciation: [ˈlɪdovɛː ˈnovɪnɪ]; "The People's News") is a daily newspaper published in Prague, the Czech Republic. It is the oldest Czech daily still in print, and a newspaper of record. It is a national news daily covering political, economic, cultural and scientific affairs, mostly with a centre-right, conservative view. It often hosts commentaries and opinions of prominent personalities from the Czech Republic and from abroad.

== History and profile ==
Lidové noviny was founded by Adolf Stránský in 1893 in Brno. Its high prestige was due to the number of famous Czech personalities that were contributing—writers, politicians and philosophers—and its attention toward foreign politics and culture. It was also the first Czech daily publishing political cartoons. Its publication was interrupted during World War II. The newspaper changed its name to Svobodné noviny ("The Free News") after the liberation before returning to the original name from 9 May 1948. It was closed down in 1952.

In 1987, a group of political dissidents led by Jiří Ruml, Jiří Dienstbier, Ladislav Hejdánek, and Jan Petránek recommenced the publication in a monthly samizdat version. In the autumn, two "zero editions" were published and in January 1988 the first edition was issued. The paper has its headquarters in Prague. It had been published legally and daily, both since November 1989 and Spring 1990 respectively. Years later, the newspaper merged with dissolved Lidová demokracie, from which they inherited the blue colour of the title.

In 1998, Lidové noviny became part of the German group Rheinisch-Bergische Druckerei und Verlagsgesellschaft GmbH (the publisher of the daily Rheinische Post in Germany) and its Czech subsidiary Mafra, that is also publisher of the second largest Czech newspaper Mladá fronta Dnes, the Czech edition of the freesheet Metro, the TV music channel Óčko, the radio stations Expresradio and Rádio Classic FM and the weekly music magazine Filter. In 2013, Mafra became a subsidiary of the Agrofert group, a company owned by the Czech Prime Minister (as of 2018), Andrej Babiš. The publisher of the daily is Lidové noviny AS. The paper was published in Berliner format. In July 2024, it was announced that Lidové Noviny ceased imprint publications the same year in August.

== Circulation ==
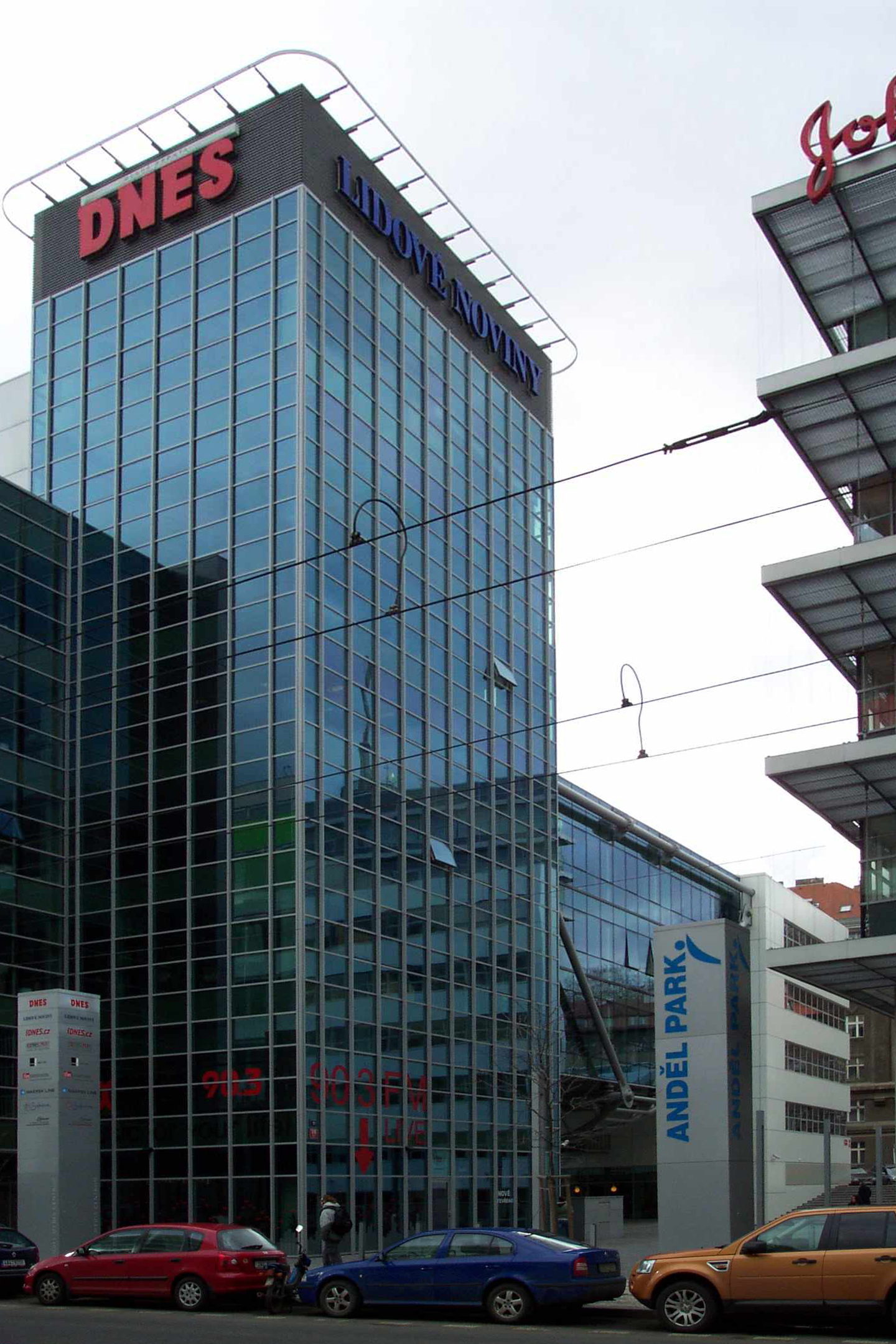
Headquarters of Lidové Noviny and Mladá fronta Dnes in Prague

Lidové noviny had a circulation of 270,000 copies in June 1990. The circulation of the paper was 91,000 copies in 2002. In October 2003, the paper had a circulation of 77,558 copies. In December 2004 the paper had a circulation of 70,593 copies. It was 72,000 copies for 2004 as a whole.

The 2007 circulation of the paper was 70,680 copies. In 2008, it had a circulation of 70,413 copies and reached up to 232,000 readers per day. The circulation of Lidové noviny was 58,543 copies in 2009, 49,920 copies in 2010 and 43,171 copies in 2011. By 2024, the circulation fell to 17,514 copies.

== Editors ==
This list includes only editors-in-chief of the new Lidové noviny.

- Jiří Ruml (1988–1990)
- Rudolf Zeman (1990–1991)
- Jaroslav Veis (1991–1992)
- Tomáš Smetánka (1992–1993)
- Jaromír Štětina (1993–1994)
- Jiří Kryšpín (1994) – interim
- Libor Ševčík (1994–1996)
- Jefim Fištejn (1996–1997)
- Pavel Šafr (1997–2000)
- Veselin Vačkov (2000–2009)
- Dalibor Balšínek (2009–2013)
- István Léko (2013–2021)
- Petr Bušta (2021–)

== See also ==
- List of newspapers in the Czech Republic
- Concentration of media ownership in the Czech Republic
- Petr Janyška
