= Boleradice =

- Market town
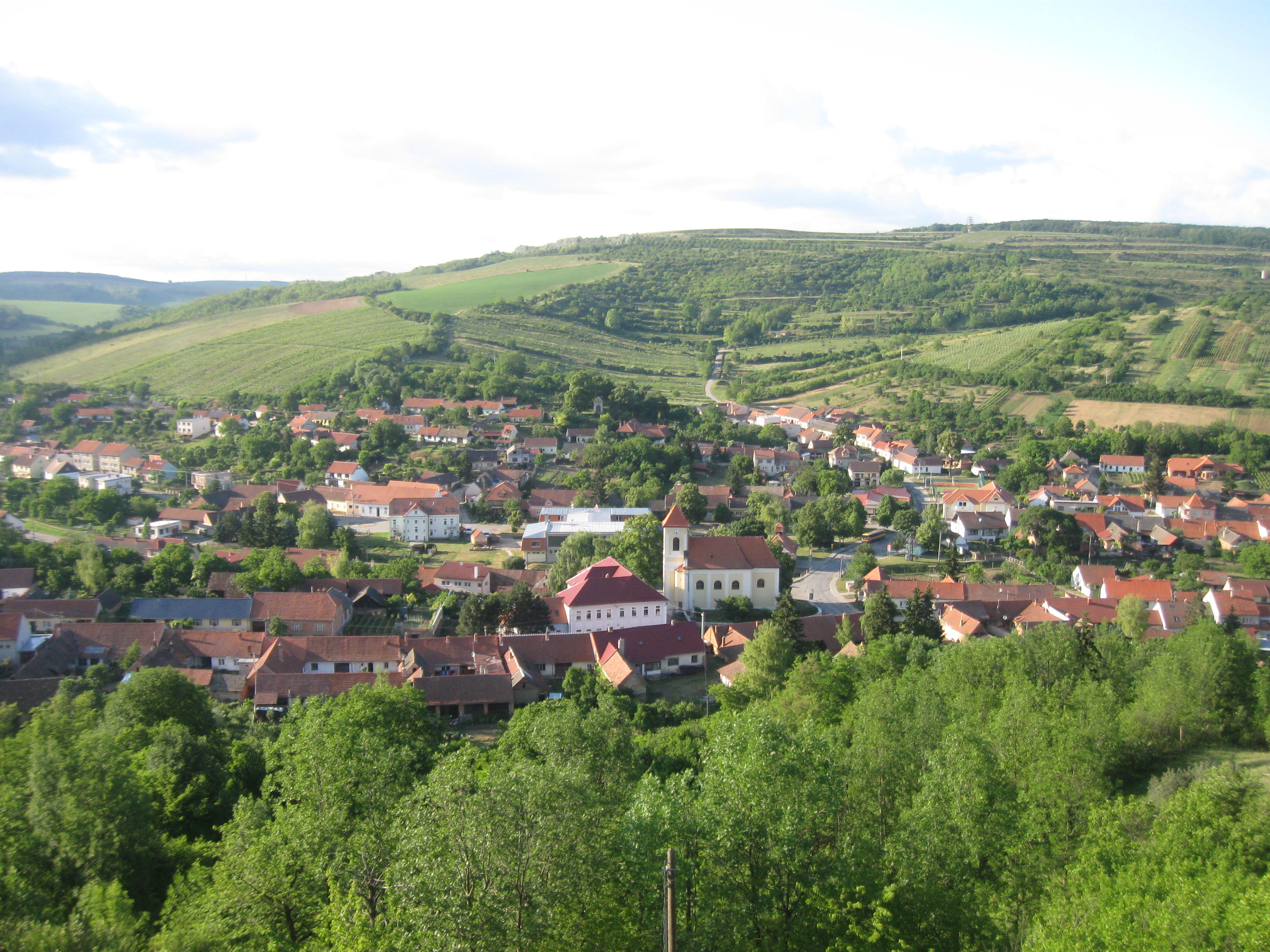
- Boleradice from the Paseky hill

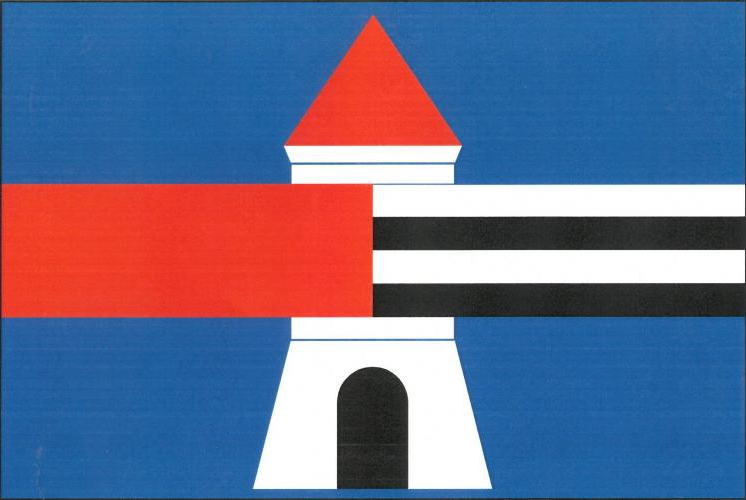
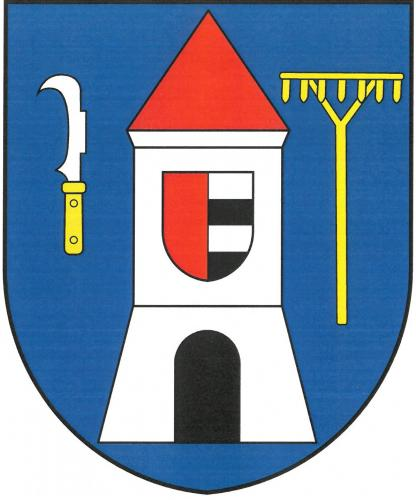
- Flag Coat of arms

- Location in the Czech Republic
- Coordinates: 48°58′0″N 16°48′50″E
- Country: Czech Republic
- Region: South Moravian
- District: Břeclav
- First mentioned: 1141

Area
  - Total: 12.11 km^{2} (4.68 sq mi)
- Elevation: 205 m (673 ft)

Population (2026-01-01)
  - Total: 949
  - Density: 78.4/km^{2} (203/sq mi)
- Time zone: UTC+1 (CET)
  - Summer (DST): UTC+2 (CEST)
- Postal code: 691 12
- Website: www.boleradice.cz

Boleradice (Czech pronunciation: [ˈbolɛraɟɪtsɛ]) is a market town in Břeclav District in the South Moravian Region of the Czech Republic. It has about 900 inhabitants.

== Geography ==
Boleradice is located about 23 kilometres (14 mi) north of Břeclav and 29 km (18 mi) south of Brno. It lies in the Ždánice Forest range. The highest point at 382 m (1,253 ft) above sea level. The Haraska Stream flows through the market town.

== History ==
The first written mention of Boleradice is in a deed of bishop Jindřich Zdík from 1141. Until 1358, the village was owned by the Lords of Klobouky. From 1358 to 1532, it was owned by the Lords of Kunštát. In 1532, the village was bought by the Lords of Víckov. During their rule, in 1537, Boleradice was promoted to a market town. As a result of the Battle of White Mountain in 1620, properties of the Lords of Víckov were confiscated and Boleradice was acquired by the Jesuits in Brno. The Boleradice estate was subsequently annexed to the Diváky estate, which remained so until the establishment of an independent municipality in 1848.

== Demographics ==
Historical population

Year	Pop.	±%
1869	1,026	—
1880	1,084	+5.7%
1890	1,142	+5.4%
1900	1,254	+9.8%
1910	1,398	+11.5%

Year	Pop.	±%
1921	1,386	−0.9%
1930	1,376	−0.7%
1950	1,045	−24.1%
1961	1,093	+4.6%
1970	995	−9.0%

Year	Pop.	±%
1980	860	−13.6%
1991	784	−8.8%
2001	850	+8.4%
2011	860	+1.2%
2021	901	+4.8%

Source: Censuses

== Economy ==
Boleradice is known for viticulture. It lies in the Velkopavlovická wine subregion.

== Transport ==
There are no railways or major roads passing through the municipality.

== Sights ==
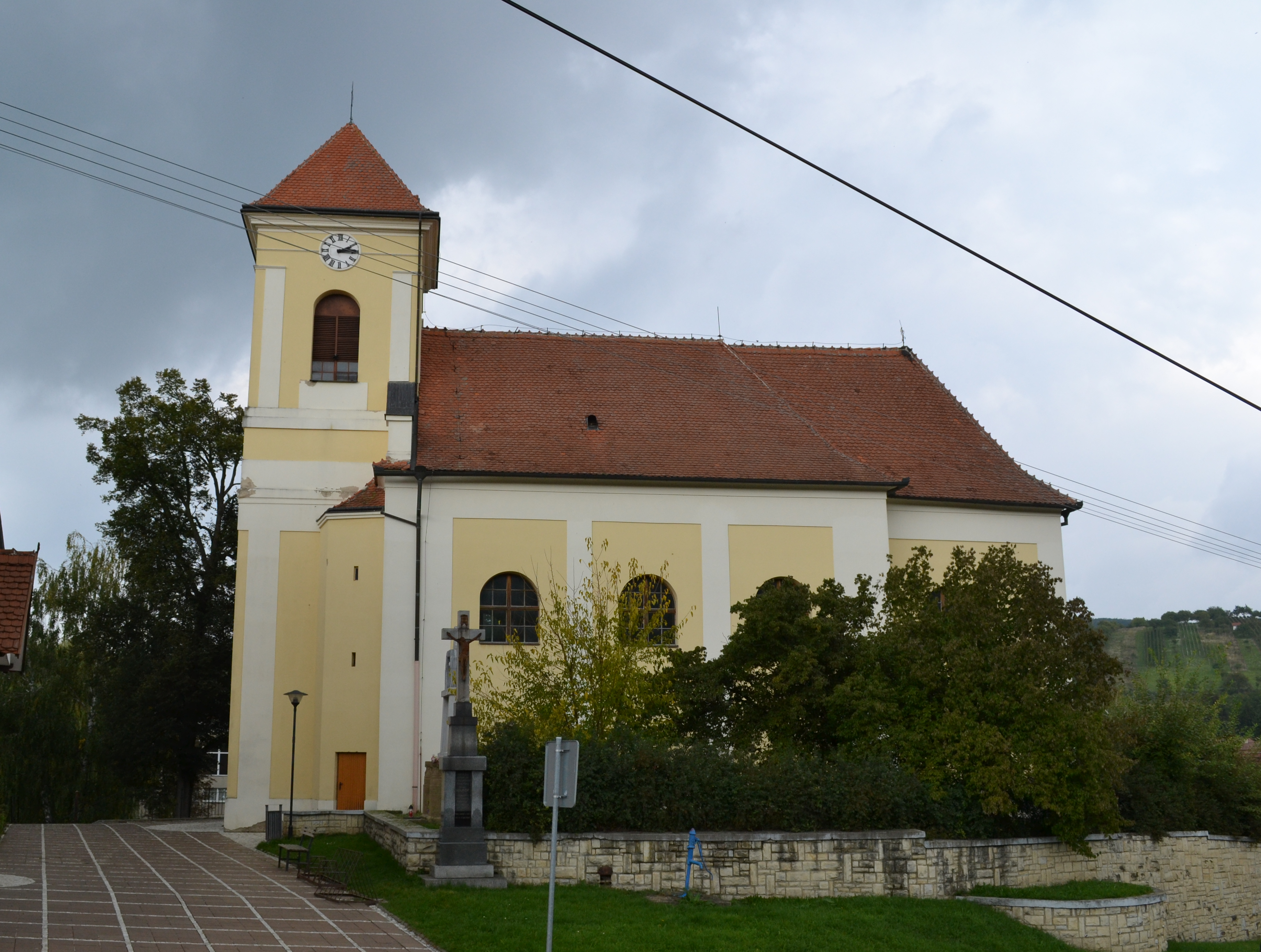
Church of Saint John the Baptist

The main landmark of Boleradice is the Church of Saint John the Baptist. It was built in the late Romanesque style in the second half of the 13th century. In the mid-18th century, it was rebuilt in the Baroque style.

== Notable people ==
- Jiří Markovič (1942–2022), criminalist
