= Smysl pro tumor =

- Genre: Comedy; Drama
- Written by: Matěj Podzimek; Leander Verdievel (author of original)
- Directed by: Tereza Kopáčová
- Starring: Filip Březina
- Country of origin: Czech Republic
- Original language: Czech
- No. of seasons: 1
- No. of episodes: 8

Production
- Executive producer: Romana Špiková
- Producer: Matěj Stehlík
- Cinematography: Pavel Berkovič
- Running time: 58-61 minutes

Original release
- Network: Czech Television
- Release: January 7 – February 25, 2024

Smysl pro tumor (Sense of Tumour) is a comedy drama television series directed by Tereza Kopáčová. It is an adaptation of Belgian series Gevoel voor Tumor. It started broadcast on 7 January 2024.

First 2 episodes were presented at 2023 Serial Killer Festival. Each episode ends with short interviews with young people who have completed cancer treatment and at the same time actively participated in the Fuck Cancer patient project.

== Plot ==
The story is about a young student of medicine Filip who is diagnosed with cancer. Disease changes Filip's life and the lives of his family. Despite his illness, Filip finds love and starts to appreciate his own family members that support him despite their own struggles.

== Cast ==
- Filip Březina as Filip Kalina
- Alžběta Malá as Hanka Vaňková, Antonín's granddaughter who becomes Filip's girlfriend
- Jiří Bartoška as Antonín Vaněk, Hanka's grandfather and Filip's roommate in hospital
- Tereza Brodská as Jarka Kalinová, Filip's mother
- Pavel Řezníček as Mirek Kalina, Filip's father
- Natálie Řehořová as Zuzana Stránská, Filip's sister
- Radim Jíra as Olda Stránský, Zuzana's husband
- Viktor Krčmář as Lojzík Stránský, Zuzana's son
- Mikuláš Voborský as Pepík Stránský, Zuzana's son
- Robert Nebřenský as Brukner
- Aleš Petráš as Levinský
- Pavlína Balner as Alice
- Mark Kristián Hochman as Vojta, Filip's friend

== Episodes ==
Episode	Written by	Original air date	Czech viewers (millions)
Episode 1	Matěj Podzimek	7 January 2024	1.266
Episode 2	Matěj Podzimek	14 January 2024	1.268
Episode 3	Matěj Podzimek	21 January 2024	1.275
Episode 4	Matěj Podzimek	28 January 2024	1.211
Episode 5	Matěj Podzimek	4 February 2024	1.184
Episode 6	Matěj Podzimek	11 February 2024	1.205
Episode 7	Matěj Podzimek	18 February 2024	1.171
Episode 8	Matěj Podzimek	25 February 2024	1.208

== Production ==
The series was filmed in Hradec Králové and Pardubice.

== Reception ==
Smysl pro tumor was highly praised by audiences who liked story for its emotional load and actors for their performances. Addition of interviews with young people who have completed cancer treatment was also praised.

The series was a huge success for Czech Television. Series was viewed approximately by 1,350,000 viewers (31.05% audience share). With retrospective views the series was watched by 2,970,000 viewers.
