= Mario Klemens =

Czech conductor (1936–2025)

- Born: 3 October 1936; Chlumec nad Cidlinou, Czechoslovakia
- Died: 11 January 2025 (aged 88); Prague, Czech Republic
- Education: Academy of Performing Arts in Prague
- Occupations: Conductor, Teacher
- Children: 1

Mario Klemens (3 October 1936 – 11 January 2025) was a Czech conductor and educator of conducting. He was a conductor for the Film Symphony Orchestra.

== Life ==
Klemens was born on 3 October 1936 in Chlumec nad Cidlinou. He was awarded 1st mention at the 1966 International Besançon Competition for Young Conductors (no first prize was awarded that year). In 1967, he graduated in conducting from the Academy of Performing Arts in Prague. With the Film Symphony Orchestra, has recorded music for more than 150 films.

He died on 11 January 2025, at the age of 88. On 22 January 2025, the Czech Film and Television Academy announced, that he would be awarded the Czech Lion Award for Unique Contribution to Czech Film, together with Czech film director, actor and screenwriter Karel Smyczek.

His son Adam Klemens (born 1967) is a Czech composer and also conductor.
