= Dobré ráno, Brno! =

- Genre: Comedy
- Written by: Jan Prušinovský; Tomáš Holeček
- Directed by: Jan Prušinovský
- Starring: Jan Kolařík; Zuzana Zlatohlávková; Ondřej Kokorský; Simona Lewandowská; Vojtěch Hrabák
- Country of origin: Czech Republic
- Original language: Czech
- No. of seasons: 2
- No. of episodes: 16

Production
- Running time: 26-30 minutes

Original release
- Network: Czech Television
- Release: January 9, 2023 – February 27, 2024

Dobré ráno, Brno! (Good Morning, Brno!) is a comedy television series directed by Jan Prušinovský, who also co-wrote the screenplay with Tomáš Holeček. Prušinovský was inspired by Czech TV show Dobré ráno. The series he exaggerates and parodies Dobré ráno, its crew and the behind-the-scenes situations. Prušinovský wrote the script for the series based on his own experience when he himself was a guest on the Dobré ráno broadcast in the Brno studio. The series stars Jan Kolařík, Zuzana Zlatohlávková, Ondřej Kokorský, Simona Lewandowská, Roman Slovák, Tereza Volánková, Ivana Hloužková and Nikola Mucha.

The series was first shown in September 2022 at the Serial Killer festival in Brno. The first part of the series had its television premiere on ČT1 on 9 January 2023 but Czech Television published it ahead of time on iVysílání on 31 December 2022. On 5 March 2023 Prušinovský announced that series was renewed for second season that would start filming in April 2023. In May 2023 ČT announced that season 2 is likely to start broadcast in January 2024 and in November 2023 specified that it will start broadcast on 8 January 2024. The first season had average rating 554,000 viewers including online views (20.12% share).

== Cast ==
- Jan Kolařík as director Mirek Kurš
- Zuzana Zlatohlávková as moderator Radka Vrbíková
- Ondřej Kokorský as moderator Cyril Lomný
- Simona Lewandowská as weather moderator Andrea Baďurová
- Ivana Hloužková as costume designer Dáda Kopáčová
- Nikola Mucha as costume designer Pája
- Tereza Volánková as assistant director Alžběta
- Slávek Bílský as cook Slávek
- Roman Slovák as homeless Luboš
- Roman Nevěčný as Horst
- Vladimír Hauser as Mára
- Josef Hron as taxi driver
- Pavel Čeněk Vaculík as Miki
- Mark Kristián Hochman as Luki
- Beáta Hrnčiříková as producer Johana
- Vojtěch Hrabák as dramaturg Vít Šmarda
- Jan Jankovský as Hynek, Radka's husband

== Episodes ==
=== Season 1 ===
Episode	Written by	Original air date	Czech viewers (millions)
Episode 1	Jan Prušinovský	9 January 2023	0.449
Episode 2	Jan Prušinovský	16 January 2023	0.507
Episode 3	Jan Prušinovský	23 January 2023	0.422
Episode 4	Jan Prušinovský	30 January 2023	0.440
Episode 5	Tomáš Holeček and Jan Prušinovský	6 February 2023	0.397
Episode 6	Jan Prušinovský	13 February 2023	0.363
Episode 7	Jan Prušinovský, Tomáš Holeček	20 February 2023	0.373
Episode 8	Jan Prušinovský	27 February 2023	0.413

=== Season 2 ===
Episode	Written by	Original air date	Czech viewers (millions)
Episode 1	Jan Prušinovský, Tomáš Holeček	8 January 2024	0.520
Episode 2	Jan Prušinovský, Tomáš Holeček	15 January 2024	0.557
Episode 3	Jan Prušinovský, Tomáš Holeček	22 January 2024	0.569
Episode 4	Jan Prušinovský, Tomáš Holeček	29 January 2024	0.490
Episode 5	Jan Prušinovský, Tomáš Holeček	5 February 2024	0.434
Episode 6	Jan Prušinovský, Tomáš Holeček	12 February 2024	0.463
Episode 7	Jan Prušinovský, Tomáš Holeček	19 February 2024	0.449
Episode 8	Jan Prušinovský, Tomáš Holeček	26 February 2024	0.467
