= Metoda Markovič: Hojer =

- Genre: Crime
- Written by: Jaroslav Hruška
- Directed by: Pavel Soukup
- Starring: Petr Lněnička; Petr Uhlík
- Country of origin: Czech Republic
- Original language: Czech
- No. of seasons: 1
- No. of episodes: 6

Production
- Producers: Tomáš Hruška; Lukáš Mráček
- Cinematography: Ondřej Belica
- Editor: Tomáš Holocsy
- Running time: 57 Minutes
- Production company: Blue Hills Pictures

Original release
- Network: Voyo
- Release: January 26 – March 1, 2024

Related
- Metoda Markovič: Straka

Metoda Markovič: Hojer (The Markovič Method: Hojer) is a Czech crime television series produced by TV Nova. It is about investigation of murders committed by serial killer Ladislav Hojer which was led by Jiří Markovič who was known for unorthodox investigative methods. Markovič himself collaborated with filmmakers before his death.

== Plot ==
The series is set at turn of 1970s and 1980s. A new, terrifying phenomenon appears on night streets - young sexual rapists with sadistic tendencies. Elite Police investigator Jiří Markovič investigates a brutal murder of a raped woman committed by a sadistic murderer. Markovič and his team arrest a suspect - Ladislav Hojer. Markovič starts to suspect that Hojer is responsible for more murders...

The series chronicles investigation and capture of Ladislav Hojer and his specific relationship with investigator Markovič. Each episode also includes another of Markovič's closed cases. These cases show how Markovič developed a specific investigative method in which he talks to the perpetrators as equals, does not elevate himself above them, does not insult them, tries to understand them, to use their dark sides to his advantage. Thus the legend Markovič was born.

== Cast ==
- Petr Lněnička as mjr.Jiří Markovič, elite police investigator and protagonist of the series. He does not see his work as a fight against evil. He understands that there is simply a certain dark side to life.
- Petr Uhlík as Ladislav Hojer, dangerous serial killer and main antagonist of the series.
- Václav Neužil as kpt. Josef Vilímek, Markovič's colleague and friend. Based on Antonín Jarolímek.
- Adam Mišík as por. Vlasta Červenka, young hot-headed investigator who has much to learn. Based on Lubomír Fiala.
- Dano Heriban as JUDr. Štefan Žabimajerský, defense attorney
- Michal Isteník as MUDr. Petr Řemen, sexuologist and psychiatrist who is Markovič's friend.
- Sarah Haváčová as Eva Markovičová, Markovič's wife.
- David Prachař as plk. Jaroslav Houlík, chief of murder department
- Sára Rychlíková as nstržm. Irena Marečková, secretary at murder department.
- Vojtěch Kotek as Jaromír Stahlwerk, murderer whom Markovič visits to discuss the case. He is inspired by Vladimír Tekverk.
- Cyril Dobrý as Jiří Prchlík (based on Jan Tvrdík)
- Alena Doláková as Marie Prchlíková
- Lenka Krobotová as Jiřina Radlická
- Roman Skamene as Břetislav Vaněk
- Milan Šteindler as Karel Maršálek
- Filip Březina as Milan Pavel
- Štěpán Dostál as Jindřich Jonáš
- Filip Štancl as Miloslav Sokol (based on Antonín Vorel)
- Jakub Albrecht as Vilém Liška
- Jan Grundman as Robert Smrk (based on Jaroslav Zmek)

== Production ==
Nova was originally producing the series under name Hojer. Markovič was helping with screenwriting during 2022. Shooting occurred during 2023. It was also filmed in Slaný where filmmakers were shooting scenes that showed story of medicine student Ivona S. who became Hojer's second victim.

== Episodes ==
Episode		Directed by	Written by	Original air date (Voyo)	Original air date (Nova)	Czech viewers (millions)
1	Možnost léčby	Pavel Soukup	Jaroslav Hruška	26 January 2024	7 September 2025	1.107
2	Ženská oběť	Pavel Soukup	Jaroslav Hruška	2 February 2024	14 September 2025	
3	Poslední facka	Pavel Soukup	Jaroslav Hruška	9 February 2024	21 September 2025	
4	Rodinná záležitost	Pavel Soukup	Jaroslav Hruška	16 February 2024	28 September 2025	
5	Chyba systému	Pavel Soukup	Jaroslav Hruška	23 February 2024	5 October 2025	
6	Cesta ke světlu	Pavel Soukup	Jaroslav Hruška	1 March 2024	12 October 2025	

== Reception ==
Metoda Markovič: Hojer has won the award for the Best series at Serial Killer Festival in 2023 becoming the first Czech series to win the award. Jury praised sensitive direction and cinematography together with an impressively constructed period atmosphere of the story.

The series received very positive reception from audience resulting in strong score on Czech and Slovak Movie Database (ČSFD). On 2 March 2024 it had 88% audience score. Petr Lněnička and Petr Uhlík were particularly praised for their performances.

Markovič's wife Eva praised the series for its realism. She stated that watching the series was an emotionally strong experience as it showed situations she went through herself. She also liked performance of Sarah Haváčová who played her. She also highly praised Petr Lněnička's performance stating that she sometimes felt like she sees her husband on the screen.

== Future ==
TV Nova announced prior broadcast of the series that it works on a second series with working title Straka which focuses on investigation of murders committed by another serial killer Jiří Straka. Server serial zone lists the series under title Metoda Markovič: Případ Straka (The Markovič Method: Straka Case). According to Jan Barvíř of Nafilmu the series will be titled Metoda Markovič: Straka (The Markovič Method: Straka). On 4 April 2024 the series was officially announced as Metoda Markovič: Straka.

Writer of series Jaroslav Hruška stated in an interview for Express FM that he plans to make two additional series of The Markovič Method after Straka. The series would show work of the police at the turn of the 80s and 90s. He noted that interest of audience is to decide whether these series will be filmed.
