= Jaroslav Veis =

Czech journalist and science fiction writer

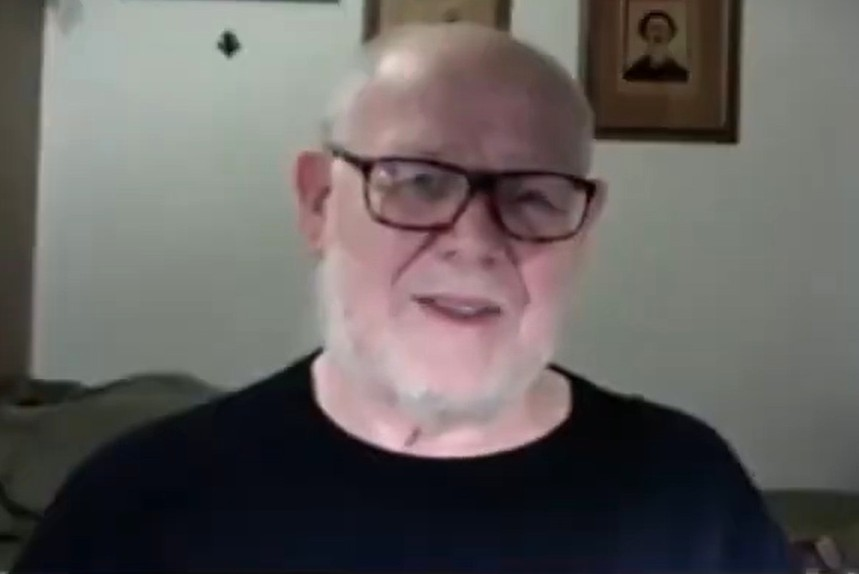
Veis speaks at UCLA Library R.U.R. centennial in 2021.

Jaroslav Veis (born April 19, 1946, in Prague) is a Czech journalist and science fiction writer. He edited Lidové noviny from 1991 to 1992. In science fiction his collection Pandořina skříňka (Pandora's Box) was widely admired.
