= Karel Smyczek =

Czech actor and director

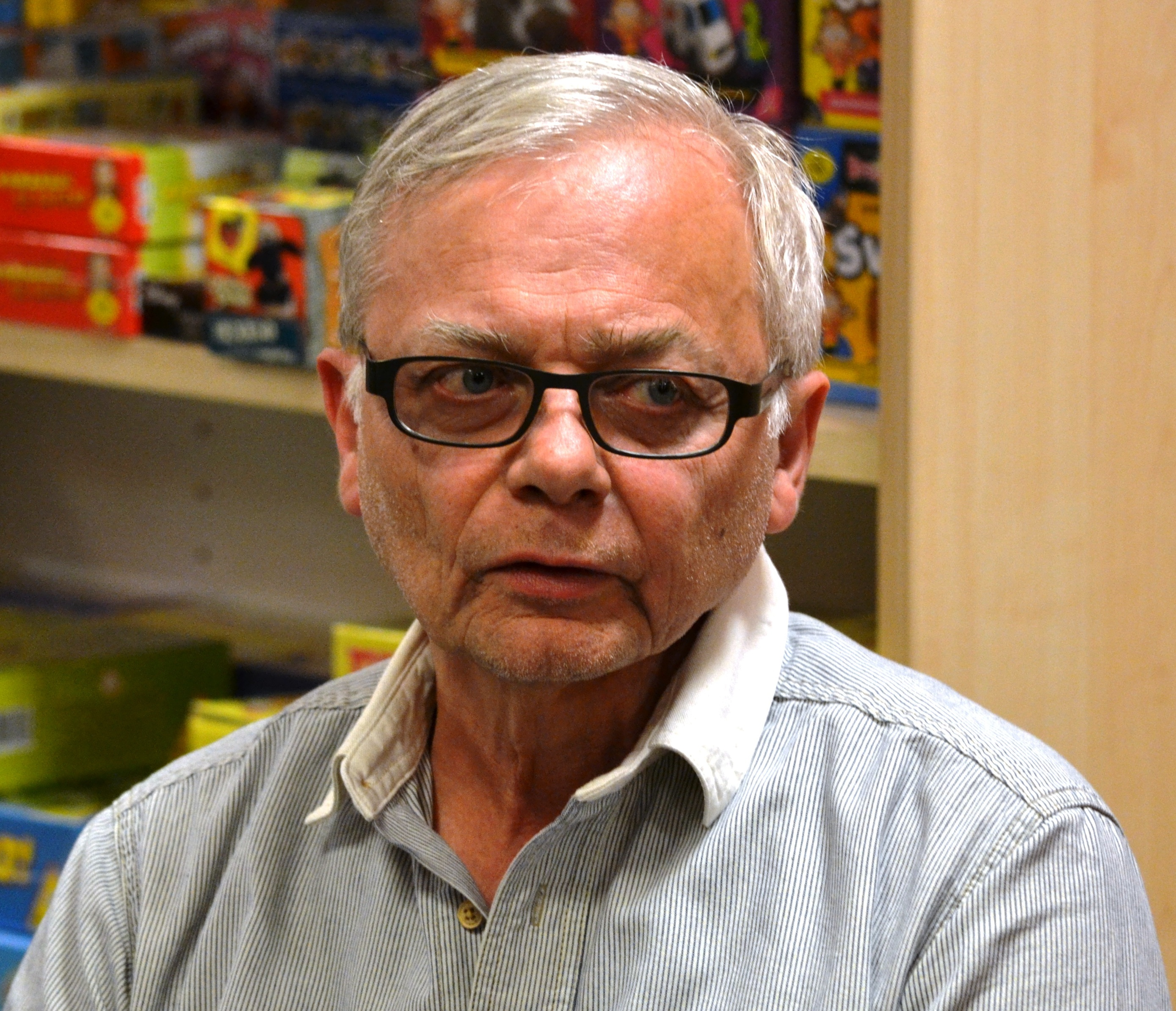
- Karel Smyczek (2013)
- Born: 31 March 1950 (age 76); Slaný, Czechoslovakia
- Occupations: Film director, actor, screenwriter
- Years active: 1960–present

Karel Smyczek (born 31 March 1950) (Czech pronunciation: [ˈkarɛl ˈsmɪtʃɛk]) is a Czech film director, actor and screenwriter. His film Why? was screened in the Un Certain Regard section at the 1988 Cannes Film Festival.

On 22 January 2025, the Czech Film and Television Academy announced, that he would be awarded the Czech Lion Award for Unique Contribution to Czech Film, together with Czech film music conductor Mario Klemens.

== Selected filmography ==
Director
Year	Film	Notes
1980	Housata	
1983	Sněženky a machři	
1987	Krajina s nábytkem	
1987	Why?	Golden Kingfisher - Plzeň Film Festival
1987	Záhada zlatého servisu	
1992	Kocourkov	
1994	Bylo nás pět	
1997	Srdeční slabosti	
1997	Lotrando a Zubejda	Award of the City of Zlín - Zlín International Film Festival for Children and Youth
1998	Poklad pana H.	
1998	Vše pro firmu	

Actor
Year	Film	Role	Notes
1960	Zlé pondělí	Pavel Vítovec	
1960	Holubice	Michal	
1962	Pohádka o staré tramvaji	Chemist	
1964	Láska nebeská	Jirka	
1976	Den pro mou lásku	Customer in gallery	
1985	Co je vám, doktore?	Specialist	
1987	Why?	Reporter	
1988	Útěk ze seriálu		
1997	Lotrando a Zubejda	Wanderer	

Writer
Year	Film	Notes
1987	Why?	story
1994	Bylo nás pět	screenplay
1997	Lotrando a Zubejda	technical screenplay
1998	Vše pro firmu	co-screenplay
