= Kovy =

Czech YouTuber

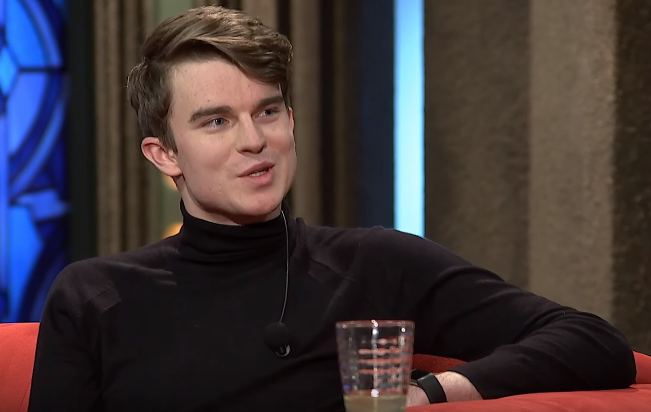
- Kovy in 2018
- Born: Karel Kovář; 11 September 1996; Pardubice, Czech Republic
- Education: Charles University (left)
- Years active: 2012–present

YouTube information
- Channel: TadyKovy
- Years active: 2012–present
- Subscribers: 1 million
- Views: 267 million
- Last updated: 25 June 2025
- Website: gameball.cz

Karel Kovář (born 11 September 1996), commonly known as Kovy (Czech pronunciation: ['kovɪ]), is a Czech YouTube personality, vlogger, and former let's player. He started his YouTube career in 2012 at the age of 16 with his first channel Gameballcz, focused mainly on let's plays and parodies. In 2014, Kovář founded a new channel called Kovy (his own nickname), focused on vlogging and infotainment videos. He became known for his originality and difference from other Czech YouTubers.

== Biography ==
Kovář was born and raised in Pardubice, Czech Republic. In 2016, he took a matura exam consisting of history and social science and moved to Prague to attend Faculty of Social Sciences, Charles University to study marketing communications and public relations. Kovář left the university after three semesters to focus on YouTube and other projects.

In 2017, Kovy was chosen as one of three young YouTubers from Europe (together with Abdel El Vrai from Belgium and Diana zur Löwen from Germany) to ask Jean-Claude Juncker four questions of their own choosing. Kovy asked Juncker about European Union–Turkey relations, migration, the costly moving of the European Parliament between Brussels and Strasbourg, and relations between the EU and youth.

Also in 2017, Kovy came out as gay in a YouTube video and in his book Ovšem.
