= Petr Janyška =

Czech journalist & diplomat (born 1953)

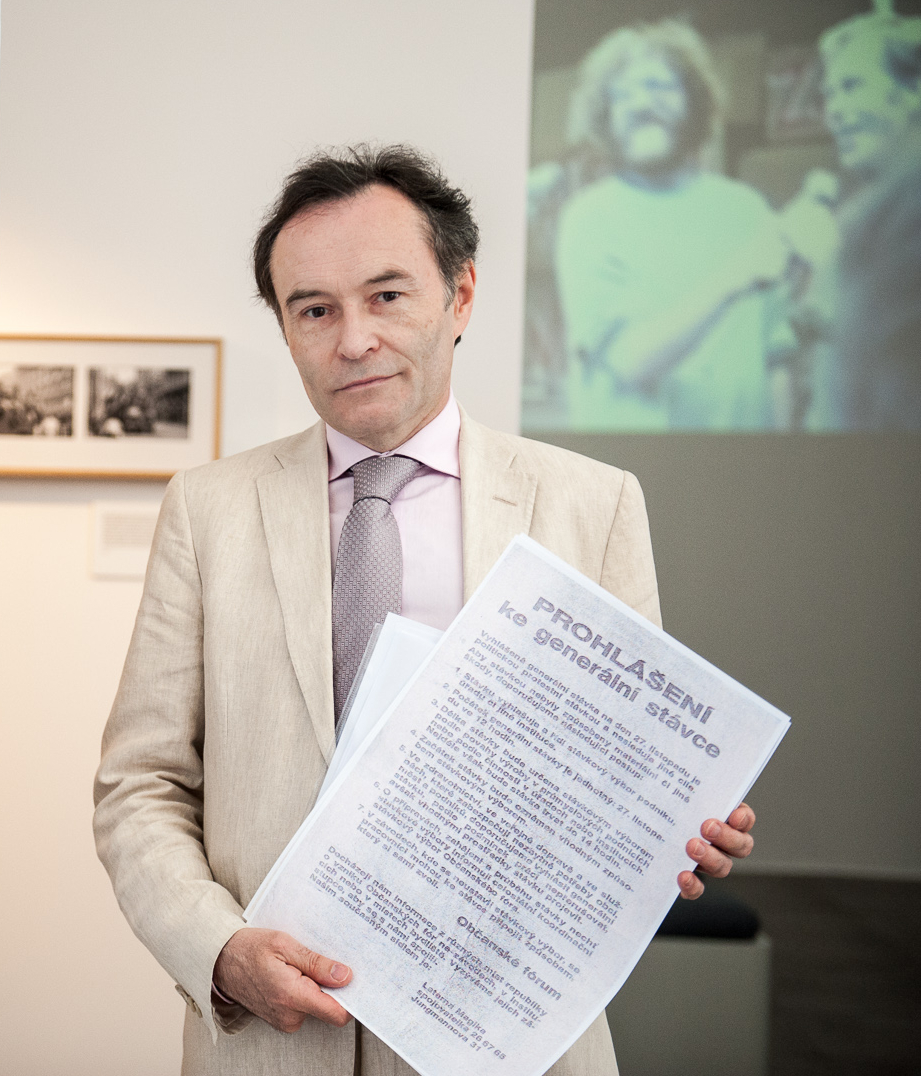
Petr Janyška

Petr Janyška (born in 1953) is a Czech diplomat and translator.

He worked as a translator from English, French and Polish in the communist Czechoslovakia. He also published in Samizdat publications. During the Velvet Revolution of 1989 Petr Janyška belonged to the inner core of the pro-democracy movement Civic Forum. He was a key figure in establishment of independent media in the post-communist era. He was a deputy editor-in-chief of Respekt and Lidové noviny. Since 1995 he has been working in diplomacy, as an Ambassador to France, actively lobbying for Czech accession to European Union. He has also been lecturing at the Charles University in Prague. In 2012 he became head of the Czech Centre in Warsaw.
