= I'm Not Everything I Want to Be =

- Promotional release poster
- Czech: Ještě nejsem, kým chci být
- Directed by: Klára Tasovská
- Screenplay by: Alexander Kashcheev; Klára Tasovská
- Produced by: Lukáš Kokeš; Klára Tasovská; Ralph Wieser; Jakub Viktorín
- Starring: Libuše Jarcovjáková
- Cinematography: Libuše Jarcovjáková
- Edited by: Alexander Kashcheev
- Music by: Prokop Korb; Adam Matej; Oliver Torr
- Production companies: Mischief Films; Nutprodukcia; Somatic Films; Somatic Films; Česká televize ARTE GEIE
- Release date: 18 February 2024 (Berlinale)
- Running time: 90 minutes
- Countries: Czech Republic; Slovakia; Austria
- Language: Czech
- Box office: US$20,894

I'm Not Everything I Want to Be (Czech: Ještě nejsem, kým chci být) is a 2024 documentary film co-written, co-produced and directed by Klára Tasovská. The film is a portrait of the life and career of Czech photographer Libuše Jarcovjáková, who was noted for her photography of the underground LGBTQ scene in Prague prior to the decriminalization of same-sex relationships in the country.

The film premiered in February 2024 at the 74th Berlin International Film Festival. It was later screened in the International Competition at the 2024 Festival du nouveau cinéma, where it won both the Daniel Langlois Innovation Award and the Prix Fierté Montréal for best LGBTQ-related film in the festival program. The film also won the audience award and the Pass Culture jury prize in Écrans mixtes, LGBTQ+ festival of Lyon in 2025.

It was selected as the Czech entry for the Best International Feature Film at the 98th Academy Awards, but it was not nominated.

== Synopsis ==
The documentary follows Czech photographer Libuše Jarcovjáková through several decades of her life and career. Using her personal photographs, diaries, and narration, the film recounts her experiences in Czechoslovakia during the period of normalization, where she documents factory workers, nightlife, marginalized communities, and her own private life.

As Jarcovjáková becomes involved in Prague’s underground cultural scene, she also records the city’s gay community and explores her personal relationships and identity. Facing political and social restrictions, she eventually leaves Czechoslovakia and moves to West Berlin. Her attempts to establish herself abroad are followed by a period in Tokyo, where she works in fashion photography.

The film continues through her later return to Europe and the political changes surrounding the end of communist rule in Czechoslovakia. Across these stages of her life, Jarcovjáková repeatedly turns the camera on herself and those around her. The documentary presents her photographic archive as both a record of changing societies and an account of her continuing search for artistic independence and personal freedom.

== Reception ==
On review aggregator website Rotten Tomatoes, the film holds an approval rating of 100% based on 12 reviews.

== See also ==
- List of Czech submissions for the Academy Award for Best International Feature Film
- List of submissions to the 98th Academy Awards for Best International Feature Film
