= Jan Petránek =

Czech journalist, commentator and dissident

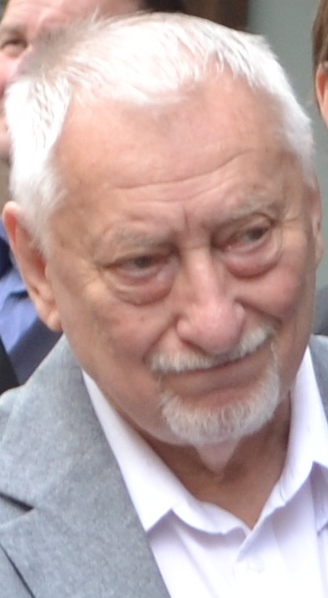
Jan Petránek in 2013

Jan Petránek (28 December 1931, Prague – 10 November 2018, Prague) was a Czech journalist, commentator and dissident during the communist era of Czechoslovakia. He was a signatory of Charter 77.

== Biography ==
Petránek was a journalist for Czech Radio, the public radio broadcaster, at the time of the Prague Spring and the Warsaw Pact invasion of Czechoslovakia in 1968. He was fired by Czech Radio's management shortly after the invasion, but resumed underground, independent broadcasts during the country's Normalization period.

In the late 1980s, Petránek also became involved with the samizdat publication of the Lidové noviny newspaper, which had been banned by the Communist government since the 1950s.

Petránek became the editor of the Lidové noviny once the newspaper was legalized following the Velvet Revolution. He was also rehired by Czech Radio after the fall of communism in 1989.

In 2015, President of the Czech Republic Miloš Zeman awarded Petránek the Medal of Merit.

Petránek died in Prague on 10 November 2018, at the age of 86.
