= Year of the Widow =

- Directed by: Veronika Lišková
- Based on: "Rok vdovy" and "Rok vdovy II" by Zuzana Pokorná
- Starring: Pavla Beretová
- Distributed by: Cinemart
- Release date: 10 October 2024
- Running time: 108 minutes
- Countries: Czech Republic; Slovakia; Croatia
- Language: Czech

Year of the Widow (Czech: Rok vdovy) is a 2024 drama film directed by Veronika Lišková. The plot is based on Zuzana Pokorná's articles of the same name, which were published in the weekly magazine Respekt in 2014 and 2016, in which Pokorná described her emotions and the bureaucratic procedures she had to go through after losing her husband.

The film was screened at the Warsaw Film Festival.

== Plot ==
Interpreter Petra has to come to terms with the fact that she has become a widow at the age of forty. She soon discovers that grief is not the only challenge she has to face as she must deal with worries about her about her teenage daughter, pressure from manipulative mother-in-law and with bureaucratic machinery that comes to life with a person's death: mortgages, loans, rents, fees, endless inheritance proceedings.

== Cast ==
- Pavla Beretová as Petra
- Julie Šoucová as daughter
- Zuzana Kronerová as mother-in-law
- Tomáš Bambušek
- Lucie Žáčková

== Production ==
The film was shot from July to December 2023. Filming took place, for example, at the exhibition center in Louny, at the Masaryk Hospital in Ústí nad Labem, and in Bílina.
