= Czech Lion Award for Best Stage Design =

Czech film award

- Country: Czech Republic
- First award: 1993
- Currently held by: Henrich Boráros
- Website: www.filmovaakademie.cz

Czech Lion Award for Best Stage Design is award given to the Czech film with best Stage Design.

== Winners ==
Year	English Name	Original Name	Stage Designer
2013	Burning Bush	Hořící keř	Milan Býček
2014	Three Brothers	Tři bratři	Jan Vlasák
2015	The Seven Ravens	Sedmero krkavců	Ondřej Mašek, Peter Čanecký
2016	A Prominent Patient	Masaryk	Milan Býček
2017	Laika	Lajka	Aurel Klimt, Martin Velíšek, František Lipták
2018	Insects	Hmyz	Jan Švankmajer
2019	The Painted Bird	Nabarvené ptáče	Jan Vlasák
2020	Maria Theresa - A Woman at War	Marie Terezie II	Martin Kurel
2021	Zátopek	Zátopek	Jan Vlasák
2022	Il Boemo	Il Boemo	Irena Hradecká, Luca Servino
2023	Restore Point	Bod obnovy	Ondřej Lipenský
2024	Girl America	Amerikánka	Jan Kadlec
2025	Franz	Franz	Henrich Boráros
