= Why? (film) =

1987 film

- Directed by: Karel Smyczek
- Written by: Radek John
- Starring: Jiří Langmajer
- Cinematography: Jaroslav Brabec
- Edited by: Ján Svoboda
- Release date: 1 October 1987
- Running time: 86 minutes
- Country: Czechoslovakia
- Language: Czech

Why? (Czech: Proč?) is a 1987 Czechoslovak drama film directed by Karel Smyczek. It was screened in the Un Certain Regard section at the 1988 Cannes Film Festival.

The film deals with the hooliganism in Czechoslovakia, particularly with the fans of football club Sparta from Prague, whose supporters were the pioneers of the football fan riots in Czechoslovakia, starting with hooligan actions already in the 1960s, like breaking the trains in which they travelled when they went on Sparta's away games. The film deals with one of such episodes.

== Cast ==
- Jiří Langmajer as Jirka
- Pavlína Mourková as Marie
- Marketa Zmozkova as Anca
- Pavel Zvaric as Petr
- Martin Dejdar as Sury
- Jan Potměšil as Milan
- Daniel Landa as Pavel
- Miloslav Stibich as Train Passenger
- Miloš Kohout as Football Manager
- Michal Suchánek as Drunken Football Fan
- Jan Kraus as Football Fan
- Roman Holý as Football Fan
- Petr Vachler as Football Fan
- Antonín Jedlička as Man In A Car
- Karel Smyczek as Reporter

== Production ==
When sixteen years old Marketa Zmozkova won the audition, she and her parents were happy. However, when they saw the script included a rough sex scene, the smile on everyone's faces quickly disappeared. "Mr. Smyzcek and Mr. John had to come to our house and explain to Mom that it wouldn't be as awful as it looked on paper," Zmozkova said.
