= March to May =

- Directed by: Martin Pavol Repka
- Written by: Martin Pavol Repka
- Starring: Zuzana Fialová
- Distributed by: Perfilm
- Release date: 28 November 2024
- Running time: 85 minutes
- Country: Czech Republic
- Language: Czech

March to May (Czech: Od marca do mája) is a 2024 Czech film directed by Martin Pavol Repka. Intimate story was written by director Martin Pavel Repka. The film was cast by non-actors and lesser-known actors. The director was inspired, among other things, by work of Italian director Ermann Olmi.

== Plot ==
The film focuses on life of a family in which mutual relationships are manifested by inconspicuous expressions, consideration, tenderness and patience.

== Cast ==
- Zuzana Fialová as Romana
- Jozef Abafi as Romana's husband
- Natália Fašánková as Míša
- Jana Markovičová as Alžběta
- Damián Humaj as Eliáš

== Reception ==
Critics have praised the film for its unpretentious portrait of the life of a family and its small, yet important, expressions of human reciprocity and consideration. The film won the Special Mention of the Jury in the Proxima Competition at the 2024 Karlovy Vary International Film Festival.
