= Ladislav Hojer =

Czech serial killer, rapist and cannibal

- Born: 15 March 1958; Czechoslovakia
- Died: 7 August 1986 (aged 28); Pankrác Prison, Prague, Czechoslovakia
- Cause of death: Execution by hanging
- Status: Executed
- Conviction: Murder with aggravating circumstances
- Penalty: Death

Details
- Victims: 5–7+
- Span of crimes: 1978–1981
- Country: Czechoslovakia
- Date apprehended: 11 February 1982

Ladislav Hojer (15 March 1958 – 7 August 1986) was a Czech sadistic rapist, necrophile, serial killer and cannibal who murdered five women in Czechoslovakia between 1978 and 1981.

== Biography ==
After completing a special school, he was trained by a glazier. His IQ was determined as 88, a below-average score. Shortly before his capture, he lived in an apartment by himself because his brother had taken up military service. He was arrested on 11 February 1982, in connection with an investigation into the murder of Anna Š., committed at the beginning of October 1981. During the subsequent investigation, he indicated the existence of other victims, gradually admitting to another four murders, eighteen rapes and an attempted murder.

Hojer's father died of cancer when he was young. His mother soon remarried, but she soon died of cancer as well. His inexperienced stepfather soon moved away, leaving Hojer alone with his brother Jaroslav in an apartment in Motol.

== Murders ==
=== Eva R. (29) ===
On 1 December 1978 in Děčín he engaged in his first necrophilic act.

This is where he said he "knew the beauty of [his] country, but also looked for some women". He had been planning to visit Děčín since he was passing by bus on his way to Germany. He attacked Eva R. on Elbe's embankment after he left the cinema, knocked her down, dragged her into some bushes and then strangled her. Hojer then proceeded to masturbate over the corpse. On the day of Eva R's murder, she left her husband to visit the cinema, intending to later visit a lover at the crime scene. But the man forgot about the last meeting, and suspicion fell on both men. During the investigation, other lovers were found, including one who was wrongly accused of the killing. As in several of the following cases, a man admitted to the murder for attention.

=== Ivona S. (25) ===
On 9 February 1980, murdered and engaged in necrophilic acts.

On the night train R770 from Prague to Děčín. This medical student sat on their train with her husband, a military officer, but got off near their final destination. The man travelled by another train later. At that time, Hojer himself was in military service and was going to Děčín to visit a friend. He observed Ivona S. as she boarded the train. As she walked out of the toilet cubicle, he walked behind the woman and strangled her using her own scarf. There was not enough space in the cubicle to store the body, therefore Hojer masturbated for a short while before proceeding to throw Ivona's body from a window. He disembarked at a station in Ústí nad Labem and in about two hours returned to Prague with another train. Ivona S.'s body was eventually found around 8 o'clock in the morning by the ČSD cleaning service. A witness in Ústí had spotted a soldier who was in a hurry but could not describe him in detail. Since the other 46 passengers were identified, this soldier became the main suspect. Hojer had an alibi, as his disappearance was not recorded on the day of the murder. The investigation was then accompanied by several coincidences: one of the suspects, a railroad worker, committed suicide. In his apartment, there were newspaper clippings about the case and an English-written medical book, though the man did not know English himself. He had also told colleagues that he hoped the authorities close the investigation. Another suspect was a distant relative of the victim, who, although almost ignorant of the case, broke down while attending her funeral and also committed suicide. The lost plastic bag which was with Ivona's clothes was never found. At the time, this was a highly mysterious case.

=== Unknown (25–35) ===
In August 1980, failed rape resulted in murder.

He decided again during his military holiday to see a friend, this time in Košice. He decided to see the Ružín reservoir dam, which was a sought-after recreation site. Due to bad weather, however, the place was abandoned, except for a lonely woman on the shore who was observing the dam. Unlike his other attacks, Hojer did not even call out to the woman, but the victim fought back. But when she was strangled, he prematurely ejaculated and lost interest. Her body was tied up with some found wire, weighted with a stone and thrown into the water. After the act, the tank was flooded. The body was discovered by workers on 11 October 1981, already at a considerable stage of decay (the head and wrists were non-violently separated from the body). According to the clothing brand Triola, she was a Czechoslovak national aged between 25 and 35 years of age. It was determined that the woman hadn't had any surgeries performed or any major injuries, which prevented the use of medical records to identify her. Due to the inability of Slovak investigators to find out more information, the woman's identity remains unknown.

=== Ivana M. (18) ===
On 30 January 1981, he engaged in necrophilic acts, murder, and cannibalism.

By about 3 o'clock in the morning, he came across the attractive Ivana M. at a tram stop, as she was returning from a local zoo in Brno. He tried to talk to her, but Ivana ran away. Hojer shoved her to the ground and dragged her to the local park, where he tried to rape her, but then proceeded to stab and finally strangle the woman. He then cut off her breasts and genitalia with a scissor blade, which he took home in a plastic bag. He placed the breasts on the tabletop, penetrated his penis into the genitalia that he had cut off beforehand and then put the remains in a refrigerator. After about a week, he cooked them in salted water and tried to eat some of the "devilish" mustard and horse radish. But the dish did not taste good, so he flushed the remains down the toilet. The victim had suffered 39 stab wounds and her wallet, jewellery and watch were stolen. The first suspects were part of the large Greek community that Ivana often met up with. Later on, a Jordanian student admitted to the murder before he attempted to commit suicide. In the subsequent interrogation, he said he had admitted to the gruesome killing in order to divert attention from his academic failures, thus heavily damaging the reputation of his family.

=== Anna Š. (51) ===
On 3 October 1981, he raped and murdered his final victim.

At 10 p.m. near the victim's residence near the bridge over Motolský Potok in Prague 5, Hojer wandered around the premises for at least an hour before he passed by 51-year-old Anna Š., who was returning from an evening concert. Because of her good looks, he considered her younger and tried to persuade Anna to have sex. The conversation was limited to four sentences after the woman had her dress and stockings slit with a knife before being raped. Finally, Hojer pulled her stockings over her head and strangled Anna Š. so she couldn't identify him. He then threw her overcoat over her head so nobody except the killer and the investigators would know the cause of death. Her cry was heard by a large number of witnesses, but nobody connected it with a violent sexual assault. The body was discovered by a random passer-by who wanted to relieve himself in the bushes. This is the only murder that worried Hojer, as he then proceeded to walk 300 meters from his residence and went to work at his job at the glassblowing workshop. He was afraid that people would notice something and discover the killer. He even admitted to the murder several times in his favourite pub, but nobody took him seriously.

== Failed murder ==
Attempted murder – Only by a lucky coincidence a young girl, sitting drunk at a curb next to a tram stop, survived an attack by Hojer. He dragged her into a nearby park, where he stripped the girl and tried to rape her. However, he had an erection problem and hence forced oral sex on her. He also pushed various objects into her vagina and asked her to put her hand there. The girl had her mouth covered all the time and was pushed by the neck, losing consciousness several times. The girl eventually managed to persuade Hojer to continue at her home, where no one would disturb them. She asked him to dress her up because she could not go naked on the street. So he let her go and put her clothes back on, but the girl pushed him away and ran down the street. Hojer caught and then knocked her on the ground, before proceeding to hit her head on the pavement several times. Her shouting was heard by a policeman, who leaned out of his apartment window and shouted "You will leave her!" at the assailant. The would-be killer mocked the wounded girl and then fled.

== Investigation, conviction and execution ==
He was arrested based on the testimony of a mentally ill patient who admitted to the murder of Anna Š., but the investigation later revealed that he had been securely behind bars the entire time. But the man knew how she was murdered, which was still unpublished information. Finally, the patient told the authorities that his friend showed him the scene of the crime and told him how Anna was killed. That friend was Hojer, who thereafter admitted to the murder. Later, particles of cloth from his trousers were found, along with other things, as well as his blood type coinciding with the saliva and sperm samples secured at the crime scene. Hojer also possessed a knife, which he used to cut up the victims' garments.

During the reconstructions, the live extras had to be replaced with artificial mannequins, because the killer became too absorbed in the visual demonstrations of his crimes and lost self-control.

In 1982, he admitted to another murder, bringing the count to five. Criminologists believe he committed at least two other murders, but he did not admit to them. Hojer confessed exclusively in writing because he was ashamed of some of his deeds and refused to speak with anyone.

For his brutal deeds, he was sentenced to death. He also withdrew his confession once. Although there was a possibility that he had committed other crimes, there was anxiety about confusing the investigators with false accusations, so the investigation was closed. Ladislav Hojer was executed on 7 August 1986 in Pankrác Prison. Before he was punished, he expressed his fear of death, and the execution was delayed twice due to the offender's illness.

== Personality ==
According to expert opinions in psychiatry, sexology and psychology, he was a primitive psychopath: an amoral, anabolic personality with schizoid features and aggressive tendencies. Criminal behaviour was committed in uninterrupted consciousness and deliberately made it more difficult to reveal. He was able to hinder and correct his repeated actions. His attitude toward murders is indicative of insensitivity and brutality, the absence of at least additional sympathy, conscience or regret.

The reports showed that:

- mental disorder was not detected,
- resocialization, even a long-term punishment, is not possible,
- protective treatment in a closed psychiatric institution is not proposed.

A clear guideline for explaining Hojer's motives was his exclusively negative experience with women. He tried to establish the acquaintance by using an ad. A well-dressed woman arrived at the meeting, promising to get acquainted with a financially secure middle-aged man. Hojer repulsed her with his appearance, repulsed, and reproached so hard that she left after a few minutes. It was much more promising for Hojer to become acquainted with the young woman he met at a party with his friends. She offered him sexual intercourse in the next room. Hojer's panic has likely fallen as the woman has become active and moved away. He tossed it so hard that the door's glass filled through, and ran away from the apartment. Later, he learned that this girl, with a very bad reputation, spoke to his acquaintances with him. He was always very vulgar and contemptuous about women, but he was rather passive and uncertain in their presence. He did not know how to communicate with women, and he often imagined the scenes in which the helpless girl prayed for mercy.

During the investigations and in particular reconstructions, Hojer built a special and almost friendly relationship with the criminalists. Chief Investigator Jiří Markovič even wanted to invite him to his home for a Sunday lunch. This idea was eventually summoned by his colleagues. When the Slovak murder was clarified, there was no company available, so Markovič had to play Hojer's game. Reconstructions were often very problematic because they were too much in the situation, and therefore the actors were instead replaced by mannequins. In some reconstructions, the investigators met the threats of visiting citizens who demanded Hojer's release and lynching. Hojer did not understand their reaction, which clearly testified to his inability to understand the seriousness of his crimes.

Another distinctive feature of Hojer's personality was a very dark sense of humour. One day, for example, he offered criminalists in the car that if he stopped at two hitchhikers who were passing by, he would "sniff and kill" them so they could have a quick case. His primitive way of expression was remarkable. He used turns like "I took her oxygen; I caught her by the mouth; she remained in my hands; I did not care what drunk, especially that she had a good skeleton ", etc. He said rhythm as his motto: "When my tail stands, my brain stops." He did not admit the imminent death penalty until the last moment and even enjoyed his stay in custody. It was the first time in his life he became the focus of one's interest.

== In popular culture ==
Hojer is portrayed by Petr Uhlík in the television series Metoda Markovič: Hojer.

== See also ==
- List of incidents of cannibalism
- List of serial killers by country
