= Dcera národa =

- Genre: Historical Romantic series
- Directed by: Cristina Groșan; Matěj Chlupáček
- Starring: Antonie Formanová
- Country of origin: Czech Republic
- Original language: Czech
- No. of seasons: 1
- No. of episodes: 6

Production
- Running time: 30 minutes

Original release
- Network: Canal+ Czech Republic; Czech Television
- Release: 29 September 2024

Dcera národa (Daughter of the Nation) is a Czech romantic historical series. It is a coproduction between Canal+ Czech Republic and Czech Television. It is the first Czech production of Canal+. The series tells story of Zdeňka Havlíčková, daughter of Karel Havlíček Borovský. The series had its gala premiere at the Serial Killer festival on 28 September 2024 and was released one day later on Canal+ before being broadcast by Czech Television.

== Plot ==
Karel Havlíček Borovský dies leaving his daughter Zdeňka an orphan. She is taken care of by Czech revivalists led by František Ladislav Rieger. Revivalists want to make her a perfect symbol of the tenderness of Czech culture but rebellious Zdeňka wants to live her life according to her ideas. When she falls in love with a Polish officer of the Austrian army she turns in public eyes from a girl loved by the crowd literally to a traitor of the nation and a whore. Will Zdeňka manage to assert her romantic love, or will she give in to the pressure and marry a boring landowner from a good Czech family?

== Cast ==
- Antonie Formanová as Zdeňka Havlíčková
- Jiří Langmajer as František Ladislav Rieger
- Jan Vlasák as František Palacký
- Vladimír Javorský as Alois Pravoslav Trojan
- Leoš Noha as František August Brauner
- Robert Mikluš as Josef Hamerník
- Ladislav Hampl as Antonín Svoboda
- Daniel Kadlec as Quido Battaglia
- Martina Jindrová as Filipka Hráská
- Vojtěch Machuta as Václav Robert Kounic

== Episodes ==
No.	Title	Directed by	Written by	Original release date (Canal+)	Original release date (ČT1)	Czech viewers (millions)
1	"Dobročinná loterie"	Matěj Chlupáček	Lucie Vaňková	29 September 2024	8 January 2025	0.411
2	"Konkurz"	Matěj Chlupáček	Lucie Vaňková	29 September 2024	15 January 2025	TBA
3	"Velká láska"	Matěj Chlupáček	Lucie Vaňková	29 September 2024	22 January 2025	TBA
4	"Uniforma"	Cristina Groșan	Lucie Vaňková	29 September 2024	29 January 2025	TBA
5	"Coura národa"	Cristina Groșan	Lucie Vaňková	29 September 2024	5 February 2025	TBA
6	"A žili šťastně až na věky"	Cristina Groșan	Lucie Vaňková	29 September 2024	12 February 2025	TBA
