= Our Lovely Pig Slaughter =

- Theatrical release poster
- Directed by: Adam Martinec
- Written by: Adam Martinec
- Produced by: Matěj Paclík
- Starring: Karel Martinec; Miloslav Čížek; Pavlína Balner; Aleš Bílík; Albert Čuba
- Distributed by: Cinemart
- Release dates: 30 July 2024 (KVIFF); 8 August 2024 (Czechia)
- Running time: 85 minutes
- Countries: Czech Republic; Slovakia
- Language: Czech

Our Lovely Pig Slaughter (Czech: Mord, literally Murder) is a 2024 Czech-Slovak tragicomedy film written and directed by Adam Martinec in his directorial debut. The film is a study of Czech nature. According to the director, the film is about different forms and dangers of loneliness, about the fact that not every conversation is conducted with the right words, how little people really listen to each other, or how little they value themselves for standing up for themselves. The film premiered at 58th Karlovy Vary International Film Festival where it received Special Award.

The story is accompanied by sharp humor and the visceral rendering of the characters, which, according to the Karlovy Vary festival where the film competed, is reminiscent of the leading works of the Czechoslovak New Wave.

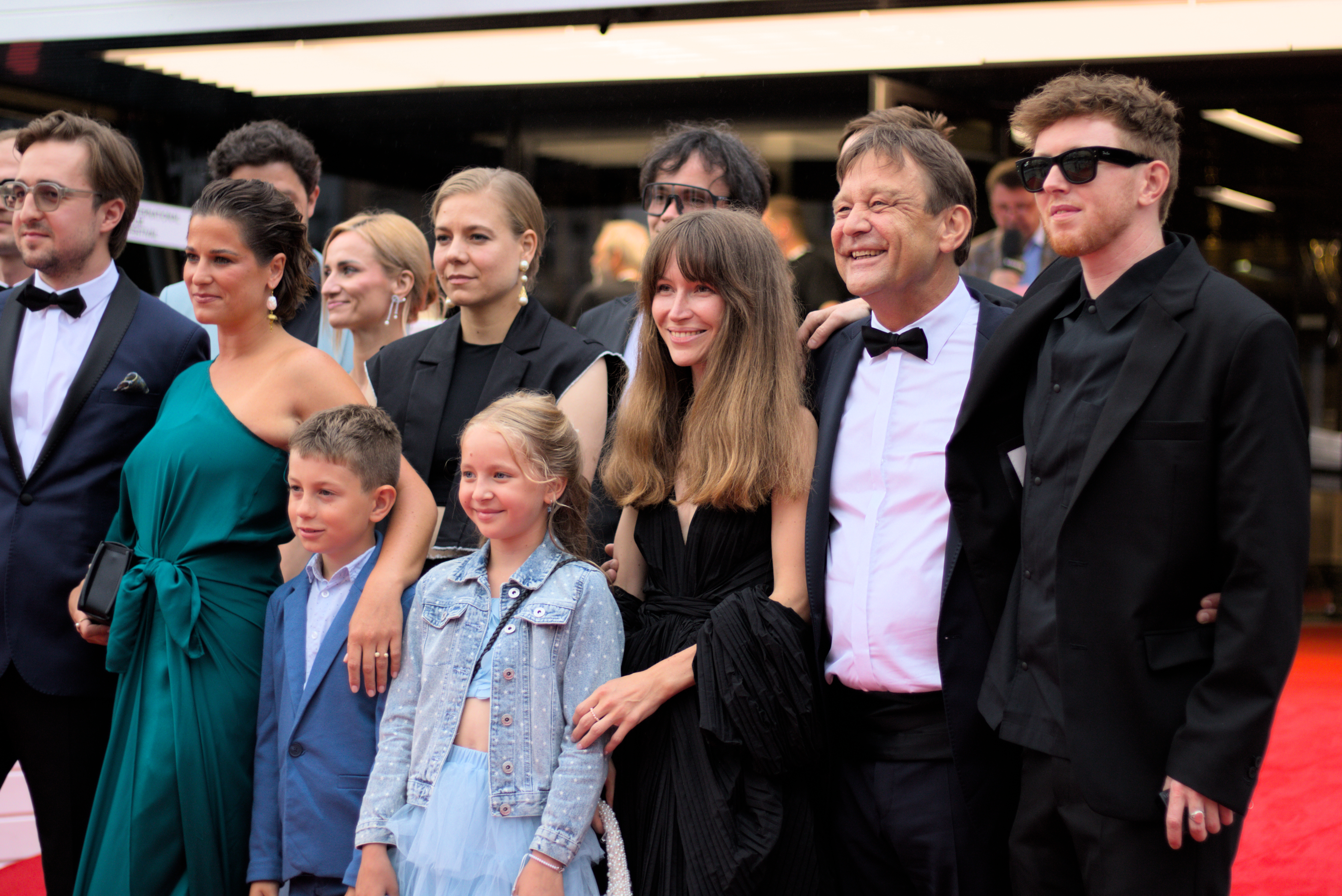

== Plot ==
The story takes place somewhere in the Osoblažsko area, where a family meets for an annual tradition - a pig slaughterhouse. However, this time everything is different than usual.

== Cast ==
- Karel Martinec
- Miloslav Čížek
- Pavlína Balner
- Aleš Bílík
- Albert Čuba
- Karin Bílíková Vápeníčková
- Zdeněk Pecháček

== Production ==
The film is inspired by Adam Martinec's childhood and growing up in the north of Moravia. Based on his own script, Martinec directed his feature directorial debut himself. It was filmed in Krnov, where the director was born, and the story was filled with actors and non-actors including his father and his real neighbors. On the contrary, the slaughterhouse, which is the main theme of the film, did not actually take place during filming and was simulated with the help of pieces of meat from the slaughterhouse in order to protect the animals from stress.

The film was co-produced by Czech Television.
