= The Gardener's Year =

2024 Czech drama film

- Directed by: Jiří Havelka
- Produced by: Pavel Strnad; Petr Oukropec
- Starring: Oldřich Kaiser
- Cinematography: Ferdinand Mazurek
- Music by: Tadeáš Věrčák
- Distributed by: Donart Film
- Release date: 18 July 2024
- Running time: 103 minutes
- Country: Czech Republic
- Language: Czech

The Gardener's Year (Czech: Zahradníkův rok) is a 2024 Czech drama film directed by Jiří Havelka. It is based on real events.

== Plot ==
At the foot of a picturesque hill lives a gardener with his wife. They have their own garden shop. Their life is disrupted by a new owner of a nearby castle. He wants to transform the landscape according to his ideas. When gardening gets in the way of his plans, a series of bizarre events are set in motion. The new owner first builds a fence with razor wire and closes off the driveway. He gradually increases the intensity of his actions to achieve his goals. However, the gardener does not give up and tries to defend his home. When the police and the mayor drown in their own bureaucracy, the gardener decides to take his things into his own hands.

== Cast ==
- Oldřich Kaiser as Gardener
- Dáša Vokatá as Gardener's Wife
- Štěpán Kozub as Security
- Michal Isteník as Reality Agent
- Alena Mihulová as Mayor
- Petr Lněnička as Bureaucrat
- Luboš Veselý as Gardener's Neighbour
- Tomáš Jeřábek as Policeman
- Jiří Vyorálek as Policeman
- Tereza Dočkalová as Journalist
- Hanuš Bor as Medician
- Pavel Batěk as Criminalist
