= Jiří Straka =

Czech serial killer

- Born: 14 April 1969 (age 57); Prague, Czechoslovakia
- Other names: "The Spartakiad Killer"; Jiří Novák
- Convictions: Murder x3 Rape x5 Attempted murder x2 Robbery x3 Theft x5
- Penalty: 10 years imprisonment

Details
- Victims: 3
- Span of crimes: April – May 1985
- Country: Czechoslovakia
- Location: Prague
- Date apprehended: 22 May 1985

Jiří Straka (born 14 April 1969), also known as The Spartakiad Killer, is a Czech serial killer responsible for 11 attacks on women in Prague between February and May 1985, when he was aged 15 and 16, three of which were fatal. As he was a minor when he committed these crimes, he was convicted and sentenced to 10 years imprisonment.

Following his release from prison in 2004, he legally changed his name and now lives in another part of the country.

== Early years ==
Jiří Straka was born on 14 April 1969, in Prague, the second of three children born to a local couple. He had one older sister and one younger brother. According to his parents, Straka never displayed any aggressive behaviour when he was young and was generally considered a good child, albeit slightly more emotional than others. At the age of 8, he was sent for psychiatric treatment, where he was diagnosed with a neurotic disorder. As a teenager, he alternated between going to a boarding school and a mining apprenticeship in nearby Stochov.

In 1985, at a time when the country was celebrating the Spartakiad, Straka began to act out on his sexual urges, stalking women around Prague at nighttime, whom he eventually started to attack.

== Crimes ==
Straka's first known attack took place on 17 February 1985, when he was 15 years old, and he approached 20-year-old Ludmila Ch. in a grove near the Novodvorská housing estate in Prague 4. At first, the pair had a casual conversation, but when Straka asked her for sex and was promptly refused, he knocked her to the ground and began fighting with her. Ludmila then lied to him, claiming that she would agree to have sex with him, but when they went out into the streets, she started shouting for help. Frightened, her assailant only asked for some money and then fled. Unwilling to get him into trouble, the woman decided not to report the incident to the authorities.

The following month, Straka attacked two more victims in Prague 6, hitting one on the head with a cobblestone and stealing her bag, while the other successfully defended herself from him using judo. On 8 April, in the same place where he had his first victim, Straka pounced upon 23-year-old Alice P., who was on her way to visit her boyfriend. He dragged her into some nearby bushes, where he raped her. After finishing with her, he shoved a pair of panties, clay, stones and some dirt into her mouth, as well as a few leaves in her nose, which caused her to suffocate to death. Straka then covered the body with some leaves and left, with the body being discovered on the next day.

On 4 May, in Hloubětín, Straka came across a 54-year-old woman named Vlasta Š., whom he had spotted exiting a tram. He attacked her, believing she was much younger, pressing his fingers and kneeling on her neck before tightening a thread around it, making her fall into unconsciousness. Convinced that she had died, he robbed the woman and left; unbeknownst to him, Vlasta had survived her injuries. Feeling unsatisfied, Straka went looking for another victim, chancing upon a 30-year-old doctor, Věra F. He attacked her as well, slamming her heels on her face until she fainted, whereupon he raped and then strangled her with her bra straps. Like his previous victims, he then robbed her.

Straka committed his last murder just twelve days later, in Dejvice. On that night, he went into a greengrocer's shop, raping and strangling the 30-year-old shopkeeper Martha M. with several tourniquets and a rope which he had bought. After looting her body, he then calmly left.

== Arrest, trial and life in prison ==
Following testimony provided by one of Straka's surviving victims, from whom he had stolen a gold necklace and given it to a girl he was dating, he was arrested by authorities on 22 May 1985. While investigators were initially hesitant to believe that a teenager was able to commit such horrible crimes, Straka confessed to all known crimes and others they didn't know about, adding details that only the perpetrator would have known. During the investigations, Straka cooperated with the proceedings, expressing that he felt no remorse for the crimes and that the only thing he was sorry for was being caught.

Straka was put on trial for three murders, two attempted murders, five rapes, three robberies and five thefts. As he was still a minor, he was ineligible for execution and thus sentenced to 10 years imprisonment. A psychiatric reevaluation determined that Straka suffered from abnormally high sexual urges, in addition to having sadistic tendencies.

As a known sex offender in the prison system, Straka was regularly mistreated by fellow inmates, whose abuse ranged from trying to convince him to hang himself to shoving his genitals in porridge. While he was serving his sentence, a court order declared that he should be chemically castrated.

In May 1994, President Václav Havel provided Straka with amnesty, reducing his sentence by one year. As a result, he was moved from prison to a psychiatric hospital in Opava, where he would remain until his release in 2004. Following said release, he changed his last name to Novák, married his girlfriend (whom he had met in the hospital) on 7 December 2006, and moved to a village near the Polish border, where he now lives a law-abiding lifestyle. Both Straka and his parents have given several interviews on Czech television, with the former talking about his personal experiences in both prison and the hospital, while the latter two expressed their view that it would have been better for the family if their son had been executed.

== In popular culture ==
Straka is portrayed by Maxmilián Kocek in the television series Metoda Markovič: Straka.

== See also ==
- List of youngest killers
- List of serial killers by country
