= Serial Killer (festival) =

SER!AL K!LLER
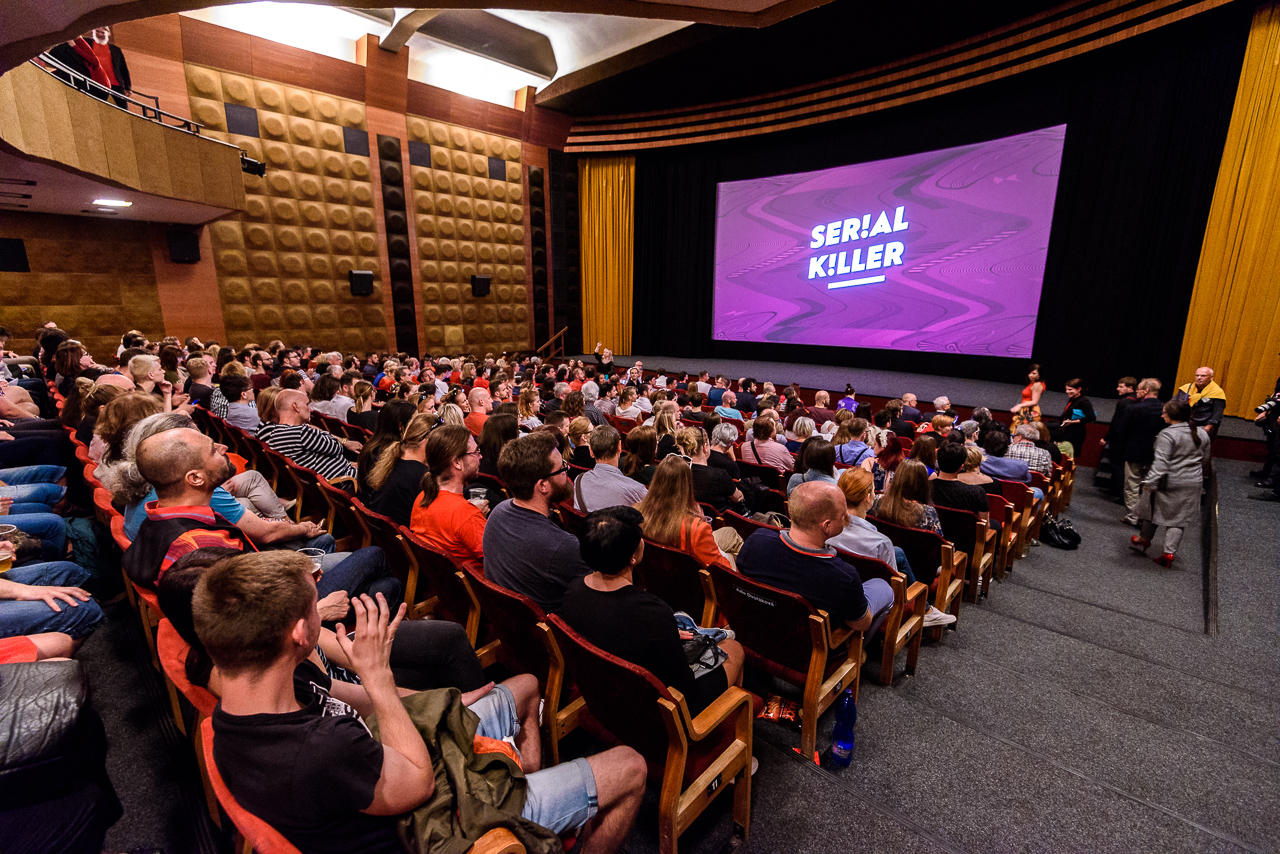
- Screening at the Serial Killer festival
- Location: [ [Brno]], Czech Republic
- Founded: 2018
- Founded by: Kamila Zlatušková
- Festival date: September 23, 2026 – September 28, 2026
- Website: https://www.serialkiller.tv/en

Serial Killer is an international festival of television, streaming, and web series. It is the first event of its kind in Central and Eastern Europe.

The Festival is held annually in Brno, Czech Republic. It aims to offer current and high-quality European series. Most of the screenings, which take place in the cinemas or theaters, consist of the first two episodes of a series. The festival also premiered the #martyisdead web series, which later won the International Emmy Award.

The program of the Festival consists of several sections. In the Main competition section, an international jury announces the Best Central and Eastern European Series. The International panorama section presents series mostly from Western Europe. The Focus section focuses on a series from a different country each year, for example, Denmark, Norway or Great Britain in the past. The Festival also offers industry section TV Days for film and television professionals.

The ninth season of the festival will take place from 23 September to 28 September 2026.

== Festival Editions ==
=== 2018 ===
The festival took place for the first time from 2 to 5 May in 2018 in Scala Cinema, Bolek Polívka Theater and Husa na Provázku Theater in Brno.

Winners of The Best CEE Series:

- Best TV Series: Cuvar Dvorca (Guardian of the Castle) - Croatia
- Special Jury Mention: Pank (The Bank) - Estonia
- Best Web Series: Lajna (The Line) - Czechia

=== 2019 ===
The 2nd edition of Serial Killer took place from 24 to 29 September 2019 in Brno.

Winners of The Best CEE Series:

- Best TV Series: Nenaste (Blackout) - Russia
- Special Jury Mention: Bez vědomí (The Sleepers) - Czechia
- Best Web Series: #martyisdead - Czechia

=== 2020 ===
The 3rd edition of Serial Killer took place in hybrid version from 22 to 27 September 2020. Due to the COVID-19 pandemic, the festival offered the series online for free and the physical event took place with limited capacity for three days in the Husa na Provázku Theater.

Winners of The Best CEE Series:

- Best TV Series: Polet (Six Empty Seats) - Russia
- Special Jury Mention: Reetur (Traitor) - Estonia
- Best Web Series: Terapie Sdílením (Therapy by Sharing) - Czechia

=== 2021 ===
The 4th edition of Serial Killer took place from 21 to 26 September 2021 in Brno.

Winners of The Best CEE Series:

- Best TV Series: Porodica (The Family) - Serbia
- Special Jury Mention: Klára Melíšková for her performance in a leading role in the series Podezření (Suspicion) - Czechia
- Best Web Series: TBH - Czechia

=== 2022 ===
The 5th edition of Serial Killer took place from 20 to 25 September 2022 in Brno.

Winners of The Best CEE Series:

- Best TV Series: Piknik (Picnic) - Ukraine
- Special Jury Mention: Područje bez signala (The Last Socialist Artifact) - Croatia
- Best Web Series: Pět let (Five Years) - Czechia

=== 2023 ===
The 6th edition of Serial Killer took place from 19 to 24 September 2023 in Brno.

Winners of The Best CEE Series:

- Best TV Series: Metoda Markovič: Hojer (The Markovič Method: Hojer) - Czechia
- Best Web Series: Lowbudget - Czechia

=== 2024 ===
Winners of The Best CEE Series:

- Primetime Killer: Operation Sabre (Sablja) – Serbia
- Special Jury Mention: Dcera národa (Daughter of the Nation) – for exceptional set design – Czechia
- Special Jury Mention: I Know Your Soul (Znam kako dišeš) – for a complex script – Bosnia and Herzegovina
- Quick Killer: Processes (Procesy) – Poland & Belarus

=== 2025 ===
Winners of The Best CEE Series:

- Primetime Killer: Monyová – Czechia
- Special Jury Mention: My Dear Mother (Minu kallis ema) – Estonia
- Quick Killer: Kalamaja Blues (second season) – Estonia & Finland
