= Girl America =

2024 Czech drama film

- Theatrical release poster
- Directed by: Viktor Tauš
- Written by: David Jařab
- Distributed by: Bontonfilm
- Release date: 26 September 2024
- Running time: 108 minutes
- Country: Czech Republic
- Language: Czech

Girl America (Czech: Amerikánka) is a 2024 Czech drama film directed Viktor Tauš and written by David Jařab.

== Plot ==
Little Ema Černá grows up without a father, with an older and younger brother. Her alcoholic mother neglects their upbringing, which is why Ema ends up in an orphanage. As a teenager, she temporarily lives with foster parents, but ends up in a reformatory due to her bad behavior. She clings to the hope that her father is waiting for her in America. As an adult, Ema then returns to experiences from her past in an attempt to process and come to terms with them.

== Cast ==
- Pavla Beretová, Julie Šoucová and Klára Kitto as Ema Černá, the "Girl America"
- Lucie Žáčková as Ema's mother
- Klára Melíšková as director orphanage
- Tomas Sean Pšenička as Ema's brother
- Magdaléna Borová
- Vladimír Javorský
- Zuzana Mauréry

== Production ==
The film is based on the true story of Zdena Vrbová who met the film's director Viktor Tauš when he himself was living on the streets and was addicted to heroin. The intensity of her story, after the isolation caused by drugs, rekindled his interest in other people, his desire to understand where Zdena gets her inner strength from after the traumas she had experienced. From that moment on, he knew that he had no business on the streets and that he had to film her story. He also sees it as "the real story of tens of thousands of children who grew up in children's homes in communist Czechoslovakia". He began washing clothes in the Vltava River and looking for work. After three months, he was able to start paying his rent and was no longer homeless. "In a sense, I am only now returning from that street, because I can finally pass on the story that saved my life," said Tauš 25 years after first meeting Vrbová.

Tauš first adapted Zdena Vrbová's story as a theater play, which he revised several times. The main roles were played by Tereza Ramba and Eliška Křenková, and it was performed on the Jatka78 art stage.
