= Antonín J. Liehm =

Czech publicist and writer (1924–2020)

Antonín Jaroslav Liehm
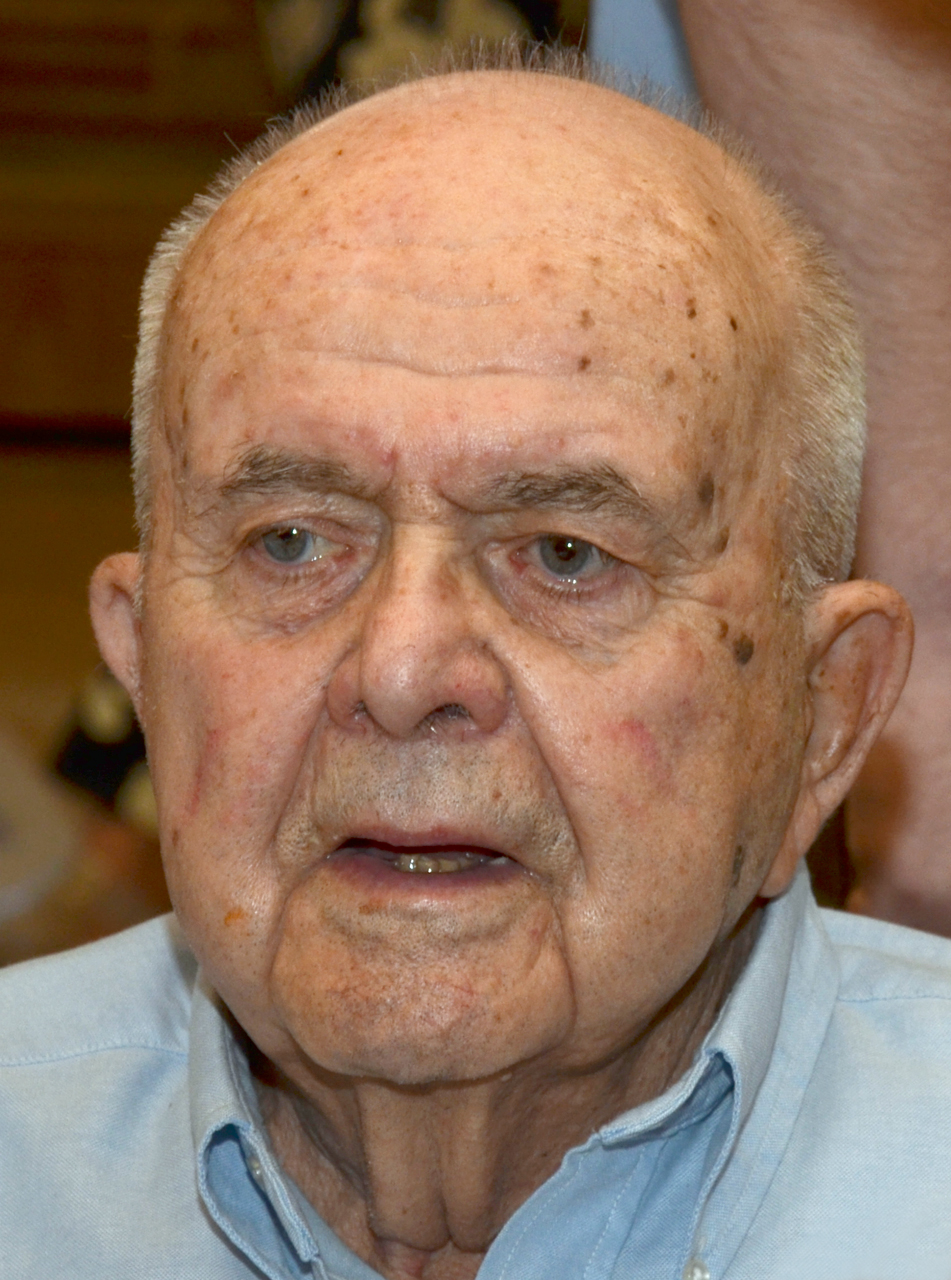
- Born: March 2, 1924; Prague, Czechoslovakia
- Died: December 4, 2020 (aged 96); Prague, Czech Republic
- Education: Vysoká škola politická a sociální
- Occupations: Writer, editor, publisher, translator
- Writing career
- Years active: 1945–2020
- Subjects: European culture, film, politics
- Notable work: Founder of Lettre International

Antonín Jaroslav Liehm (2 March 1924 – 4 December 2020) was a Czech-born writer, publisher, translator, and scholar residing in Paris.

In 1984, Antonín J. Liehm founded the European culture magazine Lettre International. The French version ceased publication in 1993, but some of its many offspring remain in publication. Notably, the German version of the magazine has come out continuously since its foundation in 1988.

== Biography ==
Antonín J. Liehm studied political sciences at Vysoká škola politická a sociální in Prague, graduating in 1949.

=== Kulturní politika ===
In 1945, Liehm, along with Emil František Burian, founded a weekly magazine, titled Kulturní politika (Cultural politics). The magazine was pro-communist and would eventually be taken over and kept in publication by the Czech Writers' Association. Foreign minister Vladimír Clementis offered Liehm a position in the ministry's press department. Clementis was hanged in 1952, after the Stalinist Slánský trial. Subsequently Liehm himself was fired from his position at the ministry and at the magazine. In 1956 Liehm was hired back, then finally let go again in 1960.

=== Literární noviny ===
In 1960, Liehm started work at the literary magazine Literární noviny. Liehm took over as editor in 1960/1961. The magazine's circulation went up to 130,000 copies per issue. Among those working close to Liehm at the time were Ludvík Vaculík, Milan Kundera, Jan Procházka, Pavel Kohout and Ivan Klíma. Publication and further development of the magazine ceased, along with the Prague Spring after the 1968 Warsaw Pact invasion of Czechoslovakia.

=== Emigration and Lettre International ===
In 1969 Liehm emigrated to Paris with his wife Drahomíra N. Liehm. After temporarily accepting a teaching position at Richmond College-CUNY in the USA, Liehm and his wife returned to Paris in 1982, where he held a post at the Paris Diderot University and later at the École des hautes études en sciences sociales. Liehm taught at the University of Pennsylvania from 1979 until 1983. His daughter stated he lived in Paris for 32 years overall while he spent 12 years in the USA, where he obtained US citizenship.

In 1984 Liehm founded the magazine Lettre International, along with writer Paul Noirot. Liehm described the magazine's concept in these words: "If we had a good text, whether German, American, Russian, then we sought out a context for it. Other texts that would surround it, provide commentary, even if they were not written for that purpose at all. […] Our goals was to produce a play of mirrors around a text."

In 2013, he resettled from Paris back to Prague, where he died in 2020 aged 96.

== Bibliography ==
- Louis Aragon, Antonín J. Liehm: Cestující z imperiálu: román. Spisy (Louis Aragon). SNKLU, 1962
- Gespräch an der Moldau. Das Ringen um die Freiheit der Tschechoslowakei, DEA. Molden, München 1968.
- Gespräche an der Moldau. Über humanen Sozialismus. Mit dem Essay von Jean-Paul Sartre "Der Sozialismus, der aus der Kälte kam". Translated from Czech by Erich Bertleff, Kindler, München 1970
- Trois générations: entretiens sur le phénomène culturel tchécoslovaque, from Collection Témoins, Gallimard, 1970
- Josef Škvorecký, Gallimard, 1970
- Antonín J. Liehm, 飯島周: 三つの世代, みすず書房, 1970
- The politics of culture, Grove Press, 1971
- Closely watched films: the Czechoslovak experience, International Arts and Sciences Press, 1974, ISBN 978-0-608-17067-1
- Le Passé présent, J.C. Lattès, 1974
- Antonín J. Liehm, Miloš Forman: The Miloš Forman stories, International Arts and Sciences Press, 1975, ISBN 978-0-87332-051-1
- Antonín J. Liehm, Karel Kosík: Letteratura e dissenso nell'Europa dell'Est. Il Dissenso culturale. La biennale di Venezia, 1977
- Mira Liehm, Antonín J. Liehm: Il Cinema nell'Europa dell'Est, 1960–1977: il cinema di Stato e i suoi artisti. Il Dissenso culturale, La biennale di Venezia, 1977
- Henry Gabay, Antonín J. Liehm: Serghiej Paradjanov: testimonianze e documenti su l'opera e la vita. Il Dissenso culturale. La Biennale di Venezia, 1977
- Nocne rozmowy z Josefem Smrkovskim. Nowa umowa społeczna, Niezależna Oficyna Wydawnicza, 1978
- Josef Smrkovský, Antonín J. Liehm, Jan Teren: Nocne rozmowy z Josefem Smrkovskim: Nowa umowa społeczna / A. J. Liehm, Niezależna Oficyna Wydawnicza, 1978
- Peter Kussi, Antonín J. Liehm: The Writing on the wall: an anthology of contemporary Czech literature, Karz-Cohl Pub., 1983
- Robert Buchar, Antonin J. Liehm: Czech New Wave Filmmakers in Interviews, Mcfarland & Co Inc 2003, ISBN 978-0-7864-1720-9
- Antonín J. Liehm, Aleksandar S. Ilić: Miloš Forman: događaji. From Prilozi za istoriju filma. Institut za film, 1987
- Generace, Index, 1988
- Antonín J. Liehm, Carsten Jensen, Hans Andersen, Jesper Hoffmeyer: Lettre internationale: et nyt Europa?: en ny moral?: et nyt demokrati?. [Anmeldelse], Aarhus Festuge, 1992, ISBN 978-87-7483-285-0
- Ostře sledované filmy: Československá zkušenost, Band 16 von Knihovna Iluminace, Národní Filmový Archiv, 2001, ISBN 978-80-7004-100-0
