= Mira Liehm =

Czech film historian and critic (1929–2019)

- Born: Drahomíra Novotná; 5 December 1929; Prague, Czechoslovakia
- Died: 2 October 2019 (aged 89)
- Other names: Drahomíra Liehmová, Drahomíra Olivová, Drahomíra Sisová
- Occupations: Film historian; film critic
- Spouse: Antonín J. Liehm
- Awards: Guggenheim Fellowship (1972)

Academic background
- Education: Charles University

Academic work
- Institutions: The New School for Social Research

Drahomíra N. Liehm-Novotná (Note: She originally published as Drahomíra Novotná and Drahomíra Olivová during her journalism career, before publishing as Mira Liehm for her academic books in exile.) (5 December 1929 – 2 October 2019) was a Czech film historian and critic. A 1972 Guggenheim Fellow, she wrote several books, including The Most Important Art (1977) and Passion and Defiance (1984), the former of which she co-authored with Antonín J. Liehm.

== Biography ==
She was born Drahomíra Novotná on 5 December 1929 in Prague, Czechoslovakia. She was married to writer Antonín J. Liehm. She was educated at Charles University, where she obtained her doctorate degree in literary studies in 1953.

After briefly spending time working in foreign relations for Czechoslovak Filmexport, she started working as an editor for media outlets and journals, with one of her early roles being as editor-in-chief for Československý film. She was deputy editor-in-chief for Film a doba, as well as editor for both Divadelní a filmové noviny and the Journal of Cinema and Television in Prague. She also worked for Filmové a televizní noviny.

She would publish reviews and critical studies in some of the periodicals she worked with. She specialized in Italian and Eastern European film, with her works including Il cinema nell'Europa dell'Est 1960–1977 (1977) and Passion and Defiance (1984). In 1972, she and her husband were awarded a joint Guggenheim Fellowship for a history of cinema in Eastern Europe. In 1977, she and her husband co-authored The Most Important Art.

She was among several signatories to "The Two Thousand Words" in 1968. Following this, she fled the country alongside her husband, eventually settling in the United States. She worked at The New School for Social Research as a lecturer (1971–1972). In 1982, she and her husband moved to France, where she was a contributor to Lettre International (which her husband ran). She was part of the selection committee of the International Filmfestival Mannheim-Heidelberg.

In 2013, she and her husband moved back to Prague. She died on 2 October 2019, at the age of 90.

== Publications ==
- The Most Important Art (1977, with Antonín J. Liehm) (Note: Reviews of this book:)
- Passion and Defiance (1984) (Note: Reviews of this book:)
