= Cecílie Jílková =

Czech journalist and writer

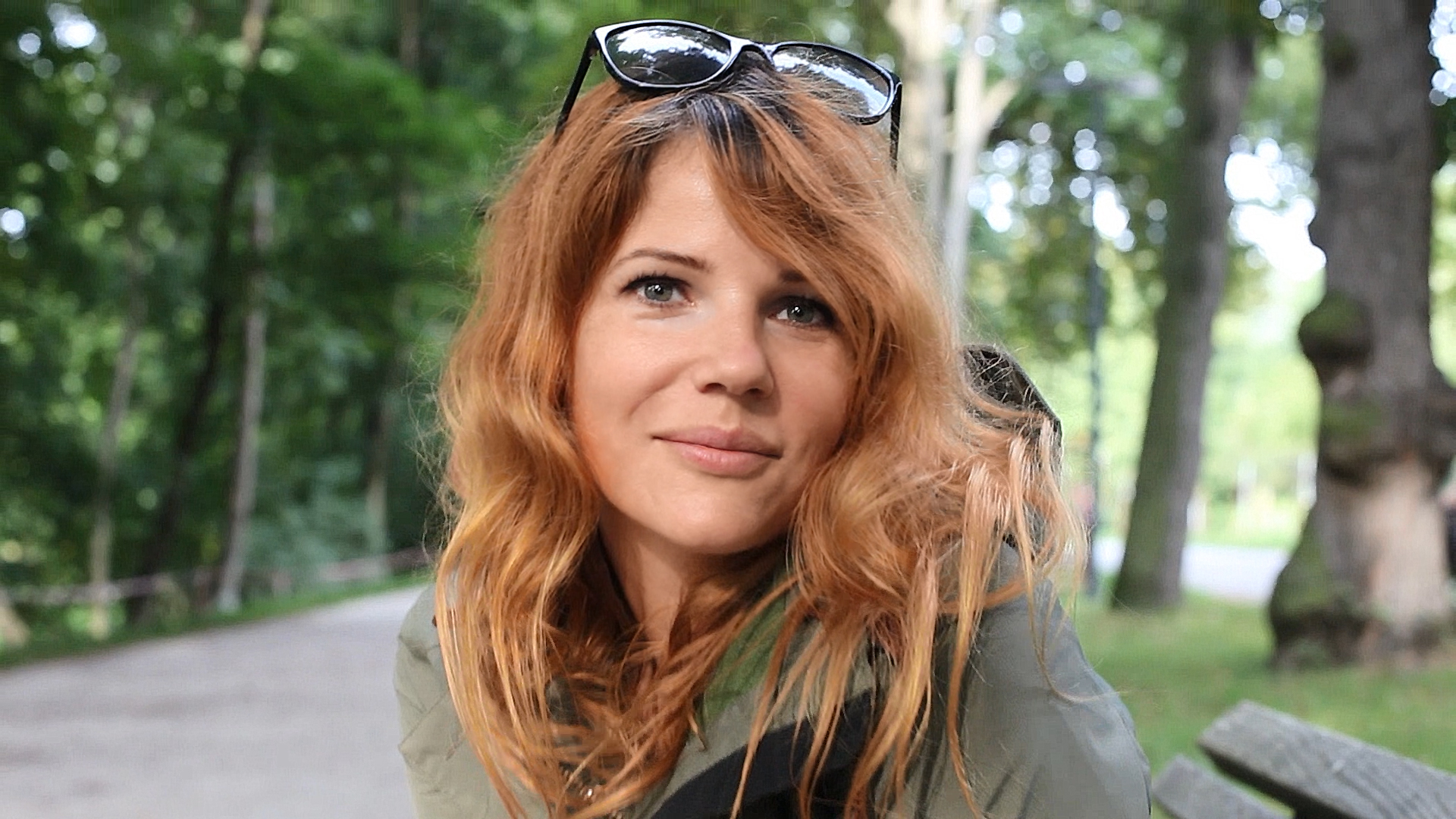
- Jílková in 2021
- Born: Cecílie Vaculíková; 23 August 1981 (age 45); Prague, Czechoslovakia
- Citizenship: Czech Republic
- Occupations: Novelist, journalist, screenwriter, singer
- Children: Izabela Jílková
- Parent(s): Ludvík Vaculík; Lenka Procházková
- Relatives: Jan Procházka (grandfather)
- Website: ceciliejilkova.com

Cecílie Jílková (born 23 August 1981) is a Czech novelist, journalist, screenwriter and singer. She is the author of the autobiographical novel Otec Bůh a matka Láska ("Father God and Mother Love"; 2024), in which she describes growing up in a family of prominent Czechoslovak dissidents who opposed the communist regime and were signatories of Charter 77. She also works as an investigative journalist covering digitalisation, EU regulation, and freedom of speech.

== Family ==
Jílková is the daughter of writers Ludvík Vaculík, one of the most prominent Czech writers and dissidents, known for authoring the Two Thousand Words manifesto (1968), and Lenka Procházková, a novelist who was banned from publishing under the communist regime. Her grandfather was Jan Procházka, a screenwriter and Communist Party reformist who died prematurely at 42 after being targeted by a regime-orchestrated smear campaign. Her aunt is the children's author Iva Procházková and her sister is the filmmaker Maria Procházková. Her great-grandfather Přemysl Micka was a teacher and resistance fighter who was tortured to death by the Gestapo at Kaunic Dormitories, a former student dormitory in Brno used as a Gestapo prison and execution site during World War II.

== Biography ==
=== Early life and education ===
Cecílie Jílková was born in 1981 in Prague, Czechoslovakia. She grew up in a family of two prominent Czech dissidents — her father Ludvík Vaculík and her mother Lenka Procházková. She later wrote about her childhood during Normalization — the period of political repression that followed the Soviet-led invasion of Czechoslovakia in 1968 — and her adolescence after the Velvet Revolution of 1989 in the autobiographical novel Otec Bůh a matka Láska.

=== Literary and journalistic beginnings ===
At the age of twenty-five, she wrote her debut novel, the futuristic utopia Cesta na Drromm (Road to Drromm; 2010). She subsequently wrote feuilletons and articles for Lidové noviny, one of the oldest Czech daily newspapers. She published both under her own name and under the name of her father, Ludvík Vaculík. Between 2008 and 2011 she contributed articles and interviews to the medical journal Sanquis. She also wrote several scripts for Kriminálka Anděl, a Czech television crime series broadcast by TV Nova.

=== Nutrition writing and publishing ===
From 2013, Jílková focused on healthy eating, publishing articles on her blog and on a popular Czech nutrition portal. Between 2016 and 2019 she ran her own publishing house, Procházka Publishing, together with her mother, releasing four books in the Eat To Be Slim (Czech: Najím se a zhubnu!) series — a lifestyle guide and three recipe books. The first two became bestsellers in the Czech Republic. She illustrated three of the four books with her own photographs.

=== Return to prose and investigative journalism ===
In 2021, Jílková returned to prose with the autobiographical novel Father God and Mother Love, which was published three years later in November 2024 by SPM Media.

In 2022 she began publishing on the topics of digitalisation and freedom of speech, focusing on EU regulation of social media, the development of the European Digital Identity Wallet, and the proposed Chat Control legislation.

In 2024 she established a collaboration with American journalist Michael Shellenberger and other signatories of the Westminster Declaration. For Shellenberger's magazine Public, she covered Chat Control and other EU legislative proposals. Her latest audiovisual project is the investigative podcast Oč tu běží (What's Going On), investigating Czech corruption cases, available on Patreon, Substack and the inFAKTA.cz website. She co-produced the podcast with journalist Markéta Dobiášová.

=== Music ===
Jílková studied musical instruments and solo singing as a child. Her father Ludvík Vaculík taught her Czech folk songs and encouraged her to perform publicly. They recorded together at the Czech Radio Ostrava studio in 1993. Her mother, the writer Lenka Procházková, authored a number of song lyrics. Jílková sang and released some of them in collaboration with digital producer dj kosa on the album Vyznání (Confession, 2025).

== Works ==
=== Prose ===
- Cesta na Drromm (Road to Drromm, 2010, Millenium Publishing) — debut novel, a futuristic novel. A near-future story about a young man named Teodor who, threatened by a fatal illness, departs for the newly discovered planet Drromm, where a small group of settlers is building a society based on principles different from those prevailing on Earth.
- Otec Bůh a matka Láska (Father God and Mother Love, 2024, SPM Media) — autobiographical novel. Drawing on her own experience, Jílková examines the theory of Canadian psychiatrist Gábor Maté on the link between childhood trauma and the increased risk of addiction in adulthood. She argues against the use of violence in parenting and describes its consequences. The book also captures fragments of Czech national history in a kaleidoscopic fashion, from the Prague Spring and the subsequent Normalization to the changes following the Velvet Revolution of 1989.

=== Nutrition books ===
The Eat To Be Slim (Najím se a zhubnu!) series, published by Procházka Publishing:

- Najím se a zhubnu! Praktický průvodce změnou životního stylu (Eat To Be Slim! A Practical Guide to Lifestyle Change, 2016) — a guide to healthy eating with an emphasis on natural food sources and lowering the glycaemic index.
- Najím se a zhubnu! Recepty na celý rok (Eat To Be Slim! Recipes for the Whole Year, 2017) — a healthy recipe book.
- Moje mlsání bez cukru a bez lepku (My Sugar-Free and Gluten-Free Treats, 2018) — sugar-free and gluten-free dessert recipes.
- Najím se a zhubnu! Recepty pro celou rodinu (Eat To Be Slim! Recipes for the Whole Family, 2019) — family-oriented recipes.

=== Audiovisual work ===
==== Screenplays ====
- Kriminálka Anděl (a Czech TV crime series) – Pohřbená zaživa (S03E03, 2012)
- Kriminálka Anděl – Krása bolí (S03E15, 2012)
- Kriminálka Anděl – Zvěřinec (S04E06, 2014)

==== Documentary and podcast work ====
- Digitální (R)evoluce (Digital (R)evolution, 2023) — a twelve-part documentary mini-series for V.O.X. TV exploring the potential, benefits and pitfalls of digitalisation. The series features figures from finance, investment and technology, presenting the views of a younger generation raised in the internet age.
- Oč tu běží (What's Going On, 2025) — a twenty-six-part investigative podcast investigating Czech corruption cases. Co-authored with journalist Markéta Dobiášová.

=== Albums ===
- Radosti, radosti (Joys, Joys, 1993, Supraphon, the major Czech state-owned record label) — vocals on an album of songs and spoken word by Ludvík Vaculík.
- Vyznání (Confession, 2025) — a digital album of chansons with lyrics by Lenka Procházková and music by digital producer dj kosa. Available on Spotify, Apple Music, Amazon Music and Tidal.
