= Christina Åstrand =

Danish violinist (born 1969)

- Born: 6 June 1969 (age 57); Skanderborg
- Instrument: violin
- Member of: Danish National Symphony Orchestra

Christina Åstrand (born 6 June 1969) is a Danish violinist. When she was just 22, she became leader of the Danish National Symphony Orchestra, a position she still holds today.

== Biography ==
Born on 6 June 1969 in Skanderborg, Åstrand was the daughter Tony Agne Åstrand and Anne-Grete Keller. She was brought up in a musical family in which her father player the trumpet and her maternal grandmother was a pianist. She began to play the violin when she was four at Aarhus School of Music where she was first taught for two years by Tove Detreköy and thereafter for a further two years by her husband Bela Detrekov who specialized in Hungarian music. Both employed the Suzuki method where the pupils learn to play short tunes by ear.

Thanks to her good progress, when she was 13 she was able to enter the Royal Academy of Music in Aarhus where she was one of the youngest students ever. She was taught by Tutter Givskov who continued to motivate her for many years. After graduating in 1988, she spent a year in Paris as a private student of Gérard Poulet.

On her return to Denmark in 1990, she accepted an offer from the Aarhus Symphony Orchestra to step in as the soloist for the Danish premiere of the violin concerto Offertorium by the Russian composer Sofia Gubaidulina. The following week she performed as the leader of the newly established Århus Sinfonietta at their very first public concert. She maintained her position there for some time, maintaining a high standard together with the conductor Søren K. Hansen and the composer Hans Abrahamsen. In 1993, when she was 24, together with Johannes Soe Hansen, she was appointed leader of the Danish National Symphony Orchestra. She also took on the role of soloist in the violin concertos of György Ligeti and Per Nørgård, both of which were recorded.

While she has maintained her position with the National Symphony Orchestra, she has also been a guest soloist with all the leading Scandinavian orchestras, performing not only in the classical concertos of Beethoven, Sibelius and Tchaikovsky but also in modern works. She also performs chamber music, often with Per Salo, her husband, who is a pianist. The couple sometimes play with Jakob Keiding in the Danish Horn Trio. Åstrand's recordings also include works by Niels Gade, Claude Debussy and Fini Henriques. In September 2014, she performed with the Chicago Philharmonic in a concert titled "Nordic Sounds".

== Awards ==
Åstrand, a Dame of the Order of the Dannebrog, has received several awards including a Jacob Gade instrumentalist award in 1988 and the Diapason d'Or in 2001.
