= Maratón (film) =

- Directed by: Ivo Novák
- Written by: Ivo Novák; Jan Procházka
- Starring: Jaromír Hanzlík; Jana Brejchová; Vladimír Menšík
- Cinematography: Václav Hanus
- Edited by: Jirina Lukesová
- Music by: Zdeněk Liška
- Release date: 1968
- Running time: 100 minutes
- Country: Czechoslovakia
- Language: Czech

Maratón (English title The Marathon) is a 1968 Czechoslovak war film celebrating the liberation of Prague by Red Army. The film was directed by Ivo Novák starring Jaromír Hanzlík, Jana Brejchová, Karel Höger and Vladimír Menšík.

The movie follows two separated storylines: In one, young Czech Ruda Střecha (Jaromír Hanzlík) is liberated from Pankrác gestapo prison at the beginning of the Prague uprising, 5 May 1945. He meets young servant-maid Karla (Jana Brejchová) and together they try to escape from Prague surrounded by German troops but they are inevitably drawn into the fighting.

The same day, Jarda Střecha (Vladimír Menšík) older brother of Ruda, who fights as the soldier of the 1st Czechoslovak Army Corps in Carpathian mountains hears about the uprising in Prague and is immediately transferred to Saxony. As the prewar truck driver he now becomes a guide to the 3rd Guards Tank Army of the general Rybalko (Karel Höger) and witnesses the bravery and sacrifice of Soviet soldiers in their "race to Prague".

The story culminates by the liberation of Prague on 9 May 1945.
