= Vester Allés Kaserne =

Military building in Aarhus, Denmark

Coordinates: 56°09′12.7″N 10°12′03.4″E

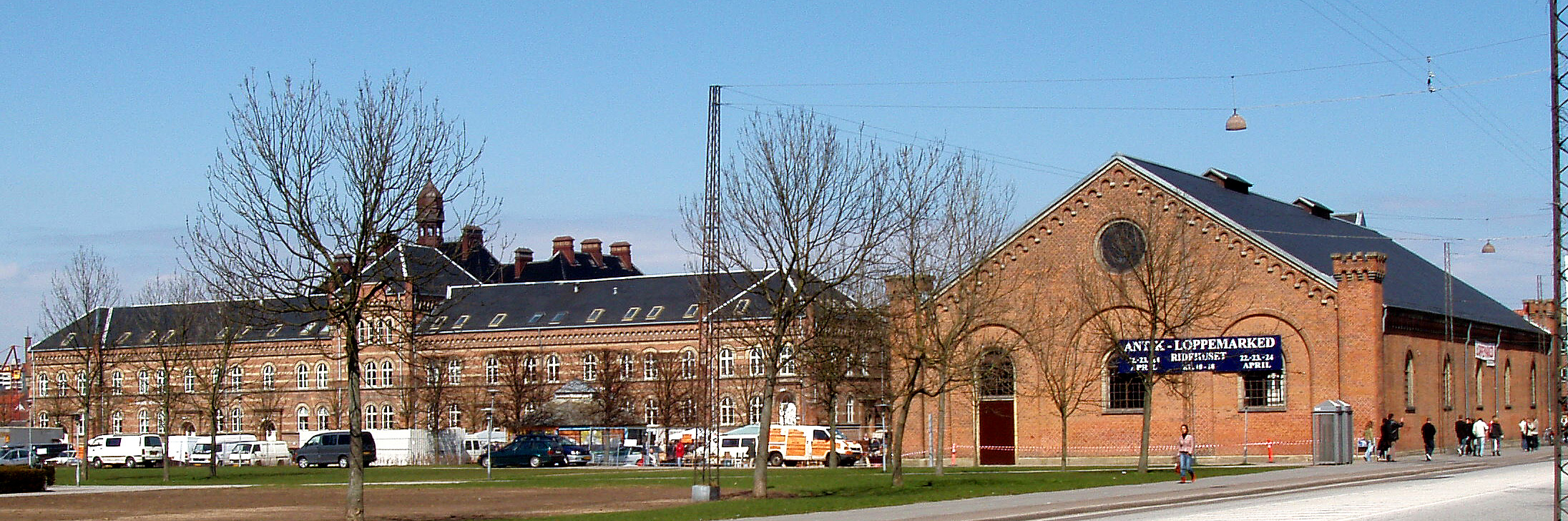
The riding hall and officers building of Vester Allé Kaserne

Vester Allé Kaserne is a former military barracks and listed building in the city of Aarhus. The barracks was built on the area between Vester Allé, Frederiks Allé and Thomas Jensens Allé in 1875-1878 and was closed in 1969 after which the buildings were taken over by Aarhus Municipality. There are two remaining buildings left from the original complex; the Officersbygningen (The Officers Buildings) and Ridehuset (The Riding Hall).

Today the riding hall today functions as a small multi-hall in Aarhus city hosting concerts, exhibitions and markets; frequently cultural events, but anyone can rent it and use it for private or commercial purposes as well. The officers building is home to Aarhus School of Music and the Aarhus Festuge secretariat. There is a small café here too - Café Monroe -, serving breakfast and lunch three days in the week and occasionally hot evening meals accompanying small concerts.

The parade grounds between the buildings feature a white wooden building known as Jacob Haugaards' Toilet. It was constructed when Jacob Haugaard was elected to the Folketing in 1994 and one of his campaign promises was to build a toilet there.

== Architecture ==
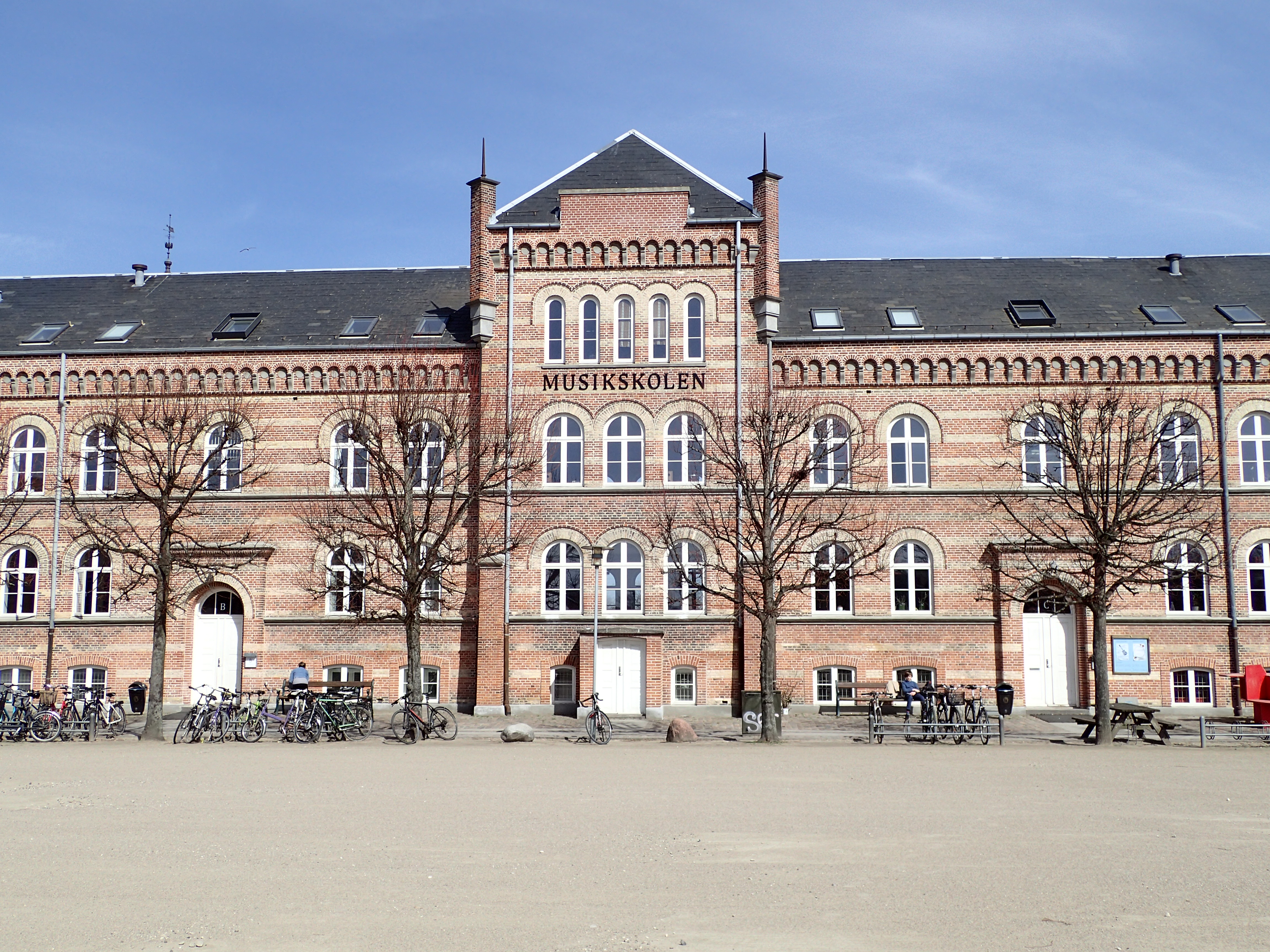
Facade detail of the barracks building

Vester Allé Kaserne is an example of the National Romantic style; designed by Carl Lange. The officers building is a three floor structure with a basement, constructed in 1874-1878 in conjunction with a number of other structures that are now gone. It is a red brick structure with bands of yellow bricks, arched windows and doors of yellow brick. For decorative reasons corner towers and buttresses were included. The building was meant to house 100 soldiers, officers, school rooms and commonrooms. The riding hall is a single hall of 900m2 with enough room for 1130 people.

== History ==
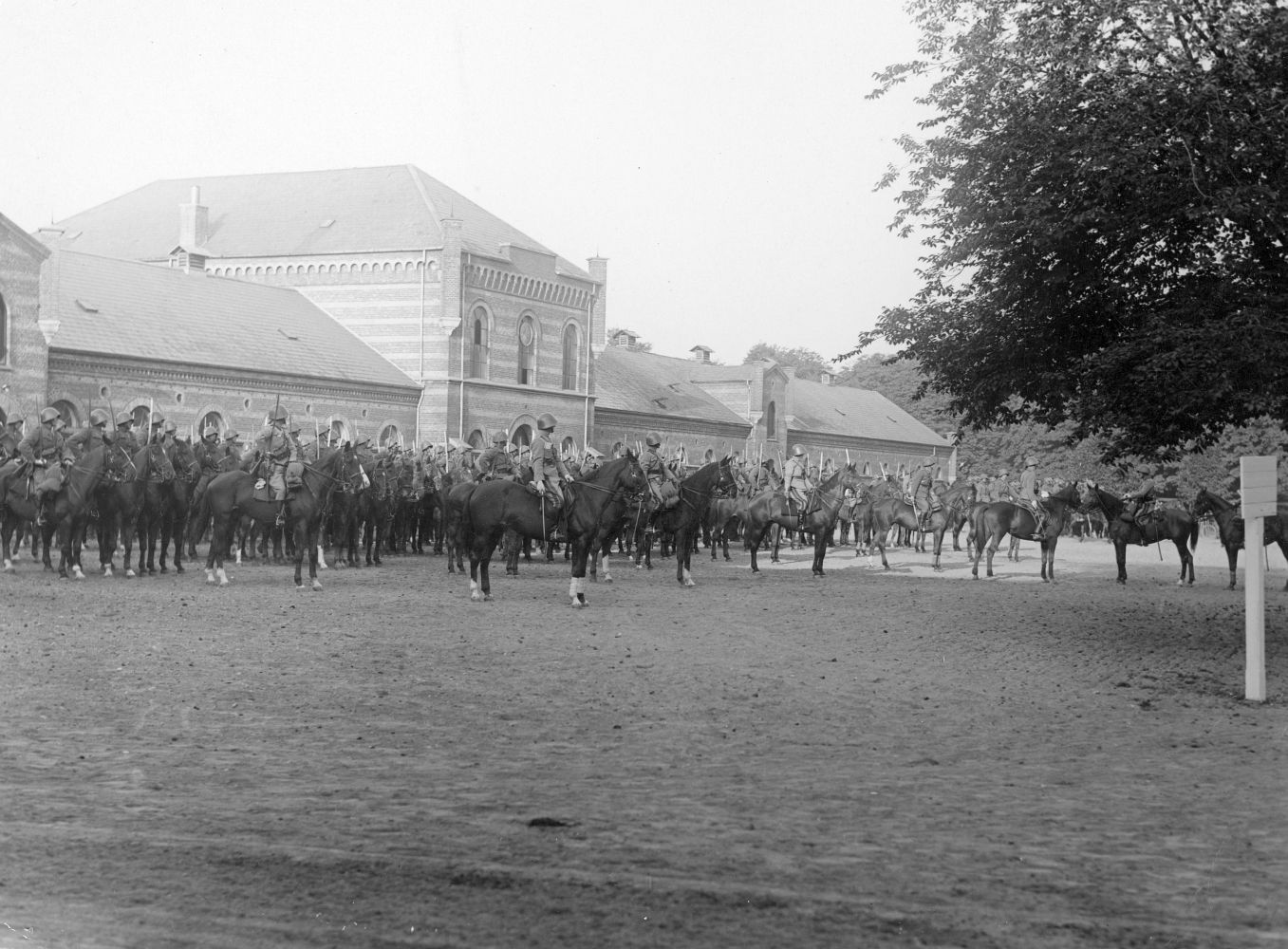
Dragoon Parade at Vester Allés Kaserne (1929).

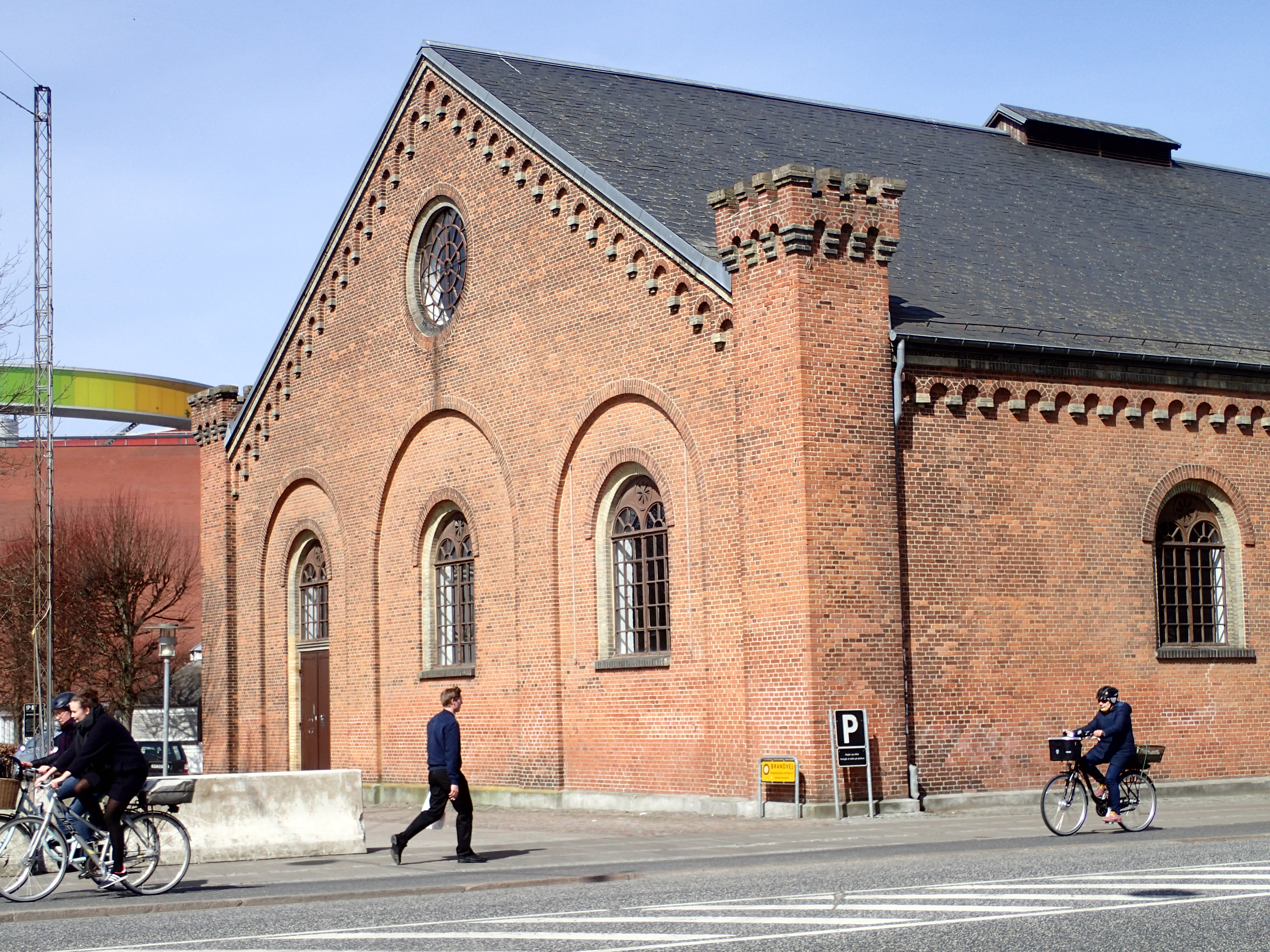
Riding Hall detail

The riding hall was constructed in 1860 by the Ministry of War for the 3rd Dragoon Regiment, also called Prins Frederik Ferdinands Dragoons, which had been stationed in Aarhus since 1819. The riding hall was the only military structure in the city at the time with soldiers being quartered in private homes and interimistic barracks around the city. In the 1860s the garrison was increased and it became necessary to build new barracks.

The new cavalry barracks was constructed in 1875-1878 and was situated next to the existing riding hall. The first buildings completed were the school stables and in 1876 the school barracks along Vester Allé were also ready for use. In addition to school facilities the building included homes for officers so in common parlance it became known as the Officers Building. The 3rd Dragoon Regiment also had their own barracks and stables in the area in addition to a junior officers building in Valdemarsgade. The only buildings remaining are the Riding Hall and Officers Building.

In 1936 the Dragoon Regiment was moved to Holstebro and the barracks was taken over by a light armored regiment, two cyclist squadrons and two field artillery units from the 3rd artillery regiment. While the cannons were horsedrawn, the dragoons were gone so the Cavalry Barracks officially changed name to Vester Allé Kaserne.

During World War II, all barracks in Aarhus was occupied by German forces, but they found the facilities to be inadequate, so wooden structures were erected on the parade grounds. In 1944, the artillery barracks Langelandsgade Kaserne was bombed, leaving the city with insufficient space for the garrison after the war and the wooden structures were eventually left in place, until Vester Allé Kaserne was closed in 1969.

== Garrisoned units ==
- 1876-1932 3. Dragoon Regiment
- 1933-1940 3. Artillery Unit and 9. Artillery Unit
- 1940-1945 Occupied by German troops
- 1953-1955 8. Regimental Staff
- 1960-1962 34. Artillery Unit
- 1951-1969 23. and 33. Artillery Units, Nørrejyske Artillery Regiment
