= Lenka Procházková =

Czech writer (born 1951)

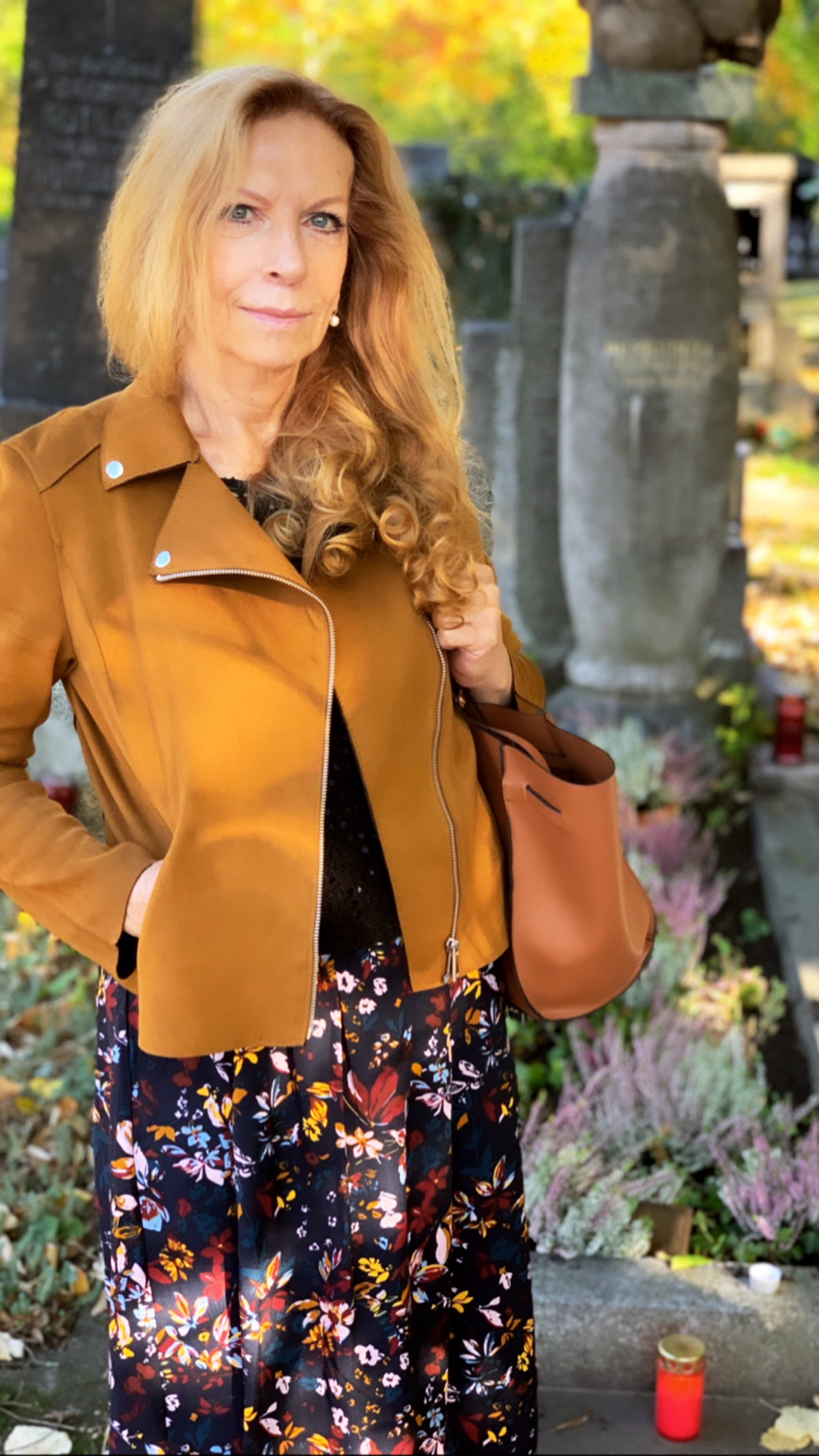
- Lenka Procházková, 2015
- Born: 24 March 1951 (age 75); Olomouc, Czechoslovakia
- Citizenship: Czech Republic
- Partner: Ludvík Vaculík
- Children: Maria Procházková; Cecílie Jílková; Josef Vaculík
- Parent(s): Jan Procházka; Mahulena Procházková
- Website: lenka-prochazkova.eu

Lenka Procházková (born 24 March 1951) is a Czech writer.

The daughter of writer Jan Procházka, she was born in Olomouc, grew up in Prague and studied journalism and cultural theory at Charles University in Prague. Procházková signed Charter 77 and, as a result, was forced to work as a manual labourer until 1989. She was later employed in various social and cultural agencies. She also taught at Josef Škvorecký’s Literary Academy. She had a long-term partnership with writer Ludvík Vaculík, with whom she had two sons.

In 1982, she received the Egon Hostovský Prize.

Procházková published her first novel Růžová dáma (The Pink Lady) in 1982. She has also written radio plays and scripts for television. With lawyer Aleš Pejchal, she hosted a program on Radio Free Europe.

Her sister Iva is also a novelist.

== Works ==
- Oční kapky (Eye Drops), novel (1987)
- Hlídač holubů (Pigeon Guard), short stories (1987)
- Smolná kniha (Doomsday book), novel (1991)
- Zvrhlé dny (Perverse days), short stories (1995)
- Pan ministr (Mr. Minister), historical work (1996)
- Beránek [The Lamb], novel (2000)
