= Carl Lange (architect) =

Danish architect

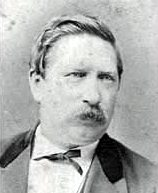
- Carl Lange c. 1878
- Born: 5 December 1828; Copenhagen, Denmark
- Died: 21 May 1900 (aged 71); Aarhus, Denmark
- Education: Royal Danish Academy of Fine Arts
- Occupation: Architect
- Buildings: Vester Allé Barracks, Mejlen
- Projects: Frijsenborg

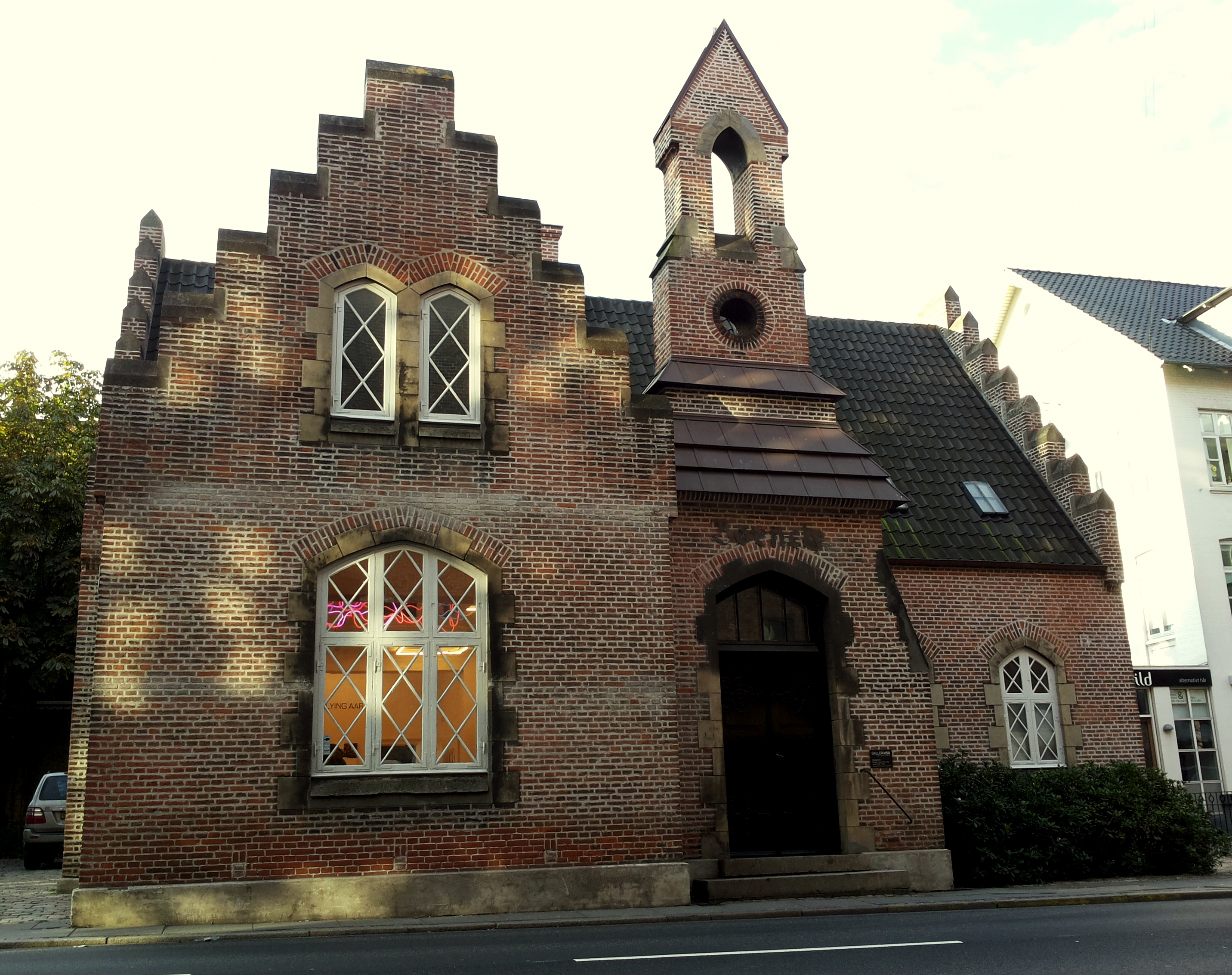
Mejlen, Aarhus

Carl Christian Eduard Lange (5 December 1828 – 21 May 1900) was a Danish architect known primarily for his works on manors and churches in Jutland and several prominent buildings in Aarhus.

== Biography ==
Carl Lange was born in Copenhagen to Christian Suhr Lange and Anne Sophie Torp. Initially, he was trained as a watchmaker, but the work did not interest him, and he instead sought admission to the Danish Royal Danish Academy of Fine Arts, which was granted in 1841. He graduated from the academy in 1849 with a degree in architecture. Not much is known about the years after graduation but in the 1860s he is first mentioned as the foreman for the architect Ferdinand Meldahl during the construction of the manor Frijsenborg.

In the period following his work at Frijsenborg, Carl Lange was commissioned as the architect in Favrskov Municipality for the manor Frijsendal and several farm buildings for the manor Søbygård. In 1869, he settled in Aarhus and quickly became a prominent architect in the city. In the 1870s, he designed and built the Vester Allé Barracks, Infantry Barracks and the Garrison Hospital. He continued his work in the following decades, creating Mejlen, Hotel Skandinavien, Sønder Girls School, along with many residential and industrial buildings. From his initial work on Frijsendal manor, Lange had established connections to the surrounding countryside, and he worked on several manors and village churches throughout his life.

Lange became well respected for his works and was a member of the Craftsmen's Association in Aarhus for a number of years and was a co-founder of the local Freemason chapter. He was a member of Aarhus city council from 1873 to 1878.

== Works ==
- The manor Frijsendal
- Farm buildings for the manor Søbygaard
- Infantry Barracks, Aarhus (1875–79)
- Vester Allé Barracks, Aarhus (1876–77)
- Garrison Hospital, Aarhus (1877)
- Addition to the manor Vilhelmsborg (1877)
- Mejlen, Aarhus (1880s)
- Hotel Skandinavien, Aarhus
- Sønder Girls School, Aarhus (1883–84)
- Viborg Borger School, Viborg (1887–88)
- Wormhus, Aarhus
- Many farm buildings and estates including the manor Thomasminde
- Additions and reconstructions on several churches including churches in Kasted, Trige, Mørke and Hornslet
