= Slasti Otce vlasti =

- Directed by: Karel Steklý
- Written by: Jan Procházka; Karel Steklý
- Starring: Jaromír Hanzlík
- Release date: 8 July 1969
- Running time: 101 minutes
- Country: Czechoslovakia
- Language: Czech

Slasti Otce vlasti is a 1969 Czech comedy film directed by Karel Steklý.

== Cast ==
- Jaromír Hanzlík as Kralevic Karel
- Miloš Kopecký as Jan Lucemburský
- Daniela Kolářová as Blanka z Valois
