= The Axe (novel) =

1966 novel by Ludvík Vaculík

Sekyra ('The Axe') is a 1966 novel by the Czech author Ludvík Vaculík. Like Milan Kundera's The Joke (1967), The Axe was an influential novel in Czechoslovakia during the 1960s cultural awakening.
