= Léto s kovbojem =

- Film poster
- Directed by: Ivo Novák
- Written by: Jaromíra Kolárová
- Produced by: Tomáš Baloun (assistant)
- Starring: Daniela Kolářová; Jaromír Hanzlík; Oldřich Vízner
- Cinematography: Rudolf Milic
- Music by: Petr Hapka
- Release date: 1976
- Running time: 90 minutes
- Country: Czechoslovakia
- Language: Czech

Léto s kovbojem, Summer With a Cowboy in English, is a 1976 Czechoslovak film directed by Ivo Novák. It starred Daniela Kolářová, Jaromír Hanzlík and Oldřich Vízner.

== Casting ==
- Daniela Kolářová — Doubravka
- Jaromír Hanzlík — Honza
- Oldřich Vízner — Boba
- Jiří Pleskot — Father
- Libuše Švormová — Mother
- Dana Medřická — Doubravka's grandmother
- Marie Rosůlková — Great-grandmother
