= Taková normální rodinka =

1971 Czechoslovak TV series

- Genre: Comedy
- Written by: Fan Vavřincová
- Directed by: Jaroslav Dudek
- Country of origin: Czechoslovakia
- No. of episodes: 8

Production
- Running time: 55 minutes

Original release
- Release: 1971 – 1972

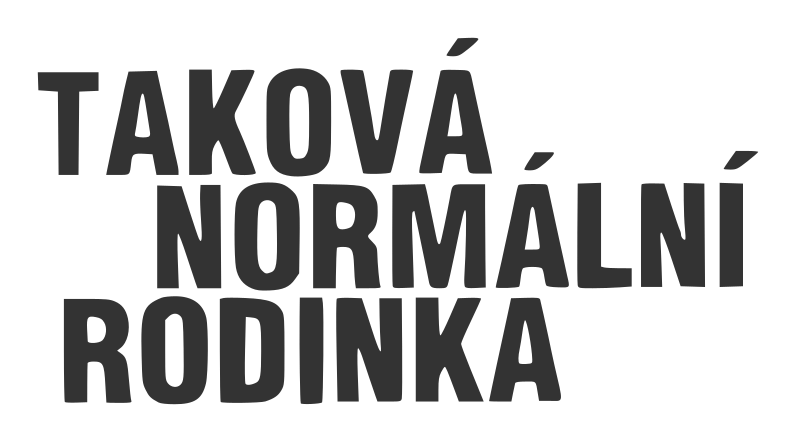
Logo of the TV show

Taková normální rodinka (Just an Ordinary Family) was a Czechoslovak television programme which was first broadcast in 1971. The programme was directed by Jaroslav Dudek. Originally shot as a stand-alone situation comedy piece of approx. 45 minutes of length, that later became a pilot for a series of eight episodes. It takes place solely in one house.

Taková normální rodinka was received positively, having scores of 8.2 at IMDb and 86% at ČSFD (Czechoslovak film database). Taková normální rodinka is considered to be the first (and by many Czechs and Slovaks the best) Czechoslovak sitcom.

In 2006, it was released on DVD. In 2010 a follow-up, called Rodinka (Family) and directed by Dušan Klein, was released but didn't get anywhere near the acclaim of the original series.

== Plot ==
Situation comedy that takes place in a family house of four generations. Contrary to the name of the series, the family living there is not exactly a shining example of a typical family, however, its members try to stand up to the challenges and troubles together.

=== Political climate ===
Taková normální rodinka was written as a contemporary series whose characters were to put up with problems of that time. 1971 in Czechoslovakia was a period of normalization (tightened-up phase of the communist reign in the republic, that followed 1968 Russian invasion). Screenplays for each episode were subject for censorship, and the pressure put on authors to engage more with the communistic ideology resulted in discontinuation of the series after the eight episode. Examples of that include a children's party that had to involve so called pioneers (of the socialist union of youth), or a foreign business trip that had to be to Cuba. One of the supporting roles, written for Pavel Landovský, had to be taken over by different actor, for political repressions against Landovský.

== Characters ==
- Granny (Marie Rosůlková), author of detective stories, none of which were ever published; obsessed with ways of committing a murder, trying that on other family members
- Mother Cilka (Dana Medřická), a cook, works in RaJ (restaurants & diners); likes to sing opera arias; keen to uphold the family reputation
- Father Oldřich (Zdeněk Řehoř), train dispatcher, loves animals, keeps two turtles, mice and a snake at home
- Their elder daughter Pavla (Jana Štěpánková), yoga exerciser
- Péťa (Eduard Cupák), Pavla's husband, his favourite activities is reading or sleeping on a couch, dodging as many household duties as possible
- Petr and Pavel, also referred to as raubíři (rascals), Pavla's and Péťa's vibrant kids
- Káča (Daniela Kolářová), Pavla's younger sister; works in OPBH (approx. District Company of Flat Management); in love with Zdeněk
- Zdeněk (Jaromír Hanzlík), Káča's fiancé and later husband that is accepted into the family; works as a botanist

== Episodes ==
1. Ženich (Bridegroom)
2. Před svatbou (Before the Marriage)
3. Po svatbě (After the Marriage)
4. Výročí (Anniversary)
5. Ženich pro tetičku (Bridegroom for Auntie)
6. Škola manželů (School of the Spouses)
7. Záletník (A Philanderer)
8. Dáreček (A Present)
