= Daniela Kolářová =

Czech actress

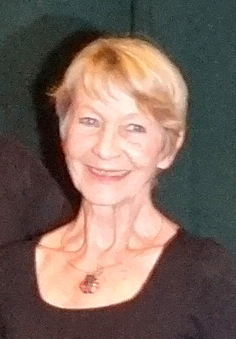
- Born: 21 August 1946 (age 79); Cheb, Czechoslovakia
- Occupation: Actress
- Years active: 1967–present
- Spouse: Jiří Ornest
- Children: 2

Daniela Kolářová (born 21 September 1946 in Cheb) is a Czech actress.

She has appeared in several Theatre Studio DVA productions.

== Filmography ==
=== Film ===
- Kawasaki's Rose (2009)
- Empties (2007) ... Eliška
- Dark Blue World (2001) ... Haniččina matka
- Oběti a vrazi (2000) ... matka
- Cesta z města (2000) ... matka Markéty
- V erbu lvice (1994) ... Anežka
- Accumulator 1 (1993) ... Marta Fišárková
- The Elementary School (1991) ... Maxová
- Horká kaše (1988) ... Adamová
- Případ se psem (1988)
- Jsi falešný hráč (1986) ... Peterková
- ..a zase ta Lucie (1984) ... maminka
- Lucie, postrach ulice (1984) ... maminka
- Babičky dobíjejte přesně! (1983) ... Loudová
- Pod nohama nebe (1983) ... Darina
- Pytláci (1981) ... Františka
- Ta chvíle, ten okamžik (1981) ... Helena Kodetová
- Brontosaurus (1980) ... Bižoléčára
- Ball Lightning (1978) ... Knotková
- Sneh pod nohami (1978) ... Zuza Melichová
- Setkání v červenci (1978) ... Klára
- Léto s kovbojem (1976) ... Doubravka
- Seclusion Near a Forest (1976) ... Lavičková
- Muž z Londýna (1974) ... Sýkorova milenka
- A Night at Karlstein (1973) ... Alena
- Na kolejích čeká vrah (1970) ... Dvorská
- Slasti Otce vlasti (1969) ... Blanka z Valois
- Soukromá vichřice (1967) ... Bohunka Augustová

=== Television ===
- Ulice (2006-2007) (TV serial)
- Černá karta (2005)
- Návrat zbloudilého pastýře (2004)
- PF 77 (2003)
- Nemocnice na kraji města po dvaceti letech (2003) (TV serial)
- Můj otec a ostatní muži (2003)
- Muž, který vycházel z hrobu (2001)
- Jabloňová panna (1999)
- Ohrada snů (1998)
- Na lavici obžalovaných justice (1998) (TV seriál) ... Zdena Šípová - 3,
- Báječný lázeňský život (1997)
- Lékárníkových holka (1996) (TV serial)
- Poprask na laguně (1996)
- Dobrodružství kriminalistiky IV. (1992) (TV serial) ... 22. - Holly Hobdayová
- Bylinková princezna (1991)
- Volavka (1991)
- Veselé příhody z natáčení (1988)
- O perníkové chaloupce (1987)
- Ohnivé ženy se vracejí (1986) ... lékařka
- Synové a dcery Jakuba skláře (1986) (TV serial)
- Zlá krev (1986) (TV seriál) ... Marie
- My všichni školou povinní (1984) (TV serial)
- Doktor z vejminku (1982) (TV serial)
- V zámku a podzámčí (1981)
- Dopis psaný španělsky (1980)
- Kotva u přívozu (1980)
- Lucie, postrach ulice (1980) (serial)
- Nebožtíci na bále (1979)
- Dnes v jednom domě (1979) (serial)
- Otec nebo bratr (1978)
- Smrt císaře a krále Karla IV. (1978)
- Závist naším domem vládne (1978)
- Hospital at the End of the City (1977 - 1980) (TV serial) ... Kateřina Sovová (manželka Sovy ml.)
- Žena za pultem (1977) (TV seriál) ... Soňa
- Podnájemníci (1976)
- Králův kalich (1976)
- Lesní ženka (1976)
- Thirty Cases of Major Zeman (1974) (TV serial)
- Klícka (1971) ... Venda
- Taková normální rodinka (1971) (serial) ... Kateřina
- Drobínek (1970)
- Sňatky z rozumu (1968) (serial) ... 4. díl - Marie
- Konec velké epochy (1966)

== Decorations ==
Awarded by Czech Republic

- Medal of Merit (2024)
