= Mejlen =

Coordinates: 56.15368°N 10.20425°E

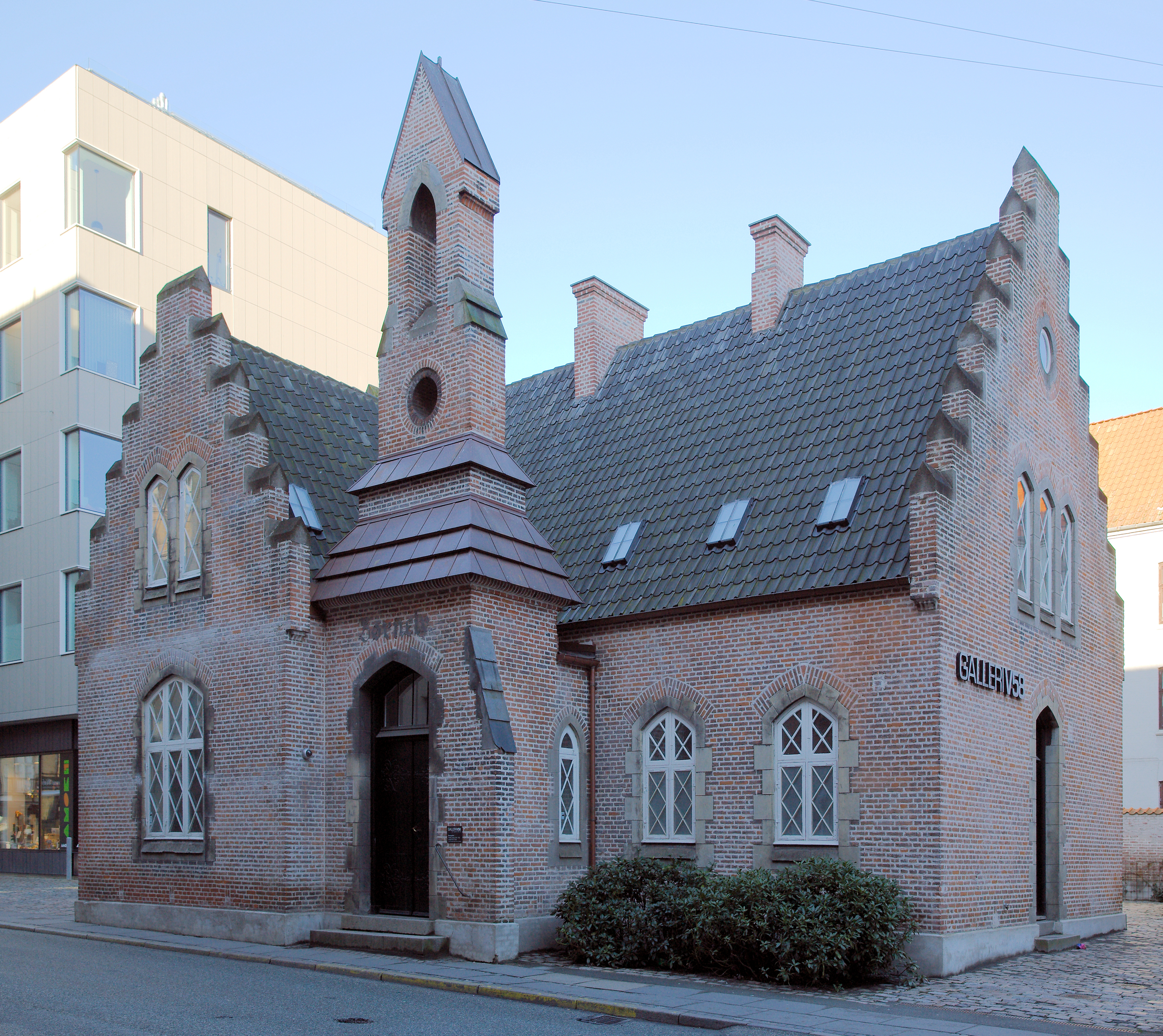
- Interactive map of the Mejlen area

General information
- Architectural style: Historicist
- Location: Aarhus, Denmark
- Completed: 1883

Technical details
- Floor count: 2

Design and construction
- Architect: Carl Lange

Mejlen or Asylet Børnely is a house, former asylum and a listed building in Aarhus, Denmark. The house was built in 1768 and was listed in the national Danish registry of protected buildings and places by the Danish Heritage Agency on 8 November 2008. The building originally functioned as a kindergarten but is today home to an art gallery.

== History ==
In the 1880s Aarhus experienced rapid growth and the population ballooned from 6.000 people in 1850 to 50.000 in 1900. The large number of new inhabitants made it necessary to provide daycare for children of the working class. The kindergarten was commissioned by the religious charitable organization Stefansforeningen and was paid for by charitable contributions and fundraisers. On 10 March 1883 an editorial in Århus Stiftstidende invited people to donate and on 9 April 1883 a list of contributors was published.

The building was designed to house 100 children and it was constructed in 1883 by architect Carl Lange. Originally the institution was simply called Asylet (English: The Asylum), which at the time meant kindergarten, but it was quickly changed to Stefansforeningens Børnely or colloquially just Børnely. The institution was managed by a number of deacons from Stefansforeningen which also used the building for religious children's services and meetings for christian organizations.

In 1954 the kindergarten was moved to a new building in Valdemarsgade where the institution Børnely has survived into the 21st century. Aarhus Municipality took over the building when it became available and moved a youth club from Mejlgade into it. The club was named Mejlen after the former address and the building is still known by this name. The club stayed until the 70s when Red Cross rented the building. In 2009 the building was listed and in 2012 it was renovated after which the art gallery V58 moved in.

== Architecture ==
The building was constructed in the historicist style popular at the time with references to Gothic and Renaissance styles while drawing clear inspiration from Diakonissestiftelsen on Frederiksbjerg from 1876. The small tower above the front entrance, which used to feature a bell, and the pointy arches of the windows are elements absent from the earlier work in Frederiksbjerg. The building material is red and brown brick.
