= Jaromír Hanzlík =

Czech actor (born 1948)

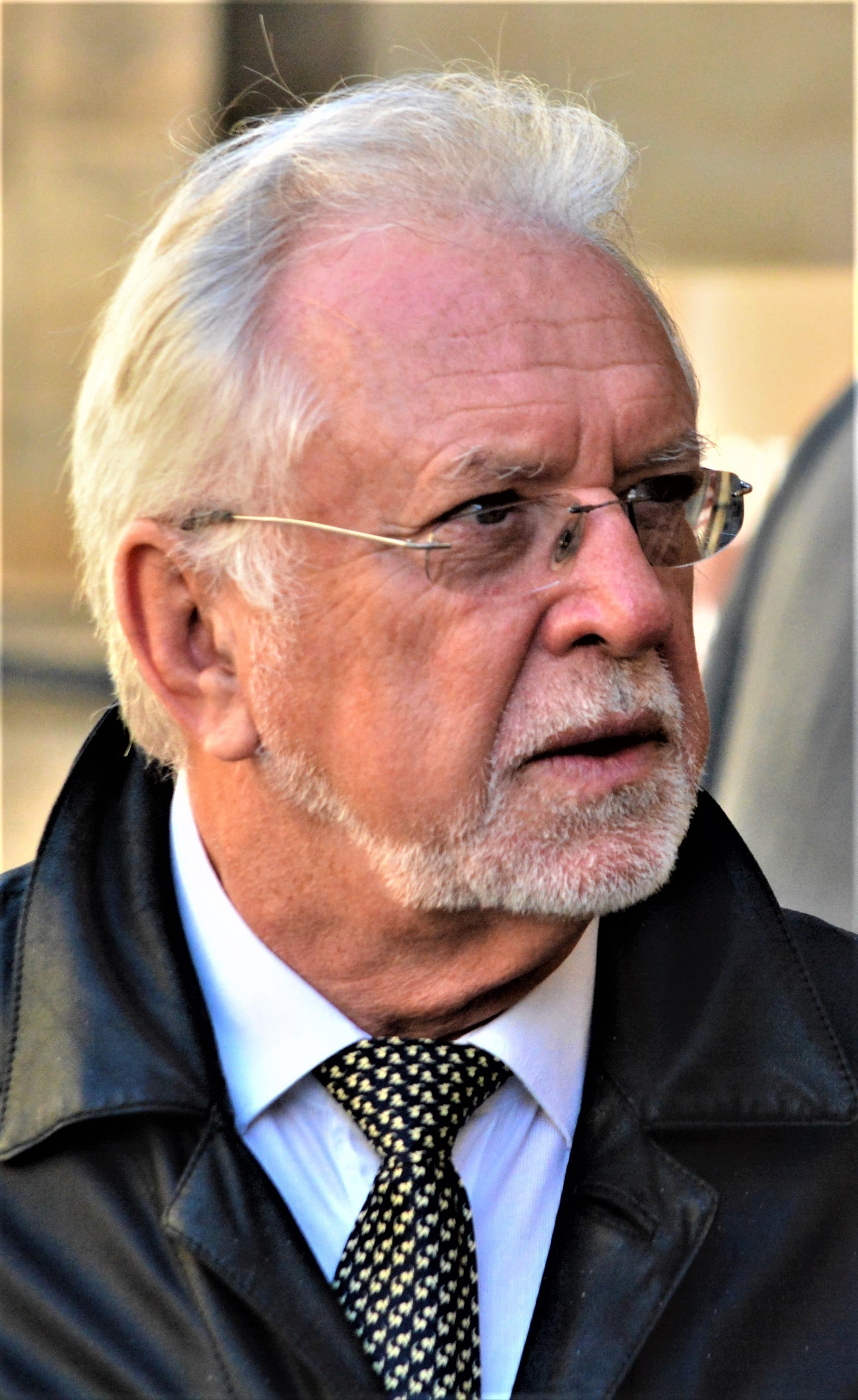
- Jaromír Hanzlík in 2019
- Born: 16 February 1948 (age 77); Český Těšín, Czechoslovakia
- Occupation: Actor
- Years active: 1958–present

Signature
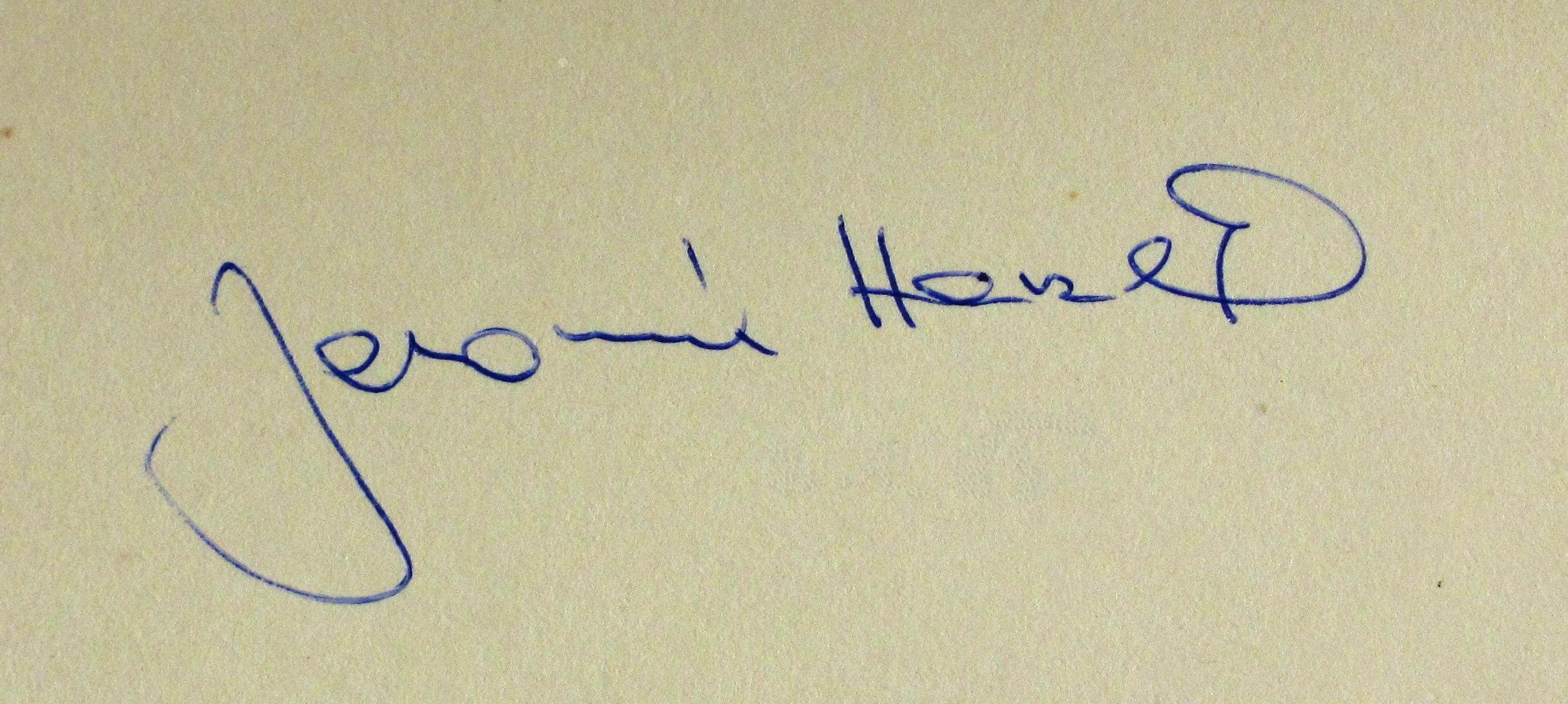

Jaromír Hanzlík (born 16 February 1948) is a Czech actor.

== Selected filmography ==
=== Film ===
- Coach to Vienna (1966)
- Romance for Bugle (1967)
- Maratón (1968)
- Slasti Otce vlasti (1969)
- The Joke (1969)
- A Night at Karlstein (1973)
- How to Drown Dr. Mracek, the Lawyer (1974)
- Léto s kovbojem (1976)
- The Ninth Heart (1979)
- Cutting It Short (1980)
- The Snowdrop Festival (1984)
- The End of Old Times (1989)
- Men in Rut (2009)
- Gangster Ka (2015)

=== Television ===
- Taková normální rodinka (1971)
- Byl jednou jeden dům (1975)
- Žena za pultem (1977)
- Plechová kavalérie (1979)
- Sanitka (1984)
- Cirkus Humberto (1988)
- Tajemství rodu (2013)

== Other notable appearances ==
In 1980, he portrayed Johannes Kepler in "Harmony of the Worlds", the third episode of Carl Sagan's 1980 Cosmos TV series. His name appears in the end credits.
