= Fan Vavřincová =

Czech writer and scriptwriter (1917–2012)

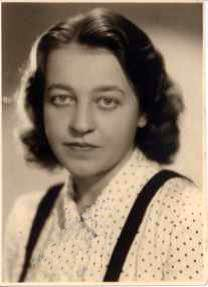
Fan Vavřincová asi 1940

Fan Vavřincová (17 November 1917 – 16 December 2012) was a Czech screenwriter, novelist, and author. Her credits as a screenwriter include the early 1970s television series, Taková normální rodinka. In addition to screenwriting, Vavřincová authored novels, often written specifically for girls, as well as short stories, detective stories, thrillers, and mysteries. Among her most well-known novels is Eva tropí hlouposti (1934), which was adapted into the 1939 film by the same name (directed by Martin Frič).

Vavřincová was born Věra Němotová in Prague, Austro-Hungarian Empire, on 17 November 1917. She began writing when she was a sixteen-year-old high school student. She married her husband, a businessman, before graduating from a French school in Prague. Together, the couple had two daughters. In 1948, the new Communist government of Czechoslovakia seized the family's home and their liquor business. Vavřincová worked as an accountant for a time while she resumed her writing.

Fan Vavřincová died on 16 December 2012 at the age of 95.
