= Ludvík Vaculík =

Czech writer and journalist (1926–2015)

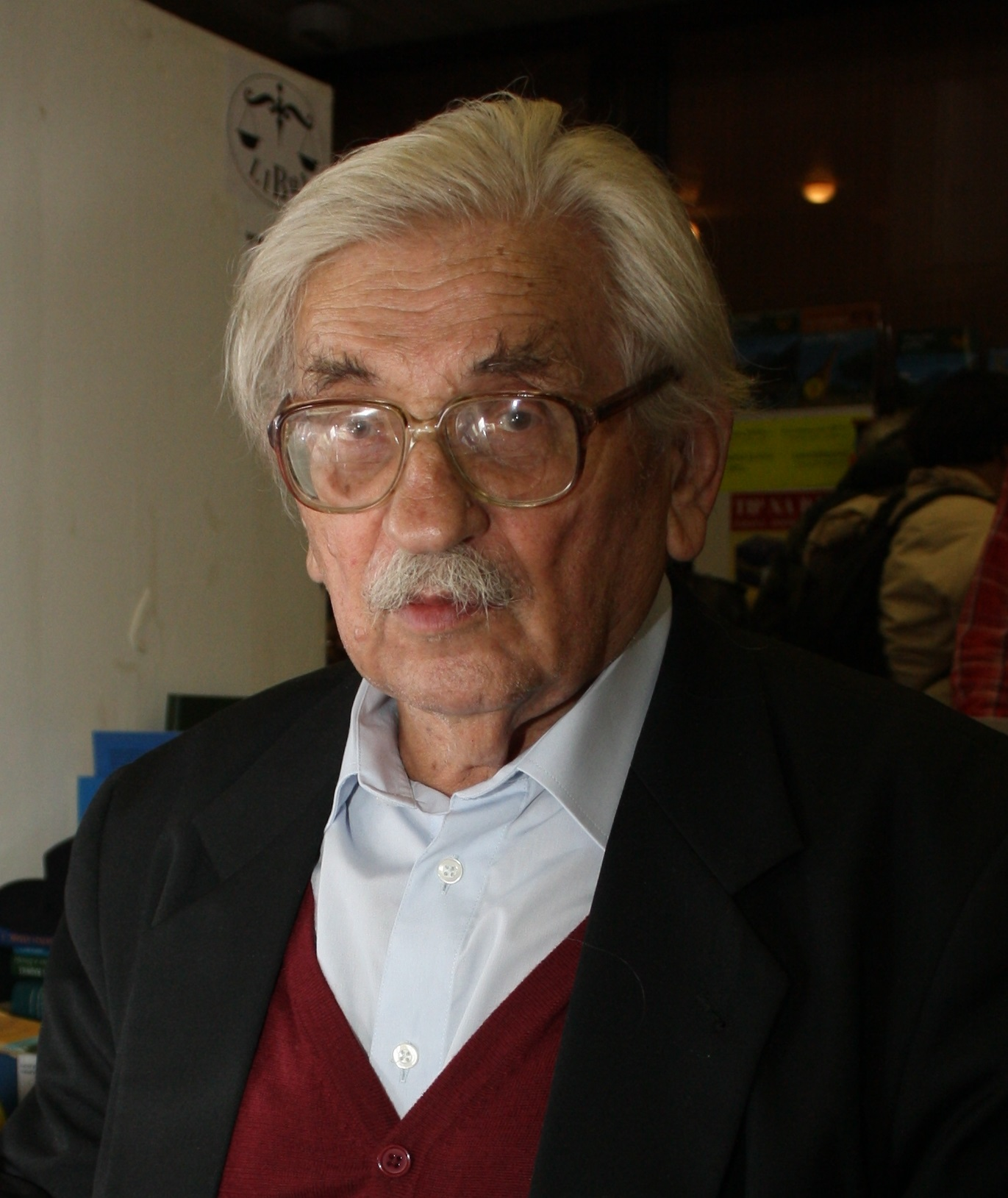
- Vaculík in 2010
- Born: 23 July 1926; Brumov-Bylnice, Czechoslovakia
- Died: 6 June 2015 (aged 88); Dobřichovice, Czech Republic
- Occupations: Writer; Author; Journalist
- Spouse: Marie Vaculíková
- Partner: Lenka Procházková
- Children: Martin Vaculík; Ondřej Vaculík; Jan Vaculík; Cecílie Jílková; Josef Vaculík
- Writing career
- Notable works: Two Thousand Words; The Guinea Pigs

Ludvík Vaculík [ˈludviːk ˈvatsuˌliːk] (23 July 1926 – 6 June 2015) was a Czech writer and journalist. He was born in Brumov, Moravian Wallachia. A prominent samizdat writer, he was best known as the author of the "Two Thousand Words" manifesto of June 1968.

== Pre-1968 ==
President of Czechoslovakia and Communist Party leader Antonín Novotný and his fellow conservatives had begun taking a more repressive approach toward intellectuals and writers after the Six-Day War of June 1967. The following month, Vaculík, then still a member of the Communist Party, attended the Fourth Congress of the Union of Writers. Others in attendance included communist party members Pavel Kohout, Ivan Klíma, and Milan Kundera, as well as non-Party member Václav Havel. Vaculík made an inflammatory speech in which he rejected the leading role of the party as unnecessary and criticized it for its restrictive cultural policies and failure to address social issues. Havel recalled the mixed response of the fellow writers to Vaculík's remarks: on the one hand, they were "delighted that someone had spoken the truth… but [their] delight was tempered by doubts about whether direct confrontation on the political level would lead anywhere, and by fears that it could stimulate a counterattack by the power center." Novotný and his supporters did indeed try to bring the writers' union under their control after the congress, but failed. Vaculík's and other writers' speeches at the conference, with their anti-Novotný sentiments, increased the gap between the conservative Novotný supporters and more moderate members of the party leadership, a division that would contribute to Novotný's eventual fall.

== The Prague Spring and the "Two Thousand Words" ==
Vaculík was among the most progressive members of the Communist Party and thereby more radical than Alexander Dubček, who had become Party leader in January 1968. Hence, Vaculík and others generally felt that the reforms of the April Action Programme were the minimum necessary and that they should be quickly and firmly enforced. In hopes of influencing voters in upcoming party congress elections, Vaculík released the manifesto "Two Thousand Words to Workers, Farmers, Scientists, Artists, and Everyone" in several major Prague newspapers, complete with signatures of other public figures. The date was 27 June 1968, the day after preliminary censorship was abolished by the national assembly.

In the "Two Thousand Words," Vaculík asked that the public "demand the resignation of people who have misused their power" by criticism, demonstrations, and strikes. He also expressed concern over the "recent apprehension" regarding the reforms due to "the possibility that foreign forces"—those of the Warsaw Treaty Organization—"may intervene in Czechoslovakia's internal development." If this were to happen, Vaculík argued:

…the only thing we can do is to hold our own and not indulge in any provocation. We can assure our government—with weapons if need be—as long as it does what we give it a mandate to do.

=== Impact of the "Two Thousand Words" ===
Despite the overall moderate tone and Marxist–Leninist orthodoxy, the "Two Thousand Words" called for action on the part of the public in case of military intervention and therefore denied the leading role of the party, as Vaculík's 1967 speech had. It was popular throughout Czechoslovakia with both intellectuals and workers, and its popularity only increased after the party officially condemned it. It also significantly increased the concerns of the Soviet Union. Following the "Two Thousand Words," Leonid Brezhnev's party leadership, seeing a situation similar to that in 1956 Hungary developing, used the term "counterrevolution" to describe the Prague Spring for the first time. If a counterrevolution was taking place (and the Soviet Union was increasingly disposed to categorising the events in Czechoslovakia as such, as other radicals continued to act and Dubček failed to gain their confidence), socialism as the Soviet Union saw it was threatened and invasion by Warsaw Treaty Organisation troops, as occurred 20–21 August 1968, was deemed justified. This policy of the acceptability of using force wherever socialism was thought to be threatened would become known as the Brezhnev Doctrine, and Vaculík's "Two Thousand Words" was an integral step toward this early application of it.

== Vaculík as a dissident ==
After Gustáv Husák came to power in 1969 and censorship increased, Vaculík (now no longer a party member) was part of the circle of dissident writers in Czechoslovakia. In 1973, he started Edice Petlice (The Padlock Editions), a samizdat series that he ran until 1979. Others followed with their own series, despite harassment from the party's secret police. Some samizdat authors, including Vaculík, were also published in the west.

The core of the samizdat authors eventually developed and signed the foundation document of Charter 77; Vaculík attended the second of the planning meetings in December 1976. On 6 January 1977, Vaculík, along with Havel and Pavel Landovský, an actor, attempted to take a copy of the charter to the post office to mail to the Czechoslovak government. Their car was pulled over by the Party secret police, and all three were taken in for interrogation. Other signatories were subsequently subjected to interrogations and searches of their homes, as well.

In late 1978, however, Vaculík published the article "Remarks on Courage", a piece that helped set the tone for criticism of charterists. Of the original signatories, most were from the intelligentsia in Prague and Brno, and Vaculík and others warned against them becoming so isolated that average citizens could no longer relate to Charter 77. His criticism worked against a mythologisation of the Charter and ensured continued discussion of its position and role.

== After communism ==
Vaculík continued to write; the official ban on his works was lifted in late 1989. He had a weekly column in Lidové noviny that featured feuilletons addressing various Czech political and cultural issues, just as much of his underground work during Communism had.

== Death ==
Vaculík died of natural causes at the age of 88 on 6 June 2015 in Dobřichovice, where he lived by his son.

== Bibliography ==
=== Novels ===
- Rušný dům (1963), autobiographical novel about the author's work as a tutor at a boys' boarding school
- Sekyra (1966). The Axe, trans. Marian Sling (Harper & Row, 1973)
- Morčata (1970). The Guinea Pigs, trans. Kača Poláčková (The Third Press, 1973; Open Letter, 2011)
- Český snář (1980). A Czech Dreambook, trans. Gerald Turner and Jonathan Bolton (Karolinum Press, 2020)
- Milí spolužáci (1995)

=== Compilations in English ===
- A Cup of Coffee with My Interrogator: The Prague Chronicles of Ludvík Vaculík, trans. George Theiner (Readers International, 1987)

=== Essays ===
- 1968: "Two Thousand Words to Workers, Farmers, Scientists, Artists, and Everyone"
- 1983: "On a Plane", trans. Alex Zucker (2018)

== See also ==
- Charter 77
- Libri Prohibiti
- Normalization (Czechoslovakia)
- Prague Spring
- Samizdat
