= Aarhus School of Music =

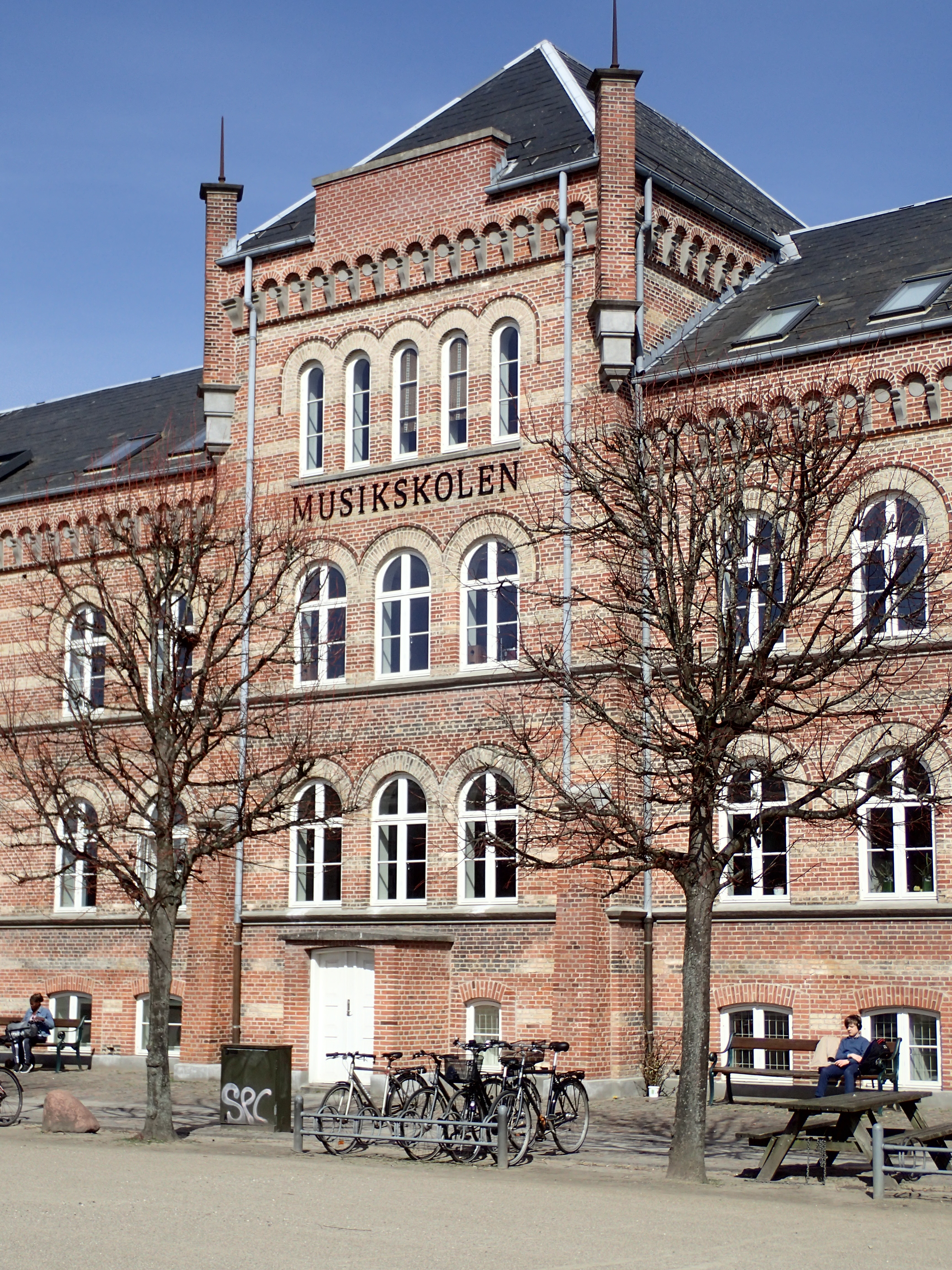
- Aarhus Musikskole, main entrance

Location
- Aarhus; Denmark
- Coordinates: 56.1535°N 10.2009°E

Information
- Opened: 1932
- Faculty: 130
- Enrollment: 3000
- Website: www.aarhusmusikskole.dk

Aarhus School of Music (Aarhus Musikskole) is a municipal music school located in Aarhus, Denmark. The school was founded in 1932 as a private school, but was taken over by Aarhus Municipality in 1977, which has run the school as an unaccredited institution ever since. The school is situated in the officers building of the former Vester Allé Barracks, The school cooperates with the Danish National Opera and the Aarhus Symphony Orchestra and is home to a number of choirs and orchestras.

== History ==
Aarhus School of Music is one of the oldest music schools in Denmark. Originally Aarhus Folkemusikskole the school was founded in 1932 by music teachers and initially offered training for 150 people. In the 1940s opera for children was the most popular discipline but in the 1950s and 1960s the trend shifted towards teaching 3-7-year-old children emphasizing play and creativity. In 1977 the school became owned by Aarhus Municipality and the school embraced modern instruments and genres.

Today the Aarhus School of Music offers training for up to 3000 people annually and is home to many choirs, bands, ensembles and orchestras, including Aarhus Girl's Choir. The school offers training across Aarhus Municipality i.e. elementary schools but is based in the Vester Allé Barracks in Aarhus city centre.
