= The Two Thousand Words =

Czech manifesto

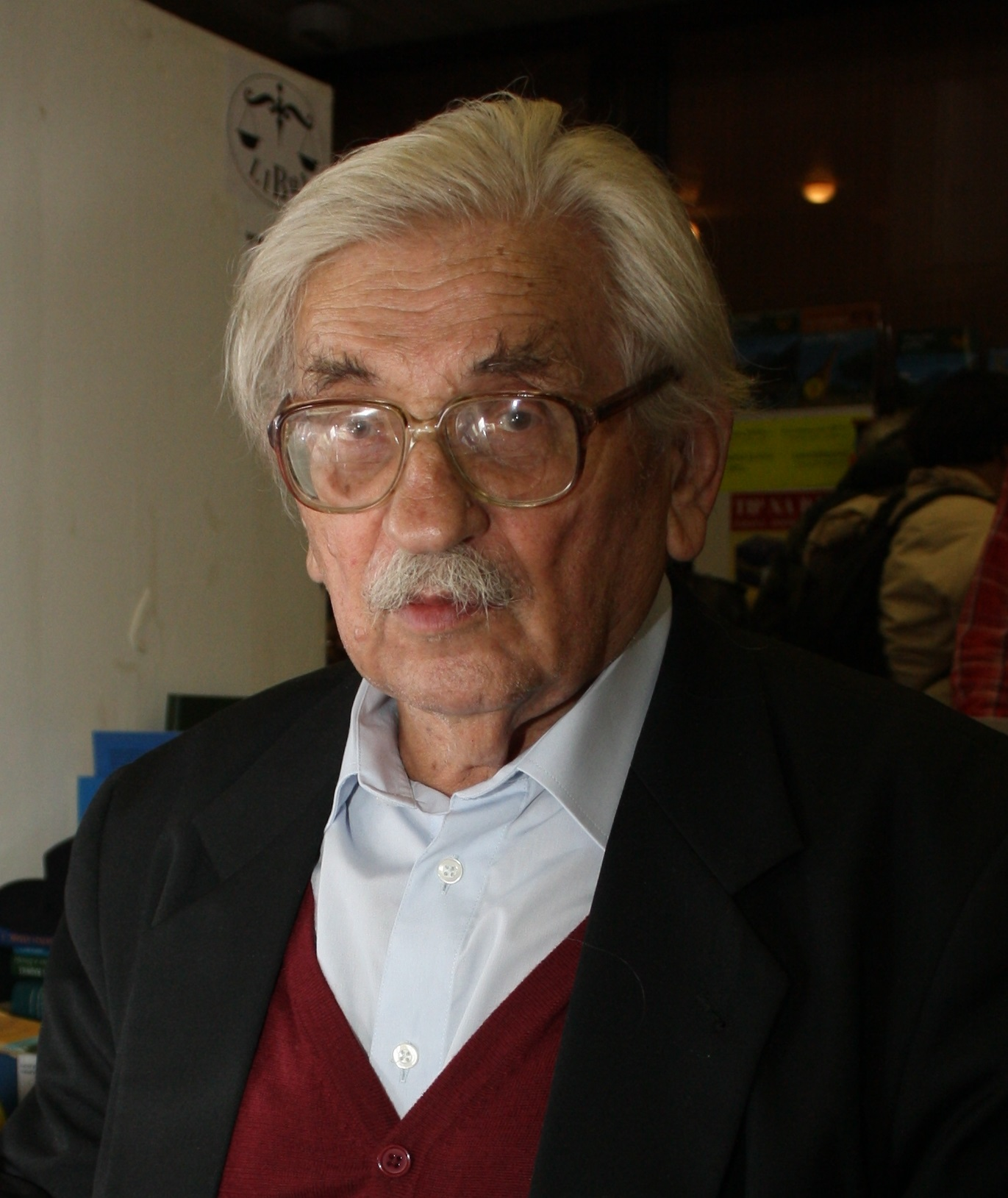
Ludvík Vaculík (2010), the author of the Two Thousand Words manifesto.

"The Two Thousand Words" (full title: 2000 Words to Workers, Farmers, Officials, Scientists, Artists, and Everyone; Czech: Dva tisíce slov, které patří dělníkům, zemědělcům, úředníkům, vědcům, umělcům a všem) is a manifesto written by Czech reformist writer Ludvík Vaculík. It was signed by intellectuals and artists on June 17, 1968, in the midst of the Prague Spring, a period of political liberalization in Czechoslovakia that began in January 1968 with the election of Alexander Dubček and ended with the Soviet invasion in August, followed by the Czechoslovak normalization.

== Content ==
In essence, the "Two Thousand Words" was a call for the people of Czechoslovakia to hold their party accountable to standards of openness—not open revolution. Vaculík began with an assessment of how the nation had declined under the Communist Party of Czechoslovakia (KSČ), painting a picture of moral and economic decay in which workers made no decisions for themselves.

"Most people, therefore, lost interest in public affairs; they worried only about themselves and about their money. Moreover, as a result of these bad conditions, now one cannot even rely on money. Relationships between people were harmed, and they didn’t enjoy working anymore. To sum up, the country reached a point where its spiritual health and character were both ruined."

He gave credit to those "democratically-minded" members of the KSČ who had agitated for change in a stagnant era, saying that it had been possible to air antagonistic ideas only from inside the party structure. These ideas, he says, do not gain their power from being new, but rather weak party leaders and widespread inequality and poverty, which allowed a larger slice of society to realize their position.

Rather than overturning the party, Vaculík prescribed that reformers support its progressive wing, which possessed "well-constructed organizations ... experienced officials ... [and] the decisive levers and buttons." In a time of change, he said, the people should demand transparency in economic management and elect "capable and honest people" to be their representatives, as well as use legal and peaceful protests to bring down corrupt officials. He recognized the importance of a free press, and called for newspapers in the thrall of the party to be turned back into a "platform for all the positive forces."

The statement would later be condemned by the Soviets for challenging the leading role of the Soviet Union. Vaculík mentions the USSR only obliquely, referring to "foreign forces", and advising a gradual and moderate progression towards parity: "We can ensure equal relations only by improving our internal situation and by carrying forward the process of revival so far that one day at elections we will be able to elect statesmen who will have enough courage, honor, and political talent to establish and maintain such relations." Overall, Vaculík called for the reinvention of socialism from within, through rigorous oversight by a newly empowered and unified population.

== Backlash ==
Although the document did energize and inspire progressives at the lower levels of the party, it also had a tremendously polarizing effect, serving as the pretext for a conservative riposte that would get Vaculík banned from the party. The presidium went into immediate emergency session, which only served to increase the statement’s support at home. Government leaders quickly denounced the statement, and even Dubcek addressed the nation on television a few days after its publication calling for national unity. Two weeks later, I. Aleksandrov condemned the "Two Thousand Words" in the Moscow journal Pravda as "a sort of platform representing the forces in Czechoslovakia and abroad that are endeavoring, under the guise of talk about 'liberalization,' 'democratization,' etc., to strike out the entire history of Czechoslovakia since 1948 and the socialist achievements of the Czechoslovak working people, to discredit the Czechoslovak Communist Party and its leading role, to undermine the friendship between the Czechoslovak people and the peoples of fraternal socialist states and to pave the way for counterrevolution."

The statement did not significantly instigate local action, and weakened Czech diplomats like the moderate Josef Smrkovský in his efforts to placate the Soviets, who were disturbed by the pace of reform in Czechoslovakia. Ultimately, it was one of the building blocks that led to the invasion of Czechoslovakia in mid-August.
