= Aarhus Festuge =

Art and culture festival

Coordinates: 56°09′12″N 10°12′03″E

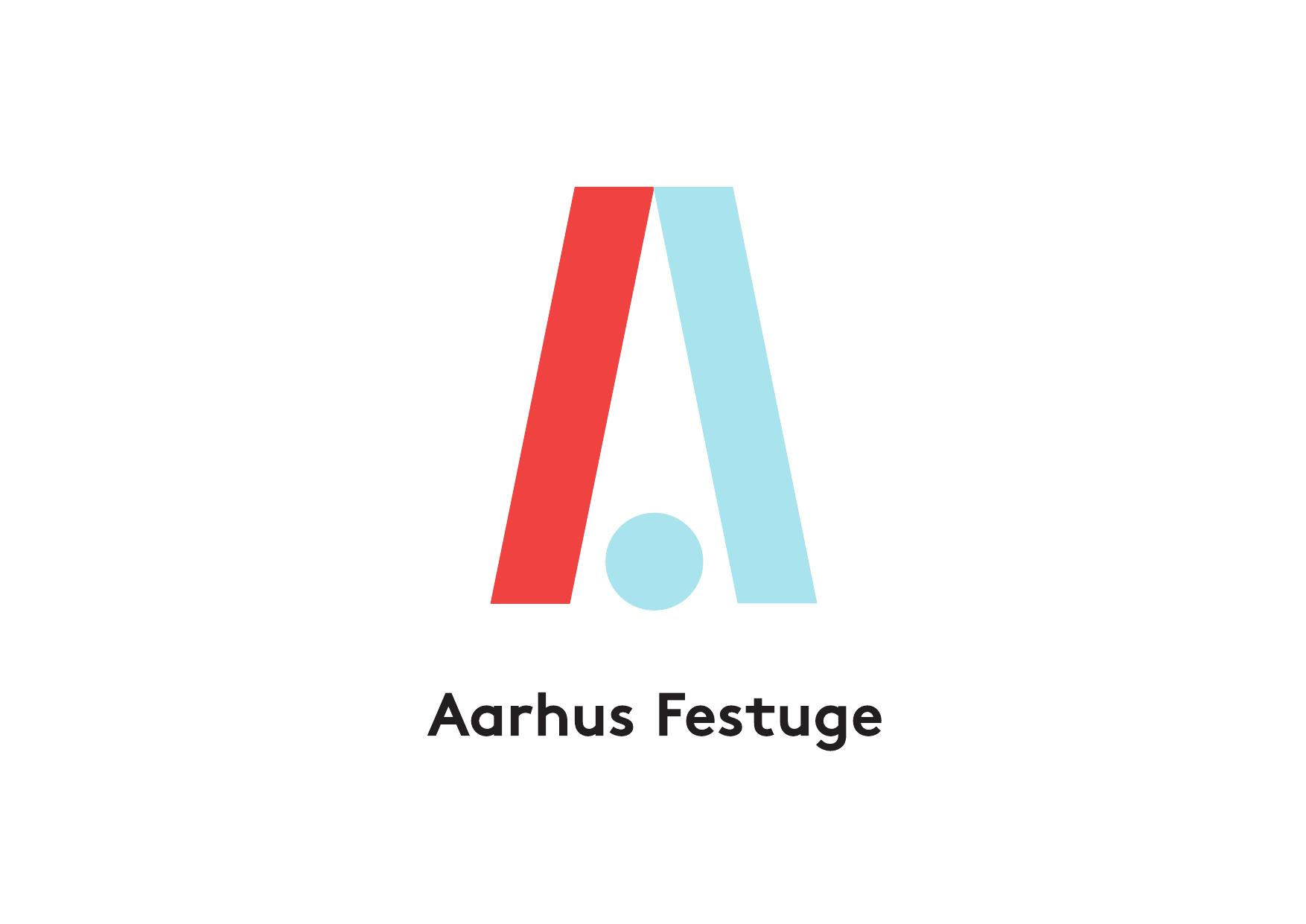
- Aarhus Festuge logo
- Genre: Culture and arts
- Locations: Aarhus, Denmark
- Founded: 1965
- Website: Aarhus Festuge
- Media related to Aarhus Festuge at Wikimedia Commons

Aarhus Festuge (Aarhus Festival) is a 10-day arts and culture festival in the city of Aarhus, Denmark. It takes place every year in late August to early September (in weeks 35–36).

The first Aarhus Festival happened in 1965, after being established the year before as an experiment to bring together and activate the city's institutions and associations. The overarching purpose was to present Aarhus’ cultural profile, based on the political idea that art, culture and community are essential for a flourishing city. It was considered a great success, and the festival has been an annual tradition ever since.

From 1965, Aarhus Festuge has evolved to become more than just a local event. Nowadays, it has a more international focus, and over the years, artists from all across the world have been part of the festivities.

== Description ==
With local and international artists, and events for all age groups, Aarhus Festival has grown to encompass around 1,000 events in 10 days. That makes it one of the largest cultural events in Northern Europe. The happenings spans a broad range of cultural genres, such as music, theatre, architecture, food, art installations, talks, and dancing, as well as general entertainment.

About one third of the events are planned and arranged by the Festival's head office, while the remaining two thirds are organised by private or external actors in the city. Thereby, Aarhus Festival creates a platform for creativity, development and cooperation between the city's cultural actors, businesses, restaurants, venues, and associations.

== History ==
Aarhus Festuge was established in 1964, debuted in September 1965, and has since then become one of the largest themed festivals in Northern Europe.

In 2014, Aarhus Festival took place from 29 August to 7 September. It was the festivals' 50th anniversary, and was marked with the theme ‘Same but different’.

== Themes ==
Aarhus Festival always revolves around an overall theme, which is now used for three-year periods. The theme serves as a guideline and an inspiration for the events, and is visible in many aspects of the festival. The annual poster, which is created by a different artist each year, is the visual representation of the theme.

previous themes
Year	Theme in Danish	Theme translated into English
2023 - 2025	Mind the Gap	-
2020 - 2022	In It Together	-
2017 - 2019	Bridging	-
2016	Upside Down	-
2015	Lys mere lys	Light, more light
2014	Same but different	-
2013	Tegn på liv – i en ny virkelighed	Signs of life - in a new reality
2012	Big	-
2011	Skønne Fejl... Og Andre Lykketræf	Lovely Mistakes ... And other strokes of luck
2010	Naboer	Neighbors
2009	Fremtiden er nær!	The future is near!
2008	Åben by	Open city
2007	I bevægelse	In motion
2006	WOMANIA	-
2005	Mit livs eventyr	Fairy tale of my life
2004	Fra Aros med Eros	From Aros with Eros
2003	Images of Asia – Asiatiske forbindelser	Images of Asia – Asian connections
2002	Lusofonia: Kultur fra den portugisisktalende verden	Lusofonia: Culture from the Portuguese speaking world
2001	Global-Lokal	Global-Local
2000	-	-
1999	10 år efter Murens fald	Ten years after fall of the wall
1998	Danske visioner	Danish Visions
1997	Latinamerika	Latin America
1996	Prolog til fremtiden	Prologue to the future
1995	I Østen	In The East
1994	Twist and Shout	-
1993	Grænseløs	Borderless
1992	Det ny Europa	The New Europe
1991	Nordisk Hvælv	Nordic Vault
1990	Et vindue mod øst	A window to the East
1989	Århus Festuges 25-års jubilæum	Aarhus Festuge's 25th anniversary
1988	Verdenstrommer	Drums of the World
1987	Det dansk-franske kulturår	The Danish-French Cultural Year
1986	Afrikansk Kultur	African Culture
1985	Dans nu	Dance now
1984	Århus Festuges 20-års jubilæum	Aarhus Festuge's 20th anniversary
1983	Alsidighed	Versatility
1982	Musikhuset	The Music House
1981	Rytmisk musik	Rhythmic music
1980	Idræt i centrum	Sports in highlight
1979	Dans i centrum	Dance in highlight

== Gallery ==
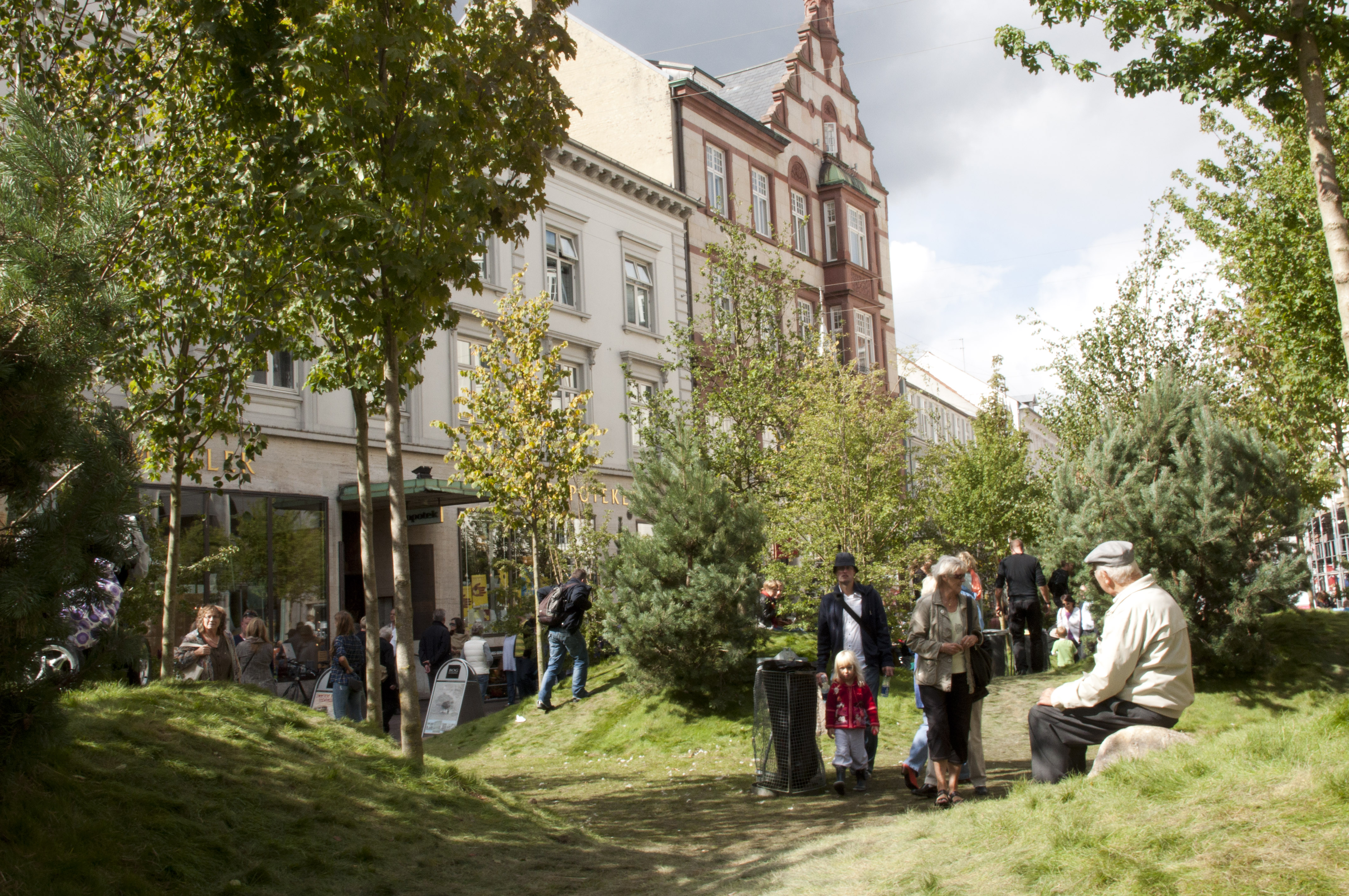
The city-scape is temporarily refurnished. Here, trees on central town squares.

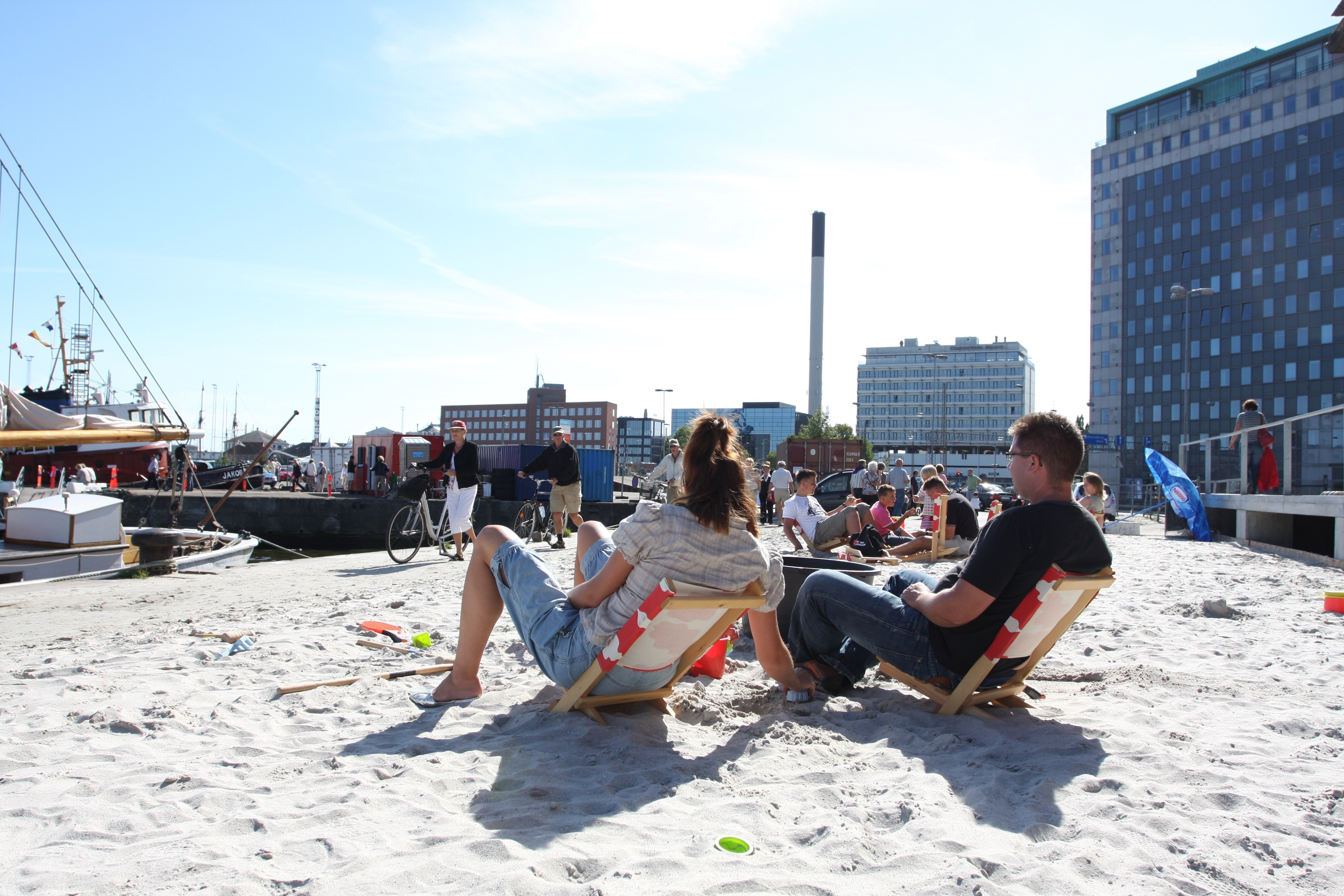
Sandy beaches on the inner harbour front.

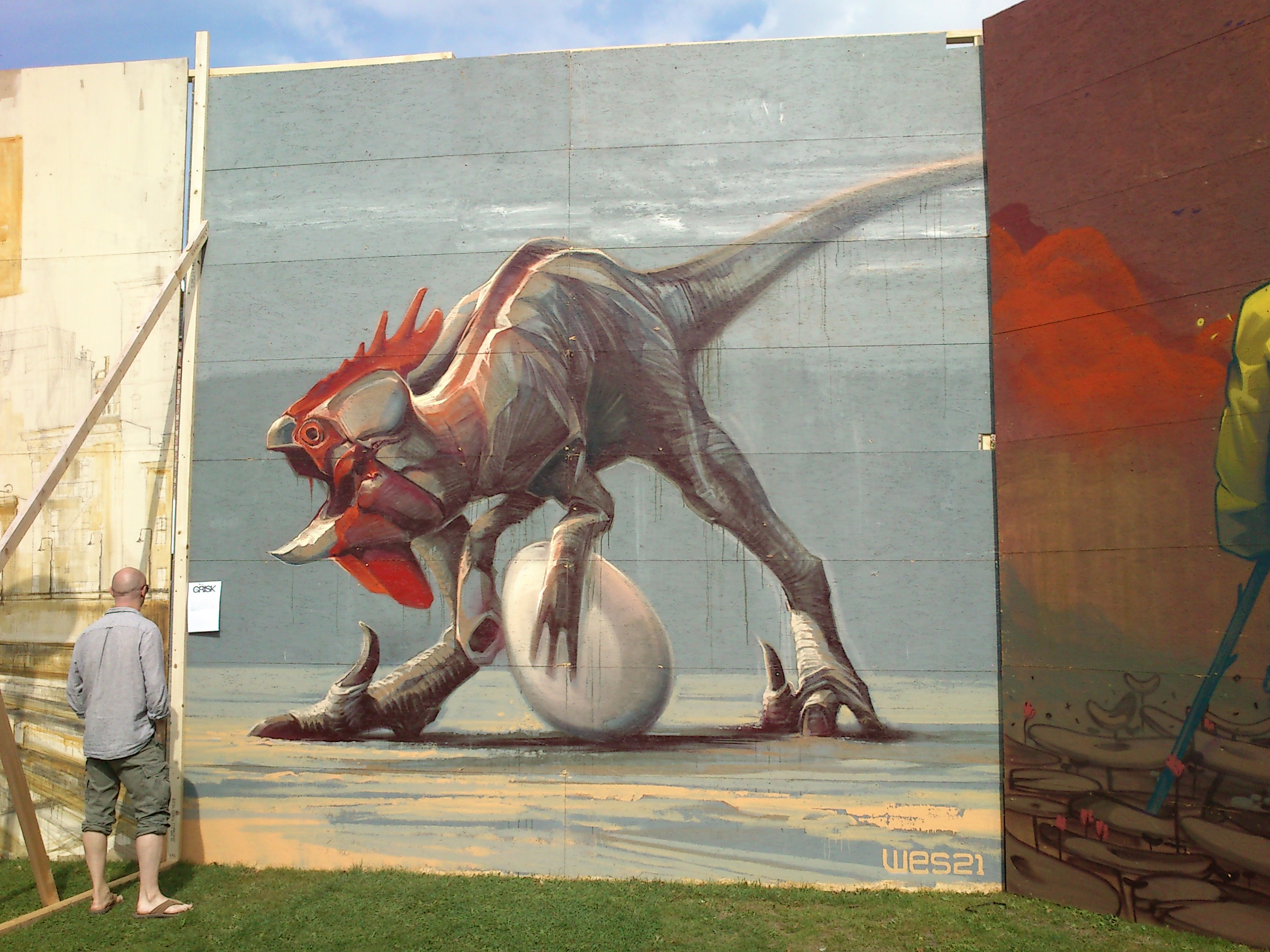
Visual art (Aarhus Streetart Festival)

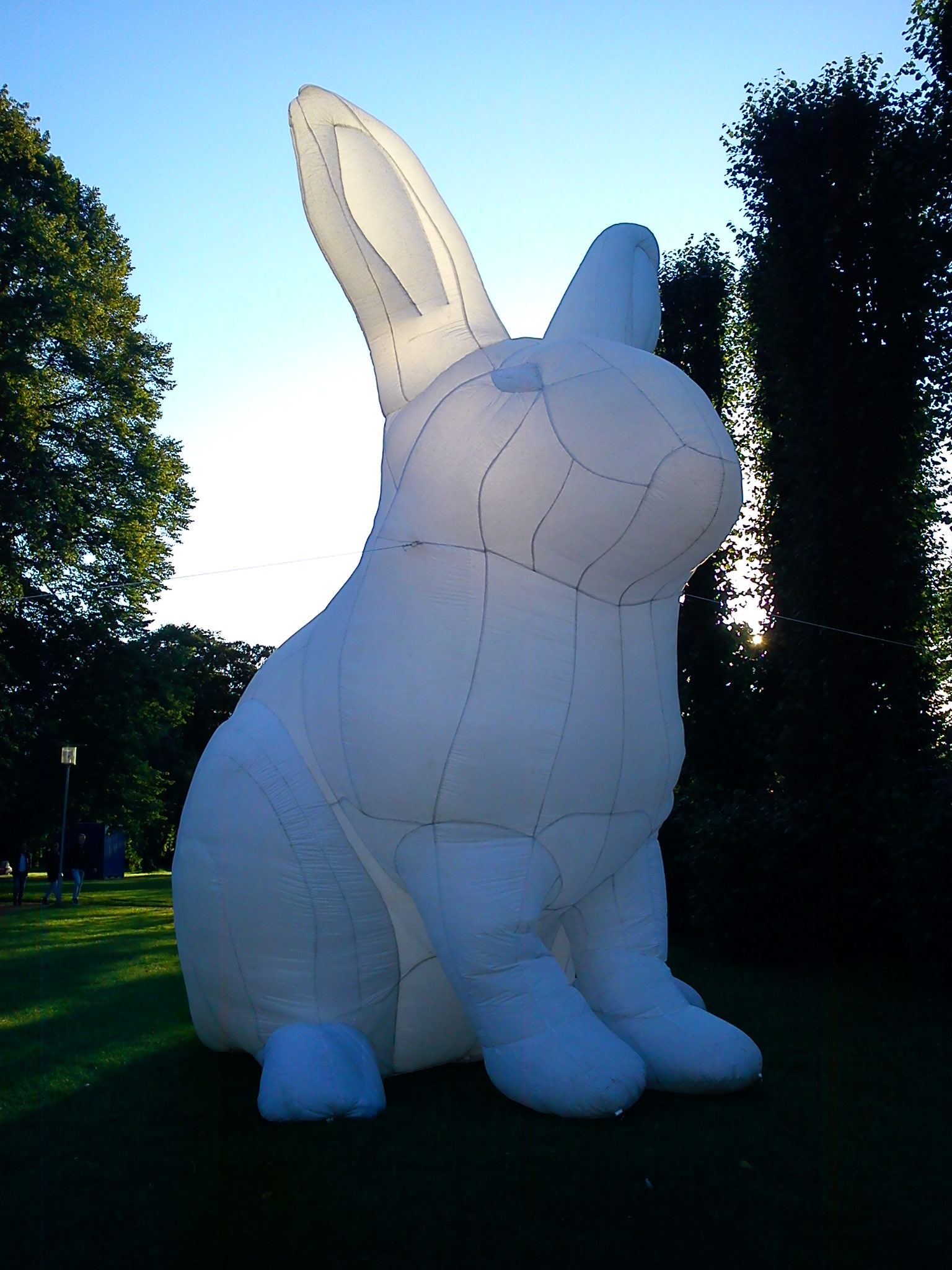
Sculptural decorations around town.

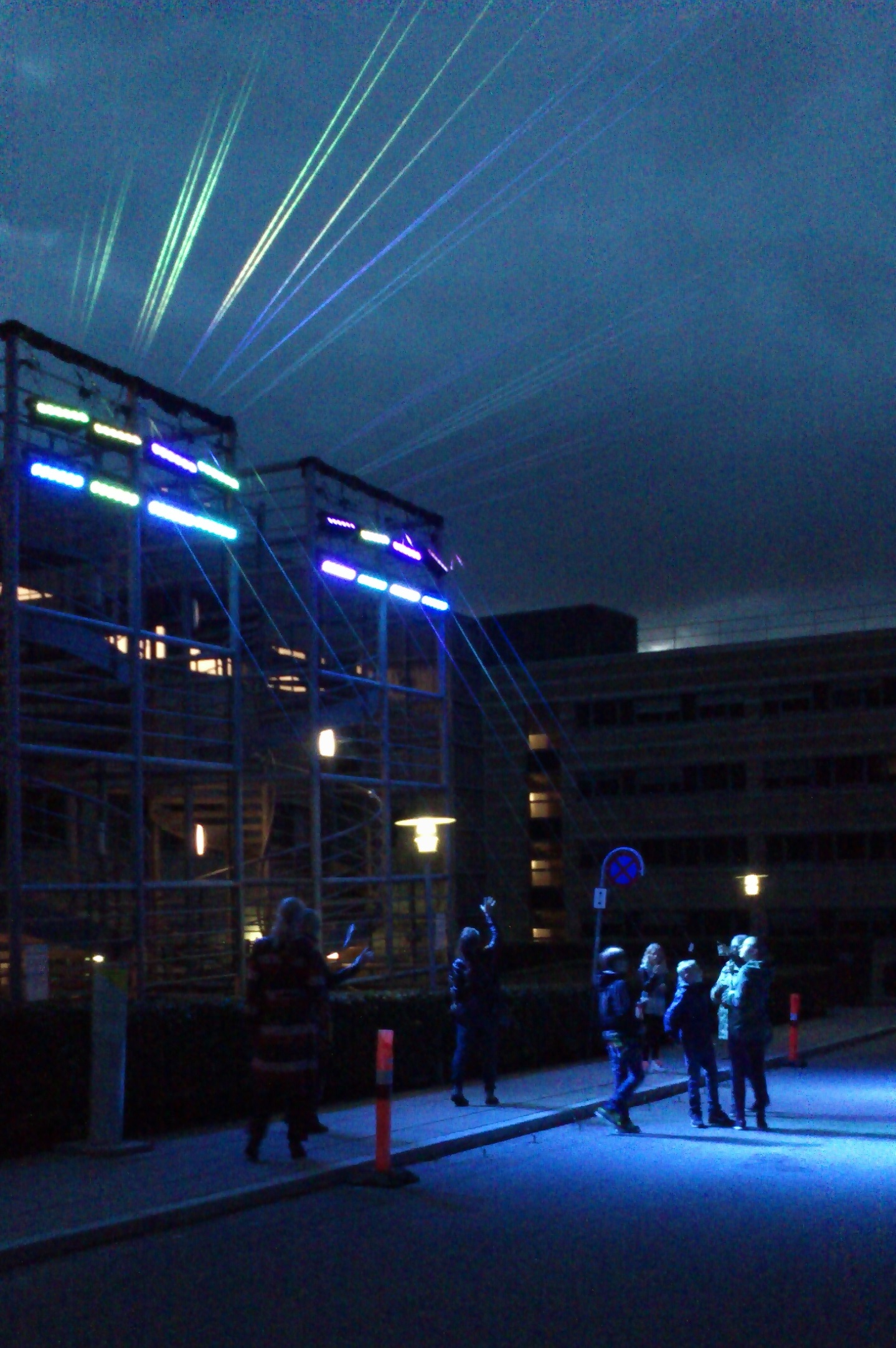
Interactive light and sound installation.
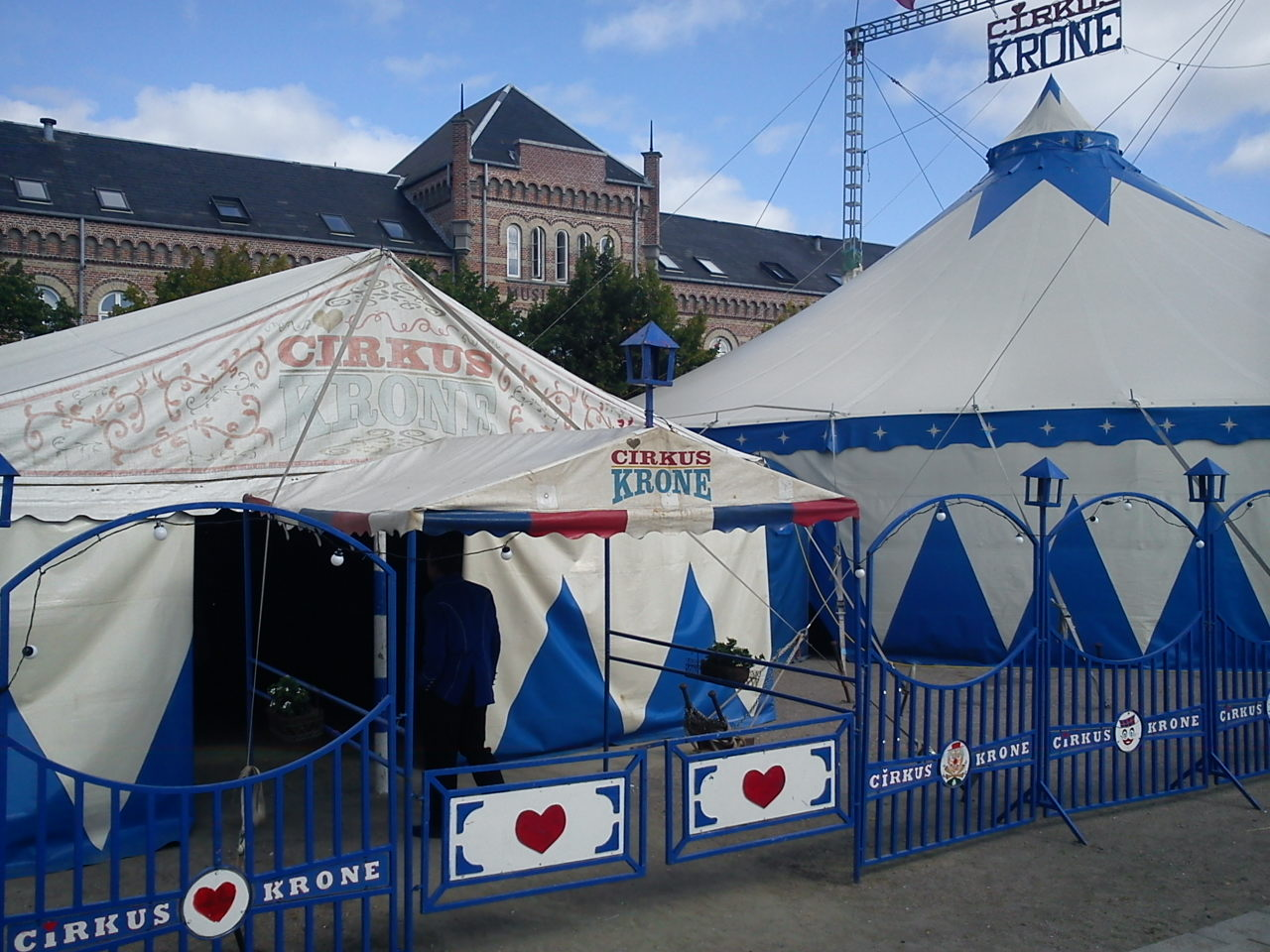
Circus in the town center.

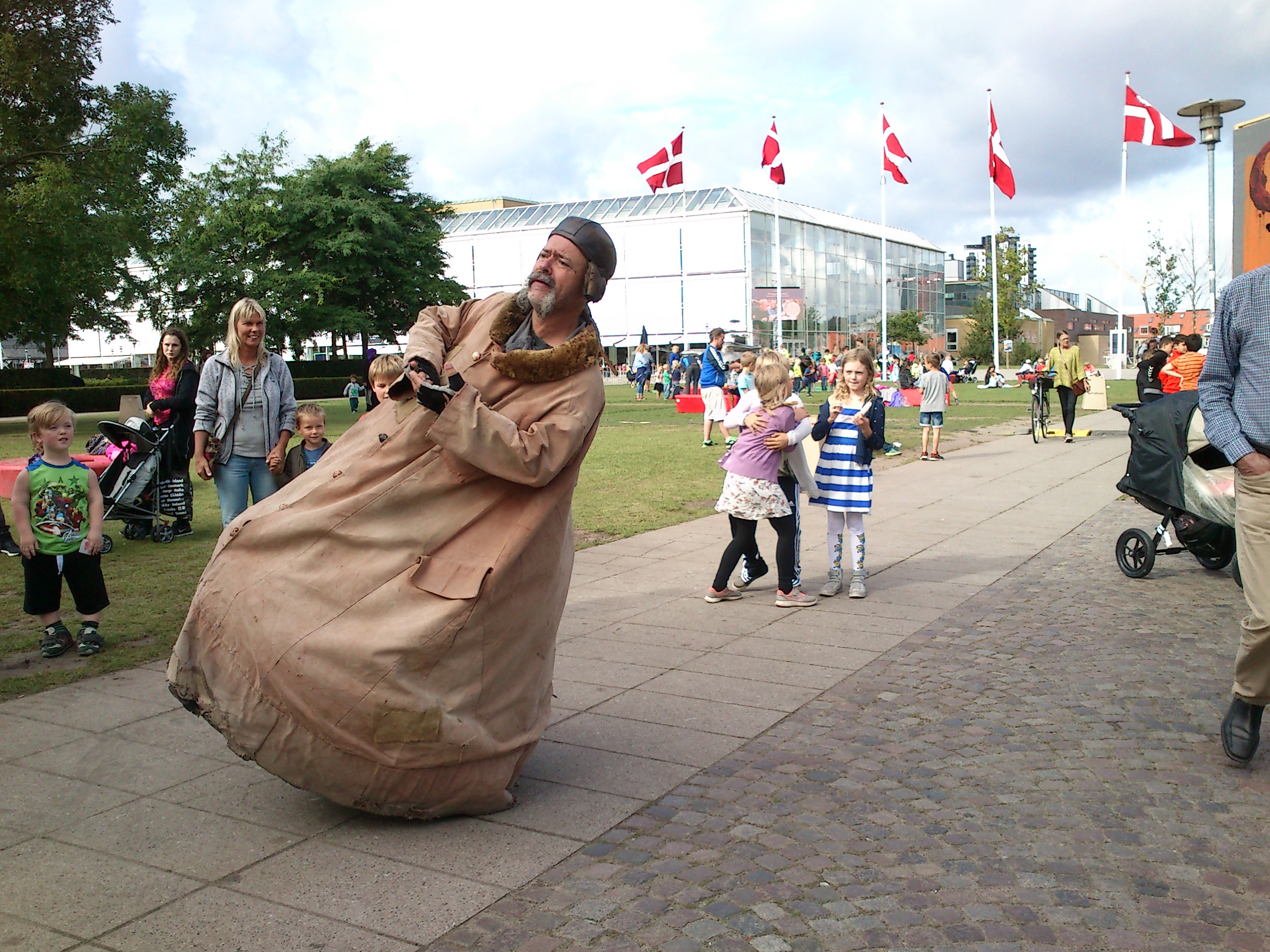
Street performances

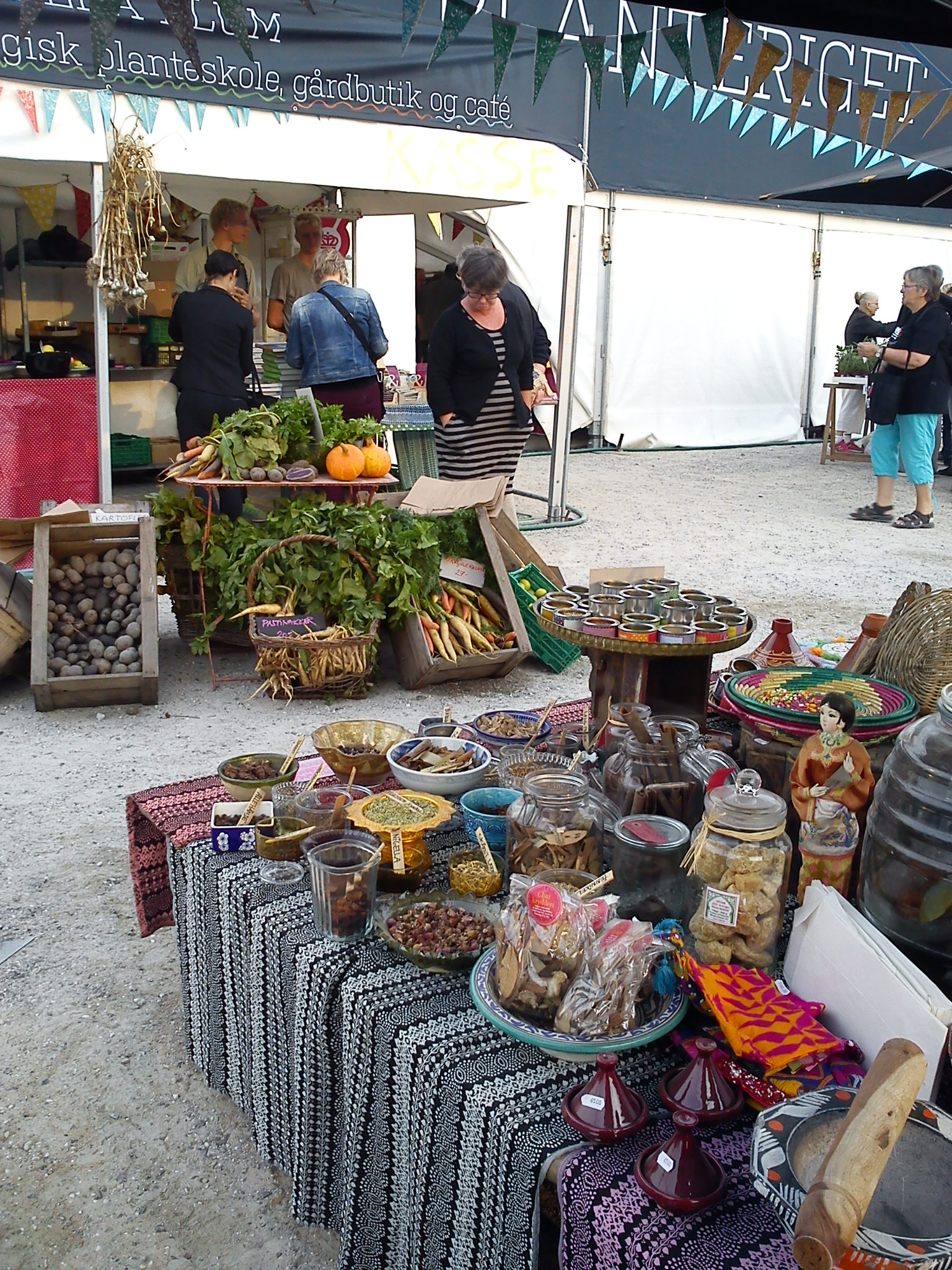
Several festivals within the festival. Scene from Food Festival.

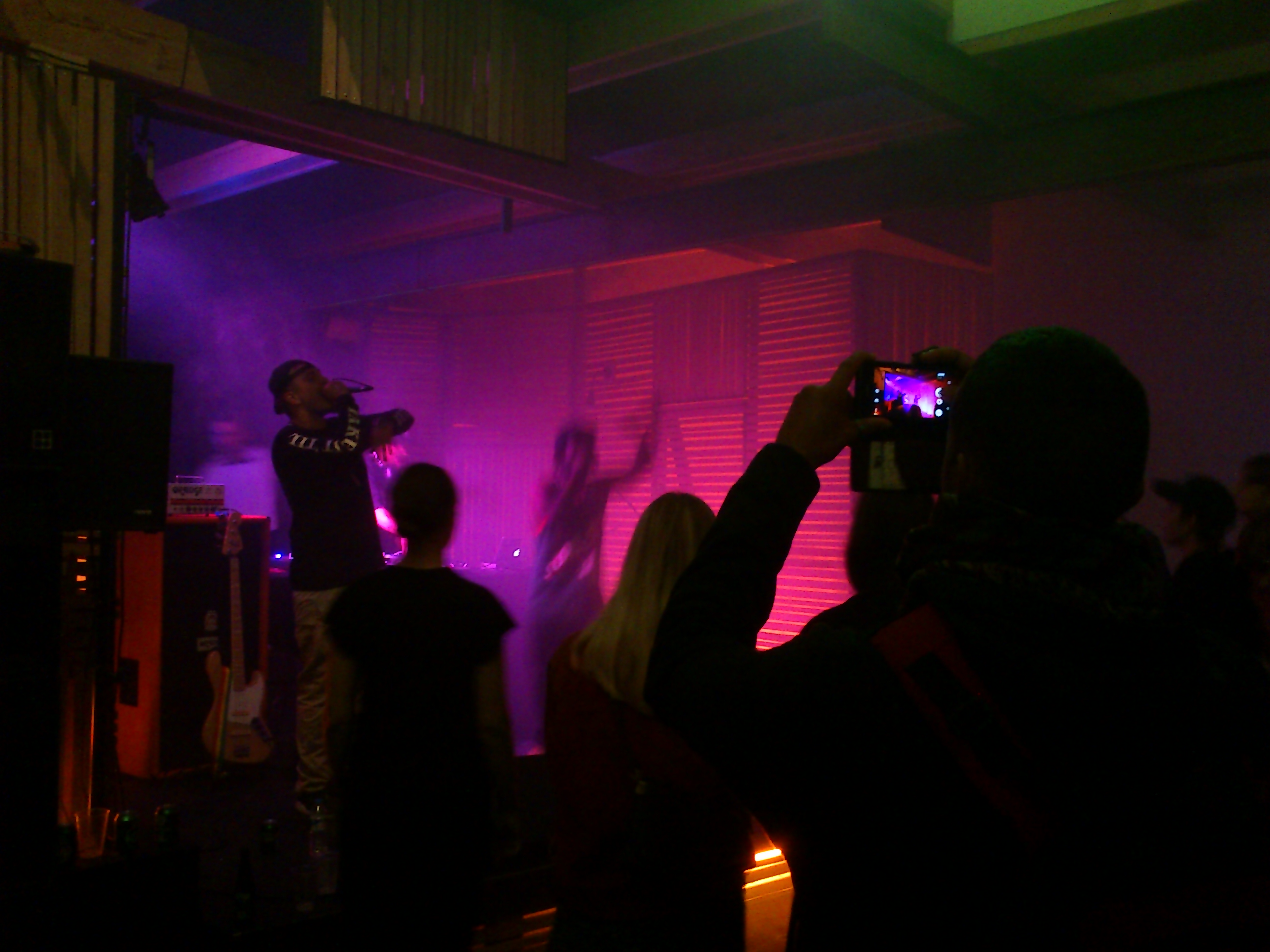
Inversus Festival, a music festival geared towards young people primarily.

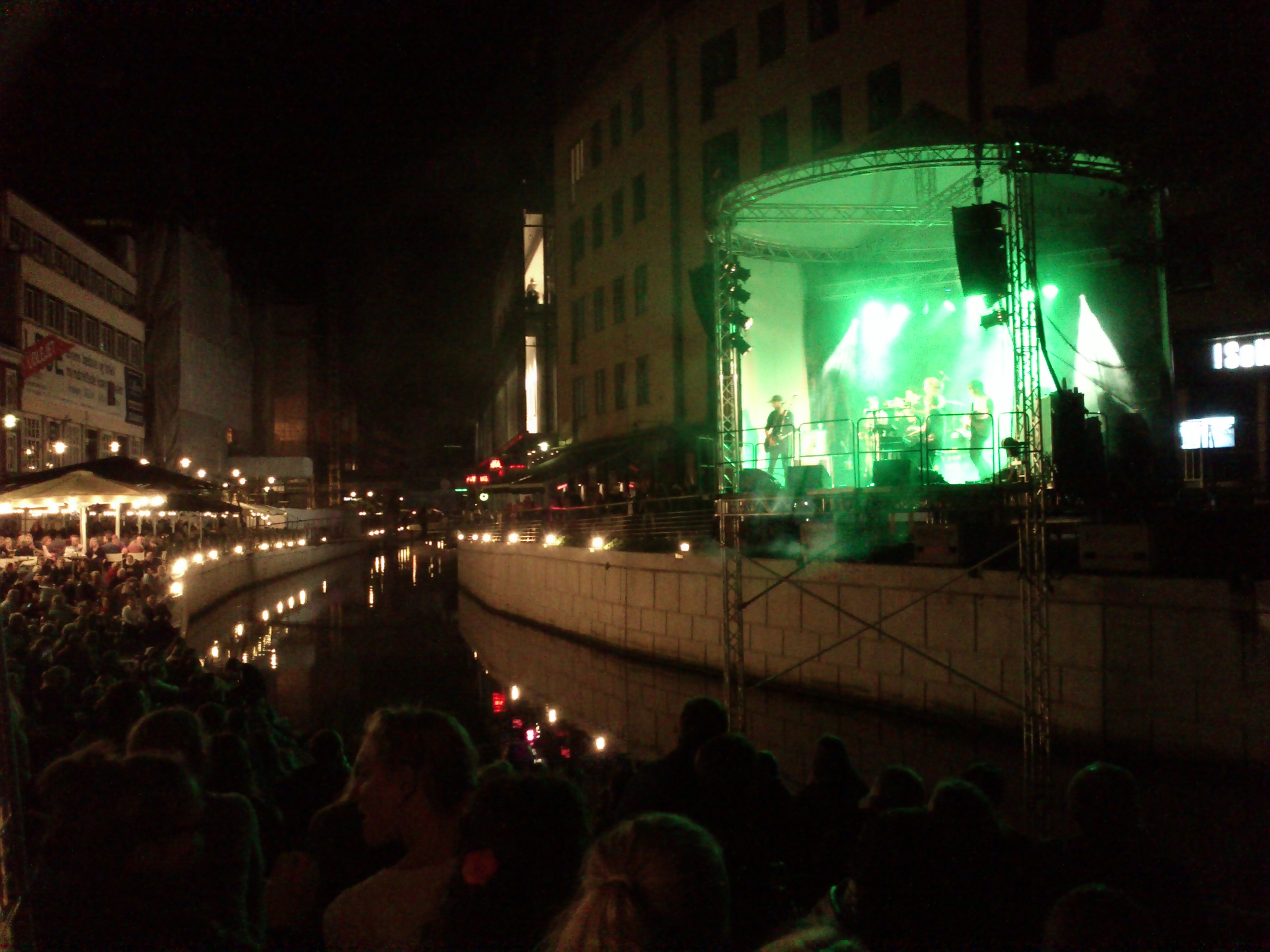
Several music scenes are set up around town. Understrøm Festival.

== Nearby cities ==
Similar cultural festivals are simultaneously held in some nearby cities. "Randers Ugen" has been celebrated in Randers since 1976 and "Trekantsområdets Festuge" since 2014 in the cities of Vejle, Fredericia and Kolding and surrounding smaller towns, collectively known as the Triangle Region.
