= Jan Procházka (writer) =

Czech screenwriter (1929–1971)

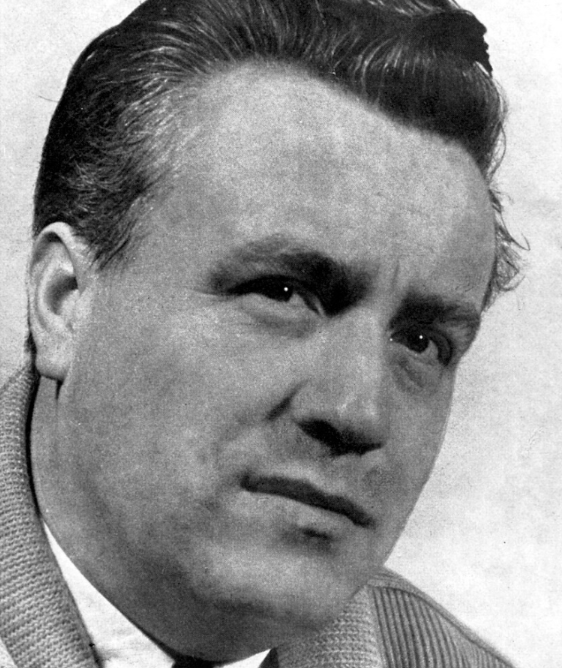
- Born: 4 February 1929; Ivančice, Czechoslovakia
- Died: 20 February 1971 (aged 42); Prague, Czechoslovakia
- Occupations: writer, screenwriter, producer
- Spouse: Mahulena Procházková
- Children: Lenka Procházková; Iva Procházková
- Relatives: Cecílie Jílková (granddaughter); Maria Procházková (granddaughter); Josef Vaculík

Jan Procházka (4 February 1929 – 20 February 1971) was a Czechoslovak writer, screenwriter and producer. He wrote films including Ucho, Fetters, Slasti Otce vlasti and On the Comet. Procházka was also involved in films such as A Report on the Party and the Guests and Diamonds of the Night.

== Biography ==
Jan Procházka came from a peasant family. He studied at the Higher Agricultural School in Olomouc and after graduation, he began working in the border areas as the head of the State Youth Farm on the Stavovské panství Bruntál (1945–1949). He processed his experiences from this time in his book "Green Horizons". A year later, he moved to Prague, where he organized youth brigades to the border regions as part of the Czechoslovak Union of Youth. The environment of the border areas also inspired his most famous novel, "Shootout".

As a member of the Czechoslovak Youth Union apparatus, he first worked in the agricultural department of the regional committee, and shortly thereafter in the Central Committee of the Czechoslovak Union of Youth (1950–1959). In 1956, he wrote his first book. In 1959, he became a dramaturge and screenwriter at the Barrandov Film Studio. In the late 1950s and early 1960s, he was a member of the Central Committee of the Czechoslovak Union of Youth. He assisted Bohumil Hrabal, Arnošt Lustig, and was behind the creation of films such as "Diamonds of the Night" or "Daisies", even though he was not close to the poetics of Vera Chytilová, but "as an artist, she has the right to speak," he said. "He was the protector of our generation," summed up one of Procházka's roles at the time, director Jan Němec.

After the Soviet-led invasion of August 1968, Procházka was declared a persona non grata. The secret police had secretly recorded his private conversations, which were then broadcast on state television to discredit him. He was expelled from the Communist Party and banned from publishing. The psychological pressure contributed to the rapid deterioration of his health, and he died of cancer on 20 February 1971 in Prague, aged 42.

== Bibliography ==
- Ear, Karolinum Press, 2022. ISBN 978-80-246-5135-4.

== Honours ==
- Medal of Merit (1999)
