= Žena za pultem =

Czechoslovak television series

- Genre: Drama
- Written by: Jaroslav Dietl
- Directed by: Jaroslav Dudek
- Country of origin: Czechoslovakia
- No. of episodes: 12

Production
- Running time: 55 minutes

Original release
- Release: 1977 – 1978

Žena za pultem (the Woman Behind the Counter in English) was a Czechoslovak television programme which was first broadcast in 1977. The programme was directed by Jaroslav Dietl. The programme was noted for an erotic scene, which received attention from the ruling Communist Party of Czechoslovakia.

== Cast ==
- Jiřina Švorcová as Anna Holubová (12 episodes, 1978)
- Vladimír Menšík as Karas (12 episodes, 1978)
- Petr Haničinec as Karel Broz (6 episodes, 1978)
- Jana Boušková as Micheala Holubová - Anna's daughter (5 episodes, 1978)
- Hana Maciuchová as Oli Škarapesová (5 episodes, 1978)
- Josef Langmiler as Jiří Holub
- Dana Medřická as Anna Mother
- Jan Potměšil as Petr Holub (Anna's son)
- Zdeněk Řehoř as Deputy Vilímek
- Vladimír Hlavatý as warehouseman Dominik
- Jaromír Hanzlík as warehouseman Oskar
- Lenka Termerová as stutters Jiřinka from vegetables
- Marie Motlová as gran Kubánková of handling bottles
- Daniela Kolářová as cashier Soňa
- Božena Böhmová as cashier Mlynářová
- Karolina Slunéčková as saleswoman Zdena Klalášková
- Simona Stašová as apprentice Zuzana
- Kateřina Burianová as butcher Lada
- Blažena Holišová as saleswoman from vegetables
- Slávka Budínová as Vilímek wife
- Soběslav Sejk as Karas friend
- Josef Bláha as Anna's Neighbour
- Růžena Merunková as Anna's Neighbour
- Josef Somr as Kalášek
- Alois Švehlík as taxi driver
- Bedřich Prokoš as father of Karel Brož
- Bohuš Záhorský
- Věra Kubánková as Karas Wife
- Petr Svojtka as Karas son
- Jiřina Petrovická as Anna's daughter-in-law
- Josef Vinklář as Anna's son-in-law
- Alena Vránová as daughter (-)
- Jiří Hrzán as Olina known
- Eduard Cupák as Olina husband
- Jiří Mikota
- Ludmila Roubíková
- Jiří Lábus
- Otakar Brousek mladší
- Darja Hajská
- Ladislav Frej
- Ema Skálová
- Jaroslava Brousková
- Eva Klepáčová
- Stella Zázvorková
- Vladimír Dvořák
- Věra Budilová
- Jindřich Hinke
- Jana Břežková
- Marta Kučírková
- Růžena Lysenková
- Jiřina Krejčíková
- Eva Svobodová
- František Hanus
- Oldřich Vlach
- Dana Syslová
- Ladislav Křiváček
- Jiří Bruder
- Miroslav Homola
- Zdeněk Ornest
- Věra Tichánková
- Pavla Maršálková
- Mirko Musil
- Martin Štěpánek
- Vítězslav Černý
- Ivo Niederle
- Jaroslav Cmíral
- Jan Cmíral

== Story ==
The story is about Anna Holubová, her daughter Michala, her son Petr and her husbands. The whole story takes place under socialism (in the fifth episode appears 1 May and Gustáv Husák). Furthermore, in the example is mentioned SSM (Socialist Union of Youth). Anna after the divorce starts working in a convenience store, where she meets her future husband while solving problems with stammering Jiřinka warehouse keeper Dominik, or Vilímek who likes her. But children do not like Anna's future husband (Peter Haničinec). Mother (Dana Medřická) again likes the way she moved (she works in the so-called OÚNZ - District Institute of National Health). Eventually, the children of Anna displease their father (Josef Langmiler), and permit Anna to get married again. The entire story takes place in one year (12 parts of 12 months).

== Episodes ==
- 1.Anna nastupuje - Anna gets into work
- 2.Příběh zeleninové Jiřinky - The story of "Vegetable Jiřinka"
- 3.Příběh šéfova zástupce - The story of the deputy of the boss
- 4.Příběh řeznice Lady a skladníka Oskara - The story of the butcher Lada and the warehouseman Oscar
- 5.Příběh starého Dominika - The story of old Dominik
- 6.Vítězství prodavačky Kaláškové - The victory of shop assistant Kalášková
- 7.Příběh učednice Zuzany - The story of the apprentice Zuzana
- 8.Příběh dvou pokladních - The story of two cashiers
- 9.Příběh důchodkyně Kubánkové - The story of the pensioner Kubánková
- 10.Příběh šéfova syna - The story of the boss's son
- 11.Svatba lahůdkové Olinky - The wedding of "Deli Olinka"
- 12.Vánoce Anny Holubové - Anna Holubová's Christmas
