= Provodín =

- Municipality
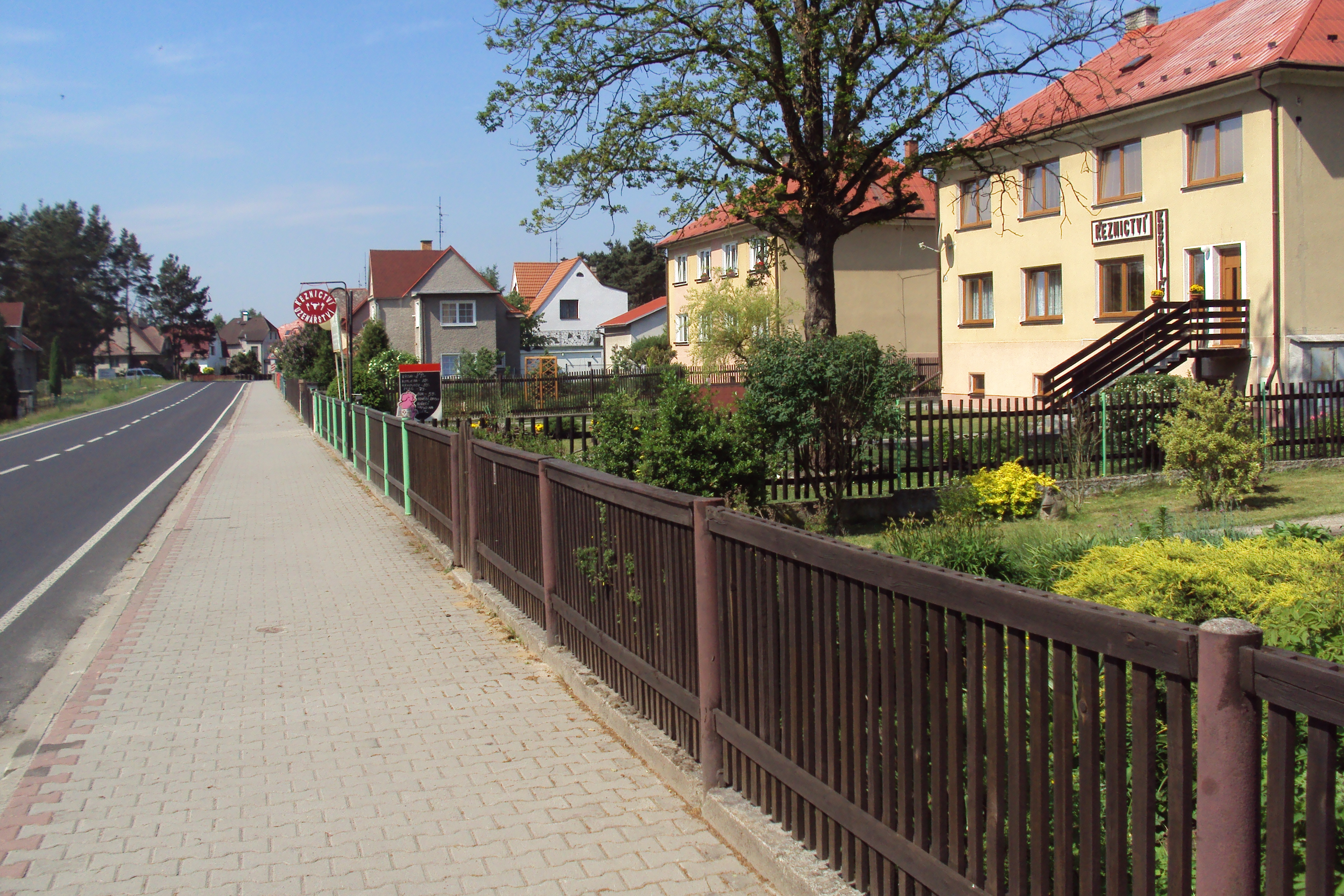
- Main street in Provodín

- Location in the Czech Republic
- Coordinates: 50°37′4″N 14°36′5″E
- Country: Czech Republic
- Region: Liberec
- District: Česká Lípa
- First mentioned: 1376

Area
  - Total: 12.58 km^{2} (4.86 sq mi)
- Elevation: 263 m (863 ft)

Population (2026-01-01)
  - Total: 730
  - Density: 58/km^{2} (150/sq mi)
- Time zone: UTC+1 (CET)
  - Summer (DST): UTC+2 (CEST)
- Postal code: 471 67
- Website: www.obec-provodin.cz

Provodín is a municipality and village in Česká Lípa District in the Liberec Region of the Czech Republic. It has about 700 inhabitants.

== Administrative division ==
Provodín consists of two municipal parts (in brackets population according to the 2021 census):

- Provodín (660)
- Srní u České Lípy (62)

== Etymology ==
The name Provodín is derived from the personal name Provoda, meaning "Provoda's".

== Geography ==
Provodín is located about 8 kilometres (5 mi) southeast of Česká Lípa and 34 km (21 mi) southwest of Liberec. It lies in the Ralsko Uplands. The highest point is the hill Spící panna at 419 m (1,375 ft) above sea level. Most of the municipal territory lies within the Kokořínsko – Máchův kraj Protected Landscape Area. The stream Robečský potok flows along the southern municipal border, just outside the municipality.

== History ==
The first written mention of Provodín is from 1376, when the village belonged to the Jestřebí estate and shared its owners. In 1542, the estate with Provodín was bought by the Lords of Vartenberk and annexed to the Rybnov estate (later known as Nový zámek estate, administered from the Nový zámek Castle in Zahrádky). During the Thirty Years' War, Provodín village was partially burned down and the population decreased. Provodín remained part of the Nový zámek estate until the 20th century.

Until the 19th century, Provodín was an agricultural village. In 1867, a railway was built, and at the end of the 19th century, the village was industrialised when quarries for quartz sand were opened.

== Demographics ==
Historical population

Year	Pop.	±%
1869	520	—
1880	500	−3.8%
1890	489	−2.2%
1900	441	−9.8%
1910	491	+11.3%

Year	Pop.	±%
1921	461	−6.1%
1930	696	+51.0%
1950	435	−37.5%
1961	582	+33.8%
1970	556	−4.5%

Year	Pop.	±%
1980	768	+38.1%
1991	726	−5.5%
2001	688	−5.2%
2011	668	−2.9%
2021	722	+8.1%

Source: Censuses

== Economy ==
Provodín is known for a quartz sand quarry. Quarrying has been taking place since 1913, when the current mining company continued the tradition of an older company.

== Transport ==
Provodín is located on the railway line Mladá Boleslav–Rumburk via Česká Lípa. However, the local train station is called Jestřebí after the neighbouring municipality of Jestřebí. The municipality is also served by the Srní u České Lípy station.

== Sights ==
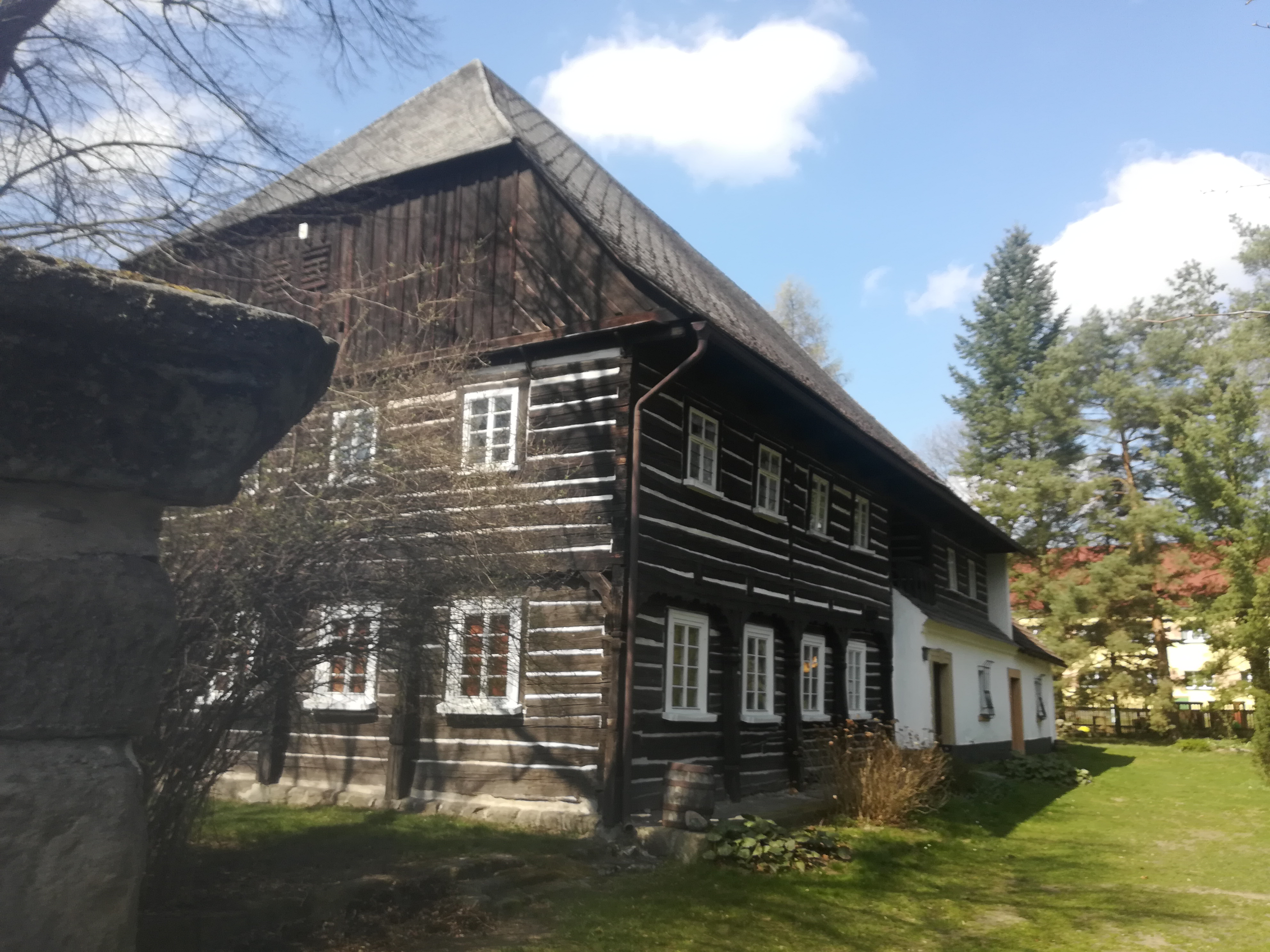
Former inn

Among the protected cultural monuments in the municipality are a column shrine from the year 1700 and three examples of the local vernacular architecture: a former inn from 1766, a homestead from the first third of the 19th century, and a house from the early 19th century.
