= Jan Drda =

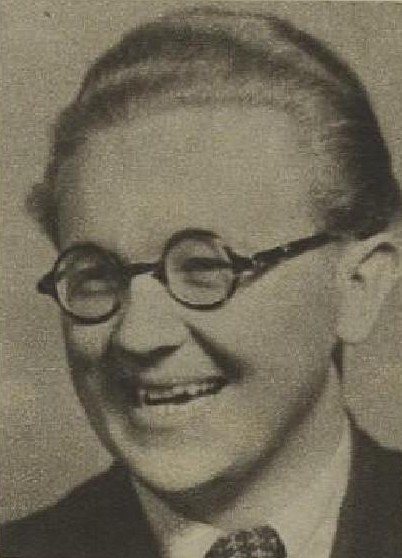
- Born: 4 April 1915; Příbram, Austria-Hungary
- Died: 28 November 1970 (aged 55); Dobříš, Czechoslovakia
- Education: Charles University
- Occupations: writer, journalist, screenwriter, playwright

Jan Drda (4 April 1915 – 28 November 1970) was a Czech journalist, politician, playwright, screenwriter and author of modern fairytales. He was the Czech State Prize Laureate in 1949 and 1953, and was a nominated again for the same prize in 1965.

== Life ==
Jan Drda was born 4 April 1915 in Příbram. He was the son of a laborer and organizational founder. His parents divorced and his father became an alcoholic and abandoned his children. In 1921, Drda's mother died during the birth of his second sibling. Drda and his sister, Marie, were educated by their grandfather. In 1934, Drda graduated from Charles University in Prague with a degree in philosophy.

From a young age, Drda wrote stories and dramatic plays for amateur theatre, and he began contributing to newspapers and magazines from 1932. Between 1937 and 1942, Drda was the editor of Lidové noviny (People's News) to which he contributed feuilletons (English: serials) and reporting.

Drda had been a Communist Party sympathizer since before the Second World War, and supported the blacklisting of some writers who were against Communism. He became a member of the Communist Party of Czechoslovakia in 1945. After February 1948, he held various cultural and political offices, was part of several foreign delegations, including to South America, and was elected to the National Assembly, representing the Prague district, where he remained a member until 1960. In 1955, he received the Order of the Republic. From 1949 to 1956, he was Chairman of the communist-controlled Union of Czechoslovak Writers. Jan Drda and Václav Řezáč, known by the derisive nickname "Drzáč", were against Catholic authors, such as Jakub Deml, Jan Zahradníček, Václav Renč and Bohuslav Reynek.

Drda contributed to many Czechoslovak films, as both a screenwriter and story author. He is credited as a writer on more than 20 films. His screenplay for the 1960 film Higher Principle (Czech: Vyšší princip), based on one of his short stories in Silent Barricade (Czech: Němá barikáda), was awarded the FIPRESCI Prize by the International Federation of Film Critics at the Locarno Festival in Switzerland.

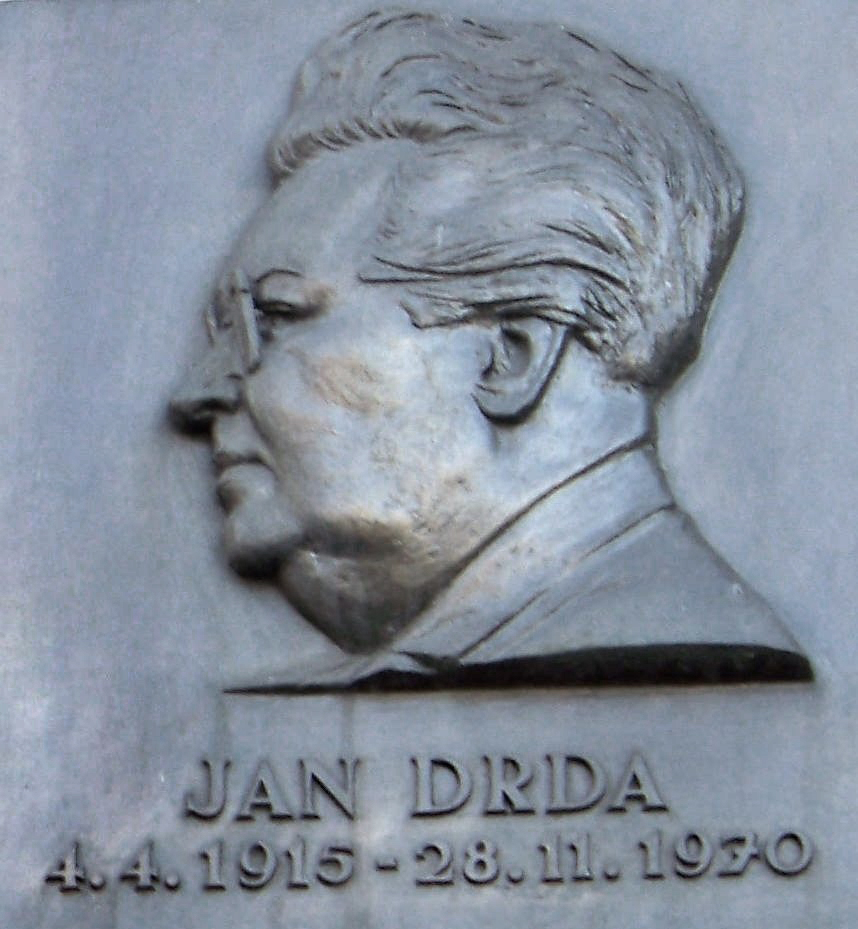
Plaque for Jan Drda in New Town, Prague

In the final years of his life, Drda was the editor-in-chief of Svět práce (English: The World of Work), which he founded in 1968. Drda fell out of favour after condemning the Warsaw Pact invasion of Czechoslovakia and the subsequent occupation, and was expelled from the Communist Party. He died on 28 November 1970 in Dobříš and was buried at a local cemetery. His funeral was attended by about two thousand people.

== Works ==
=== Prose ===
- Městečko na dlani (1940) – depicting the life of people from a small city named Rukapáň (based on the author's home city of Příbram), shortly before World War I.
- Živá voda (1942) – a novel about the life of a rural boy, set in the post-war years.
- Putování Petra Sedmilháře (1943) – a novel about an orphan searching for his unknown father.
- Svět viděný zpomaloučka (1943) – book edition of the committee from his work for Lidové noviny.
- Listy z Norimberka (1946) – a collection of feuilletons about the Nuremberg trials.
- Silent Barricade (Czech: Němá barikáda, 1946) – 14 short stories about Second World War (including Prague uprising and Liberation), first prose account of the Second World War in literature.
- Kuřák dýmky (1948)
- Krásná Tortiz (1952) – a collection of short stories, winner of the state prize for 1953.
- Dětství soudruha Stalina (1953) – a biographical account of Joseph Stalin's life until the age of 16.
- Jednou v Máji (1958) – a youth novel about the defence of the Troja Bridge during the May Uprising.
- České pohádky (1959) – 12 folk tales with illustrations by Josef Lada
- Posvícení v Tramtárii (1972) – three fairy tales, published posthumously as Drda's last work.
- České lidové hádanky v podání Jana Drdy: pro čtenáře od 6 let (1984)
- Nedaleko Rukapáně (1989) – a collection of the author's short stories, published posthumously.
- Milostenky nemilostivé (1995) – a collection of essays written between 1939 and 1940.

=== Drama ===
- Magdalenka (1941) – a one-act comedy
- Jakož i my odpouštíme (1941) – a play about three talks
- Romance o Oldřichu a Boženě (1953) – a comic love story of two mechanical harvesters, Oldřich and Božena.
- Hrátky s čertem (Playing with the Devil, 1946) – a fairy-tale comedy, adapted into a 1956 film directed by Josef Mach starring Josef Bek, with animated decorations by Josef Lada. In 1979, another adaptation of the film was made in Poland, directed by Tadeusz Lis.
- Dalskabáty, hříšná ves aneb Zapomenutý čert (1960) – a comedy about eight pictures, adapted into a television film in 1976 by Jaroslav Novotný.
- Jsou živí, zpívají (1961) – a play about the Prague uprising

=== Scripts and story-writing for film ===
- Druhá směna (1940) – story
- Městečko na dlani (1942) – story, filmed in Ronov nad Doubravou
- Děvčica z Beskyd (1944) – script
- Znamení kotvy (1947) – story and script, a psychological romance
- Silent Barricade (Czech: Němá barikáda, 1949) – story and script; a war film directed by Otakar Vávra, about the battle for Prague at the end of World War II. Drda was awarded the 1949 state prize for the story.
- Playing with the Devil (Czech: Hrátky s čertem, 1956) – story and script
- Dařbuján a Pandrhola (1959) – story and script; 1960 fantasy film directed by Martin Frič
- Higher Principle (Czech: Vyšší princip, 1960) – story and script; drama film based on the eponymous short story from his book Silent Barricade (Czech: Němá barikáda) written in 1946. Set during the Nazi occupation, the story details the relationship between a group of students and their elderly Latin teacher.
- Golden Fern (Czech: Zlaté kapradí, 1963) – story, this fairy tale focuses on the themes of love, loyalty and betrayal.
- Princess Jasnenka and the Flying Shoemaker (Czech: O princezně Jasněnce a létajícím ševci, 1987) – story; a fantasy film directed by Zdeněk Troška and starring Michaela Kuklová and Jan Potměšil, based on a fairy tale by Drda. The film was shot in castles in Bohemia and Moravia. The film was later screened at film festivals and is a staple of national broadcaster TV Nova.
- Nejkrásnější hádanka, 2008 – story

== See also ==
- List of Czech writers
