= Jiřina Švorcová =

Czech actress and activist (1928–2011)

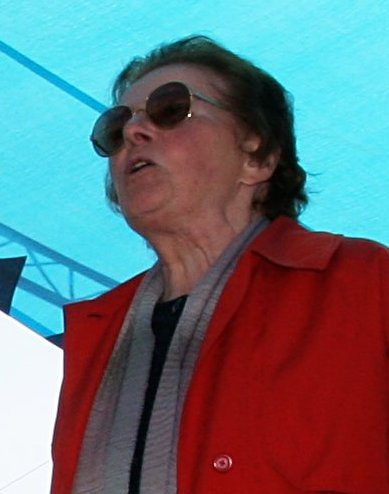
Švorcová in 2006.

Jiřina Švorcová (25 May 1928 – 8 August 2011) was a Czech actress and pro-Communist activist. Her acting career lasted more than forty years, but she largely retired after the 1989 Velvet Revolution and devoted herself to advocacy of the Communist Party.

Švorcová worked in television, theater and film during the Czechoslovak Socialist Republic. She spent more than forty years at the Vinohrady Theatre in Prague. Her best known work came during the 1970s in the Czechoslovak television series, Žena za pultem or A Woman Behind the Counter.

Švorcová was a devote supporter of Communism and a supporter of the former Communist government of Czechoslovakia. In 1976, Švorcová was appointed to the leadership of the Communist Party of Czechoslovakia. She openly condemned the signatories of Charter 77, who included Pavel Kohout and Václav Havel, as "traitors" to Communism and the country. She reiterated her disapproval of Charter 77 in a December 2010 interview with a Czech Radio reporter, "I think it’s wrong when someone finds out that they could not cope with the idea they helped to bring about. There were many, such as Pavel Kohout, who also believed the idea, but then they couldn’t cope with it and so they abandoned it. I think that’s wrong." Švorcová openly described her shock at the violence inflicted on protesters during the Prague Spring and subsequent invasion, but said she could never join the protests saying, "soon as people started to attack the Soviet Union, calling them fascists and so on, I just could not do that. I absolutely couldn’t do that." Due to her communist views, Švorcová's fellow actors at the Vinohrady Theatre, who supported the Velvet Revolution, no longer supported her work at the theater after the dissolution of Czechoslovakia.

Jiřina Švorcová retired from acting after 1989. She spent the rest of her life as an activist for communism and supporter of the former Czechoslovak government. She died in Prague, Czech Republic, on 8 August 2011, at the age of 83.
