= Karolina Slunéčková =

Czech actress (1934–1983)

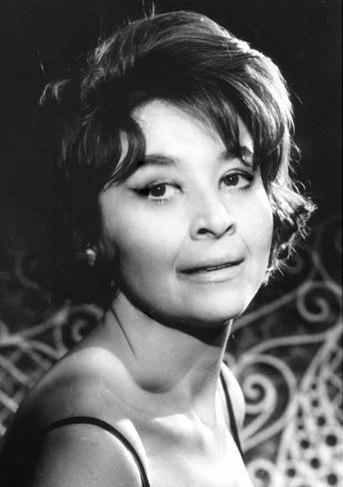
- Born: Karolína Olga Slunéčková; 8 April 1934; Kladno, Czechoslovakia
- Died: 11 June 1983 (aged 49); Prague, Czechoslovakia
- Occupation: actress

Karolina Slunéčková, (born Karolína Olga Slunéčková) (8 April 1934 – 11 June 1983), working under the name Olga Sluníčková, was a Czech actress, and wife of actor Rudolf Vodrážka.

== Life ==
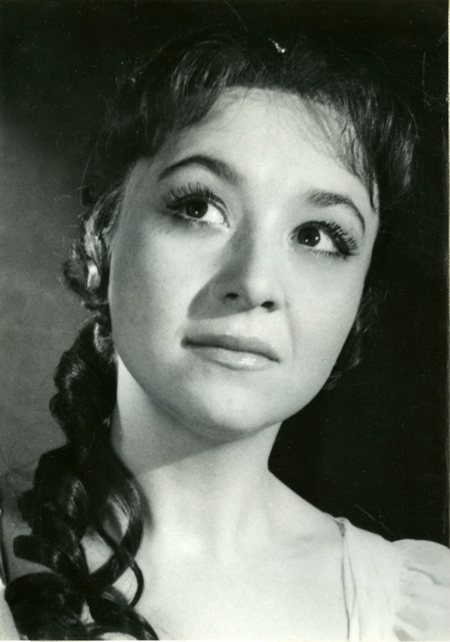
Karolina as Natasha in one of her first roles at the Vinohrady Theatre War and Peace

Karolina Slunéčková was born on 8 April 1934 in Kladno. She moved with her parents to Ústí nad Labem. During the German occupation of the Sudetenland, they were not able to emigrate, so throughout the war they went to the German school.

The essence of the acting was handed over by Professor Věra Petáková. When her love and passion for playing did not calm down during the years and her dream was not able to talk to her, she went to study in České Budějovice, where she studied at Theatre Faculty of the Academy of Performing Arts (DAMU).

In 1956, immediately after the end of DAMU, she got an engagement at the Vinohrady Theatre (at that time the Theatre of the Czechoslovak Army). From the very beginning, she played great roles, such as Natasha in War and Peace, starting with her long monologue to the audience. Each of her roles was always different but completely authentic and distinctive. She played dramatic and comedy. For her role in life we can consider the role of Margaret in Cat on a Hot Tin Roof(1966), where half the performance took place in a black jumpsuit. Only two performances were filmed, namely A Flea in Her Ear (1969) and The Man Who Came to Dinner (1977).

Karolina got the biggest chance in the movie The Orange Boy (1975), where she played the mother of Otakar Brousek Junior's mother.

Karolina met future husband Rudolf Vodrážka while still at school. After a few years they married and in 1960 their son Rudolf was born.

Just a week before her death, she came to the theatre, pleased to work again. Unfortunately she never looked at the stage. She died on 11 June 1983 at age 49.

== Selected theatre roles ==
- 1977 George S. Kaufman, Moss Hart: The Man Who Came to Dinner, Lorraine Sheldonová, Vinohrady Theatre, directed by Stanislav Remunda

== Radio roles ==
- 1964 William Shakespeare: A Midsummer Night's Dream, Czechoslovak Radio, directed by Ludvík Pompe

== Gallery ==
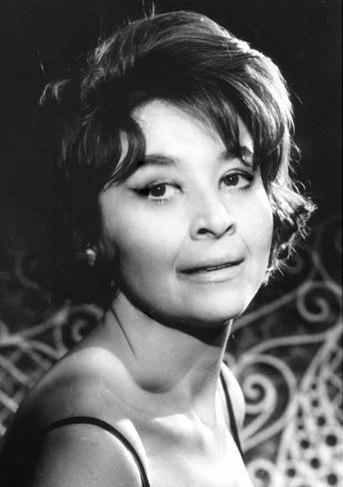
In the play Cat on a Hot Tin Roof (1966)

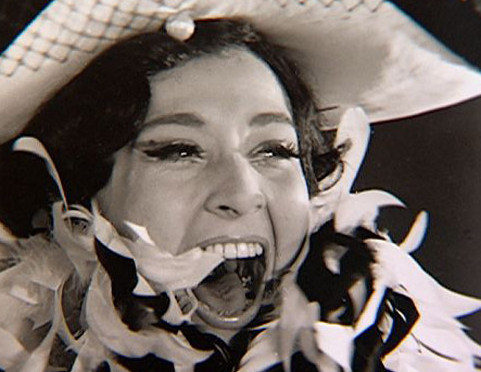
In A Flea in Her Ear (1969)

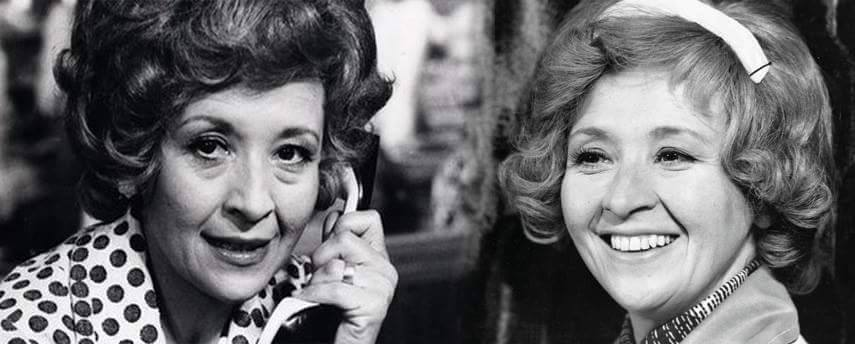
In the television series Žena za pultem (1977)

== Bibliography ==
- Česká divadla: encyklopedie divadelních souborů [Czech Theatre: encyclopedia of theatre ensembles] (in Czech). Prague: Divadelní ústav. 2000. ISBN 8070081074
- Fikejz, Milos (2008). Český film : herci a herečky. III. díl : S–Ž [Czech film: actors and actresses. III. part: S-W .]. Prague: Libri. ISBN 9788072773534
