= Princess Jasnenka and the Flying Shoemaker =

- Directed by: Zdeněk Troška
- Written by: Karel Steigerwald
- Produced by: Jiří Beránek
- Starring: Michaela Kuklová; Jan Potměšil; Lubor Tokoš; Antonie Hegerlíková
- Cinematography: Jaroslav Brabec
- Edited by: Eva Bobková
- Music by: Petr Mandel
- Release date: 1 December 1987
- Running time: 87 minutes
- Country: Czechoslovakia
- Language: Czech

Princess Jasnenka and the Flying Shoemaker (Czech: O princezně Jasněnce a létajícím ševci) is a 1987 Czechoslovak fantasy film directed by Zdeněk Troška and starring Michaela Kuklová and Jan Potměšil. It is based on a fairy tale by Czech writer Jan Drda.

The film was shot in castles in Bohemia and Moravia. It has been screened at film festivals and is considered a classic by the Czech national broadcaster TV Nova.

== Plot ==
Two witches - mother and daughter - have killed the cockerel that usually heralds the dawn. As a result, the Sun doesn't rise. The Good Witch of the Sun seeks justice from the King. He rules in her favour and incurs the wrath of the Evil Witch. She casts a spell forecasting that the King's beautiful daughter, Princess Jasněnka, will marry a shoemaker. Enraged that he will not now be able to marry her off to a man of royal or noble birth, her father, the king, imprisons her in a tower of the castle to ensure she doesn't meet anyone without his knowledge.

However, to make her spell work, the Evil Witch summons an Evil Spirit who tricks Jíra, a shoemaker, to design and make a pair of leather wings that allow him to fly.

The shoemaker wears the wings and flies over fields and forests, finally landing on the castle tower where he meets the imprisoned Princess Jasněnka. The two immediately fall in love, with Jíra and Jasněnka then eloping to the horror of the castle staff who believe that Jíra is Lucifer. Jasněnka and Jíra marry. At first, the two enemy witches (mother and daughter) are delighted, but when they see how happy the young couple are, they are filled with rage and become determined to shatter their happiness.

First, they force Jasněnka to make a mess in the couple's kitchen, expecting Jíra will beat her, but when he arrives he finds it funny. Next, disguised as wealthy ladies, the witch and her daughter visit the market where the Princess sells the shoes made by her beloved husband shoemaker. Casting a spell, they change her into a dove, and imprison her in their dungeon.

The Shoemaker sets off to find her with only one of her slippers to help him. The Good Witch of the Sun comes to his aid, gives him a ring with magical powers, and guides him to the imprisoned Princess. After a spectacular fight with the Evil Spirit, the Princess and the Shoemaker escape.

But the witches had also concocted an evil potion to erase memory that Jasnenka unwittingly gives to Jíra who falls victim to it and sends him to sleep. The Princess is then captured by the King's soldiers, and returned to the castle, where the King makes plans to speedily marry her off to one of three noble princes.

In the nick of time the Shoemaker, who recovered from the effects of the potion and succeeded in remembering his identity, interrupts the wedding and he and the Princess fly off together to live happily ever after.

== Cast ==
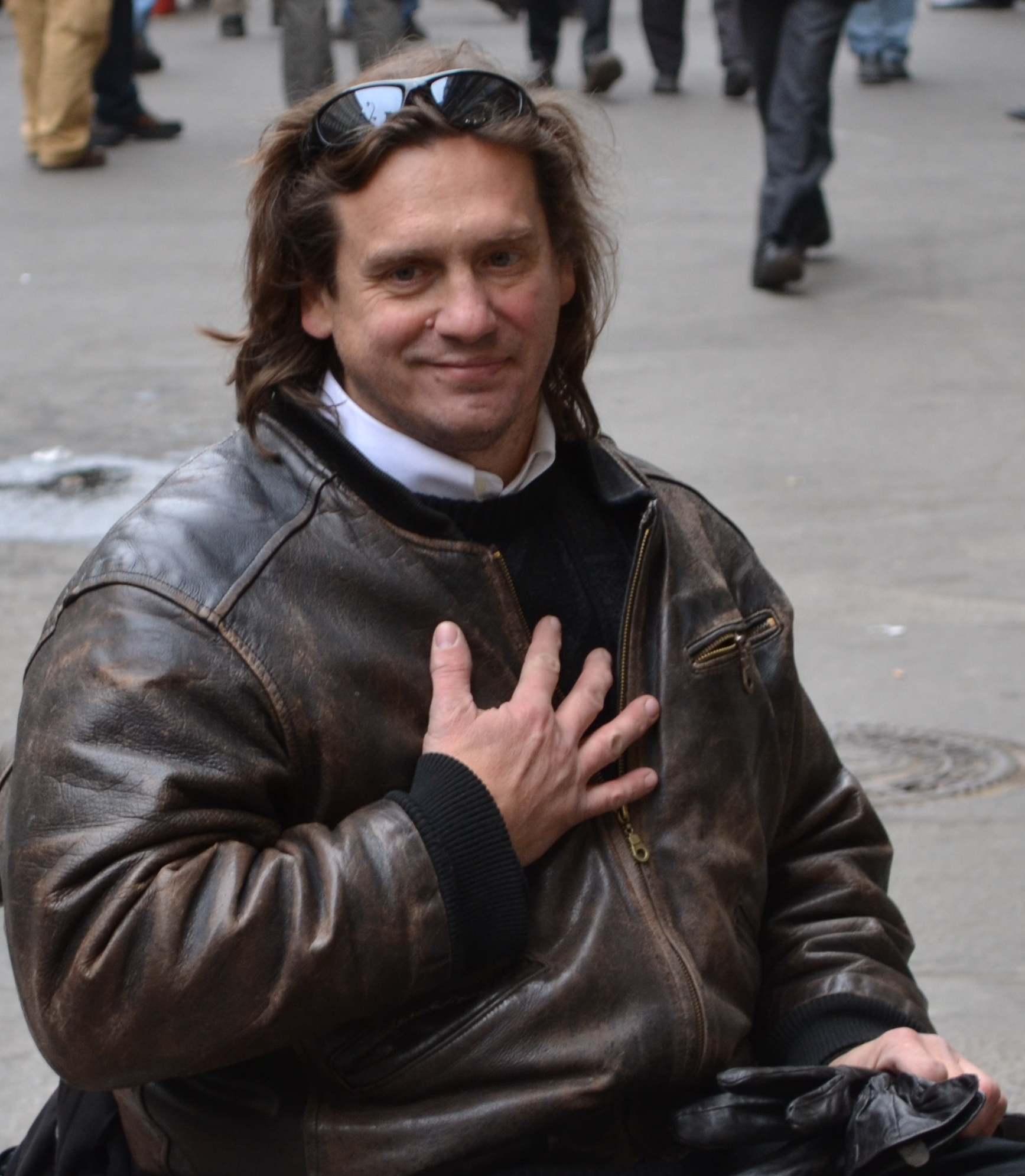
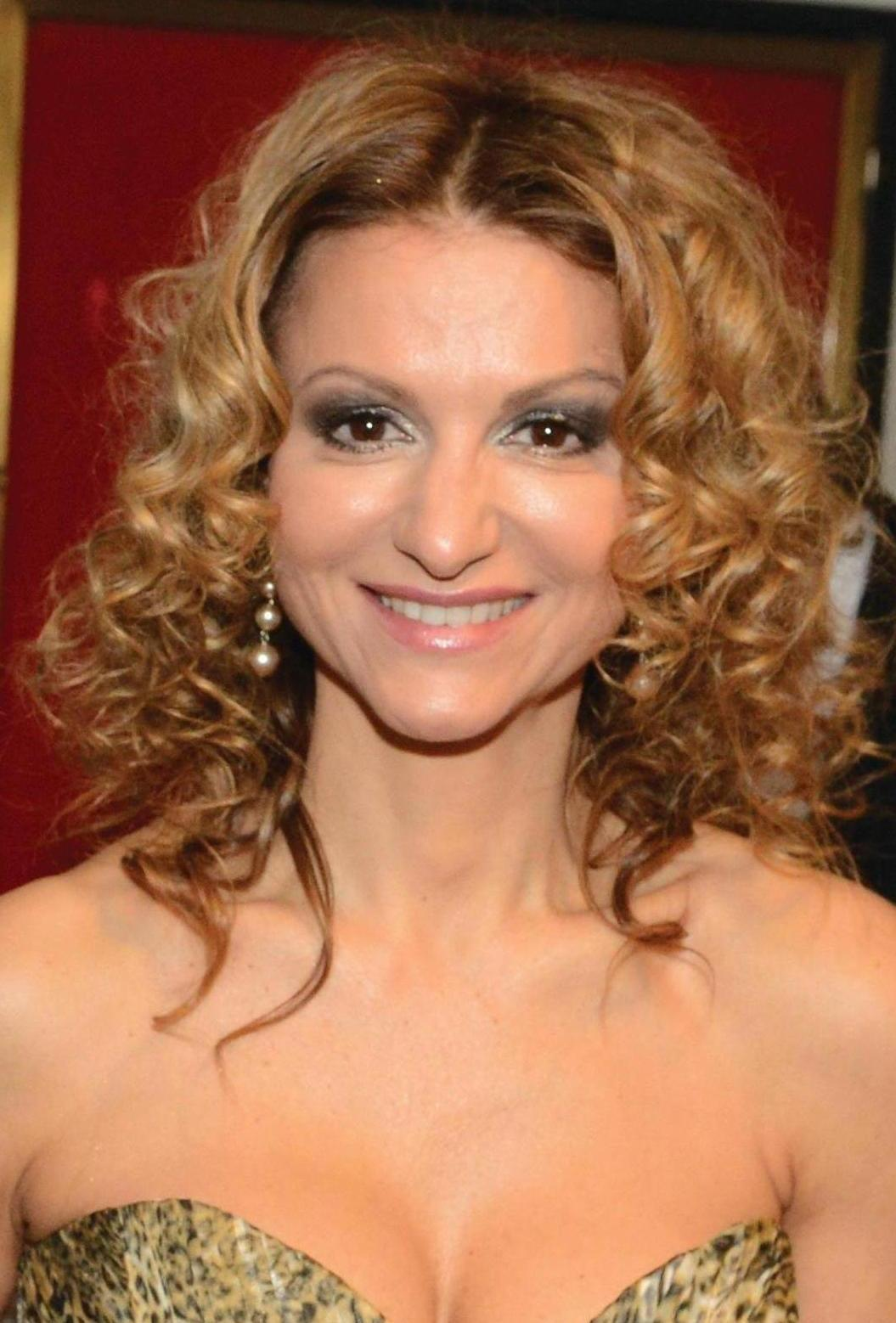
Jan Potměšil stars as Jíra, while Yvetta Blanarovičová appears as Černava, the witch
- Michaela Kuklová as Princess Jasněnka
- Jan Potměšil as Jíra, the shoemaker
- Lubor Tokoš as the King, Jasnenka's father
- Antonie Hegerlíková as the nanny
- Helena Růžičková as the witch
- Yvetta Blanarovičová as Černava, the witch
- Oto Ševčík as Řimbuch
- Jana Preissová as the voice of the Sun
- Zdeněk Podhůrský as the black prince

== Production ==
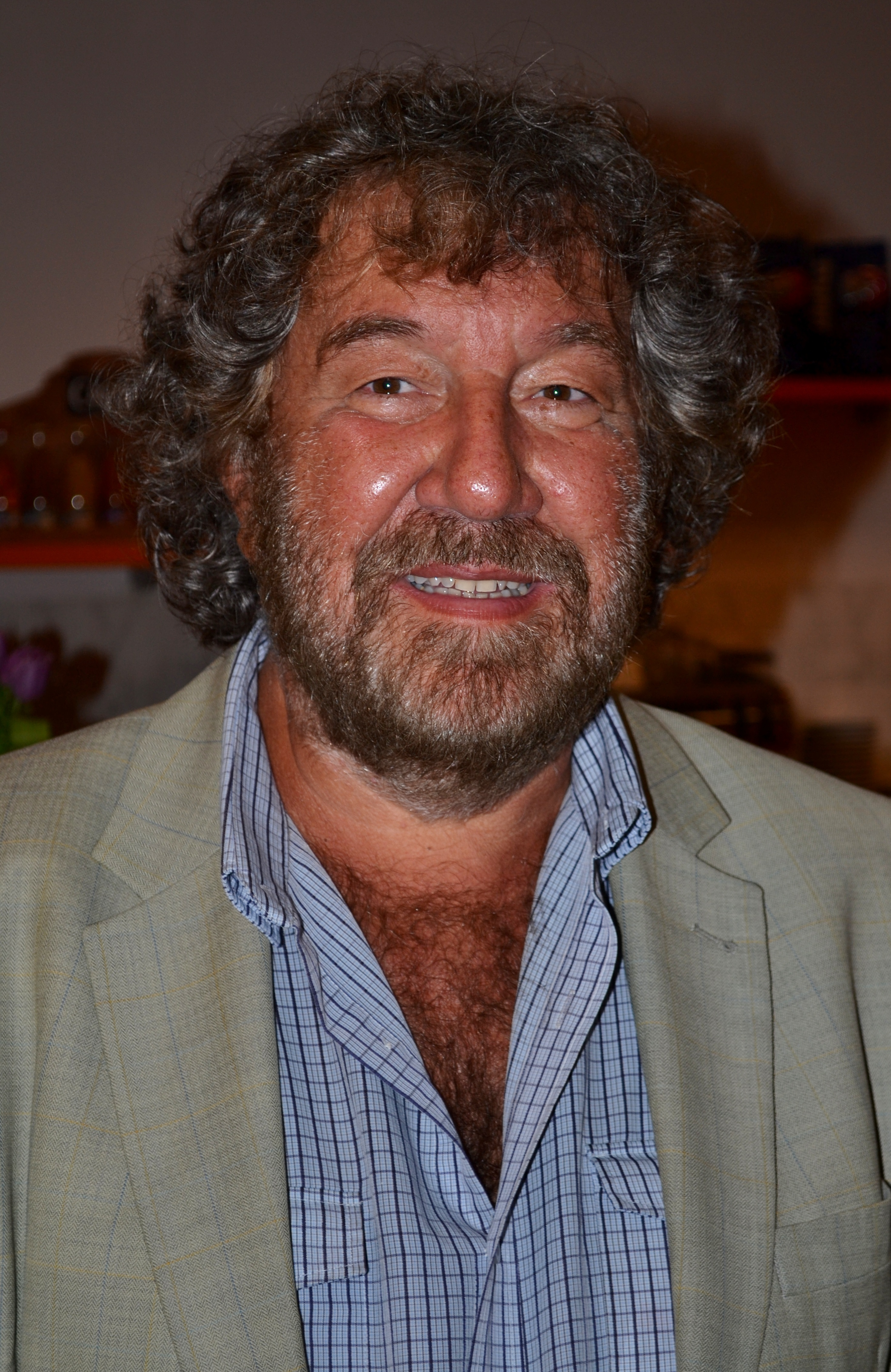
Film director Zdeněk Troška is known for his fairy tale films.

Director Zdeněk Troška made several fairy tale films, often following patterns where a young man ventures from a rural area to find love and defeat corrupt enemies. His other films in this vein include The Loveliest Riddle, Princess from the Mill and its sequel.

For Princess Jasnenka and the Flying Shoemaker, Troška and screenwriter Karel Steigerwald adapted a fairy story by Czech writer and Communist Party member Jan Drda. It was produced by Barrandov Studios, based in Prague. Some of the film was shot in the castles Bouzov and Vítkovec, the latter of which is close to Holany. For the scene where Jira rescues Jasnenka from the tower, an explosion and fire occurred during filming, frightening the lead actors. Troška noted Michaela Kuklová, who was 17 at the time, wept in fear. Jira's wings were based on a 15th-century drawing by artist Leonardo da Vinci.

== Release ==
The film was released in theatres in Czechoslovakia on 1 December 1987. Its English language titles include Princess Jasnenka and the Flying Shoemaker, and Princess Jasna and the Flying Cobbler. In September 2002, it was screened in a series called the Week of Czech and Slovak Films in Pretoria, South Africa. A repeat showing occurred during Film Week in Cape Town during September and October 2002.

The film was screened in a Contemporary Czech Film international festival in Zimbabwe in October and November 2002. It afterwards had a DVD release in the Czech Republic on 1 March 2004.

== Reception ==
The German film lexicon Zweitausendeins complimented the imaginative design of Princess Jasnenka and the Flying Shoemaker. Author Peter Harnes wrote that Troška's films all fell short of the work of Jiří Trnka and Jan Švankmajer. In 2013, the Czech TV Nova called the film a favourite.
