= Playing with the Devil =

- Directed by: Josef Mach
- Screenplay by: Jan Drda; Josef Mach
- Based on: Hrátky s čertem by Jan Drda
- Cinematography: Jan Stallich
- Edited by: Josef Dobřichovský
- Music by: Jiří Srnka
- Production company: Studio hraných filmů
- Distributed by: Ústřední filmová půjčovna
- Release date: 26 April 1957
- Running time: 96 minutes
- Country: Czechoslovakia
- Language: Czech

Playing with the Devil (Czech: Hrátky s čertem) is a 1956 Czech fairy-tale comedy film by Josef Mach based on a 1945 play by Jan Drda. Set decorations were painted by Josef Lada.

== Cast ==
- Josef Bek as Martin Kabát
- Eva Klepáčová as Maid Káča
- Alena Vránová as Princess Dišperanda
- František Smolík as Školastykus
- Jaroslav Vojta as Sarka Farka
- Bohuš Záhorský as King
- Stanislav Neumann as Omnimor
- František Filipovský as Karborund
- Josef Vinklář as Lucius
- Ladislav Pešek as Belzebub
- Vladimír Ráž as Solfernus
- Rudolf Deyl, Jr. as Belial
- Antonín Šůra as Theofil
- Josef Mixa as Hubert
- Jiřina Bílá as Farmer's wife with food

== Other adaptations ==
In 1979, another film adaptation was made in Poland and continues to be popular. It was directed by Tadeusz Lis and starred well-known Polish actors Janusz Gajos, Jerzy Kamas, Marian Kociniak and Marek Kondrat.
