= Božena Böhmová =

Czech actress (1925–2020)

- Born: 22 February 1925; Přísečná
- Died: 25 July 2020 (aged 95)
- Occupation: Actress

Božena Böhmová (22 February 1925 – 25 July 2020) was a Czech actress. Among others she is known for Žena za pultem.

Böhmová was born in the town of Přísečná on February 22, 1925. After living in Prague during the course of WWII, she would end up joining an acting ensemble Obratník that ran street theatre plays. She then decided to improve ensemble theatre in the country by going to Zlín in 1947.

Böhmová died in on 25 July 2020, aged 95.
