= Bony a klid =

1988 Czechoslovak drama film

- Directed by: Vít Olmer
- Written by: Radek John; Vít Olmer
- Produced by: Jaromír Lukás
- Starring: Jan Potměšil
- Cinematography: Ota Kopriva
- Edited by: Ivana Kacírková
- Music by: Ondřej Soukup
- Release date: July 1988
- Running time: 90 minutes
- Country: Czechoslovakia
- Language: Czech

Bony a klid is a Czechoslovak drama film directed by Vít Olmer. It was released in 1988. A sequel, Bony a klid 2 came out in 2014.

== Synopsis ==
Set in Prague, the story centres on Martin, a young man from Mladá Boleslav, who becomes a victim of fraud committed by Richard, a currency dealer. Seeking to get his money back, he attempts to track Richard down and eventually joins his gang, which consists of Hary, Bíny, and Slepejš. He quickly adapts to the lifestyle of big money, debauched parties, prostitutes, and police raids. Bíny betrays one of their deals to a rival gang, led by Karel, and they find themselves on the run from the police. They attempt to seek shelter in Mladá Boleslav but are eventually found. During the chase, Hary falls to his death from a balcony. The gang appears in court, and they are sentenced to serve jail time. It is strongly suggested that Karel has an influence over the judge.

== Cast ==
- Jan Potměšil as Martin
- Veronika Jeníková as Eva
- Josef Nedorost as Richard
- Tomáš Hanák as Hary
- Roman Skamene as Bíny
- Miloslav Kopečný as Slepejš
- Vítězslav Jirsák as Martin's father
- Milos Čálek as Benák
- František Švihlík as Karel

== Music ==
The film is set to the music of Frankie Goes to Hollywood ("Relax", "The Power of Love", "The World Is My Oyster") as well as two songs by Charles Shaw and Silvia Brown (Hold Me Baby and I Leave It Up to You). The soundtrack cover art was designed by Jiří Kovanda.
