= Přísečná =

- Municipality
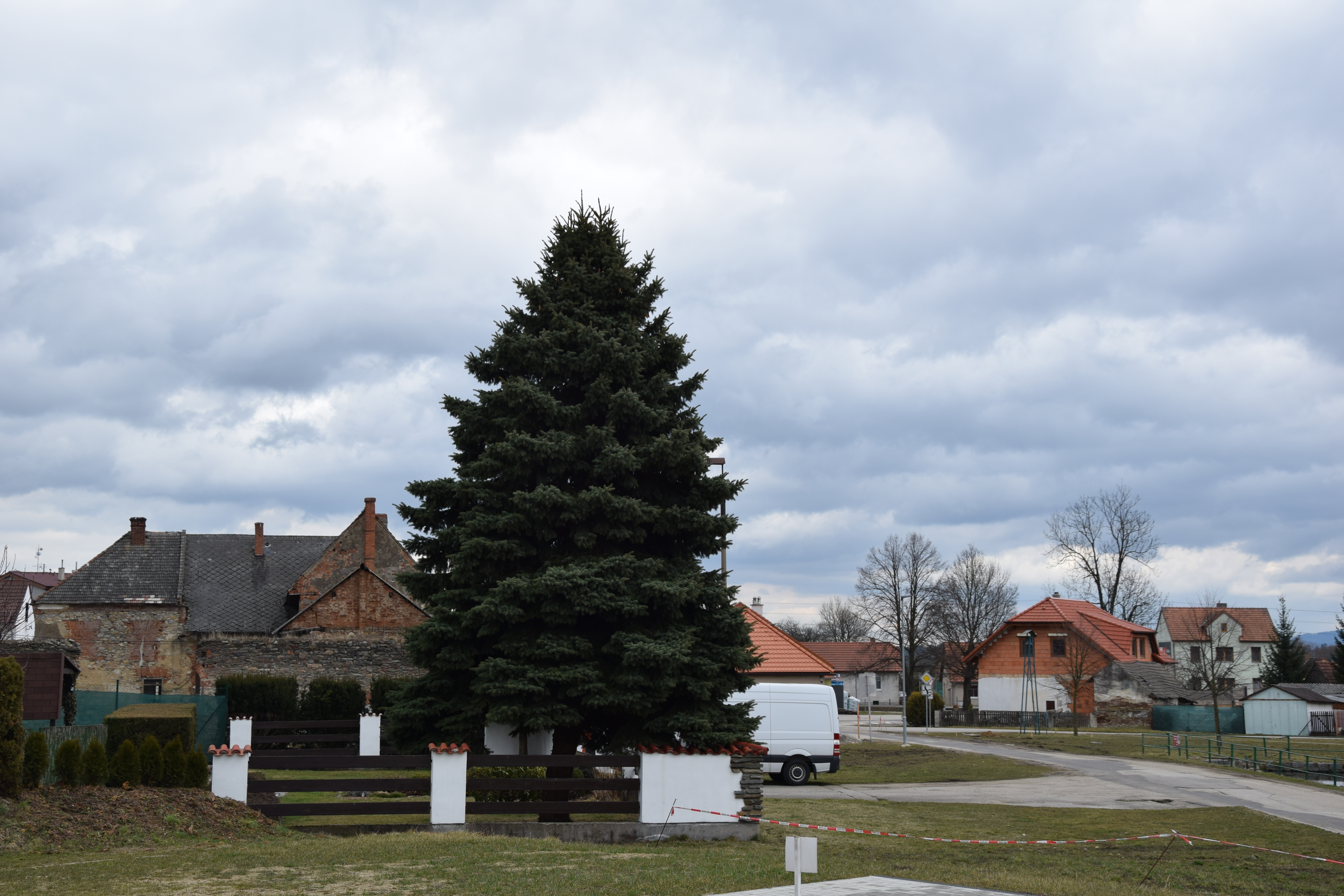
- Centre of Přísečná

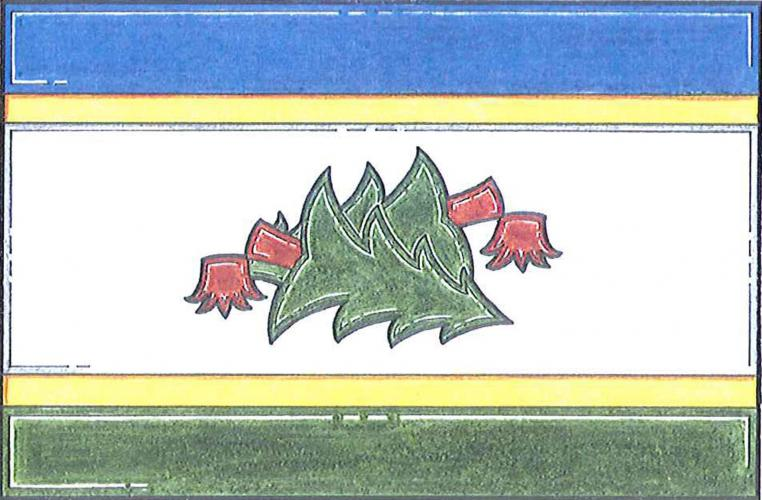
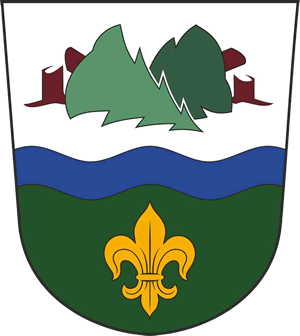
- Flag Coat of arms

- Location in the Czech Republic
- Coordinates: 48°49′59″N 14°20′43″E
- Country: Czech Republic
- Region: South Bohemian Region
- District: Český Krumlov
- First mentioned: 1400

Area
  - Total: 6.29 km^{2} (2.43 sq mi)
- Elevation: 535 m (1,755 ft)

Population (2026-01-01)
  - Total: 210
  - Density: 33/km^{2} (86/sq mi)
- Time zone: UTC+1 (CET)
  - Summer (DST): UTC+2 (CEST)
- Postal code: 381 01
- Website: www.obecprisecna.cz

Přísečná is a municipality and village in Český Krumlov District in the South Bohemian Region of the Czech Republic. It has about 200 inhabitants.

Přísečná lies approximately 4 kilometres (2 mi) north-east of Český Krumlov, 19 km (12 mi) south-west of České Budějovice, and 140 km (87 mi) south of Prague.

== Climate ==
Climate data for Přísečná, 1991–2020 normals, extremes 1990–present
Month	Jan	Feb	Mar	Apr	May	Jun	Jul	Aug	Sep	Oct	Nov	Dec	Year
Record high °C (°F)	18.1 (64.6)	22.0 (71.6)	23.3 (73.9)	28.1 (82.6)	31.9 (89.4)	34.0 (93.2)	36.5 (97.7)	37.0 (98.6)	34.7 (94.5)	27.0 (80.6)	22.1 (71.8)	15.5 (59.9)	37.0 (98.6)
Mean daily maximum °C (°F)	2.3 (36.1)	4.0 (39.2)	8.6 (47.5)	14.6 (58.3)	19.0 (66.2)	22.5 (72.5)	24.6 (76.3)	24.5 (76.1)	19.0 (66.2)	13.4 (56.1)	6.8 (44.2)	2.9 (37.2)	13.5 (56.3)
Daily mean °C (°F)	−1.1 (30.0)	−0.3 (31.5)	3.2 (37.8)	8.2 (46.8)	12.8 (55.0)	16.4 (61.5)	18.1 (64.6)	17.5 (63.5)	12.7 (54.9)	8.0 (46.4)	3.2 (37.8)	−0.3 (31.5)	8.2 (46.8)
Mean daily minimum °C (°F)	−4.3 (24.3)	−4.0 (24.8)	−1.0 (30.2)	2.4 (36.3)	6.7 (44.1)	10.3 (50.5)	12.0 (53.6)	11.6 (52.9)	7.8 (46.0)	3.9 (39.0)	0.2 (32.4)	−3.3 (26.1)	3.5 (38.3)
Record low °C (°F)	−22.6 (−8.7)	−23.6 (−10.5)	−21.6 (−6.9)	−7.8 (18.0)	−3.3 (26.1)	0.0 (32.0)	3.5 (38.3)	2.5 (36.5)	−2.3 (27.9)	−9.8 (14.4)	−15.0 (5.0)	−24.0 (−11.2)	−24.0 (−11.2)
Average precipitation mm (inches)	29.0 (1.14)	23.1 (0.91)	37.6 (1.48)	35.8 (1.41)	83.2 (3.28)	102.1 (4.02)	97.4 (3.83)	89.9 (3.54)	54.3 (2.14)	46.8 (1.84)	33.1 (1.30)	29.9 (1.18)	662.1 (26.07)
Average snowfall cm (inches)	19.9 (7.8)	14.8 (5.8)	11.6 (4.6)	3.9 (1.5)	0.0 (0.0)	0.0 (0.0)	0.0 (0.0)	0.0 (0.0)	0.0 (0.0)	1.0 (0.4)	7.2 (2.8)	12.8 (5.0)	71.2 (28.0)
Average relative humidity (%)	80.5	77.0	73.9	69.6	71.6	72.0	70.5	72.4	78.3	81.0	83.7	82.0	76.0
Mean monthly sunshine hours	58.7	82.8	124.8	179.7	212.3	214.6	223.8	222.2	159.4	112.0	53.3	41.4	1,685
Source: Czech Hydrometeorological Institute

== Demographics ==
Historical population
Year	Pop.	±%
1869	223	—
1880	267	+19.7%
1890	297	+11.2%
1900	274	−7.7%
1910	291	+6.2%
1921	286	−1.7%
1930	297	+3.8%
1950	242	−18.5%
1961	220	−9.1%
1970	202	−8.2%
1980	207	+2.5%
1991	191	−7.7%
2001	198	+3.7%
2011	196	−1.0%
2021	188	−4.1%
Source: Censuses

== Notable people ==
- Božena Böhmová (1925–2020), actress
