= Hrusice =

- Municipality
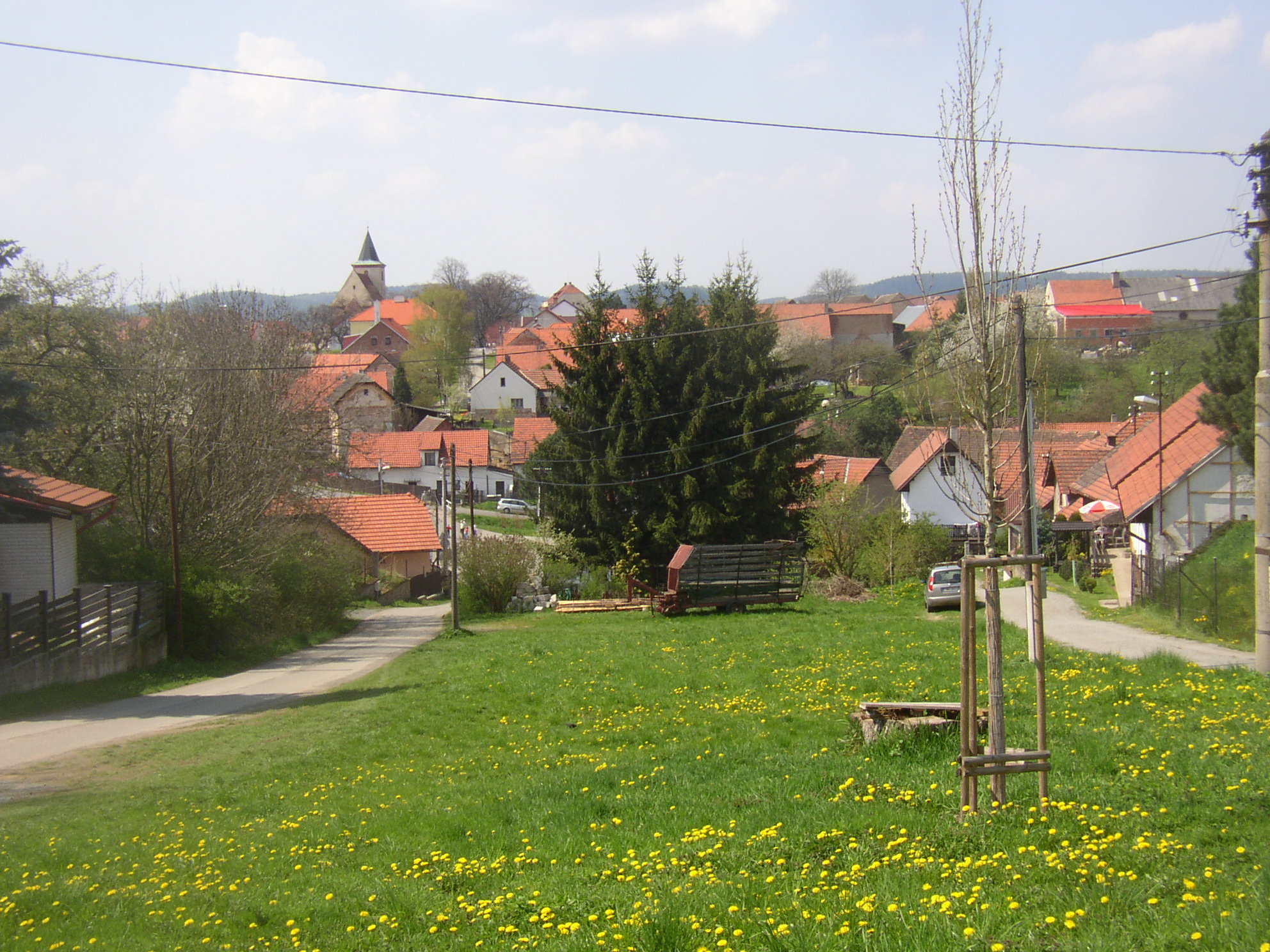
- View from the east

- Flag Coat of arms

- Location in the Czech Republic
- Coordinates: 49°54′36″N 14°44′17″E
- Country: Czech Republic
- Region: Central Bohemian
- District: Prague-East
- First mentioned: 1205

Area
  - Total: 5.43 km^{2} (2.10 sq mi)
- Elevation: 365 m (1,198 ft)

Population (2026-01-01)
  - Total: 964
  - Density: 178/km^{2} (460/sq mi)
- Time zone: UTC+1 (CET)
  - Summer (DST): UTC+2 (CEST)
- Postal code: 251 66
- Website: www.obec-hrusice.cz

Hrusice (Czech pronunciation: [ˈɦrusɪtsɛ]) is a municipality and village in Prague-East District in the Central Bohemian Region of the Czech Republic. It has about 1,000 inhabitants. The municipality is located in the Benešov Uplands.

Hrusice is known as birthplace of the painter and illustrator Josef Lada.

== Etymology ==
The initial name of the village was probably Hrušice. The name was derived from the surname Hruša, meaning "the village of Hruša's people".

== Geography ==
Hrusice is located about 20 kilometres (12 mi) southeast of Prague. It lies in a rolled landscape of the Benešov Uplands. The highest point is at 438 m (1,437 ft) above sea level. There are two fishponds in the municipal territory: Hrusický rybník in the centre of the village and Hubačovský rybník in the northwest. The stream Hrusický potok flows through the municipality.

== History ==
The first written mention of Hrusice is from 1205, in a deed of King Ottokar I. Hrusice belonged to the direct administration of the Přemyslid dynasty. In 1848, the municipality gained self-government.

== Demographics ==
The municipality has experienced a significant growth in the 21st century.

Historical population

Year	Pop.	±%
1869	439	—
1880	409	−6.8%
1890	425	+3.9%
1900	424	−0.2%
1910	437	+3.1%

Year	Pop.	±%
1921	450	+3.0%
1930	454	+0.9%
1950	572	+26.0%
1961	547	−4.4%
1970	508	−7.1%

Year	Pop.	±%
1980	468	−7.9%
1991	374	−20.1%
2001	382	+2.1%
2011	679	+77.7%
2021	913	+34.5%

Source: Censuses

== Transport ==
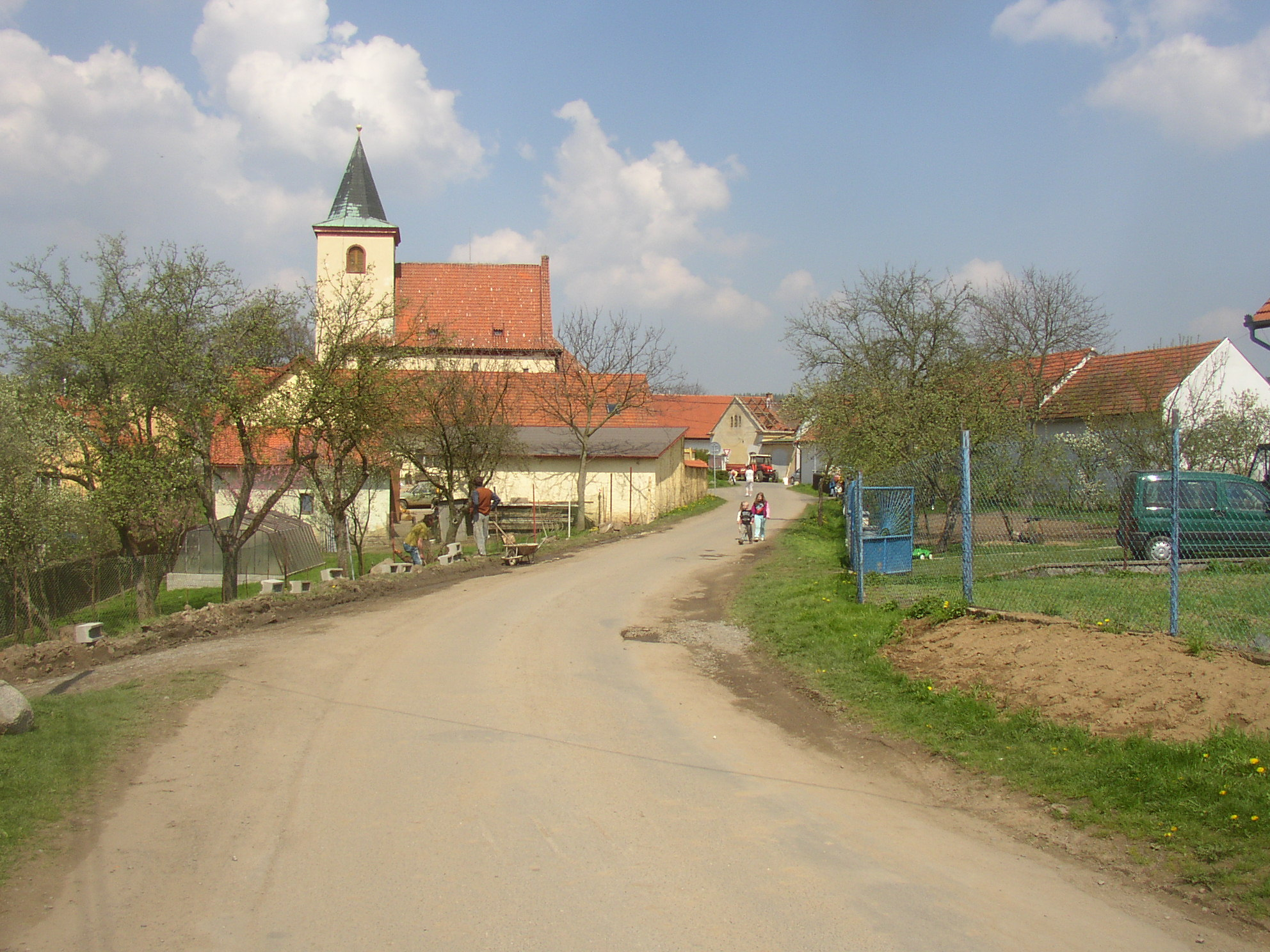
Hrusice as seen from the south

The accessibility of Hrusice is good due to proximity of two major transport lines. The D1 motorway from Prague to Brno runs through the municipal territory of Hrusice.

There also operates a suburban bus line between Strančice and Stříbrná Skalice (via Mnichovice and Ondřejov) with a stop in the centre of Hrusice.

== Sights ==
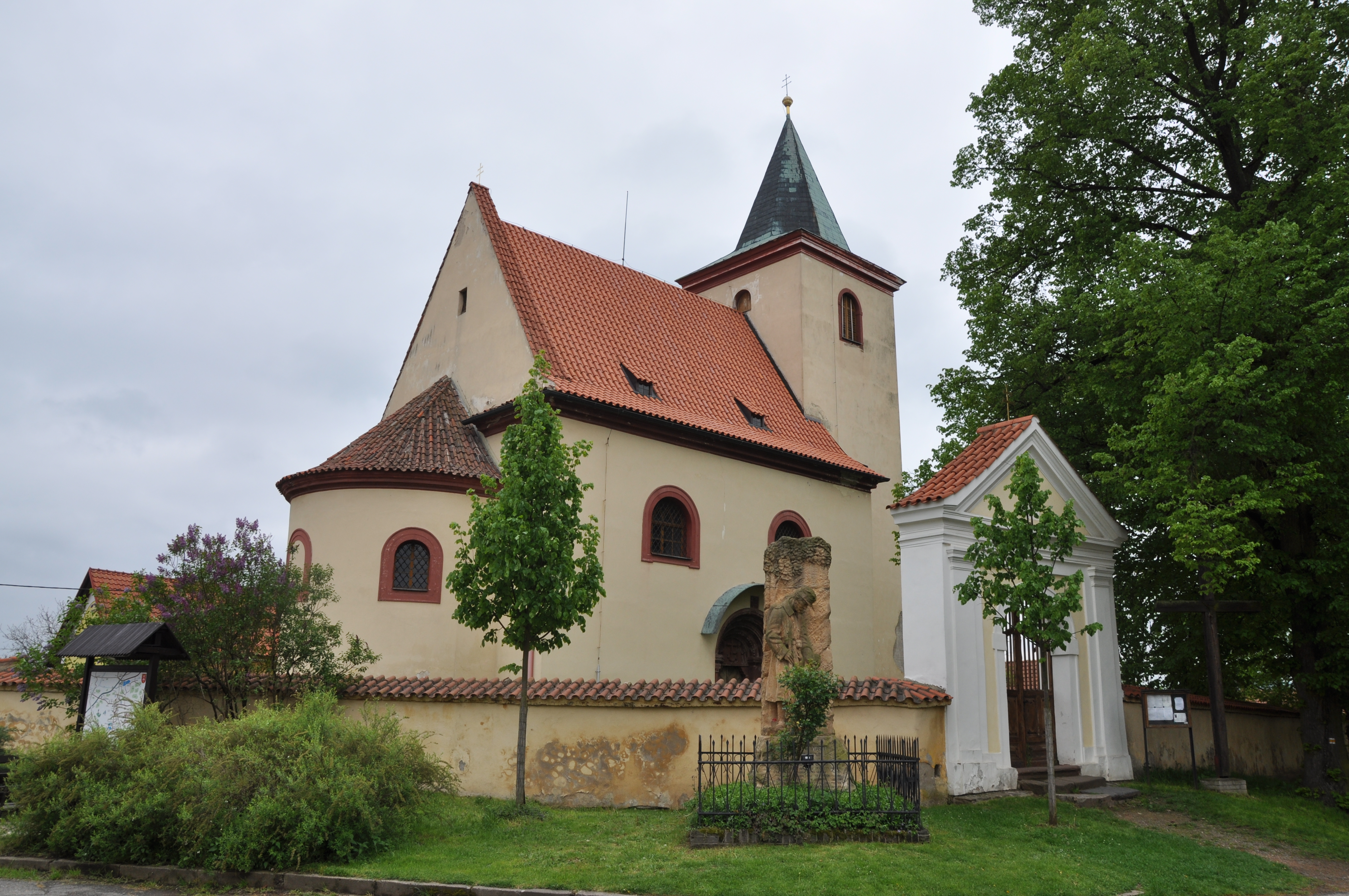
Church of Saint Wenceslaus

The main historical landmark of Hrusice is the Church of Saint Wenceslaus, located in the centre of Hrusice. It is an example of rural Romanesque architecture from the turn of the 12th century with a valuable sandstone portal, a work by monks from the Sázava Monastery.

Josef Lada Memorial in artist's villa, nowadays a branch of Prague-East Regional Museum, presents his life and work as well as his daughter Alena Ladová, also a renowned illustrator.

== Notable people ==
- Josef Lada (1887–1957), painter, illustrator and writer

== Gallery ==
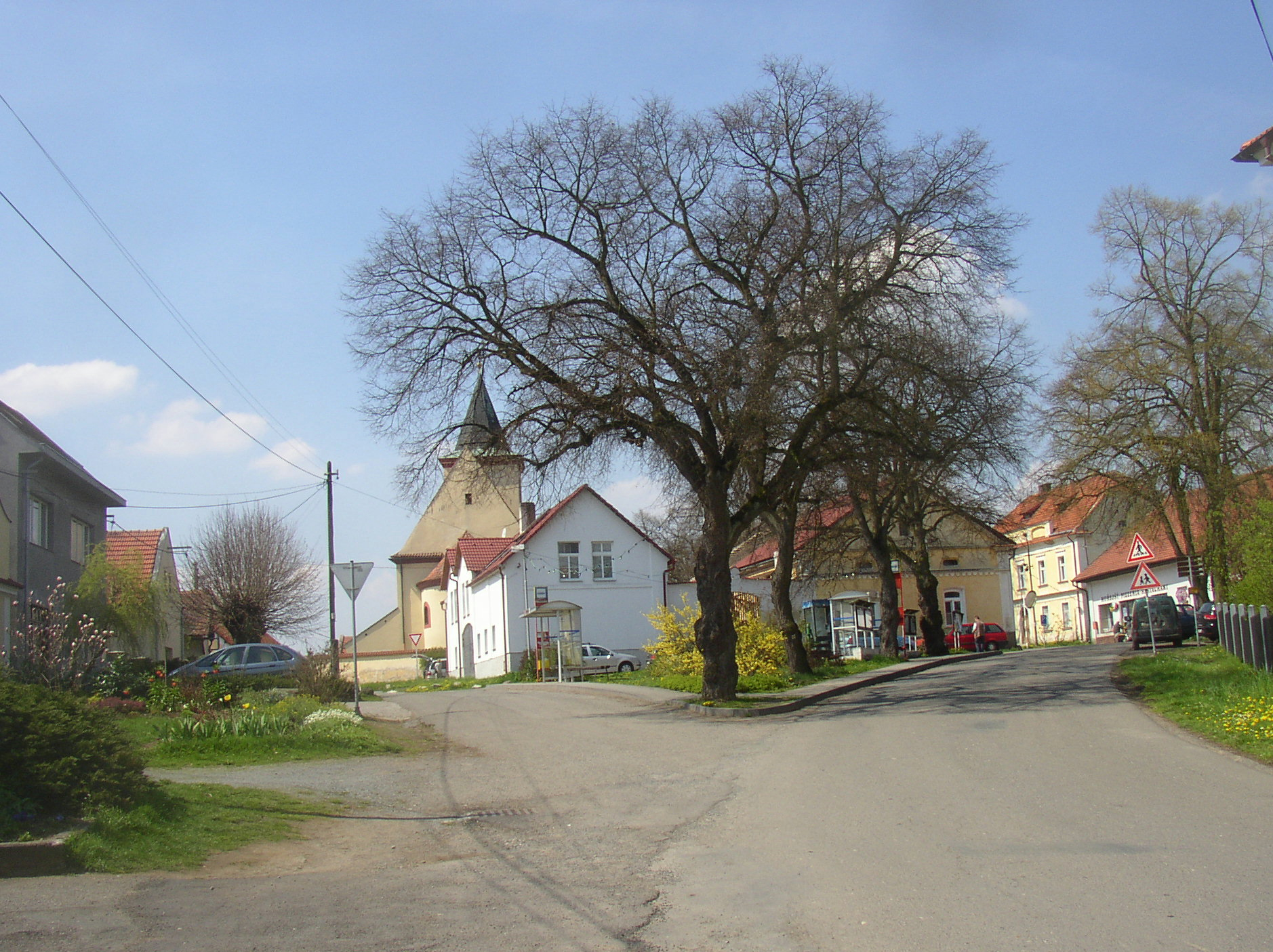
Centre of Hrusice with a bus stop

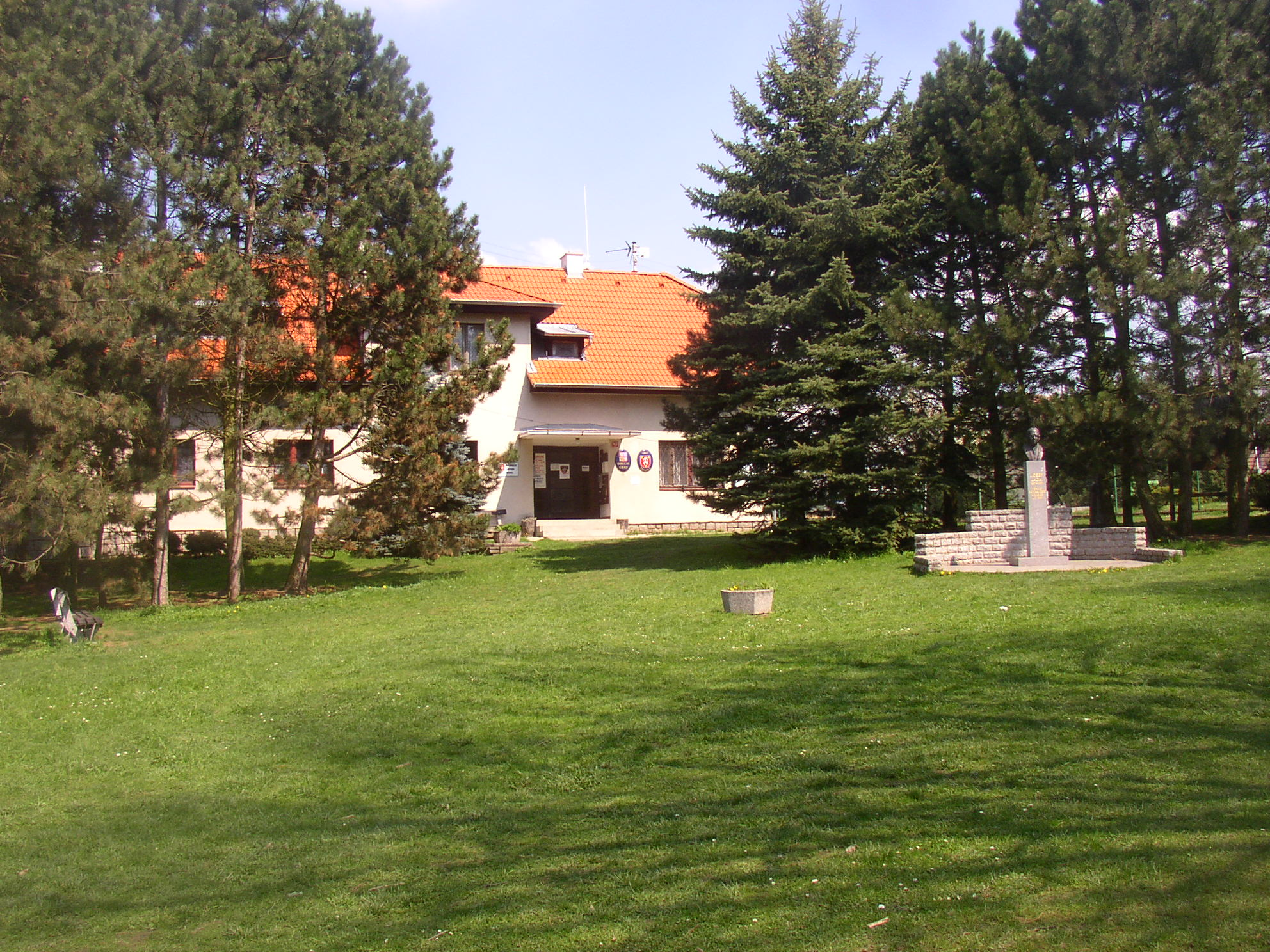
Municipal office and a small park with bust of Josef Lada

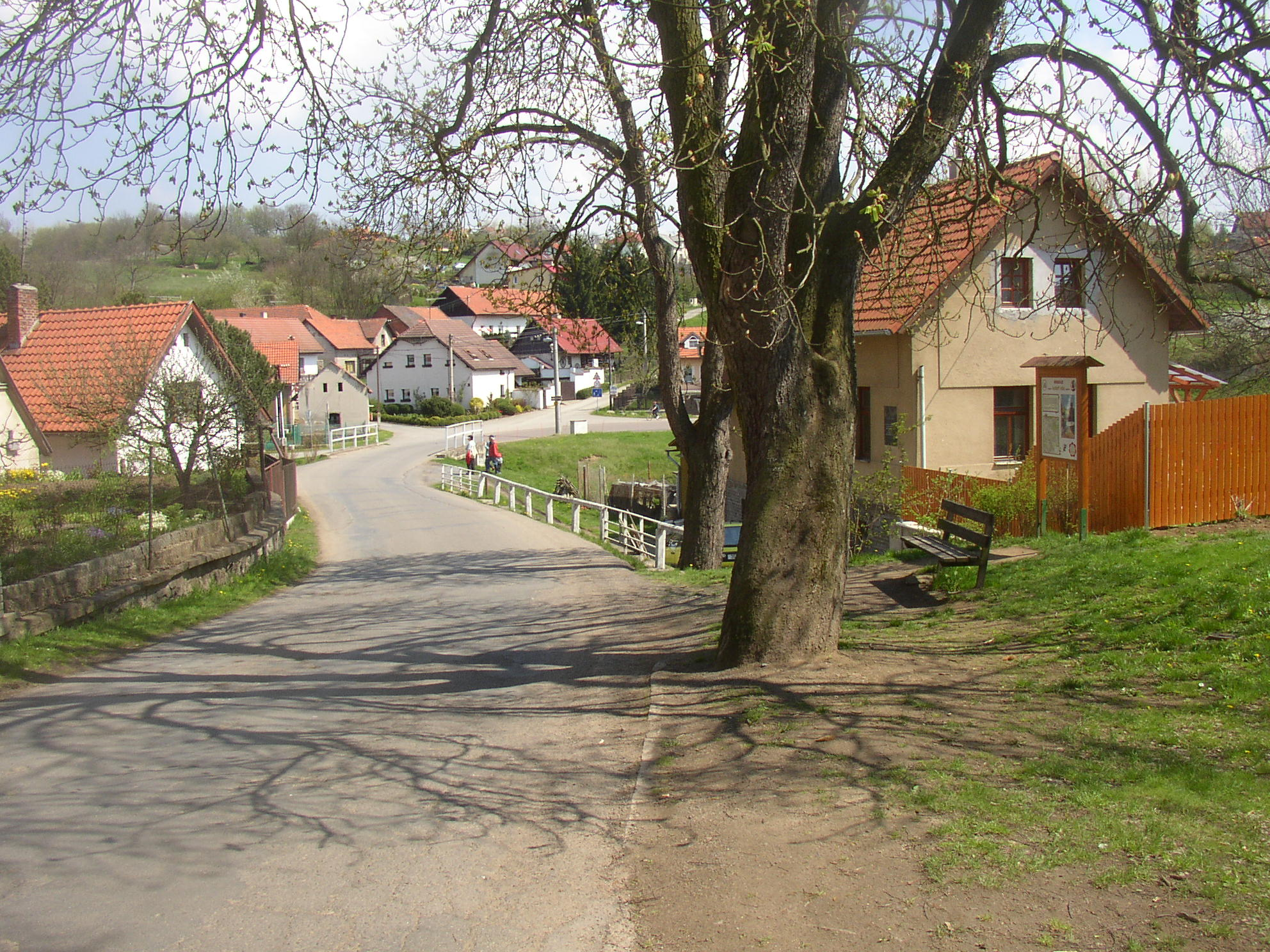
Birthplace of Josef Lada

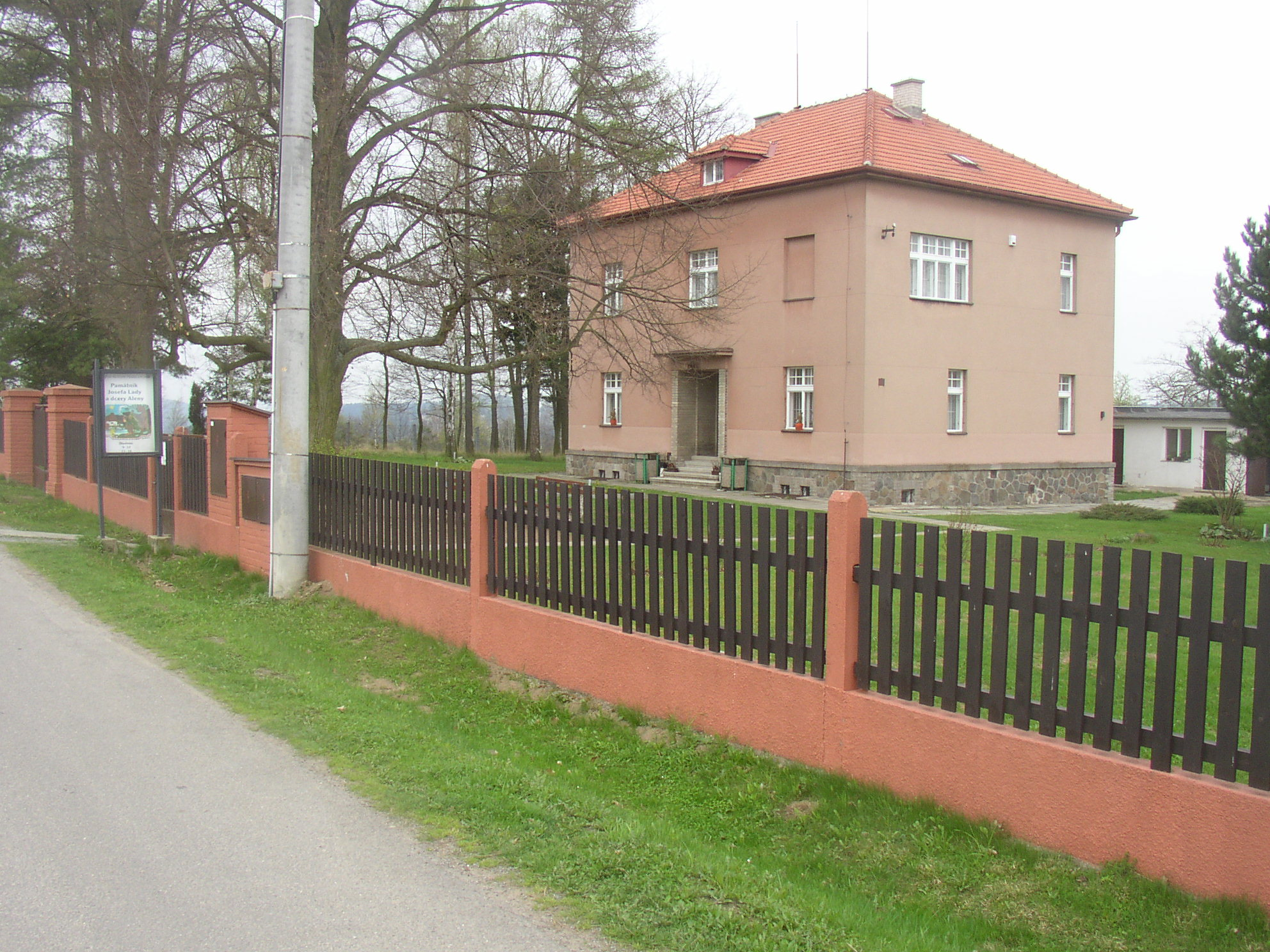
Lada's summer villa, nowadays his museum
