= Jiří Bruder =

Jiří Bruder (13 April 1928 – 31 May 2014) was a Czech film, theatre and voice actor.

== Career ==
He was a recipient of the František Filipovský Awards for his lifetime achievements in dubbing (1998). During his career, he worked in Prague Municipal Theatres or Laterna Magika. Beginning in the 1990s he also appeared in the ABC Theatre. In film, he appeared in Byli jednou dva písaři, Nemocnice na kraji města, Žena za pultem, Arabela or Dobrodružství kriminalistiky.
