= Miloslav Kopečný =

Czech actor

Miloslav Kopečný (18 September 1944 – 7 October 2026) was a Czech actor. He appeared in over 30 films and television programs between 1967 to 2024, and was best known for playing Slepejš in the 1988 film Bony a klid.

Kopečný died on 7 October 2026, at the age of 82.
