= Golet in the Valley =

1995 film directed by Zeno Dostál

Golet v údolí
- Directed by: Zeno Dostál
- Screenplay by: Zeno Dostál; Jana Dudková
- Starring: Ondřej Vetchý
- Cinematography: Juraj Šajmovič
- Edited by: Michal Cuc
- Music by: Luboš Fišer
- Production company: Czech Television
- Distributed by: Lucernafilm
- Release date: 11 May 1995
- Running time: 90 minutes
- Country: Czech Republic
- Language: Czech

Golet in the Valley (Czech: Golet v údolí) is a 1995 Czech comedy-drama film directed by Zeno Dostál.

== Cast ==
- Ondřej Vetchý as Bajnyš Zisovič
- Jan Hartl as Pinches Jakubovič
- Jiří Ornest as Mojše Kahan
- Mahulena Bočanová as Brana
- Yvetta Blanarovičová as Rojza Bajnyšová
- Jana Dolanská as Fajga Kahanová
- Josef Kemr as Lejb Fajnerman
- Ivan Řezáč as Tourist
- Markéta Hrubešová as Lady
