= Yvetta Blanarovičová =

Slovak actress and singer

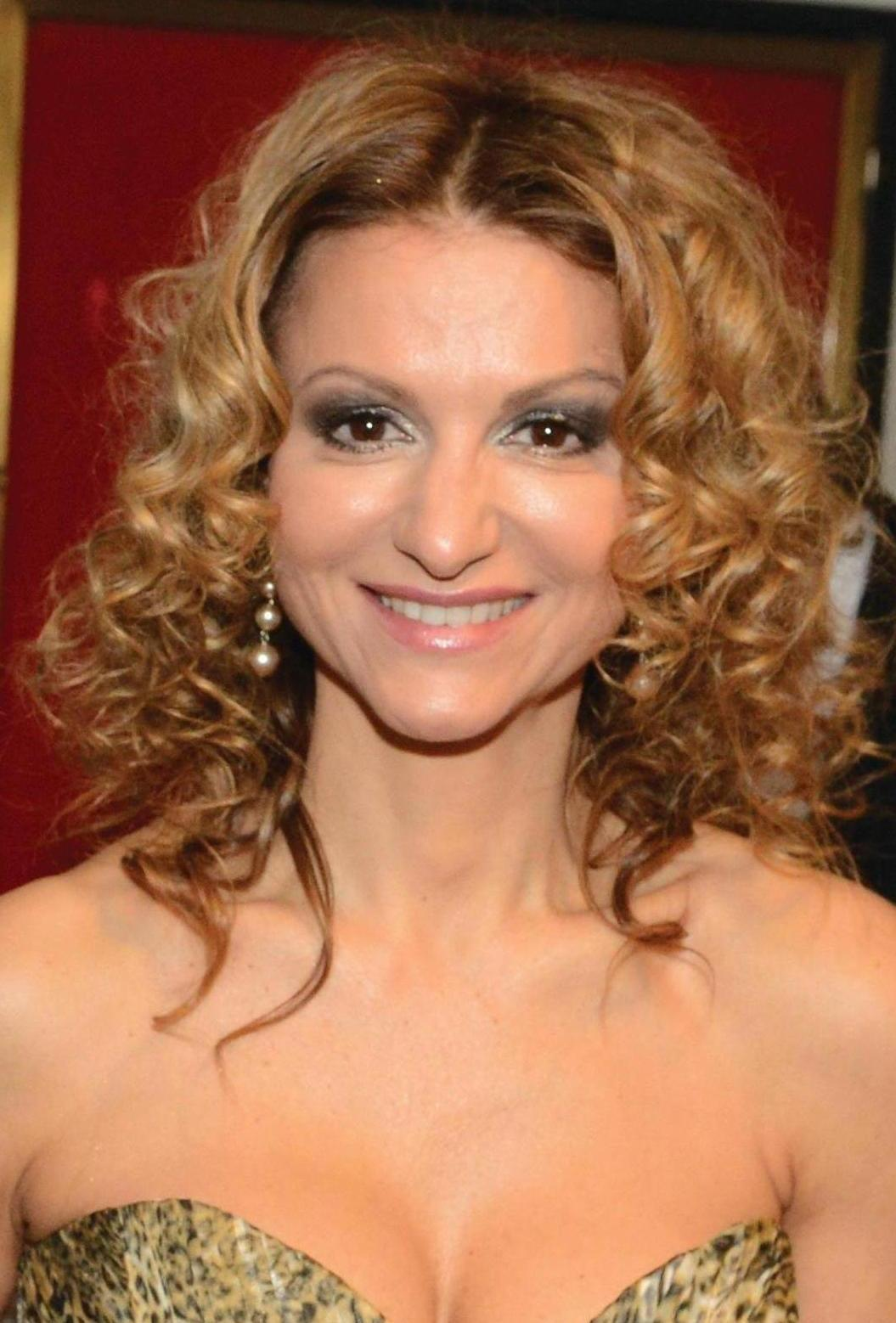
- Blanarovičová in 2013
- Born: 24 September 1963 (age 61); Bojnice, Czechoslovakia (now Slovakia)
- Occupation(s): Actress, singer
- Years active: 1983–present

Yvetta Blanarovičová (born 24 September 1963) is a Slovak actress and singer. At the 1994 Thalia Awards she won the category of Best Actress in an Opera, Opereta or Musical, for her performance in the musical My Fair Lady.

== Selected filmography ==
- The Night of the Emerald Moon (1985)
- Princess Jasnenka and the Flying Shoemaker (1987)
- Vrať se do hrobu! (1990)
- Golet v údolí (1995)
