= Jan Potměšil =

Czech actor (1966–2026)

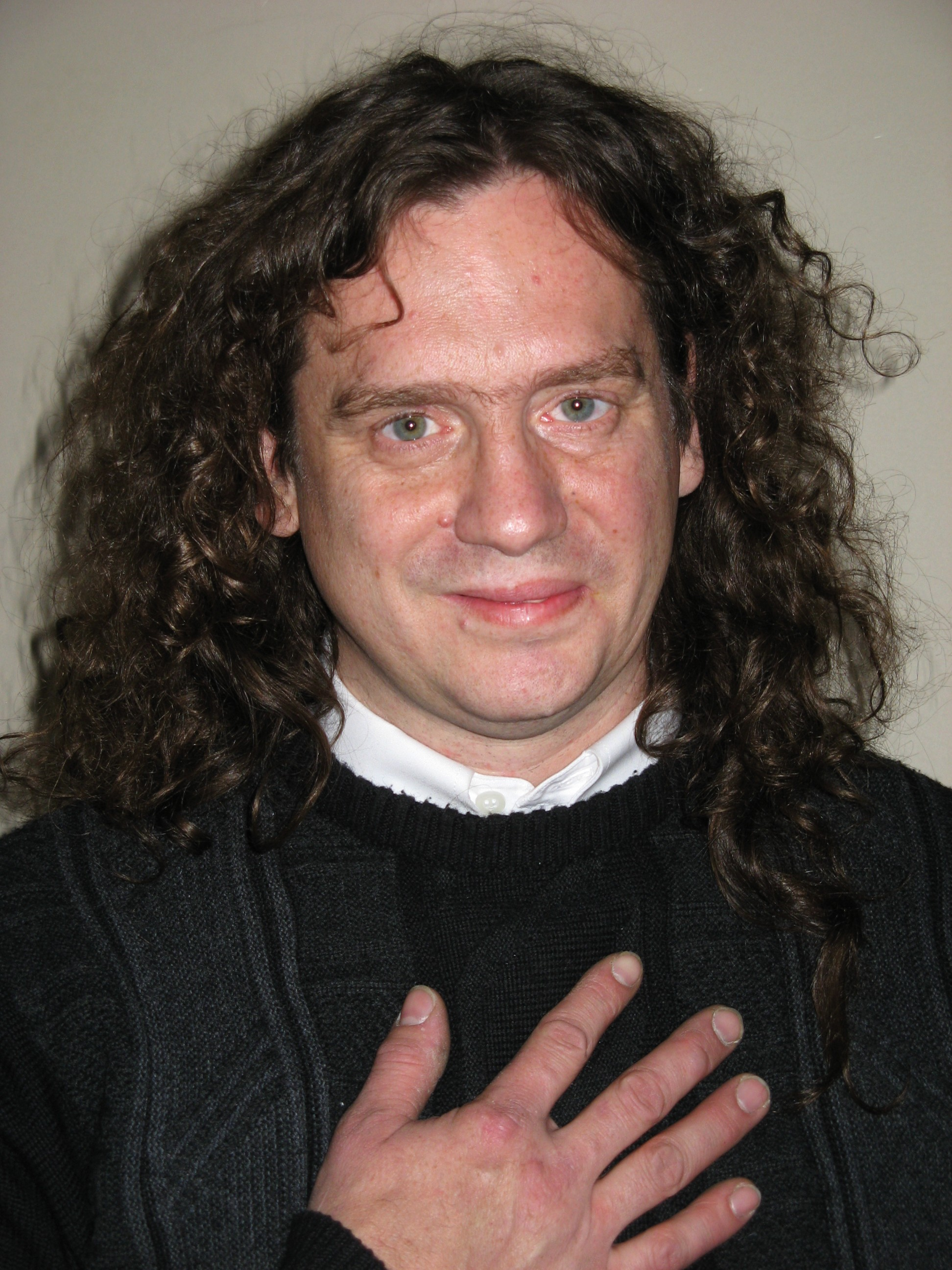
- Potmĕšil in 2006
- Born: 31 March 1966; Prague, Czechoslovakia
- Died: 16 April 2026 (aged 60); Prague, Czech Republic
- Education: Theatre Faculty of the Academy of Performing Arts in Prague
- Occupation: Actor
- Years active: 1976–2026

Jan Potměšil (31 March 1966 – 16 April 2026) was a Czech actor.

== Life and career ==
In the summer of 1989, Potměšil finished his lectures at the Theatre Faculty of the Academy of Performing Arts in Prague and joined Divadlo na Vinohradech. Later that year, he hooked up with other students and actors who were going to Ostrava to persuade the miners to support the Velvet Revolution. On the way back, he was injured in car accident, suffering a severe spinal injury. He was in the backseat at the time of the crash. It has been suspected that the accident was caused by the driver falling into a microsleep, a theory Potměšil supported. Another actor, Jan Kačer was also in the car at the time of the crash, sitting in the passenger seat. After the accident, Potměšil was paralysed from the waist down, requiring him to use a wheelchair.

Potměšil was a prominent member of the Kašpar theatre company that performs in the Divadlo v Celetné, Prague. He performed major characters in several plays. The most notable ones include Charlie Gordon in Flowers for Algernon (more than ten years on the repertoire), the title role in Richard III (received Alfréd Radok Award for best actor), Jesus in Felix Mitterer's Trouble in the House of God, or Polonius in Hamlet. In Lyra Pragensis, he performed Henri Toulouse-Lautrec in Pavlík's Beauty from Moulin Rouge, Fletcher in a scenic reading of Richard Bach's Jonathan Livingston Seagull, and Dickie in Running from Safety of the same author.

Potměšil died on 16 April 2026, at the age of 60, after a long period of severe health problems. His wife stated that he had died in his sleep.

== Selected filmography ==
- Žena za pultem (The Woman Behind the Counter; 1977) as Petr Holub
- Why? (1987) as Milan
- Princess Jasnenka and the Flying Shoemaker (1987) as Jíra, the shoemaker
- Bony a klid (1987) as Martin Holec
- In the Coat of Lioness' Arms (1994) as the knight
