= Lubor Tokoš =

Czech actor

- Born: 7 February 1923; Šternberk, Czechoslovakia
- Died: 29 September 2003 (aged 80); Zlín, Czech Republic
- Occupation: Actor
- Years active: 1948–2003

Lubor Tokoš (7 February 1923 in Šternberk – 29 September 2003 in Zlín) was a Czech actor. He starred in the 1969/1970 film Witchhammer under director Otakar Vávra.

== Selected filmography ==
- The Great Opportunity (1950)
- The Fabulous World of Jules Verne (1958)
- Witchhammer (1970)
- Forbidden Dreams (1986)
- Princess Jasnenka and the Flying Shoemaker (1987)
