= Higher Principle =

- Directed by: Jiří Krejčík
- Written by: Jan Drda; Jiří Krejčík
- Starring: František Smolík; Hannjo Hasse; Jana Brejchová; Ivan Mistrík
- Cinematography: Jaroslav Tuzar
- Edited by: Josef Dobřichovský
- Music by: Zdeněk Liška
- Production company: Filmové studio Barrandov
- Distributed by: Ústřední půjčovna filmů
- Release date: 23 November 1960
- Running time: 102 minutes
- Country: Czechoslovakia
- Language: Czech

Higher Principle (Czech: Vyšší princip) is a Czech drama film based on the eponymous short story from the book Silent Barricade (Czech: Němá barikáda) written by Jan Drda in 1946. The movie was released in 1960 and was temporarily banned in West Germany as the "anti-German film".

== Plot ==
The story takes place in the town of Kostelec in 1942, during the Nazi occupation, shortly after Czech and Slovak resistance fighters assassinated Reinhard Heydrich, the Reichsprotector of Bohemia and Moravia, precipitating a vengeful Nazi crackdown. When the movie opens, the owner of the town bookstore is placing a comical maquette in his shop window, featuring photos of students who are soon to graduate from the local high school as well as a photo of their elderly Latin teacher, Professor Málek (played by František Smolík), as he points to the words "Higher Principle," the nickname that the students have given him on account of his frequent quotation of Seneca's moral precepts. A local Nazi official takes offense at the lightheartedness of the maquette, considering it out of keeping with official mourning for Heydrich, and orders it removed.

Teachers at the high school and its director worry that the episode will get them in trouble with the local Gestapo, but the students don't take it seriously, and in fact, when one notices a photo of Heydrich in the newspaper that his open-faced sandwich came wrapped in, he and a friend ink a comical mustache and beard onto the portrait. A more cautious student quickly shoves the caricature into the schoolroom stove, but later we see a student named Zajíček, who is flunking most of his classes, washing soot off one of his hands. Zajíček's father, played by a young Rudolf Hrušinský, happens to be in a relationship with a secretary at the town's Gestapo headquarters, and his shoestore is going bankrupt, giving him a motive for collaboration.

At a meeting of the school's teachers, Professor Málek reads aloud a passage from Seneca that seems dangerously appropriate to the times, and to the relief of his fellow teachers, he says that he won't be assigning it as the text for the students' final Latin exam, but will instead be choosing a passage in Tacitus about a man who protested injustice with a hunger strike. The exam preoccupies the students, who ask to be excused from their Czech class in order to prepare for it. Vlasta Ryšánek (Ivan Mistrík), son of a washerwoman, can translate Latin extemporaneously, but most of his classmates find it a struggle, including Jana Skálová (played by Jana Brejchová), who is in love with Vlasta, and depends on his coaching and crib sheets to pass exams. Her father is a lawyer and disapproves of her friendship with Vlasta, in part because Vlasta's mother does Jana's family's laundry.

In the middle of their year-end Latin exam, Gestapo officers arrest three classmates, including Vlasta, without any explanation. Professor Málek visits Jana's father to ask him to intervene, and the lawyer eventually promises both Málek and his daughter that he will try. But as Jana discovers, while spying on her father, he is too frightened even to enter Gestapo headquarters, despite having made an acquaintance with a strangely friendly Gestapo commander—an acquaintance accidentally witnessed by a student who wasn't arrested, Honza Horák (Petr Kostka), who is trying to help Jana find out what's happening to Vlasta and his companions. After Jana tells Professor Málek of her father's loss of nerve, he visits the Gestapo commander himself at his home. To Málek's surprise, the commander says that when he was in the boy scouts, he was taught to do a good deed every day, and that he'll do one for Málek.

But by the time he returns to his office, the three boys have already been sentenced and taken away to be shot. To save face, the Gestapo office reassures Málek that "the matter has been settled," and Jana carries the reassurance to Vlasta's mother, reaching her just as the Nazis are announcing her son's execution over the town's loudspeakers. In a final scene, at the school, the German teacher, eager to curry favor with the Nazis, insists that Málek deliver a lecture warning his students against the mockery of Heydrich committed by their late classmates. Instead, risking his own life, the teacher declares to the class that "From the standpoint of higher moral principles the murder of a tyrant is not a crime!"

== Cast ==
- František Smolík as Professor Málek
- Jana Brejchová as Student Jana
- Ivan Mistrík as Student Vlastík
- Alexander Postler as Student Karel
- Jan Šmíd as Student Frantík
- Petr Kostka as student Honza
- Bohuš Záhorský as High school principal
- Hannjo Hasse as Gestapo officer
- Rudolf Hrušínský as Collaborator Zajíček
