= Vladimír Županský =

Czech artist (1869–1928)

Vladimír Županský (September 24, 1869 - September 20, 1928) was a Czech painter and graphic artist. He designed posters and book covers. He is best remembered for his curtain painting in the Vinohrady Theatre which is said to "depict a naked Muse of a comely girlish figure descending on pinions among inspired artists".
