= Josef Lada =

Czech illustrator and painter (1887–1957)

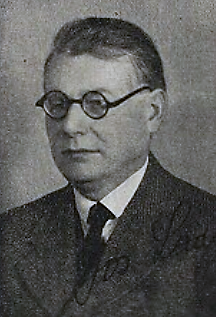
- Lada in 1940
- Born: 17 December 1887; Hrusice, Kingdom of Bohemia, Austria-Hungary
- Died: 14 December 1957 (aged 69); Prague, Czechoslovakia
- Occupations: Illustrator, Writer

Signature
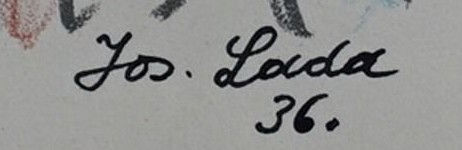

Josef Lada (17 December 1887 – 14 December 1957) was a Czech painter, illustrator, cartoonist and writer. He was pioneer of the Czech comicbook tradition and founder of the "Czech modern fairytale" genre. He is considered one of the greatest Czech artists of all times – which is also what the artist Pablo Picasso had claimed him to be. He is best known for his children's books and as the illustrator of Jaroslav Hašek's World War I novel The Good Soldier Švejk. He's an author of over 15,000 illustrations (both colour and black and white) and more than 600 paintings. The main themes and motives of his work include the following: home village Hrusice, water goblins and sprites, night watchmen, pub fights and the traditional pig-slaughter.

== Life and work ==
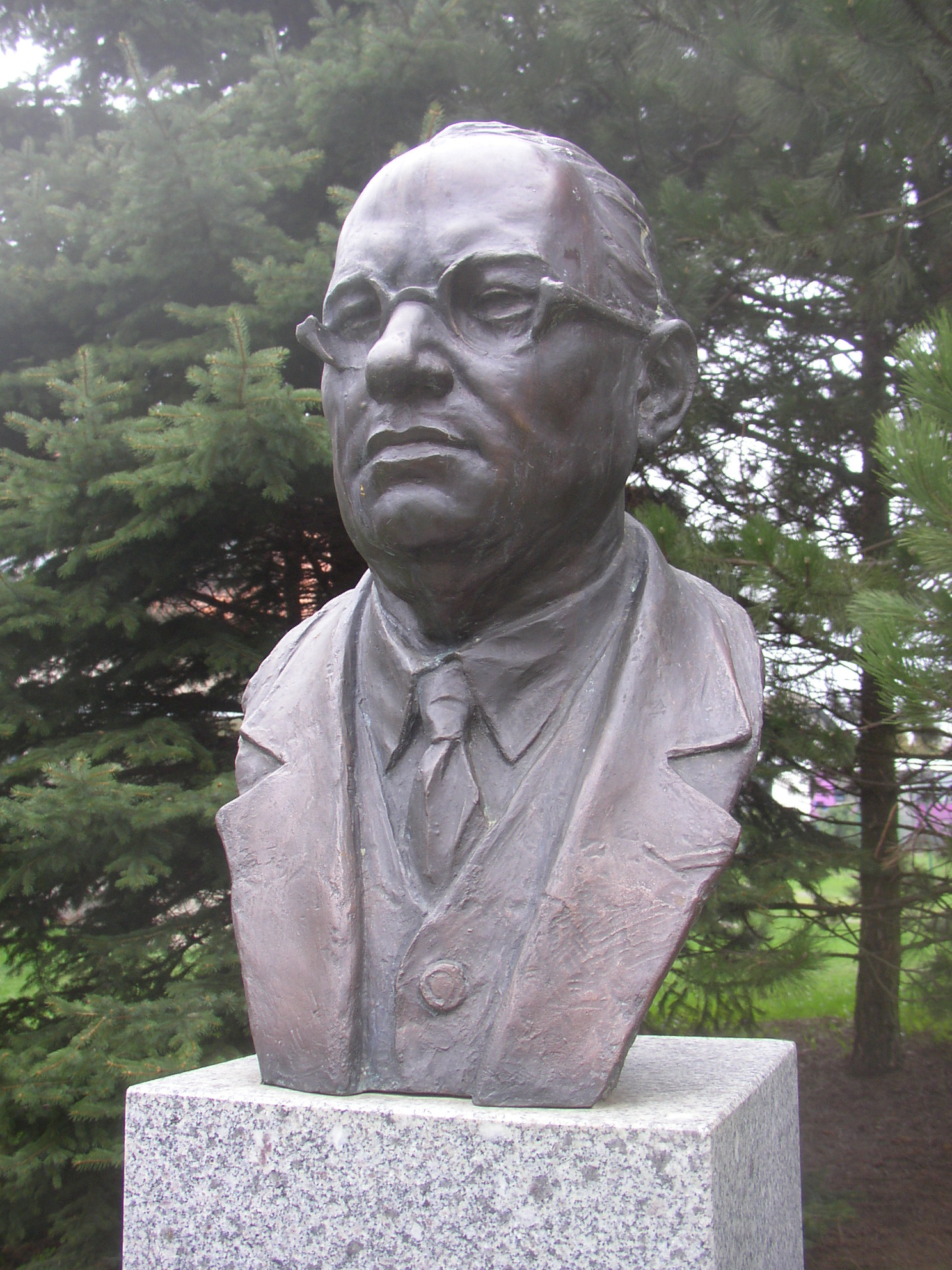
Bust of Josef Lada in Hrusice

Lada was born on 17 December 1887 in Hrusice, Bohemia, Austria-Hungary. He has produced many different types of works, including paintings, illustrations, cartoons, and pieces of writing.

Despite being entirely self-taught, Josef Lada became a respected artist in Czechoslovakia. Lada's work has become one of the Czech national trademarks and its popularity (among anyone aged 3 and up) does not seem to be declining. Since new pieces of work get discovered almost every year, the total number of his paintings is unknown. The last count shows, however, that this number is closer to 600 rather than 400 (which is what the previous official estimate stated).

The amount of his illustrations is even larger. There is estimated to be over 15000 pieces of work (black and white or colour) published in various fiction books, newspapers and magazines. Cartoons, including political satire, represent a very significant part of Lada's production. Despite being over 100 years old now, most of these sketches are still very popular (and relevant) today. Lada is one of the founders of the Czech cartoon and comic book tradition. The best example of his "illustrations for adults" is the drawings to complement the work of Jaroslav Hašek – especially his novel "The Good Soldier Švejk". In combination with Lada's illustrations, the text represents a piece of writing that is still getting published all over the world today. Josef Lada has made his mark as a writer as well. "The Chronicle of my Life" details his life and work. He's also written some Czech fairy tales such as "Mikeš – The Adventures of the Talking Cat", "Cunning Godmother Fox" or "Bogeyman and Water Sprites". He illustrated books of other authors as well, including Jan Drda, Karel Jaromír Erben and Božena Němcová.

== Books in translation ==
Josef Lada (author of text and illustration): Mikeš

- German translation: Otfried Preussler - Kater Mikesch. Publication date 1936, publisher Verlagsauerlaender
- English translation: Renata Symonds - Purrkin the talking cat. Publication date 1966, publisher Harrap

Josef Lada (author of text and illustration): O chytré kmotře lišce

- Japan translation: The story of a fox. Publication date 1966, publisher Fukuinkan Shoten
- Korean translation: The story of a fox. Publication date 1998, publisher BIR Publishing Co., Ltd.

== Interesting facts ==
- The Josef Lada and Alena Ladová memorial museum is placed in Lada's former house in Hrusice. It was first open in June 1986.
- There is an asteroid named Josef Lada (17625, 1996 AY1). It was discovered by P. Pravec and L. Šarounová from the Onřejov observatory, 14 January 1996
- Josef Lada's father was a shoemaker. At the age of one, little Josef fell over in his workroom and managed to hurt himself so unfortunately that he permanently lost sight in his right eye
- Josef Lada was the youngest of four children. He had a brother named František and two sisters, Antonie and Marie
- Lada's famous cut out Nativity scene got published 35 times
- To this day, there are 10 different versions of Lada's colouring pages
- Each year 6 to 8 different calendars are published
- Poet and a Nobel Prize laureate Jaroslav Seifert complemented Lada's illustration by his verses in book ... first published in 1956;
- His single largest monograph got published in 2008 by Slovart publishers. In reissue in year 2016
- His books is currently mostly published by the following publishing houses: Albatros, Grada, Dialog, Euromedia, Fragment, Albi, Slovart or BMSS Start
- The book "Mikeš", translated into German by Otfried Preussler, got the Jugendbuchpreis (book for young readers) award in 1963
- His illustrations to "Good soldier Svejk" set the main theme to the interior design of 22 Svejk restaurants located in cities all over the Czech Republic
- There's so called "Lada's Region", an area surrounding his birthplace in central Bohemia, that draws upon the painters legacy and tries to remain active in reminding its visitors of his work
- Lada had cooperated with a number of magazines (both Czech and foreign) and his drawings are still frequently used to complement various articles or the work of other artists (including musicians). Posters, calendars, postage stamps, theatre props and backdrops, LP, MC, CD, VHS or DVD covers, mugs, glass, grocery products, toys… you name it. Everything features the artwork of Josef Lada
- He had also cooperated with the Czech Radio and TV producers in the making of various films (documentary, live action and animated movies) and TV series "Mikes", "Cunning Godmother Fox", "Bogeyman and Water Sprites", "Nursery Rhymes", "John and the Lamb"
- To complement Jaroslav Hašek's "Good Soldier Svejk", Lada's drawn over 1350 illustrations (both colour and black and white). New editions of this book still get published in many countries all over the world. The 1956 animated (puppet) version of the movie "Svejk" by Jiří Trnka is considered a treasure of the Czech cinematography
- JosefLada.cz, s.r.o. has also been working with his legacy and work since 2014. founded by Josef Lada's great-grandsons – Martin and Viktor.

== Memorial House of Josef Lada and his daughter Alena ==
In Hrusice is a museum that presents Lada's life and work. There is also an exposition about his daughter Alena Ladová, who has followed in her father's footsteps and has become a painter and a children's book' illustrator as well.

== Gallery ==
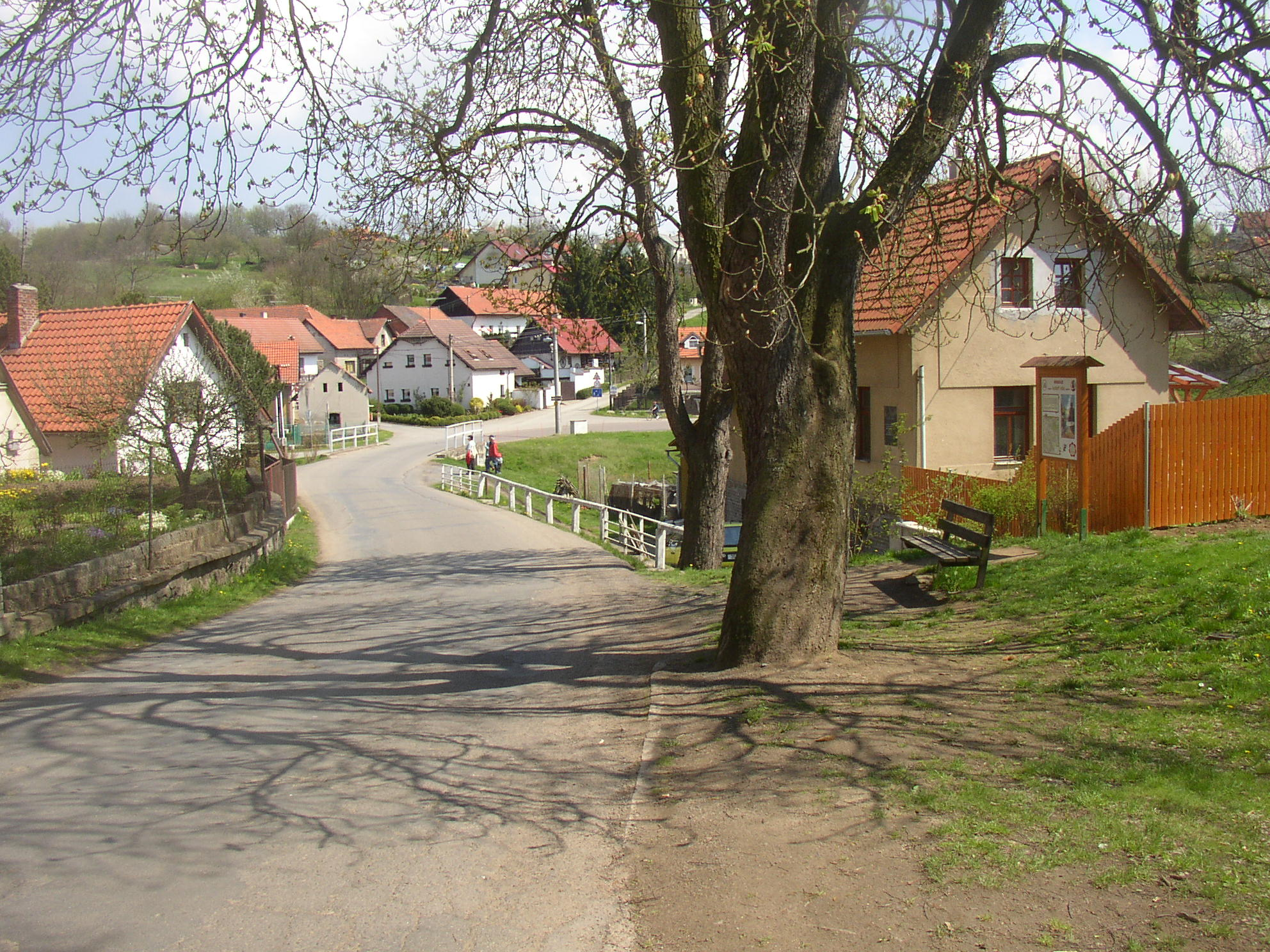
Birthplace of Josef Lada

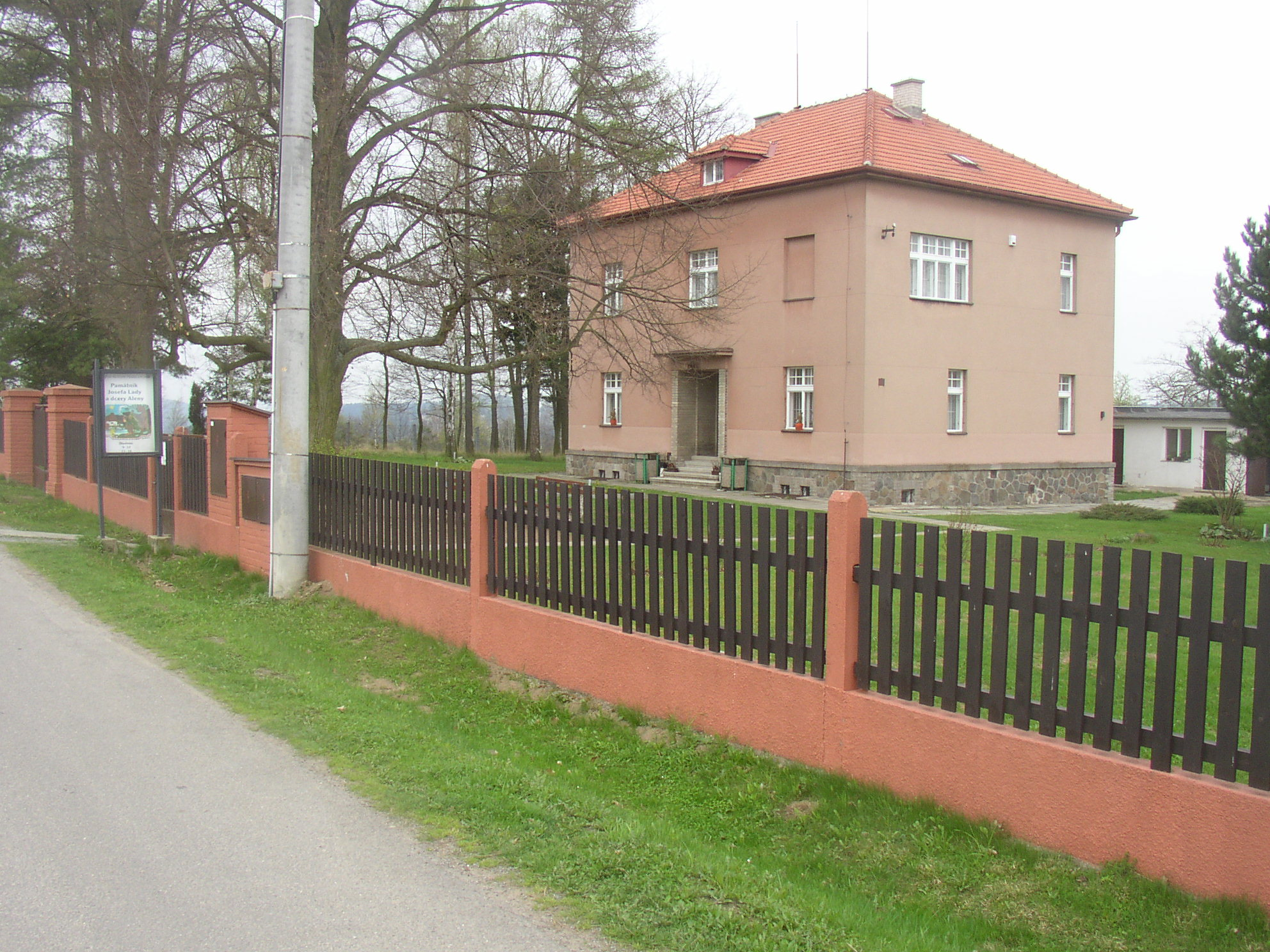
Lada's villa in Hrusice today houses his museum

One of the cartoons from The Good Soldier Švejk
