= Eva Klepáčová =

Czech actress

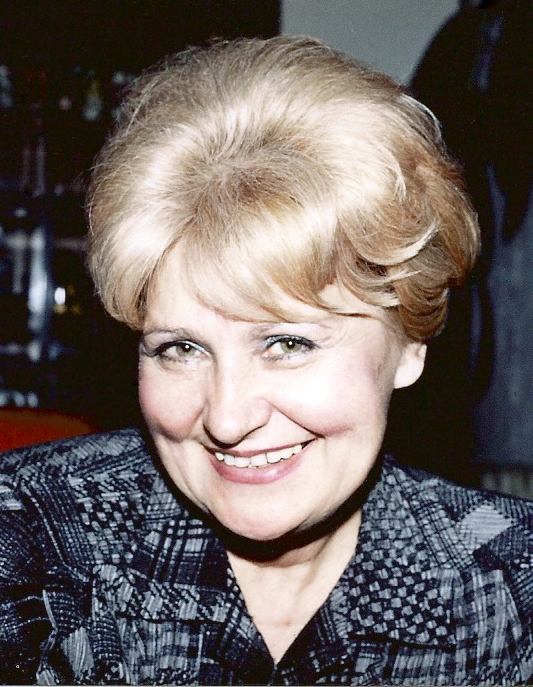
- Born: 2 May 1933; Prague, Czechoslovakia
- Died: 18 June 2012 (aged 79); Prague, Czech Republic
- Occupations: Actress, voice actress, presenter
- Years active: 1955–1996
- Spouse: Josef Zíma

Eva Klepáčová (2 May 1933 – 18 June 2012) was a Czech actress, voice actress and presenter. One of her best known film roles is the character Kate from Czech Fairy tale Playing with the Devil (1956) directed by Josef Mach. She was also well known as a dubbing actress. In 2007, The Presidium of the Actors Union presented her with the Award for Lifetime Achievement in dubbing. She appeared in 19 films and television shows between 1955 and 1996.

== Life ==
Eva Klepáčová was born Eva Beatrix Klepáčová on 2 May 1933 in Prague, Czechoslovakia (now the Czech Republic). Her father, Antonín Klepáč, was a dancer at the National Theatre, her mother Kamila Klepáčová (née Vlášková) was a freelance dancer and actress (she danced in the Vest Pocket Revue at the Liberated Theatre of Jiří Voskovec and Jan Werich). Klepáčová later married actor and singer Josef Zíma.

Klepáčová died on 18 June 2012.

== Career ==
As many other actors from Prague, Eva Klepáčová began her acting career in Disman's Children Art Radio Ensemble. After graduating from high school she studied at the Prague Academy of Performing Arts and she spent her first theatre season in the North Theatre in Liberec. Then she took permanent position in the Realistic Theatre of Zdeněk Nejedlý at Smíchov (now the Švandovo divadlo at Smíchov). Thanks to her nice voice and cultivated speech, Eva Klepáčová worked as an occasional presenter in Czechoslovak Television, practically from the very beginning of its existence. She applied her excellent voice disposition also in radio work and dubbing. Together with her husband, Josef Zíma, she successfully dubbed, among many others, the main character of Nastenka, from the Russian Fairy tale Jack Frost (1964). Zíma narrated her suitor Ivan.

== Selected filmography ==
- Cirkus bude! (1954)
- Playing with the Devil (1956)
- Slečna od vody (1959)
- Fantom Morrisvillu (1966)
- Dita Saxová (1967)
- Když rozvod, tak rozvod (1982)
- Já nejsem já (1971)
- Thirty Cases of Major Zeman (TV series; 1974)
- Jak básníkům chutná život (1987)
- Křeček v noční košili (TV film; 1987)
- Kolja (1996)
- Mach, Šebestová a kouzelné sluchátko (2001)
