= Vladimír Dvořák =

Slovak ice hockey player

- Born: April 18, 1985 (age 39); Martin, Czechoslovakia
- Height: 5 ft 10 in (178 cm)
- Weight: 179 lb (81 kg; 12 st 11 lb)
- Position: Defence
- Shoots: Left
- Slovak Extraliga team: MHC Martin
- NHL draft: Undrafted
- Playing career: 2007–present

Vladimír Dvořák (born April 18, 1985) is a Slovak professional ice hockey defenceman who played with MHC Martin of the Slovak Extraliga from 2007 to 2010.
