= Jestřebí (Česká Lípa District) =

- Municipality
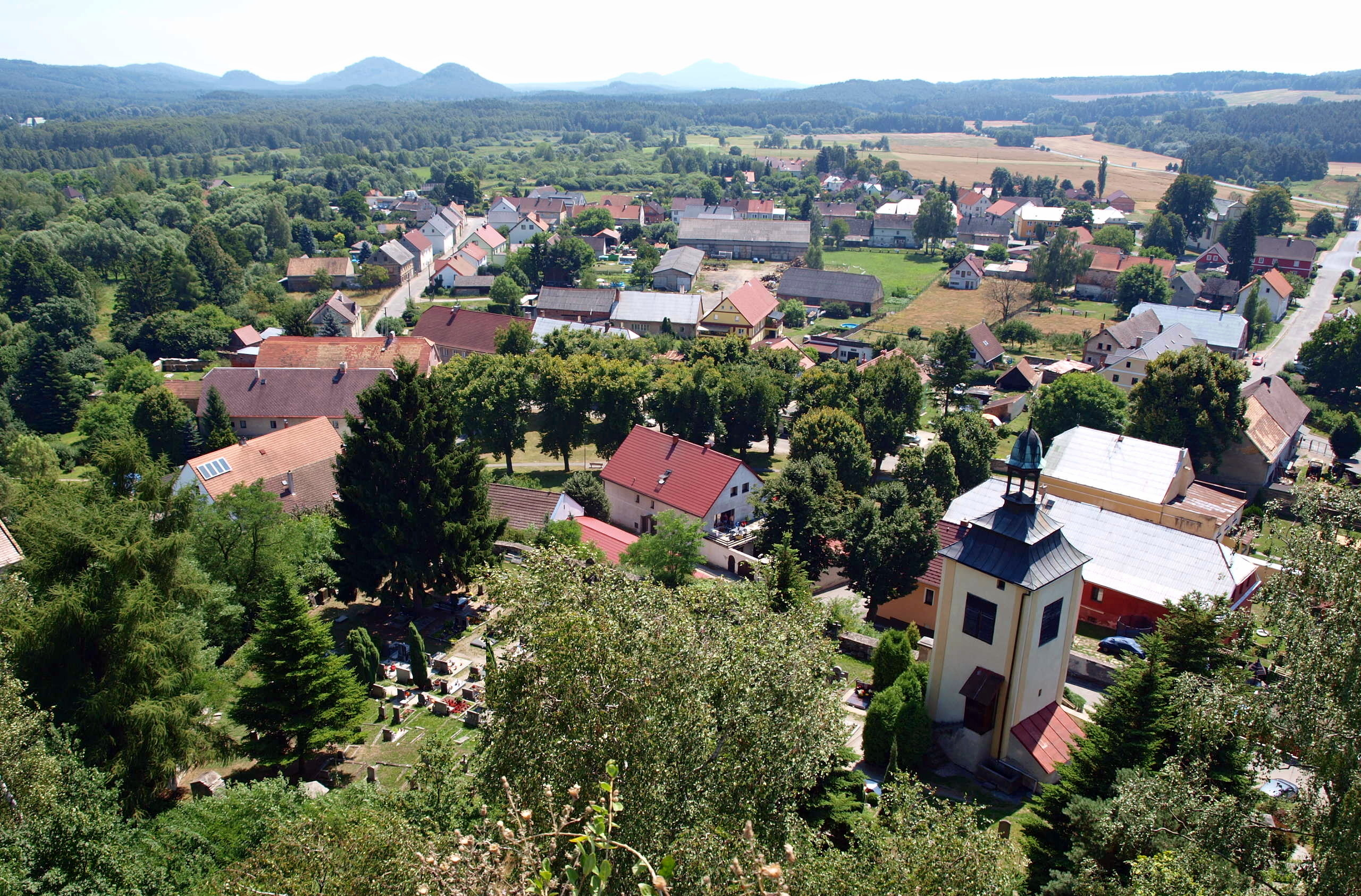
- Jestřebí seen from the Jestřebí Castle

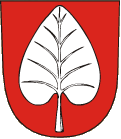
- Coat of arms

- Location in the Czech Republic
- Coordinates: 50°36′31″N 14°35′5″E
- Country: Czech Republic
- Region: Liberec
- District: Česká Lípa
- First mentioned: 1352

Area
  - Total: 22.13 km^{2} (8.54 sq mi)
- Elevation: 259 m (850 ft)

Population (2026-01-01)
  - Total: 857
  - Density: 38.7/km^{2} (100/sq mi)
- Time zone: UTC+1 (CET)
  - Summer (DST): UTC+2 (CEST)
- Postal codes: 471 61, 472 01
- Website: www.jestrebi.eu

Jestřebí (German: Habstein) is a municipality and village in Česká Lípa District in the Liberec Region of the Czech Republic. It has about 900 inhabitants.

== Administrative division ==
Jestřebí consists of three municipal parts (in brackets population according to the 2021 census):

- Jestřebí (641)
- Pavlovice (80)
- Újezd (46)

== Demographics ==
Historical population
Year	Pop.	±%
1869	1,301	—
1880	1,244	−4.4%
1890	1,098	−11.7%
1900	1,058	−3.6%
1910	1,065	+0.7%
1921	1,080	+1.4%
1930	1,298	+20.2%
1950	830	−36.1%
1961	835	+0.6%
1970	758	−9.2%
1980	752	−0.8%
1991	709	−5.7%
2001	770	+8.6%
2011	786	+2.1%
2021	767	−2.4%
Source: Censuses
