= Holany =

- Market town
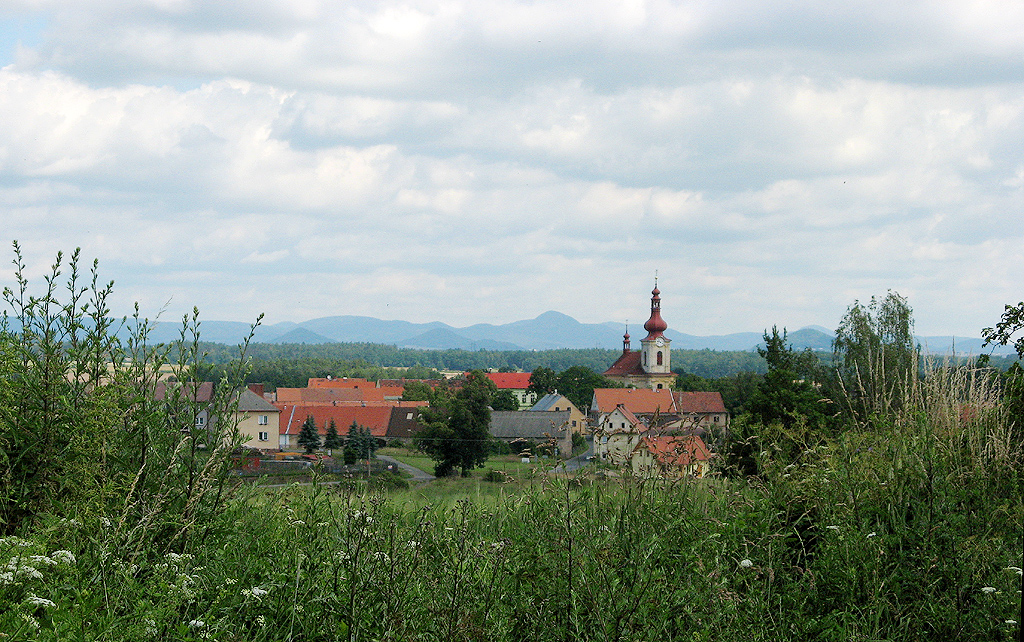
- View from the southwest

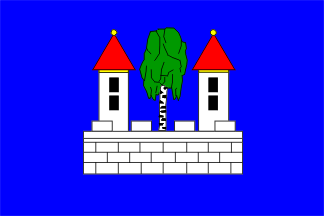
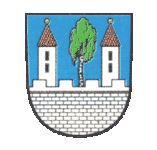
- Flag Coat of arms

- Location in the Czech Republic
- Coordinates: 50°37′5″N 14°29′35″E
- Country: Czech Republic
- Region: Liberec
- District: Česká Lípa
- First mentioned: 1352

Area
  - Total: 18.78 km^{2} (7.25 sq mi)
- Elevation: 265 m (869 ft)

Population (2026-01-01)
  - Total: 550
  - Density: 29/km^{2} (76/sq mi)
- Time zone: UTC+1 (CET)
  - Summer (DST): UTC+2 (CEST)
- Postal code: 470 02
- Website: www.holany.cz

Holany (Czech pronunciation: [ˈɦolanɪ]; German: Hohlen) is a market town in Česká Lípa District in the Liberec Region of the Czech Republic. It has about 600 inhabitants.

== Administrative division ==
Holany consists of five municipal parts (in brackets population according to the 2021 census):

- Holany (450)
- Hostíkovice (41)
- Loubí (31)
- Oslovice (10)
- Rybnov (26)

== Etymology ==
The name Holany means "the village of holans" in Czech. The term holan referred either to a person who came from a place called Holý (lit. 'bald'; a common name of hills and forests) or from holé (a type of forest with trees that are branchless at the bottom).

== Geography ==
Holany is located about 8 kilometres (5 mi) southwest of Česká Lípa and 56 km (35 mi) north of Prague. It lies in the Ralsko Uplands. The highest point is at 394 m (1,293 ft). The municipal territory is rich in fishponds. The southern part of the territory of Holany lies in the Kokořínsko – Máchův kraj Protected Landscape Area.

== History ==
The first written mention of Holany is from 1352, when it was owned by the Berka of Dubá family. It was probably founded around 1200. During the rule of King Charles IV (1346–1378), Holany was promoted to a market town. From the mid-15th century, it was a property of the Vartenberk family. Holany was a market centre until the beginning of the 19th century, but after the construction of new roads it lost its advantageous location and importance.

== Demographics ==
Historical population

Year	Pop.	±%
1869	1,330	—
1880	1,186	−10.8%
1890	1,060	−10.6%
1900	1,021	−3.7%
1910	991	−2.9%

Year	Pop.	±%
1921	938	−5.3%
1930	927	−1.2%
1950	498	−46.3%
1961	505	+1.4%
1970	428	−15.2%

Year	Pop.	±%
1980	401	−6.3%
1991	401	+0.0%
2001	480	+19.7%
2011	520	+8.3%
2021	558	+7.3%

Source: Censuses

== Transport ==
The I/15 road (the section from Česká Lípa to Litoměřice) runs through the market town.

The railway line Česká Lípa–Postoloprty passes through the territory of Holany, but there is no train station.

== Sights ==
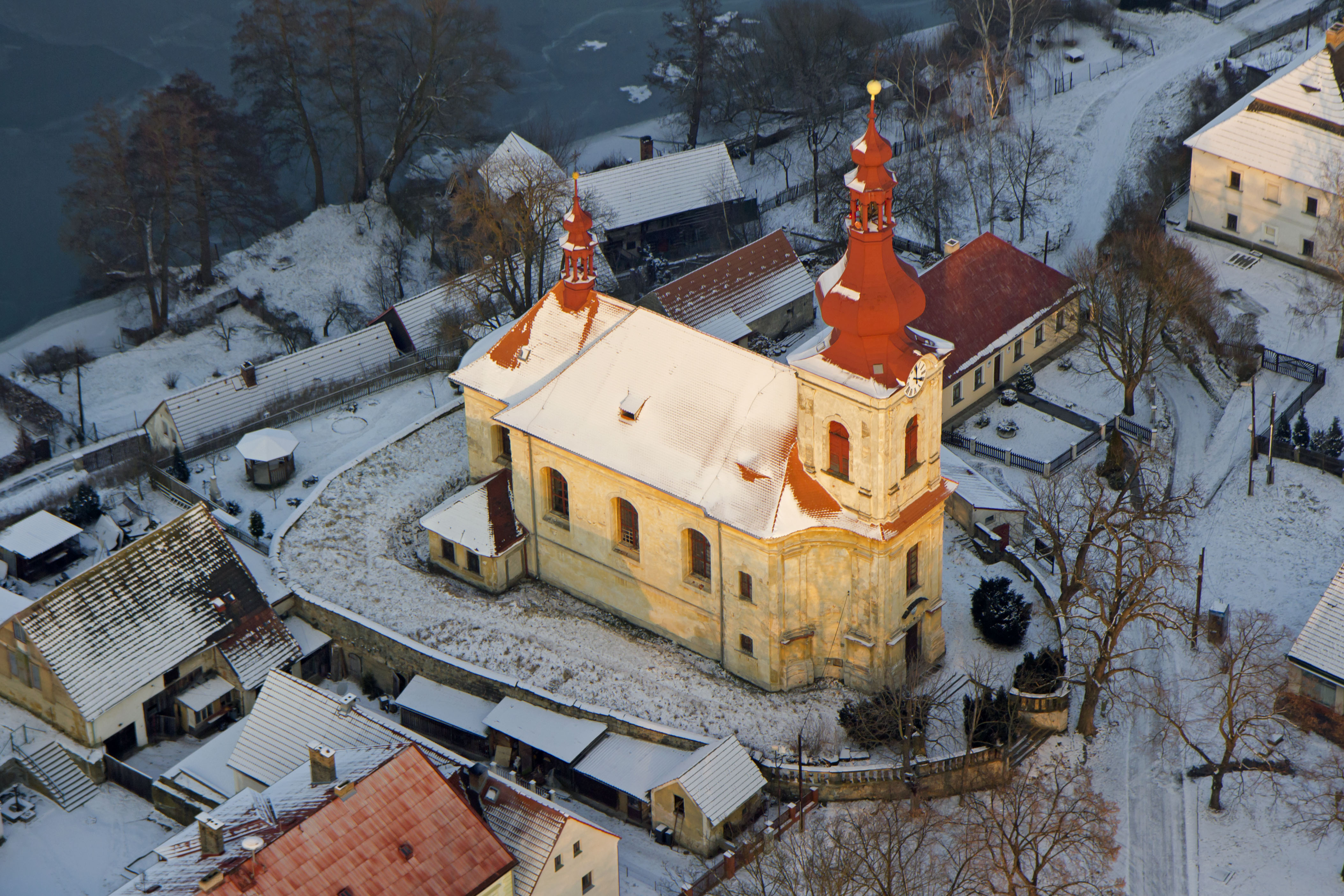
Church of Saint Mary Magdalene

The main landmark of Holany is the Church of Saint Mary Magdalene. It was built in the Baroque style in 1785–1788.

The Church of the Holy Trinity is located in Hostíkovice. It was originally a Gothic church from the turn of the 13th and 14th centuries, consecrated to Saint Catherine. In 1839, it was rebuilt and the consecration changed.
