= Vinohrady Theatre =

Theatre in Prague, Czechia

- Divadlo na Vinohradech
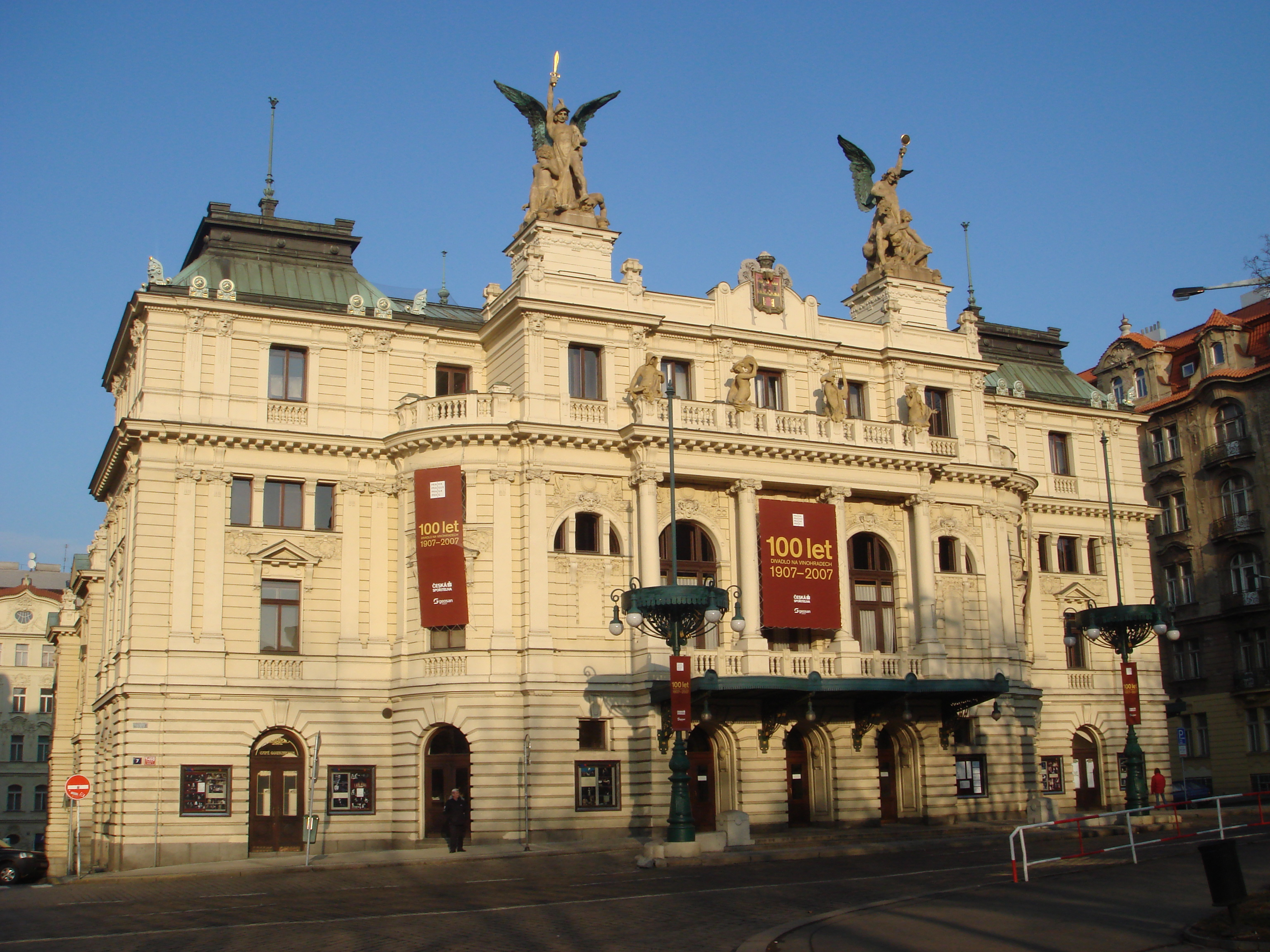
- Vinohrady Theatre
- Interactive map of Vinohrady Theatre
- Address: Náměstí Míru 1450/7; Prague 2 Czech Republic
- Coordinates: 50°04′35″N 14°26′14″E

Construction
- Opened: 1905

Website
- Official website

Vinohrady Theatre (Czech: Divadlo na Vinohradech) is a theatre in Vinohrady, Prague.

Construction began on February 27, 1905. It served as the Theatre of the Czechoslovak Army from autumn 1950 to January 1966. It contains a curtain painted by Vladimír Županský depicting a naked muse.

Playwrights associated with the theatre include Viktor Dyk who was active around 1915.

During the Velvet Revolution, where the Czechoslovak Socialist Republic was overthrown, there was a rally outside the theatre on the night of November 19–20; actress Vlasta Chramostová was quoted as asking the crowd: "If not now, when? If not us, then who?"
