= Synové a dcery Jakuba skláře =

Czechoslovakia TV series or program

- Genre: Drama
- Written by: Jaroslav Dietl
- Directed by: Jaroslav Dudek
- Country of origin: Czechoslovakia
- No. of episodes: 13

Production
- Running time: 55 minutes

Original release
- Release: 1986

Synové a dcery Jakuba skláře (The Sons and Daughters of Jakub the Glassmaker) was a Czechoslovak television programme which aired in 1986. The programme was directed by Jaroslav Dudek. The series depicts the fate of the glass-making family of Jakub Cirkl between the years of 1899 and 1957. In the life stories of the multi-member family dynasty, it was possible to uniquely capture the realities of the time and the characters of the individual characters. In 2011, it was announced that the programme, along with 17 others, would be released on DVD within the following three years.

== Plot ==
In 1899, a young journeyman glassmaker, Jakub Cirkl, arrives to the glassworks in Albrechtice. After a few days, it becomes clear that the glassworks has gained a true master glassmaker. However, since journeymen are always cheated by others, Jakub is reluctant to show his fellow workers how he makes the glass that has already proved so successful. It is only when his colleague Florián demonstrates that he is capable of figuring out the technique on his own that Jakub reveals his secrets to the other workers and becomes a fully fledged member of the glassworks team.

He falls in love with Terezka Herálcová, and the first episode ends with the New Year's Eve celebrations, during which Terezka tells him she is pregnant and Jakub asks Herálec for her hand in marriage.

Their lives are disrupted by the First World War, and Jakub is drafted into the army. When he returns, his wife Terezka dies in childbirth. Jakub now has seven children: Jakub, Terezka, Pepa, Vilemína, Toník, Anička, and Vojta. Fanynka, Terezka's sister, takes over the responsibility of raising the children and caring for the family, as her own sweetheart never returned from the war.

The family moves into a new house built by Jakub. Its members face many life-changing trials that unfold alongside the historical events that shaped the country at the time: the Great Depression, the Second World War (during which Toník is killed by the Nazis), the Communist takeover of February 1948, the 1950s, and more.

These events give rise to stories about people who search for their place in life, struggle, and have doubts, yet always find their way back to one another in the end, because family must stick together.

The thirteen-part series concludes with celebrations marking the centenary of the founding of the Albrechtice glassworks. During the festivities, Jakub publicly confronts Bořivoj Bošek, the current director of the glassworks, accusing him of informing for the Gestapo during the war and thereby causing the deaths of his son Toník, Florián, and other people from Albrechtice.

Bošek is arrested a few days later, and Jakub feels that he has fulfilled everything he still had to do in this world. He returns one last time to the glassworks where he began his career years earlier, and dies there by the furnace.

== Cast ==
- Ota Sklenčka as narrator
- Luděk Munzar as Jakub Cirkl
- Eva Jakoubková as Tereza Cirklová, née Herálcová
- Slávka Hozová as Fanynka Herálcová
- Petr Kostka as Jakub Cirkl (son)
- Jana Preissová as Terezka Cirklová (daughter)
- Jiří Krampol as Josef Cirkl
- Daniela Kolářová as Vilemína Cirklová
- Svatopluk Skopal as Toník Cirkl
- Marta Vančurová as Nanynka Cirklová
- Jaromír Hanzlík as Vojta Cirkl
- Petr Haničinec as Bořivoj Bošek
- Zdeněk Řehoř as Horyna
- Jana Štěpánková as Alžběta Krahulíková
- Radoslav Brzobohatý as director Hajný
- Oldřich Vízner as Kostrhún
- Bronislav Poloczek as Emil Krahulík
- Evelyna Steimarová as Marta
- Jiří Holý as Pertold
- Josef Větrovec as Schwalbe
- Václav Sloup as Divíšek
- Jiří Štěpnička as Ludvík
- Milena Steinmasslová as Boženka
- Jan Hrušínský as František
- Lenka Skopalová as Poláková
- Zdeněk Žák as Rosťa
- Julie Jurištová as Verunka
- Josef Bláha as master Matěj
- Stella Zázvorková as Krupková
- Hana Maciuchová as Líza
- Jaroslava Obermaierová as Miládka
- Zdeněk Martínek as Florián
- Ladislav Frej as Hugo
- Uršula Kluková as Blaženka
- Boris Rösner as Schlapke
- Petr Čepek as Vincek Krupka, manžel Vilemíny
- Radovan Lukavský as Glossmistr Ignác Krahulík
- Jaroslav Moučka as Herálec
- Světlana Nálepková as Soňa
- Miroslav Středa as Lojzík
- Jan J.Vágner as German soldier
