= Alois Švehlík =

Czech actor (1939–2025)

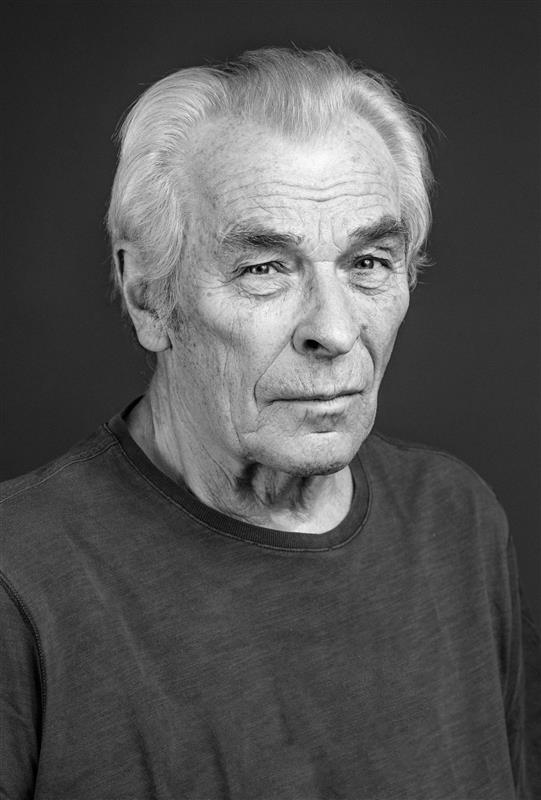
- Švehlík in 2019
- Born: 30 July 1939; Pardubice, Protectorate of Bohemia and Moravia
- Died: 2 April 2025 (aged 85); Prague, Czech Republic
- Occupation: Actor
- Years active: 1972–2025
- Spouse: Florentina Švehlíková (m. 1967)
- Children: David Švehlík

Signature
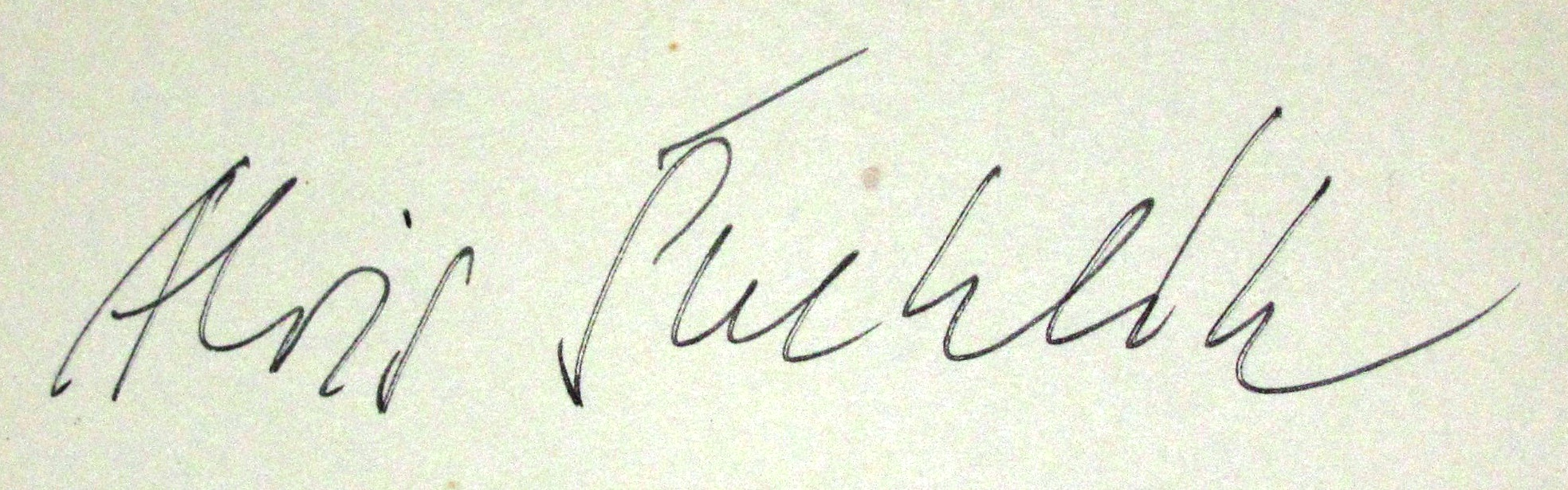

Alois Švehlík (30 July 1939 – 2 April 2025) was a Czech actor and theatre pedagogue.

== Early life and career ==
Švehlík was born in Pardubice, then part of the Protectorate of Bohemia and Moravia, in 1939. Together with his older brother Jaroslav, he became involved in theatre from an early age. He graduated from technical college in Chrudim in 1958 and after basic military service, worked briefly in a factory, where he met his future wife. Theatre was a constant draw for him, however, and Švehlík attempted to get into DAMU, unsuccessfully. Instead, he joined the Central Bohemian Theatre in Kladno, later doing acting stints in Most, Olomouc, and Liberec.

From the mid-1970s, Švehlík began appearing in film and television roles, including Sokolovo (1974), The Young Man and Moby Dick (1979), and Forbidden Dreams (1986). He gained prominence in the 1990s, appearing in numerous productions, including Černí baroni (1992).

In addition to acting, Švehlík lent his voice to various foreign productions, dubbing such works as The Professionals, Schimanski, Starman, Back to the Future II, The War of the Roses, and As Good as It Gets into the Czech language, winning several awards in the process.

Since 2004, Švehlík has been teaching drama at DAMU. He was a member of the National Theatre in Prague.

== Personal life and death ==
In 1967, Švehlík married economist Florentina Švehlíková (née Štěpánová). They had three children, including son David, who is also an actor. Švehlík appeared with his son in various productions in theatre, television, and film, as well as in dubbing and voice acting.

Švehlík died on 2 April 2025, at the age of 85.

== Awards and recognition ==
- František Filipovský Prize for Best Male Performance in dubbing As Good as It Gets (1999)
- Theatre News Award for Best Actor in Z cizoty (2004)
- František Filipovský Prize for Best Male Performance in dubbing The Secret of Santa Vittoria (2007)
- František Filipovský Prize for Lifetime Achievement (2014)
- Medal of Merit (2025)

== Film ==
List of film appearances, with year, title, and role shown
Year	Title	Role	Notes
1974	Sokolovo	Sergeant Hynek	
1977	Smoke on the Potato Fields	Petr Kodet	
1979	The Young Man and Moby Dick	Líbal	
1986	Forbidden Dreams	Spy	
1992	Černí baroni	Captain Honec	
2007	Operace Silver A	Krupka, Václav's father	
2011	Alois Nebel	Wachek Sr.	
2019	On the Roof	Professor Antonín Rypar	
2022	Emergency Situation	Brukner, war pilot	
2023	The Man Who Stood in the Way	Ludvík Svoboda	

== Television ==
List of television appearances, with year, title, and role shown
Year	Title	Role	Notes
1976	Muž na radnici	Karel Švehla	4 episodes
1977	Žena za pultem	David, taxi driver	1 episode
1979	Inženýrská odysea	Jiří Strnad	
1980	Thirty Cases of Major Zeman	Kornet	1 episode
1981	Okres na severu	Vízner	5 episodes
1984	Sanitka	Chief Magistrate of Prague	1 episode
1988	Panoptikum města pražského	Guard	1 episode
1990	Dobrodružství kriminalistiky	Ervin Gladstone, manufacturer	1 episode
2013	Burning Bush	Chief Horyna	3 episodes
2014	Czech Century	Alexander Dubček	
2017	Maria Theresia	Philipp Ludwig Wenzel von Sinzendorf	2 episodes

== Dubbing ==
List of dubbed productions, with year, title, and role shown
Year	Title	Role	Notes
1998	As Good as It Gets	Melvin Udall	
2002	Dempsey and Makepeace	Gordon Spikings	
