= Byl jednou jeden dům =

Czechoslovak television series

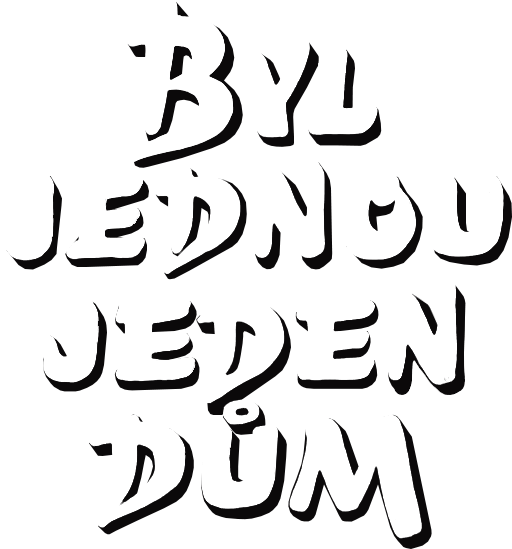
- Directed by: František Filip
- Country of origin: Czechoslovakia
- Original language: Czech
- No. of seasons: 1
- No. of episodes: 6

Production
- Running time: 70 minutes

Original release
- Network: Czechoslovak Television
- Release: 1975 – 1975

Byl jednou jeden dům (Once There Was a House) is a television series first broadcast 1975. It takes place in a house located in fictional Bagounova Street.

== Context ==
The series covers the period from 1936 to 1945, i.e. the period before, during and after the World War II. The series was popular thanks to the constellation of well-known actors, lively dialogues, intertwined stories and fates, but (in the context of normalization) also less ideological burden than was usual at the time. It affects feelings and patriotism, because significant moments such as the Prague uprising or repression during Reinhard Heydrich's tenure and after his assassination also appear in the series.

== Cast ==
- Miloš Nedbal as Alexander Nerudný
- Vladimír Ráž as Hektor Nerudný called Hekí
- Alena Vránová as Klára, Hektor's wife
- Josef Bláha as Achilles Nerudný called Aší
- Libuše Švormová as Berta, Achilles' wife
- Jiří Adamíra as Patrokles Nerudný called Páťa
- Josef Abrhám as Paris Nerudný called Párek
- Jiří Sovák as Matěj Budák
- Vladimír Menšík as Eduard Drvota
- Míla Myslíková as Terezie Drvotová
- Jiří Hrzán as Tutek Drvota
- Zuzana Ondrouchová as Majka Drvotová
- František Kovářík as dědeček
- Jana Hlaváčová as Anděla Hrachová
- Josef Vinklář as Arnošt Ticháček
- Jaromír Hanzlík as Martin Hrach
- Josef Somr as Josef Soumar
- Jaroslava Obermaierová as Růžena Soumarová – Nerudná
- Jiří Vala as Dlask
- Karel Höger as Vendelín Dalibor Ehrlich
- Libuše Havelková as Ehrlich's mistress called Madam
- Josef Větrovec as Václav Ulč
- Dana Medřická as Ulčová
- Eva Hudečková as Pipina Ulčová
- Jan Skopeček as Tvaroh
- Slávka Budínová as Tvarohová
- Václav Postránecký as Přemek Tvaroh
- Jan Libíček as Šťovíček
- Blažena Holišová as Šťovíčková
- František Němec as Walter
- Jana Šulcová as Jarmila Klabíková
- Marie Rosůlková as French language teacher
- Petr Čepek as Adolf Svárovský
- Svatopluk Beneš as Benetka
- Jaroslava Pokorná as Boženka
- Vlastimila Vlková as neighbor
