= František Němec =

Czech actor (born 1943)

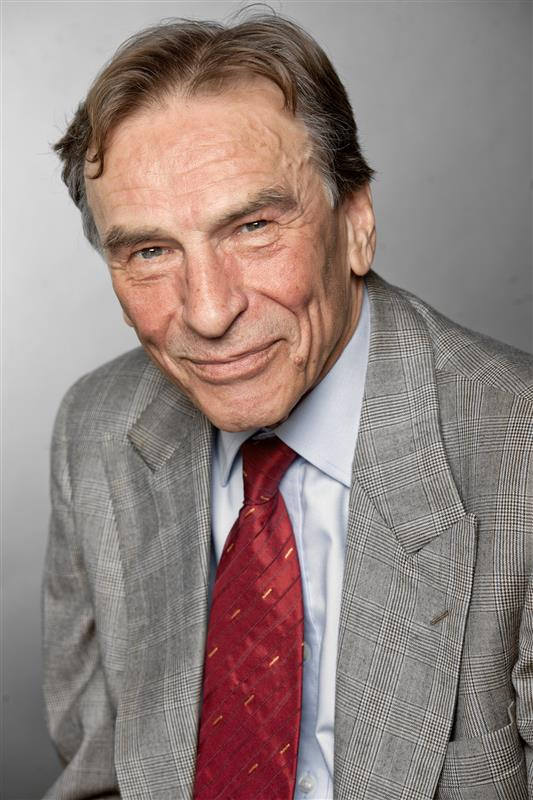
- Němec in 2013
- Born: 9 August 1943 (age 83); Sezimovo Ústí, Protectorate of Bohemia and Moravia
- Education: Theatre Faculty of the Academy of Performing Arts in Prague (DAMU)
- Occupation: Actor
- Years active: 1961–present
- Known for: Jak vytrhnout velrybě stoličku, Jak dostat tatínka do polepšovny

František Němec (born 9 August 1943) is a Czech actor, voice actor, and theatre pedagogue.

== Education and career ==
Němec studied acting at DAMU from 1960 to 1964 and has been teaching there since 1982. He went on to work at Městská divadla pražská, where he stayed until 1982. That year, he received an offer from theatre director Miroslav Macháček to take on the titular role in Shakespeare's Hamlet at the National Theatre in Prague. He remains a member of the National Theatre's drama company to this day.

In 1998, Němec won a Thalia Award for Drama – Men. In 2021, he received the František Filipovský Award for long-term acting mastery in dubbing, and a year later, the Thalia Award for Lifetime Achievement.

== Selected filmography ==
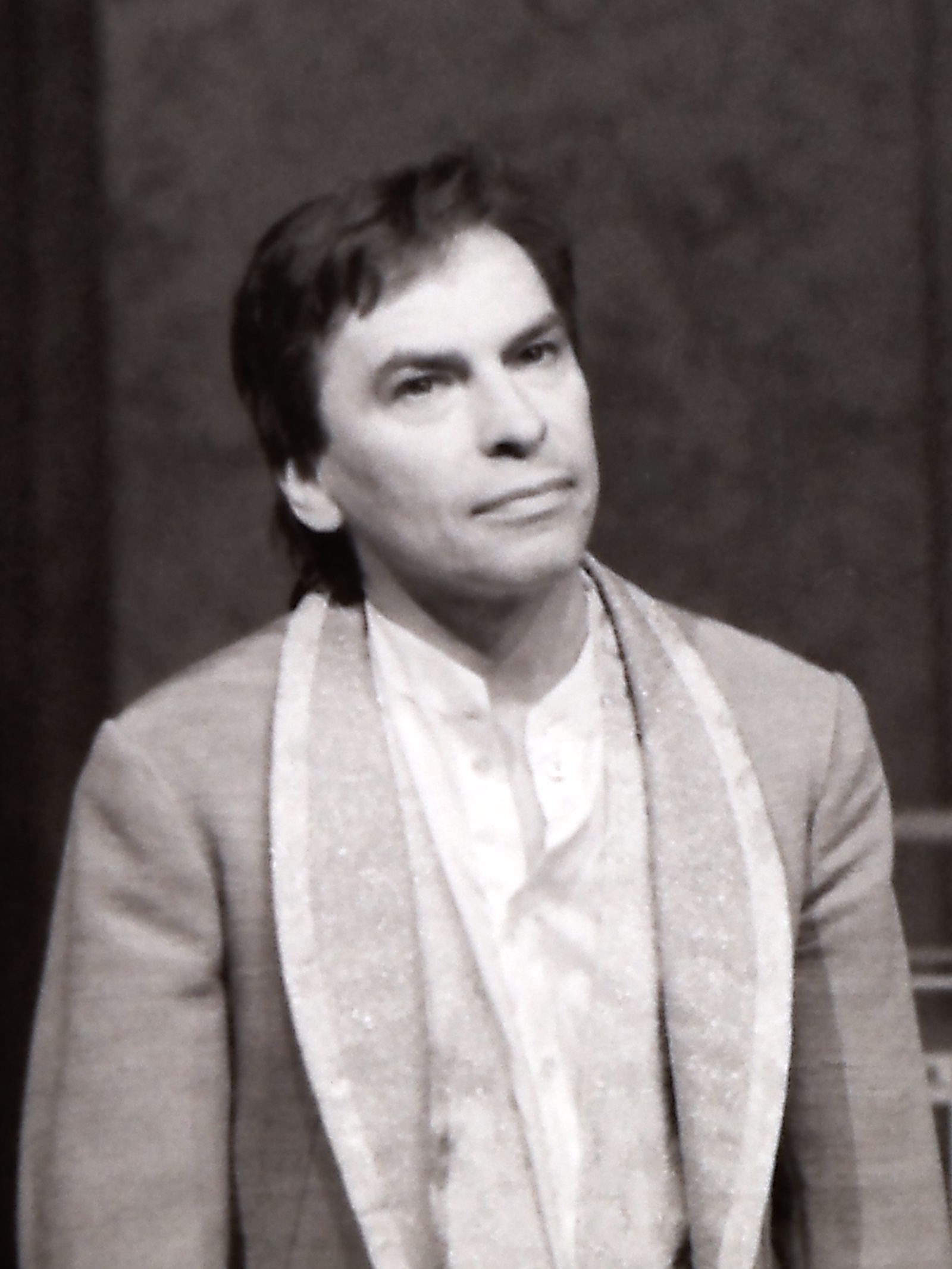
František Němec in 1988

=== Film ===
List of film appearances, with year, title, and role shown
Year	Title	Role	Notes
1962	Transport from Paradise	Dany	uncredited
1977	Dinner for Adele	Nick Carter	voice
1977	Jak vytrhnout velrybě stoličku	Luboš Rychman	
1978	Jak dostat tatínka do polepšovny	Luboš Rychman	
1980	Concert at the End of Summer	Kent	
1981	Ta chvíle, ten okamžik	Dr. Kodet	
1981	Mature wine	Urban	
1986	Young Wine	Urban	
1990	The Ear	Tajný	
2000	Loners	Hana's father	
2001	Rebelové	priest	

=== Television ===
List of film appearances, with year, title, and role shown
Year	Title	Role	Notes
1974	Byl jednou jeden dům	Walter from Sudetenland	5 episodes
1976	Muž na radnici	Jan Mikuláš	6 episodes
1976–80	Thirty Cases of Major Zeman	lieutenant Žitný	10 episodes
1978–81	Hospital at the End of the City	Dr. Řehoř	17 episodes
1984	Sanitka	Evžen Adamec	7 episodes
1988	Cirkus Humberto	Frans	11 episodes
1988	Třetí patro	František Beran	5 episodes
1989	Dlouhá míle	Cílek	6 episodes
1992	Náhrdelník	narrator	12 episodes
2000	Hotel Herbich	hotel director	13 episodes
2000–09	Oběti	psychologist	series of TV films–8 parts
2003	Hospital at the End of the City, Twenty Years On	Dr. Rehor	6 episodes
2005–08	Dobrá čtvrť	Svobodová's friend	9 episodes
2008	Hospital at the End of the City – The New Generation	Dr. Řehoř	3 episodes
2008–12	The Land Gone Wild	Večeřa	8 episodes
2010–12	Ach, ty vraždy!	Zdeněk Drtina	7 episodes
2011–12	Rodinka	Milan Hustopes	6 episodes
2013	Czech Century	Jan Patočka	
2014	Až po uši		1 episode
2014	Život a doba soudce A. K.	judge Zavadil	4 episodes
2016	Murder in Polná	Reichl	TV film
2021	Zločiny Velké Prahy	Dr. Málek	8 episodes
