= Tři chlapi v chalupě =

- Genre: Comedy
- Creative directors: Jana Dudková; Jiří Hubač
- Music by: Jiří Malásek; Jiří Bažant
- Original language: Czech

Production
- Production company: Czechoslovak Television

Original release
- Release: 18 October 1961

Tři chlapi v chalupě is a Czechoslovak comedy television series produced by Czechoslovak Television, which also broadcast during period 1961–1963.It was the second Czechoslovak series after Rodina Bláhova. 18 episodes followed by a special episode in 1964 were broadcast. Only four parts have been preserved until now. The series was filmed by several directors, František Filip directed the most episodes. The screenplay was the work of Jaroslav Dietl, Jiří Hubač, Ilja Prachar and Josef Barchánek. The plot of the series is devoted to stories from the lives of men of three generations of the Potůček family, who live together in one cottage in the village.

Thanks to the audience success, the TV series was followed by other works: a play of the same name from 1963 (including a book version) and two feature films, Tři chlapi v chalupě (1963) and Tři chlapi na cestách (1973).

== Story ==
In a cottage in the village of Ouplavice, representatives of three generations of the Potůčkov family, grandfather, father and son, among the locals called Potoci, live together. They experience a variety of situations and everyday problems in their lives, including rural communal politics and collectivized agriculture

== Cast ==
=== Main cast ===
- Lubomír Lipský as Václav Potůček, grandfather
- Jan Skopeček as Václav „Vašek“ Potůček, father
- Ladislav Trojan as Václav „Venda“ Potůček, son

== Production ==
The series was inspired by an earlier speech by President Antonín Zápotocký, who died in 1957. In it, he stated that although contemporary cultural works focus a lot on factories, they neglect agriculture. The topic was later picked up by television screenwriters led by Jaroslav Dietl, Jan Jílek and dramaturg Jana Dudková, who used the life of a farmer from South Bohemia who was an acquaintance of Jílke's to create the theme. Dietl remained the main author of the series, scripts for some episodes were also written by Jiří Hubač, Ilja Prachař and Josef Barchánek. Several directors took turns in the director's chair. It was started by Jaroslav Dudek, other episodes were directed by Miloslav Zachata, Jaromír Vašta, Václav Hudeček and Jiří Nesvadba, but most episodes were filmed by František Filip. Ladislav Trojan and Jan Skopeček were cast in the main roles of the three generations of the Potůčkov family, who had already collaborated with Dietl on the previous and very first Czechoslovak series Rodina Bláhova (Trojan in the main role, Skopeček only as a guest in one episode). The character of the youngest Potůček was originally supposed to be played by Ivo Palec, but due to illness he could not accept it, so the authors used Trojan. The chosen pair was completed by Lubomír Lipský in the role of Potůček's oldest grandfather, who had shortly before played the character of the grandfather in Dietl's stage play Four from the Big City. Although Lipský, Skopeček and Trojan were supposed to portray representatives of three generations, the oldest of them, Lipský, was 38 years old when the series began, and only nine years separated him from the youngest Trojan.

The series was broadcast live, so long rehearsals took place before each episode. The actors first rehearsed for three weeks in the rehearsal room of the Estates Theatre in Prague, followed by three days in the television studio. Filming took place in the Czechoslovak Television studio in Prague's Měšťanská beseda with three cameras. All activities and cooperation of individual professions, such as cameramen and editors, were rehearsed and firmly established during rehearsals. According to Jan Skopeček, such filming was even stricter than in the theater, and according to Trojan, there had to be discipline, so the actors did not improvise during the live broadcast.The pre-filmed exteriors were filmed in Nesvačily.

== Related media ==
Thanks to the success with the audience, various derivative projects were created under the baton of Jaroslav Dietl. In 1963, Dietl's comedy of the same name, based on the motifs of the series, premiered at the S. K. Neumann Theatre in Prague. It was directed by Václav Lohniský and featured Lipský (alternation Ladislav Šimek), Skopeček and Trojan (alternation Jiří Bednář). The game was published as a book in the same year by the publishing house Orbis. A photocomic based on the series also appeared in Zemědělské noviny, and the Czechoslovak Radio aired the program Speeches of Father Potůček to the Nation.

In 1963, the feature film of the same name was also made. After the end of the series, the creators intended to shoot new TV stories at one-year intervals, but in 1964, only one episode entitled "Three guys after a year" was realized. The last follow-up work was created in 1973 in the form of the feature film Tři chlapi na cestách.
