= Bohéma =

- Genre: Drama
- Written by: Tereza Brdečková
- Directed by: Robert Sedláček
- Country of origin: Czech Republic
- Original language: Czech
- No. of seasons: 1
- No. of episodes: 6

Production
- Running time: 72–94 minutes

Original release
- Network: ČT1
- Release: 15 January – 19 February 2017

Bohéma is a Czech historical drama television series about film stars of the First Republic during and after the Second World War, more precisely in a period 1938–1953. The first episode was watched by over one million viewers, but some historians and relatives of depicted characters pointed out some inaccuracies.

== Cast ==
- Michal Balcar and Ondřej Pavelka as dramaturg Arnošt
- David Novotný as Jaroslav Marvan
- Vladimír Javorský as Vlasta Burian
- Saša Rašilov as Oldřich Nový
- Adéla Petřeková as Adina Mandlová
- Michal Dlouhý as Zdeněk Štěpánek
- Petr Stach as Martin Frič
- Jaroslav Plesl as Miloš Havel
- Pavel Batěk as Otakar Vávra
- Petr Jeništa as Václav Binovec
- Gabriela Míčová as Nina Burianová
- Gabriela Mikulková as Alice Nová
- Lenka Vlasáková as Elena Hálková
- Václav Jiráček as Jiří Weiss
- Judit Bárdos as Lili Krallová
- Jan Hájek as Willy Söhnel
- Rostislav Novák as František Čáp
- Vladimír Polívka as Oldřich Papež
- Annette Nesvadbová as Arnošt's daughter
- Petra Jungmanová as Eliška Novotná
- Jan Novotný as Emil Vokolek
- Zdeněk Tyc as Vladislav Vančura
- Jiří Dědeček as Karel Hašler
- Tomáš Milostný as Jan Drda
- Martin Finger as Josef Opluštil
- Aleš Procházka as Karel Feix
- Martin Myšička as Vladislav Čaloun
- Renata Visnerová-Prokopová as Anna Letenská
- Vilém Udatný as Karel Höger
- Jiří Racek as Julius Fučík
- Aleš Bílík as Dušan Hubáček
- Jiří Ployhar as Martin Bouchal
- Tomáš Pavelka as Jan Roth
- Filip Čapka as illuminator
- Karel Dobrý as Václav Kopecký
- Jiří Čapka as Emil Hácha
- Tomáš Racek as Vítězslav Nezval
- Marek Pospíchal as Elmar Klos

== Production ==
Filming takes place in the ABC Theatre, Barrandov Studios and other locations in Prague, Mladá Boleslav and Plzeň.

== Episodes ==
No. in season	Title	Directed by	Written by	Original release date	Czech viewers (millions)
1	"Snad to nebude tak hrozné"	Robert Sedláček	Tereza Brdečková	15 January 2017	1.107
2	"Past na svědomí"	Robert Sedláček	Tereza Brdečková	22 January 2017	0.979
3	"Krev, půda a strach"	Robert Sedláček	Tereza Brdečková	29 January 2017	0.809
4	"A přece se točí"	Robert Sedláček	Tereza Brdečková	5 February 2017	0.797
5	"Vyhrát za každou cenu"	Robert Sedláček	Tereza Brdečková	12 February 2017	0.763
6	"Dvojí tváře"	Robert Sedláček	Tereza Brdečková	19 February 2017	0.812
