= Jaroslav Dietl =

Czech playwright and scriptwriter (1929–1985)

- Born: 22 May 1929; Zagreb, Kingdom of Serbs, Croats and Slovenes
- Died: 29 June 1985 (aged 56); Prague, Czechoslovakia
- Education: Academy of Performing Arts in Prague
- Occupations: Screenwriter; writer; playwright
- Known for: Inženýrská odysea
- Spouse: Magdalena Dietlová

Jaroslav Dietl (22 May 1929 – 29 June 1985) was a Czech television series writer, film and television screenwriter, and playwright working mainly during the Normalization period. He is known for such works as the coming-of-age drama Inženýrská odysea.

== Life ==
Dietl was born in Zagreb, Croatia, in 1929. In less than four years, however, he moved with his Czech parents and two sisters first to Borovany, and later to Brno. There, he attended primary school and in 1940–1944, he was a student at a grammar school in Brno. From there, he went to a textile industrial school, from which he graduated in 1949. Following this, Dietl studied at the Faculty of Arts at Masaryk University in Brno for a year, then worked as an apprentice teacher, also in Brno. He decided to leave Brno for Prague after getting a job at the Ministry of Social Welfare. In Prague from 1950 to 1955, he was a student at the Academy of Performing Arts, where he took screenwriting and dramaturgy. While still studying, he became the dramaturge of the newly emerging Czechoslovak Television. In 1962, Dietl changed jobs, moving to the Czechoslovak State Film Agency, eventually becoming a professional writer. In 1973, he was expelled from the Communist Party of Czechoslovakia. A year before his death in 1985, however, he was awarded the title of "Accomplished Artist".

== Work ==
Dietl is known mainly for his work on the television series Hospital at the End of the City, The Youngest of the Hamr Family, Muž na radnici, Plechová kavalérie, Žena za pultem, Okres na severu, Synové a dcery Jakuba skláře, and Frankenstein's Aunt, as well as the films Tři chlapi v chalupě and Nejlepší ženská mého života. Dietl wrote a number of plays, television series, and film scripts, and also published in the daily Mladá fronta and the magazine Dikobraz.

Dietl is considered to have been the first Czech writer to create multi-generational drama series, usually on a grand scale. The scheme of his narration was based on certain social environments, such as health, agriculture, industry, and trade, which framed the behaviour and relationships of his characters.

== Selected filmography ==
Film
Year	Title	Notes
1963	Tři chlapi v chalupě	
1968	Nejlepší ženská mého života	

Television
Year	Title	Notes
1961–63	Tři chlapi v chalupě	
1975	The Youngest of the Hamr Family	
1976	Muž na radnici	
1977	Žena za pultem	
1978–81	Hospital at the End of the City	
1979	Plechová kavalérie	
1979–2006	Inženýrská odysea	
1981	Okres na severu	
1985	Synové a dcery Jakuba skláře	
1987	Frankenstein's Aunt	
