= Jaroslav Satoranský =

Czech actor (born 1939)

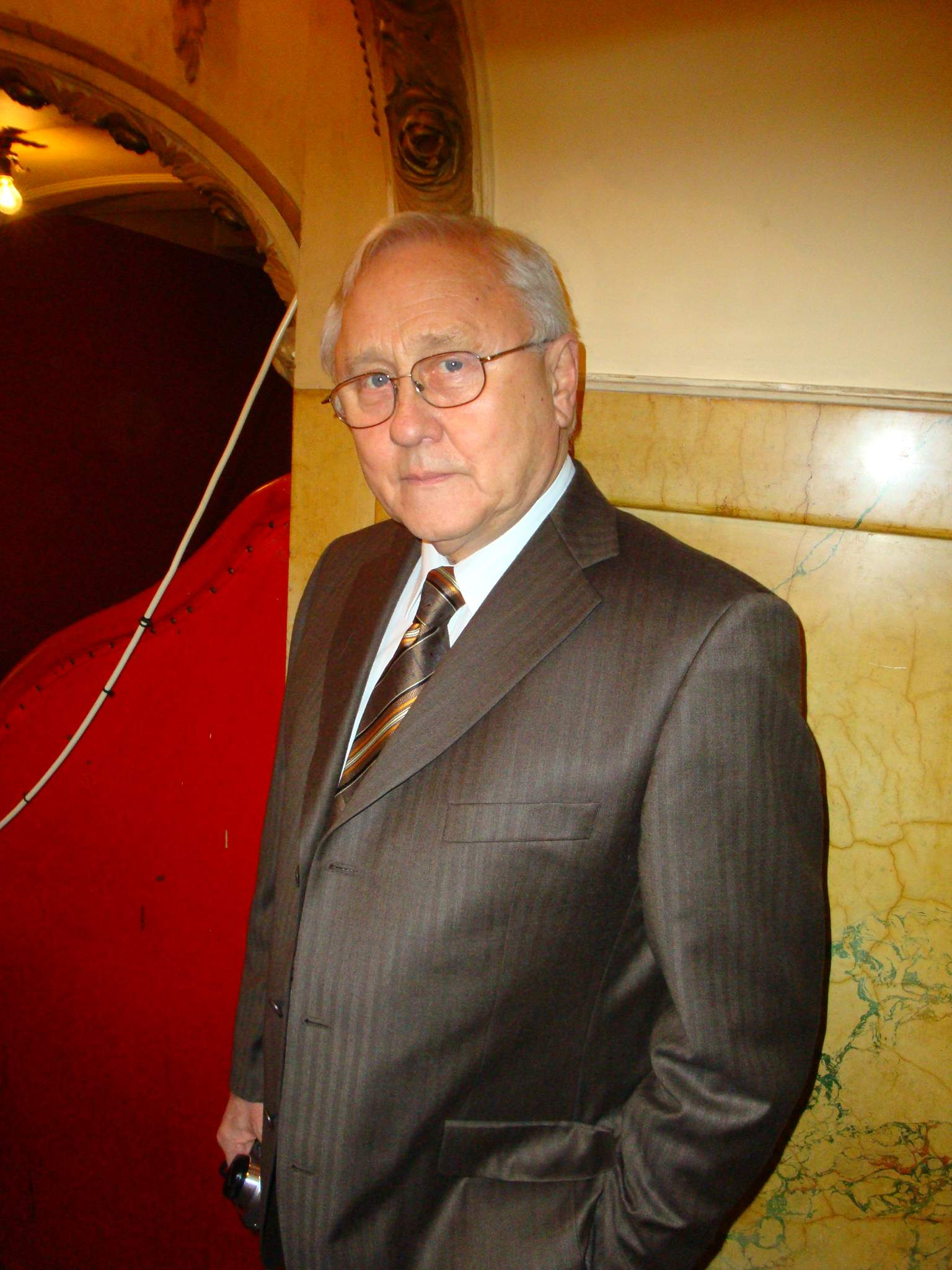
- Born: 17 December 1939 (age 85); Prague, Protectorate of Bohemia and Moravia
- Occupation: Actor

Jaroslav Satoranský (born 17 December 1939 in Prague) is a Czech actor. He belongs to famous Czech stage players and also to film actors.

== Biography ==
Jaroslav Satoransky finished his study of DAMU in 1961. After this he performed in a Kladno Theatre for a short time. Since 1966 he has been a member of Vinohrady Theatre in Prague.

== Selected filmography ==
- 2004 - Vražda kočky domácí
- 2004 - Četnické humoresky
- 2001 - Zdivočelá země
- 1998 - Legenda Emöke
- 1993 - Ze života hmyzu
- 1979 - Inženýrská odysea
- 1979 - Causa Králík
- 1978 - Tajemství proutěného košíku
- 1977 - Sázka na třináctku
- 1976 - Případ mrtvých spolužáků
- 1976 - Parta hic
- 1975 - Youngest of the Hamr's Family
- 1974 - Krkonošské pohádky
- 1974 - Případ mrtvého muže
- 1971 - F. L. Věk
- 1970 - Už zase skáču přes kaluže
- 1969 - End of a Priest
- 1969 - Záhada hlavolamu
- 1969 - Larks on a String (Czech: Skřivánci na niti)
- 1968 - The Sinful People of Prague (Czech: Hříšní lidé města pražského)
- 1967 - Dívka s třemi velbloudy
- 1963 - Bylo nás deset
- 1961 - The Day the Tree Blooms
- 1961 - Osení
