= Hana Maciuchová =

Czech actress (1945–2021)

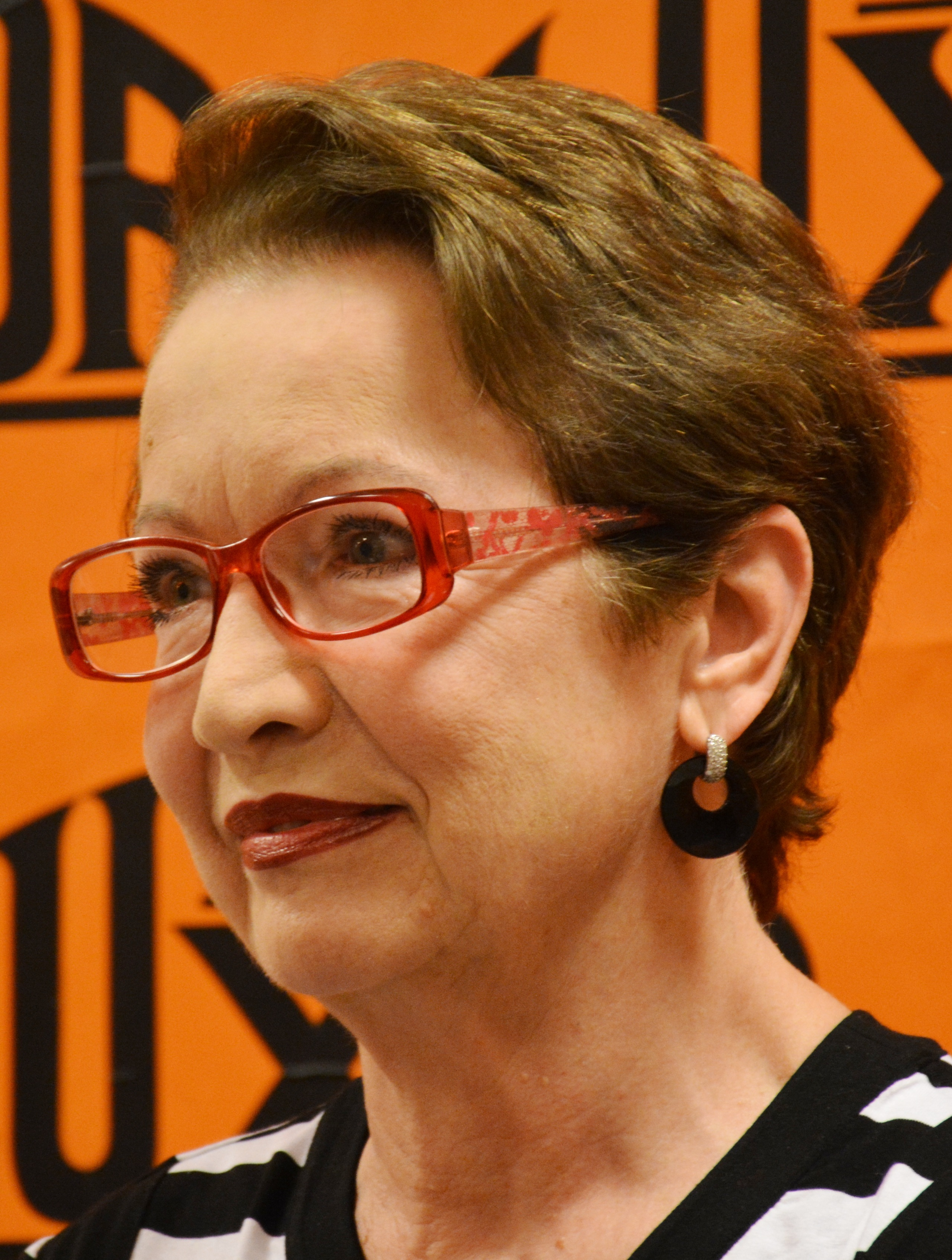
- Hana Maciuchová in 2015
- Born: 29 November 1945; Šternberk, Czechoslovakia
- Died: 26 January 2021 (aged 75); Olomouc, Czech Republic
- Resting place: Olomouc
- Occupation: Actress
- Years active: 1964–2018
- Partner: Jiří Adamíra

Hana Maciuchová (29 November 1945 – 26 January 2021) was a Czech actress. She often played in TV series. In addition to theatre, television and film, she was also intensively involved in voice acting and acting in radio plays, for which she was awarded many times.

== Biography ==
Hana Maciuchová was born on 29 November 1945 in Šternberk. Her parents were amateur actors. She studied at the Theatre Faculty of the Academy of Performing Arts in Prague, where her professors were Karel Höger and Radovan Lukavský. From 1971 to 2011, he was employed in the Vinohrady Theatre. From 2011, she was a freelance actor. She also worked as a teacher at the conservatory from 1994 to 2004.

He life partner was the actor Jiří Adamíra, who was 19 years older than her. They lived together for twenty years until his death, but did not marry.

Her first film role was in the film The Organ (1964). In films and theatre, she was often cast in the roles of strong, energetic or classy women. She often appeared in TV series and twice won the audience poll for most popular actress of the year. Throughout his acting career, she was among the busiest and most popular Czech radio actors. She won the Invisible Actor Award (for best radio artist in the Czech Radio of the year) in 1998, 2005, and 2010. She was also frequently involved in voice acting.

In 2010, Maciuchová was awarded by the Czech Republic's Medal of Merit (First Class) for services to the state in the field of culture.

She fought cancer for a long time towards the end of her life. She died in Olomouc on 26 January 2021, aged 75.

== Selected filmography ==
- Hrabě Drakula (TV film; 1970)
- And Give My Love to the Swallows (1972)
- Krkonošské pohádky (TV series, 1974)
- Chalupáři (TV series, 1974–1975)
- Žena za pultem (TV series, 1977–1978)
- Hospital at the End of the City (TV series, 1978–1981)
- Prázdniny pro psa (1980)
- Člověk proti zkáze (1989)
- Dobrodružství kriminalistiky (TV series, 1989)
- In the Coat of Lioness' Arms (1994)
- Loners (2000)
- Ulice (TV series, 2005–2015)
- Dobrá čtvrť (TV series, 2008)
- Patrimony (2018)
