= Hospital at the End of the City =

1978 Czechoslovak television series

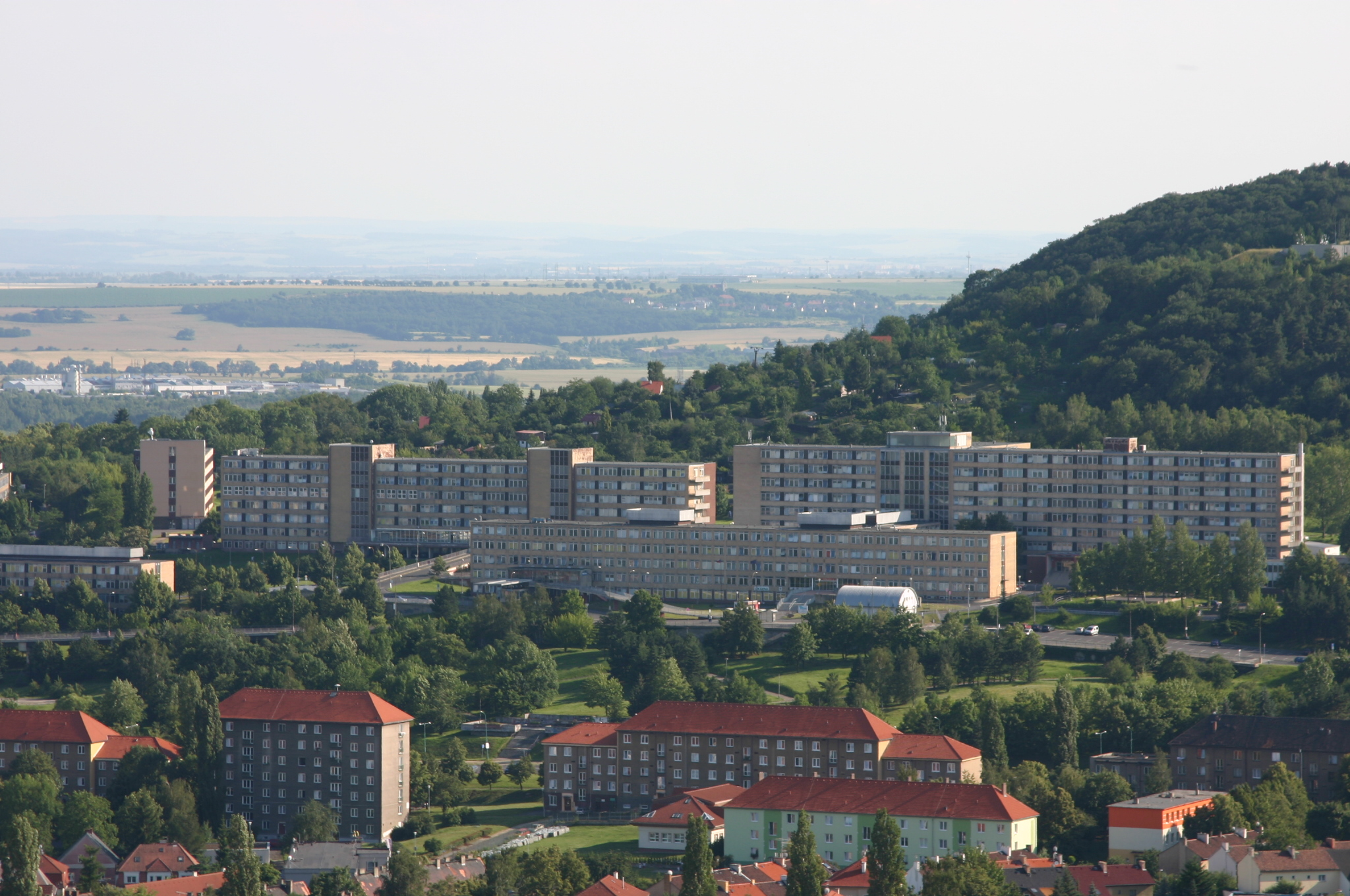
- Hospital complex in Most, one of the original filming locations
- Czech: Nemocnice na kraji města
- Genre: Drama; Medical
- Written by: Jaroslav Dietl
- Screenplay by: Jaroslav Dietl
- Story by: Jaroslav Dietl
- Directed by: Jaroslav Dudek
- Starring: Ladislav Chudík; Josef Abrhám; Eliška Balzerová; Ladislav Frej; Miloš Kopecký; Jana Štěpánková; Josef Vinklář; Iva Janžurová
- Composer: Jan Klusák
- Country of origin: Czechoslovakia
- Original language: Czech
- No. of seasons: 2
- No. of episodes: 20

Production
- Producers: Ivo Mathé; Petr Svejda
- Cinematography: Jindřich Novotný
- Editor: Jaroslav Kotlant
- Running time: 57 minutes
- Production company: Czechoslovak Television

Original release
- Release: 5 November 1978 – 30 December 1981

Related
- Nemocnice na kraji města po dvaceti letech; Nemocnice na pokraji zkázy

Hospital at the End of the City (Czech: Nemocnice na kraji města) is a Czechoslovak television series first released in 1978 by Czechoslovak Television. It featured an ensemble cast and received much viewer praise in Central Europe. The series, with a screenplay by Jaroslav Dietl and directed by Jaroslav Dudek, ran from 1978 to 1981 for a total of twenty episodes. The show's success inspired the German television series The Black Forest Clinic.

== Synopsis ==
The series follows Dr. Sova, head of the orthopedic department at a hospital in the fictional town of Bor, and his colleagues. It focuses both on their work and private lives.

== Cast and characters ==
- Ladislav Chudík as Dr. Karel Sova
- Josef Abrhám as Dr. Arnošt Blažej
- Eliška Balzerová as Dr. Alžběta Čeňková
- Ladislav Frej as Dr. Karel Sova Jr.
- Miloš Kopecký as Dr. Josef Štrosmajer
- Jana Štěpánková as Dr. Dana Králová
- Josef Vinklář as Dr. Cvach
- Iva Janžurová as Nurse Marta Huňková, later Pěnkavová
- Ladislav Pešek as Dr. František Vrtiška
- Oldřich Kaiser as Dr. Vojtěch Peterka
- Hana Maciuchová as Alena Blažejová
- Jaroslav Moučka as Kovanda, Alena's father
- Daniela Kolářová as Kateřina Sovová
- Josef Dvořák as Václav Pěnkava
- Vladimír Menšík as Josef Vandas
- Viktor Preiss as Přemysl Rezek
- Zdenka Procházková as Rezková, Přemysl's mother
- Josef Somr as hospital director Pekař
- Jiří Kodet as Bohun Bauer
- Kateřina Burianová as the kid sister
- Dana Medřická as Dr. Fastová
- Svatopluk Beneš as Dr. Fastová's husband
- Dagmar Veškrnová as Kabíčková
- Věra Tichánková as Nurse Trochtová
- Stella Zázvorková as Růžena Dobiášova
- Martin Růžek as Dr. Petr Chalaba
- Ota Sklenčka as University dean
- Jana Andresíková as Karel Sova's dissertation reviewer
- Květa Fialová as the dean's secretary
- Antonín Molčík as secretary of the hockey team
- Jiří Adamíra as associate professor Hybner
- Karel Effa as hospital attendant
- Zdeněk Dítě as restaurant server

== Production and release ==
Initial filming began in 1976 with Karel Höger in the lead role of Dr. Sova, but the actor died suddenly in 1977, and was replaced by Slovak actor Ladislav Chudík. The show premiered on 5 November 1978 and was met with great success, both in Czechoslovakia and Germany, after being broadcast in 21 countries. After the first season, which consisted of thirteen episodes, another season was commissioned, for a further seven episodes. In addition to fictionalized portrayals of hospital activity, the series contained footage of authentic surgeries, mainly in the field of orthopedics.

== Sequels and parody ==
A sequel series was developed in 2003, called Hospital at the End of the City, Twenty Years On (Czech: Nemocnice na kraji města po dvaceti letech), starring most of the original cast. Thirteen episodes were produced. In 2008, another set of thirteen episodes followed, this time under the title Hospital at the End of the City – The New Generation (Czech: Nemocnice na kraji města – nové osudy).

In 1999, a parody series titled Hospital on the Verge of Destruction (Czech: Nemocnice na pokraji zkázy) came out.
