= The Prague Mysteries =

Czech crime television series

- Genre: Crime
- Written by: Petr Zikmund; Jan Drbohlav; Zdeněk Zapletal; Ivan Hejna
- Directed by: Jaroslav Brabec
- Starring: Jaroslav Plesl; Jiří Langmajer; Denis Šafařík
- Country of origin: Czech Republic
- Original language: Czech
- No. of seasons: 1
- No. of episodes: 10

Production
- Running time: 60-69 minutes

Original release
- Network: Czech Television
- Release: January 31 – April 4, 2021

The Prague Mysteries (The Crimes of Greater Prague) is a Czech crime television series. The series takes place in 1922, in the period when central Prague merged with thirty-eight cities to create Great Prague. However, according to the creators, the individual stories are meant to sound simultaneously. The series has ten parts and is directed by Jaroslav Brabec. Writer and historian Michal Dlouhý who also worked on the script of Četnické humoresky, collaborated on the series.

The main roles were played by Jaroslav Plesl, Jiří Langmajer and Denis Šafařík. The first episode of the series was broadcast by station ČT1 on 31 January 2021. The last episode aired on Sunday, 4 April 2021.

The series has streamed at Amazon Prime as The Prague Mysteries. On 5 March 2026, Michal Dlouhý confirmed the series was renewed for a second season which is in pre-production.

== Cast ==
- Jaroslav Plesl as chief inspector Hynek Budík
- Jiří Langmajer as district inspector Rudolf Havlík
- Denis Šafařík as police agent Martin Nováček
- Lenka Vlasáková as Ilona Budíková, Budík's wife
- Darija Pavlovičová as Julie Budíková, Budík's daughter
- Sabina Rojková as Sisi, Budík's stepdaughter
- Lucie Žáčková as Toni, close friend of Inspector Havlík
- Ildikó Vargová as Enikő, servant of the Budík family
- Mira Štěpánová as Pavlínka, inspector Havlík's young charge
- Jiří Bartoška as police president Antonín Král
- Miroslav Táborský as chief commissioner
- Ondřej Malý as chief inspector Braun
- František Němec as doctor Málek
- Jiří Lábus as pathologist
- Josef Carda as judge
- Predrag Bjelac as baron Milotín
- Martin Myšička as JUDr. Herman Herzog
- Jiří Roskot as Pavel Drábek
- Miroslav Horský as driver Neužil
- Anita Krausová as prostitute
- Martina Babišová as prostitute
- Václav Jiráček as Milan
