= Nejlepší ženská mého života =

1968 Czechoslovak comedy film

- Directed by: Martin Frič
- Written by: Jaroslav Dietl; Martin Frič
- Starring: Jiří Sovák
- Cinematography: Jan Roth
- Edited by: Jan Kohout
- Release date: 1968
- Running time: 86 minutes
- Country: Czechoslovakia
- Language: Czech

Nejlepší ženská mého života is a 1968 Czechoslovak comedy film directed by Martin Frič as his final film.

== Cast ==
- Jiří Sovák as Láda
- Milena Dvorská as Kaplanová
- Jarmila Smejkalová as Jirina
- Iva Janžurová as Blanka
- Ivanka Devátá as Marta
- Čestmír Řanda as Kaderábek
- Vladimír Hlavatý as Koula
- Nina Popelíková as Zouharová
- Věra Tichánková as Honzíková
