= Plechová kavalérie =

Czechoslovak television series

- Genre: Drama
- Created by: Jaroslav Dietl
- Screenplay by: Jaroslav Dietl
- Directed by: Jaroslav Dudek
- Starring: Vlastimil Hašek; Jan Hartl; Vladimír Menšík; Jaromír Hanzlík; Jan Hrušínský; Jaroslav Moučka; Václav Sloup; Jiří Samek; Lenka Kořínková; Libuše Geprtová; Vladimír Hlavatý; Marie Motlová; František Filipovský
- Composer: Zdeněk Marat
- Country of origin: Czechoslovakia
- Original languages: Czech; Slovak
- No. of seasons: 1
- No. of episodes: 7

Production
- Camera setup: Jindřich Novotný
- Running time: 45 min

Original release
- Network: Czechoslovak Television
- Release: 1 December – 25 December 1979

Plechová kavalérie (English: "Steel Cavalry") is a Czechoslovak television series about combine operators, created by Jaroslav Dietl and directed by Jaroslav Dudek.

== Background ==
Before 1989, many farms in Czechoslovakia did not have enough combine harvesters for the harvest season. They borrowed them from STS (Strojní a Traktorová Stanice), the "Machine and Tractor Station". A route was planned, and the groups of combine harvesters started in the east and harvested farms on the way home. This is the story of one of those groups, from Nepomuk in the Plzeň Region.

== Cast and characters ==
- Jan Hartl as Vít Kubánek
- Jaroslav Moučka as Kahovec
- Vladimír Menšík as Holeček
- Jaromír Hanzlík as Vilda Muclinger
- Vlastimil Hašek as Pravoslav Žížka
- Lenka Kořínková as Zuzana Šímová
- Jan Hrušínský as Ludvík Kupec
- Jiří Samek as Bohouš Straka
- Václav Sloup as Jindra Kužela
- Libuše Geprtová as Lída
- Vladimír Hlavatý as Knížek
- Marie Motlová as Knížková
- František Filipovský as Litera
