= Hana Krampolová =

Czech actress (1961–2020)

- Born: 12 June 1961; Prague, Czechoslovakia
- Died: 3 August 2020 (aged 59); Prague, Czech Republic
- Occupations: teacher-governess, actress

Hana Krampolová (12 June 1961 – 3 August 2020) was a Czech actress. She was the wife of the actor Jiří Krampol.

Krampolová died in Prague on 3 August 2020, aged 59.
