= Kriminálka Anděl =

Czech crime drama television series

- Genre: Crime drama
- Directed by: Gejza Dezorz, Peter Bebjak, Róbert Šveda
- Starring: Martin Stropnický; David Švehlík; Marek Taclík; Ivana Chýlková; Ladislav Frej; Michal Novotný
- Country of origin: Czech Republic
- Original languages: Czech, Slovak
- No. of seasons: 5
- No. of episodes: 77 (list of episodes)

Production
- Producer: D.N.A. Productions
- Running time: 60 minutes

Original release
- Network: TV Nova
- Release: 2008

Kriminálka Anděl is a Czech crime drama television series which premiered on TV Nova in 2008. This TV series is a remake of the Slovak crime series Mesto tieňov.

== Plot ==
A police department in Prague, Czech Republic solves crimes of passion and premeditated murders.

== Production ==
First season was shot as a co-production between Czech channel TV Nova and Slovak channel TV Markíza. Since the second season, the series was shot by TV Nova only, without Slovak co-production.

== Cast and characters ==
- Martin Stropnický as major Ivan Tomeček
- David Švehlík as captain Tomáš Benkovský
- Marek Taclík as captain Oliver Hajn
- Michal Novotný as technical writer Rudolf Uhlíř
- Helena Dvořáková as psychologist Jana Chládková
- Ladislav Frej as pathologist Karel Benkovský
- Miloslav Mejzlík as colonel Milan Horák
- Ivana Chýlková as lieutenant colonel Dagmar Kopecká (since season 3)
- Ladislav Hrušovský as Sergej Kopriva
- Zlata Adamovská as colonel Věra Beránková (since season 4)
- Jana Pidrmanová as Lída Rysová (since season 4)
