= Krkonošské pohádky =

- Written by: Božena Šimková
- Directed by: Věra Jordánová
- Starring: František Peterka, Ilja Prachař
- Country of origin: Czechoslovakia
- Original language: Czech
- No. of seasons: 3
- No. of episodes: 20

Production
- Editors: Jiřina Lukešová, Jiří Brožek
- Running time: 10 minutes

Original release
- Network: Czechoslovak Television
- Release: 30 April 1974 – 1 February 1986

Krkonošské pohádky (literally Giant Mountains' Fairy Tales) is a Czech children's television series about Krakonoš, the mythical ruler of the Giant Mountains. It was filmed by director Věra Jordánová for Czechoslovak Television. It consists of 20 ten-minute episodes, the first seven of which were created in 1973 (broadcast in 1974, episodes 1 to 7), the next six in 1977 (broadcast in 1978, first as episodes 8 to 13, after the completion of the third series ranked as 8. to episodes 12 and 20) and the last seven in 1984 (broadcast 1986, episodes 13 to 19). In February 2013, based on the audience poll, he became the best Večerníček series.

== Plot ==
Plots of the individual parts are based on practically the same principle: The greedy and evil Trautenberk will try to gain some advantage at the expense of his large and powerful neighbor Krakonoš. He is punished by Krakonoš for this. In his plans, Trautenberk usually involves his servants who just don't like to fulfill his orders and therefore Krakonoš doesn't punish them. There are practically no episodic characters in the series, the only exception being the jay, which regularly brings information to Krakonoš about Trautenberk's plans.

== Cast ==
- František Peterka as Krakonoš
- Ilja Prachař as Trautenberk
- Zdeněk Řehoř as hajnej
- Hana Maciuchová as Anče
- Jaroslav Satoranský as Kuba
- Bohuš Záhorský as narrator
- Martin Růžek as narrator (episodes 13–19)

== Episodes ==
1. Jak Trautenberk lovil v Krakonošově revíru
2. Jak Trautenberk chtěl peříčko z Krakonošovy sojky
3. Jak Trautenberk topil Krakonošovým dřevem
4. Jak Kuba utekl ke Krakonošovi
5. Jak Trautenberk vystrojil hostinu pro štěpanického barona
6. Jak šel Kuba ke Krakonošovi pro poklad
7. Jak chtěl Trautenberk Krakonošovo koření
8. Jak Trautenberk kradl zvířátkům zásoby na zimu
9. Jak Trautenberk vyměnil Krakonošovi fajfku
10. Jak chtěl Trautenberk nový kožich
11. Jak šel Trautenberk do hor pro poklad
12. Jak Trautenberk sušil Krakonošovi louku
13. Jak chtěl Trautenberk poslat Kubu na vojnu
14. Jak si Trautenberk pochutnal na čerstvých pstruzích
15. Jak Trautenberk pořádal vepřové hody
16. Jak Trautenberk chytal ptáčky zpěváčky
17. Jak Trautenberk otrávil strakatou kozu
18. Jak Trautenberk odvedl horské prameny
19. Jak se chtěl Trautenberk pomstít Krakonošovi
20. Jak Trautenberk prodával vodu

After creating two seasons, the series ended with the 13th episode Jak Trautenberk prodával vodu (How Trautenberk sold water). After the filming of the third season, this episode, which ends the whole story, was moved to the 20th position among episodes.

== Original and sequel ==
The author of the script was the writer and translator Božena Šimková, who was then hidden in the subtitles of the evening program behind the names of Zdenka Podhrázská and Marie Kubátová (who had already invented the character of Trautenberk). The book Krkonošská pohádka, written according to the script for the evening show, was published in 1992 (the chapters are presented here partly in a different order than the TV episodes), the following year saw the (no longer filmed) continuation of Anča and Kuba maj Kubíček.

In 1998, the recording Jak se dal Trautenberk na cháry mary (again to the motifs of Marie Kubátová) was released on audio media. Anče and Kuba are cast in the same way as in the series, they also play: Radoslav Brzobohatý - Krakonoš, Josef Větrovec - Trautenberk, Lubomír Lipský - hunter, Jan Přeučil - chramostejl, Štěpánka Haničincová - narrator.

In 1999, the parody How Trautenberk Robbed Krakonošov révíre was presented as part of Česká Soda.

Marie Kubátová later disagreed with the tone of the filmed fairy tales and said in 2010: "You also invented Trautenberk. Yes, but when I saw the evening episode, I didn't recognize my fairy tales. It sounded like Krakonoš beating up a kulak, very black and white and it wasn't already my manuscript. Then the screenwriter published it as a book, but I told myself that I would not argue with my old knees, so I gave up the character of Trautenberk."
