= Darija Pavlovičová =

Czech actress (born 2001)

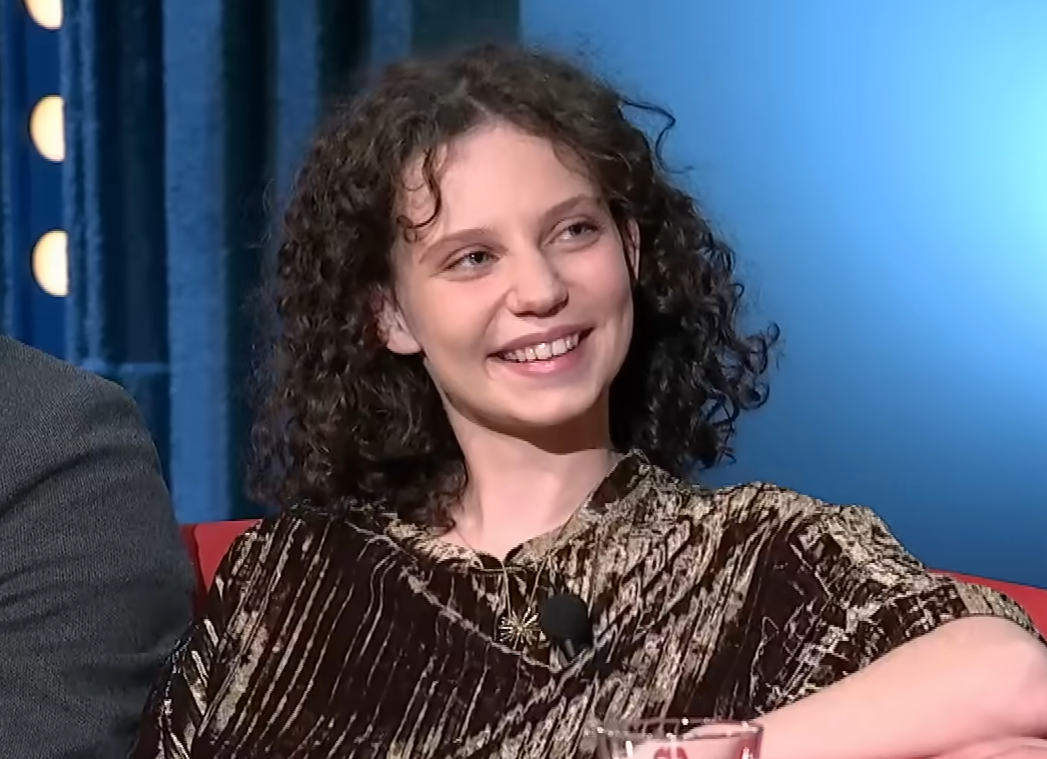
- Pavlovičová in 2023
- Born: 19 November 2001 (age 24); Prague, Czech Republic
- Occupations: Actress, model
- Years active: c. 2013–present
- Height: 171 cm (5 ft 7 in)

Darija Pavlovičová (born 19 November 2001) is a Czech actress and model. She starred in the 2021 Czech television series Kukačky and Zločiny Velké Prahy.

She was born in Prague to parents of Belarusian, Russian and Lithuanian origin. She studied acting at the Prague Conservatory. In December 2023, she won the 12th season of Czech dancing reality TV show StarDance with her professional partner Dominik Vodička.

In 2024, the Czech edition of Forbes featured Pavlovičová in their 30 under 30 list: 30 of the most talented Czechs under 30 years old.

== Selected filmography ==
=== Films ===
- O léčivé vodě (TV film) (2020)
- Vánoční příběh (2022)
- Perinbaba a dva světy (2023)
- O malých věcech (2023)

=== TV series ===
- Kukačky (2021)
- Zločiny Velké Prahy (2021)
- Dobré zprávy (2022)
- 1. MISE (2022)
- Dobré zprávy (2023)
- To se vysvětlí, soudruzi! (2024)
