= Jak dostat tatínka do polepšovny =

1978 Czechoslovak comedy film

- Directed by: Marie Polednáková
- Written by: Marie Polednáková
- Starring: Tomáš Holý; Jana Preissová; František Němec
- Cinematography: Petr Polák
- Edited by: Karel Kohout
- Music by: Václav Zahradník
- Release date: 24 December 1978
- Running time: 85 minutes
- Country: Czechoslovakia
- Language: Czech

Jak dostat tatínka do polepšovny (How to get dad into reform school) is a 1978 Czechoslovak family comedy film directed by Marie Poledňáková. The main characters are played by Jana Preissová, Tomáš Holý, and František Němec. It is a loose sequel to the film Jak vytrhnout velrybě stoličku.

== Plot ==
Twenty-eight-year-old ballerina Anna is a single mother raising her eight-year-old son Vašek. On a trip to the mountains, she runs into Luboš, a climber with whom she had a brief affair nine years before. She reveals to him that Vašek is his son. They decide to spend the upcoming summer holidays together, as Luboš wants to get to know his son and Anna is interested to get closer to Luboš. All planning for the summer vacation is left to Luboš under one condition—that they not go to the mountains. Anna doesn't want Vašek to follow in his father's footsteps and climb mountains as she is worried about his safety.

The first few days of their holiday go well. They travel from Prague by bicycle and sleep in tents, eventually reaching their destination, Luboš's childhood cottage. Here they are welcomed by Luboš's father. Vašek is happy to have a grandpa, but Anna's becomes worried as she realizes that the cottage is in the mountains. She forbids Luboš and Vašek to climb any rocks.

Luboš enjoys spending time with his estranged son but he also has romantic feelings for Anna, and he wishes to spend time with her alone. This is made difficult by the fact that Vašek and grandpa are always around. On top of this, grandpa begins to insist that Luboš and Anna get married as soon as possible.

Meanwhile, Luboš has broken his promise to Anna and has been taking Vašek climbing every day. When Anna finds out, Luboš convinces her that he was the one climbing and that Vašek only watched. Anna believes him at first, and the boys continue to climb daily. Luboš unexpectedly receives an invitation to an international climbing meet, which means he will not be able to stay with Anna and Vašek for the entire summer, as he had originally planned.

Anna agrees to marry Luboš, and the wedding is set to take place before his departure. Anna, however, is still not aware of his plans. While in town, some of the townspeople inform her about the climbing meet. As she is heading back to the cottage, Anna takes a shortcut which leads through the rocks Luboš and Vašek are climbing, catching them in the act. She is terrified for her son and angry at Luboš for his deception. She decides to take her son and return home immediately, cancelling the wedding.

At the end of summer, Luboš returns from the climbing meet, only to find out that Anna is expecting a second child with him. Vašek helps persuade his mother to forgive his dad, and the two parents eventually reconcile.

== Cast and characters ==
- Tomáš Holý as Vašek
- Jana Preissová as mother
- František Němec as father
- Josef Karlík as grandfather
- Petr Nárožný as mail carrier Fanda
- Luděk Sobota as Vlk, Máňa's crew
- Bronislav Poloczek as Lovec, Máňa's crew
- František Peterka as Kos, Máňa's crew
- Jana Dítětová as grandmother
- Gabriela Vránová as teacher
- Alena Kreuzmannová as make-up artist Boženka
- Vlastimil Harapes as ballet teacher

== Trivia ==
On the film's opening night of Christmas Eve 1978, about 89% of households with a television set in Czechoslovakia watched the film. This made it one of the most watched programs in the history of television broadcasting in the nation.
