= Ladislav Frej =

Czech actor

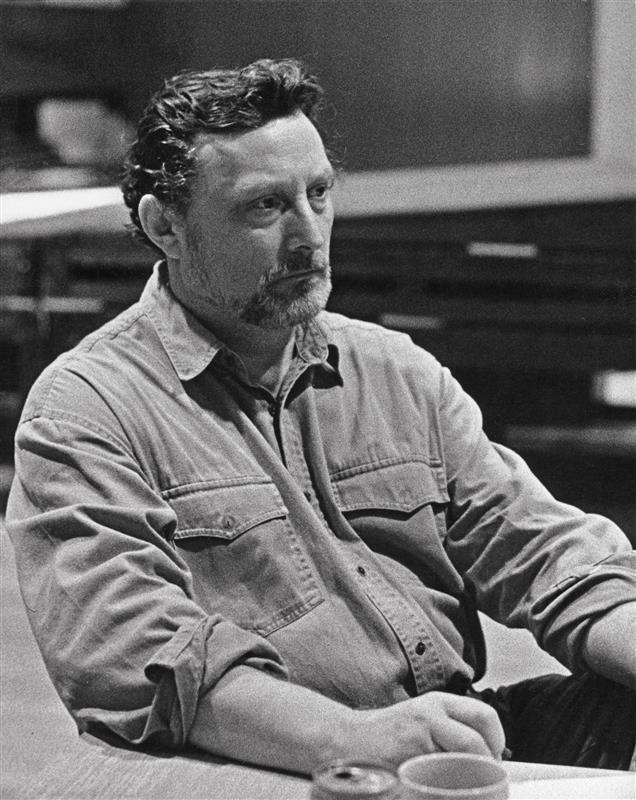
- Ladislav Frej
- Born: 26 November 1941 (age 83); Brno, Protectorate of Bohemia and Moravia
- Occupation: Actor
- Years active: 1963–present
- Spouse: Věra Galatíková
- Children: Kristýna Frejová; Ladislav Frej jr.

Signature
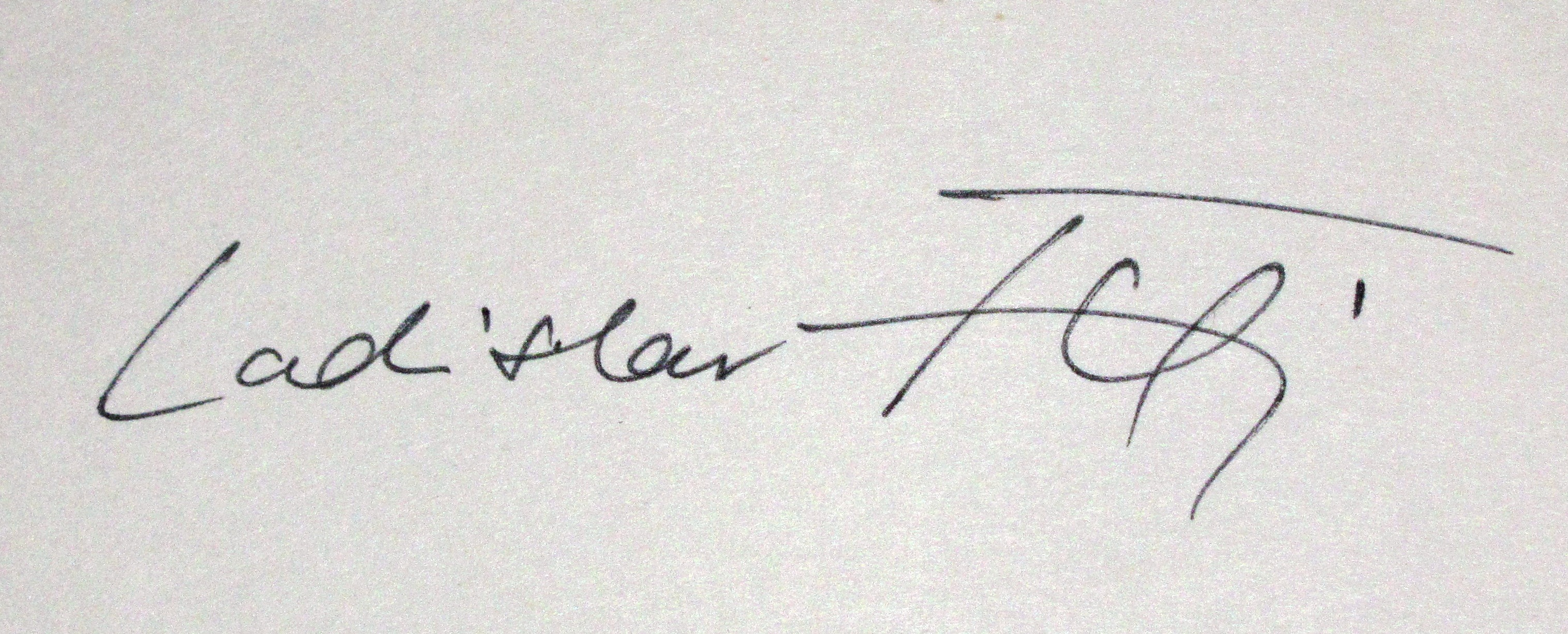

Ladislav Frej (born 26 November 1941) is a Czech actor and voice actor.

== Selected filmography ==
=== Film ===
- Signum Laudis (1980)
- Ta chvíle, ten okamžik (1981)
- Jára Cimrman Lying, Sleeping (1983)
- The Red Baron (2008)

=== Television ===
- Žena za pultem (1977)
- Hospital at the End of the City (1978)
- Malý pitaval z velkého města (1983)
- Dobrodružství kriminalistiky (1989)
- Kriminálka Anděl (2008)
- Stopy života (2013)
