= Petr Svojtka =

- Born: Petr Svojtka; 25 September 1946; Prague, Czechoslovakia
- Died: 9 May 1982 (aged 35); Prague, Czechoslovakia
- Years active: 1964-1981
- Spouse(s): Kateřina Macháčková; Jana Boušková

Petr Svojtka (25 September 1946 – 9 May 1982) was a Czechoslovak actor who was active in Czech television and film during the 1970s and early 1980s. In 1968 he graduated from the Department of Dramatic Theatre at the Academy of Performing Arts, Prague. From 1968 through 1975 he was a resident actor at the Jiřího Wolkera Theatre. He left there to join the roster of resident actors at the National Theatre, Prague in 1975. He remained there until his death in a tram accident in 1982. His first wife was the actress Kateřina Macháčková; followed by his second marriage to the actress Jana Boušková.

== Work ==
=== Theater ===
- Romeo (W. Shakespeare, Romeo i Julia, 1971)
- Benjamin (V. Nezval, Milenci z kiosku, 1975)
- Edmund (W. Shakespeare, Král Lear, 1980)
- Lucius (J. Drda, Hrátky s čertem, 1982).

=== Television ===
- Youngest of the Hamr's Family (1975)
- Žena za pultem (1977)
- Inženýrská odysea (1979)
- Arabela (1980)
- Okres na severu (1981).

=== Film ===
- Nevěsta (1970)
- Lovers in the Year One (1973)
- The Little Mermaid (1976)
- Hodinářova svatební cesta korálovým mořem (1979)
- Ta chvíle, ten okamžik (1981).
