= Tomorrow I'll Wake Up and Scald Myself with Tea =

1977 Czechoslovak science fiction comedy film

- Directed by: Jindřich Polák
- Written by: Josef Nesvadba
- Screenplay by: Jindřich Polák, Miloš Macourek
- Produced by: Jan Šuster
- Starring: Petr Kostka
- Cinematography: Jan Kališ
- Edited by: Zdeněk Stehlík
- Music by: Karel Svoboda
- Production company: Barrandov Studios
- Release date: 1 August 1977
- Running time: 90 minutes
- Country: Czechoslovakia
- Language: Czech

Tomorrow I'll Wake Up and Scald Myself with Tea (Czech: Zítra vstanu a opařím se čajem) is a 1977 Czechoslovak science fiction comedy film directed by Jindřich Polák. It is a screen adaptation of Josef Nesvadba's short story with the title Výprava opačným směrem (Expedition in the opposite direction).

== Plot ==
In the near future, a technology enabling time travel has been developed and is now in commercial use. A group of unaging (thanks to anti-aging pills, which have also been developed) Nazis conspires to alter the results of the Second World War by traveling back in time and supplying Adolf Hitler with a hydrogen bomb. To this end, they bribe the corrupt time machine pilot Karel, who agrees to assist them. On the day of the scheduled journey, Karel chokes on a breadroll and dies. His identical twin brother, Jan, cannot bring himself to tell Karel's fiancée Eva and begins to impersonate Karel. He is also later mistaken for Karel by the Nazis and stumbles along with their plot. Having been a designer of the rocket-ship time machine, he is able to pilot the ship and take them all back in time. When he realizes the nature of the Nazis' plans, Jan resolves to prevent their success. After triggering several paradoxes by travelling back and forth in time, he manages to defeat the Nazis and resolve the consequences of his twin's death.

== Cast ==
- Petr Kostka as Karel/Jan Bureš
- Jiří Sovák as Klaus Abard
- Vladimír Menšík as Kraus
- Vlastimil Brodský as engineer Bauer
- Valerie Chmelová as Helena Máchová
- Otto Šimánek as Mr. Patrick White
- Marie Rosůlková as Mrs. Shirley White
- Slávka Budínová as Mrs. Kroupová
- Josef Větrovec as Mr. Kroupa
- František Vicena as Adolf Hitler
- Horst Giese as Joseph Goebbels
- Ota Sklenčka as Doctor Kryl
- Jiří Lábus as the technician
- Petr Nárožný as the driver
- Svatopluk Beneš as old Nazi
- Zuzana Ondrouchová as Eva Kroupová
