= Ženy v pokušení =

2010 Czech comedy film

- Directed by: Jiří Vejdělek
- Written by: Jiří Vejdělek
- Produced by: Tomáš Hoffman; Jiří Vejdělek
- Starring: Lenka Vlasáková; Eliška Balzerová; Vojtěch Dyk
- Cinematography: Martin Šácha
- Edited by: Ondřej Hokr
- Music by: Jan P. Muchow
- Distributed by: FALCON a.s.
- Release date: 18 March 2010 (Czech Republic)
- Running time: 118 minutes
- Country: Czech Republic
- Language: Czech
- Budget: 25 Million CZK
- Box office: 124,061,075 CZK

Ženy v pokušení (lit. 'Women in Temptation') is a 2010 Czech comedy film directed by Jiří Vejdělek.

== Plot summary ==
Helena (Lenka Dolanská Vlasáková), a relations consultant in her 40's, finds out one day, she faces problems she used to tackle with her clients. Her loving husband is caught in flagranti with a strange woman and Helena is facing new reality. Her 20-year-old daughter Laura (Veronika Khek Kubařová) and her own mother Wilma (Eliška Balzerová) are trying to support her mother and slowly finding out, how similar situation they had to handle and how difficult is to struggle relations with grace and humor.

== Cast ==
- Lenka Dolanská Vlasáková as Helena
- Eliška Balzerová as Vilma
- Vojtěch Dyk as Jakub
- Veronika Khek Kubařová as Laura
- Jiří Macháček as Michal
- Roman Zach as Dan
- Martin Pechlát as Fabián
