= Tam, kde hnízdí čápi =

1975 film

- Directed by: Karel Steklý
- Written by: Karel Steklý
- Starring: Jiří Krampol
- Release date: 1975
- Running time: 126 minutes
- Country: Czechoslovakia
- Language: Czech

Tam, kde hnízdí čápi is a 1975 Czechoslovak drama film directed by Karel Steklý.

== Cast ==
- Jiří Krampol
- Milena Svobodová
- Adolf Filip
- Zdeněk Kryzánek
- Gustav Opočenský
- Jan Skopeček
- Miloš Willig
- Josef Vinklář
- Antonín Hardt
- Jiří Holý
- Vlasta Fialová
