= List of Kriminálka Anděl episodes =

This following is an episode list for the Czech crime drama television series Kriminálka Anděl, which premiered on TV Nova on 1 September 2008.

== Episodes ==
=== Season 1 (2008) ===
No.	Title	Directed by	Written by	Original release date
1	"Záchvěv lidskosti"	Robert Šveda	Unknown	1 September 2008
2	"Bezdomovci"	P. Bebjak	Unknown	8 September 2008
3	"Chladnokrevně"	Robert Šveda	Unknown	15 September 2008
4	"Mrtvý v hotelu"	Robert Šveda	Unknown	22 September 2008
5	"Smrtelný žert"	P. Bebjak	Unknown	29 September 2008
6	"Úmyslné nehody"	Robert Šveda	Unknown	3 May 2010
7	"Čarodějnice"	Robert Šveda	Unknown	13 October 2008
8	"Staré vraždy"	Robert Šveda	Unknown	20 October 2008
9	"Baba na zabití"	Gejza Dezorz	Unknown	17 October 2008
10	"Loupež"	Gejza Dezorz	Unknown	3 November 2008
11	"Manželský kosočtverec"	P. Bebjak	Unknown	10 November 2008
12	"Posedlost"	P. Bebjak	Unknown	24 November 2008
13	"Korunní princ"	Robert Šveda	Petr Hudský	26 April 2010

=== Season 2 (2010) ===
No.	Title	Directed by	Written by	Original release date
14	"Minuta ticha"	Jiří Chlumský	Unknown	8 March 2010
15	"Lidská skládačka"	Dan Wlodarzyk	Unknown	15 March 2010
16	"Legionář"	Ivan Pokorný	Unknown	22 March 2010
17	"Miluj bližního svého"	Ivan Pokorný	Unknown	29 March 2010
18	"Nenávist"	Jiří Chlumský	Unknown	12 April 2010
19	"Otázka víry"	Dan Wlodarzyk	Unknown	19 April 2010

=== Season 3 (2011) ===
Third season was shot since April 2010.

No.	Title	Directed by	Written by	Original release date
1	"Švýcarský řez"	Unknown	Unknown	21 March 2011
2	TBA	Unknown	Unknown	28 March 2011
3	TBA	Unknown	Unknown	4 April 2011
