= Okres na severu =

Czechoslovak television series

- Created by: Evžen Sokolovský; Jaroslav Dietl
- Starring: Jaroslav Moučka; Jiřina Švorcová; Petr Svojtka; Josef Bláha; Renáta Doleželová; Jiří Štěpnička
- Country of origin: Czechoslovakia
- Original language: Czech
- No. of seasons: 1
- No. of episodes: 13

Production
- Running time: 60

Original release
- Network: Czechoslovak Television
- Release: 1981

Okres na severu is a Czechoslovak TV series filmed by Evžen Sokolovský in 1981.

== Synopsis ==
The main character is Josef Pláteník, a conscientious and responsible man, and the leader of the Communist party in Brod, a fast-growing industrial region. All of his days are full of problems that must be solved.
