= Jiří Krampol =

Czech actor (1938–2025)

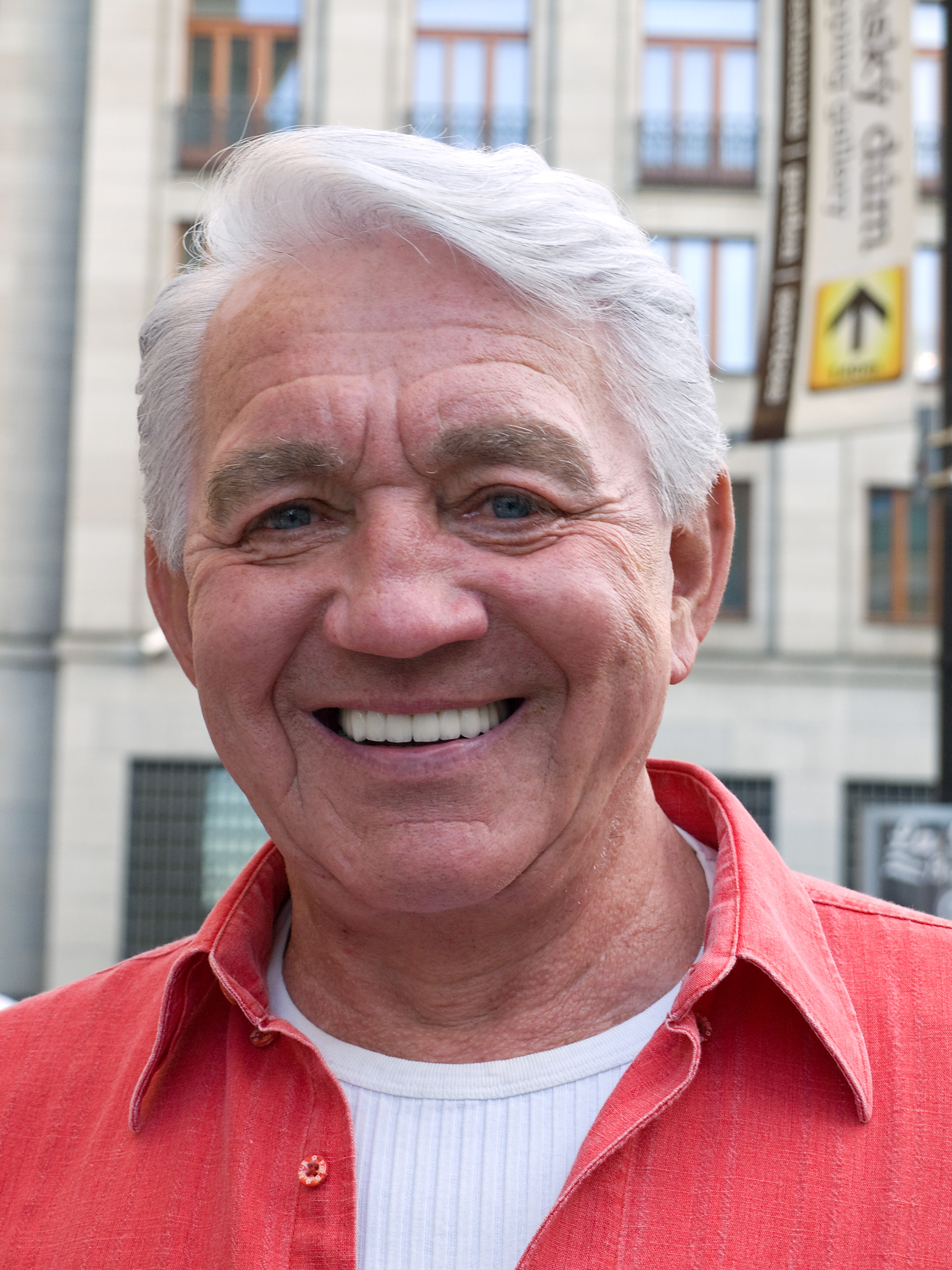
- Krampol in 2011
- Born: 11 July 1938; Buštěhrad, Czechoslovakia
- Died: 26 July 2025 (aged 87); Prague, Czech Republic
- Occupations: Actor; comedian; television presenter
- Years active: 1958–2015

Jiří Krampol (11 July 1938 – 26 July 2025) was a Czech actor, comedian and television presenter. He was best known as a Czech voice actor of Jean-Paul Belmondo and Louis de Funès, and was the recipient of the František Filipovský Award for lifetime contribution to Czech voice acting.

== Life and career ==
Jiří Krampol was born on 11 July 1938 in Buštěhrad, when his parents were there visiting friends. However, his family lived in the Vinohrady district of Prague at the time. His father worked in a managerial position at Baťa Company. After his father fell ill, the family moved to a small apartment in Prague-Žižkov in c. 1942. His childhood in what was then a poor neighbourhood was an inspiration for his later creative work. He lived with his mother in Žižkov until he was thirty.

Krampol began studying acting because of his platonic love for actress Milena Dvorská. He graduated at the Theatre Faculty of the Academy of Performing Arts in Prague in 1962. He briefly worked at the Divadlo na Fidlovačce theatre. From 1962 to 1971, he was employed in the Theatre on the Balustrade. From 1972 to 1979, he played in the Ateliér Theatre, but then he returned to the Theatre on the Balustrade. In 1983–1990, he played at the Semafor theatre, where he formed an author's duo with comedian Miloslav Šimek. Together they founded Jiří Grossmann Theatre (today known as Palace Theatre). In the mid-1990s they broke up and Krampol became a solo entertainer.

In c. 1968, Krampol married the radio presenter Jana Fořtová, but the marriage failed. He lived with his second wife Hana in Okoř, and after her death in August 2020 he moved back to Prague. Krampol was physically fit and athletic, actively engaged in weightlifting until the age of 70. This was reflected in the type of film roles he got.

In addition to his acting and comedy activities, Krampol was known as a voice actor. He dubbed Jean-Paul Belmondo in Czech in thirty films and earned the nickname "Czech Belmondo". He also regularly dubbed Louis de Funès, after his previous voice actor František Filipovský died. Krampol worked as a TV presenter and was also engaged in amateur painting and writing autobiographical books.

Krampol died on 26 July 2025, at the age of 87.

=== Film career ===
Krampol's film career included dozens of roles, mostly minor. He debuted in the film Tři přání in 1958. He considered his most memorable role to be in the TV series Synové a dcery Jakuba skláře. His filmography includes:

- Čert a Káča (TV film; 1970)
- Sokolovo (1974)
- Thirty Cases of Major Zeman (TV series; 1975)
- Tam, kde hnízdí čápi (1975)
- Operation Daybreak (1975)
- Parta hic (1976)
- Návštěvníci (TV series; 1983)
- Malý pitaval z velkého města (TV series; 1983–1986)
- Synové a dcery Jakuba skláře (TV series; 1986)
- Forbidden Dreams (1986)
- Chlapci a chlapi (TV series; 1988)
- Andělská tvář (2002)

== Honours ==
Krampol was the recipient of the František Filipovský Award for lifetime contribution to Czech voice acting. In 2018, he was awarded by the Czech Republic's Medal of Merit (First Class) for services to the state in the field of culture.
