= Satinský =

Satinský may refer to:

- 15946 Satinský, a main belt asteroid
- Július Satinský, a Slovak actor, comedian, showman and writer
- Satinsky clamp
