= Eliška Balzerová =

Czech actress (born 1949)

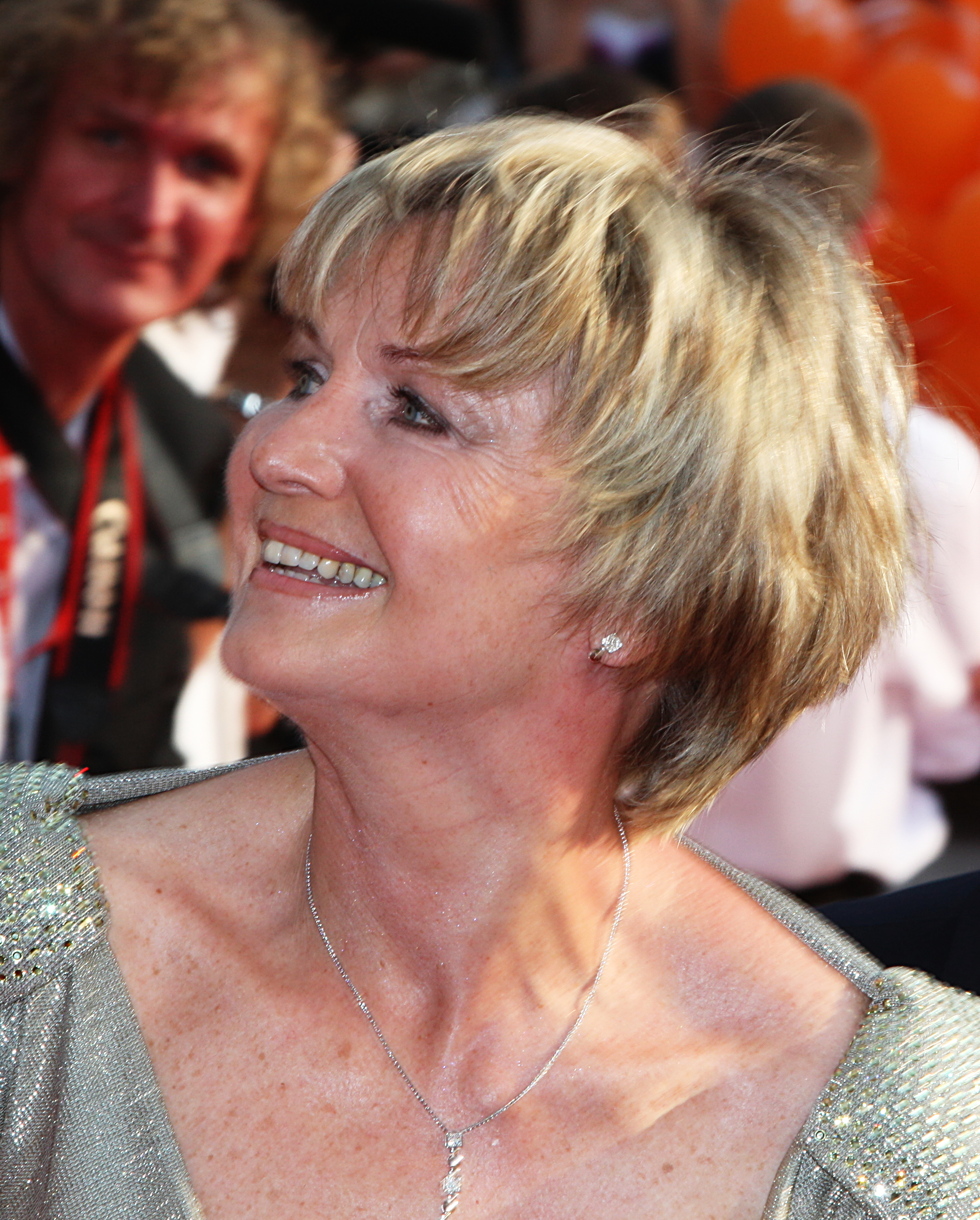
- Eliška Balzerová (2010)
- Born: 25 May 1949 (age 77); Vsetín, Czechoslovakia
- Occupation: Actress
- Years active: 1971-present

Eliška Balzerová (born 25 May 1949, Vsetín) is a Czech actress. She has appeared in more than thirty films since 1971. She became widely known for the role of physician Alžběta Čeňková in the television series Hospital at the End of the City and Hospital at the End of the City After Twenty Years. She also appeared in films such as Fists in the Dark and Run, Waiter, Run!. In 2010, she received the Czech Lion Award for Best Supporting Actress.

== Biography ==
She spent her childhood in Moravské Budějovice. Her mother introduced her to theatre and was active in an amateur drama group. She has one sister.

She studied at the Brno Conservatory from 1963 to 1967, where she earned a DiS degree. She later studied dramatic acting at the Janáček Academy of Music and Performing Arts in Brno from 1967 to 1971. The MgA degree was formally granted to her retrospectively under a 1998 law.

== Selected filmography ==
Film
Year	Title	Role	Notes
2019	The Last Aristocrat	Mrs. Tichá	
2018	Tátova Volha	Eva	
2016	Tiger Theory	Olga	
2011	The Magical Duvet	Grandma	
2010	Ženy v pokušení	Vilma Válová	
1986	Fists in the Dark	Ema Gabrielová	
1982	I Enjoy the World with You	Dáša Adámková	
1981	Waiter, Scarper!	Věra	

TV
Year	Title	Role	Notes
1993	Městem chodí Mikuláš	"Stará koza"	
1979	Zlatí úhoři	Mrs. Rozvědčíková	
1979	Zkoušky z dospělosti	Professor Jánská	
1979	Inženýrská odysea	Alexandra Pešková	10 episodes
1977-1981	Hospital at the End of the City	MUDr. Alžběta „Betty“ Čeňková	

== Awards ==
- Czech Lion for Best Supporting Actress (2010)
