= Czech Century =

2013 Czech television series

- Genre: Historical, Drama
- Written by: Pavel Kosatík, Robert Sedláček
- Directed by: Robert Sedláček
- Starring: Martin Huba; Martin Finger; Daniel Landa; Ivan Trojan; Jan Novotný; Jiří Vyorálek; David Novotný; Ján Gallovič; Jan Hájek; Marek Daniel; Jaroslav Plesl
- Country of origin: Czech Republic
- Original language: Czech
- No. of seasons: 1
- No. of episodes: 9

Production
- Running time: 65–83 minutes

Original release
- Network: Czech Television
- Release: 2013 – 2014

Czech Century (Czech: České století) is a Czech historical television series. It deals with the background of important historical events in Czech history since World War I to the Dissolution of Czechoslovakia. According to the creators, it is not a pure documentary series, but rather a film series "exposing the taboo of key events of our modern history". In particular, the series studies the psychology and mental motivations of individual actors of historical events in the moments when these personalities "had a knife to their throats" and were aware that their decision would affect not only their loved ones, but the entire nation for many years to come. The authors deliberately do not evaluate whether the persons in question behaved right or wrong from a historical point of view.

"Legendary characters are just people who sweat, speculate, live paradoxes, go to the toilet and talk about banalities, themselves confused about where history has taken them, and follow the only possible principle, which is the 'moral law within me', however they end up acting badly and selfishly." — series creators.

== Cast ==
- Martin Huba as Tomáš Masaryk
- Daniela Kolářová as Charlotte Garrigue
- Jiří Bábek as Jan Masaryk
- Ivana Uhlířová as Olga Masaryková
- Martin Finger and Jan Novotný as Edvard Beneš
- Monika Fingerová as Hana Benešová
- Jaromír Janeček as Jan Herben
- Jan Grygar as Přemysl Šámal
- Mário Kubec as Karel Kramář
- Igor Bareš as František Thun
- Pavel Rímský as Robert Cecil
- Miroslav Donutil as David Lloyd George
- Ivo Novák as Henry Wickham Steed
- Jaromír Nosek as Robert William Seton-Watson
- Radim Novák as Jaromír Smutný
- Daniel Landa as Emanuel Moravec
- Karel Dobrý as Lev Prchala
- Luboš Veselý as Vojtěch Luža
- Miloslav Mejzlík as Ludvík Krejčí
- Pavel Batěk as Karel Paleček
- David Suchařípa as Silvestr Bláha
- Miro Grisa as Karel Husárek
- Martin Stránský as Sergej Vojcechovský
- Robert Jašków as Jan Syrový
- Ivan Trojan as František Moravec
- Aleš Procházka as Sergěj Ingr
- Michal Dlouhý as Emil Strankmüller
- Andreas Kaulfuss as Eugen de Witte
- Hartmut Krug as Wenzel Jaksch
- Richard Syms as Winston Churchill
- Marian Roden as Hubert Ripka
- Jiří Vyorálek as Klement Gottwald
- Rita Jasinská as Marta Gottwaldová
- Radek Holub as Alexej Čepička
- Jaromír Dulava as Antonín Zápotocký
- David Novotný as Rudolf Slánský
- Jan Budař as Václav Kopecký
- Jiří Štrébl as Václav Nosek
- Jiří Havel as Jan Šrámek
- Jiří Čapka as Adolf Procházka
- Miroslav Babuský as Jan Jína
- Vilém Udatný as Ivo Ducháček
- Martin Veliký as Július Ďuriš
- Václav Knop as Jaroslav Stránský
- Matěj Dadák as Prokop Drtina
- Hanuš Bor as Petr Zenkl
- Peter Varga as Julius Firt
- Karel Zima as Bohumil Laušman
- Matúš Bukovčan as Štefan Kočvara
- Tomáš Kraucher as Vladimír Krajina
- Jan Holík as František Hála
- Petra Jungmanová as Milada Horáková
- Vladimír Koval as Valerian Alexandrovič Zorin
- Zdeněk Bureš as Antonín Novotný
- Andrej Bestchastny as Anastas Mikoyan
- Emil Horváth as Ludvík Svoboda
- Ján Gallovič and Alois Švehlík as Alexander Dubček
- Peter Marcin as Vasil Biľak
- Oleksandr Ihnatusha as Leonid Brezhnev
- Alexander Podolkhov as Alexei Kosygin
- Ján Greššo as Gustáv Husák
- Jiří Zapletal ml. as Josef Smrkovský
- Jan Vondráček as Oldřich Černík
- Zdeněk Černín as František Kriegel
- Petr Halberstadt as Zdeněk Mlynář
- Marek Daniel as Václav Havel
- Tereza Hofová as Olga Havlová
- David Matásek as Pavel Kohout
- Jan Hájek as Ivan Martin Jirous
- František Němec as Jan Patočka
- Petr Vacek as František Šmejkal
- Martin Myšička as Jiří Němec
- Miroslav Táborský as Jiří Hájek
- Michal Pavlata as Václav Černý
- Petr Batěk as Petr Uhl
- Jiří Lábus as Ladislav Adamec
- Roman Luknár as Marián Čalfa
- Oldřich Kaiser as Oskar Krejčí
- Václav Jiráček as Václav Malý
- Jan Krafta as Vladimír Hanzel
- Jan Sklenář as Alexandr Vondra
- Miroslav Hanuš as Petr Pithart
- Daniel Rous as Jiří Křižan
- Matej Landl as Ján Čarnogurský
- Martin Janouš as Jan Stráský
- Martin Dejdar as Miroslav Macek
- Jaroslav Plesl as Václav Klaus
- Marek Ťapák as Vladimír Mečiar
- Bohumil Klepl as Tomáš Ježek
- Petr Pelzer as Pavel Tigrid

== Episodes ==
No.	Title	Directed by	Written by	Original release date	Czech viewers (millions)
1	"Veliké bourání (1918)"	Robert Sedláček	Pavel Kosatík	October 27, 2013	0.630
2	"Den po Mnichovu (1938)"	Robert Sedláček	Pavel Kosatík, Robert Sedláček	November 3, 2013	0.752
3	"Kulka pro Heydricha (1941)"	Robert Sedláček	Pavel Kosatík	November 10, 2013	0.686
4	"Všechnu moc lidu Stalinovi (1948)"	Robert Sedláček	Pavel Kosatík, Robert Sedláček	November 17, 2013	0.534
5	"Zabíjení soudruha (1951)"	Robert Sedláček	Pavel Kosatík	November 24, 2013	0.663
6	"Musíme se dohodnout (1968)"	Robert Sedláček	Pavel Kosatík	November 16, 2014	0.350
7	"Je to jen rokenrol (1976)"	Robert Sedláček	Pavel Kosatík	November 23, 2014	0.389
8	"Poslední hurá (1989)"	Robert Sedláček	Pavel Kosatík	November 30, 2014	0.404
9	"Ať si jdou (1992)"	Robert Sedláček	Pavel Kosatík	December 7, 2014	0.366
