= Malý pitaval z velkého města =

1983 Czechoslovak crime television series

- Starring: Ladislav Frej; Vlastimil Hašek; Jiří Krampol; Pavel Zedníček; Michal Pešek
- Country of origin: Czechoslovakia
- Original language: Czech
- No. of seasons: 2
- No. of episodes: 15

Production
- Running time: 49–63 min

Original release
- Network: Czechoslovak Television
- Release: 1983 – 1986

Malý pitaval z velkého města (English: "minor tales of crime from a major city") is a Czechoslovak crime television series.

== Synopsis ==
The series focuses on work of criminologists of the Criminal Police Department of the National Security Corps in the investigation of crimes - theft, extortion and murder, some of which are inspired by real events. The expert advisor of the series was Maj. Miloslav Šimek and Maj. Jaroslav Buchar.

== Cast and characters ==
- Ladislav Frej as Břetislav Kubát
- Vlastimil Hašek as Rudolf Pekař
- Jiří Krampol as Libor Krejcárek
- Pavel Zedníček as Kamil Hamřík
- Michal Pešek as Jiří Otradovec
- Svatopluk Skopal as Jaroslav Jarolím
- Jan Faltýnek as Wintr
- Jaroslava Brousková as Zuzana
- Josef Abrhám as Divíšek
- Jan Vlasák as operational officer
