= Ta chvíle, ten okamžik =

1981 film by Jiří Sequens

- Directed by: Jiří Sequens
- Written by: Otakar Chaloupka; Václav Sasek; Jiří Sequens
- Starring: František Němec
- Cinematography: Jirí Sámal
- Release date: July 1981
- Running time: 100 minutes
- Country: Czechoslovakia
- Language: Czech

Ta chvíle, ten okamžik (English title: That Instant, That While) is a 1981 Czech drama film directed by Jiří Sequens. It was entered into the 12th Moscow International Film Festival where it won a Special Prize.

== Cast ==
- František Němec as MUDr. Kodet
- Daniela Kolářová as Helena
- Luděk Munzar as Baumann
- Ladislav Frej as Brázda
- Rudolf Jelínek as Frantisek
- Yevgeni Zharikov as Boris
- Vilém Besser as MUDr. Herman (as Míla Besser)
- Petr Svojtka as MUDr. Valsa
- Libuše Geprtová as Bela
- Jiří Strnad as Karlík
- Miluše Šplechtová as Nurse Vlasta
