= Dobrá čtvrť =

Czech drama television series

- Starring: Martha Issová
- Country of origin: Czech Republic

Original release
- Release: 2005 – 2008

Dobrá čtvrť (The Good District) is a Czech drama TV series, which ran from 2005 to 2008.

== Plot ==
18-year-old Zuzana must deal with leaving her friends behind, as her family moves from a palatial villa to a confining apartment. However, she will not miss Michal, the neighborhood bully. She prepares for her senior year at school and graduating at its end, when she learns she has a new classmate—Michal.

== Cast ==
- Martha Issová .... Katka Erhartová
- Anna Kulovaná .... Zuzana Haselbachová
- Pavel Trojan .... Honza Opelík
- Přemysl Boublík .... Michal Koreň
- Tomáš Hanák .... Ondřej Erhart
- Milan Bahúl .... Peter Koreň
- Vilma Cibulková .... Simona Koreňová
- Jana Preissová .... Jarmila Svobodová
- Zdeněk Žák .... Vojtěch Haselbach
- Jiří Bartoška .... Martin Palouš (2nd Season, 2008)
- Jan Dolanský .... Bondy (2nd Season, 2008)
- Veronika Gajerová .... Jiřina Haselbachová
- Barbora Srncová .... Janka Kopičková
- Alice Görnerová .... Alice Kopecká
- Jiří Pecha .... grandfather Opelík
- Milan Šteindler .... school janitor
- Liliya Malkina .... housekeeper
- Jiřina Jirásková .... Mrs. Svobodová's mother
- Tereza Nekudová .... Linda
- František Němec .... Vladimír, Jarmila's boyfriend
- David Švehlík .... teacher Prachař (2nd Season, 2008)
- Anna Pošmourná .... Bára Kopecká
- Predrag Bjelać .... Dragan (2nd Season 2008)
- Simona Babčáková .... barman
- Hana Maciuchová .... Jarmila's friend
- Karel Smyczek, director
- Lucie Konášová, writer
