= Inženýrská odysea =

Czech television series

- Created by: Evžen Sokolovský, Jaroslav Dietl
- Starring: Jaroslav Satoranský; Petr Kostka; Michal Dočolomanský; Eva Jakoubková; Eliška Balzerová; Ilja Prachař
- Country of origin: Czechoslovakia
- Original languages: Czech, Slovak
- No. of episodes: 13

Production
- Running time: 60

Original release
- Network: Czechoslovak Television
- Release: 1979 – 2006

Inženýrská odysea ("engineer's odyssey") is a Czechoslovak/Czech TV series about three young students and their lives.

== Plot ==
The story begins in college, where three young students, Zbyněk, Vašek, and Jano, are roommates. They decide to work for the same company after their studies, but after military service, they each go to a different city.
