= Tomáš Raček =

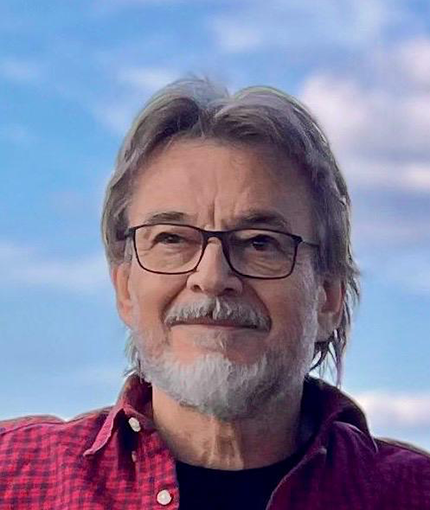
- Born: December 21, 1947 (age 77); Svätý Michal nad Žitavou, Slovakia
- Occupation: Actor
- Years active: 1972–present
- Spouse: Oľga Račeková (m. 1976)
- Children: Tom Raček, Oľga Mária Račeková, Matúš Raček, Tereza Račeková, Jozef Raček, Jakub Raček
- Parent(s): Jozef Raček, Mária Račeková
- Website: tomasjmracek.com

Tomáš Raček also known as Tomáš J.M. Raček (born 21 December 1947) is a Slovak theatre, film and television actor, living in Canada.

== Awards ==
In 2023, Tomáš won the Best Actor award at the Heart of Europe International (HEI) Film Festival in Košice, Slovakia, for his performance in the short film Milan.

== Filmography ==
- 2023 – Milan (Short film, Canada - Directed by Jakub Raček)
- 2019 – Convergence (Short film, Canada - Directed by Jakub Raček)
- 2006 – The Hit (Movie Trailer, Canada - Directed by John Grant)
- 1996 – Captive Heart: The James Mink Story (USA TV film - Directed by Bruce Pittman)
- 1989 – Jablonka (TV film)
- 1989 – Kamene (TV film)
- 1989 – Škola detektívky (TV seriál)
- 1988 – O láske a slávikoch (TV film)
- 1987 – Vizitka (TV film)
- 1987 – Hľadanie šťastnej chvíle (TV film)
- 1987 – Diplomati Októbra (TV film)
- 1987 – Matej Bel z Očovej (TV film)
- 1987 – Hrdina západu (TV film)
- 1986 – Akcia Edelstein (TV film)
- 1986 – Okná dokorán (TV seriál)
- 1986 – Čarbák (TV film)
- 1986 – Hra s ohňom (TV film)
- 1986 – Život Augusta Strindberga (koprodukcia Švédsko)
- 1985 – Sekera (TV film)
- 1985 – Skleníková Venuša
- 1984 – Návrat Jána Petru
- 1984 – O sláve a tráve
- 1984 – Súťaž o milión (TV film)
- 1984 – Lev Tolstoj (koprodukcia ZSSR)
- 1984 – V bludisku pamäti
- 1983 – Anička Jurkovičová (TV film)
- 1983 – Magma (TV film)
- 1983 – Maťo Šidlo Mátožidlo (TV seriál)
- 1983 – Šanca (TV film)
- 1983 – Husiarka a kráľ (TV film)
- 1983 – Ruže a sneh (TV film)
- 1982 – Podivné okolnosti (TV film)
- 1982 – Popolvár najväčší na svete
- 1982 – Cukor (TV film)
- 1981 – Čisté vody (TV film)
- 1981 – Štrnásť výstrelov (TV film)
- 1981 – Desiaty chlap (TV film)
- 1980 – Recept od starej mamy (TV film)
- 1980 – Svadba bez nevesty (TV seriál)
- 1980 – Zbožňovaná (TV film)
- 1980 – Klenovič Ján (TV film)
- 1980 – Podobizeň prvej lásky (TV film)
- 1979 – Choď a nelúč sa
- 1979 – Rosnička
- 1979 – Železné ruky (TV film)
- 1979 – Smrť šitá na mieru
- 1979 – Dobrí ľudia ešte žijú (TV film)
- 1979 – Prerušená hra
- 1979 – Smrť chodí po horách (TV film)
- 1979 – Blízke diaľavy
- 1979 – Cnostný Metod
- 1978 – Zbojnícky tanec (TV film)
- 1978 – Krutá ľúbosť
- 1978 – Kto ste, Jozef Gabčík?
- 1978 – Zem nezasľúbená (TV film)
- 1978 – Ežo Vlkolinský (TV film)
- 1978 – Úsmev diabla
- 1978 – Gábor Vlkolinský (TV film)
- 1978 – Izrafel (TV film)
- 1978 – Pustý dvor
- 1977 – Jedenáste prikázanie (TV seriál)
- 1977 – Louis Pasteur (TV film)
- 1977 – Ako sa Vinco zaťal (TV film)
- 1977 – Novinárske rozprávky (TV seriál)
- 1977 – Zlaté klasy (TV film)
- 1977 – Advokátka
- 1977 – Vzkriesenie (TV film)
- 1977 – Chlapi (TV film)
- 1977 – Bludička
- 1974 – Operácia Raketa (TV film)
- 1974 – Kronika (TV film)
- 1974 – Trofej neznámeho strelca
- 1973 – Horká zima
- 1973 – Havária (TV film)
- 1971 – Žiarlivé ženy (TV film)
- 1971 – V tieni vlkov (TV seriál)
