= Václav Jiráček =

Czech actor

- Born: 28 September 1978 (age 47); Prague, Czechoslovakia (now Czech Republic)
- Education: DAMU
- Occupations: Theatre and film actor
- Years active: 2002 - present
- Height: 175 cm (5 ft 9 in)

Václav Jiráček (born 28 September 1978 in Prague) is a Czech theatre and film actor. He has appeared in films, TV series and theatre productions.

== Life ==
After doing a degree in business, he decided to go into acting and was eventually admitted to the Theatre Faculty of the Academy of Performing Arts in Prague (DAMU), from where he graduated in 2009. He is currently based in Dejvice.

== Filmography ==
- 2016 Bohéma, directed by Jiří Weiss
- 2015 Přístav
- 2013 Sanitka 2
- 2013 České století
- 2011 Lidice
- 2010 Mamas & Papas
- 2010 Jseš mrtvej, tak nebreč
- 2010 Bludičky
- 2009 X=X+1 (krátkometrážní)
- 2009 Janosik: A True Story
- 2009 Hodinu nevíš
- 2008 Guard No. 47
- 2008 Dark Spirits
- 2007 Na vlastní nebezpečí
- 2006 Pokus
- 2006 Krev zmizelého
- 2006 Besame mucho
- 2005 Restart
- 2004 Non plus ultras
- 2004 Krev zmizelého
- 2003 Bespojení
- 2002 Trickster
