= Zuzana Ondrouchová =

- Born: 20 March 1950; Prague, Czechoslovakia
- Died: 3 February 1978 (aged 27); Prague, Czechoslovakia
- Occupation: Actress
- Years active: 1956–1978
- Spouse: Petr Svárovský

Zuzana Ondrouchová (20 March 1950 – 3 February 1978) was a Czechoslovak actress born in Prague into the family of a medical doctor. The actor Petr Svárovský was her husband.

== Career ==
After the graduation on DAMU she moved to Karlovy Vary where she played in Vítězslav Nezval Theater. She worked for Czechoslovak Television and for Film Studios Barrandov. Her last role was Eva Kroupová in the movie Tomorrow I'll Wake Up and Scald Myself with Tea.

== Death ==
She died month before her 28th birthday of leukemia in Prague.

== Filmography ==
- Honzíkova cesta (1956)
- Prázdniny v oblacích (1959)
- Život pro Jana Kašpara (1959)
- Zpívající pudřenka (1959)
- Probuzení (1959)
- Osení (1960)
- Malý Bobeš (1961)
- Pohled do očí (1961)
- Táto, sežeň štěně! (1964)
- If a Thousand Clarinets (1965)
- Vrah skrývá tvář (1966)
- Poklad byzantského kupce (1966)
- Dívka s třemi velbloudy (1967)
- Kateřina a její děti (1970)
- Pan Tau (1970)
- Za ranních červánků (1970)
- Žebrácká opera (1971)
- Pan Tau a taxikář (1972)
- Byl jednou jeden dům (1974)
- Osvobození Prahy (1975)
- Profesoři za školou (1975)
- Boty plné vody (1976)
- Blaťácká povídačka (1977)
- Zítra vstanu a opařím se čajem (1977)
- Ve znamení Merkura (1978)
- Zamřížované zrcadlo (1978)
