= Jaroslav Moučka =

Czech actor (1923–2009)

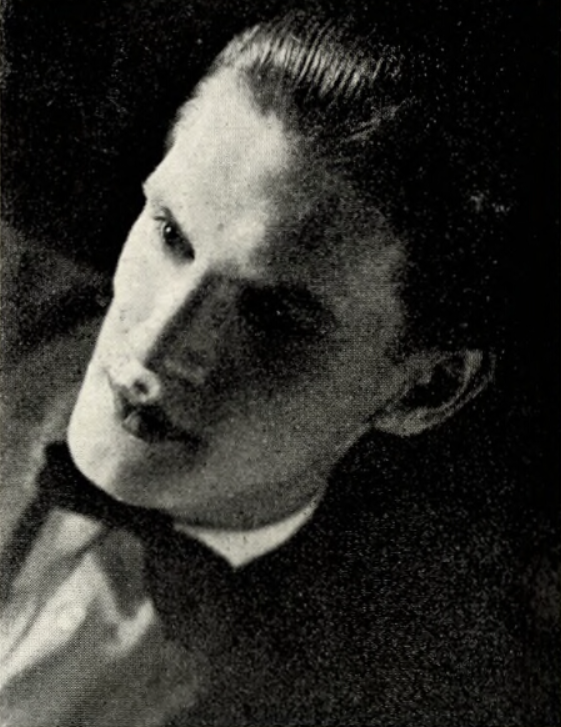
- Moučka in 1948
- Born: 9 November 1923; Studená, Czechoslovakia
- Died: 26 December 2009 (aged 86); Prague, Czechia
- Occupation: Actor
- Years active: 1954–2000

Jaroslav Moučka (9 November 1923 – 26 December 2009) was a Czech actor. He performed in more than eighty films between 1954 and 2000.

== Selected filmography ==
Film
Year	Title	Role	Notes
1961	The Night Guest	Driver Mikeš	
1967	Marketa Lazarová	Jan	
1967	The Nun's Night	Farmer Vitásek	
1970	The Ear	Vagera	
1971	Four Murders Are Enough, Darling	Tom	
1978	Krabat – The Sorcerer's Apprentice	Master (voice)	

TV
Year	Title	Role	Notes
1981	Okres na severu		
1979	Plechová kavalérie		
1979	Hospital at the End of the City	Kovanda	
1975	Chalupáři		
