= Jana Preissová =

Czech actress

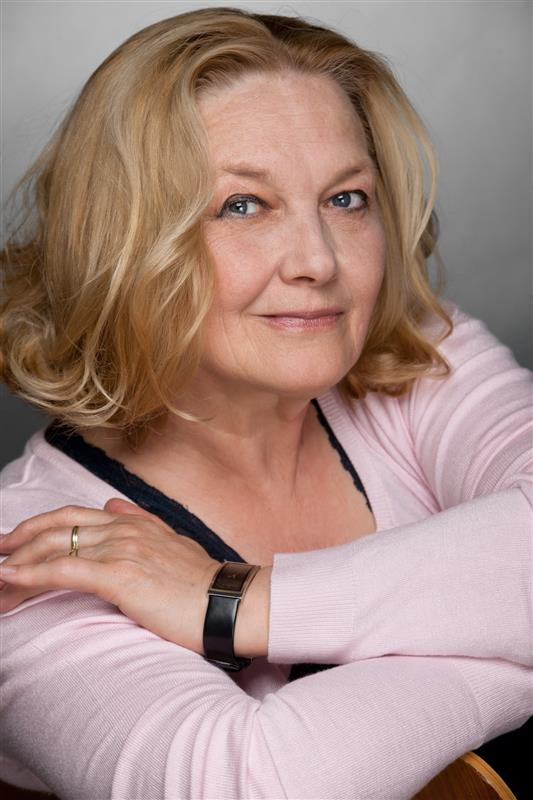
- Jana Preissová, 2013
- Born: Jana Drchalová; 7 February 1948 (age 77); Rokycany, Plzeň, Czechoslovakia
- Occupation: Actress
- Years active: 1968–present
- Spouse: Viktor Preiss (m. 1969)
- Children: 2, including Martin Preiss

Jana Preissová (née Drchalová; born 7 February 1948) is a Czech film and stage actress. She won a Czech Lion for Best Supporting Actress at the 1994 Czech Lion Awards, for her role in the film Řád. She has also been recognised as the Best Female Performance twice at the František Filipovský Awards for dubbing, in 1995 and 1998.

She is married to actor Viktor Preiss and has two sons, Jan (computer graphic designer) and Martin Preiss, who is also an actor.

== Selected filmography ==
- Capricious Summer (1968)
- Crime in a Music Hall (1968)
- Jak vytrhnout velrybě stoličku (1976)
- Jak dostat tatínka do polepšovny (1978)
- Dobrá čtvrť (television, 2005–2008)
