= Petr Kostka =

Czech actor (born 1938)

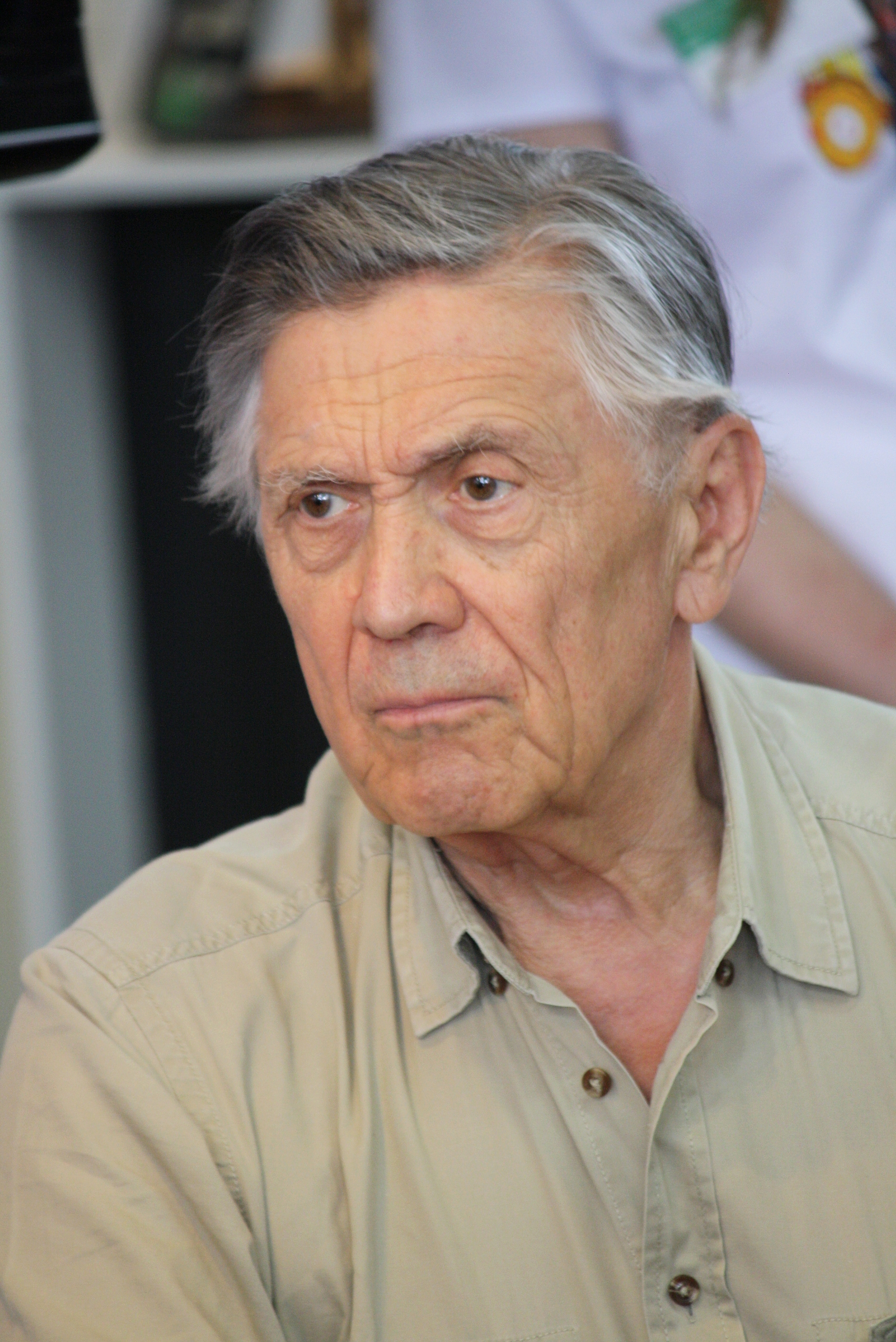
- Petr Kostka in 2013
- Born: 11 June 1938 (age 87); Říčany, Czechoslovakia
- Occupation: Actor
- Years active: 1959–present
- Relatives: Tereza Kostková (daughter)

Petr Kostka (born 11 June 1938) is a Czech actor.

Kostka was born in Říčany near Prague, Czechoslovakia. In 2003, he received Thalia Award for performing Herman in Smíšené pocity Mixed Emotions.

== Selected filmography ==
- Fetters (1961)
- A Jester's Tale (1964)
- Zítra vstanu a opařím se čajem (1977)
- Což takhle dát si špenát (1977)
- Jára Cimrman Lying, Sleeping (1983)
- Fešák Hubert (1984)
- Inženýrská odysea
