= Dobrodružství kriminalistiky =

1989 television series by Antonín Moskalyk

- Countries of origin: Czechoslovakia/Czech Republic; West Germany/Germany
- Original language: Czech
- No. of seasons: 4
- No. of episodes: 26

Production
- Running time: 52 minutes

Original release
- Network: Czech Television
- Release: 1989 – 1994

Dobrodružství kriminalistiky ("adventure of criminalistics") is a television series directed by Antonín Moskalyk. It has 26 episodes and was filmed in four seasons over years 1989, 1991, 1992 and 1993.

It is a cycle of stories from different historical periods. In each of the episodes, viewers have the opportunity to look into the beginnings of individual criminology disciplines. The series features real historical figures and almost authentic cases (though modified for the needs of the stories).

The series was filmed in co-production with the German company Schwarzwald Film, Krátký film Praha and the company Gofis, spol. s r. o.

== Cast and characters ==
- Boris Rösner as Eugène François Vidocq (episode 1)
- Viktor Preiss as a lawyer Paillet (episode 2)
- Anke Sevenichová as Marie Lafarge (episode 2)
- Ondřej Havelka as office worker Alphonse Bertillon (episode 3)
- Petr Kostka as sergeant Joseph Faurot (episode 4 and 20)
- Dušan Blaškovič as Lofter (episode 4)
- Luděk Munzar as a gunsmith Robert Churchill (episode 5)
- Oliver Stritzel as a bacteriologist Paul Uhlenhuth (episode 6)
- Nelly Gaierová as Klára Grosby (episode 7)
- Vlasta Fabianová as Eleonora Rawlison (episode 7)
- Jiří Adamíra as Gustav Schraepel (episode 7)
- Petr Haničinec as a lawyer and writer Henry Fielding (episode 10)
- Karel Heřmánek as Ladislav Havlíček (episode 14)
- Eduard Cupák as detective Fasaroli (episode 15)
- Andrej Hryc as malíř a Han van Meegeren (episode 16)
- Stanislav Zindulka as Max von Stephanitz (episode 19)
- Siegfried Lowitz as commissar Benhamou (episode 21)
- Jiří Schmitzer as Giulio Canella resp. Mario Bruneri (episode 26)
- Despina Pajanou as his wife (episode 26)
- Pavol Mikulík as policeman (episode 26)

== Episodes ==
=== Season 1 ===
| No. in season | Title | Directed by | Written by | Original release date | Czech viewers (millions) |
|---|---|---|---|---|---|
| 1 | "Stopa" | Antonín Moskalyk | Jan Šikl and Antonín Moskalyk | 11 November 1989 | TBA |
| 2 | "Jed" | Antonín Moskalyk | Ondřej Štindl | 18 November 1989 | TBA |
| 3 | "Bertillonáž" | Antonín Moskalyk | Ondřej Štindl | 2 December 1989 | TBA |
| 4 | "Otisk" | Antonín Moskalyk | Jan Šikl and Antonín Moskalyk | 9 December 1989 | TBA |
| 5 | "Střela" | Antonín Moskalyk | Ondřej Štindl | 16 December 1989 | TBA |
| 6 | "Krev" | Antonín Moskalyk | Ondřej Štindl | 22 December 1989 | TBA |
| 7 | "Rekonstrukce" | Antonín Moskalyk | Ondřej Štindl | 29 December 1989 | TBA |
| 8 | "Tým" | Antonín Moskalyk | Ondřej Štindl | 6 January 1990 | TBA |

=== Season 2 ===
| No. in season | Title | Directed by | Written by | Original release date | Czech viewers (millions) |
|---|---|---|---|---|---|
| 1 | "Písmo" | Antonín Moskalyk | Pavlína Moskalyková and Antonín Moskalyk | 9 January 1992 | TBA |
| 2 | "První detektivní sbor" | Antonín Moskalyk | Jan Šikl and Antonín Moskalyk | 16 January 1992 | TBA |
| 3 | "Modus operandi" | Antonín Moskalyk | Jan Šikl and Antonín Moskalyk | 23 January 1992 | TBA |
| 4 | "Antropologie" | Antonín Moskalyk | Antonín Moskalyk | 30 January 1992 | TBA |
| 5 | "Krevní skupina" | Antonín Moskalyk | Antonín Moskalyk | 6 February 1992 | TBA |
| 6 | "Mechanoskopie" | Antonín Moskalyk | Pavlína Moskalyková and Antonín Moskalyk | 13 February 1992 | TBA |
| 7 | "Identifikační kresba" | Antonín Moskalyk | Jan Šikl and Antonín Moskalyk | 20 February 1992 | TBA |
| 8 | "Paprsek" | Antonín Moskalyk | Pavlína Moskalyková and Antonín Moskalyk | 27 February 1992 | TBA |

=== Season 3 ===
| No. in season | Title | Directed by | Written by | Original release date | Czech viewers (millions) |
|---|---|---|---|---|---|
| 1 | "Pinkertonova detektivní agentura" | Antonín Moskalyk | Jan Šikl and Antonín Moskalyk | 5 January 1994 | TBA |
| 2 | "Poslední odvolání" | Antonín Moskalyk | Jan Šikl and Antonín Moskalyk | 12 January 1994 | TBA |
| 3 | "Pes" | Antonín Moskalyk | Pavlína Moskalyková and Antonín Moskalyk | 19 January 1994 | TBA |
| 4 | "Duplikát" | Antonín Moskalyk | Antonín Moskalyk | 26 January 1994 | TBA |
| 5 | "Padělek" | Antonín Moskalyk | Pavlína Moskalyková and Antonín Moskalyk | 2 February 1994 | TBA |

=== Season 4 ===
| No. in season | Title | Directed by | Written by | Original release date | Czech viewers (millions) |
|---|---|---|---|---|---|
| 1 | "Hon na rozhlasových vlnách" | Antonín Moskalyk | Jan Šikl and Antonín Moskalyk | 9 February 1994 | TBA |
| 2 | "Volavka" | Antonín Moskalyk | Pavlína Moskalyková and Antonín Moskalyk | 16 February 1994 | TBA |
| 3 | "Volavka" | Antonín Moskalyk | Jan Šikl and Antonín Moskalyk | 23 February 1994 | TBA |
| 4 | "Vlas" | Antonín Moskalyk | Pavlína Moskalyková and Antonín Moskalyk | 2 March 1994 | TBA |
| 5 | "Neznámý" | Antonín Moskalyk | Antonín Moskalyk | 9 March 1994 | TBA |
