= Věra Tichánková =

Czech actress (1920–2014)

- Born: 7 December 1920; Žarnovická Huta, Czechoslovakia (present-day Slovakia)
- Died: 9 January 2014 (aged 93); Prague, Czech Republic
- Education: Institute of Chemical Technology in Prague
- Occupation: Actress
- Years active: 1940–2014
- Spouse: Jan Skopeček

Věra Tichánková (7 December 1920 – 9 January 2014) was a Czech actress, whose career spanned over seven decades.

== Biography ==
In her youth, she was interested in chemistry, which she also began to study at the University of Chemical Technology. However, she did not complete this study, because the Nazis closed all universities during the Protectorate. So she began to study acting at the Prague Conservatory, but she did not complete this study either, because during the Nazi occupation she was active in the anti-Nazi resistance, helping to obtain food stamps for people in illegality. At that time, she was arrested and imprisoned by the Nazis for two years, first in Terezín, later in Dresden, where she survived a major Allied air raid on the night of February 13-14, 1945. From there, the Nazis transferred her to Leipzig.

She married actor and playwright Jan Skopeček.

Věra Tichánková died on 9 January 2014, aged 93, in Prague, Czech Republic.
