= Jan Skopeček (actor) =

Czech playwright and actor (1925–2020)

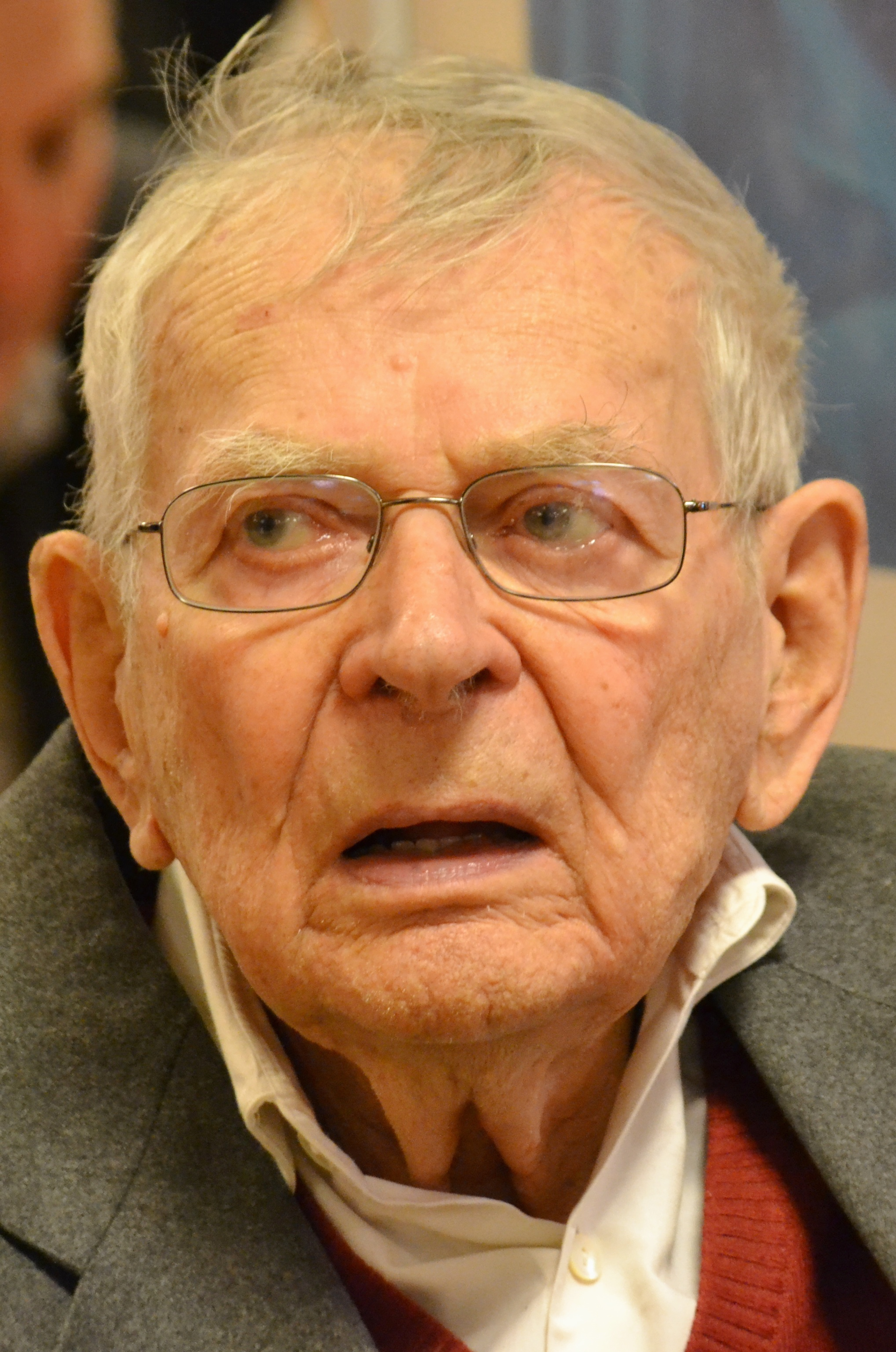
- Jan Skopeček in November 2013.
- Born: 19 September 1925; Litoměřice, Czechoslovakia
- Died: 27 July 2020 (aged 94); Prague, Czech Republic
- Occupations: Actor, playwright
- Years active: 1949–2020
- Spouse(s): Věra Tichánková (m. 1950s; died 2014)

Jan Skopeček (19 September 1925 – 27 July 2020) was a Czech actor and playwright.

== Biography ==
Born in Litoměřice, Skopeček began his acting career in 1949, appearing in numerous plays. He was married to actress Věra Tichánková; the couple remained together until Tichánková's death in January 2014.

Skopeček died on 27 July 2020 at the age of 94.

== Selected filmography ==
- Hroch (1973)
- Tam, kde hnízdí čápi (1975)
