= The Youngest of the Hamr Family =

Czechoslovak television series

- Genre: Drama
- Written by: Jaroslav Dietl
- Directed by: Evžen Sokolovský
- Country of origin: Czechoslovakia
- No. of episodes: 11

Production
- Running time: 43–75 minutes

Original release
- Release: 1975

The Youngest of the Hamr Family (Czech: Nejmladší z rodu Hamrů) is a Czechoslovak television series first broadcast in 1975. The show was written by Jaroslav Dietl and directed by Evžen Sokolovský.
