= Muž na radnici =

Czechoslovak television series

- Genre: Drama
- Directed by: Evžen Sokolovský
- Country of origin: Czechoslovakia
- No. of episodes: 11

Production
- Running time: 60 minutes
- Production company: Ceskoslovenská televize

Original release
- Release: 1976

Muž na radnici was a Czechoslovak television program which was broadcast in 1976. The program was directed by Evžen Sokolovský. In 2011, it was announced that the program, along with 17 others, would be released on DVD within three years.
