= Jiří Adamíra =

Czech actor (1926–1993)

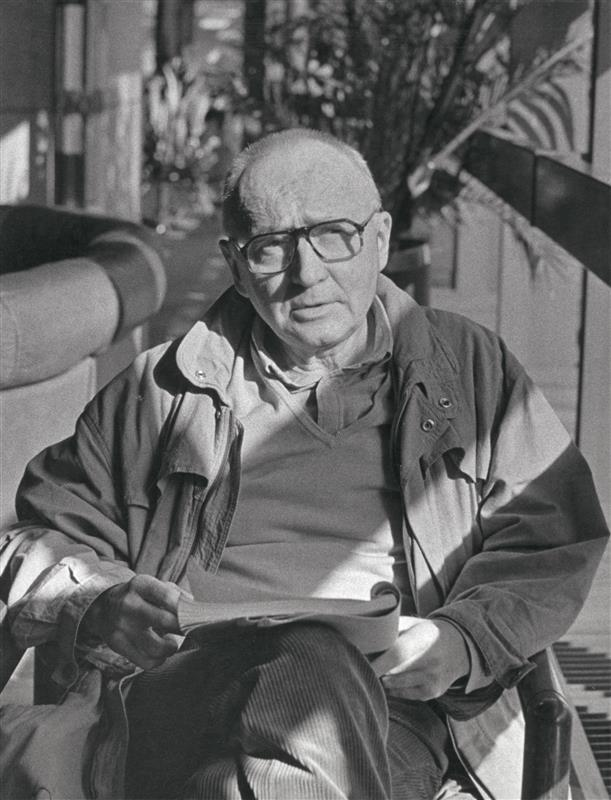
- Born: 2 April 1926; Dobrovice, Czechoslovakia
- Died: 14 August 1993 (aged 67); Prague, Czech Republic
- Occupation: Actor
- Years active: 1950-1993

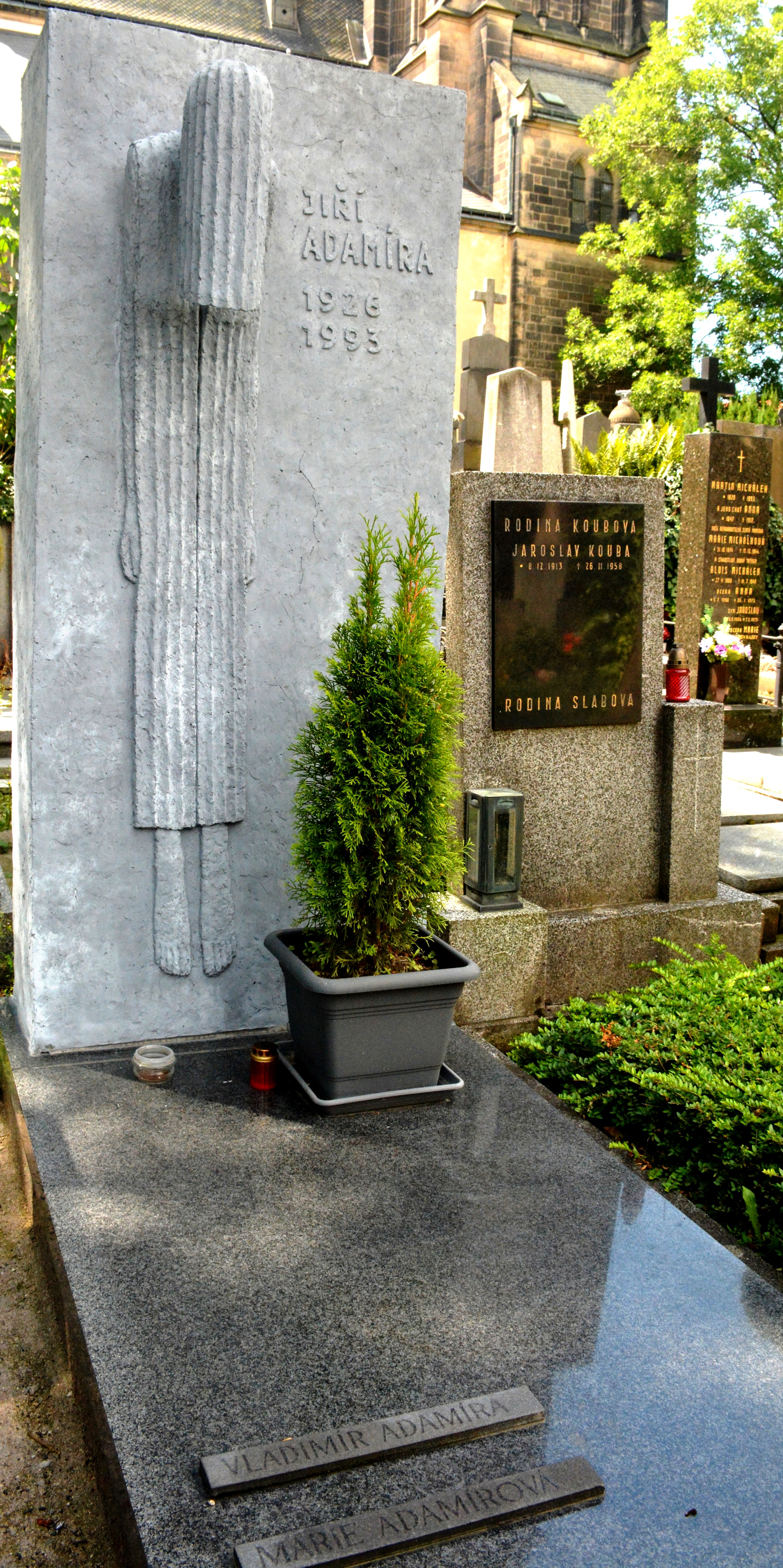
Grave of Jiří Adamíra at Vyšehrad Cemetery

Jiří Adamíra (2 April 1926 in Dobrovice – 14 August 1993 in Prague) was a Czech actor. Adamíra began as an actor in the season 1945–1946 and from 1946 to 1950 worked under the director Jiří Dalík in the theatre. He later appeared in 21 films between 1952 and 1989, and in 22 television series.

== Life ==
He graduated from the grammar school in Prague-Vršovice and the Secondary Technical School in Smíchov. During the Second World War, he performed in amateur theater groups.

He played in several films, television productions and serials, but he achieved his success in the theater. He started playing in the theater in 1945. In the 1950s, he debuted in cinema. He performed at the State Theater in Ostrava between 1952 and 1962. He then joined the Švandovo divadlo Theater in Prague, where he worked from 1962 to 1990.

== Selected filmography ==
- ... a pátý jezdec je Strach
- Jeden z nich je vrah
- Podezření
- Modlitba pro Kateřinu Horowitzovou
- Příběh lásky a cti
- Božská Ema
- Nevěsta k zulíbání
- Oldřich a Božena
- Hra v oblacích
- Lev s bílou hřívou
- Poločas štěstí
- Stíhán a podezřelý
- Třicet případů majora Zemana
- Dobrodružství kriminalistiky
