= Kamila Magálová =

Slovak actress (born 1950)

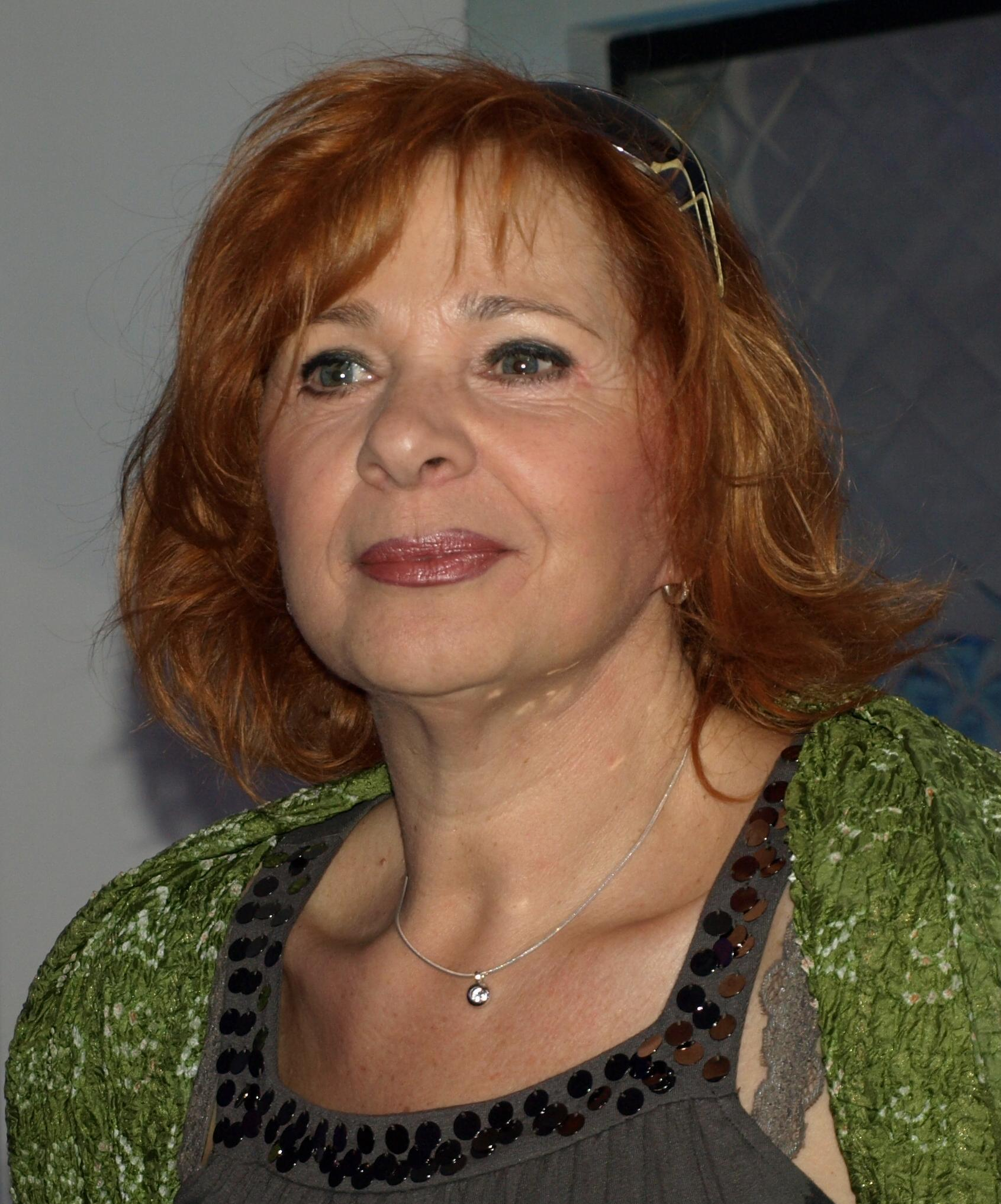
- Magálová in 2012
- Born: Kamila Slováková; 16 November 1950 (age 75); Bratislava, Czechoslovakia
- Education: Performing arts
- Alma mater: VŠMU, Bratislava (class of 1975)
- Occupations: Actress; singer; television presenter; entrepreneur
- Years active: 1972–present
- Employers: NS (1973–1982); SND (from 1982)
- Known for: Líbáš jako Bůh; Líbáš jako ďábel
- Spouse: Slavomír Magál (div. 2012)
- Children: 2
- Relatives: Ladislav Slovák; Marián Slovák

Kamila Magálová (née Slováková; born 16 November 1950) is a Slovak film and stage actress, singer, and entrepreneur. She is a triple nominee for the TV-based OTO Awards. In addition to the performing arts, Magálová runs a hotel named after her in Čierna Voda.

== Biography ==
Magálová is the daughter of conductor Ladislav Slovák and sister of actor Marián Slovák. She raised two children, a daughter and a son, who died in 2024.

She studied acting at the Academy of Performing Arts in Bratislava, graduating in 1975. From 1973 to 1982, she was a member of the Poetic Ensemble of the New Stage (Poetický Súbor Novej Scény) in Bratislava, and since 1982, she has been a member of the Slovak National Theatre Drama department (Činohra Slovenského Národného Divadla), also in Bratislava.

Magálová is known to film audiences as one of the lead characters in the Marie Poledňáková films Líbáš jako Bůh (2009) and Líbáš jako ďábel (2012).

In 2012, she divorced Slavomír Magál, with whom she has two children, son Martin and daughter Daniela. Kamila has three grandchildren: Maria, Nina, and Gregor. Together with her ex-husband, she is the co-owner of the Kamila Hotel in Čierna Voda, Chorvátsky Grob, where she also lives.

Magálová has been a UNICEF Goodwill Ambassador representing Slovakia since 1995.

== Selected filmography ==
List of appearances, with year, title, and role shown
Year	Title	Role	Notes
2009	Líbáš jako Bůh	Helena	Feature film
2010	Odsúdené	Tatiana Majerová	Television series
2012	Líbáš jako ďábel	Helena	Feature film

== Discography ==
- Dvanásť do tucta – Diskotéka Opusu 6 – Opus 9113 1047 , (1980) – "Vraj si vážny" – Kamila Magálová and Bezinky (Pavel Zajáček / Peter Petiška, Tomáš Janovic)

== Awards and recognition ==
People's Choice polls
Year	Nominated work	Award	Category	Result
1998	Herself	Slávik Awards	Singer	#22
1999	Herself	Slávik Awards	Singer	#28
2000	Herself	Slávik Awards	Singer	#32
2000	Herself	OTO Awards	TV actress	Nominated
2001	Herself	Slávik Awards	Singer	#43
2002	Herself	OTO Awards	TV actress	Nominated
2003	Herself	OTO Awards	TV actress	Nominated

== See also ==
- List of OTO Award winners and nominees
