= Jiří Štěpnička =

Czech actor and dubber (1947–2026)

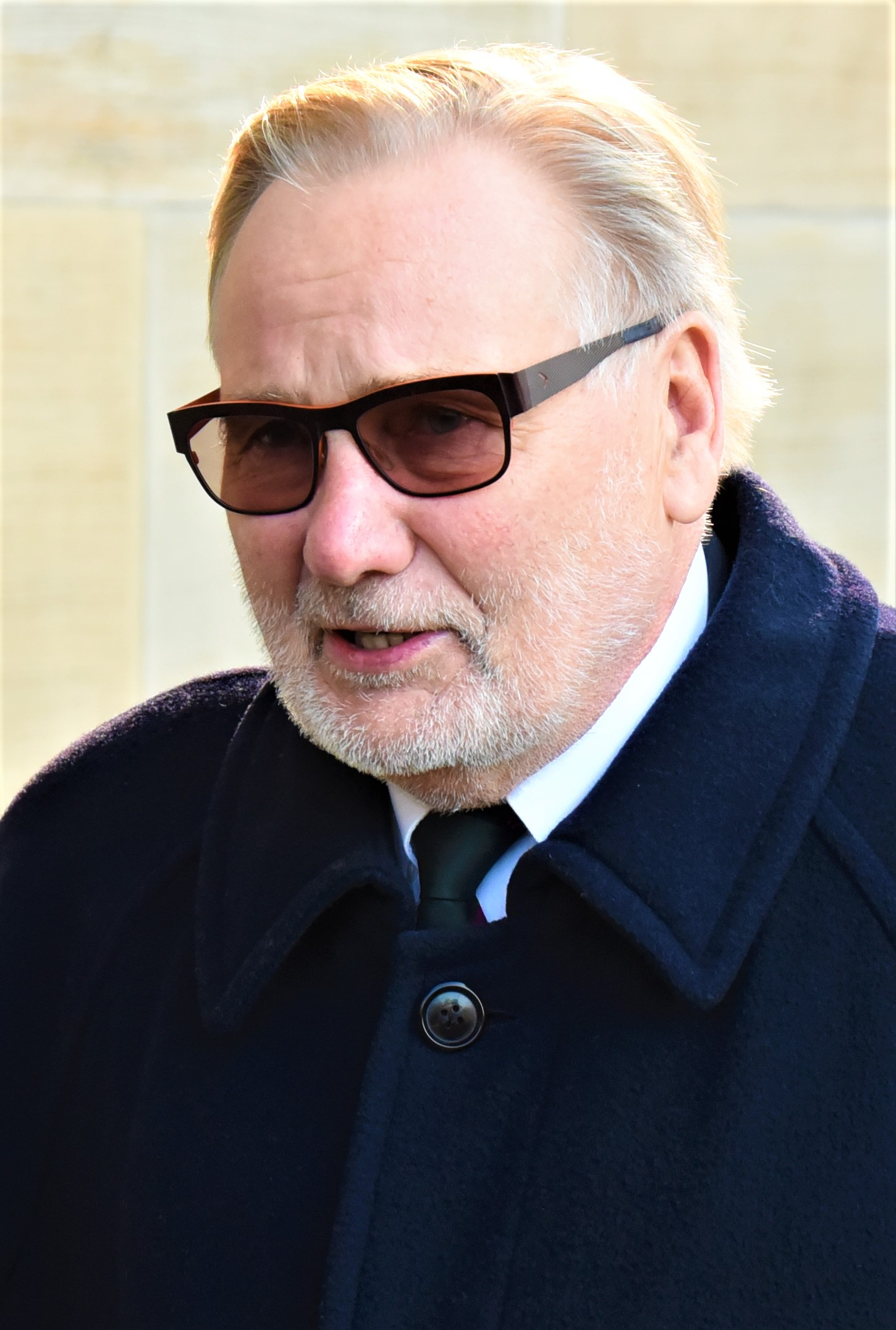
- Jiří Štěpnička (2019)
- Born: Jiří Samec; 16 April 1947; London, England
- Died: 11 October 2026 (aged 79)
- Occupation: Actor
- Years active: 1969–2026
- Relatives: Jiřina Štěpničková (mother); Jan Samec (father)

Signature
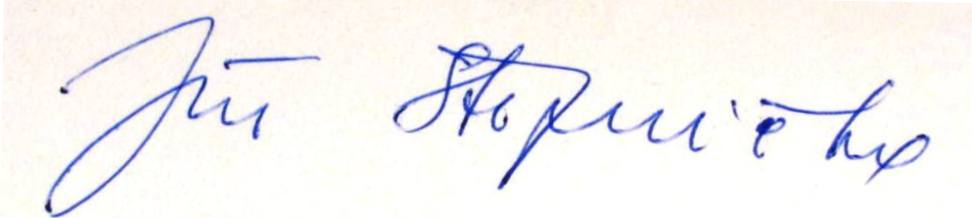

Jiří Štěpnička (16 April 1947 – 11 October 2026) was a Czech actor and dubber.

== Life and career ==
He was the son of the Czech actress Jiřina Štěpničková (1912-1985) and Jan Samec (1917-1988), a drawing teacher from Strakonice, whom Jiřina Štěpničková married shortly before her son's birth. He acquired British citizenship by virtue of his birthplace and was given five names at his baptism, honoring his godparents: Jiří Jan Jaroslav Martin Otto. One of his godfathers was Jan Masaryk, the son of President Tomáš Garrigue Masaryk.

After the family returned to Czechoslovakia, Jiřina Štěpničková was sidelined in her acting career; misled by a forged letter from director František Čap, she attempted to emigrate by crossing the border in the Šumava region with her four-year old son in her arms. The guide, General Hruška, was an informant for the State Security service; he detained her, and she was sentenced to 15 years in prison. She remained incarcerated until an amnesty was granted after ten years, while her son was raised by his father and his father's partner in Karlovy Vary, where Jiří attended elementary school. Jiří Štěpnička later completed his secondary education at the Jan Neruda Grammar School in Prague's Lesser Town, where his classmates included Jaromír Hanzlík and Martin Štěpánek.

When he was 13, his mother returned from prison to her son, and thanks to director Martin Frič, they lived in the Hodkovičky neighborhood of Prague 4.

After completing his acting studies at DAMU in Prague in 1969, and following the advice of Vojtěch Kabeláč, he first worked at the Klicpera Theatre in Hradec Králové (until 1972) before moving to the National Theatre in Brno. From 1975, he was a permanent member of the Drama Company of the National Theatre in Prague.

He also acted in Czech films and television productions such as the propagandistic five-part series Gottwald (1986) and the highly popular, frequently rerun series Vyprávěj, in which he played the role of office manager Radek Krása. He provided Czech dubbing for actors such as Harrison Ford, Michael Douglas, Steven Seagal, and Gérard Depardieu.

Jiří Štěpnička was a widower; with his wife Jana (who died in 2022), he had a son, Jakub, and a daughter, Judita. He died on 11 October 2026, at the age of 79.

== Selected filmography ==
=== Film ===
- Pasáček z doliny (1983)
- How Poets Are Losing Their Illusions (1985)
- Victims and Murderers (2000)
- In the Shadow (2012)

=== Television ===
- Okres na severu (1980)
- Terapie (2011)
- Modrý kód (2017)
- Sestřičky (2020)

=== Theatre ===
- Naši furianti

== Awards ==
- Thalia Awards: 2010
