= Modrý kód =

- Genre: Action; Drama; Comedy; Romantic
- Starring: Marek Němec, Sabina Laurinová, Saša Rašilov, Tomáš Měcháček
- Country of origin: Czech Republic
- Original language: Czech
- No. of seasons: 4
- No. of episodes: 264

Production
- Running time: 55 minutes

Modrý kód (English: 'Blue Code') is a Czech medical television series broadcast on Prima televize. The plot of the series focuses on the emergency department. Each episode follows cases inspired by real-life stories and the cases of patients and healthcare professionals.

It was followed by Sestřičky and 1. mise.

== Cast ==
- Marek Němec as MUDr. David Hofbauer
- Sabina Laurinová as Bc. Marie Černá
- Eva Josefíková as MUDr. Lucie Krutinová
- Roman Zach as MUDr. Roman Nikolajev Vilkin (Rasputin)
- Jiří Štěpnička as doc. MUDr. Jiří Bojan, DrSc.
- Igor Chmela as MUDr. Viktor Žák
- Marika Procházková as MUDr. Valentina Slavíčková (Vali)
- Ondřej Rychlý as MUDr. Prokop Hlinka
- Eva Burešová as Petra Horvátová
- Filip Cíl as Jan Čermák (Honza)
- Lenka Zahradnická as Jana Kočová
- Sandra Nováková as MUDr. Alexandra Růžičková (Saša)
- Mojmír Maděrič as MUDr. Miloš Valenta
- Roman Skamene as Roman Váňa
- Viktor Limr as MUDr. Aleš Nývlt
- Kristýna Frejová as MUDr. Ema Vlčková
- Berenika Kohoutová as MUDr. Zoja Višněvská
- David Gránský as MUDr. Matyáš Bojan (Maty)
- Anastázie Chocholatá as Eva Zemánková
- Petr Konáš as MUDr. Filip Kodym
- Michaela Sejnová as Libuše Volejníková (Libuška)
- Adam Kraus as Benedikt Lichý (Ben)
- Jana Stryková as MUDr. Nina Mrázová
- Tomáš Měcháček as MUDr. Adam Brejcha
- Renata Prokopová as Bc. Šárka Pokorná
- Petr Buchta as MUDr. Kamil Prchlík
- Vanda Chaloupková as MUDr. Veronika Jánská
- Saša Rašilov as MUDr. Michal Tomášek
- Marko Igonda as MUDr. Marián Klimko
- Patricie Pagáčová as JUDr. Bc. Laura Hrdinová, MBA
- Zuzana Bydžovská as MUDr. Jana Mašková
- Alois Švehlík as doc. MUDr. Milan Šeřík
- Štěpánka Fingerhutová as Dita Stárková
