= FurryBall =

3D unbiased rendering software

FurryBall GPU Render

- Developer: Art And Animation studio
- Stable release: v RT
- Operating system: Windows Vista and later
- Type: Rendering system
- License: Trialware
- Website: furryball.aaa-studio.eu

FurryBall is 3D computer graphics software and plug-in for real-time GPU production quality unbiased rendering. It is also a biased final frame renderer used for many short and full length animated movies. FurryBall was used for rendering the feature animated movie Goat story with Cheese - it was probably the first world feature animated movie rendered completely only on GPU in 2012.

== Overview ==
FurryBall RT offers advanced rendering techniques, implemented directly into Autodesk Maya, Autodesk 3ds Max and Cinema 4D with multi-GPU support. FurryBall was developed for in-house Art And Animation studio purposes since 2009. FurryBall was used for rendering a whole feature movie, Goat Story 2 in 2008. It's probably the first world rendered CGI feature movie for cinemas rendered only on GPUs.

In 2015, the latest version of FurryBall RT was released with a completely rewritten core.

== Features ==
FurryBall Render (commercial version) comes with free export scripts for the following software:

PLUGINS

- Autodesk 3ds Max
- Autodesk Maya
- Cinema 4D
