= Vinaři =

2014 Czech TV series

- Genre: Comedy
- Directed by: Jiří Vejdělek, Vojtěch Moravec, Dan Wlodarczyk, Martin Kopp, Petr Nikolaev
- Starring: Václav Postránecký; Tereza Kostková; Miroslav Táborský; Jitka Smutná; Hynek Čermák; Zdeněk Junák; Pavel Liška
- Country of origin: Czech Republic
- Original language: Czech
- No. of seasons: 2
- No. of episodes: 32

Production
- Running time: 55 minutes

Original release
- Network: Prima televize
- Release: August 31, 2014 – December 13, 2015

Vinaři (Winemakers) is a Czech television series from Prima televize. It is set in South Moravia and was broadcast by Prima station from 31 August 2014 to 13 December 2015. It was written by Petr Kolečko. This is the third series of this television in 2014.[4] The first season had a total of 16 episodes, which aired from late August to mid-December 2014 every Sunday in prime time. The subtitle reads: "A series about wine and the people around it". The opening song "Wine" is performed by the band Chinaski. On 9 June 2015, the preparation of the second season was confirmed, and the broadcast of which began on 30 August of the same year. With the transfer of the story from South Moravia to Polabí, the opening song also underwent textual changes.

The second season of the series was nominated for the Czech Lion in the category Best Dramatic TV Series, but did not win the award.

== Cast ==
- Václav Postránecký as Bedřich Pavlíček
- Tereza Kostková as Kateřina Hýsková
- Miroslav Táborský as Jan Fuksa
- Jitka Smutná as Stázi Pavlíčková
- Hynek Čermák as František Vlček
- Zdeněk Junák as Olin Vlček
- Pavel Liška as Miroslav Tomica
- Jan Brožek as Bedřich „Buddy“ Hýsek
- Alžběta Vaculčiaková as Petra Hýsková
- Anna Fialová as Julie Vlčková
- Pavel Nečas as Patrik Tauš
- Lucie Benešová as Hedvika Taušová
- Tomáš Materna as Michal Tauš
- Oldřich Navrátil as Vladimír Luža
- Tomáš Matonoha as Jakub „Hřéba“ Hřebec
- Lukáš Langmajer as „Machr“ Macháček
- Robert Nebřenský as Ludvík „Luis“ König
- Jana Paulová as Jiřina Straková
- Radim Novák as Pepan
- Jakub Uličník as Eduard
- Jitka Čvančarová as Jana Hamplová
- Leoš Noha as Chrudoš
- Pavel Šimčík as „Hrouda“
- Petr Vaněk as Láďa Karas
- Jiří Vyorálek as Waldemar
- Zuzana Norisová as Monika Waldemarová
- Eliška Křenková as Klára Hamplová
- Vojtěch Záveský as Jožin Chrudoš
- Johana Freywaldová as Gábina Karasová
- Anežka Rusevová as Sumečková
- Marek Taclík as Zdeněk Barták
- Laďka Něrgešová as Jaruna Bartáková
- Ester Kočičková as Jitka Zelenková
- Vojtěch Machuta as Venoušek Zelenka
- Lenka Jurošková as Blanka Zelenková
