= Líbáš jako ďábel =

2012 Czech comedy film

- Directed by: Marie Poledňáková
- Written by: Marie Poledňáková
- Screenplay by: Marie Poledňáková
- Produced by: Jan Bradáč; Svatka Peschková
- Starring: Jiří Bartoška; Kamila Magálová; Oldřich Kaiser; Eva Holubová
- Cinematography: Vladimír Smutný
- Edited by: Adam Dvořák
- Music by: Petr Malásek
- Distributed by: Falcon
- Release date: 17 May 2012
- Running time: 108 minutes
- Country: Czech Republic
- Language: Czech

Líbáš jako ďábel (You Kiss Like a Devil) is a 2012 Czech comedy directed by Marie Poledňáková. It is a sequel to Poledňáková's 2009 comedy You Kiss like a God and includes the lead cast from the previous film, Jiří Bartoška, Kamila Magálová, Oldřich Kaiser, and Eva Holubová.

== Plot ==
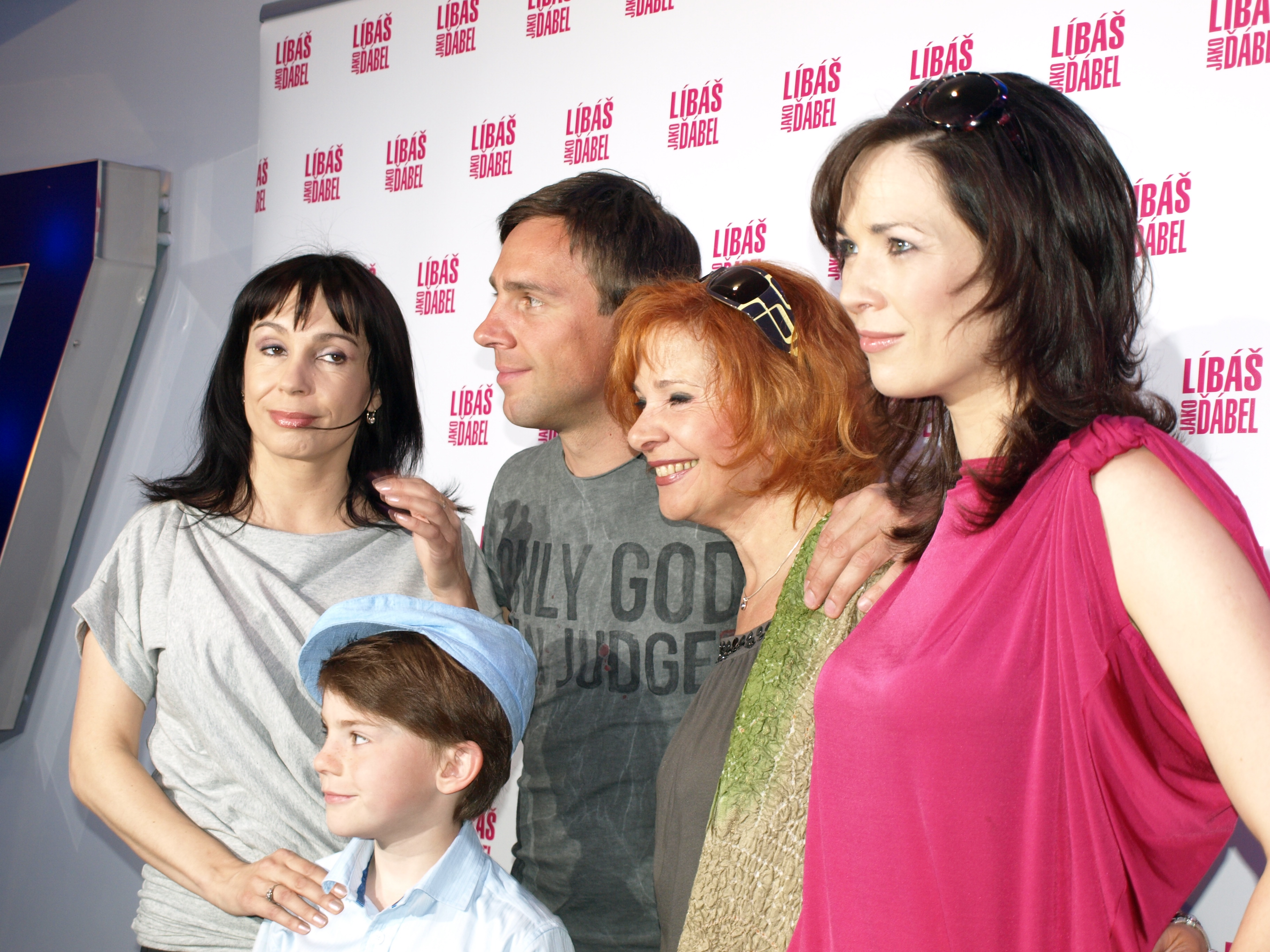
Press conference with the film's cast

The story revisits the lives of the main characters from the film You Kiss like a God. Successful writer Karel has finally moved out of his ex-wife's apartment and is living the life of an adventurer, though something seems to be missing. Bohunka, František's ex-wife, suffers from increasingly severe depression after her husband's departure. Both she and Karel wish to get back with their exes. František and Helena, who are still together, want peace and quiet, so they fly on a well-deserved vacation to Morocco. But even in Africa, they cannot avoid trouble. Their former partners begin to creep back into their lives. Their getaway in Morocco proves to be a test of their mutual love.

== Cast ==
- Kamila Magálová as Helena
- Jiří Bartoška as Karel
- Oldřich Kaiser as František
- Eva Holubová as Bohunka
- Nela Boudová as Kristýna
- Jiří Langmajer as Láďa
- Tereza Kostková as Monika
- Martha Issová as Bela
- Roman Vojtek as Adam
- Filip Antonio as Bastík
- Milan Šteindler as Béďa
- Petr Nárožný as the psychiatrist
- Sandra Pogodová as Miluška

== Release ==
The film premiered on 17 May 2012 after a press release held on 9 May 2012.
