= Goat Story 2 =

2012 Czech animated comedy

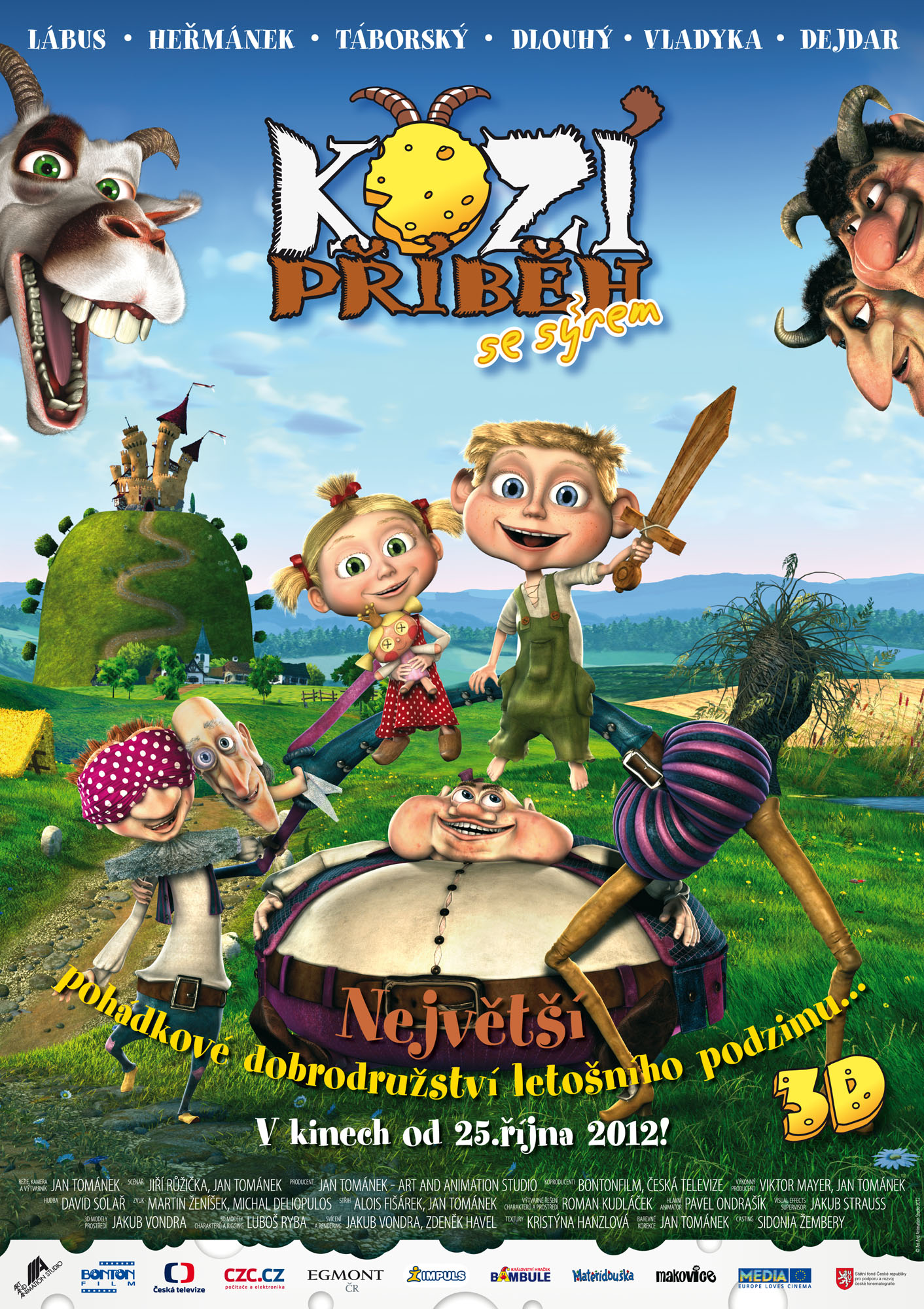
- Film Poster
- Directed by: Jan Tománek
- Written by: Jan Tománek; Jiří Růžička
- Produced by: Jan Tománek; Viktor Mayer
- Starring: Jiří Lábus; Mahulena Bočanová; Matěj Hádek; Michal Dlouhý; Martin Dejdar; Miroslav Vladyka; Miroslav Táborský; Karel Heřmánek; Milan Šteindler; Dalimil Klapka; Ota Jirák
- Edited by: Alois Fisarek
- Music by: David Solař
- Production company: Art And Animation studio
- Distributed by: Bonton Film
- Release date: October 25, 2012
- Running time: 85 minutes
- Country: Czech Republic
- Languages: Czech; English
- Box office: $837,373

Goat Story 2 is a 2012 Czech adult animated comedy feature film (Czech: Kozí příběh se sýrem). Directed by Jan Tománek and produced by Art And Animation studio, it is a sequel to the 2008 film Goat Story. The film was animated by a changed team from the first film, with animators joining the project from Spain, Bulgaria and India. The film was released in 2D and 3D and was rendered in in-house GPU renderer FurryBall.

== Plot ==
After the events of the first Goat Story, the Goat leaves old Prague for the fairy cheese kingdom and must save the parents of her new friends. The goat and her friends are joined by three sidekicks: Tall, Broad, and Sharp-eyed.

== Cast ==
The film stars the voices of:

- Jiří Lábus as Goat
- Matěj Hádek as Jemmy
- Mahulena Bočanová as Katie
- Michal Dlouhý as Matěj (cameo)/Broad
- Miroslav Táborský as Priest Ignác/Tall
- Karel Heřmánek as Devil / Leader
- Dalimil Klapka as Beggar
- Ota Jirák as Taverner
- Martin Dejdar as Student
- Miroslav Vladyka as Quickeye

== See also ==
- List of animated feature films
- List of computer-animated films
- List of musical films by year
