= Adventures of Robinson Crusoe, a Sailor from York =

- Directed by: Stanislav Látal
- Written by: Daniel Defoe (novel); Jirí Kubícek (screenplay); Stanislav Látal (screenplay)
- Cinematography: Jan Müller; Jirí Safár
- Edited by: Helena Lebdusková
- Music by: Karel Svoboda
- Release date: 1 April 1982
- Running time: 68 minutes
- Country: Czechoslovakia
- Language: Czech

Adventures of Robinson Crusoe, a Sailor from York (Czech: Dobrodružství Robinsona Crusoe, námořníka z Yorku) is a 1982 Czechoslovak stop motion-animated film, with animated flashbacks, directed by Stanislav Látal. The film is based on the 1719 novel Robinson Crusoe by Daniel Defoe.

== Voice cast ==
- Václav Postránecký as Robinson Crusoe
- Jiří Bruder
- Stanislav Fišer
- Dalimil Klapka
