= 1. mise =

- Genre: Action; Drama; Comedy; Romantic
- Starring: Jan Dolanský; Marek Němec; Pavel Řezníček; Kristýna Leichtová
- Country of origin: Czech Republic
- Original language: Czech
- No. of seasons: 1
- No. of episodes: 42

Production
- Running time: 55-60 minutes

Original release
- Release: August 29, 2021 – June 29, 2022

1. mise (English: 'First Mission') is a Czech military television series which was broadcast on TV Prima from 29 August 2021 to 29 June 2022. It was cancelled after season 1. It was a follow-up to the television series Modrý kód and Sestřičky.

== Cast ==
- Marek Němec as MUDr. David Hofbauer
- Jan Dolanský as plk. MUDr. Daniel Hofman
- Kristýna Leichtová as Mgr. Alice Hofmanová (roz. Jívová)
- Pavel Řezníček as plk. MUDr. Mgr. Vít Jelen
- Igor Chmela as MUDr. Viktor Žák
- Roman Zach as MUDr. Roman "Rasputin" Nikolajev Vilkin
- Vojtěch Efler as MUDr. Karel Vlach
- Adéla Gondíková as Mgr. Michaela Kratochvílová
- Amelie Pokorná Zedníčková as Andrea "Andy" Kratochvílová
