= Jan Tománek =

Czech director and writer

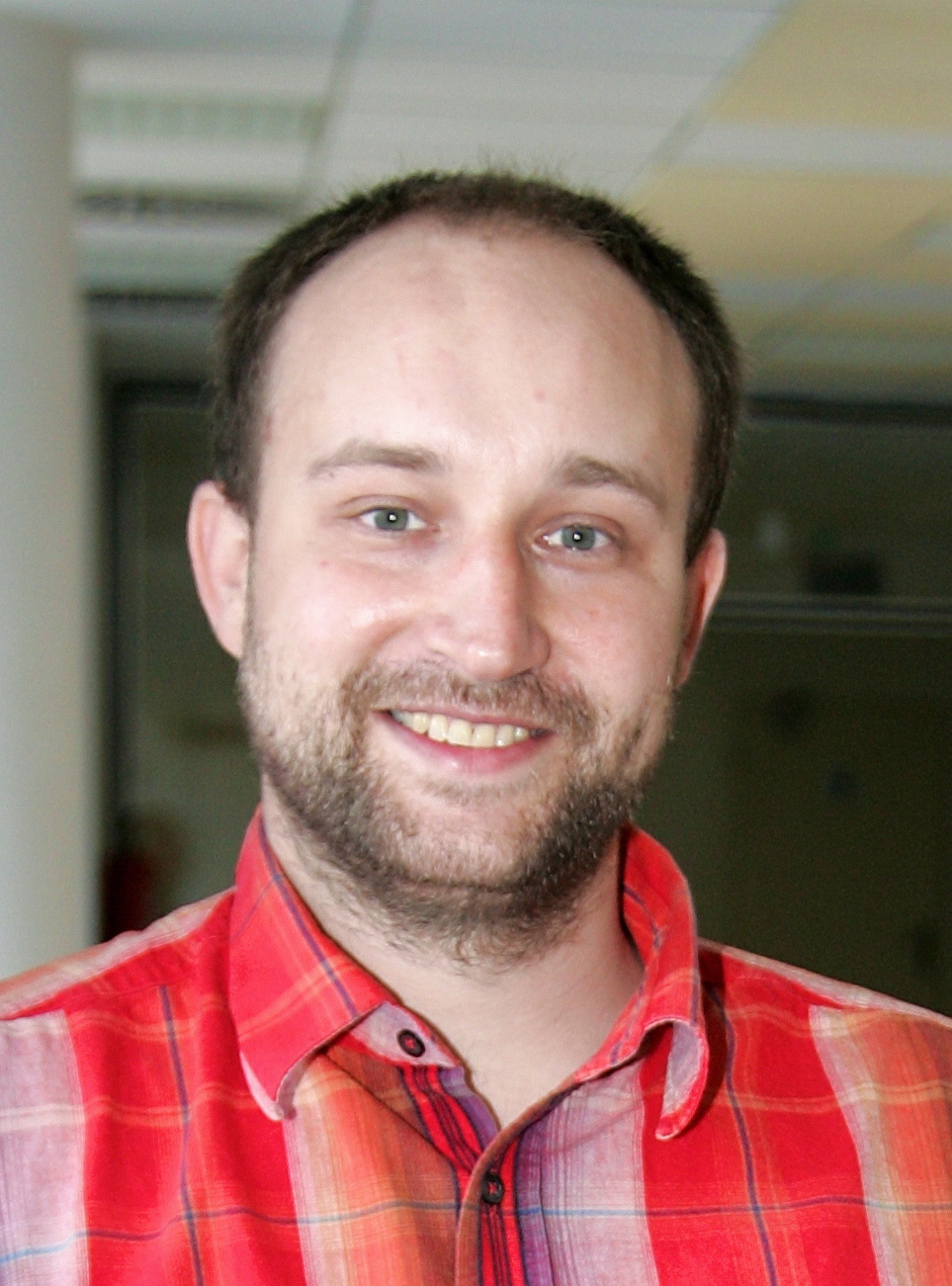
- Born: 14 February 1978 (age 48); Prague, Czechoslovakia
- Occupations: Director, writer
- Years active: 1997–present
- Notable work: Goat Story – The Old Prague Legends

Jan Tománek (born 14 February 1978) is a Czech movie director, writer and artist. He is the creator of animated movies Goat Story: The Old Prague Legends and Goat Story with Cheese. Today, he devotes most of his time to writing books.

== Biography ==
His father was the painter and graphic artist Jan Sarkandr Tománek. After graduating from the Václav Hollar Secondary School of Art and Design, Tománek studied from 1999 to 2005 at the Academy of Fine Arts in Prague, majoring in New Media under professor Michael Bielický and Veronika Bromová.

Between 1994 and 1996, as a student, he contributed to the gaming magazines Excalibur and Score, and founded the magazine Level, where he served as editor-in-chief in 1995. Since 2001, he has been a member of Mensa Czech Republic.

In 1997, he created his first short film Perpetuum mobile, which combined computer animation with live actors. During his studies at the Academy of Fine Arts in Prague, he made several short films — both live-action and animated, as well as combined. He participated in the creation of a project for Prague’s Laterna Magika (the performance Transmission disconnected), where he worked on combining live actors with computer animation. He also collaborated with his parents in the family studio Art And Animation Studio on a number of children’s films and animated bedtime stories for Czech Television. On his short films, he does almost everything alone, including script, directing, animation and post-production.

In 2008, he directed the film Kozí příběh – pověsti staré Prahy (Goat Story: Old Prague Legends), which became the most successful Czech animated film of all time.. In 2012, he completed its sequel Kozí příběh se sýrem (Goat Story with Cheese).

In November 2025, he founded his own social network X.Tomanek.com. It is built exclusively on personal invitations between users, which aims to prevent fake accounts and trolls.

Tománek has two children, a son named Jan and a daughter named Zuzana.

== Filmography ==
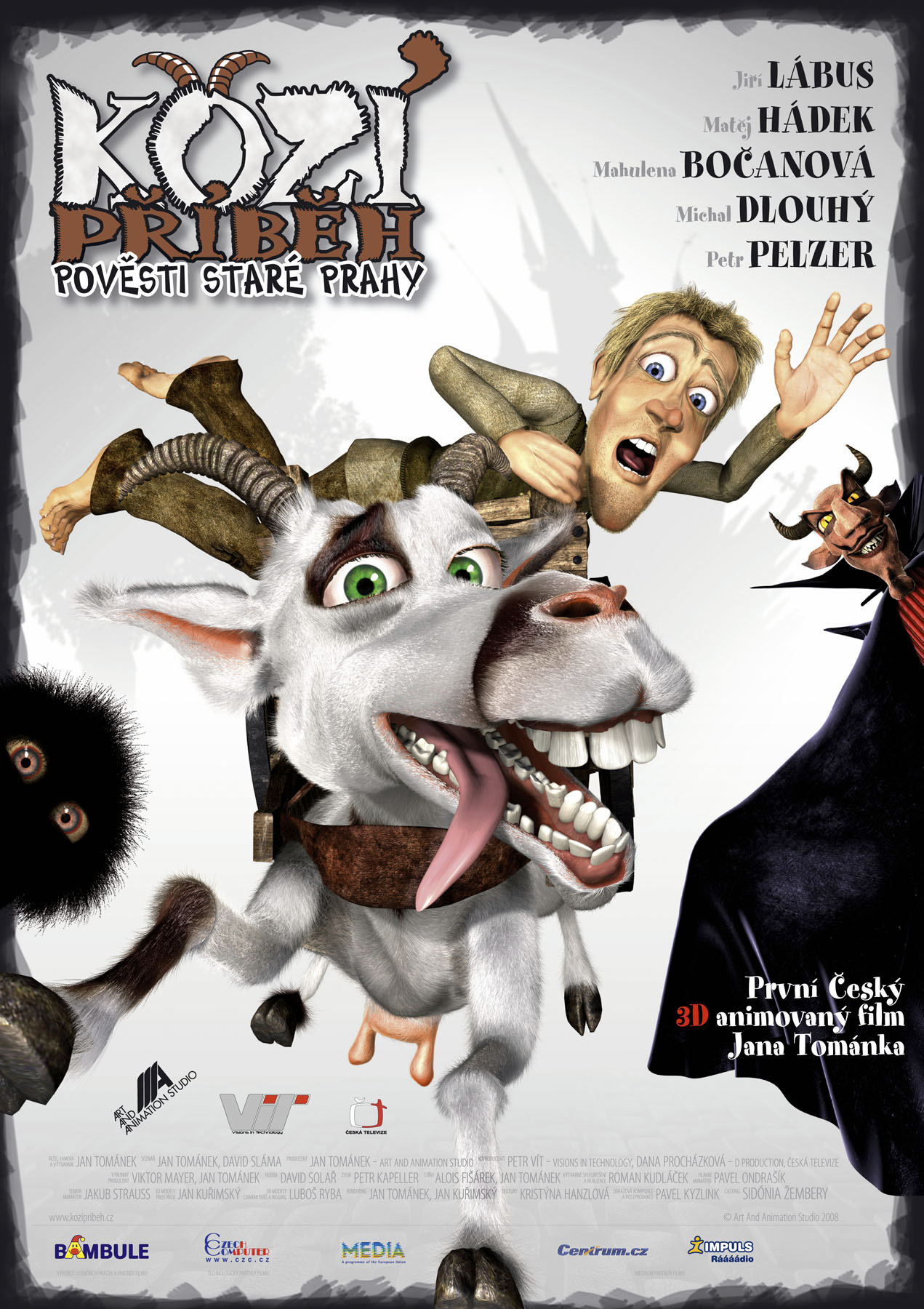
Goat story – The Old Prague Legends

- Goat Story (2008) – The Old Prague Legends – feature film, director, artist
- Goat Story with Cheese (2012) – feature film, director, artist
- Untitled Goat Story sequel (TBA) – feature film, director, artist

=== Shorts ===
- 1993 Balabanci – 8-minute bedtime stories
- 1997 Poslední večeře Páně – 3-minute short film
- 1997 Perpetuum mobile – 5-minute short film
- 1999 Kapesníček – 6-minute short film
- 1999 Ze života sklenic – 3-minute 3D animation
- 1999 Vlastně nikam... – 20-minute short film
- 2000 Svět (The World) – 3-minute 3D animation
- 2001 Červená Karkulka – 5-minute short film with animation
- 2002 Žáby (The Frogs) – 4-minute 3D animation film, in the cinema distribution since 2003
- 2003 Probuzení (Wake up) – 20-minute short film

== Books ==
- Motýlí křik (2018) (The Butterfly Scream) – The conspiracy thriller from present-day Prague and the Bilderberg conference.
- Lustr pro papeže (2019) (Chandelier for the Pope) – A true story from the hell of the communist normalization camps.
- Archa knih (2021) (Ark of Books) – The Real Truth Hides Between the Lines – Dystopian Novel (Albatros Media, XYZ)
- Válka se stromy (2022) (War with trees) – A bitterly parodic parable about a contemporary world that is getting more and more out of joint. (AAA studio)
- Průvodce králičí norou (2023) (Rabbit Hole Guide) – Thirty-three easy-to-understand chapters of essential context about the times in which we live. (AAA studio)
- Začít u sebe (2025) (Start with yourself) – The sequel to The Rabbit Hole Guide - where the previous book asked questions, this one seeks answers. (AAA studio)
