= Stanislav Látal =

Stanislav Látal (7 May 1919, in Samotišky, near Olomouc – 4 August 1994, in Prague) was a Czech puppet-film maker and animator. He was among the Czech animators Jiří Trnka, Karel Zeman, Hermína Týrlová, Jiří Barta, Břetislav Pojar, and Jan Švankmajer known for their unique style.

== Films ==
- Wedding in the Coral Sea (Svatba v korálovém moři), November 3, 1944
- The Fox and the Pitcher (Liška a džbán), September 9, 1947
- Dog worries (Psí starosti) 1954
- Kuťásek and Kutilka on a journey (Kuťásek a Kutilka na pouti) April 12, 1956
- The paver Houska's imp (Plivník dlaždiče Housky 1961
- How to raise a good child (Jak si opatřit hodné dítě) 1965
- Otýlie a 1580 kaněk ("Little Otylia and the 1,580 ink blots") 1965
- Nebuďte mamuty ("Don't wake the mammoths") 1967
- Too much tenderness (Příliš mnoho něhy) 1968
- Sunday (Neděle) 1969
- Rübezahl and the shoemaker (Krakonoš a švec) July 9, 1976
- Adventures of Robinson Crusoe, a Sailor from York (Czech Dobrodružství Robinsona Crusoe, námořníka z Yorku) April 1, 1982
- The water goblin Čepeček (Vodník Čepeček) December 11–17, 1985 (TV series)
- The Good Soldier Schweik (Osudy dobrého vojáka Švejka) 1986
