= Karel Heřmánek =

Czech actor (1947–2024)

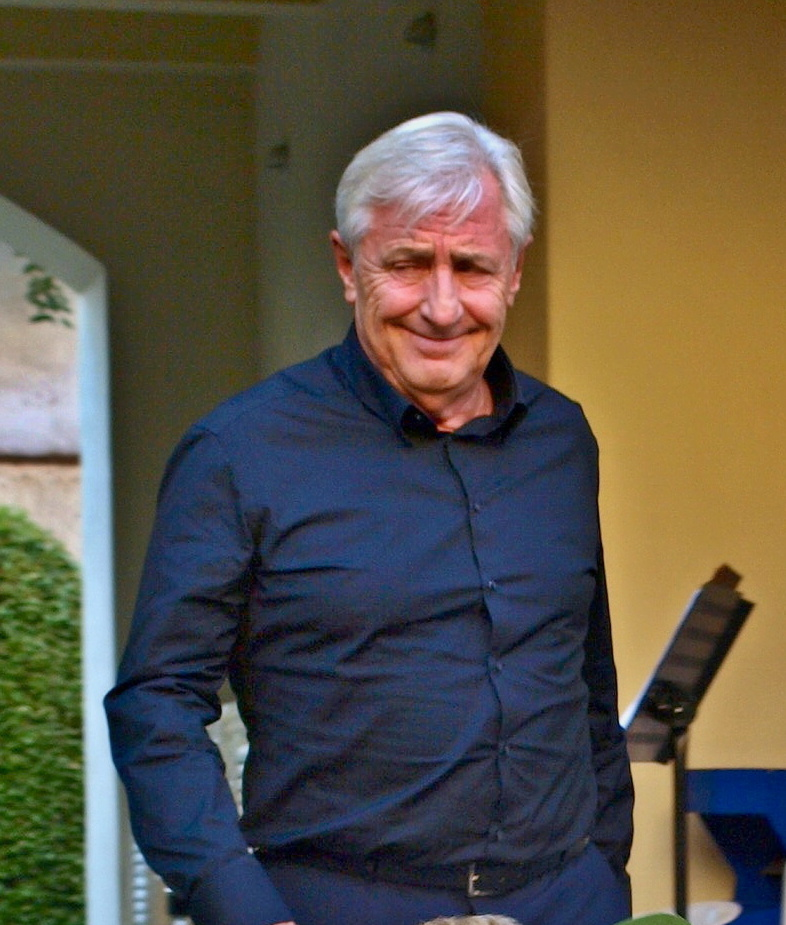
- Heřmánek in 2015
- Born: 17 October 1947; Prague, Czechoslovakia
- Died: 24 August 2024 (aged 76); Příbram, Czech Republic
- Occupation: Actor
- Years active: 1972–2024
- Spouse: Hana Heřmánková
- Children: 5

Signature
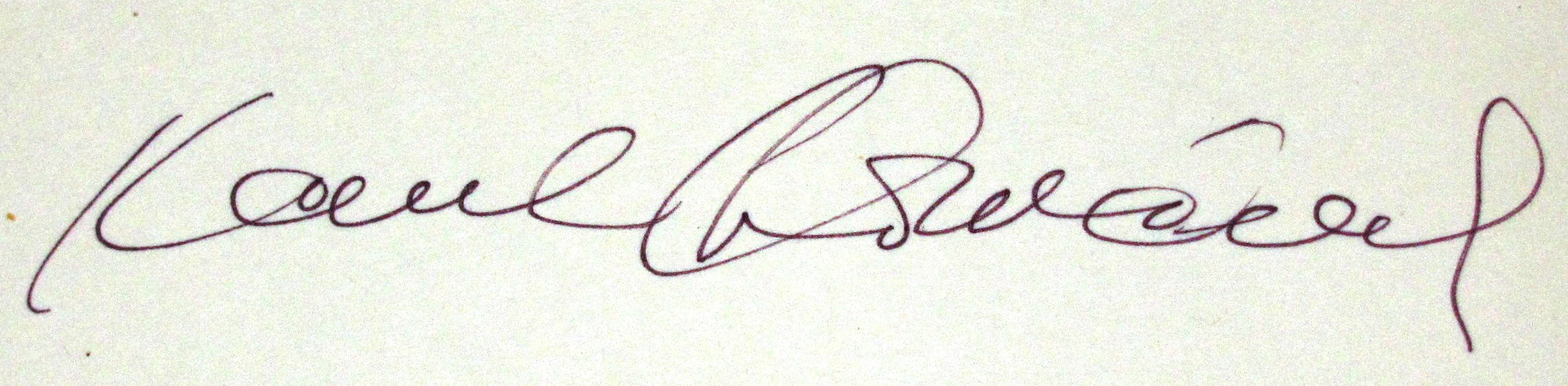

Karel Heřmánek (17 October 1947 – 24 August 2024) was a Czech actor. He appeared in more than forty films between 1976 and 2008, including the role of Lucifer in 1984's S čerty nejsou žerty (Give the Devil His Due).

Heřmánek died on 24 August 2024, at the age of 76, by suicide by a gunshot at the shooting range in Příbram. During the previous spring, he had been suffering from trigeminal neuralgia, which causes episodes of paralysis and excruciating pain, and has depression as a complication.

== Selected filmography ==
Film
Year	Title	Role	Notes
2013	Revival	Milan	
2012	Goat Story 2	Devil	Voice
2008	Goat Story	Devil	Voice
2005	Wrong Side Up	The Boss	
2000	Divided We Fall	Captain	
1996	Kolya	Musil	
1994	Thanks for Every New Morning	Orest	
1993	Stalingrad	Hauptmann Hermann Musk	
1986	Forbidden Dreams	Father	
1985	Give the Devil His Due	Lucifer	
1984	Fešák Hubert	Hubert Hrabě	
1983	Angel in a Devil's Body	Bulis	
1979	The Young Man and Moby Dick	Udo Vízner	
