= Naši furianti =

Play by Ladislav Stroupežnický

Naši furianti (in English: Our Swaggerers) is a Czech play based on a story by Ladislav Stroupežnický, performed for the first time in 1887. In 1937 a film adaptation was made, directed by Vladislav Vančura.

== Story ==
Our Swaggerers is a satirical comedy set in a small Czech village in 1869, revolving around a heated dispute over who should become the new night watchman. The seemingly simple decision becomes a power struggle between two factions in the village council. The conflict brings to light the vanity, pride, and stubbornness of various villagers, especially the so-called "swaggerers" (Furiants- in some translations) —boastful men more concerned with appearances and personal honour than the community's welfare.

At the centre of the drama is a misunderstanding involving a forged letter blackmailing the village into choosing one of the applicants that escalates tensions. Characters argue, form alliances, and attempt to outmanoeuvre one another, all while the ordinary life of the village continues around them. Stroupežnický uses witty dialogue and humorous exaggeration to critique human pettiness and parochial politics.

Despite the comedy, the play presents a realistic and affectionate portrait of Czech rural life. It ends on a note of reconciliation, showing that common sense and goodwill can prevail over pride and division. Our Swaggerers remains a cornerstone of Czech theatre for its vivid characters, timeless humour, and keen insight into social dynamics

== Productions ==
=== National Theatre, Prague, First run ===
- Director - Rudolf Tesáček
- Filip Dubský - Jiří Štěpnička
- Marie Dubská - Johanna Tesařová
- Václav - Jan Dolanský
- Petr Dubský - Alois Švehlík
- Jakub Bušek - Miroslav Donutil
- Františka Bušková - Jitka Smutná
- Veronika - Kristina Lukešová
- Matěj Šumbal - Igor Bareš, Saša Rašilov
- Marie Šumbalová - Taťjana Medvecká, Kateřina Burianová
- Pavel Kožený - Petr Pelzer
- Kašpar Šmejkal - Bronislav Poloczek, Karel Pospíšil
- Valentin Bláha - Ondřej Pavelka
- Josef Habršperk - David Prachař
- František Fiala - Jan Hartl
- Terezka - Hana Igonda Ševčíková
- Kristýna - Gabriela Pyšná
- Local Smith - Vlastimil Přáda
- Karel Kudrlička - Saša Rašilov, Jan Bidlas
- Tobiáš Nedochodil - Tomáš Stibor
- Markytka - Jaromíra Mílová
- Vojta - Milan Stehlík
- Boss of Gendarme's from Rotice Town - Petr Motloch
- Marek - Václav Postránecký
- Rozárka - Hana Militká

=== National Theatre, Prague, 2nd run ===
- Director - Miroslav Macháček
- Actors - Luděk Munzar, Josef Kemr, Jana Hlaváčová, Václav Postránecký, Eva Klenová, Taťjana Medvecká, Jiří Vala, Blažena Holišová, Ivan Luťanský, Bedřich Prokoš, Josef Somr, Naděžda Gajerová, Zuzana Šavrdová, Milan Stehlík, Petr Kostka, Klára Jerneková, Emil Konečný, Jaroslav Mareš, Miroslav Doležal, Soběslav Sejk, Zuzana Talpová, Josef Velda, Eduard Pavlíček, Pavel Vondruška

=== National Theatre, Prague, 3rd run ===
- Director - Vítězslav Vejražka
- Actors - Vítězslav Vejražka, Stanislav Neumann, Bohuš Záhorský, Jiří Dohnal, Vlasta Matulová, Jiřina Petrovická, Václav Švorc, Jarmila Krulišová, Josef Pehr, František Krahulík, Bořivoj Navrátil

=== Czech Theatre, Brno, English version translated by Anne Johnson ===
https://czechtheater.cz/shows/fast-furiants-nasi-furianti
