= Grapes (film) =

- Directed by: Tomáš Bařina
- Written by: Tomáš Bařina, Rudolf Merkner
- Produced by: Adam Dvořák
- Starring: Kryštof Hádek, Tereza Voříšková, Václav Postránecký, Miroslav Táborský
- Cinematography: Martin Preiss
- Edited by: Adam Dvořák
- Music by: Richard Krajčo
- Distributed by: Bioscop
- Release date: 27 March 2008
- Running time: 90 minutes
- Country: Czech Republic
- Language: Czech
- Budget: 23 Million CZK
- Box office: 34 Million CZK

Grapes (Czech: Bobule) is a Czech comedy film about wine in South Moravia in Czech Republic directed by Tomáš Bařina. The film was released in 2008. It was followed by two sequels 2Grapes (2Bobule) in 2009 and 3Grapes (3Bobule) in 2020.

== Cast ==
- Kryštof Hádek - Honza
- Lukáš Langmajer - Jirka
- Lubomír Lipský - Grandpa Adámek
- Tereza Voříšková - Klára
- Václav Postránecký - Michalica
- Marian Roden - František
- Miroslav Táborský - Kozderka
- Tomáš Matonoha - Kája
- Lucie Benešová - Markéta
- David Strnad - Young Honza
- Robert Jaśkow - Mácha
- Ctirad Götz - Congressman Bouček
- Jiří Bábek - Prague policeman
- Kamil Švejda - Prague policeman
- Martin Sitta - Jozífek
