= Jana Šulcová =

Czech actress (1947–2023)

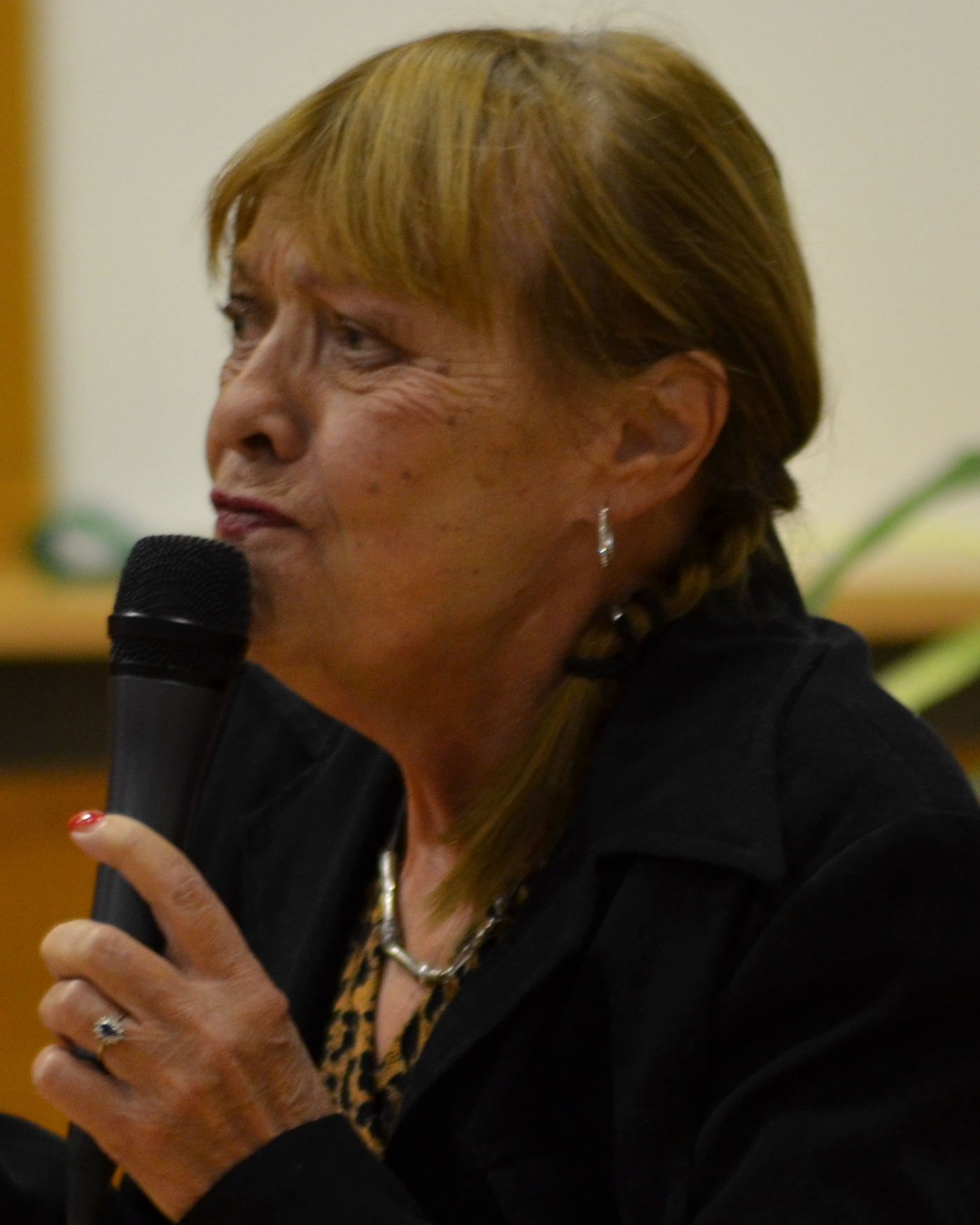
- Šulcová in 2015
- Born: 12 February 1947; Prague, Czechoslovakia
- Died: 28 July 2023 (aged 76); Prague, Czech Republic
- Occupation(s): Stage, film and television actress
- Spouse: Oldřich Vízner (div. 1988)

Jana Šulcová (12 February 1947 – 28 July 2023) was a Czech actress.

== Early life and career ==
Jana Šulcová was born in Prague on 12 February 1947. She studied acting at the Academy of Performing Arts in Prague. Following her graduation in 1969 she became an actress of the Prague City Theaters, where she remained until her retirement in 1992.

Šulcová debuted with a small role in the 1968 drama The Cremator. She became widely known by starring in the 1975 TV series Once There Was a House. Her biggest role was in the 1982 family comedy I Enjoy the World with You. After her retirement in 1992, she kept occasionally appearing in movies (The Snake Brothers) and television shows suchs as Horákovi, Vyprávěj and Doktor Martin.

== Personal life and death ==
Šulcová was married to the actor Oldřich Vízner. They had two daughters and divorced in 1988.

Jana Šulcová died in Prague on 28 July 2023, at the age of 76.
