= Sestřičky (TV series) =

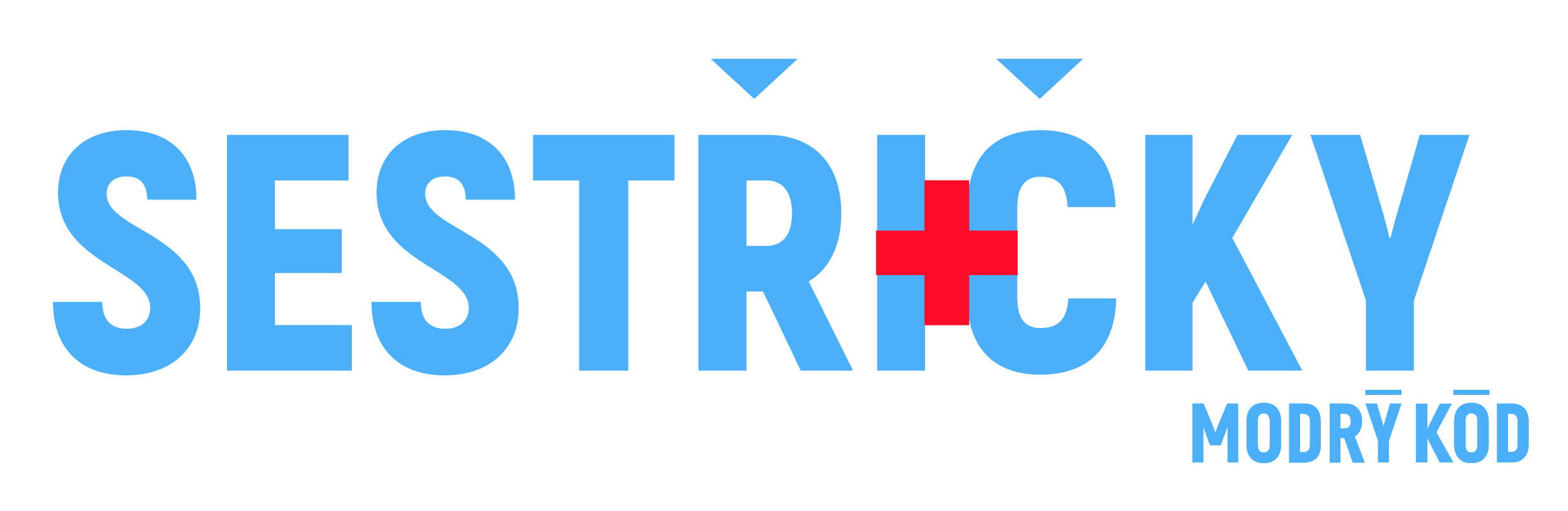
- Genre: Action; Drama; Comedy; Romantic
- Starring: Sabina Laurinová, Natálie Halouzková, Jan Nedbal, Adéla Gondíková, Saša Rašilov, Marek Němec
- Country of origin: Czech Republic
- Original language: Czech
- No. of seasons: 1
- No. of episodes: 78

Production
- Running time: 55-66 minutes

Sestřičky (English: 'Nurses'), originally produced under the title Sestřičky Modrý kód (English: 'Nurses Blue Code') is a Czech medical television series from Prima televize. It loosely follows the Modrý kód ('Blue Code') series. The plot of the series focuses on the nurses in the emergency department. It stars Sabina Laurinová, Natálie Halouzková, Jan Nedbal, Adéla Gondíková, Saša Rašilov, Marek Němec and others. The first episode aired on 29 August 2020.

It was followed by 1. mise.

== Cast ==
=== Nurses ===
- Sabina Laurinová as Marie "Mery" Tomášková (née Černá)
- Adéla Gondíková as Michaela "Míša" Kratochvílová
- Natálie Halouzková asBc. Kateřina "Katka" Kinská
- Jan Nedbal as Lukáš Hartman
- Michaela Sejnová as Libuše "Libuna/Libuška" Volejníková
- Renata Prokopová as Šárka Pokorná

=== Other hospital employees ===
- Saša Rašilov as MUDr. Michal Tomášek
- Roman Zach as MUDr. Roman Nikolajev "Rasputin" Vilkin
- Kristýna Frejová as MUDr. Ema Vlčková
- Ondřej Rychlý as MUDr. Prokop Hlinka
- David Gránský as MUDr. Matyáš "Maty" Bojan
- Sandra Nováková as MUDr. Alexandra "Saša" Růžičková
- Marek Němec as MUDr. David Hofbauer
- Igor Chmela as prim. MUDr. Viktor Žák
- Tomáš Měcháček as MUDr. Adam Brejcha
