= Dalimil Klapka =

Czech actor (1933–2022)

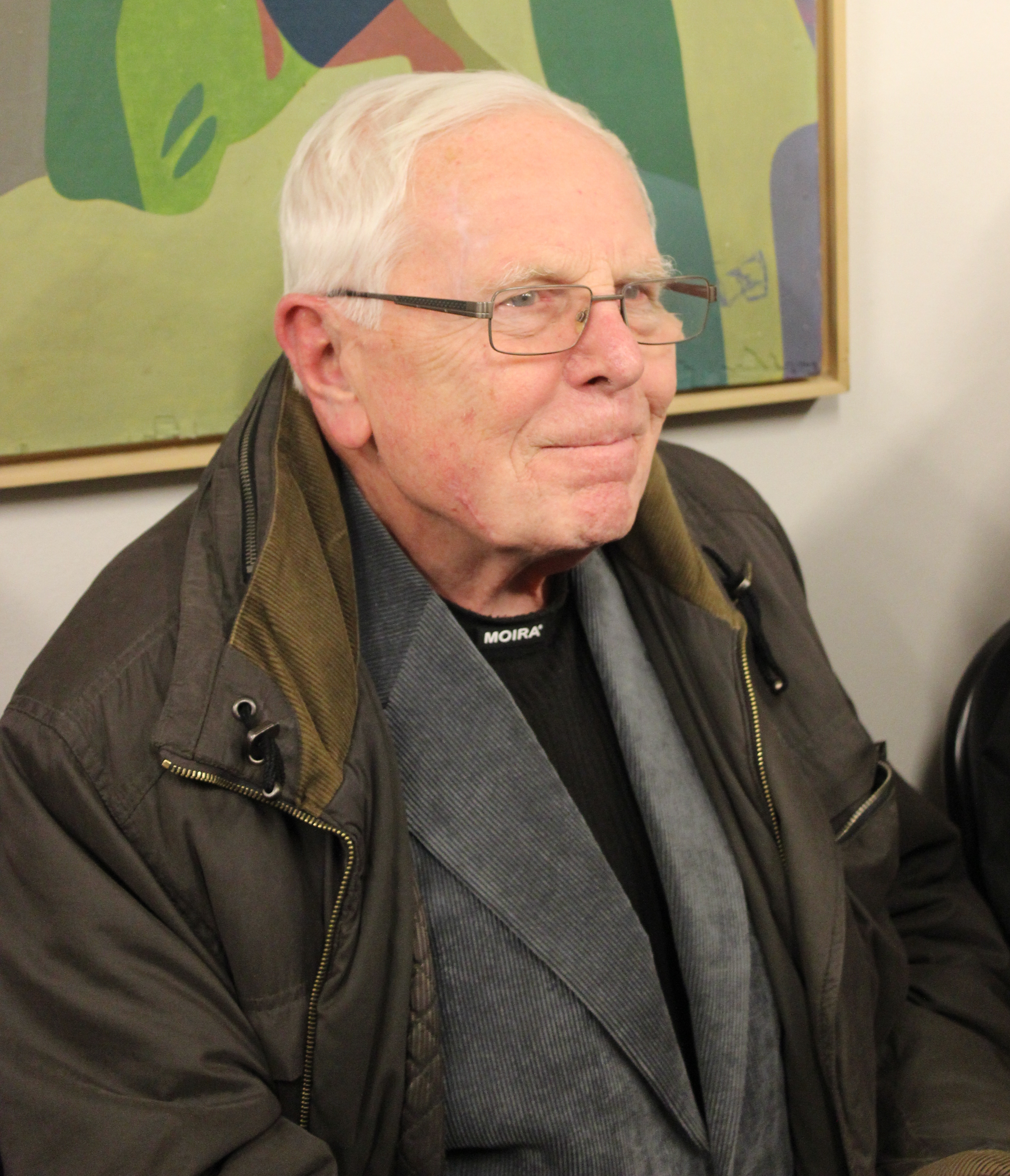
- Klapka in 2014
- Born: 22 May 1933; Prague, Czechoslovakia
- Died: 14 June 2022 (aged 89); Prague, Czech Republic
- Occupation: Actor

Dalimil Klapka (22 May 1933 – 14 June 2022) was a Czech actor and dubber.

== Life ==
He started getting involved with amateur theatre during his high school studies. In 1953 he was admitted to the Theatre School of the Academy of Performing Arts in Prague (DAMU), from which he graduated in 1957.

For 33 years he was a key actor at the Smíchov Realistic Theatre (today's Švanda Theatre in Smíchov), where he began acting even before completing his studies at DAMU. In addition to theatre and acting, he was also teaching acting at the Prague Conservatory between 1972 and 1993. He also worked at the Karlín Musical Theatre, the Old Town Theatre, the Dlouhá Theatre, the Drama Club and since April 2005 he has worked at the Fidlovačka Theatre. Among other things, he has also worked with Czech Radio and Czech Television.

In addition to acting, Dalimil Klapka was in great demand as a foreign film dubber. For example, he lent his voice to the American actor Peter Falk in the role of Lieutenant Columbo in the well-known television series Columbo or to Grampa Simpson and Principal Skinner, characters from the popular American animated series The Simpsons.

He lived with his wife Stanka Klapková in Smíchov, had two sons and three adult grandchildren.

== Later life and death ==
In the last years of his life, he struggled with cancer. He died on 14 June 2022 in the Motol Hospital.

== Theatre roles, selection ==
- 1984 Grigori Gorin: The Last Death of Jonathan Swift, Judge Bigs, Realistic Theatre, directed by Miroslav Krobot j. h.
- 1985 Vasily Shukshin: Lines on the Palm of the Hand, Timofei Khudakov, clerk, Realistic Theatre, directed by Miroslav Krobot

== Filmography, selection ==
- 1980 Okres na severu
- 1981 Ta chvíle, ten okamžik
- 1984 Sanitka
- 1987 Panoptikum města pražského
- 1994 Saturnin
- 2003 Četnické humoresky (episode 26: Slavnost)
- 2008 Goat Story (Kozí příběh – pověsti staré Prahy)
- 2012 Goat Story 2 (Kozí příběh se sýrem)

== Dubbing roles, selection ==
- 1970 Columbo – Lieutenant Columbo
- 1989 The Simpsons – Abe Simpson, Seymour Skinner
- 1992 Star Wars: Episode V – The Empire Strikes Back – Yoda
- 2002 Mafia: The City of Lost Heaven – Frank Colletti
- 2007 The Simpsons Movie – Abe Simpson, Seymour Skinner
- 2009 Futurama – Professor Farnsworth
- 2010 Mafia II – Leo Galante
- 2020 Mafia: Definitive Edition – Frank Colletti
