= Václav Postránecký =

Czech actor and dubber (1943–2019)

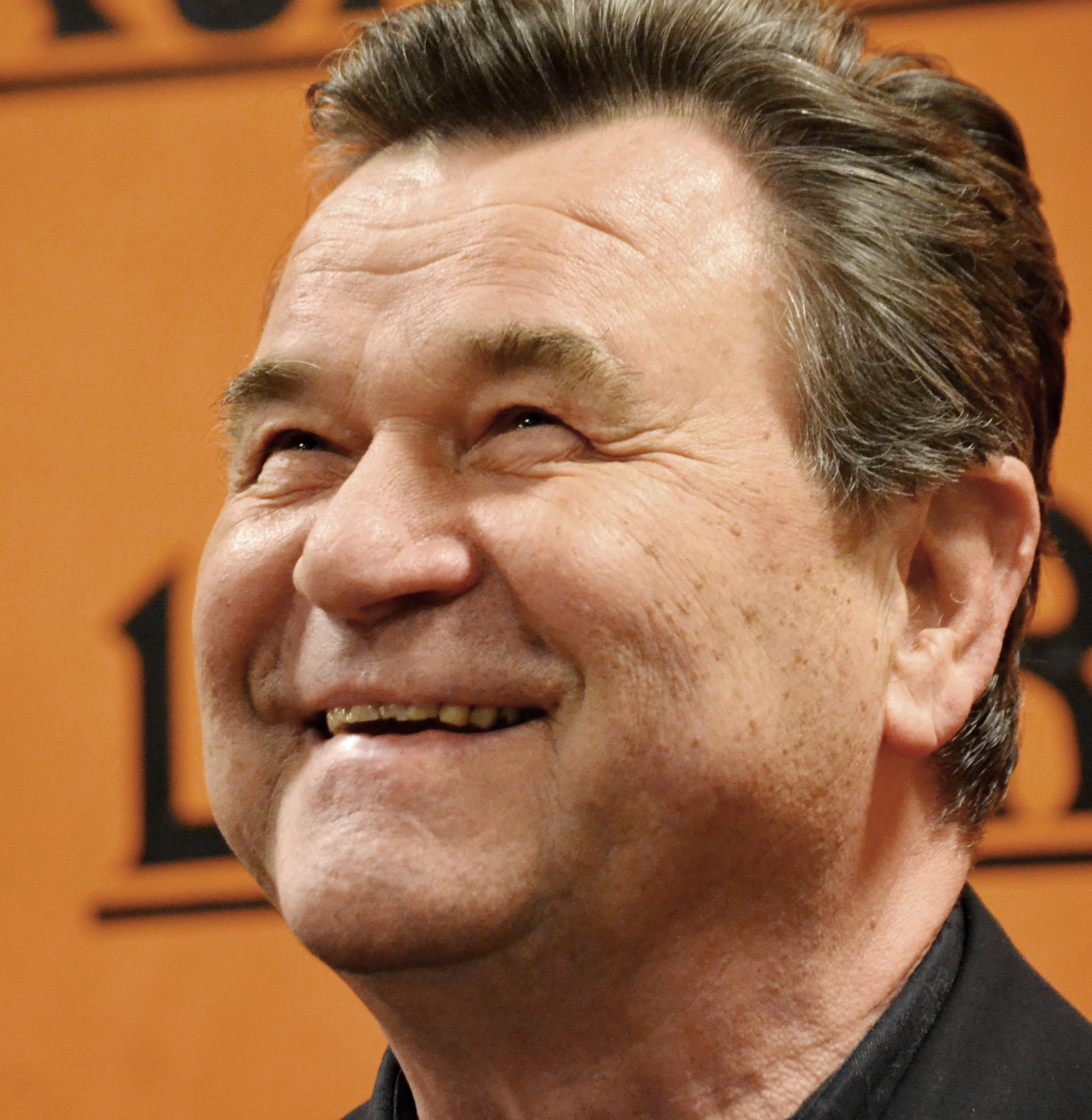
- Václav Postránecký in 2013
- Born: 8 September 1943; Prague, Protectorate of Bohemia and Moravia
- Died: 7 May 2019 (aged 75); Prague, Czech Republic
- Occupation(s): Actor, director, dubber
- Years active: 1956–2019

Václav Postránecký (8 September 1943 – 7 May 2019) was a Czech actor, director, theater teacher and dubber.

== Selected filmography ==
=== Film ===
- At the Sign of the Reine Pédauque (1967)
- I Enjoy the World with You (1982)
- Černí baroni (1992)
- Ro(c)k podvraťáků (2006)
- Grapes (2008)
- You Kiss like a God (2009)
- 2Bobule (2009)
- Bajkeři (2017)

=== Television ===
- Byl jednou jeden dům (1974)
- The Youngest of the Hamr Family (1975)
- Létající Čestmír (1983)
- Zlá krev (1986)
- O Kubovi a Stázině (1988)
- Cirkus Humberto (1988)
- Bylo nás pět (1994)
- Doktoři z Počátků (2014)
- Vinaři (2015)
- Krejzovi (2018)

=== Play ===
- Lucerna (2008)
- The Weir (2000)
- Naši furianti

=== Dubbing ===
- Adventures of Robinson Crusoe, a Sailor from York (1982)
