= Horákovi =

- Genre: comedy
- Directed by: Biser Arichtev, Tomáš Krejčí
- Starring: Igor Bareš, Lucie Benešová
- Country of origin: Czech Republic
- Original language: Czech
- No. of seasons: 2
- No. of episodes: 39

Production
- Executive producer: Petr Šizling
- Producer: Filip Bobiňski
- Production company: Dramedy Productions

Original release
- Network: ČT1
- Release: April 6, 2006 – August 29, 2007

Horákovi (Horáks) is a Czech television series filmed by Dramedy Productions for Czech Television. It is based on Spanish series Los Serrano. The series began broadcasting on Wednesday, September 6, 2006, on Czech Television and has 39 episodes. Audience follows the everyday joys and worries of a modern family. These are closed stories, but they connect the fates and family relationships of the main characters. The SerialZone website states that Season 1 ends after Episode 22 and season 2 begins with Episode 23. The series has become popular for a long time, especially among families and children, and is regularly reprised.

== Cast and characters ==
- Jan Horák (Igor Bareš) – after the death of his wife Marta, he is reunited with his former love Lucia and they get married. He tries to be the best father in the world to Licie's children. Together with his brother, he works in the family pub. In addition to his brother Standa, he also has a brother Matěj, whom he thinks is a millionaire.
- Lucie Krátká Horáková (Lucie Benešová) – divorced, she has two daughters with her ex-husband, Eva and Tereza, whom she takes care of together with her second husband, Jan. She is a teacher at the grammar school where every child from her new and old family goes.
- Eva Krátká (Hana Vagnerová) – Lucie's older daughter, very smart and trying to do well in school. The exact opposite of his half-brother Tomáš, with whom he falls in love. She has had a few acquaintances and hopes that she and Tomáš will be able to be together. She goes to grammar school in the same class as Tomáš, and her mother also teaches here.
- Tereza Krátká (Mariana Prachařová) – Lucie's younger daughter, very energetic, impulsive, sometimes her nose is turned up. But still she is very smart and interested in studying. He is at war with his half-brother Ondra, with whom he goes to class at the gymnasium. In addition, she is growing into a young lady and new emotions such as love will enter her life.
- Tomáš Horák (Jakub Chromeček) – Jan's eldest son goes to grammar school, where he does not do as well as his half-sister Eva, with whom he goes to class. His best friend is Patrik, who happens to be the son of their teacher Sonia. He is interested in football and also in girls, which changes his relationship with Eva, who at first cannot admit it and wants to beat him with a relationship with the young Czech Markéta. He can play the guitar and dreams of becoming a famous musician.
- Ondra Horák (Jan Komínek) – Jan's middle son, he enjoys pranks and not only the house is full of them, but the school is also full of them. He doesn't do very well at school, the only things he's very good at are sports and technology. Otherwise, he makes fun of everything. Together with a group of boys, he makes a mess and tries to win over his sister Teresa. It is a pretty flower and its arch enemy is the toilet brush.
- Jakub Horák (Marek Zeman) – Jan's youngest son, Benjamin of the entire Horák family. He is nicknamed Sausage, after his father's shop. He does most of the work at home, which he doesn't enjoy, but he likes his dad and tries to make him happy. He considers Lucia to be a good mother, he likes her, as well as his brothers and sisters.
- Patrik Procházka (Jakub Prachař) – Tomáš' best friend, son of Eda and Soňa, who is only interested in love, sex and erotica. The love of his life is Eva, with whom he scored several times, but immediately burned out. Like Tomáš, he plays football and always tries to come up with some good advice, which he thinks is great, but seems like total nonsense to others.
- Zdeňka Kadlecová (Jana Šulcová) – Lucie's mother, Eva and Tereza's grandmother, who often appears in the Horák household. He keeps a firm hand over his daughter and guides her to order. However, this does not mean that the flawless grandmother does not sometimes get it wrong.
- Soňa Procházková (Nela Boudová) – strict teacher, Lucie's best friend and Eda's wife. She fights with the student Ondra and his gang, she is constantly on their heels, but sometimes her kind nature shows. But only sometimes.
- Eda Procházka (Ctirad Götz) – a car mechanic, Sona's husband and Patrik's father. He is often seen in Jan and Standa's pub. He often tries to prove to his wife that he is still the man she married.
- Stanislav Horák (Jan Hraběta) – Jan's brother, with whom he runs the pub. The whole time he was hiding his brother Matěj from Jan, because he didn't want the youngest brother to find out that Matěj was a fraud. He's been in a couple of relationships, but he's still single and happy. In episode 37, he learns that he has a daughter.
- Anežka Králová (Dana Batulková) – religion teacher (in one of the episodes she dates Standa)
- Kristýna (Kateřina Šildová) – Eva's best friend (since episode 25)
- Markéta (Jana Bernášková) – a Czech language teacher, with whom Tomáš falls in love,. She later runs away not only from him, but also from life.
- Štěpán (Ondřej Česák) – Ondra's friend.
- Vít (Marek Gallo) – Ondra's friend
- David (Daniel Rous) – school headmaster and Sona's brother, who used to be in love with Lucie.
- Filip Černík (Michal Zelenka) – the waiter in the pub on whom Standa vents her anger.
- Matěj Horák (Oldřich Navrátil) – Jan and Standa's brother, who cheats in America. He falls in love with Lucie's mother Zdena
- Miroslav Krátký (Pavel Novotný) – Lucie's ex-husband, a successful doctor, winner of several awards. Lucie is ashamed of him in front of her current husband Jan, but their two daughters look up to him.

== Links ==
- Official website
- IMDB
