= You Kiss like a God =

2009 Czech comedy film

You Kiss Like God
- Czech: Líbáš jako Bůh
- Directed by: Marie Poledňáková
- Written by: Marie Poledňáková
- Produced by: Jan Bradáč; Svatka Peschková
- Starring: Kamila Magálová; Oldřich Kaiser; Eva Holubová; Jiří Bartoška; Milan Šteindler; Martha Issová; Jaroslava Adamová; Nela Boudová; Roman Vojtek; Václav Postránecký; Arnošt Lustig
- Edited by: Adam Dvořák
- Music by: Petr Malásek
- Distributed by: Falcon
- Release date: 12 February 2009
- Running time: 110 mins.
- Country: Czech Republic
- Language: Czech
- Budget: Kč35 million
- Box office: Kč90 million

You Kiss Like a God (Czech: Líbáš jako Bůh) is a 2009 Czech comedy film directed by Marie Poledňáková. Upon its release, it became the most watched film in Czech theatres.

== Plot ==
Helena Altmanová (Kamila Magálová), a high school teacher, lives in an apartment with her ex-husband Karel (Jiří Bartoška), a successful writer, even after being divorced. Their extended family lives with them as well, including their son Adam (Roman Vojtek), his wife Bela (Martha Issová), their sons Bastík (Filip Antonio) and Max, Helen's sister Kristýna (Nela Boudová), a widow with three children, and the matriarch of the family, Alžběta (Jaroslava Adamová), still vital even in her 70s. Helena has little time left for her own life, what with everything going on around her. One day, she meets a man named František (Oldřich Kaiser), a doctor with whom she quickly falls in love. František, however, is "kinda married", and his wife Bohunka (Eva Holubová) does not share his ideas about an open relationship. A series of humorous events transpires as the story progresses.

== Cast and characters ==
- Kamila Magálová as Helena
- Jiří Bartoška as Karel
- Eva Holubová as Bohunka
- Oldřich Kaiser as František
- Nela Boudová as Kristýna
- Roman Vojtek as Adam
- Martha Issová as Bela
- Jaroslava Adamová as Alžběta
- Arnošt Lustig as Arnošt
- Filip Antonio as Bastík
