= Roman Vojtek =

Czech actor, presenter, and singer (born 1972)

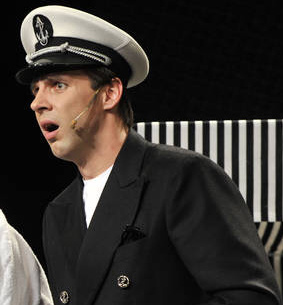
- Roman Vojtek
- Born: 14 April 1972 (age 53); Vsetín, Czechoslovakia
- Occupations: Actor, singer
- Years active: 1996–present
- Spouse: Petra Vojtková

Roman Vojtek (born 14 April 1972) is a Czech actor, television presenter, and singer.

== Life and career ==
=== Early life and education ===
Vojtek, born in Vsetín in the former Czechoslovakia, had to take care of himself from the age of fourteen due to the death of his parents. While studying musical theatre at JAMU in Brno, he worked as an actor at Brno City Theatre. After graduating, he went to Prague, where got a job at Musical Theatre Karlín.

=== Acting and singing work ===
Vojtek has continued to perform in theatre, most recently at Dům U Hybernů. He has also appeared in a number of television productions and films. In 2006, he took part in the first installment of the reality dance show StarDance. In 2016, he participated in the reality show Tvoje tvář má známý hlas, the Czech version of Your Face Sounds Familiar.

=== Personal life ===
In 2009, he married longtime girlfriend Tereza Janoušová, with whom he has two children: Edia (born 2009) and Benedikt (born 2015). He is currently married to actress and singer Petra Vojtková, with whom he has a son, Nathaniel (born 2020).

== Selected filmography ==
=== Film ===
List of film appearances, with year, title, and role shown
Year	Title	Role	Notes
1998	Dvojrole	Tonda	
2007	Svatba na bitevním poli	Father Prokop	
2008	Peklo s princeznou	Smolda	
2008	You Kiss like a God	Adam	
2012	Líbáš jako ďábel	Adam	
2016	Taxi 121	Football manager	
2019	Můj svět	Doctor	

=== Television ===
List of television appearances, with year, title, and role shown
Year	Title	Role	Notes
2009	Trapasy	Dr. Karel Vágner	2 episodes
2009–13	Vyprávěj	Karel Dvořák	115 episodes
2007–15	Ulice	Hynek Urban	166 episodes
2015–16	Všechny moje lásky	Lukás Matejka	28 episodes
2017	Modrý kód	Dr. Daniel Boruvka	14 episodes
2018	Kadernictví	Adam	2 episodes
2018–19	Krejzovi	Matěj Ruppert	2 episodes
