= Samotišky =

- Municipality
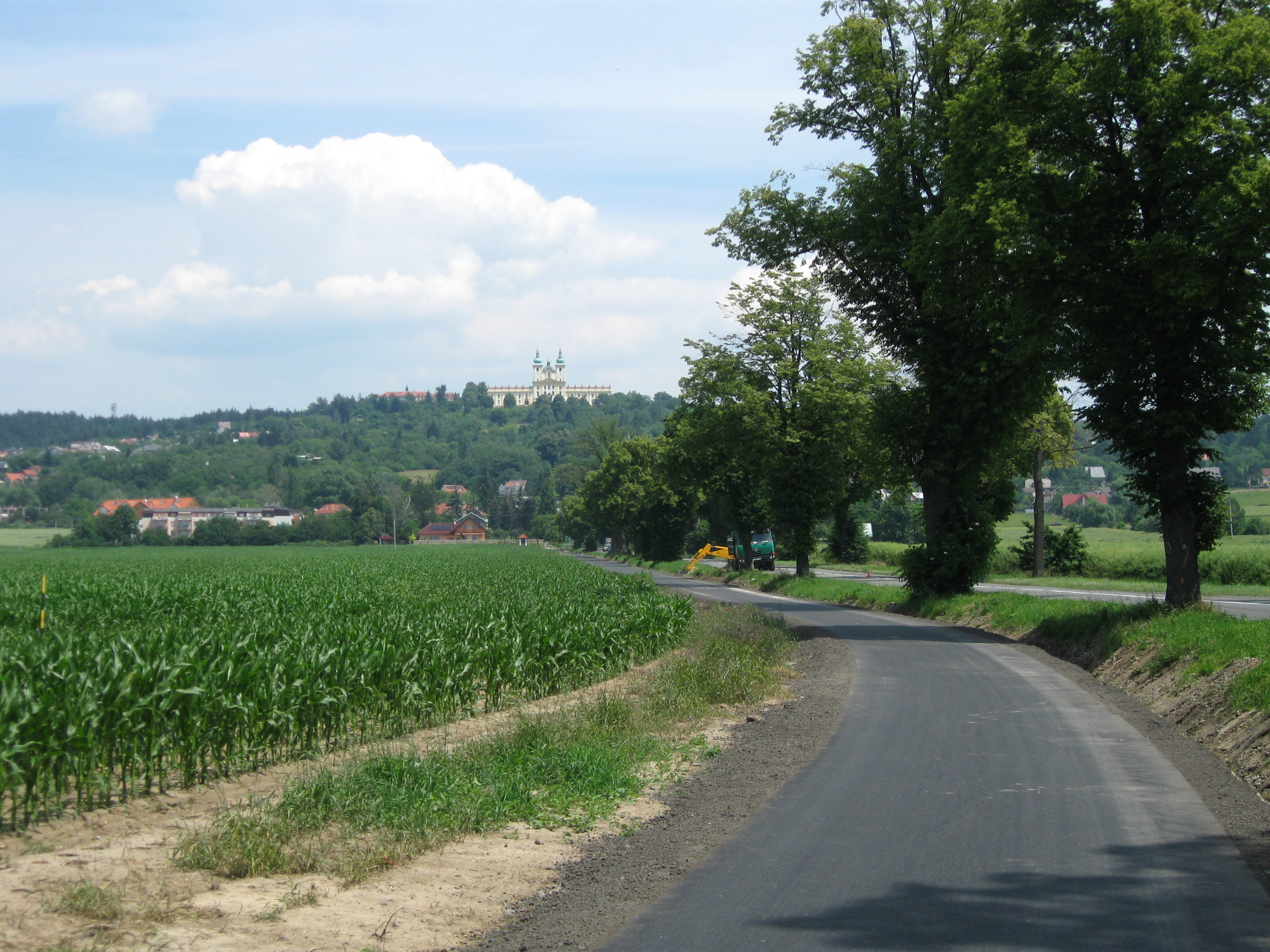
- Kopecká street

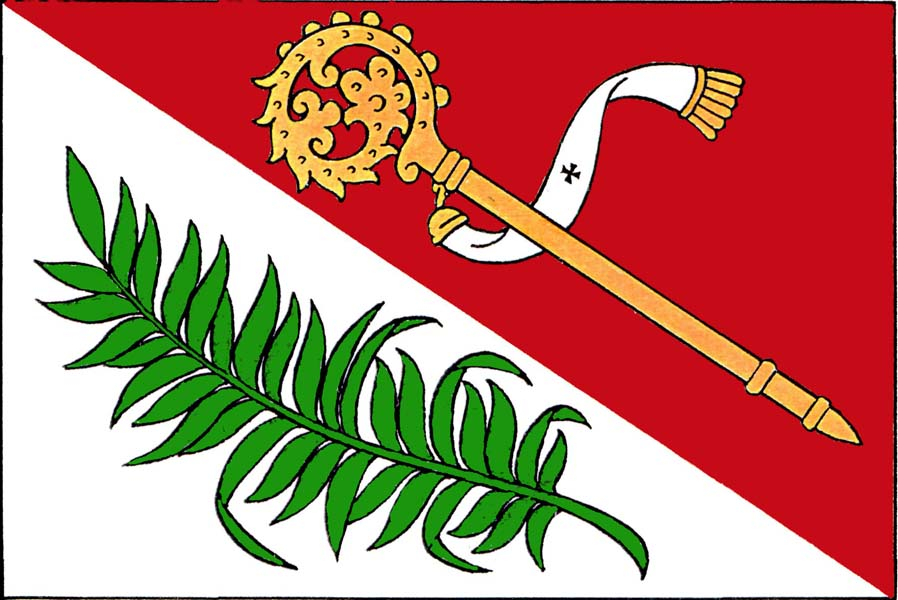
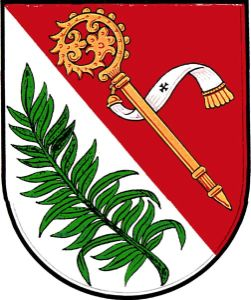
- Flag Coat of arms

- Location in the Czech Republic
- Coordinates: 49°37′50″N 17°19′41″E
- Country: Czech Republic
- Region: Olomouc
- District: Olomouc
- First mentioned: 1141

Area
  - Total: 1.90 km^{2} (0.73 sq mi)
- Elevation: 267 m (876 ft)

Population (2026-01-01)
  - Total: 1,318
  - Density: 694/km^{2} (1,800/sq mi)
- Time zone: UTC+1 (CET)
  - Summer (DST): UTC+2 (CEST)
- Postal code: 779 00
- Website: www.samotisky.cz

Samotišky is a municipality and village in Olomouc District in the Olomouc Region of the Czech Republic. It has about 1,300 inhabitants.

Samotišky lies approximately 7 kilometres (4 mi) north-east of Olomouc and 215 km (134 mi) east of Prague.

== Demographics ==
Historical population
Year	Pop.	±%
1869	726	—
1880	692	−4.7%
1890	753	+8.8%
1900	815	+8.2%
1910	851	+4.4%
1921	897	+5.4%
1930	1,070	+19.3%
1950	954	−10.8%
1961	968	+1.5%
1970	898	−7.2%
1980	859	−4.3%
1991	917	+6.8%
2001	1,034	+12.8%
2011	1,272	+23.0%
2021	1,343	+5.6%
Source: Censuses

== Notable people ==
- Stanislav Látal (1919–1994), puppeteer, animator and film director
