= Július Satinský =

Slovak actor, singer, and writer (1941–2002)

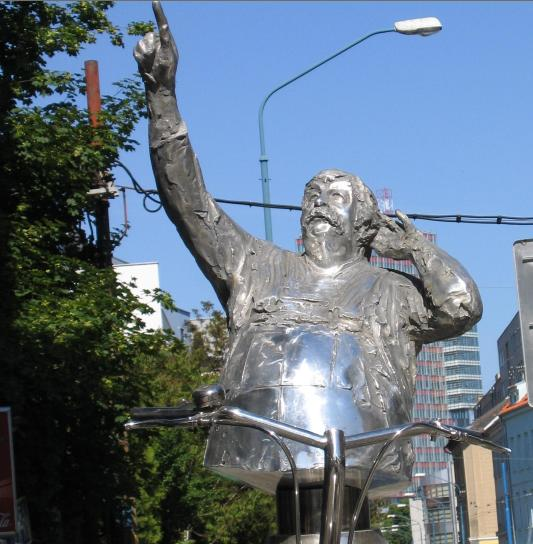
- Monument of Július Satinský in Bratislava
- Born: 20 August 1941; Bratislava, Slovakia
- Died: 29 December 2002 (aged 61); Bratislava, Slovakia
- Occupations: Actor, comedian, singer, showman, writer
- Years active: 1961–2002

Július Satinský (20 August 1941 – 29 December 2002) was a Slovak actor, comedian, singer, showman and writer. He is mostly remembered in Slovakia as a member of the legendary comedian duo Milan Lasica - Július Satinský, however his scope of interest was wide. He died on 29 December 2002 due to colon cancer.

Asteroid 15946 Satinský is named after him.

== Life ==
Július Satinský was born in Bratislava. He studied drama theory at the Academy of Performing Arts in Bratislava (VŠMU). He started his acting career alongside Milan Lasica in 1959, with whom he formed a comic duo. They performed in the Divadlo na Korze theatre (presently Astorka Korzo 90´) until the late 1960s.

After 1968 (see Prague Spring, Normalization (Czechoslovakia)), the duo was partly banned from working in the Slovak part of Czechoslovakia and performed for two years in a cabaret in the Czech city of Brno. Between 1972 and 1978, Satinský was a member of the musical ensemble of the Nová scéna theatre and between 1978 and 1980 he was a member of the drama company of this theatre and of the Korzo 90 theatre in Bratislava.

When they were allowed to appear on stage again in 1982, they moved to the newly established Štúdio S theatre, of which Lasica was director.

Satinský was not only known as an actor and comedian but also as a radio and TV host, a lecturer who travelled around Slovakia to discuss questions about democracy and civil society and as an author of memoirs about his childhood and student years in Bratislava as well as of feuilletons. Along with Milan Lasica he sang on several music albums, the most successful being Bolo nás jedenásť (There used to be eleven of us) with music by Jaroslav Filip.

On 2 January 2002, he received the state award Pribina Cross of the First Class for his lifetime contribution to Slovak art and support for civil society.

== Major works ==
Sketches:

- Večery pre dvoch (Evenings for two)
- Soirée
- Ktosi je za dverami (Somebody is behind the door)

Films:

- S tebou mě baví svět [a film in Czech] (I enjoy the world with you)
- Vesničko má středisková [a film in Czech] (My Sweet Little Village)
- Utekajme, už ide [a film in Slovak] (Let's run, he is coming)

Humorous feuilletons:

- Moji milí Slováci (My dear Slovaks, 1992)

Dramatic works:

- Náš priateľ René [co-author Milan Lasica] (Our friend René)
- Deň Radosti [co-author Milan Lasica] (A Day of fun)

Prose:

- Nečakanie na Godota [co-author Milan Lasica] (Not waiting for Godot)
- Čučoriedkáreň (Blueberries factory)
- Rozprávky Uja Klobásu (Stories of Mr. Sausage)

== See also ==
- The 100 Greatest Slovak Albums of All Time
