= I Enjoy the World with You =

1982 Czechoslovak family comedy film

- Czech: S tebou mě baví svět
- Directed by: Marie Poledňáková
- Screenplay by: Marie Poledňáková
- Story by: Marie Poledňáková
- Produced by: Jan Balzer
- Starring: Július Satinský; Václav Postránecký; Jana Šulcová; Eliška Balzerová; Zdena Studenková; Pavel Nový; Květa Fialová; Jan Faltýnek
- Cinematography: Petr Polák
- Edited by: Miroslav Hájek
- Music by: Václav Zahradník
- Production company: Barrandov Studios
- Release date: 1982
- Running time: 82 min.
- Country: Czechoslovakia
- Language: Czech
- Budget: 4,300,000 KČs
- Box office: 17,091,070 KČs

I Enjoy the World with You (Czech: S tebou mě baví svět) is a 1982 Czechoslovak family comedy directed by Marie Poledňáková. The movie was elected as the best Czech comedy ever made.

== Plot ==
Every year, three middle-aged friends, sound engineer Pepa, doctor Albert, and music director Michal, plan to spend their vacation at Albert's cottage in the Beskids. They always go there without their wives but this year, the wives decide to make them change their minds. They promise to let their husbands go without them under one condition - they will take all their children instead. The wives are sure their husbands will never accept, but the men decide to take the kids and do their best to exhaust them during the day so that they have some time for themselves in the evening. Nothing goes according to plan, however.

The cottage, set in a picturesque mountain environment without electricity, with outdoor latrines for toilets and the need to chop wood for cooking, presents unique challenges to the children as well as many opportunities for humorous situations. The fathers come up with various dangerous games and contests in order to keep their kids occupied. The three wives surprise their husbands by visiting unexpectedly, and they are not pleased with the scene which greets them. They then proceed to get back at their husbands for their irresponsible behaviour.

== Cast and characters ==
- Július Satinský as Albert Horák
- Jana Šulcová as Kateřina Horáková
- Václav Postránecký as Michal Adámek
- Eliška Balzerová as Dáša Adámková
- Pavel Nový as Pepa Bednář
- Zdena Studenková as Gábina Bednářová
- Květa Fialová as grandmother
- Jan Faltýnek as taxi driver
- Zuzana Gutheisová a Dášenka
- Marta Buchtíková as Kačenka
- Václav Korda as Míša
- Cyril Křupala as Pepíno
- Lukáš Pelánek as Matýsek
- Marek Dvořák as Bertík
