= Goat Story =

2008 Czech animated fantasy film

Goat Story – The Old Prague Legends
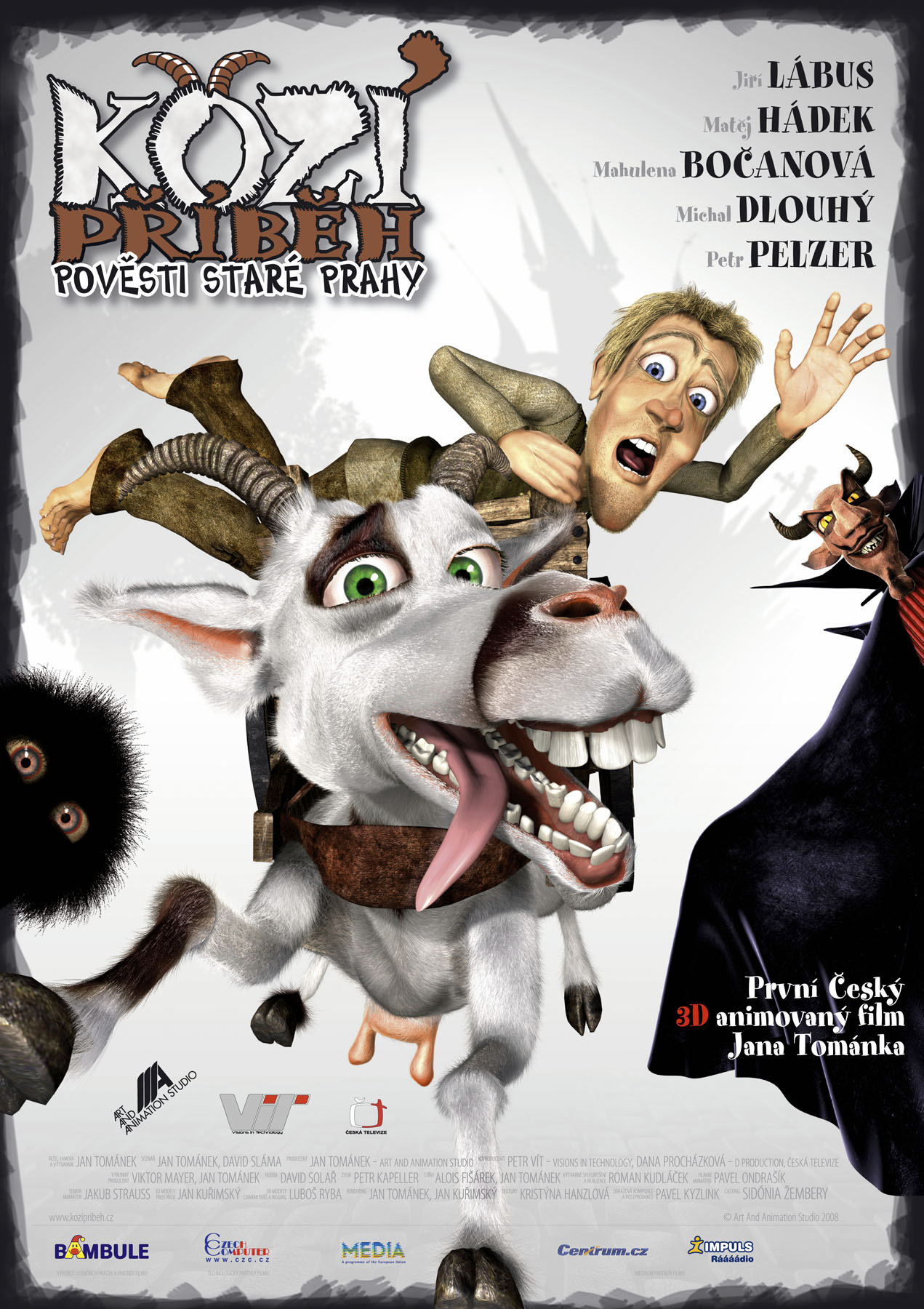
- Czech theatrical release poster
- Directed by: Jan Tománek
- Written by: Jan Tománek; David Sláma; Robin Panzer
- Story by: Jan Tománek; David Sláma
- Produced by: Viktor Mayer; Jan Tománek
- Starring: Jiří Lábus; Matěj Hádek; Mahulena Bočanová; Michal Dlouhý; Petr Pelzer; Jan Přeučil; Viktor Preiss; Miroslav Táborský; Karel Heřmánek; Petr Nárožný; Dalimil Klapka; Pavel Rímský; Ota Jirák; Filip Jevič; Justin Svoboda
- Cinematography: Jan Tománek
- Edited by: Alois Fisárek; Jan Tománek
- Music by: David Solař
- Production companies: Art And Animation studio; Visions in Technology; D production; Ceská Televize
- Distributed by: Bontonfilm
- Release date: 16 October 2008 (Czech)
- Running time: 80 minutes
- Country: Czech Republic
- Languages: Czech; English
- Budget: $1.8 million
- Box office: $1.3 million (Czech Republic)

Goat Story – The Old Prague Legends (Czech: Kozí příběh - pověsti staré Prahy) is a 2008 Czech adult animated fantasy comedy film produced and directed by Jan Tománek and written by Tománek with David Sláma. The first Czech-produced feature-length computer-animated film, it features animation by Art And Animation Studio (AAA Studio), and was released on 19 May 2010 in the United States.

The film features the voices of Jiří Lábus, Matěj Hádek, Mahulena Bočanová, Michal Dlouhý, Petr Pelzer, Jan Přeučil, Viktor Preiss, Miroslav Táborský, Karel Heřmánek, Petr Nárožný, Dalimil Klapka, Pavel Rímský, Ota Jirák, Filip Jevič and Justin Svoboda. Produced over the course of five years with a budget of less than $3 million, only about ten animators and 3D graphic designers created it.

Goat Story was released in theatres in the Czech Republic on 16 October 2008 by Bontonfilm, and it won the main prize at the 2010 Buenos Aires International Children's Film Festival, and received nominations at other film festivals. A sequel, Goat Story 2, was released in 2012.

== Plot ==
The story takes place in Prague during the reign of Charles IV, when the Charles Bridge and Prague Astronomical Clock were still undergoing construction. A villager named Jemmy arrives in the capital from the countryside with his goat. A poor student named Matthew arrives in Prague to study with Master Hanuš.

Jemmy and his goat stay in Prague to do work on the bridge. It is here that Jemmy meets Katie for the first time, and immediately falls in love with her. Katie is a city girl who supplies forged nails for the bridge's construction. Jemmy ends up causing the scaffolding on a side of the bridge to fall due to his carving of a statue of Katie from a support beam. He and his goat are banned by the workers.

In the meantime, Master Hanuš looks for sculptors and carvers for the Astronomical Clock statues. He catches a glimpse of Jemmy, and is interested with his natural woodcarving talent. Matthew, being the target of ridicule by other students because of his poverty, studies with Master Hanuš, too. He has gained his teacher's trust, and oversees the plans of the Astronomical Clock. Since Matthew has nowhere to sleep, he finds the Faust House in Prague, already abandoned at the time.

Thanks to his classmates' frequent ridicule, Matthew succumbs to the lure and picks up a grey tolar in Faust's house to pay for his classmates' drinks and fit in with his peers. However, they deceive him and destroy the plans to the Astronomical Clock while they are unguarded. The unsuspecting Matthew gives the ruined plans back to Master Hanuš. The Prague councillors discover the damaged plans, and demand punishment for Matthew. Matthew is placed in a pillory for one day. Because he does not know what he did wrong, he plans to take revenge on Master Hanuš. When Master Hanuš and Jemmy finally complete the Astronomical Clock, they get no respect or recognition.

The Chinese government asks Master Hanuš to make an Astronomical Clock in their city, too. Matthew glimpses this discussion, but meanwhile signs a contract with Satan.

Matthew writes a letter to Prague councillors explaining to them that Hanuš is a traitor. The mayor entrusts the executioner Mydlář to cut out Hanuš's eyes. Hanuš wants to take revenge for this violence, and ruins his own astronomical clock by sabotaging the gears. Jemmy, as his assistant, is commissioned to fix the astronomical clock under Katie's threat of being executed if he fails to do so in time. Jemmy fixes the astronomical clock at the last minute but arrives at the gallows too late, and Katie has been hanged already.

Jemmy is at a church praying to God to give Katie back to him. It is at that moment that Katie comes into the church. Later, it is revealed that Jemmy's goat disguised herself as Katie, and was hanged in her place. As the goat falls from the gallows, it is revealed that she had an iron tube in her throat the whole time, meaning her neck was never snapped and she survived the hanging.

== Voice cast ==
- Jiří Lábus as Goat
- Matěj Hádek / Mike Buffo (English version) as Jemmy
- Mahulena Bočanová / Jo-Anne Krupa (English version) as Katie
- Michal Dlouhý as Matthew
- Petr Pelzer as Master Hanuš
- Jan Přeučil as Purkmistr
- Viktor Preiss as Konšel
- Miroslav Táborský as Priest Ignác
- Karel Heřmánek as Devil / Leader
- Petr Nárožný as Beggar
- Dalimil Klapka as Beggar
- Pavel Rímský as Beggar
- Ota Jirák as Taverner
- Filip Jevič as Student
- Justin Svoboda as Student
- Luba Goy as Cořum (English version)

== Production ==
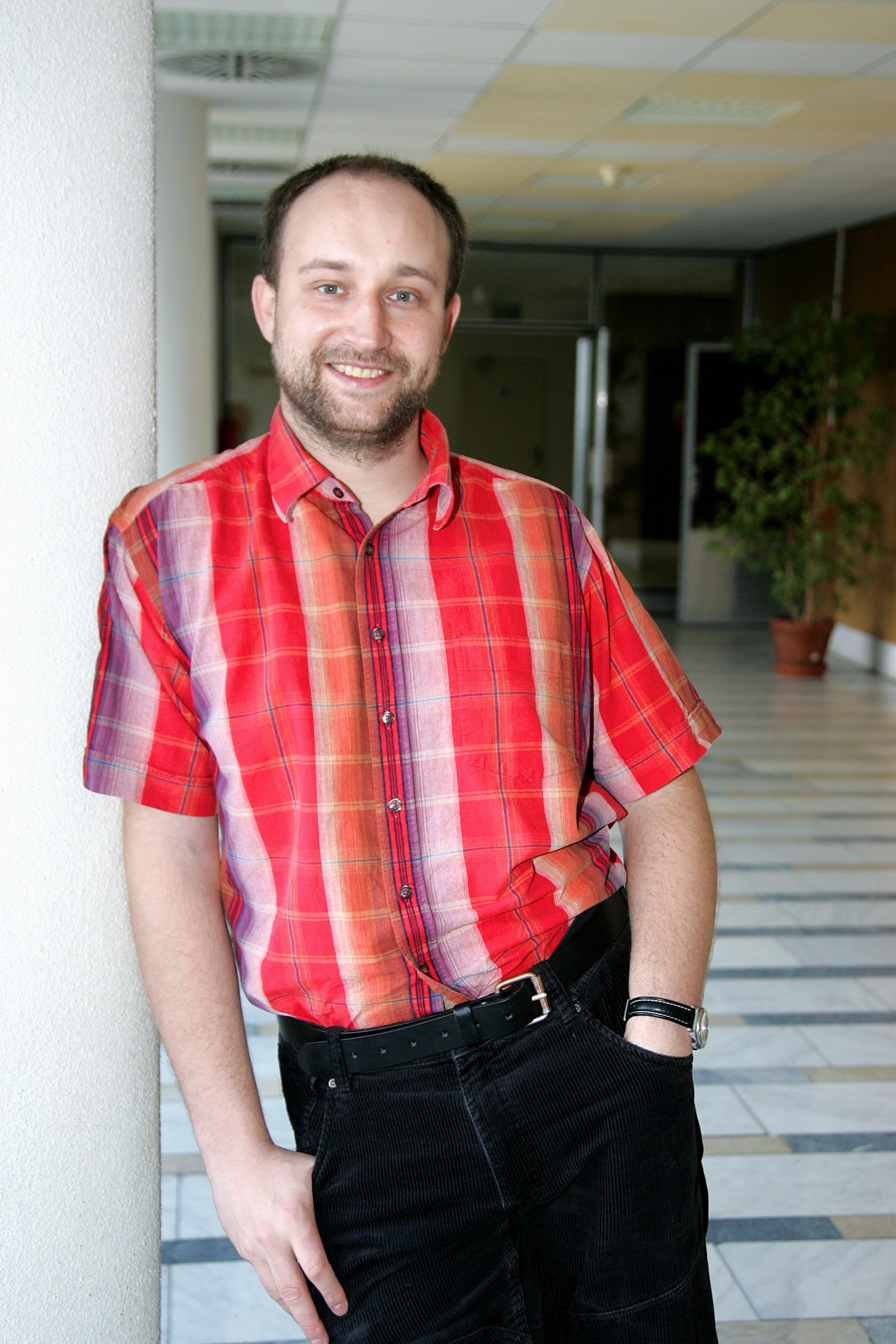
Jan Tománek is the film's director, producer, writer, and editor.

Production started in 2003 at Jan Tománek's family Art And Animation studio. Jan Tománek along with David Sláma co-wrote the script for the film. The film budget was just under $3 million, receiving funding from the European Union MEDIA development program, AAA Studio, and various co-producers.

David Solař wrote the music for the film. Development, animation, lighting, color and storyboarding of the film was done in Prague, Czech Republic. The Czech distributor was Bontonfilm.

Mike Buffo and Jo-Anne Krupa joined the cast to supply the voices Jemmy and Katy in the English version, which was produced by Karl Hirsh in 2008. The US sales agent was Phase 4 Films, headquartered in Toronto, Ontario, Canada, but all rights are currently maintained by Art And Animation Studio.

== Release ==
Goat Story received a theatrical release on 16 October 2008 by Bontonfilm.

=== Marketing ===
The film appeared on the cover of the March 2008 edition of American publication Animation.

=== Home media ===
The film was released on DVD and Blu-ray on 10 April 2009 by Bontonfilm.

In 2015, the producers uploaded both Goat Story and its sequel on YouTube.

== Reception ==
The film did not fare well with some Czech critics. Reviewers criticized it for the fact that most of the jokes fell flat, is chauvinistic, sexist and thus not very suitable for children. Despite this, in 2009 the film was awarded the annual Febiofest Kristián award for Best Animated Film.

=== Box office ===
The film grossed $1.3 million in the Czech Republic, becoming the most successful Czech animated film of all time.

=== Awards ===
Year	Award	Category	Result
2009	Bangkok International Film Festival	Golden Kinnaree Award for Feature Animation	Nominated
2009	Czech Lion Award	Best Art Direction (Nejlepší výtvarný počin)	Nominated

=== Reference in popular culture ===
In the summer of 2023, 14 years after the film's premiere, snippets from the film began to circulate on foreign internet accounts, especially scenes featuring the character Katie, often in the form of memes. They were primarily shared on Twitter and TikTok, but also on other mainstream social networks. What caught the attention of internet users the most was especially the portrayal of Katie (and other women) with large breasts and buttocks, as well as the explicitness of nudity and violence. In an interview with The Hollywood Reporter, director Tománek stated that his intention was not to sexualize the character Katie, but to embody the Czech term “krev a mlíko” for a woman with a fuller figure, consistent with the overall exaggerated style of the film.

== Sequel ==
A sequel, Goat Story 2, was released in 2012.

== See also ==
- List of animated feature films
- List of computer-animated films
- Prague Astronomical Clock
