= Ota Jirák =

Czech actor and comedian (1949–2026)

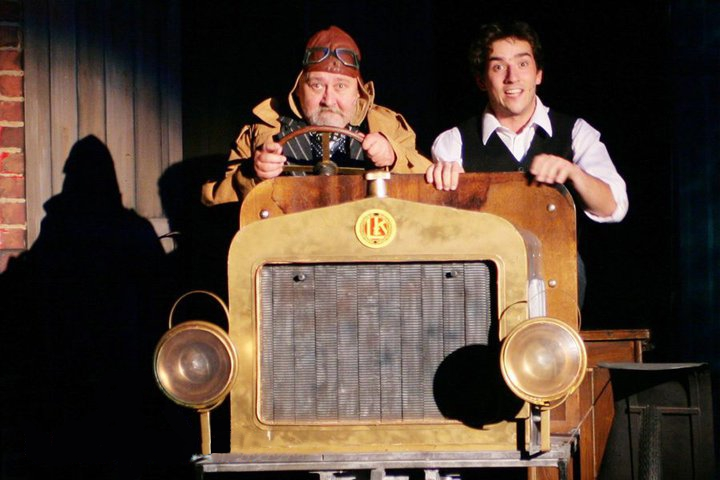
- Jirák (left) with Matouš Ruml in 2011
- Born: Otakar Jirák; 12 April 1949; Mladá Boleslav, Czechoslovakia
- Died: 17 October 2026 (aged 77)
- Education: Academy of Performing Arts in Prague
- Occupations: Actor, comedian
- Spouse: Drahomíra Jiráková
- Children: 1

Otakar Jirák, better known as Ota Jirák (12 April 1949 – 17 October 2026), was a Czech actor, voice actor and comedian. He had a distinctive, deep voice and was known for voicing the character Hele in the children's show Studio Kamarád, as well as various characters in animated films.

== Life and career ==
Otakar Jirák was born in Debř part of Mladá Boleslav on 12 April 1949. He graduated from puppetry at the Department of Dramatic Theatre at the Academy of Performing Arts, Prague in 1969. He was employed in various theatres, including Vedené divadlo Karla Makonje (1969–1971), Cirkus Alfréda Ctibora Turby (1973–1980), GAG Borise Hybnera (1980–1985), Prozatímní divadlo Fr. R. Čecha (1985–1990 and 1998–2000) and City Theatre of Mladá Boleslav (2003–2009). In 1991–1995, he was a guest actor in Semafor.

Jirák was known for his atypical, distinctive, and very deep voice. He made his film debut in the 1976 film Traja chrobáci directed by Ján Roháč. Among his best-known television roles was Head of Department Pantoflíček in Ordinace v růžové zahradě 2 (2006–2016).

Jirák's voice was put to use in dubbing. He became popular for voicing the character Hele in the Czech children's television show Studio Kamarád. He voiced Hele from 1982 until the end of 2025. He was also known for providing the dubbed voice of the title character, in the Czech version of the American sitcom television series ALF, which became his favourite voice-acting role. His other voice-acting roles for Czech dubbing include Hagrid in the Harry Potter film series, Kurt von Strohm in 'Allo 'Allo!, Obelix in the Asterix animated films, Tigger in the Winnie the Pooh animated films and TV series and Manny in the Ice Age animated films.

Jirák was married and had a daughter, Tereza. With his wife Drahomíra, he lived in a house near Mladá Boleslav. He died on 17 October 2026, at the age of 77.
