= Veronika Bromová =

Czech photographer, university educator and artist

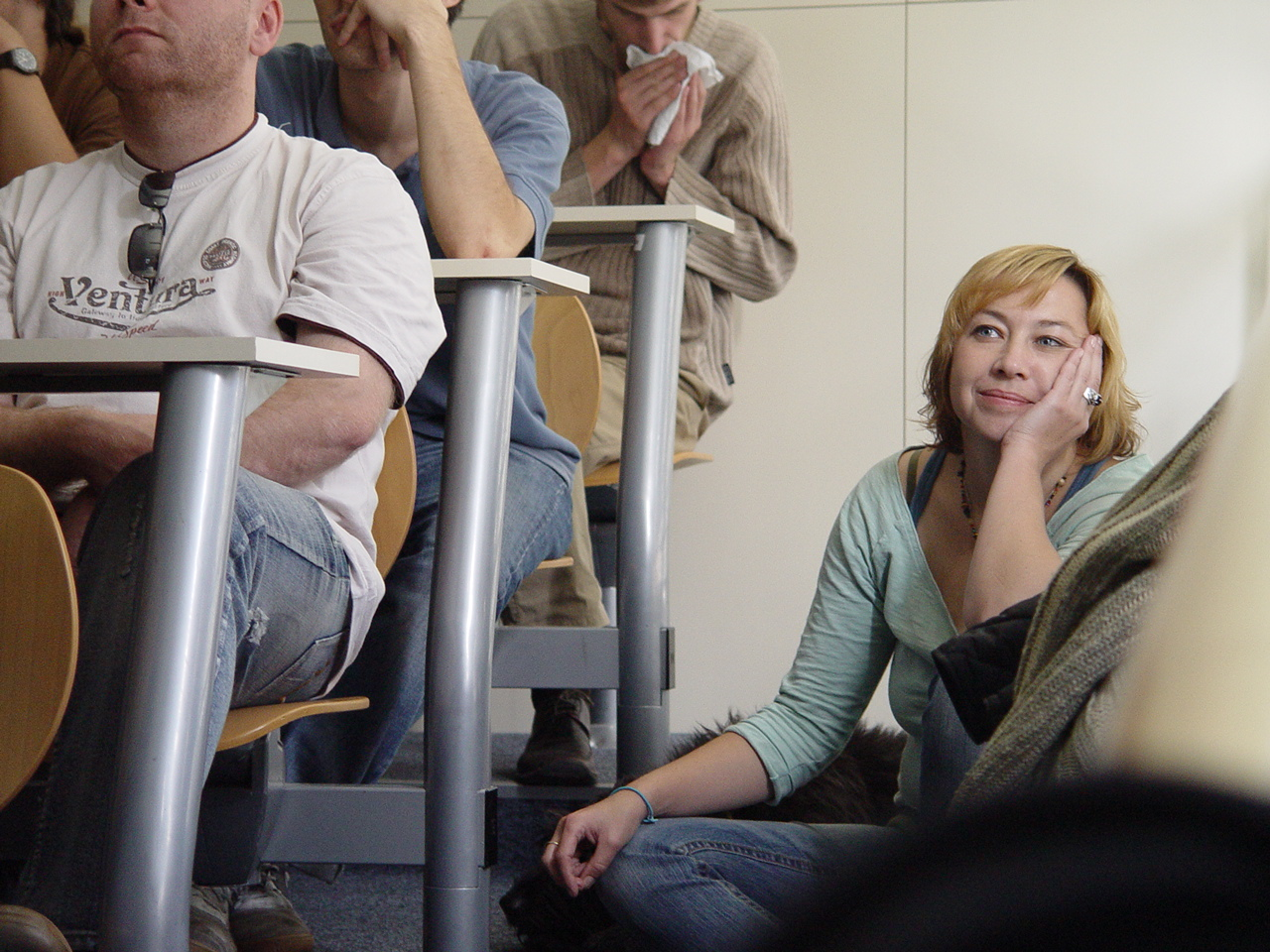
- Veronika Bromová at the University in Prague.
- Born: Prague
- Education: Graphics and illustrations
- Known for: New media
- Notable work: Prague Academy of Fine Arts

Veronika Bromova, born on 12 August 1966 in Prague, is a Czech new-media artist who focuses on computer manipulating photographs by using the program Photoshop. She lives and works in Prague. She is working with genre themes, feminism, pedophilia and mystery, and she has exhibited in Europe and the United States. She has received grants and awards, including a Czech "Grammy" for the best CD cover and the International Studio Program in New York, 1998. She represented the Czech Republic at the 1999 Venice Biennale in the Czechoslovakia building.

== Life and career ==
Bromova was discovered as a two-year-old by a well-known Socialist Realist sculptor, Lidicky, who used her as the model for the child in a monumental sculpture of the "Ideal Socialist Family." The sculpture was placed beside the national memorial building on a hill in central Prague, where the mummified body of Czechoslovakia's first Communist president, Klement Gottwald, was housed. The statue for which she modelled still stands there, but the building is virtually abandoned.

The core of Bromova's work is photographic; she often uses computer manipulation or adds objects. Her models are herself or those around her. The results go beyond mere portraiture or narcissism, however; rather, she is able to keep a distance from her subjects in the process of exploration of human body, its limitations, desires, and different forms.

== See also ==
- Digital art
