= Saturnin (film) =

1994 Czech comedy film by Jiří Věrčák

Saturnin is a Czech comedy film released in 1994.
