= Jaroslava Adamová =

Czech actress (1925–2012)

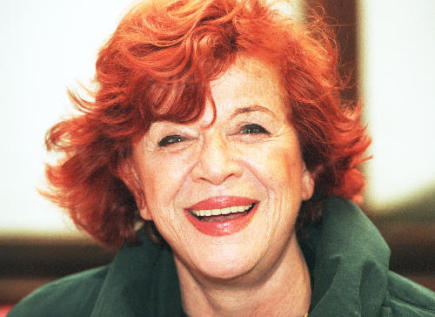
- Adamová in Prague in 1995
- Born: 15 March 1925; Prague, Czechoslovakia
- Died: 16 June 2012 (aged 87); Prague, Czech Republic
- Occupation: Actress
- Years active: 1949–2012

Jaroslava Adamová (15 March 1925 – 16 June 2012) was a Czech film, theater and voice over actress.

== Biography ==
Her professional career lasted more than sixty years, spanning Czechoslovakia and the Czech Republic. Adamová provided the Czech language voice dubbing for many international film actresses, including Jeanne Moreau, Sophia Loren, and Meryl Streep.

Adamová received the Thalia Award for theater in 1996. Czech President Václav Havel awarded Adamová the Medal of Merit in 2001. Additionally, she also won the František Filipovský Awards for her work in film voice dubbing.

Adamová died in Prague on 16 June 2012 at the age of 87.
