= Marie Poledňáková =

Czech film director and writer (1941–2022)

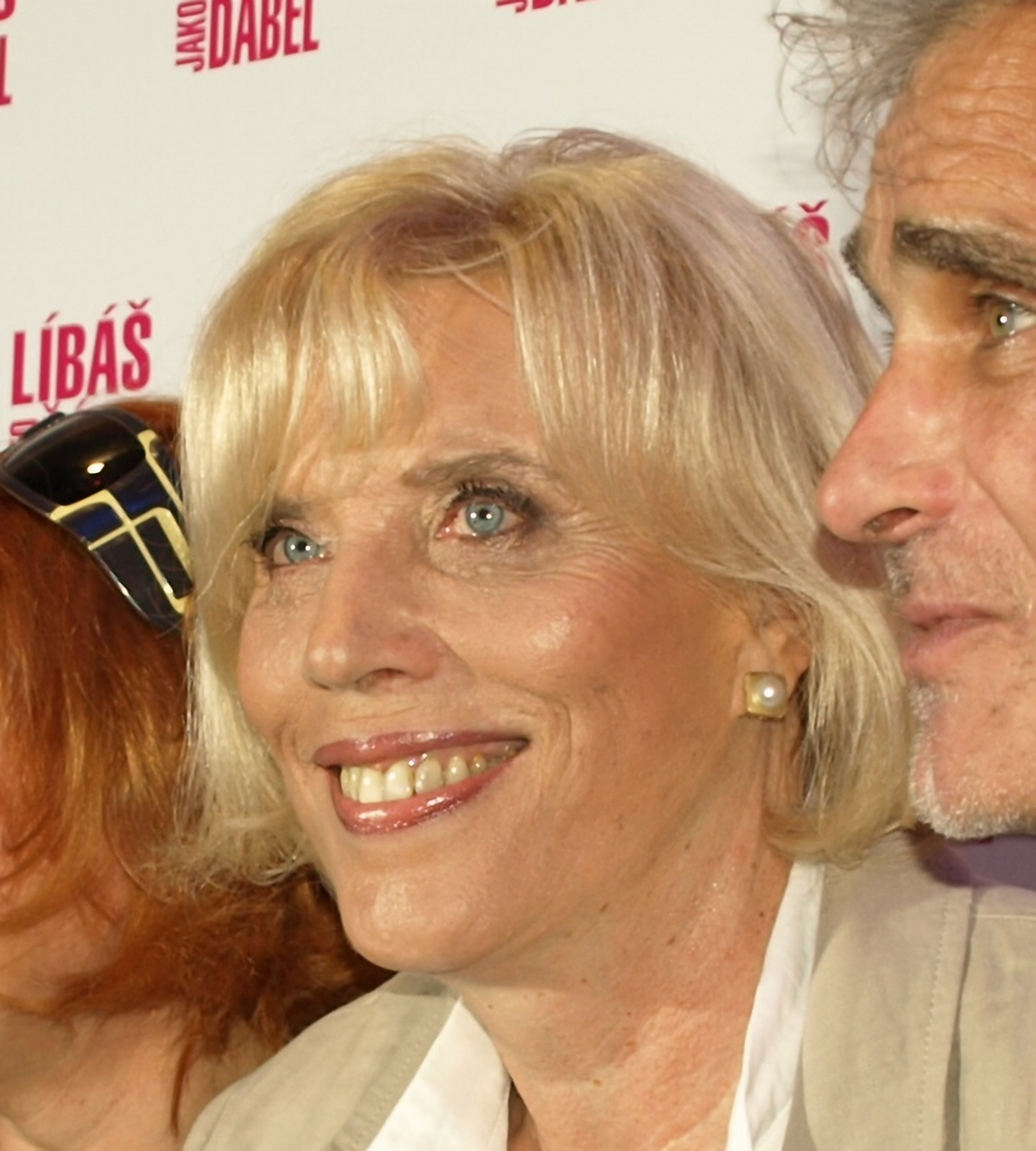
- Poledňáková in 2012
- Born: 7 September 1941; Strakonice, Protectorate of Bohemia and Moravia
- Died: 8 November 2022 (aged 81)
- Occupations: Film director; screenwriter; media entrepreneur
- Years active: 1973–2012
- Known for: I Enjoy the World with You
- Notable work: Jak dostat tatínka do polepšovny; Zkrocení zlého muže; Dva lidi v zoo; You Kiss Like a God; Líbáš jako ďábel

Marie Poledňáková (née Jandová; 7 September 1941 – 8 November 2022) was a Czech film director, screenwriter, writer, and media entrepreneur. She graduated from the Academy of Performing Arts in Prague in 1970.

== Biography ==
Poledňáková was born in Strakonice, the daughter of a university professor, and was raised in Nepomuk. After graduating from high school, she wanted to study chemistry, but this was not allowed: some members of her family had emigrated from the then-communist country and this was considered a serious offense which affected the rest of the family. Thus, instead of going to college, she went to work in a cookware factory.

Poledňáková married Ivan Poledňák, a musicologist, and they had one son, Petr Poledňák. The pair divorced when Petr was eight.

In 1961, dramaturge Jaroslav Dietl offered Poledňáková the position of assistant director at Czechoslovak Television. She worked in that capacity for 10 years while also taking evening classes at the Academy of Performing Arts in Prague. She went on to work as a screenwriter and director at the studio after graduating from the academy. In 1982, she took a position with Barrandov Studios, where she worked for six years as director. In 1990, Poledňáková co-founded the joint-stock company FTV Premiera (now Prima televize), which received the first license for private television broadcasting in the Czech Republic. After she sold her share in 1994, she became involved in the Premiéra Studio publishing house.

In 2016, Poledňáková suffered a non-fatal stroke. She died on 8 November 2022, at the age of 81.

== Filmography ==
- Hliněný vozíček (1973)
- Otevřený kruh (1973)
- Královské usínání (1974)
- Jak vytrhnout velrybě stoličku (1977)
- Jak dostat tatínka do polepšovny (1978)
- Kotva u přívozu (1980)
- I Enjoy the World With You (1982)
- Zkrocení zlého muže (1987)
- Dva lidi v ZOO (1990)
- Jak se krotí krokodýli (2006)
- You Kiss Like a God (2009)
- Líbáš jako ďábel (2012)
