= Miroslav Táborský =

Czech actor (born 1959)

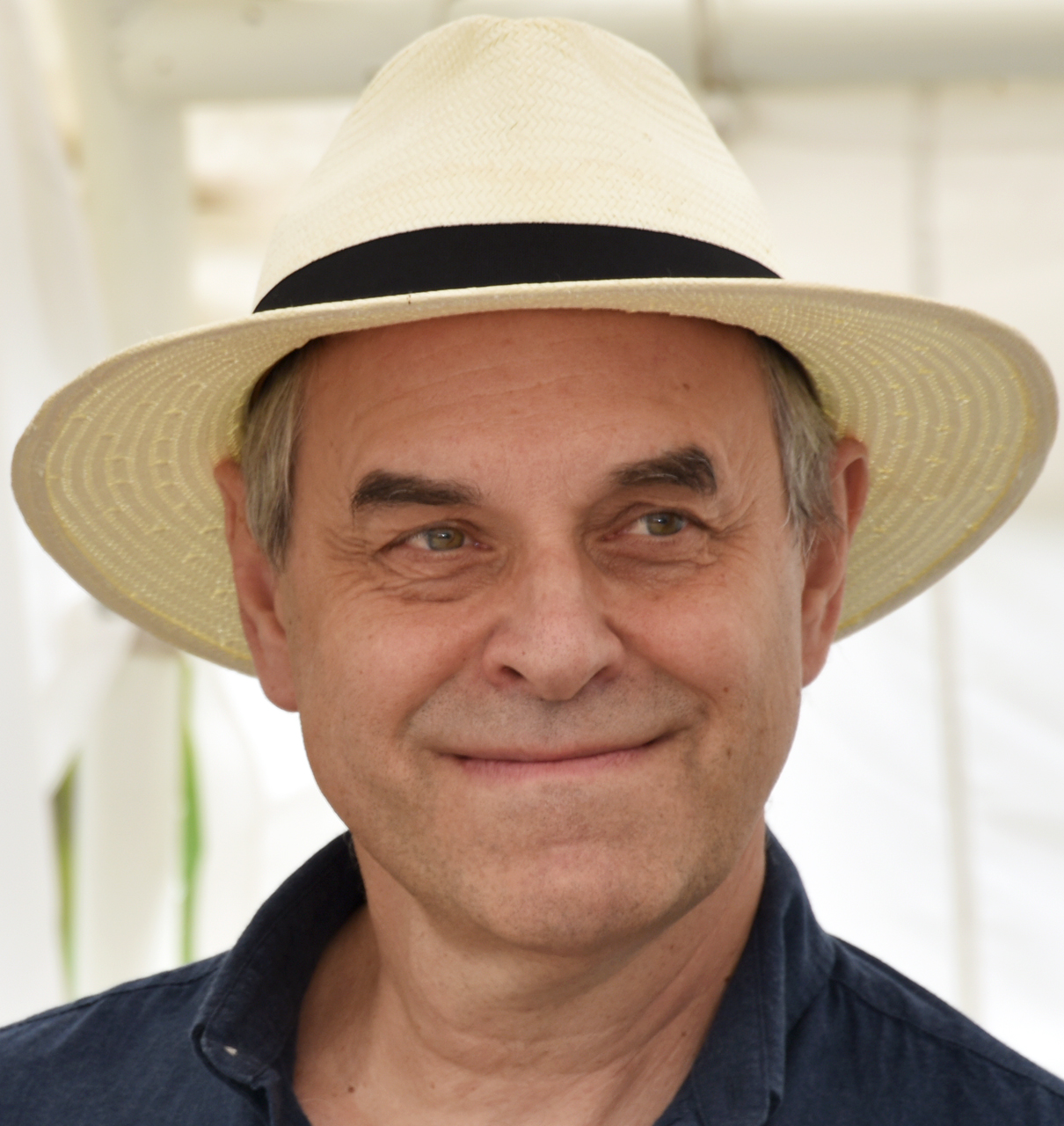
- Born: 9 November 1959 (age 66); Prague, Czechoslovakia
- Occupation: Actor
- Years active: 1987–present

Miroslav Táborský (born 9 November 1959 in Prague, Czechoslovakia) is a Czech actor who has appeared in Czech television series, as well as in American films.

== Life and career ==
Táborský studied physics at the University of Hradec Králové, and then graduated from the Theatre Faculty of the Academy of Performing Arts in Prague (DAMU) in 1987. Táborský has received both an Alfréd Radok Award (1997) and a Goya Award (1998, Category Best New Actor, La niña de tus ojos). He is also known as the voice actor for Holly in the Czech dub of Red Dwarf.

== Filmography ==
| Year | Title | Notes | | |
|---|---|---|---|---|
| Year | Title | Notes | 1996 | Lotrando a Zubejda |
| 1997 | Snow White: A Tale of Terror | | | |
| 1998 | La niña de tus ojos | Interpreter Václav Passer – Goya Award for Best New Actor | | |
| 2000 | Frank Herbert's Dune – Count Hasimir Fenring | Miniseries | | |
| 2001 | Tmavomodrý svět | | | |
| 2002 | The Dresser | By Ronald Harwood, Divadlo v Dlouhé theatre | | |
| 2004 | Eurotrip | | | |
| 2004 | Jak básníci neztrácejí naději | | | |
| 2005 | The Brothers Grimm | | | |
| 2005 | Hostel | | | |
| 2005 | Close to Heaven | | | |
| 2005 | Twelfth Night, or What You Will | Summer Shakespeare Festival at Prague Castle – Feste | | |
| 2008 | Grapes | | | |
| 2008 | Goat Story – The Old Prague Legends | 3D animated movie | | |
| 2009 | 2Bobule | | | |
| 2011 | Borgia | | | |
| 2012 | Goat Story with Cheese | 3D animated movie | | |
| 2016 | Stuck with a Perfect Woman | | | |
| 2017 | Barefoot | | | |
