= Roman Zach =

Czech actor

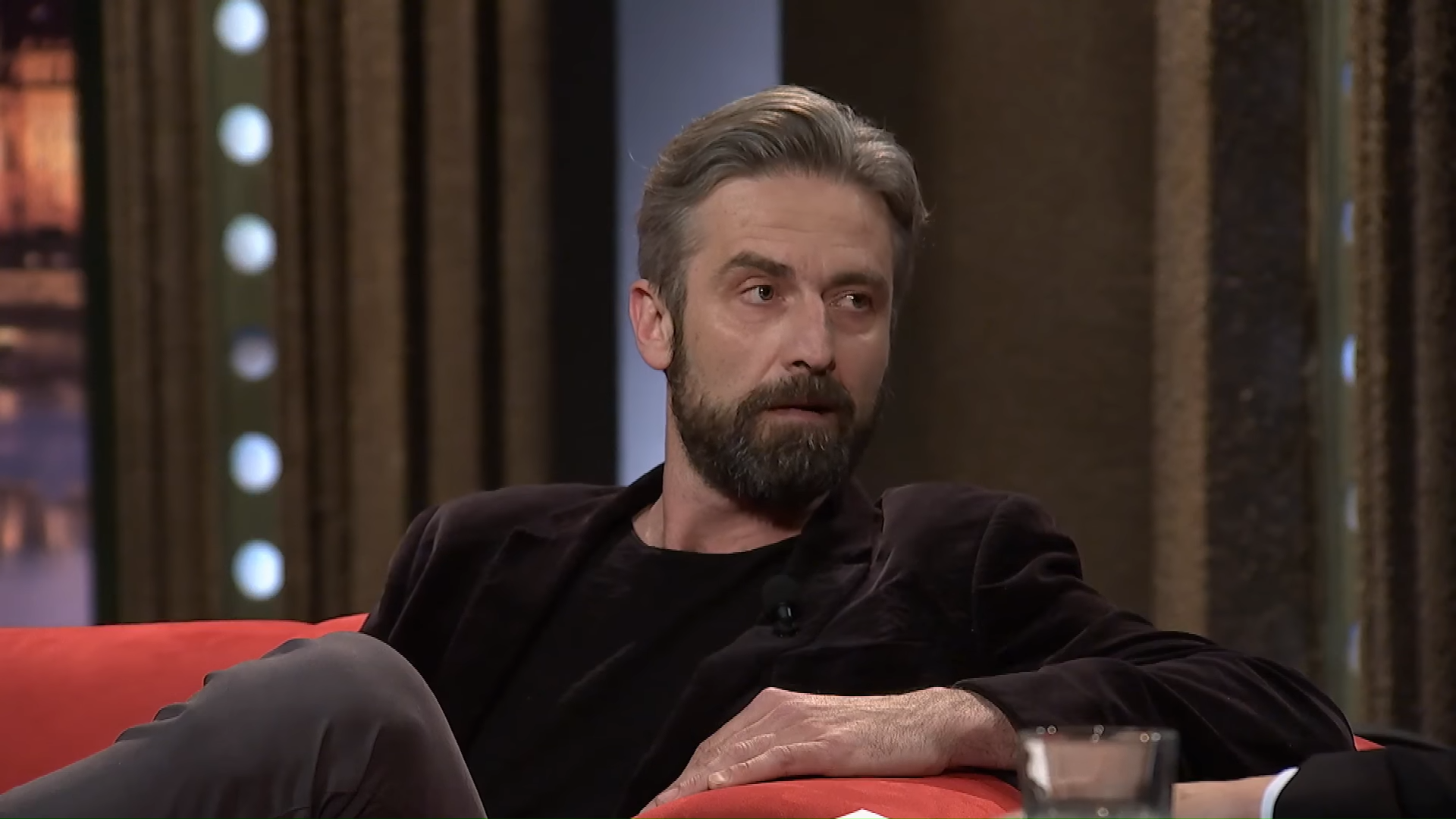
- Roman Zach (2017)
- Born: 13 June 1973 (age 53); Ústí nad Labem, Czechoslovakia
- Occupation: Actor
- Years active: 1995–present

Roman Zach is Czech actor. He was born 13 June 1973 in Ústí nad Labem, Czechoslovakia.

== Biography ==
He studied at a secondary technical school in Děčín. After that, he studied at DAMU in Prague.

== Theatre ==
=== Prague Chamber Theatre ===
- Kanibalové .... gypsy
- Qartet .... Valmont
- Rekonstrukce .... prof. Richard Kraus/Dr. Karel Kraus
- Parsifal .... parsifal
- Vodičkova-Lazarská .... O
- Předtím/Potom .... Phillipp
- Elfriede Jelinek .... spotštyk
- Žizkov .... Franta
- Světanápravce .... rektor
- Utrpení knížete Sternehoocha .... trhan
- Nadváha, nedůležité: Neforemnost ..... Jürgen
- Karlovo náměstí .... Jenda
- Snílci .... Tomáš
- Spiknutí .... Robert Hacken

=== National theatre ===
- The Playboy of the Western World .... Christy Mahon

=== Playhouse, Ú.n.L. ===
- Shopping and Fucking .... Mark
- Hamlet .... Hamlet

== Filmography ==
- Totem, tabu a andělé (1999) .... Jakub
- Primetime Murder (2000)
- Nikdo neměl diabetes (2001, TV Movie) .... Dr. Stanislav Misurec
- Únos domů (2002) .... pan Dlouhý
- Hodina tance a lásky (2003, TV Movie) .... Wolfgang "Wolfi" Weissmüller
- Město bez dechu (2003)
- Hop nebo trop (2003, TV Series) .... Mikuláš
- Vaterland - lovecký deník (2004) .... Vilém
- Redakce (2004-2005, TV Series) .... Kamil Fořt
- Ordinace v růžové zahradě (2005-2006, TV Series) .... MUDr. Michal Sebek
- Štěstí (2005)
- Bouřlivě s tebou (2007)
- Černá sanitka (2008, TV Series) .... moderator
- Walking Too Fast (2009)
- Ženy v pokušení (2010)
- Head Hands Heart (2010) .... Lieutenant Heinrich Roth
- Doktor od lesa hrochů (2010)
- Cyril and Methodius: The Apostles of the Slavs (2013) .... Metodej
- Fair Play (2014) .... Kríz
- I, Olga Hepnarová (2016) .... Psychiatrist Vaverka
- Anthropoid (2016) .... Father Petrek
- Jako z filmu (2017)
