= Television in the Czech Republic =

TV market share views in 2023:
1. Nova (18.0%)
2. Nova Cinema (3.21%)
3. Nova Gold (1.91%)
4. ČT1 (16.4%)
5. ČT24 (4.44%)
6. ČT2 (4.31%)
7. ČT Sport (3.32%)
8. Prima (12.0%)
9. Prima Krimi (4.06%)
10. Prima Max (2.53%)
11. Prima Love (2.15%)
12. Prima Cool (1.95%)
13. CNN Prima News (1.91%)
14. Other channels (23.9%)

Television was introduced in Czechoslovakia in 1953. Experimental projects with DVB-T started in 2000. Finally on 21 October 2005, multiplex A (DVB-T) was launched with three channels of Czech Television and one of TV Nova and radio channels of Czech Radio.

On 12 April 2006, six digital terrestrial television licenses were awarded to commercial broadcasters. The receivers of the licenses were: Z1, TV Pohoda, Regionální televizni agentura (RTA), Febio TV, TV Barrandov and Óčko. However, because of delays some projects lost investors and will not start (e.g. Fabio, Pohoda) or were cancelled. Z1 provided a news service in from 2008 to January 2011, when it ceased broadcasting. Óčko delivers a music service. TV Barrandov provides general programming services.

Czech Republic become the first country in Central Europe to start to end all analogue broadcasts in November 2011. The process completed when the last analogue transmitters in south-east Moravia and northern Moravia-Silesia were shut down on 30 June 2012.

== Czech TV Crisis ==
Between December 2000 and February, 2001, a struggle took place for control of Czech Television, locally known as ČT (Česká Televize). On 20 December 2000, Jiří Hodač was appointed the new director of ČT. A group of journalists felt that Hodač was too closely tied to former Prime Minister Václav Klaus, which would result in compromising ČT's journalistic integrity.

The journalists went on strike and occupied the newsroom, airing unauthorized newscasts. The new leadership sometimes cut the feed or replaced it with their own news reports. The unauthorized broadcasts displayed a "strike" logo in the corner of the screen. Citizens of Prague staged street protests in support of the journalists, which were the largest street protests since the overthrow of the communist government.

The Czech lower house of parliament met on 5 January 2001 to discuss the situation. Hodač was put under pressure to resign, and was eventually admitted to hospital after suffering an alleged breakdown from exhaustion. The stand-off and its strong public support resulted in the Social Democrats withdrawing support for Hodač. He resigned in January.

On 10 February 2001, the standoff ended with the signing of an agreement between the staff and station management, replacing Hodač with Jiří Balvín. The signing took place on live television. Balvín announced his goals for ČT to remain politically independent. The protests leading to the passing of new media legislation. However critics felt it provided fewer safeguards against political interference than the old laws.

== Most-viewed channels ==
The ATO measures television ratings in the Czech Republic since 1997. The channels with most share according to ATO's measurements were:

Channel	Logo	Whole-day share, 15+ (April 2010)	Whole-day share, 15+ (March 2011)	Whole-day share, 15+ (May 2014)
TV Nova		31.08%	31.24%	23.36%
Prima televize		16.92%	17.16%	14.26%
ČT1		17.53%	15.91%	14.27%
TV Barrandov		5.38%	4.83%	4.88%
ČT24		3.87%	4.60%	4.09%
Nova Cinema		3.90%	4.19%	3.8%
ČT Sport		2.00%	4.11%	7.6%
Prima Cool		2.95%	3.74%	3.1%
ČT2		3.63%	2.78%	3.95%
Prima Love		-	-	2.19%
Nova Action		-	-	1.44%
Nova Fun		-	-	1.2%
Nova Krimi		-	-	1.18%
Prima Zoom		-	-	1.92%

=== Broadcaster groups market share ===
Current
TV Group	Whole-day share, 15+ (January-December 2024)	Prime-time, 15+ (January-December 2024)	Whole-day share, 15-54 (January-December 2024)	Prime-time, 15-54 (January-December 2024)	Whole-day share, 18-69 (January-December 2024)	Prime-time, 18-69 (January-December 2024)
Czech Television	30.43%	30.17%	27.33%	27.38%	28.64%	28.56%
Nova Group	26.88%	30.43%	32.41%	34.95%	29.64%	32.56%
FTV Prima	26.83%	26.22%	23.31%	23.39%	25.32%	25.12%
Atmedia	6.18%	5.05%	6.00%	5.07%	6.45%	5.33%
Barrandov TV	2.28%	1.85%	0.87%	0.69%	1.51%	1.20%
Televize Seznam	1.66%	1.62%	1.54%	1.58%	1.78%	1.73%
Stanice O	0.24%	0.23%	0.37%	0.29%	0.29%	0.25%
Others	5.50%	4.43%	7.17%	6.65%	6.37%	5.25%

Historical 15+
Year	Nova Group	Czech Television	FTV Prima	Barrandov TS	Atmedia	Stanice O	TV Seznam	Others
1997	52.04%	35.55%	8.90%	—N/a	—N/a	—N/a	—N/a	3.51%
1998	51.61%	33.74%	11.08%	—N/a	—N/a	—N/a	—N/a	3.57%
1999	50.35%	32.23%	12.47%	—N/a	—N/a	—N/a	—N/a	4.95%
2000	46.37%	31.32%	16.55%	—N/a	—N/a	—N/a	—N/a	5.76%
2001	47.73%	29.11%	17.58%	—N/a	—N/a	—N/a	—N/a	5.58%
2002	44.23%	29.93%	20.33%	—N/a	—N/a	—N/a	—N/a	5.51%
2003	43.36%	29.62%	20.58%	—N/a	—N/a	—N/a	—N/a	6.44%
2004	42.23%	30.38%	21.58%	—N/a	—N/a	—N/a	—N/a	5.81%
2005	40.95%	29.77%	23.13%	—N/a	—N/a	—N/a	—N/a	6.15%
2006	41.76%	31.26%	20.28%	—N/a	—N/a	—N/a	—N/a	6.70%
2007	39.59%	31.89%	19.36%	—N/a	—N/a	—N/a	—N/a	9.16%
2008	38.30%	31.03%	17.93%	—N/a	—N/a	—N/a	—N/a	12.74%
2009	39.89%	28.57%	17.34%	1.50%	0.69%	—N/a	—N/a	12.01%
2010	36.12%	28.85%	17.37%	4.22%	2.32%	—N/a	—N/a	9.31%
2011	33.97%	27.64%	22.22%	5.07%	2.05%	—N/a	—N/a	9.02%
2012	29.85%	30.16%	24.19%	5.20%	2.01%	—N/a	—N/a	8.60%
2013	31.17%	29.84%	22.44%	4.39%	3.31%	—N/a	—N/a	8.84%
2014	31.98%	29.86%	21.54%	4.58%	3.88%	—N/a	—N/a	8.16%
2015	30.70%	30.42%	20.81%	5.53%	3.22%	0.76%	—N/a	8.37%
2016	28.71%	30.96%	21.03%	7.35%	3.09%	0.73%	—N/a	7.48%
2017	30.47%	29.20%	21.00%	8.66%	3.79%	0.71%	—N/a	5.25%
2018	29.05%	30.13%	22.66%	7.01%	3.43%	0.61%	—N/a	7.11%
2019	28.66%	29.99%	23.85%	6.27%	4.31%	0.52%	—N/a	6.40%
2020	27.09%	30.86%	24.78%	5.53%	4.74%	0.44%	—N/a	6.66%
2021	26.34%	32.34%	25.17%	3.99%	4.79%	0.39%	0.73%	6.25%
2022	26.42%	31.47%	26.90%	3.21%	4.77%	0.38%	1.01%	5.84%
2023	27.04%	29.88%	27.56%	2.63%	5.61%	0.32%	1.49%	5.47%
2024	26.88%	30.43%	26.83%	2.28%	6.18%	0.24%	1.66%	5.50%
2025	27.75%	29.29%	26.78%	2.06%	3.81%	0.28%	2.05%	2.48%

== List of channels ==
=== Terrestrial free-to-air channels (DVB-T2 & Satellite) ===
- Czech Television - public service broadcaster
  - ČT1 (HD) - main channel
  - ČT2 (HD) - second main channel
  - ČT24 (HD) - news channel
  - ČT Sport (HD) - sport channel
  - ČT :D (HD) / ČT art (HD) - time shared position (channel for kids / culture channel)
- Nova Group (PPF)
  - TV Nova (HD) - main channel
  - Nova Cinema (HD) - movie channel
  - Nova Action (HD) - channel for men
  - Nova Fun (HD) - channel for younger
  - Nova Krimi (HD) - crime series channel
  - Nova Lady (HD) - channel for women
  - Nova Sport 1 (HD) - sport channel with pay TV
  - Nova Sport 2 (HD) - sport channel with pay TV
  - Nova Sport 3 (HD) - sport channel with pay TV
  - Nova Sport 4 (HD) - sport channel with pay TV
  - Nova Sport 5 (HD) - sport channel with pay TV
  - Nova Sport 6 (HD) - sport channel with pay TV
- FTV Prima (GES)
  - TV Prima (HD) - main channel
  - Prima Cool (HD) - channel for younger
  - Prima Love (HD) - channel for women
  - Prima Zoom (HD) - documentary programs
  - Prima Max (HD) - movie channel
  - Prima Krimi (HD) - crime series channels
  - CNN Prima News (HD) - news channel
  - Prima Star (HD) - archive channel
  - Prima Show (HD) - reality show programs
  - Prima Sport (HD) - sport channel
  - Prima +1 - timeshifted channel
- TV Barrandov
  - TV Barrandov (HD) - main channel
  - Kino Barrandov (HD) - movie channel
  - Barrandov Krimi (HD) - crime documentary programs
- Markíza Slovakia (PPF)
  - Markíza International - czech version with Markíza
- JOJ Czech (J&T Group)
  - JOJ Family - czech version for TV JOJ
  - JOJ Cinema (HD) - movie channel with pay TV
  - CS Mystery - sci-fi documentary programs (former Kinosvět)
- Stanice O
  - Óčko - music channel
  - Óčko Expres - music channel with pay TV
  - Óčko Black - hip hop & rock music channel
  - Óčko STAR - retro music channel
- Seznam.cz
  - Seznam.cz TV (HD) - main channel
- AMC Networks International Central Europe
  - Spektrum Home - documentary programs
- Skydance Europe & Africa
  - Warner TV - serial & movie channel
- TV NOE
- DofE
- Šláger Originál
- Šláger Muzika
- Rebel
- Relax (former TV Pohoda)
- ABC TV
- Retro Music Television
- A11
- HIT TV
- DVTV Extra
- TraLaLa
- Nalaďte se na digitální vysílání CRA
- Televize pres antenu

=== Regional terrestrial free-to-air channels (DVB-T2) ===
- Praha TV
- Brno TV 1
- Info TV Brno a Jižní Morava
- Polar
- JTV
- JČ1 Televize jižní Čechy
- JČ2 Televize jižní Čechy
- i-Vysočina.cz
- LTV PLUS
- Plzeň TV
- RTM+
- Televize FILMpro
- TV Morava
- TVS
- TV ZAK
- Ústecká TV
- V1

=== Premium channels ===
==== Film ====
- HBO (HD) (version for Czech Republic and Slovakia)
- HBO 2 (HD)
- HBO 3 (HD) (former HBO Comedy)
- Cinemax (HD)
- Cinemax 2 (HD)
- AMC (former MGM Channel)
- TCM (English audio only)
- Film Europe (HD)
- Film Europe+
- Film+ (HD)
- FilmBox+ One
- FilmBox+ Comedy
- FilmBox+ Emotion
- FilmBox+ Festival
- FilmBox+ Hits (HD)
- FilmBox+ Love&Crime
- CS Film / CS Horor
- Canal+ Action

==== Entertainment ====
- AXN (HD) (version for Czech Republic and Slovakia)
- AXN Black
- AXN White
- BBC First
- E!
- Fashionbox HD
- Fashion TV (version for Czech Republic and Slovakia)
- Food Network (English audio only)
- HGTV
- TLC
- Hobby TV
- Mňam TV
- Mňau TV
- SYFY (coming soon)
- Viasat Epic Drama

==== Documentary ====
- Animal Planet (HD)
- BBC Earth
- Discovery Channel Europe (HD)
- Investigation Discovery
- Docubox HD (English audio only)
- NASA UHD
- National Geographic (HD) (version for Czech Republic and Slovakia)
- Nat Geo Wild (HD)
- H2 (English audio only)
- History Channel (HD)
- Crime and Investigation Network
- Spektrum (HD) (version for Czech Republic and Slovakia)
- Spektrum Home (former TV Deko)
- Travel Channel (HD)
- TV Paprika
- Fishing & Hunting TV
- Wild TV
- Travel xp
- Viasat History (HD)
- Viasat Explorer (HD)
- Viasat Nature (HD)
- Viasat True Crime (HD)
- Love Nature
- Nautical Channel
- CS History

==== Sport ====
- Canal+ Sport (version for Czech Republic and Slovakia)
- Eurosport 1 (HD)
- Eurosport 2 (HD)
- Extreme Sports Channel (Czech subtitles)
- Fast&FunBox HD
- FightBox (English audio only)
- Oneplay Sport 1
- Oneplay Sport 2
- Oneplay Sport 3
- Oneplay Sport 4
- Sport 1 (HD)
- Sport 2 (HD)
- Kanal1 Sport (HD)
- Kanal1 Xtra (HD)
- Premier Sport 1 (HD)
- Premier Sport 2 (HD)
- Premier Sport 3 (HD)
- Auto, Motor & Sport (HD) (version for Czech Republic and Slovakia)
- Ginx Esports TV (English audio only)
- Golf Channel (HD) (version for Czech Republic and Slovakia)

==== Kids and teens ====
- Disney Channel (former Jetix) (version for Czech Republic and Slovakia)
- Disney Jr. (English audio only)
- Cartoonito
- Cartoon Network
- Nickelodeon (version for Czech Republic and Slovakia)
- Nick Jr.
- Nicktoons
- Jim Jam
- Minimax
- Ducktv (HD)
- Baby TV

==== Music ====
- MTV Europe (Czech localization)
- Music Box
- Retro Music Television (FTA in regional DVB-T)
- Šláger Muzika
- Šláger Premium
- Stingray Classica
- Stingray CMusic
- Stingray iConcerts
- Mezzo (French version)
- Mezzo Live HD (French version)
- Deluxe Music
- 360 TuneBox (HD)

==== Erotica ====
- Leo TV
- Extasy TV
- Blue Hustler
- Hustler TV
- Penthouse TV (HD)
- Playboy TV (HD)
- Brazzers TV Europe (former Private Spice)
- Dorcel TV (HD)
- Dorcel XXX (HD)
- Private TV (former Daring TV! (former XXX X-Treme))
- EroX (HD)
- EroXXX (HD)
- Man-X
- X-MO
- The Adult Channel (UK version)

==== News ====
- Al Jazeera
- Arirang
- BBC News
- Bloomberg
- CGTN
- CNBC
- CNN
- DW
- Euronews
- France 24
- NHK World Japan
- Sky News
- TA3 (Slovak version)
- TRT World

== See also ==
- List of television stations
