= List of original shows by TV Barrandov =

The following is a list of original programs of TV Barrandov network.

== Series ==
- Bastardi
- Bezdružice
- Cyranův ostrov
- Čechovi
- Doktorka Kellerová
- Noha 22
- Odsouzené
- Ona a On
- Premiér
- Profesionálové
- Rodinné vztahy
- Soudce Alexandr
- Soudkyně Barbara
- Sousedé
- Stopy života

== News ==
- Krimi zprávy
- Moje zprávy
- Naše zprávy
- VIP svět

== Comedial shows ==
- Vtip za stovku!

== Talk show ==
- Aréna Jaromíra Soukupa
- Duel Jaromíra Soukupa
- Hovory Kalousek Soukup
- INSTINKTY Jaromíra Soukupa
- Na ostří nože se Soukupem
- Na rovinu se Soukupem, realita v talk show
- Týden s prezidentem

== Other shows ==
- Agáta Jaromíra Soukupa
- Nebezpečné vztahy
