= Czech TV crisis =

Disruption of Czech television, 2000–2001

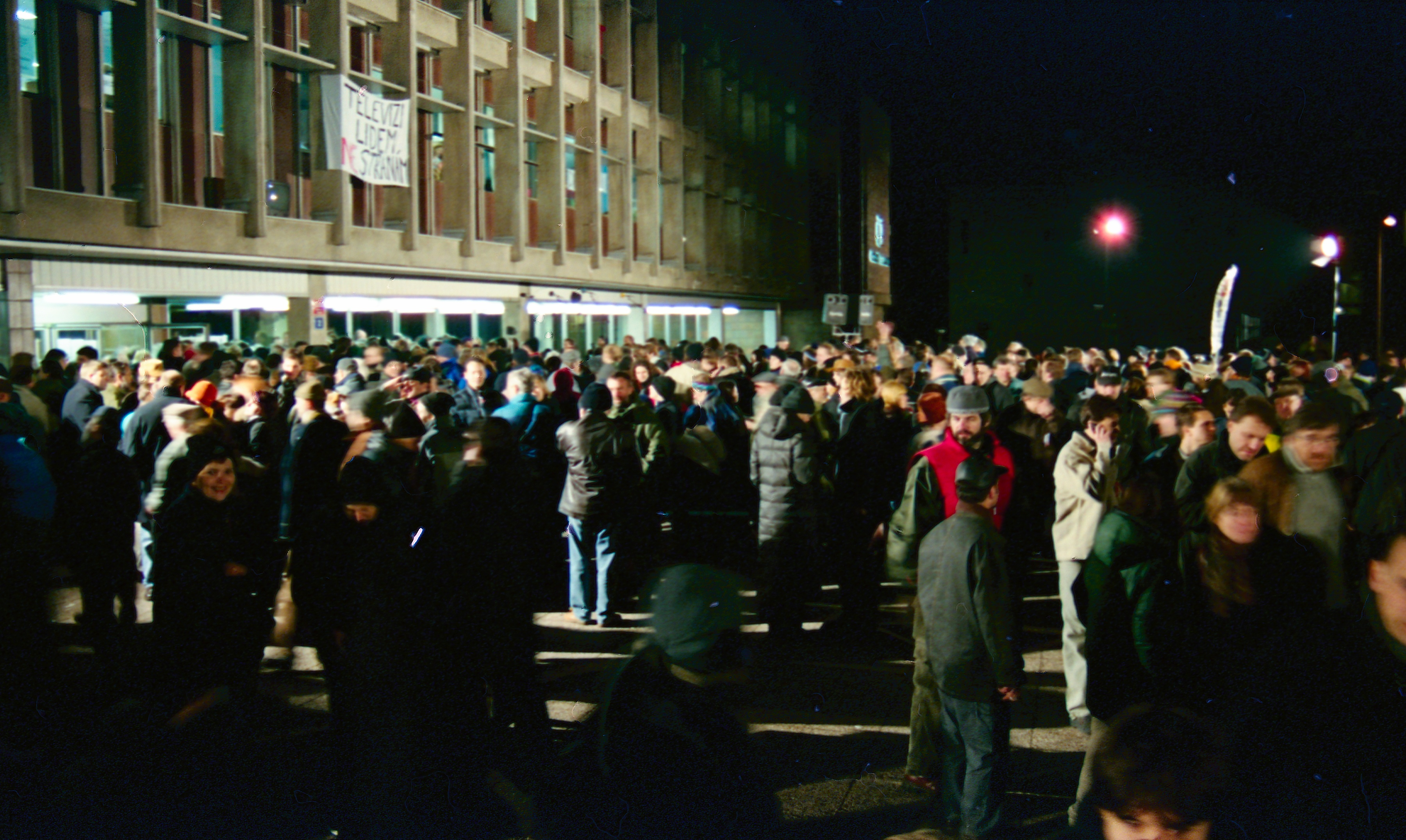
Evening demonstration – front of TV building (December 2000)

The Czech TV crisis was an event in the Czech Republic that occurred from the end of 2000 until February 2001 as a battle for control of the airwaves, which included broadcast jamming and accusations of censorship.

On 24 December 2000, news programs on Czech Television were interrupted by Jana Bobošíková, a veteran presenter at the channel and the newly-appointed head of the news department, sitting next to Jiří Hodač, a former BBC employee who had been appointed general manager of Czech Television earlier on 20 December.

== Description ==
The image reproduced here on a rare T-shirt displays a screenshot of a public message that appeared for a couple days on Czech Television's channels as its only programming during the height of the crisis. It translates to: General Manager of ČT Jiří Hodač has turned to the Council of the Czech Republic for Radio and Television Broadcasting with a request that it decide which programming of ČT is legal and authorized programming in accordance with the Act on Czech Television and which is not. Until the Council's decision, ČT will broadcast this statement as its programming.

During the Czech TV crisis, ČT reporters organized an industrial dispute by staging a sit-in and occupying the news studio, and rejected attempts by Bobošíková to fire them. They were supported in their protest by politicians such as the then President Václav Havel and by Czech celebrities, but every time they tried to air their news broadcasts, Jana Bobošíková and Jiří Hodač would interrupt the transmission either with a "technical fault" screen reading: "An unauthorized signal has entered this transmitter. Broadcasting will resume in a few minutes," or with their own news broadcasts featuring Jana Bobošíková and a team she had hired to "replace" the staff members she had sought to terminate; news content from Bratislava was also rebroadcast.

These broadcasts began being referred to as "Bobovize" (Bobovision) by the disputing TV reporters and their supporters who opposed the new management. On the other hand, throughout the crisis, Bobošíková's supporters, such as Václav Klaus and the then Czech Prime Minister Miloš Zeman, accused the protesting ČT reporters of law infringement and claimed that those reporters who rejected the changes were not so independent after all. Vladimír Železný also criticized the ČT reporters during his show on TV Nova, "Volejte řediteli" (lit. 'Call the Director').

Following the "technical fault" screens and prevention of the news broadcasts by Bobošíková tens of thousands of people marched in the streets of Prague and other Czech cities and towns, calling for restoration of freedom of the press, demanding an end to what they perceived as censorship at ČT. The demonstrations even drew support from the International Federation of Journalists and made world headlines. The demonstrators also demanded Bobošíková's resignation and the dismissal of the allegedly biased general manager Jiří Hodač. Hodač was even briefly hospitalized during the events.

=== Aftermath ===
Hodač resigned shortly after the demonstrations, citing health reasons, but the protesters vowed to continue their demonstrations in order to push for more resignations and a change in the law. The lower house of the Czech Parliament, the Chamber of Deputies of the Parliament of the Czech Republic, subsequently sacked the supervisory board of Czech Television, but a number of executives including Bobošíková refused to resign. The Chamber of Deputies then took control of Czech Television on a temporary basis until a General Director could be appointed. The Czech TV crisis eventually ended in February 2001, following the departure of the remaining executives.

Jiří Janeček, one of the news anchors who occupied the studio in protest, was later elected Director General, a role he held until 2011. Bobošíková was later hired to host the political discussion program Sedmička on the private-owned TV Nova. She was elected a member of the European Parliament in 2004 on Železný's ticket but soon split with him.

== See also ==
- Česká televize
- Television in the Czech Republic
- Closure of ERT
- 2023 Polish public media crisis
