= Nova International =

Czech television station

- Country: Czech Republic
- Headquarters: Prague

Programming
- Language: Czech

Ownership
- Owner: CME
- Sister channels: TV Nova; Nova Cinema; Nova Action; Nova Fun; Nova Krimi; Nova Lady; Nova Sport 1 Nova Sport 2 Nova Sport 3 Nova Sport 4 Nova Sport 5 Nova Sport 6

History
- Launched: 1 February 2016

Nova International is a Czech television station intended for broadcasting abroad. The channel is focused on TV Nova's own programs that have broadcasting rights in Slovakia, e.g. Ulice, Ordinace v růžové zahradě, Gympl s (r)učením omezeným, Na vodě, Televizní noviny, Snídaně s Novou, Počasí, Prásk!, Střepiny or Víkend.

== Programming ==
=== TV Series ===
- Doktori z Počátků
- Ordinace v růžové zahradě 2
- Specialisté
- Ulice

=== TV News ===
- Televizní noviny
- Sportovní noviny
- Počasí

=== TV Show ===
- Babicovy dobroty
- Country estráda
- Do-Re-Mi
- Kolotoc
- Korení
- Mr. GS
- Paskál
- Snídane
- Tele Tele
- Víkend
