= CME/Lauder v. Czech Republic =

International arbitration cases

CME v. Czech Republic and Lauder v. Czech Republic were parallel cases decided by two different arbitral tribunals in 2001. The difference in the two cases' outcomes is a prime example of conflicting decisions in international arbitration and is the subject of many treatises, with some authors going as far as calling it "the ultimate fiasco in investment arbitration".

In 1993, US national Ronald Steven Lauder invested in Czech private television broadcaster TV Nova through his German company (which was later succeeded by the Dutch company Central European Media (CME)). Some 20 suits started in front of the Czech courts and international tribunals, including UNCITRAL arbitrations CME v. Czech Republic and Lauder v. Czech Republic, after his business partner, Czech citizen Vladimír Železný, effectively deprived CME of its investment by breaking off the deal between Lauder's and Železný's companies. CME and Lauder respectively sought damages for the alleged interference of the Czech Media Council, a government entity granting broadcasting licences, into the business arrangements between Lauder's and Železný's companies, which supposedly eventually contributed to losses experienced by Lauder. Effectively dealing with the same facts, the tribunals handed down two contradictory arbitral awards: one dismissed the claim by Lauder, while the other awarded CME damages of $270 million and 10% interest. Finally, Czech Republic paid $355 million.

== Background ==
Following the Velvet Revolution in 1989, the once again democratic Czechoslovakia ratified a number of bilateral investment treaties in order to attract foreign investments. In 1991, Czechoslovakia concluded one bilateral investment treaty with the United States ("USA-CZ treaty") and another with the Netherlands ("NL-CZ treaty"). During the same year a new Media law was passed, under which the Media Council was created in order to grant broadcasting licences. The Czech Republic became a successor to these treaties following the dissolution of Czechoslovakia.

In 1992 a small group of Czech citizens founded a company called Central European Television 21 (CET 21) in order to acquire a licence for television broadcasting. CET 21 was cooperating with Central European Development Corporation (CEDC) effectively owned through another company by Ronald Lauder. Together they formed a new joint company named Česká nezávislá televizní společnost (ČNTS) with the participation of CET21, a Czech bank and, as a majority shareholder, a company representing the foreign investor. The key person Vladimír Železný became head of both CET21 and ČNTS. The newly established TV station TV Nova immediately became popular and very profitable. However, in 1999 Železný was fired from ČNTS. Subsequently, CET21 terminated its contract with ČNTS, after the latter failed to submit the Daily Log regarding the broadcasting for the next day.

The Media Council attempted to influence the relationship between the CET21 and ČNTS: firstly when the council granted a licence in 1992 and 1993, then after a new Media Law became effective around 1996, and finally in 1999 when the breach between the two companies happened.

On 19 August 1999, Ronald Lauder, majority owner of CME, which was in turn the majority owner of ČNTS, started UNCITRAL arbitration against the Czech Republic under the USA-CZ treaty ("London arbitration"). Meanwhile, on 22 February 2000, CME initiated parallel UNCITRAL arbitration proceedings against the Czech Republic under the NL-CZ treaty ("Stockholm arbitration").

== Relief sought ==
Arbitrators
- Lauder v. Czech Republic
  - Robert Briner (chairman)
  - Lloyd Cutler
  - Bohuslav Klein
- CME v. Czech Republic
  - Wolfgang Kühn (chairman)
  - Stephen Myron Schwebel
  - Jaroslav Hándl (dissented)

=== Claimant ===
Lauder and CME sought similar relief in the London and Stockholm arbitrations respectively:

- Declaring, that the Czech Republic has violated the following provision of the respective investment treaty:
  - The obligation of fair and equitable treatment of investments - Article II(2)(a) of USA-CZ treaty / Article 3 (1) NL-CZ treaty
  - The obligation of full security and protection - Article II(2)(a) of USA-CZ treaty / Article 3 (2) NL-CZ treaty
  - The obligation to treat investments at least in conformity with the rules/principles of international law - Article II(2)(a) of USA-CZ treaty / Article 3 (5) NL-CZ treaty
  - The obligation not to impair
    - investments by arbitrary and discriminatory measures - Article II(2)(b) of USA-CZ treaty
    - the operation, management, maintenance, use, enjoyment or disposal of investments by unreasonable or discriminatory measures - Article 3 (1) NL-CZ treaty
  - The obligation not to
    - expropriate investments directly or indirectly though measures tantamount to expropriation - Article III of USA-CZ treaty
    - deprive Claimant of its investments by direct or indirect measures - Article 5 NL-CZ treaty
- Declaring that the Czech Republic is obliged to pay damages as a consequence of the treaty violations in an amount to be determined in a second phase of the arbitration
- Declaring that the Czech Republic will pay the Claimant's cost

=== Respondent ===
The Czech Republic sought this relief in the arbitrations:

- London arbitration:
  - Dismissal of claim on grounds of jurisdiction, namely i) no "investment dispute" and/or ii) prematurity or other defect of Lauder's notice
  - Dismissal on grounds of lack of admissibility, namely abuse of process
  - Dismissal on grounds of non-violation of the USA-CZ treaty
  - Dismissal on grounds that the alleged injury was not the direct and foreseeable result of violation of the Treaty
  - Declaring that Lauder is to pay Respondent's costs
- Stockholm arbitration:
  - Dismissal as an abuse of process
  - Dismissal on grounds of non-violation of the NL-CZ treaty
  - Dismissal on grounds that the alleged injury was not the direct and foreseeable result of violation of the Treaty
  - Declaring that CME is to pay Respondent's costs

== Findings ==
=== Procedural issues ===
The tribunals had to deal with a number of procedural issues. Firstly, the same dispute was submitted to the Czech courts, to the other arbitration in Stockholm/London respectively, and also to ICC as a proceeding between Železný and CME. The London arbitration observed, that neither Lauder nor the Czech Republic are parties to any of the numerous proceedings, and that none of these courts would decide on the basis of the USA-CZ treaty and that the concurrent Stockholm arbitration will base its decision on the NL-CZ treaty. On the other hand, the Stockholm arbitration stressed that "a party may seek its legal protection under any scheme provided by the laws of the host country ... (and that both bilateral investment treaties) are part of the laws of the Czech Republic and neither of the treaties supersedes the other." The London panel noted, that collecting damages by the Claimant in either of the processes may reduce the damage claimed in the present proceeding, and it further pointed out, that the Czech Republic refused de facto consolidation of the two proceedings by insisting on different arbitral tribunals in the cases, rather than having the same tribunal decide both, as proposed by Lauder and CME.

=== Merits ===
The London tribunal held that the Czech Republic "did not take any measure of, or tantamount to, expropriation of the Claimant's property rights within any of the time periods, since there was no direct or indirect interference by the Czech Republic in the use of Mr. Lauder's property or with the enjoyment of its benefits."

==== 1993 events ====
Nevertheless the London tribunal found violation of the US-CZ treaty (prohibition against arbitrary and discriminatory measures) as regards acts of the Media Council in the year 1993, when the Media Council insisted on CEDC (affiliated with CME) not becoming a direct shareholder of CET21: the Media Council was concerned with the prospect of direct participation by a foreign investor in the holder of nation-wide broadcasting licence (CET21). A new entity ČNTS was therefore created with CEDC contributing 75% of CNTS' capital while obtaining 66% ownership, a Czech bank contributing 25% of capital while obtaining 22% ownership and CET21 contributing "the right to use, benefit from, and maintain the License (...) on an unconditional, irrevocable and exclusive basis" while obtaining 12% ownership.

One of the Media Council's aims was to prevent direct participation of foreign capital in license holders. The arrangement in 1993 was therefore as follows: CET21 was the licence holder, CEDC provided the majority of capital, and their joint company ČNTS did the actual broadcasting. The Stockholm award evaluated the 1993 development as follows: "The Media Council violated the (NL-CZ) Treaty when dismantling the legal basis of the foreign investor's investments by forcing the foreign investor’s joint venture company ČNTS to give up substantial accrued legal rights." The Respondent's objection, that the Media Council would not exercise its power, or if it did, the investor would be able to seek a remedy against the Council's decision in front of the Czech courts, was evaluated as follows: "A threat does not become legal upon the victim's surrender to the threat and the surrender cannot be deemed as waiver of its legal rights."

==== 1996–1997 events ====
In 1995 the Media law was amended. The most relevant modification was that the Media Council could no longer include conditions for the broadcasting operator in its decision to grant a license. Also, the new law had a much narrower definition of the term "broadcaster" as the person to whom a license was granted. Following the change of the law, the CET21 asked for the removal of condition No. 17, which was safeguarding the split structure of licence-holder and operator. Subsequently, the Media Council requested expert opinion regarding the ČNTS' authority to operate television broadcasting. Dr. Jan Bárta of the State and Law Institute of the Academy of Sciences of the Czech Republic rendered a legal opinion within one week after the request, which concluded that CET21 does not operate broadcasting and never did, whereas ČNTS was broadcasting without authority. The Stockholm award labeled circumstances of the rendering of Barta's opinion as "dubious" and concluded that "Barta's opinion was requested by the Media Council simply as a tool to cover up the reversal of the Council's legal position towards CET21 and the foreign investor CEDC/CME".

The companies set forward to modify the arrangement in order to address the concerns expressed by the expert opinion. In doing so, they consulted the Media Council, which in turn requested further expert opinion. After meetings with the Media Council, the companies entered a new agreement in May 1996 setting forth their legal relationship: in substance, CET21 was the holder of the License and the operator of television broadcasting, the License was non-transferable, and was not the subject of a contribution from CET21 to ČNTS. ČNTS' role was to arrange the television broadcasting.

In June 1996 the Media Council informed CET21 that the latter had breached the License by failing to make a timely announcement of changes in the registered capital, in the signing process, and in the company's registered office. It directed CET21 and ČNTS to change their registration with the Commercial Registry, particularly to modify ČNTS' business activity with respect to "television broadcasting". Meanwhile, in June 1996 a criminal investigation started with respect to CET21's and ČNTS' rights to administer TV Nova. Then, in July 1996, the Media Council started administrative proceedings against the ČNTS for broadcasting without authorization. Meanwhile, in August 1996, CME and Mr. Železný entered into a loan agreement pursuant to which the former would provide the latter with a loan of $4,700,000 for acquiring 47% of CET21's stock from the other individual shareholders. The agreement provided for Mr. Železný to exercise all his voting rights as directed by CME until full repayment of the loan. The Media Council was not informed of the change in CET21's ownership. In November, the agreement between the companies was further amended, so that ČNTS was granted the unconditional, irrevocable, and exclusive right to use and maintain the know-how and make it a source of profit for the Company, in connection with the License, its maintenance and protection. In addition, ČNTS was granted the right to acquire the License from CET21 in the case of change in the legal regulation and prevailing interpretation of the legal community.

Assessment of the situation by the two tribunals differs significantly. The London tribunal found, that there were several facts casting doubt on whether CET21 or ČNTS was actually operating the broadcasting of TV Nova: ČNTS' entry in the Commercial Registry stated that the business activity was "operating television broadcasting on the basis of the license no. 001/1003", ČNTS had entered into agreements with other companies for the dissemination of broadcasting, at the time Železný was head of both companies, and finally, most activities in connection with TV Nova were performed from ČNTS' large premises in Prague with an important staff, whereas CET21 had a much smaller organisation. Therefore, it assessed:

all these facts lead to confusion of the roles actually played by ČNTS and CET21 and the Media Council could legitimately fear that a situation had arisen where there had been a de facto transfer of the License from CET21 to ČNTS ... The commencement of the administrative proceedings against ČNTS for alleged unauthorized broadcasting constituted the normal exercise of the regulatory duties of the Media Council (and) was not arbitrary.

Meanwhile, the Stockholm award states that "the events in 1996 as documented by the exhibits to the parties' submissions are decisive in sustaining the conclusion that the Media Council in 1996 forced ČNTS and CME to agree to undermine the legal protection of CME's investment."

According to the Stockholm award all this was done in order to "re-establish its control over the broadcasting operations of CET21/ČNTS" which was lost due to the amendment of the Media act, which took away the Council's power to grant license subject to conditions. The London award on the same issue found that "the main reason for the Media Council to direct CME, CET21 and ČNTS to bring some modifications was the same as the ground for initiating the administrative proceedings (...) i.e. the fear that the unclear legal and factual situation could actually amount to a de facto transfer of the License from CET21 to ČNTS, in violation of Media Law."

The Stockholm award went as far as stating, that "the Media Council was obliged to defend and secure (1993 ČNTS/CET21/CEDC structure) after having attracted foreign investment on the basis of it." That, according to the Stockholm award, amounted to breach of the NL-CZ treaty by "coercing CME and ČNTS to give up legal security for CME's investment in the Czech Republic."

==== 1999 events ====
On 5 August 1999, CET21 terminated its contractual relationship with ČNTS, after the latter failed to supply the Daily Log.

The events leading to this are described by the London tribunal as follows:

Between 1997 and 1999 the Media Council did not want to take sides with respect to the dispute between CET21 and ČNTS, which was considered a commercial dispute. In particular, the Media Council's letter of March 15, 1999, whose wording is different from the one requested by Mr. Železný, expressed the Media Council's policy in a lawful and non-discriminatory manner.

Stockholm tribunal's assessment differed significantly: "In 1999, the Media Council actively supported the destruction of CME's investment in ČNTS." Assessing the same letter of March 15, 1999, the Stockholm tribunal held: "The Media Council was obviously working hand-in-hand with Dr. Železný when supporting Dr. Železný in his attack upon CME's already fragile basis for CME's investment in ČNTS."

==== Conclusions ====
The London Tribunal in conclusion held that "none of the actions or inactions of the Media Council caused a direct or indirect damage to Mr. Lauder's investment. The action which actually caused the Claimant to lose part of his investment was the termination by CET21 of its contractual relationship in 1999."

The Stockholm Tribunal in conclusion held that "The destruction of CME's investment after the termination of the Service Agreement on August 5, 1999 was the consequence of the Media Council's actions and inactions."

== Decisions ==
=== Lauder v. Czech Republic ===
The London Tribunal decided that a breach of US-CZ treaty occurred in 1993, that there were no other breaches of the treaty and it denied all claims for damages. (with fees, travel and other expenses incurred by the arbitrators being $501,370,20.)

=== CME v. Czech Republic ===
The Stockholm tribunal decided that the Czech Republic breached all the Articles as sought by the CME. In the final decision, it awarded CME damages of $269,814,000 plus 10% interest from the date of arbitration per annum and $1,007,749.81 of costs (with same interests).

==== Dissent ====
Arbitrator Jaroslav Hándl did not sign the partial CME award and made a dissenting opinion with reservations partially about facts and especially about the legal conclusions. He wrote, that "mistakes and errors in the legal conclusions have been caused basically by the fact, that the two arbitrators seem to have firstly agreed upon the final decision as it is expressed in the Award and only thereafter they looked for the arguments to the favour of the Claimant", that "principally the parties to this dispute did never have an equal position" and that he was "excluded from any discussion" as the two other arbitrators alone worked on the award.

While the final award was signed by all arbitrators, Professor Ian Brownlie, who replaced Mr Hándl, wrote a separate opinion challenging many aspects of the award.

== Aftermath ==
Final decision (including damages calculation) of the Stockholm tribunal was issued on 14 March 2003. Subsequently, the Czech Republic petitioned the Svea Court of Appeal to set aside the decision, mostly using Jaroslav Hándl´s dissenting opinion. Simultaneously the Czech Republic and CME agreed, that the Czech Republic will immediately pay damages and costs of the decision to the escrow account with 1.2% interest and CME will not enforce the decision until the decision of Svea Court. On 4 April 2003 the Czech republic paid $354,943,542 on the escrow account and on 13 May 2003 the Czech republic lost the case at the Svea court.

=== CME and TV Nova ===
Since 1999 influence of Vladimír Železný in TV Nova licence holder CET 21 declined. Jiří Šmejc's MEF Holding increased its influence by providing money for new start of TV Nova, in 2002 Petr Kellner's PPF started to be strongly involved. Due to numerous legal disputes between Vladimír Železný, MEF Holding and PPF the ownership structure of CET 21 was unknown. On 14 May 2003 Vladimír Železný was removed from post of CEO of CET21, on 8 October 2003 PPF bought majority stake in ČNTS from CME for app. 1.45 CZK billion ($53.2 million) to end numerous distupes arising from 1999 events. Finally in December 2004 CME announced to acquire majority stake in CET21 from PPF for $642 million and thus to control TV Nova again.
