= List of original shows by Óčko =

The following is a list of original programs of Óčko network.

== Series ==
- Single Lady

== Other shows ==
- DJ divák
- Drive
- Hitrádio Desítka
- Inbox
- Mixxxer Extra
- Mixxxer Feed
- Mixxxer Live
- Limuzína
- Naked Attraction
- Ne***telní
- Noční chat
- Óčko Black List
- Óčko Black Spotify Czech List
- Óčko Chart
- Óčko hity
- Ranní fresh
- TOP 10
- YouTube Chart
