= Podhradí =

Podhradí may refer to places in the Czech Republic:

- Podhradí (Cheb District), a municipality and village in the Karlovy Vary Region
- Podhradí (Jičín District), a market town in the Hradec Králové Region
- Podhradí (Zlín District), a municipality and village in the Zlín Region
- Podhradí, a village and part of Bakov nad Jizerou in the Central Bohemian Region
- Podhradí, a village and part of Třemošnice in the Pardubice Region
- Podhradí, a village and part of Vítkov in the Moravian-Silesian Region
- Podhradí nad Dyjí, a municipality and village in the South Moravian Region
- Zvíkovské Podhradí, a municipality and village in the South Bohemian Region
- Podhradí (podcast), a podcast hosted by Michal Půr as he interviews Czech president Petr Pavel
