= Nova Krimi =

Czech television channel

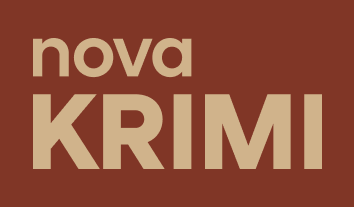
- Country: Czech Republic
- Headquarters: Prague

Programming
- Language: Czech
- Picture format: 16:9 (HDTV)

Ownership
- Owner: CME
- Sister channels: TV Nova; Nova Cinema; Nova Action; Nova Fun; Nova Lady; Nova Sport 1 Nova Sport 2 Nova Sport 3 Nova Sport 4 Nova Sport 5 Nova Sport 6 Nova International

History
- Launched: 22 February 2013
- Former names: TV Telka (2012–2017); Nova Gold (2017–2025)

Availability

Terrestrial
- DVB-T/T2: MUX 24 (FTA)

Streaming media
- Nova.cz: Watch live (Czech only)

Nova Krimi (originally Telka and Nova Gold) is a Czech free-to-air commercial TV Channel belonging to the Nova Group, whose program includes series and programs from the Nova station archive and foreign crime series. The station began broadcasting on February 22, 2013, to mark Nova's nineteenth birthday. Like other Nova Group channels, they belong to the CET 21 company, which falls under the CME. Nova Gold bears its current name since 4 February 2017, 2017 when the Telka channel was renamed Nova Gold in order to unify the channel names of the Nova group.

== History ==
The original plan was to launch the station on Nova's 19th birthday celebration, but CET 21 applied for a broadcasting license for the new channel in December 2012. The Broadcasting Council granted the necessary license on 5 February 2013. For this reason, the original plan for the new channel to begin broadcasting on TV Nova's 19th birthday, which on 4 February 2013, fell through. So the station was launched on 22 February 2013 at 2:00 p.m. and started broadcasting with the edited program Nova sebe. On 21 February 2013, it was announced that the station would also appear on satellite.

In the past, the program called Telka was run by Radim Pařízka's Digital Broadcasting company.

In 2014, Nova was granted a request to reduce the broadcast of European works from 10% to 3% on the Telka station.

On the occasion of its 23rd birthday, Nova decided to rename the Telka channel to Nova Gold as of February 4, 2017. The Fanda channels were also renamed to Nova Action and Smíchov to Nova 2

In November 3, 2025 Nova Gold renamed to Nova Krimi.

== Programming ==
=== TV Series ===
- Columbo (all seasons)
- Criminal Minds (all seasons)
- CSI: Vegas (all seasons)
- Dr. House (all seasons)
- FBI (all seasons)
- Inspector George Gently (all seasons)
- Kriminálka Anděl (all seasons)
- Law & Order: Special Victims Unit (all seasons)
- Medium (all seasons)
- Monk (all seasons)
- Murder, She Wrote (all seasons)
- Nikita (all seasons)
- Odznak Vysočina (all seasons)
- Person of Interest (all seasons)
- Sherlock Holmes (all seasons)
- SOKO Kitzbühel (all seasons)
- Specialisté (all seasons)
- The Mentalist (all seasons)
- Without a Trace (all seasons)

== Logo ==
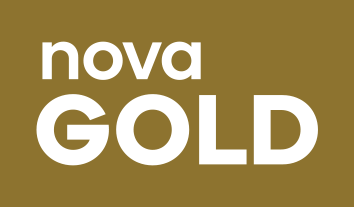
Nova Gold's logo from 2017 to 2025

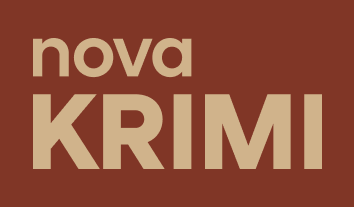
Nova Krimi's logo from 2025 to present
