= Senate district 54 – Znojmo =

Electoral district in the Czech Republic

54 – Znojmo
- inline Senate district of the Czech Republic

- The Znojmo district on a map
- Senator: Tomáš Třetina; TOP 09
- Region: South Moravia
- District: Znojmo; Brno-venkov
- Last election: 2026
- Next election: 2032

Senate district 54 – Znojmo is an electoral district of the Senate of the Czech Republic, located in the entirety of the Znojmo District and the southern part of the Brno-Country District. Since 2020, the Senator for the district is Tomáš Třetina for TOP 09.

== Senators ==
Year	Senator	Party
1996	Milan Špaček	KDU-ČSL
2002	Vladimír Železný	NEZ
2004	Milan Špaček	KDU-ČSL
2008	Marta Bayerová	KSČM
2014	Pavel Štohl	ČSSD
2020	Tomáš Třetina	TOP 09
2026	Tomáš Třetina	TOP 09

== Election results ==
=== 1996 ===
1996 Czech Senate election in Znojmo
Candidate	Party	1st round		2nd round	
Candidate	Party	Votes	%	Votes	%
Milan Špaček	KDU-ČSL	6 760	23,26	16 246	69,58
Drahoslava Šindelářová	ODS	6 847	23,56	7 103	30,42
Ludvík Herkle	KSČM	5 827	20,50	—	—
Miloslav Rychtecký	ČSSD	5 657	19,47	—	—
Jaroslav Šabata	Independent	1 367	4,70	—	—
Jan Kryčer	Independent	1 343	4,62	—	—
Miluše Říčková	NEZ	644	2,22	—	—
Pavel Hála	MSLK_96	616	2,12	—	—

=== 2002 ===
2002 Czech Senate election in Znojmo
Candidate	Party	1st round	
Candidate	Party	Votes	%
Vladimír Železný	NEZ	16 997	50,82
Milan Špaček	KDU-ČSL	6 106	18,25
Ludvík Herkle	KSČM	3 370	10,07
Oldřich Kraipl	ČSSD	2 837	8,48
Růžena Šalomonová	Independent	2 524	7,54
Jiří Moravec	Independent	1 127	3,37
Jaromír Morávek	KONS	480	1,43

=== 2004 (by-election) ===
2004 Czech Senate by-election in Znojmo
Candidate	Party	1st round		2nd round	
Candidate	Party	Votes	%	Votes	%
Milan Špaček	KDU-ČSL	4 995	28,37	6 734	53,31
Jaroslav M. Pařík	ODS	5 161	29,32	5 896	46,68
Augustin Forman	KSČM	4 735	26,90	—	—
Jindřich Laky	ČSSD	1 656	9,40	—	—
Anna Gigimovová	US-DEU	1 054	5,98	—	—

=== 2008 ===
2008 Czech Senate election in Znojmo
Candidate	Party	1st round		2nd round	
Candidate	Party	Votes	%	Votes	%
Marta Bayerová	KSČM	14 150	41,39	20 900	69,24
Petr Nezveda	ODS	5 903	17,27	9 283	30,75
Ladislav Skopal	ČSSD	5 788	16,93	—	—
Alois Vybíral	KDU-ČSL	4 610	13,48	—	—
Tomáš Rothröckl	SZ	2 034	5,95	—	—
Jiří Peřinka	SDŽ	664	1,94	—	—
Josef Molín	SNK ED	540	1,57	—	—
Jiří Stanislav	SZR, ČSNS 2005	491	1,43	—	—

=== 2014 ===
2014 Czech Senate election in Znojmo
Candidate	Party	1st round		2nd round	
Candidate	Party	Votes	%	Votes	%
Pavel Štohl	ČSSD	8 921	24,72	8 326	53,87
Jiří Němec	KDU-ČSL	6 697	18,55	7 127	46,12
Karel Podzimek	ODS	5 668	15,70	—	—
Marta Bayerová	KSČM	4 536	12,57	—	—
Petr Firbas	ANO 2011	3 347	9,27	—	—
Vladimír Železný	NEZ/DEM	3 267	9,05	—	—
Petr Krátký	Independent	3 199	8,86	—	—
Petr Michek	LEV 21, Moravané	450	1,24	—	—

=== 2020 ===
2020 Czech Senate election in Znojmo
Candidate	Party	1st round		2nd round	
Candidate	Party	Votes	%	Votes	%
Tomáš Třetina	TOP 09, ODS, STAN	9 172	30,37	10 478	54,57
Jan Grois	SOM	7 778	25,75	8 723	45,42
Martin Pavlík	ANO 2011	6 094	20,18	—	—
Pavel Kováčik	KSČM	2 281	7,55	—	—
Růžena Šalomonová	SPD	2 226	7,37	—	—
Bohumila Beranová	Independent	1 778	5,88	—	—
Vladimír Železný	Tricolour	868	2,87	—	—

=== 2026 ===
2026 Czech Senate election in Znojmo
Candidate	Party	1st round		2nd round	
Candidate	Party	Votes	%	Votes	%
Tomáš Třetina	TOP 09, ODS, STAN, KDU-ČSL, Pirates	14 328	35,55	12 422	63,67
Jiří Kyněra	ANO 2011	8 980	22,28	7 086	36,32
Jindřich Růžička	Independent	7 528	18,67	—	—
Petra Rédová Fajmonová	Stačilo!	4 749	11,78	—	—
Bohumila Beranová	HR	2 683	6,65	—	—
Pavel Černý	Přísaha	2 033	5,04	—	—
