= Podhradí (podcast) =

- Starring: Petr Pavel
- Country of origin: Czech Republic

Production
- Running time: 30 minutes

Original release
- Network: YouTube; Spotify
- Release: 22 March 2023

Podhradí is a podcast hosted by Michal Půr as he interviews Czech President Petr Pavel. First episode was released on 22 March 2023. Each episode is 30 minutes long. It is available on YouTube and Spotify. Author of the podcast is Michal Nýdrle who is part of Pavel's team. Podcast was criticised for choice of moderator who works in CNN Prima News and in a conservative server Info.cz. Some journalist stated that Pavel should have chosen a public media moderator. Left-wing social liberal server A2larm criticised choice as it considers Půr to be a "climatic desinformator."

Kateřina Vaníčková of iDNES.cz noted that the podcast resembles previous similar projects by previous Czech Presidents notably Hovory z Lán (Talks from Lány) with Václav Havel and A week with the President with Miloš Zeman.

Following the release of first episode the podcast for several months due to time issues as President Pavel had a busy schedule during his first 100 days in office. Půr stated for Hlídací Pes on 26 June 2023 that he submitted draft for second episode while term of shooting is negotiated. Second episode was eventually released on 7 September 2023.
