= A11 TV =

Czech television channel

Televize A11
- Country: Czech Republic

Ownership
- Owner: A 11 s.r.o.

History
- Launched: April 1, 2012
- Former names: regionalnitelevize.cz, Náš region TV

Links
- Website: https://tv.a11.cz/

Availability

Terrestrial
- DVB-T/T2: MUX 23 (FTA, Check local frequencies)

A11 TV is a Czech television channel that is part of A 11 media group. It originates from the local Regionální televize CZ (Regional Television CZ), which was renamed to Náš Region TV (Our Region TV) in October 2022. The channel received its current name in April 2023.

A11 TV runs a programme focused on regional news, entertainment, documentaries, talk shows, interviews and films. It was the first full-screen TV to broadcast films Happy by Eva Toulová, Hunters and Victims by Marcus Tran, Falling Tears by Michaela Everitt, Sunrise Supervising by Pavel Göbl and Voda, čo ma drží nad vodou by Tomáš Magnusek. It is distributed terrestrially via the DVB-T2 Multiplex of 23 Czech Radiocommunications, via a number of operators, for example T-Mobile, Vodafone, on satellite or via IPTV. The headquarters of the television is in the Košířská brány building, Prague, where the newsroom of the print titles of the A 11 media group, the television newsroom and the newly built studios are integrated.

== Program diagram ==
A11 bases its program schedule primarily on news from Czech regions. Every weekday it broadcasts a moderated news session A11 Zprávy, A11 rozhovor, which feature interviews with personalities of Czech social, cultural and political life or the program Cesta na Olymp.

The evening program schedule is complemented by Czech and foreign films, documentaries (mainly by the Slovak director Pavel Barabáš), a talk show by the actor and director Tomáš Magnusek. In the early evening, the program Dobrý večer s A11, moderated by Michael Viktořík, Vlasta Korec, Hanka Kynychová, Bára Fišerová and Pepa Melen, is on. It includes the programs Ve formě s A11, Vaření or Polibte si preference with Zuzana Bubílková. She also took over the moderation of the show Na Palici. Furthermore, Vlasta Korec moderates the competition Vtipkování and celebrities show their favorite places in the program Tady jsme se narodili. Journalists Jan Tuna and Josef Klíma also have programs on A11 TV.

== Original programming ==
Television A11 broadcasts a number of programs of its own creation and adapted programs. The main ones include:

- Dobrý večer s A11 - an early-evening entertainment program that A11 broadcasts from 5:00 p.m. to 9:00 p.m., featuring interviews with well-known personalities and personalities from political and social life. Moderators are, for example, Vlasta Korec, Hanka Kynychová, Bára Fišarová, Josef Melen or Michael Viktořík.
- Zločin jak ho pomatuji - a program about crimes of the past moderated by Josef Klíma
- Polibte mi preference - a satirical show by glossator Zuzana Bubílková
- Tomáš Magnusek na cestách - talk show of the actor and director Tomáš Magnusek, who invites well-known personalities to his show
- Byznys na vrcholu - business interviews of entrepreneur Pavel Sehnal
- Jedlíci na cestách - a program focused purely on national cuisines, the aim of which is to show people the basic dishes that should definitely not be missed when traveling.
- Pan Kmín uvádí - a roadshow of presser and gourmet Karel Jonák around the regions of our republic.
- Kutilové - a program for do-it-yourselfers
- Mladý svět - a fun show moderated by the editor-in-chief of Mladý svět magazine, moderator Bára Hlaváčková and a star guest
- Rychlovka z kuchyně - a program about cooking with chef Martin Kortous

== A11 TV plans for the future ==
The A11 media group has shown its interest in continuing to expand its portfolio of television channels. It has announced plans to launch a new sports channel, A11 Sport, in collaboration with Perinvest, which holds a sports TV licence, and has also expressed interest in the rights to the football Fortuna Liga. The channel was renamed Sporty TV before launch.

== See also ==
- Television in the Czech Republic
