= Profesionálové =

- Genre: Comedy
- Starring: Jiří Bábek; Josef Polášek
- Country of origin: Czech Republic
- Original language: Czech
- No. of seasons: 2
- No. of episodes: 27

Production
- Running time: 44 minutes

Original release
- Network: TV Barrandov
- Release: 13 January 2009 – 15 December 2010

Profesionálové (Professionals) is a Czech television sitcom that was broadcast in 2009-2010 by TV Barrandov. It is a remake of the Slovak series of the same name. The Czech version, TV Barrandov's first own series, which began its broadcast in January 2009, was cancelled in March 2009 after only eleven episodes, although the television planned to shoot at least 26 episodes. In 2010, the project was revived and a second series of 16 episodes with a partially different cast was made.

== Plot ==
The series is about a small police station headed by Captain Petrželka, who is assisted by three younger policemen and speaker Kosinová. He deals with the various cases that this group has to solve, while the retired mobster Gregor, now a pub owner, is also an important person.

== Cast ==
- Jiří Bábek as Captain Mirek Petrželka
- Josef Polášek as Lieutenant Libor Buček
- Jiří Vyorálek as Second Lieutenant Alexandr Vyšný-Riefenstahl (Season 1)
- Pavel Liška as Second Lieutenant Alexandr Vyšný-Riefenstahl (Season 2)
- Petr Jeništa as First Lieutenant František Popelka (Season 1)
- Matěj Hádek as First Lieutenant František Popelka (Season 2)
- Marika Procházková as Second Lieutenant Skarlet Kosinová
- Alexej Pyško as Josef "Pepe" Gregor (Season 1)
- Petr Čtvrtníček as Josef "Pepe" Gregor (Season 2)

== Reception ==
After the broadcast of the first episode, the series received the position of the worst series of all time on the list of the fan Czech-Slovak film database with a rating of 2%.
