= Premiér =

- Genre: Comedy
- Written by: Jaromír Soukup
- Directed by: Marek Benda
- Starring: Jaromír Soukup
- Country of origin: Czech Republic
- Original language: Czech
- No. of seasons: 1
- No. of episodes: 9

Production
- Running time: 20 minutes

Original release
- Network: TV Barrandov
- Release: 9 October – 22 October 2019

Premiér (Prime Minister) is a Czech television sitcom that was broadcast in 2019 by TV Barrandov. The series deals with the office of the government, and the title role of the newly elected Czech Prime Minister Pavel Diviš was played by the owner and director of the television Jaromír Soukup himself, who presented and moderated nine other Barrandov programs at the time of the series premiere. The first episode premiered on October 9, 2019. A total of nine episodes were created, the last of which was shown on October 22, 2019. The regular footage of the piece was 20 minutes, the creators of the show and the individual actors were not mentioned in the credits of the series.

== Plot ==
As the winner of elections Pavel Diviš is appointed by President Miloš Zeman as the new Czech Prime Minister. As prime minister, he must solve the government's everyday problems.

== Cast ==
- Jaromír Soukup as Pavel Diviš, Prime Minister
- Šárka Sedláková as Marcela Nováková, Prime Minister's secretary
- Čestmír Řanda jr. as Ivan, Prime Minister's driver and bodyguard

== Reception ==
After the broadcast of the first episode, the series received the position of the worst series of all time on the list of the fan Czech-Slovak film database with a rating of 2%.
