= Nova Sport (Czech Republic and Slovakia) =

Czech television station

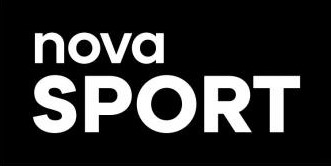
- Country: Czech Republic and Slovakia

Programming
- Picture format: 16:9 1080i (HDTV)

Ownership
- Owner: CME
- Sister channels: TV Nova; Nova Cinema; Nova Action; Nova Fun; Nova Krimi; Nova Lady; Nova International

History
- Launched: 4 October 2008
- Former names: Galaxie Sport (2002–2008)

Links
- Website: TN.cz Sport

Nova Sport is a set of 6 channels focused on sports. They were launched from 4 October 2008 to 29 February 2024.

Nova Sport 1 is the first of Czech pay-TV channel the Nova Sport channels, first broadcast on 4 October 2008. It focuses primarily on mainstream sports and broadcasts sporting events and sport-related programming in the Czech Republic and Slovakia. It has broadcasting licenses for major sport leagues and events including the National Hockey League (NHL). Nova Sport also produces various weekly sports shows and magazines, as well as locally produced daily sports news programs in the Czech Republic and Slovakia.

Nova Sport 2 started broadcasting on 5 September 2015. It focuses on popular sports that have not yet been broadcast to a similar extent, including the National Basketball Association (NBA), Darts tournaments, Bellator MMA and also international rugby.

Nova Sport 3 started broadcasting on 13 August 2021. It received a broadcasting license on 1 July 2021. It has been broadcasting in Full HD since launch. The station broadcasts soccer matches from UEFA Champions League, Bundesliga, La Liga, Serie A, UEFA Super Cup, DFL-SuperCup and Coupe de France. The station is distributed on satellite platforms, cable and IPTV television. Other distribution channels are also planned for the future.

Nova Sport 4 started broadcasting on 13 August 2021, the same day as Nova Sport 3. Like Nova Sport 3, it received a broadcasting license on 1 July 2021 and has been broadcasting in Full HD since launch. The station offers the same programs as Nova Sport 3. The station is distributed on satellite platforms, cable and IPTV television. Other distribution channels are also planned for the future.

Nova Sport 5 started broadcasting on 29 February 2024. The station broadcasts Formula 1, Formula 2, Formula 3, F1 Academy and Porsche Supercup races. The station's team of F1 presenters consists of Števo Eisele, Josef Král, Pavel Fabry and Karolína Bulisová. The station will also offer broadcasts of WorldSBK and football matches of the Bundesliga, La Liga, Ligue 1 and Serie A. On 16 February 2025, it was announced that the Nascar Cup Series, Nascar Truck Series, and Nascar Euro Series would be available on this station. The station is offered by O2 Czech Republic, Telly, Vodafone and T-Mobile, negotiations are ongoing with other distributors.

Nova Sport 6 started broadcasting on 29 February 2024. The station focuses on motorsport, broadcasting MotoGP, WorldSBK or the FIM women's series. The station also offers UFC and soccer matches from Bundesliga, La Liga, Ligue 1 and Serie A. On 16 February 2025, it was announced that the Nascar Cup Series, Nascar Truck Series, and Nascar Euro Series would be available on this station. The station is offered by O2 Czech Republic, Telly, Vodafone and T-Mobile, negotiations are ongoing with other distributors.

== Sport competitions ==
=== Soccer ===
- FIFA Club World Cup
- UEFA Champions League
- UEFA Europa League
- UEFA Conference League
- Copa Libertadores
- EFL Cup
- FA Cup
- La Liga
- La Liga 2
- Coupe de France
- Ligue 1
- Ligue 2
- Bundesliga
- 2. Bundesliga
- DFB-Pokal
- Niké Liga

=== Basketball ===
- Basketball Champions League
- NBA

=== Handball ===
- Handball-Bundesliga

=== Rugby ===
- Premiership Rugby
- Women's Six Nations

=== Ice hockey ===
- NHL
- PWHL

=== Floorball ===
- Swedish Super League

=== Motorsport ===
- Formula One
- FIA Formula 2 Championship
- FIA Formula 3 Championship
- F1 Academy
- Porsche Supercup
- MotoGP
- Moto2
- Moto3
- NASCAR Cup Series
- NASCAR Truck Series
- NASCAR Euro Series
- WorldSBK
- WorldSSP
- WorldSPP300

=== Kickboxing ===
- WBC

=== Mixed Martial Arts ===
- Bellator MMA
- KSW
- PFL

=== Darts ===
- Premier League Darts

=== Pool ===
- World Pool Masters

=== Equestrianism ===
- Longines Global Champions Tour
Channel logos

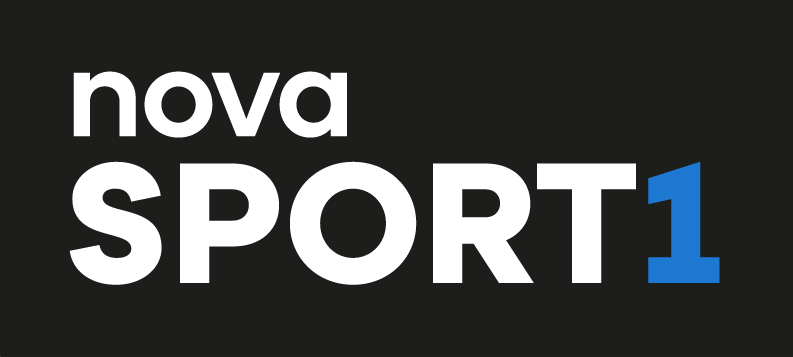
Nova Sport 1's current logo

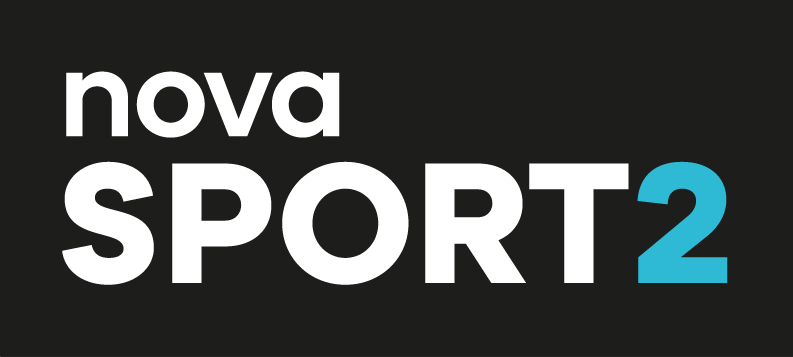
Nova Sport 2's current logo

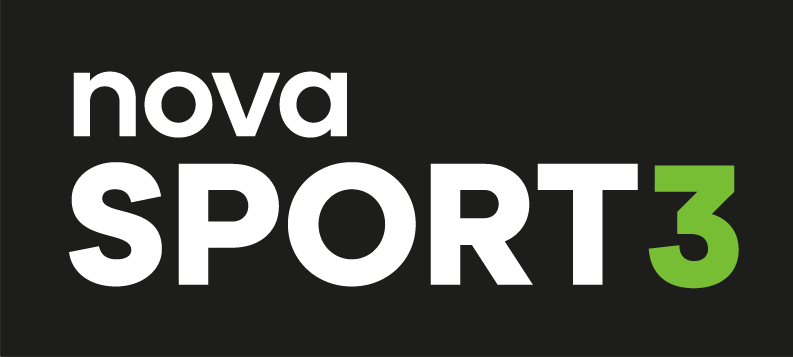
Nova Sport 3's current logo

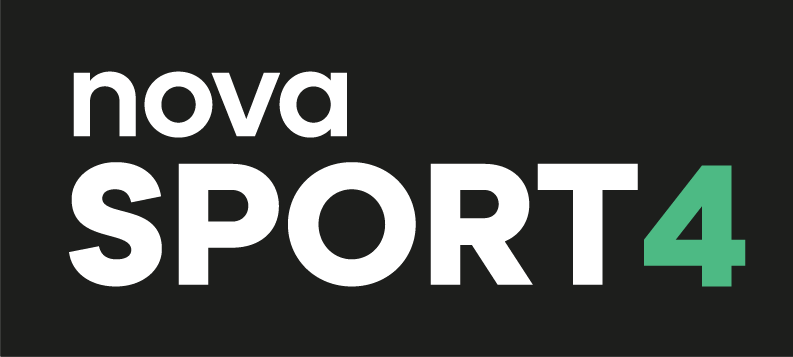
Nova Sport 4's current logo

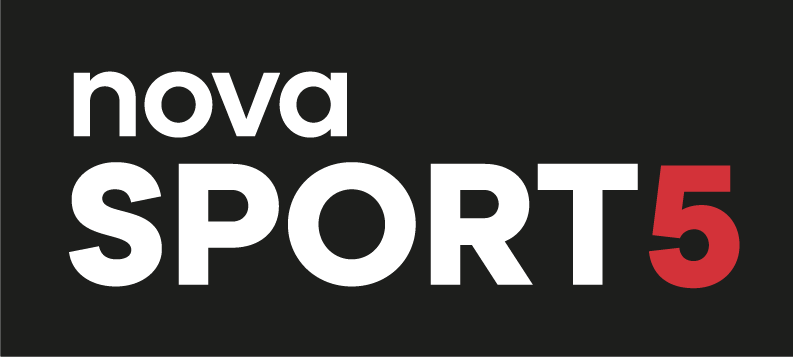
Nova Sport 5's current logo

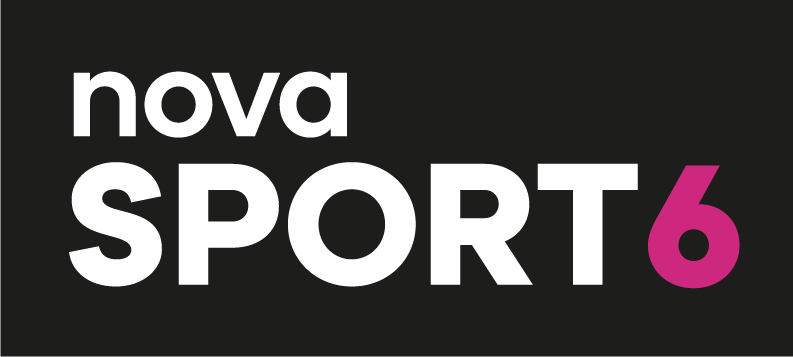
Nova Sport 6's current logo
