= Vladimír Železný =

Czech businessman and politician

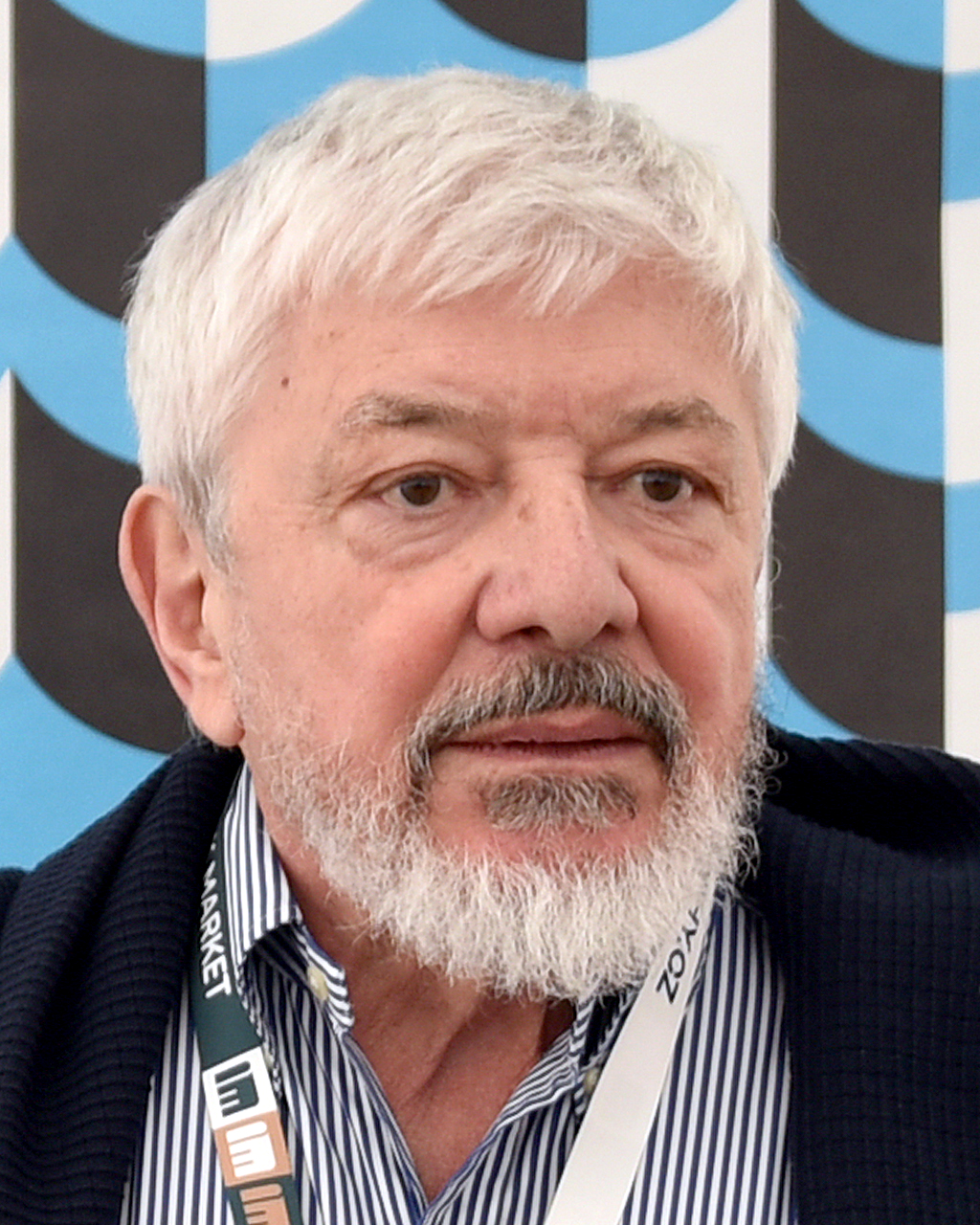
- Železný in 2023

Senator of the Czech Republic (Znojmo circuit)
- In office 2002–2004
- Preceded by: Milan Špaček
- Succeeded by: Milan Špaček

Member of the European Parliament
- In office 2004–2009

Personal details
- Born: 3 March 1945 (age 81) Samara, Russian SFSR, Soviet Union (now Russia)
- Party: Libertas.cz (2009- ) Independent Democrats (Czech Republic) (2004-2009)
- Spouse(s): Marta Železná-Davouze; Konstancie Železná
- Children: 4
- Education: Charles University
- Profession: Publicist

Vladimír Železný (born 3 March 1945) is a Czech businessman and politician. He was the first CEO of TV NOVA, a popular Czech television station and was a member of the European Parliament between 2004 and 2009. As a media mogul with political influence, he has been compared to Rupert Murdoch and Silvio Berlusconi. He was convicted of tax evasion in 2007.

== Early life and media career ==
Born to a Jewish family, Železný made headlines in 1968, at the age of 23, when he broadcast in defiance of orders pictures of Russian tanks driving through Prague during the Warsaw Pact invasion of Czechoslovakia.

In 1993 he applied with five others for a license to broadcast a private television channel to show classical music, cultural programmes and current affairs. He obtained a €140m investment from the American firm, Central European Media Enterprises (CME) to fund the enterprise. Due to the Czech Media Council's rules against foreign ownership, the license was granted to a company controlled by Železný - CET21 - which, with the legal assistance of Miroslav Šipovič signed a licensing agreement with a joint venture partly owned by CME. In February 1994 he launched TV NOVA which became the most popular network, although it was criticised as undermining the cultural tradition of Czechs.

In 1999 CET21 terminated the licensing agreement, effectively seizing control of the station and making CME's investment worthless. Subsequently, some 20 suits started in front of the Czech courts and international tribunals. While the CME (at the time incorporated in Netherlands and controlled by American national Ronald Lauder) started UNCITRAL arbitration proceedings against the Czech Republic (in Stockholm) under the Bilateral investment treaty between the Czech Republic and Netherlands, Ronald Lauder himself started UNCITRAL arbitration proceedings against the Czech Republic (in London) under the Bilateral investment treaty between the Czech Republic and the United States. While the London tribunal dismissed the claim by Lauder, the Stockholm tribunal, effectively dealing with the same issue, found the Czech Republic liable for not protecting the CME's investment in the Czech Republic and awarded CME damages of $270 million, which were eventually paid from taxpayers' money. Under a different arbitration award, Železný was to pay damages of $23 million. CME also eventually regained control of the channel.

From November 2013 to March 2014 he was the CEO of TV Barrandov.

== Political career ==
In 2002, Železný was elected to the Czech Senate for the Znojmo circuit. Analysts said he selected the seat based on the high ratings of TV Nova and high rates of unemployment and said he was "widely suspected" of seeking election only to secure parliamentary immunity.

In 2004 he was elected to the European Parliament. He founded the Independent Democrats (Nezávislí demokraté) in 2005 and was elected its chairman. In 2006 he unsuccessfully sought election to the Chamber of Deputies.

In 2008 he told Prague Radio he was a "fierce eurosceptic" and said the European Union was "an over-regulated environment which strongly resembles what we know from our communist past" In 2009 he launched Libertas.cz.

== Criminal activities ==
Following his 1999 split with investors, Železný was suspected of selling property and making a speculative agreement with a Liechtenstein company to avoid paying his debt to CME. In 2011 the High Court in Prague acquitted him of the charges.

In 2001 Železný was publicly arrested and charged with tax evasion and defrauding creditors in connection with the Nova company. In 2003 the Senate voted to lift his immunity to allow the police to investigate and in 2005 the European Parliament followed suit. Later he was acquitted of the charges. In 2007 he was found guilty of tax evasion in connection to paintings he had imported in 1998, fined €250,000 and given a two-year suspended jail sentence with a two-year probation. The verdict was later upheld by the High Court in Prague.

== See also ==
- CME/Lauder v. Czech Republic
