= Barrandov Krimi =

Czech television channel

Krimi Barrandov
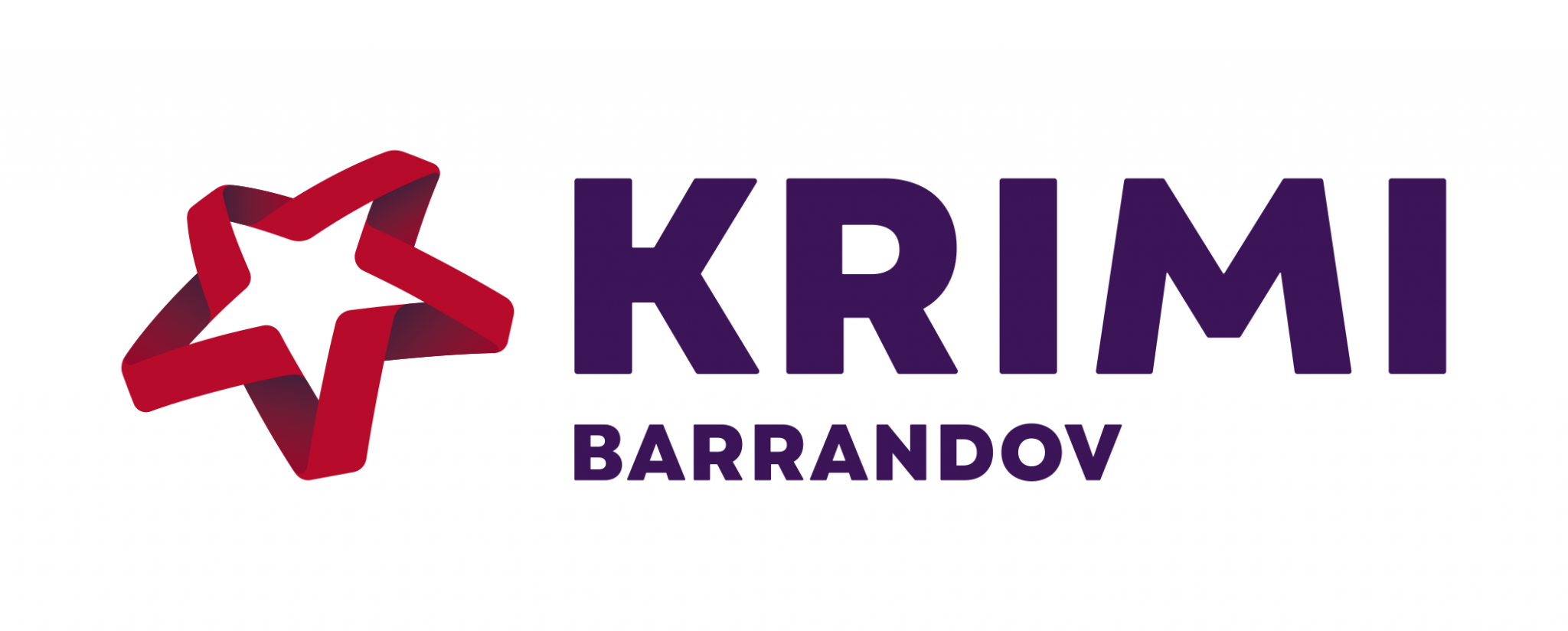
- Country: Czech Republic
- Broadcast area: Czech Republic and Worldwide
- Headquarters: Prague

Programming
- Language: Czech
- Picture format: 16:9/4:3 576i (SDTV); 720p/1080i (HDTV)

Ownership
- Sister channels: TV Barrandov; Barrandov Kino

History
- Launched: 16 May 2015
- Former names: Barrandov Plus (2015-2019)

Availability

Terrestrial
- DVB-T/T2: MUX 23 (FTA, Check local frequencies)

Barrandov Krimi (formerly Barrandov Plus) is the third Television channel of the TV Barrandov group. It started airing on 16 May 2015. It is the next launched channel of the TV Barrandov group after the Barrandov Kino channel, which started broadcasting a month earlier.

== Name change ==
On February 1, 2019, the name of the channel changed from Barrandov Plus to Barrandov Krimi. The program composition did not change significantly.

== Program ==
During the day, the channel primarily broadcasts TV Barrandov's own creations, such as the programs Soudkyně Barbara, Soudce Alexandr, Odvolací soud, 112, Nehoda není náhoda but also foreign crime series Pfarrer Braun.

== Broadcasting ==
Barrandov Krimi also broadcasts in Multiplex 23. Also on Skylink in the Digital package, in UPC – prefix 152 (Barrandov Krimi HD position 16, SD version 165) and O2 TV in position 106.

== Logo history ==
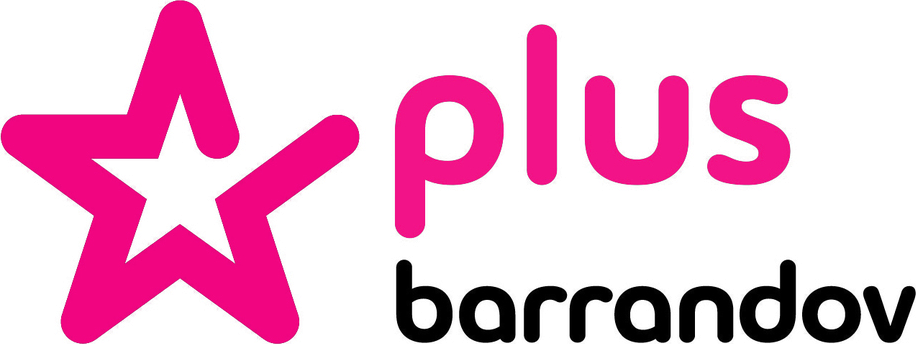
Barrandov Plus logo from 2015 to 2019

First logo Barrandov Krimi from 2019 to 2025
