= Jiří Hodač =

Czech media manager

4th Director General of Česká televize
- In office 20 December 2000 – 12 January 2001
- Preceded by: Dušan Chmelíček

News Director of Česká televize
- In office 2000 – 14 August 2000

Personal details
- Education: Charles University
- Alma mater: Charles University (Journalism)
- Occupation: Media manager, journalist
- Known for: Czech TV crisis

Jiří Hodač is a Czech media manager, best known for his short tenure as Director General of Česká televize between December 2000 and January 2001, which spanned the start of the Czech TV crisis. Hodač took up his position as Director General on 20 December 2000 and resigned on 12 January 2001, citing poor health.

Hodač studied journalism at Charles University in Prague. He started working for BBC Radio in 1989. He worked as News Director at Česká televize, but his term lasted for less than four months; he resigned on 14 August 2000. Hodač became the fourth Director General of Česká televize on 20 December 2000, taking over from outgoing director Dušan Chmelíček. After being taken ill in early January 2001, Hodač announced his resignation for medical reasons just a few days later.
