= Specialisté =

- Genre: Action, Crime drama
- Directed by: Peter Bebjak; Peter Magát; Lukáš Hanulák; Dan Wlodarczyk; Michal Blaško; Braňo Mišík; Róbert Šveda; Roman Valentko; Daniel Rihák; Roman Fabián; Matúš Ryšán; Ondrej Hraška; Zuzana Marianková
- Starring: David Prachař; Marek Adamczyk; Zuzana Kajnarová
- Country of origin: Czech Republic
- Original languages: Czech; Slovak
- No. of seasons: 11
- No. of episodes: 241

Production
- Running time: 45 minutes

Original release
- Network: TV Nova
- Release: 2017 – present

Specialisté (Specialists) is a Czech action crime series about a four-member team of police investigators focusing primarily on murders. The first season of the series premiered on TV Nova on January 16, 2017. The series has maintained a high viewership since the beginning of the broadcast and continues in the spring of 2025.

== Cast and characters ==
- David Prachař as plk. Mgr. Pavel Vondráček
- Patricie Solaříková as kpt. Mgr. Ema Králová
- Zuzana Kajnarová as kpt. Mgr. Zuzana Koutná
- Martin Dejdar as mjr. Mgr. Josef Strouhal
- Jiří Hána as kpt. Mgr. Martin Kovář
- Eva Leimbergerová as kpt. JUDr. Mgr. Jana Šafářová
- Jacob Erftemeijer as kpt. Mgr. Tomáš Beran
- Jakub Štáfek as kpt. Bc. Lukáš Panenka
- Vojtěch Vodochodský as kpt. Bc. Petr Hájek
- Eliška Křenková as prap. Monika Švarcová
