= Swedish Super League =

Swedish Super League or Svenska Superligan (SSL) may refer to

- Swedish Super League (men's floorball)
- Swedish Super League (women's floorball)
