= Nova Cinema (Czech Republic) =

Czech television channel

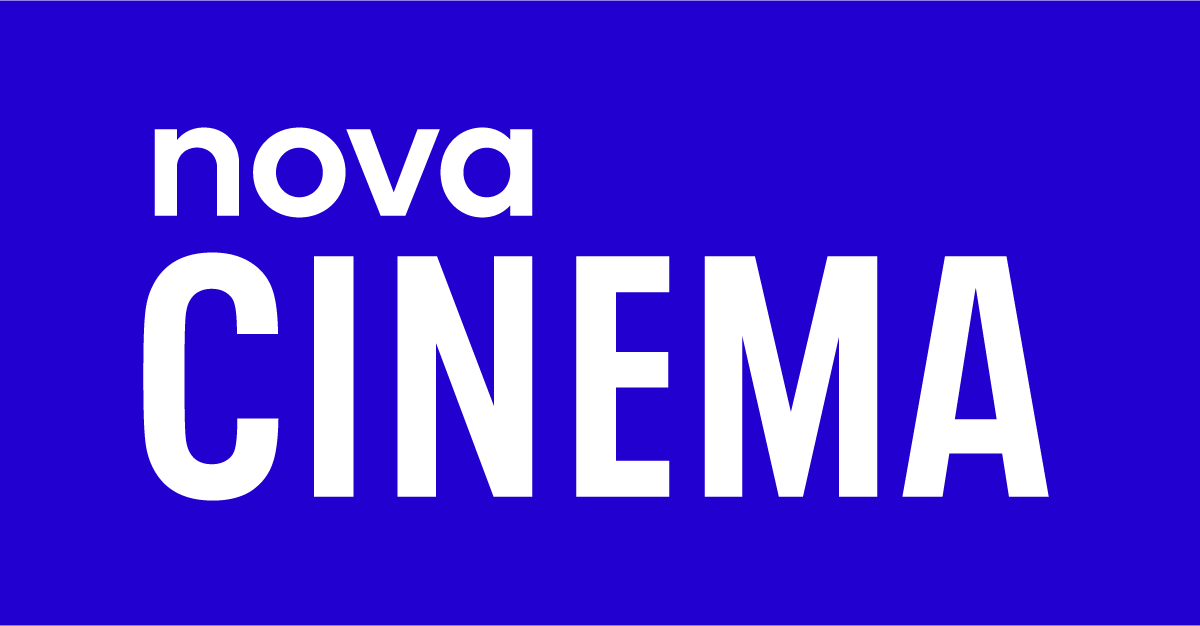
- Country: Czech Republic
- Headquarters: Prague

Programming
- Language: Czech
- Picture format: 4:3/16:9 (480p/720p, HDTV)

Ownership
- Owner: CME
- Sister channels: TV Nova; Nova Action; Nova Fun; Nova Krimi; Nova Lady; Nova Sport 1 Nova Sport 2 Nova Sport 3 Nova Sport 4 Nova Sport 5 Nova Sport 6 Nova International

History
- Launched: 1 December 2007

Availability

Terrestrial
- DVB-T/T2: MUX 23 (FTA)

Streaming media
- Nova.cz: Watch live (Czech only)

Nova Cinema is a Czech free digital television channel in the Czech Republic, owned and operated by CME, and a sister channel of TV Nova.

The channel broadcasts various films (thematically categorized from genres: crime, action, drama, comedy, horror, thriller to romantic, sci-fi, family or Czech films, fantasy), or showbiz shows like Red Carpet Reporter ("Hvězdy červeného koberce") and Hollywood Reporter ("Hollywoodský zpravodaj").

The channel is available through satellite, cable, IPTV and since 15 December 2008 in DVB-T multiplex 2.

== Films ==
=== Action, Crime, Horror, Sci-Fi, Thriller ===
- Detective Pikachu
- Elektra
- Godzilla
- Guardians of the Galaxy
- Hancock
- Inferno
- Iron Man
- Jumper
- Jurassic World
- Killing season
- The Great Wall
- Troy
- A History of Violence
- Inherent Vice
- Joker
- Annabelle: Creation
- Annabelle
- Final Destination 3
- Halloween
- It
- It Chapter Two
- Rest Stop
- Rest Stop: Don't Look Back
- Texas Chainsaw 3D
- The Exorcist
- The Lazarus Effect
- The Nun
- The Unborn
- The Wolfman
- Wolves at the Door
- Black Panther
- Blade Runner
- Green Lantern
- Guardians of the Galaxy Vol. 2
- Matrix
- Matrix Reloaded
- Matrix Revolutions
- Midnight Special
- Tomorrowland
- X-Men
- Angels & Demons
- Contagion
- Instinct
- Jaws
- Jaws 2
- Nocturnal Animals
- Wild Things: Foursome

=== Adventures, Western ===
- G-Force
- King Kong
- Superman Returns
- White Fang
- High Plains Drifter
- The Salvation
- Unforgiven

=== Family, Comedy ===
- Cinderella
- American Pie Presents: Band Camp
- Analyze This
- Bean
- Bring It On: Fight to the Finish
- Bring It On: In It to Win It
- Bring It On: Worldwide Cheersmack
- Casper
- Crazy, Stupid Love
- For a Good Time, Call...
- Jack Frost
- Kangaroo Jack
- Problem Child
- Problem Child 2
- Scooby-Doo
- Scooby-Doo 2: Monsters Unleashed
- Sisters
- Ted 2

=== Drama, Romance, Musical, Fantasy ===
- Argo
- American History X
- Anna Karenina
- Catwoman
- Cinderella Man
- Coach Carter
- Eyes Wide Shut
- Flipped
- Scarface
- The Fan
- The Finest Hours
- La La Land
- Aladdin
- Constantine
- Coraline
- Maleficent: Mistress of Evil

=== Animation Films ===
- A Bug's Life
- A Christmas Carol
- Antz
- Brave
- Brother Bear
- Captain Underpants: The First Epic Movie
- Cars
- Cars 2
- Cars 3
- Chicken Little
- Coco
- DC Super Hero Girls: Legends of Atlantis
- Despicable Me 2
- Finding Dory
- Frozen
- Frozen 2
- Happy Feet
- Home
- Incredibles 2
- Legend of the Guardians: The Owls of Ga'Hoole
- Moana
- Monsters University
- ParaNorman
- Peter Pan
- Peter Rabbit
- Planes: Fire & Rescue
- Ralph Breaks the Internet
- Return to Never Land
- Teen Titans Go! To the Movies
- The Adventures of Rocky and Bullwinkle
- The Ant Bully
- The Boss Baby
- The Jungle Book 2
- The Lego Ninjago Movie
- The Polar Express
- The Princess and the Frog
- The Wild
- Treasure Planet
- Up
- Wreck-It Ralph

=== Czech Films ===
- Kajínek

== Programming ==
=== Series ===
- Cold Case
- Dr. House
- Elementary
- Monk
- The Mentalist

== Logos ==
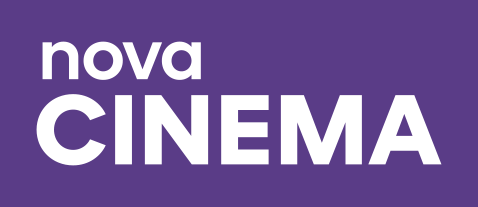
Nova Cinema's third logo from 2017 to 2024
