= Z1 TV =

Z1
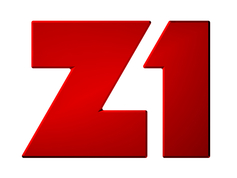
- Country: Czech Republic

Ownership
- Owner: J&T Group

History
- Launched: 1 June 2008; 17 years ago
- Closed: 24 January 2011; 14 years ago

Links
- Website: www.z1tv.cz

Availability

Terrestrial
- Terrestrial: Channel 7

Z1 TV was a Czech television news channel owned and operated by J&T Group, broadcasting between 2008 and 2011.

Z1 was the first Czech private 24-hour news channel. From September 2009, it focused on finance, economic and business news and provided the only continuous business news service in the Czech Republic.

Z1 broadcast live every weekday between 7am and 11pm. Its business and finance news service was supplemented by business talk shows and a daily interview program with high-profile guests. The rest of the program consisted of acquired documentaries and other features. Over the weekend, Z1 broadcast documentaries and lifestyle programs.

Z1 broadcast over DVB-T, DVB-S, DVB-C and IPTV. It could also be viewed online and on mobile phones through a streaming video application. In cooperation with T-Mobile Czech Republic, Z1 provided daily news SMS and MMS updates to subscribers.

Z1 was operated by První zpravodajská a.s., holder of a license for digital terrestrial television broadcasting in the Czech Republic. První zpravodajská a.s. was owned by J&T Finance Group, one of the leading investment firms in the Central and Eastern Europe region and Russia with diverse portfolio of assets in finance, banking, energy, utilities, real estate and corporate services.

Some of the station's anchors were Jan Zika and Ivana Šalomonová.
