= Óčko Black =

Czech music television channel

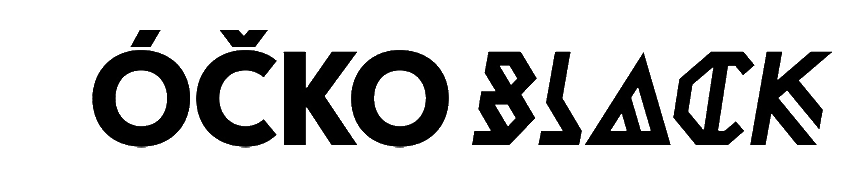
- Country: Czech Republic
- Headquarters: Prague

Programming
- Language: Czech

Ownership
- Owner: Stanice O
- Sister channels: Óčko; Óčko Expres; Óčko Star

History
- Launched: 5 February 2019

Links
- Website: https://ocko.tv/

Availability

Terrestrial
- DVB-T/T2: Regional Network 12 (FTA); Regional Network 8 (FTA)

Óčko Black is a Czech music television channel.

The channel is operated by Station O. Decision to grant a license by the Council for Radio and Television Broadcasting was issued on 4 December 2018. Óčko Black focuses on the genres of hip-hop, soul, rock and roll, etc. The channel started on 5 February 2019. The target group of the station is viewers aged 15-30, primarily city dwellers. It is distributed to paid operators on cable, satellite or via IPTV. It is also available on terrestrial broadcasts, on Regional Network 12 and Regional Network 8.
