= A week with the President =

- Starring: Miloš Zeman
- Country of origin: Czech Republic

Production
- Running time: 25 minutes

Original release
- Network: TV Barrandov
- Release: 16 March 2017 – 9 January 2020

A week with the President was a Czech Journalist television program broadcast by TV Barrandov. The first episode was broadcast on 16 March 2017. It was presented by Petr Kolář and Alex Mynářová, as they interviewed Czech president Miloš Zeman, who commented on current events. It quickly became one of the most viewed journalistic programs in the Czech Republic. The program was considered part of Zeman's re-election campaign for the 2018 presidential election. It was discontinued in January 2020.
