= Barrandov Kino =

Czech television channel

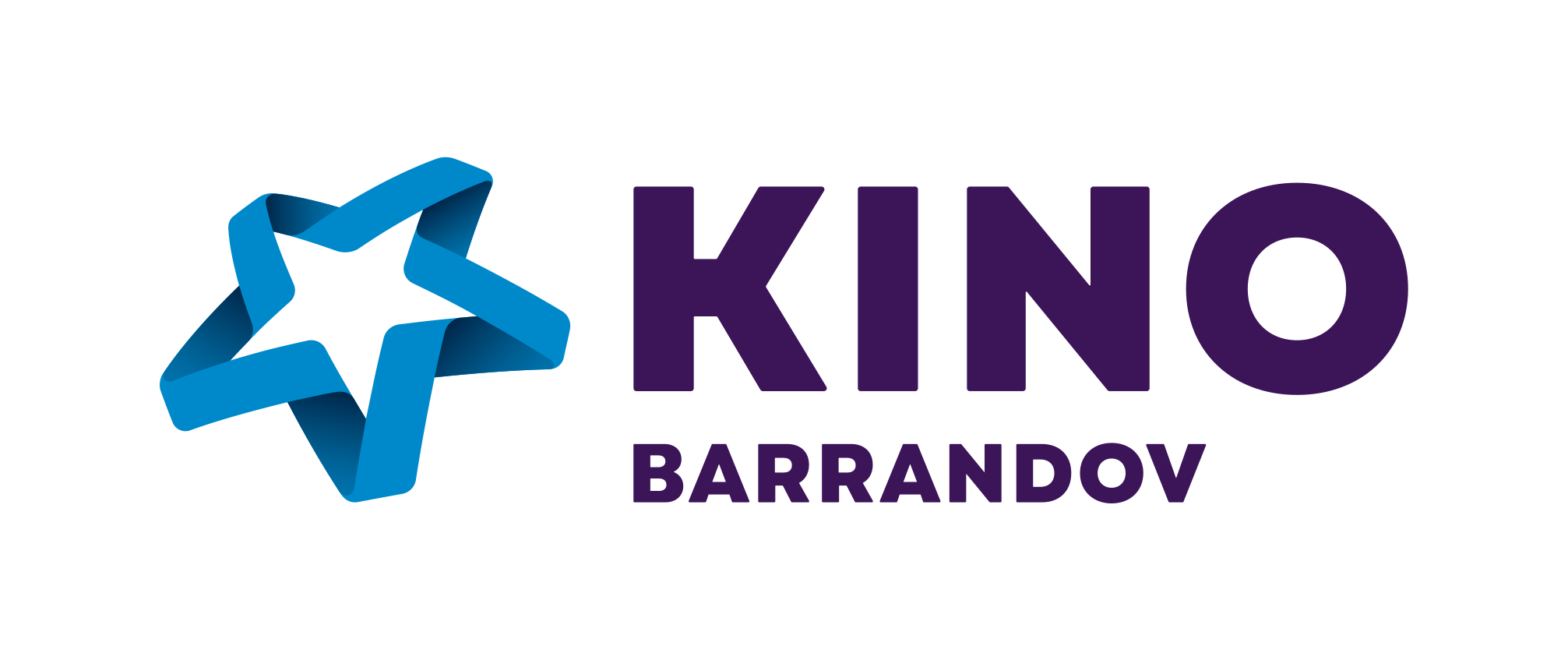
- Country: Czech Republic
- Broadcast area: Czech Republic and Worldwide
- Headquarters: Prague

Programming
- Language: Czech
- Picture format: 16:9 576i (SDTV); 720p/1080i (HDTV)

Ownership
- Sister channels: TV Barrandov; Barrandov Krimi

History
- Launched: 18 April 2015
- Former names: Kino Barrandov (2015-2025)

Links
- Website: https://www.barrandov.tv/

Availability

Terrestrial
- DVB-T2: MUX 23 (FTA)

Streaming media
- Skylink: 39

Barrandov Kino is the second channel of TV Barrandov group. The channel began broadcasting on 18 April 2015.

Barrandov Kino is a thematic program focused primarily on acquisition film and serial production. The program is broadcast 24 hours a day in Czech language. The license for DVB-T and satellite broadcasting was granted on 17 February 2015.

== Program ==
The channel broadcasts programs of its own creation, such as Nebezpečné vztahy, Jak to dopadlo!? or Co bude dnes k večeři?

== Broadcast ==
Barrandov Kino broadcasts in Multiplex 23. Also in the cable network UPC and PODA, in IPTV O2TV and also in the Skylink satellite service.

== Logo history ==
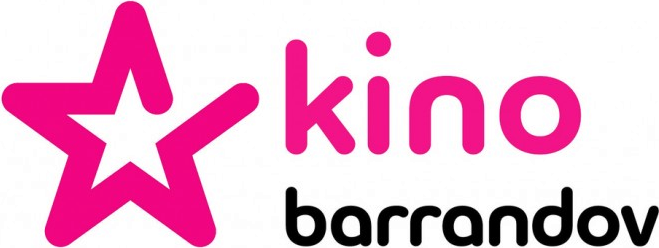
Kino Barrandov logo from 2015 to 2025
