= Nova Action (Czech TV channel) =

Czech television channel

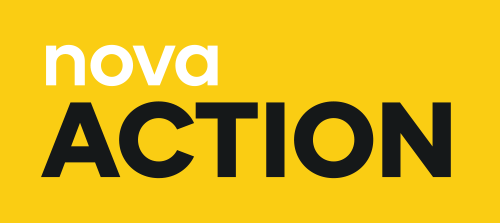
- Country: Czech Republic
- Broadcast area: Nationally and Slovakia
- Headquarters: Barrandov, Prague

Programming
- Language: Czech
- Picture format: 16:9 1080i (HDTV)

Ownership
- Owner: CME
- Sister channels: TV Nova; Nova Cinema; Nova Fun; Nova Krimi; Nova Lady; Nova Sport 1 Nova Sport 2 Nova Sport 3 Nova Sport 4 Nova Sport 5 Nova Sport 6 Nova International

History
- Launched: 14 July 2012
- Former names: TV Fanda (2012-2017)

Links
- Webcast: Watch live (Czech Republic only)

Availability

Terrestrial
- DVB-T/T2: MUX 24 (FTA)

Nova Action is the second niche channel aimed at young, active men in the Czech Republic and the main competitor for MTG's channel Prima Cool. The channel, which launched on July 14, 2012, is owned by Central European Media Enterprises. Its 18-hour daily broadcasts currently reach approximately 95% of the country's 10.5 million people.

Nova Action showcases top foreign series, shows, documentaries, sporting events, and movies that appeal to young male viewers.

The channel is also extending its programming to included highly rated foreign titles as well as gradually delivered, locally produced content relevant to its audience.

== TV series & miniseries ==
- Chicago P.D. (all seasons)
- Elementary (all seasons)
- Alarm for Cobra 11 - The Highway Police (all seasons)
- NCIS (all seasons)
- Person of Interest (all seasons)
- Without a Trace (all seasons)

== Documentary series ==
- Storage Wars
- Auction Kings
- Pawn Stars
- Shark Tank
- Dragons'Den
- Titan Games
- Mayday
- Shipping Wars
- Diesel Brothers
- Counting Cars
- Declassified
- American Restoration
- American Pickers
- Border Security: Australia's Front Line
- Ice Road Rescue

== Sporting events ==
- NHL
- NBA
- Ligue 1
- Ligue 2
- DFB-Pokal
- MotoGP
- Superbike World Championship
- Premiership Rugby
- Basketball Champions League
- Six Nations Championship
- Handball-Bundesliga
- UFC

== Logo ==
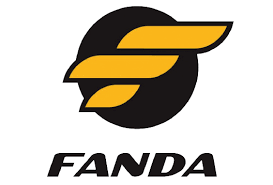
Fanda's logo from 2012 to 2017

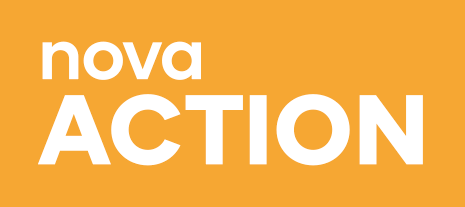
Nova Action's first logo from 2017 to 2021
