= Óčko Star =

Czech music television channel

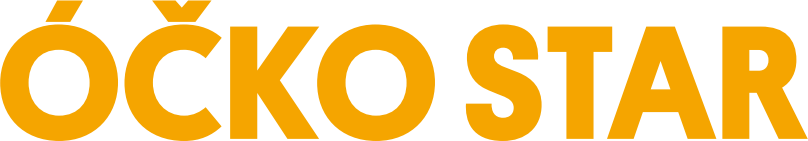
- Country: Czech Republic
- Headquarters: Prague

Programming
- Language: Czech

Ownership
- Owner: Stanice O
- Sister channels: Óčko; Óčko Expres; Óčko Black

History
- Launched: 1 July 2013
- Former names: Óčko Hity (pre-launch); Óčko Gold (2013-2017)

Links
- Website: https://ocko.tv/

Availability

Terrestrial
- DVB-T/T2: MUX 22 (FTA)

Óčko Star (formerly Óčko Gold) is a Czech music television channel that started broadcasting on June 1, 2013.

== History ==
The MAFRA company (the owner of the Óčko station) wanted to launch a second channel. Two variants of the name were prepared: Óčko Retro and Óčko Hity.

MAFRA chose Óčko Hity and applied for a license, which it received. After obtaining the license, it was decided that Óčko Hity would be renamed Óčko Gold.

From October 1, 2017, the station changed its name to Óčko Star.

== Availability ==
Óčko Star broadcasts in DVB-T2 Multiplex 22 of Czech Radiocommunications, on cable TV and via live broadcast on the Internet. It also broadcasts on satellite on the Skylink platform.

== Characteristics ==
Óčko Star focuses on the biggest hits from the 80s to the present day. The program is aimed at men and women from 25 to 45 years old. It brings home and world hits, time-tested compositions. The profile stars of ÓČKO STAR are global and domestic idols such as Robbie Williams, Michael Jackson, Adele, Madonna, Rihanna, Pink, U2, Coldplay, Chinaski, Kryštof, Lucie, No Name, Ewa Farna, Richard Müller and others.
