= Óčko Expres =

Czech music television channel

- Country: Czech Republic
- Headquarters: Prague

Programming
- Language: Czech

Ownership
- Owner: Stanice O
- Sister channels: Óčko; Óčko Star; Óčko Black

History
- Launched: 15 August 2013

Links
- Website: https://ocko.tv/

Availability

Terrestrial
- DVB-T/T2: Regional Network 12 (FTA); Regional Network 8 (FTA)

Óčko Expres is a Czech music television station that started broadcasting on 15 August 2013. It broadcasts on the Internet, cable TV, IPTV and satellite. It focuses on modern music.

== History ==
MAFRA wanted to launch a third channel. Two variants were offered: Óčko 3 and Óčko Expres, which won. It is the third channel of TV Óčko. The dramaturgy of Óčko Expres is provided by Prague's Expresradio, which also belongs to the MAFRA group.

It broadcasts on IPTV and cable companies.
