= Soudkyně Barbara =

- Directed by: Ivan Predmerský; Braňo Mišík; Kristína Hercegová
- Starring: Pavlína Kafková; Alena Sasínová-Polarzcyk; Simona Prasková
- Country of origin: Czech Republic
- Original language: Czech

Production
- Running time: 60 minutes

Original release
- Network: TV Barrandov
- Release: 2015 – 2023

Soudkyně Barbara (Judge Barbara) is a Czech television series set in the judicial environment, broadcast since 2015 by TV Barrandov.

== Program ==
It was broadcast on weekdays at 17:10 and was successful in terms of viewers, in the given broadcast time it reached twice the normal viewership of this station's programs. It is the most successful project of TV Barrandov's original programming.

In 2009, TV Barrandov started broadcasting the program Soudní siň, but then it was not successful. From May 25, 2015, the same show was broadcast with the new name Judge Barbara. It is the Czech version of the Slovak program Súdna sieň on TV JOJ. The show is set in a courtroom where trials take place based on true stories. It was filmed in Bratislava on the sets of the Slovak version.

Actresses Pavlína Kafková, Alena Sasínová-Polarzcyk and Simona Prasková alternated in the main role as Judge Barbara. The show is directed by Ivan Predmerský, Braňo Mišík and Kristína Hercegová and scripts are written by several authors (e.g. Naďa Uličná). Dramaturgy is handled by Marek Růžička and Katarína Gažová.

Eva Hráská, Lenka Vacvalová, Michaela Horká and appeared in recurring roles of lawyers.

In 2017, a similar program called Soudce Alexandr (Judge Alexandr) began to be broadcast. He usually deals with lawsuits about money, debts, etc.

== Cast ==
- Pavlína Kafková as Barbara Richterová
- Alena Sasínová-Polarzcyk and Simona Prasková as Barbara Němcová
