= Nova Lady =

Czech television station

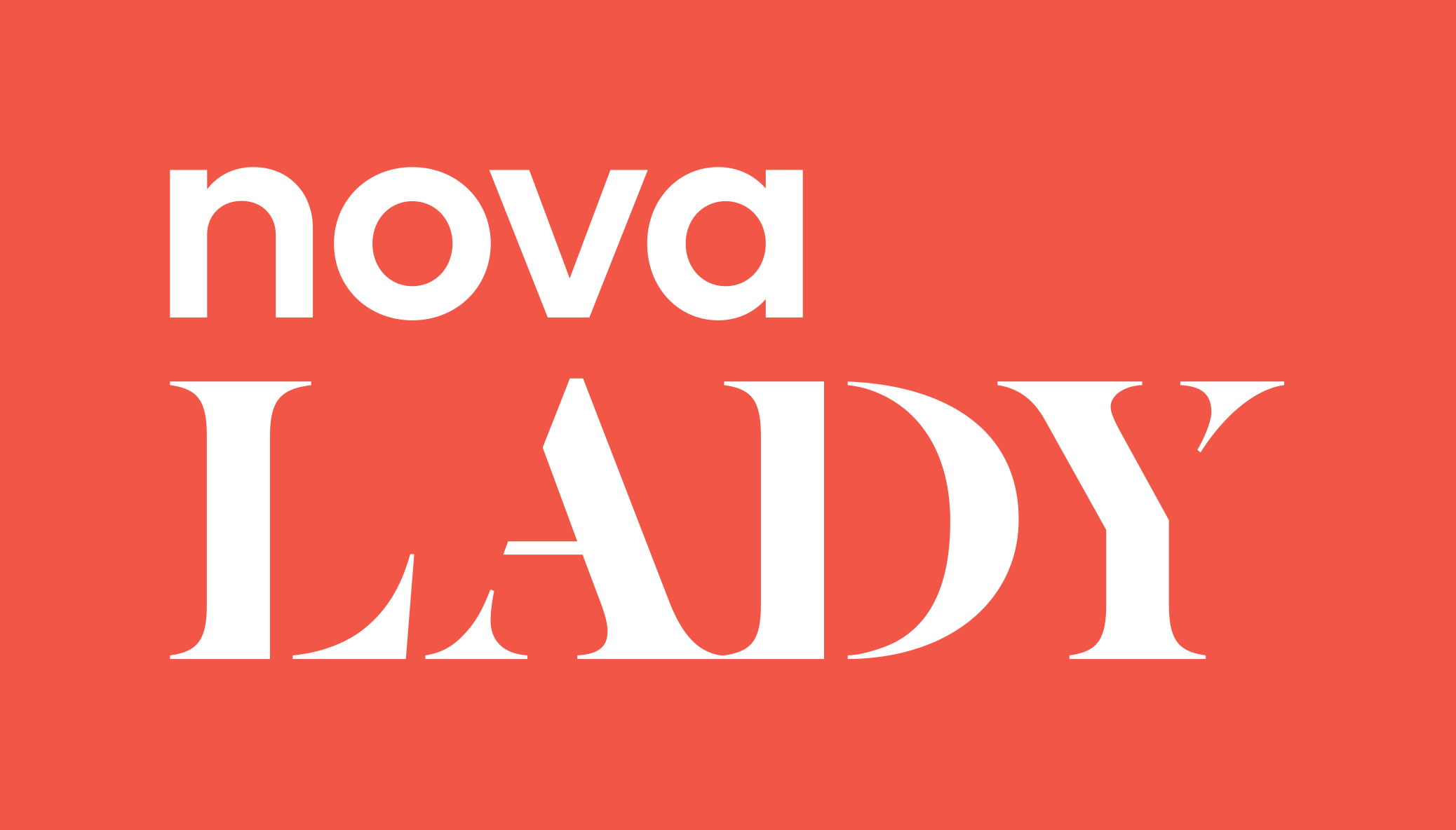
- Country: Czech Republic
- Headquarters: Prague

Programming
- Language: Czech

Ownership
- Owner: CME
- Sister channels: TV Nova; Nova Cinema; Nova Action; Nova Fun; Nova Krimi; Nova Sport 1 Nova Sport 2 Nova Sport 3 Nova Sport 4 Nova Sport 5 Nova Sport 6 Nova International

History
- Launched: 18 October 2021

Availability

Terrestrial
- DVB-T/T2: MUX 24 (FTA)

Streaming media
- Nova.cz: Watch live (Czech only)

Nova Lady is a Czech free-to-air commercial television station belonging to the Nova Group, which is mainly aimed at a female audience, broadcasting Czech and foreign romantic series, films and reality shows. The station began broadcasting on October 18, 2021. Like other Nova Group channels, they belong to the TV Nova company, which falls under CME.

== History ==
For the first time, consideration was given to launching a Nova group station dedicated to women as early as 2011. The 12-year license for terrestrial and Internet broadcasting was granted by the Council for Radio and Television Broadcasting to TV Nova at its meeting on 10 August 2021.

== Programming ==
=== TV Series ===
- Adini Feriha Koydum
- Chicago Med
- Gilmore Girls
- Jedna Rodina
- Love, Reason, Get Even
- Ordinace v růžové zahradě 2
- Ulice
- Zlatá labuť
- Yaçokseversen

=== TV Reality ===
- Below Deck Mediterranean
- Extreme Makeover: Home Edition
