= Nova Fun =

Czech television station

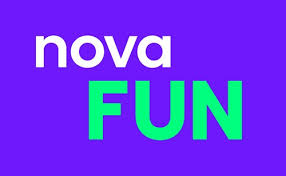
- Country: Czech Republic
- Headquarters: Prague

Programming
- Language: Czech

Ownership
- Owner: CME
- Sister channels: TV Nova; Nova Cinema; Nova Action; Nova Krimi; Nova Lady; Nova Sport 1 Nova Sport 2 Nova Sport 3 Nova Sport 4 Nova Sport 5 Nova Sport 6 Nova International

History
- Launched: 22 December 2012
- Former names: Smíchov TV (2012-2017); Nova 2 (2017-2021)

Availability

Terrestrial
- DVB-T/T2: MUX 24 (FTA)

Streaming media
- Nova.cz: Watch live (Czech only)

Nova Fun is a Czech free-to-air commercial television station, belonging to the Nova Group, which focuses its programming exclusively on shows, series, or films of the comedy genre. The license to broadcast it is owned by TV Nova s.r.o., which is owned by the foreign company CME. The station began broadcasting on December 23, 2012, under the name Smíchov TV. On February 4, 2017, it was renamed Nova 2 to unify the channel names of the Nova group. On September 20, 2021, the station got a new name again, namely Nova Fun.

== Programming ==
=== TV Series ===
- 2 Broke Girls
- American Dad!
- Bob's Burgers
- Bob Hearts Abishola
- Family Guy
- Friends
- Home Improvement
- Melissa & Joey
- Mom
- Sex and the City
- Step by Step
- That '70s Show
- The Big Bang Theory
- Two and a Half Men
- Will & Grace
- Young & Hungry
- Young Sheldon

=== Kids TV Series ===
- A Pup Named Scooby-Doo
- Bakugan: Legends
- Kung Fu Panda: Legends of Awesomeness
- Monsters vs. Aliens
- Oggy and the Cockroaches
- Oggy and the Cockroaches: Next Generation
- SpongeBob SquarePants
- Transformers: Robots in Disguise
- What's New, Scooby-Doo?
- Zig & Sharko

== Logos ==
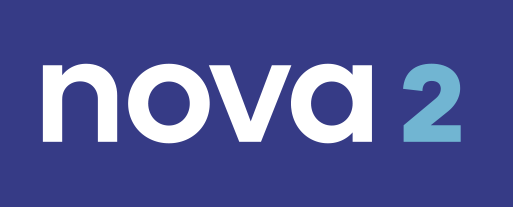
Nova 2 logo (2017–2021)

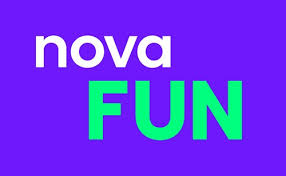
Nova Fun logo since 2021
