= Do-Re-Mi (TV series) =

- Presented by: Sabina Laurinová and Pavel Trávníček
- Country of origin: Czech Republic

Original release
- Release: 1998 – 2006

Do-Re-Mi is a weekly Czech amateur singer contest TV show aired by TV Nova during 1998-2006. Its hosts were Sabina Laurinová and Pavel Trávníček. 330 segments have been produced where about 2,000 amateur contestants and 600 jurors (celebrities and professional musicians) took part.

This TV show was also repeated on TV JOJ.

== Highlights ==
The show was a turning point for singer Helena Zeťová.

In 2007, the part of the show, where a Václav Pergl sings Karel Gott's Láska bláznivá ("Crazy Love"), was listed among top funniest Czech YouTube videos.
