= Central European Media Enterprises =

Media and entertainment company

Central European Media Enterprises Ltd.
- Type: Subsidiary
- Industry: Media
- Founded: December 2, 1991; 34 years ago
- Founders: Ronald Lauder; Mark Palmer
- Headquarters: Prague, Czech Republic
- Key people: Sam Barnett (CEO)
- Products: Television broadcasting Television production Video on demand service provider
- Parent: PPF Group
- Website: www.cme.net

Central European Media Enterprises (CME) is a media and entertainment group owned by PPF Group. It operates television businesses across seven countries in Central and Eastern Europe. Its main networks include TV Nova in the Czech Republic, Markíza in Slovakia, Pro TV in Romania, bTV in Bulgaria, RTL in Croatia and POP TV in Slovenia. CME operates 47 television channels reaching about 49 million viewers and also provides streaming services through Voyo and Oneplay.

CME was incorporated in Bermuda in 1994 and grew into one of the major commercial broadcasting groups in the region. Time Warner became a major shareholder in 2009 and later gained control of the company. In 2020, PPF Group acquired CME in a transaction valued at about US$2.1 billion and took the company private.

== History ==
CME traces its origins to the Central European Development Corporation (CEDC), an investment company led by Ronald Lauder and Mark Palmer that entered the emerging commercial television market in post-communist Central and Eastern Europe. Its first major venture was TV Nova, which began broadcasting in the Czech Republic in 1994. Central European Media Enterprises Ltd. was incorporated in Bermuda later that year. CME expanded rapidly during the 1990s, launching or acquiring broadcasters including POP TV in Slovenia, Pro TV in Romania and Markíza in Slovakia.

CME lost control of TV Nova in 1999 after a dispute with its Czech business partner Vladimír Železný. The dispute led to international arbitration against the Czech Republic, which ended in CME's favour in 2003 and resulted in compensation of about US$353 million including interest and costs. CME regained control of Nova in 2005 after acquiring an 85% stake in the television group from PPF for about US$630 million.

Time Warner acquired a 31% economic interest in CME in 2009 and later gained control of the company. In 2010, CME sold its Ukrainian operations and acquired the Bulgarian bTV group from News Corporation for US$400 million.

In 2019, CME agreed to be acquired by PPF Group in a deal valued at about US$2.1 billion. The acquisition was completed in October 2020 after approval by the European Commission. Under PPF, CME expanded its streaming business through Voyo. In 2022, it acquired RTL Croatia from RTL Group, returning to the Croatian television market.

== Operations ==
CME operates 47 television channels across Bulgaria, Croatia, the Czech Republic, Moldova, Romania, Slovakia and Slovenia. Its main networks include bTV, RTL, TV Nova, Pro TV, Markíza and POP TV. The group also produces local news, entertainment and drama for its television and digital services.

CME also operates the Voyo streaming service in several Central and Eastern European markets. Voyo expanded to Serbia in November 2024, its first market where CME did not also operate a television station. Original series and films are released under the Voyo Originals brand.

In the Czech Republic, Voyo and O2 TV were combined in March 2025 to create Oneplay, which offers both streaming and live television.

== CME Content Academy ==
In 2022 Central European Media Enterprises Ltd. launched CME Content Academy. The two-year course is designed to provide participants with a foundation across various film-making disciplines, enabling students to become TV professionals.

The practice is divided according to the production scheme of TV Nova, POP TV, PRO TV, bTV, RTL and TV Markíza and takes place in Brno, Prague, Zagreb, Ljubljana, Bucharest, Sofia and Bratislava.

In 2026, the CME Content Academy became a year-long multidisciplinary course for college graduates in audiovisual production.

== CME Cares ==
In 2023, CME launched its ESG strategy branded CME Cares. This initiative was created to communicate CME's efforts to leave a lasting positive impact on its environment, communities, and societies. CME Cares aims to offer socially responsible content, implement sustainable production practices, aid underprivileged communities, and follow transparent business practices.

== Television channels ==
Bulgaria

- bTV
- bTV Cinema
- bTV Comedy
- bTV Action
- bTV Story
- Ring

Croatia

- RTL
- RTL 2
- RTL Kockica
- RTL Living
- RTL Crime
- RTL Passion
- RTL Adria
- RTL Croatia World

Czech Republic

- TV Nova
- Nova Cinema
- Nova Action
- Nova Fun
- Nova Krimi
- Nova Lady
- Nova Sport 1
- Nova Sport 2
- Nova Sport 3
- Nova Sport 4
- Nova Sport 5
- Nova Sport 6
- Nova International

Romania and Moldova

- Pro TV (also broadcast in the Republic of Moldova as a simulcast feed)
- Acasă (also broadcast in the Republic of Moldova as a simulcast feed)
- Acasă Gold
- Pro Arena
- Pro Cinema
- Pro TV International
- Pro TV Chisinau

Slovakia

- Markíza
- Markíza Doma
- Markíza Dajto
- Markíza Krimi
- Markíza Klasik
- Markíza International

Slovenia

- Pop TV
- Kanal A
- Brio
- Oto
- Kino
- Astra

== VOD services ==
- Voyo
