= Óčko =

Czech music television channel

Óčko TV
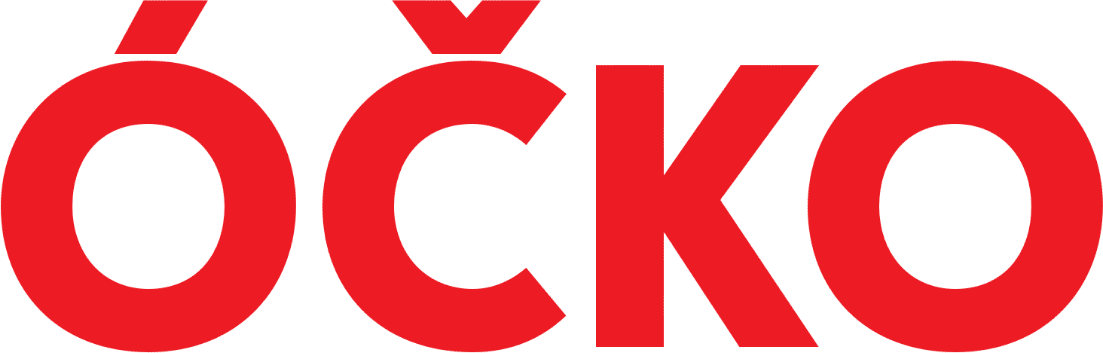
- Country: Czechia
- Headquarters: Prague

Ownership
- Owner: Stanice O, a.s.
- Key people: Jiří Balvín
- Sister channels: Óčko Star; Óčko Expres; Óčko Black

History
- Launched: 30 September 2002; 24 years ago
- Former names: Stanice O

Links
- Website: ocko.tv

Availability

Terrestrial
- DVB-T/T2: MUX 22 (FTA)

Óčko (formerly stylized as Òĉko) is a Czech music television channel that started broadcasting on 30 September 2002. This was the Czech Republic's first music channel.

The majority of the audience are teenagers and people from the 12–35 age group. The channel plays music videos of all different genres including the latest hits.

Apart from regular charts, there are special shows which concentrate only on certain music styles. The program also includes live concerts of Czech as well as foreign singers and bands. There is a big emphasis on interactivity. Up to 8 hours a day, the program is influenced by the viewers, who can either use email or SMS to vote for songs.

Óčko was also one of the first Czech television channels that was able to be broadcast online. Internet users can therefore watch this channel for free and choose the video quality to suit their connection speed. The best quality offers streaming video in 1.3 MB/s. It's also available on Instagram since the start of April 2024.

== Óčko Music Awards ==
In the Óčko Music Awards event, viewers send SMS messages to vote in different categories, which are divided into Czech and World. The categories include Best Male/Female Singer, Best Band, Best Hip-Hop, Best Rock, Best Music Video, Best Hard & Heavy, Best R&B, Best Pop, and Best Newcomer.

== Shows ==
- Madhouse – metal music, talks with bands
- Inbox – interviews and talk, presented by Lenny Trčková
- Akcelerace – music videos "for good mood"
- News – new music videos
- Trendy Face – professional stylists makeover random people from the street
- Cz & Sk – Czech and Slovak music videos
- Jízda – music videos
- No Future – Punk rock
- 5th element – hip-hop
- Dojezd – nonstop music videos chosen by viewers
- Frisbee – electronic music
- Hitzone 80's – oldies
- Babylon – Latin music, reggae, blues
- BreakOut – less known musicians
- Cream – news from the music world (concerts, exhibitions, new albums, etc.)
- VIP Mix – a celebrity chooses music videos
- Official Czech Chart – Czech Top 40
- FlashIn – lifestyle (current world trends)
- Happy Tree Friends – animated series
- Hip Hop Don't Stop
- Host Óčka – interview show, presented by Lenny Trčková
- Rock therapy – rock music
- Pelíšky slavných – a show similar to MTV Cribs
- T-Music Chart – viewers' top 20

== Sister channels ==
Channel Name	Start date	Former Names	Theme	Channel color(s)
Óčko Star	1 July 2013	Óčko Retro (proposed); Óčko Hity (pre-launch); Óčko Gold (2013–2017)	Music from the 1980s-present	Yellow
Óčko Expres	15 August 2013	Óčko 3 (proposed)	Modern music	Red
Óčko Black	5 February 2019		Hip-hop and soul rock	Black

== Logo history ==
First Óčko logo, used from 2002 to 2012
