= TV Nova (Czech Republic) =

Czech television channel

- Logo used since 2024
- Country: Czech Republic
- Broadcast area: Czech Republic, parts of Germany, Slovakia, Poland, Austria.

Programming
- Language: Czech
- Picture format: 16:9/4:3 in 576i (SDTV); 1080i (HDTV)
- Timeshift service: Nova +1 HD (2017–2022)

Ownership
- Owner: TV Nova s. r. o. (CME, owned by PPF Group)
- Sister channels: Nova Cinema; Nova Action; Nova Fun; Nova Krimi; Nova Lady; Nova Sport 1 Nova Sport 2 Nova Sport 3 Nova Sport 4 Nova Sport 5 Nova Sport 6 Nova International

History
- Launched: 4 February 1994; 32 years ago

Links
- Website: Official website

Availability

Terrestrial
- DVB-T/T2: MUX 23 (FTA); MUX 24 (FTA)

Streaming media
- Nova.cz: Watch live (Czech only)
- Oneplay: Watch live (Czech only)

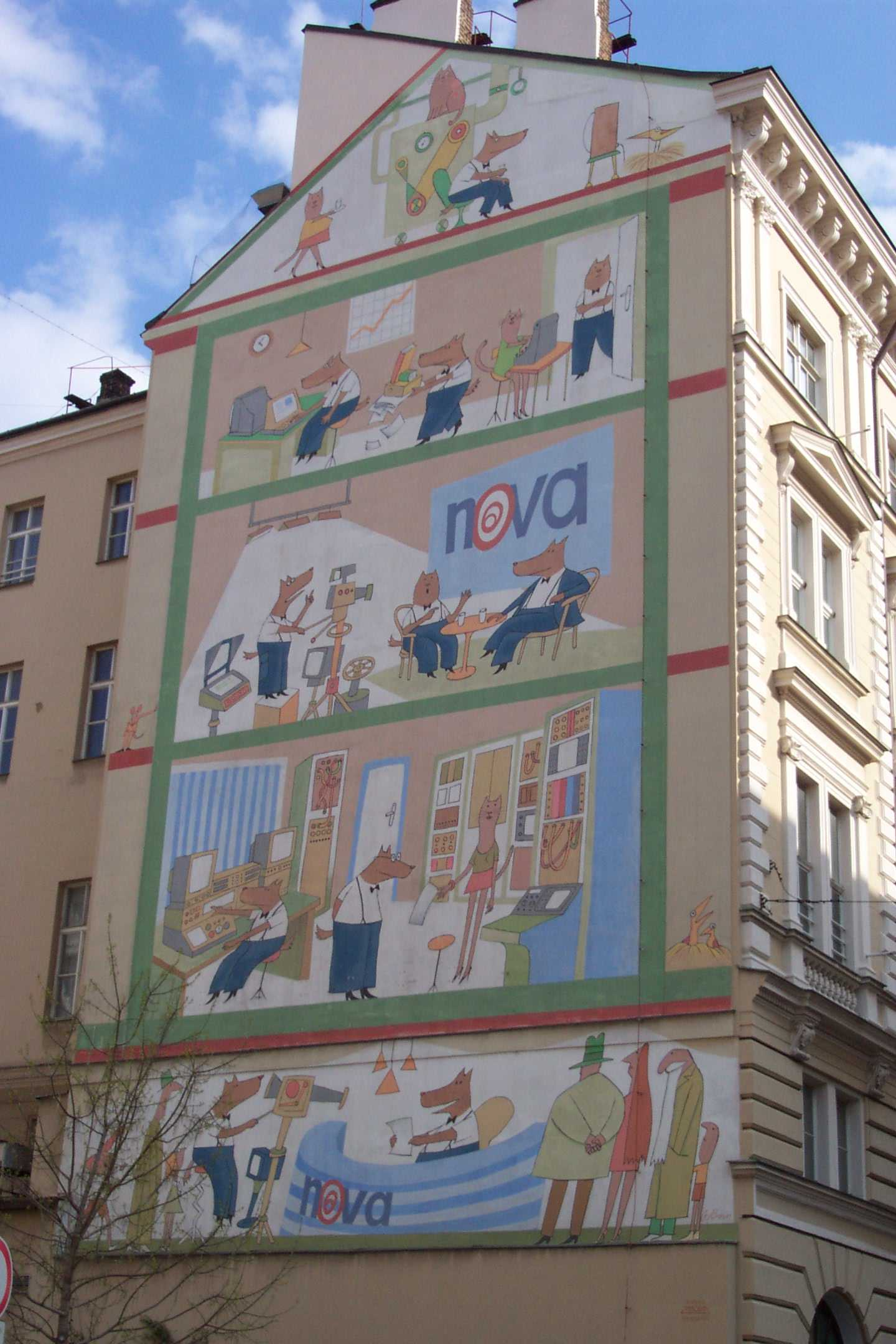
Façade of the former TV Nova building.

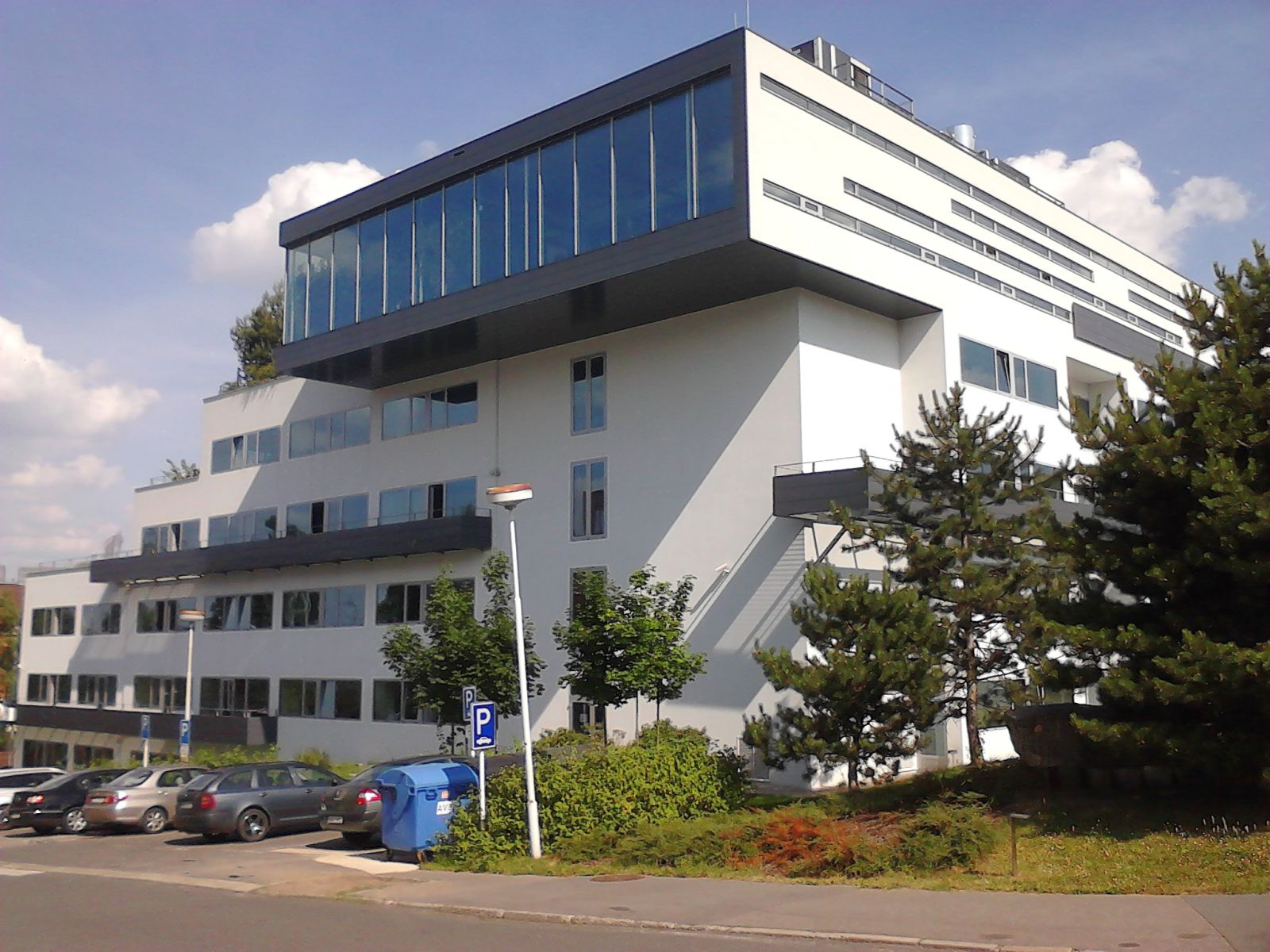
Building of TV Nova at Barrandov quarter of Prague

TV Nova is a commercial television channel in the Czech Republic. It began broadcasting in February 1994 as the first privately held national Czech TV station. Its first CEO was Vladimír Železný. It quickly achieved the largest market share in the country and remained in this position until the early 2010s.

== History ==
TV Nova began broadcasting on February 4, 1994, as the first privately held, nationwide commercial television station in the Czech Republic. It quickly became the market leader, redefining Czech broadcasting with new formats, dynamic journalism, entertainment programming, and innovative marketing. It attracted a massive audience with locally produced shows and became one of the most profitable TV stations in Europe, generating profit within nine months of going on air. During the 1990s, Nova offered a mix of original local productions and popular imported foreign programming, a significant departure from the previous state-run television format. TV Nova invested heavily in locally produced content that resonated with Czech audiences. They even produced a number of comedy shows, featuring actors like Jiří Lábus and Oldřich Kaiser, alongside the creation of its own quiz show.

A major point in Nova's history was the dispute between the license holder, CET 21, and its financial supplier, Central European Media Enterprises (CME). The channel also attracted some notoriety for its late-night nude weather reports ("Počasíčko"), in which a female (and later male) presenter would appear naked to present the weather. The presenter would then put on clothes appropriate to the weather being forecast. The fallout from this conflict led to an international arbitration case (CME/Lauder v. Czech Republic) that resulted in the Czech state being ordered to pay CME $353 million in compensation for failing to protect their investment. Following this, CME eventually gained full ownership of Nova.

In the late 2000s, Nova expanded its services and adopted new technologies, starting with broadcasting in 16:9 in 2007, followed by the launch of a widescreen channel in 2008, and later developing a multi-channel strategy, by launching several niche channels. In response to the rise of global streaming giants, Nova launched its own streaming service, Voyo, in 2011, which has since become a key focus for investment, offering exclusive original content. The company also expanded its HbbTV (hybrid broadcast broadband TV) services.

In 2020, the PPF investment group, owned by Petr Kellner at the time, acquired CME, the parent company of TV Nova, thus bringing the station under domestic ownership. TV Nova has also committed to sustainable production practices, publishing the first Green Filmmaking Manual in the Czech Republic in 2021. Today, the Nova group remains a leading media entity in the Czech Republic, consistently achieving a high market share with its wide range of channels and strong digital presence.

== Nova HD ==
Starting October 2008, TV Nova is broadcast in HD via satellite, cable, and DVB-T. Currently the signal is broadcast in 1080i with a bitrate of 18 Mbit/s.

== Sister channels ==
Channel Name	Launch Date	Former Names	Theme	Main Colors
Nova Cinema	1 December 2007		Movies	blue
Nova Sport 1	4 October 2008	Nova Sport (2008-2015)	Mainstream sports	black blue
Nova Action	14 July 2012	TV Fanda (2012-2017)	Young men	yellow black
Nova Fun	23 December 2012	TV Smíchov (2012-2017); Nova 2 (2017-2021)	Comedy and kids programming	violet green
Nova Krimi	22 February 2013	TV Telka (2013-2017); Nova Gold (2016-2025)	Crime and archive	tan brown
Nova Sport 2	5 September 2015		Popular sports	black light blue
Nova International	1 February 2016		slovak version of TV Nova	blue
Nova Sport 3	13 August 2021		Soccer	black green
Nova Sport 4	13 August 2021		Soccer	black turquoise
Nova Lady	18 October 2021		Women	light red
Nova Sport 5	29 February 2024		motorsport	black red
Nova Sport 6	29 February 2024		motorsport	black pink

== Programming ==
=== Current ===
- Ulice
- Kriminálka Anděl Mondays 20:00–21:00
- Soukromé pasti ("Private Traps")
- Ordinace v růžové zahradě 2 ("Doctor's office in rose garden 2")
- Pojišťovna štěstí ("Insurance company of luck")
- Comeback
- Nováci Every day from September 1995 to April 1996; sometimes reprised
- Draculův švagr Horror series, which ran short time in 1996
- Robinsonův ostrov Reality series, Czech version of Survivor

=== Former ===
- Chcete být milionářem? (2000–2005, 2016–2017) Game show, Czech version of Who Wants to Be a Millionaire?
- DO-RE-MI (1998–2004)

=== Periodical ===
Title	Format	Timeslot
112 (based on "COPS")	documentary, crime	Tuesdays 22:05–22:30
Televizní noviny, Sportovní noviny, Počasí ("TV News, Sports News and Weather")	TV news	every day 19:30–20:00; Sunday–Friday 17:00–17:30
Snídaně s Novou ("Breakfast with Nova")	Breakfast TV	weekdays 5:55–9:00
Na vlastní oči ("With Your Own Eyes")	documentary	Wednesdays 22:15–22:55
Za pět minut dvanáct ("Five Minutes to Twelve")	talk show	Sundays 11:55–13:20
Střepiny ("Fractions")	documentary	Sundays 21:15–21:45
Víkend ("Weekend")	Infotainment	Tuesdays 21:00–21:35
Eso ("Ace")	music	not running
Rady ptáka Loskutáka ("Hints of the Bird Gracula")	home improvement	Sundays 18:00–18:55
Občanské judo ("Citizen's Judo")	documentary	Sundays 18:55–19:30
Babicovy dobroty ("Babica's Goodies")	cooking show	Saturdays 18:00–18:35
Koření ("Spice")	Infotainment	Saturdays 18:35–19:30
Mr. GS	talk show	Sundays 21:40–22:10

Tipy ptáka Loskutáka (Tips of the bird Gracula) is the teleshopping section of Rady ptáka Loskutáka. The Czech Republic has a law regulation that would suggest different names.

== Logos ==
TV Nova's first logo, used from 1994-1996.

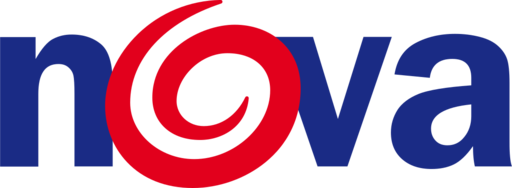
TV Nova's second logo, used from 1996-2004.

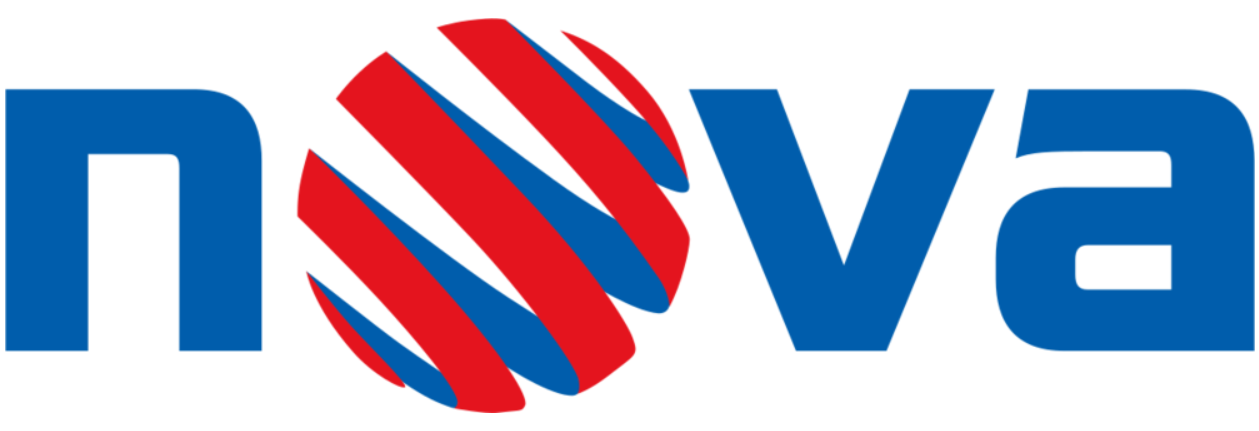
TV Nova's third logo, used from 2004-2017.

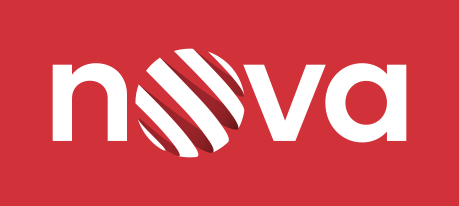
TV Nova's fourth logo, used from 2017-2024.

TV Nova's fifth logo, used since 2024.

== CME Content Academy ==
In 2022, TV Nova and Markíza launched the CME Content Academy, in cooperation with the Brno Television Institute. The scholarship program is funded by Central European Media Enterprises, to which both TV Nova and Markíza belong. The academy's two-year course is a professional training course designed to provide participants with a grounding across various film-making disciplines.

The training is based around the production schedules of TV Nova, PRO TV, POP TV, bTV, RTL and Markíza and takes place in Brno, Prague, Zagreb, Ljubljana, Bucharest, Sofia and Bratislava.

== See also ==
- List of original shows by TV Nova
