= TV Barrandov =

Czech television channel

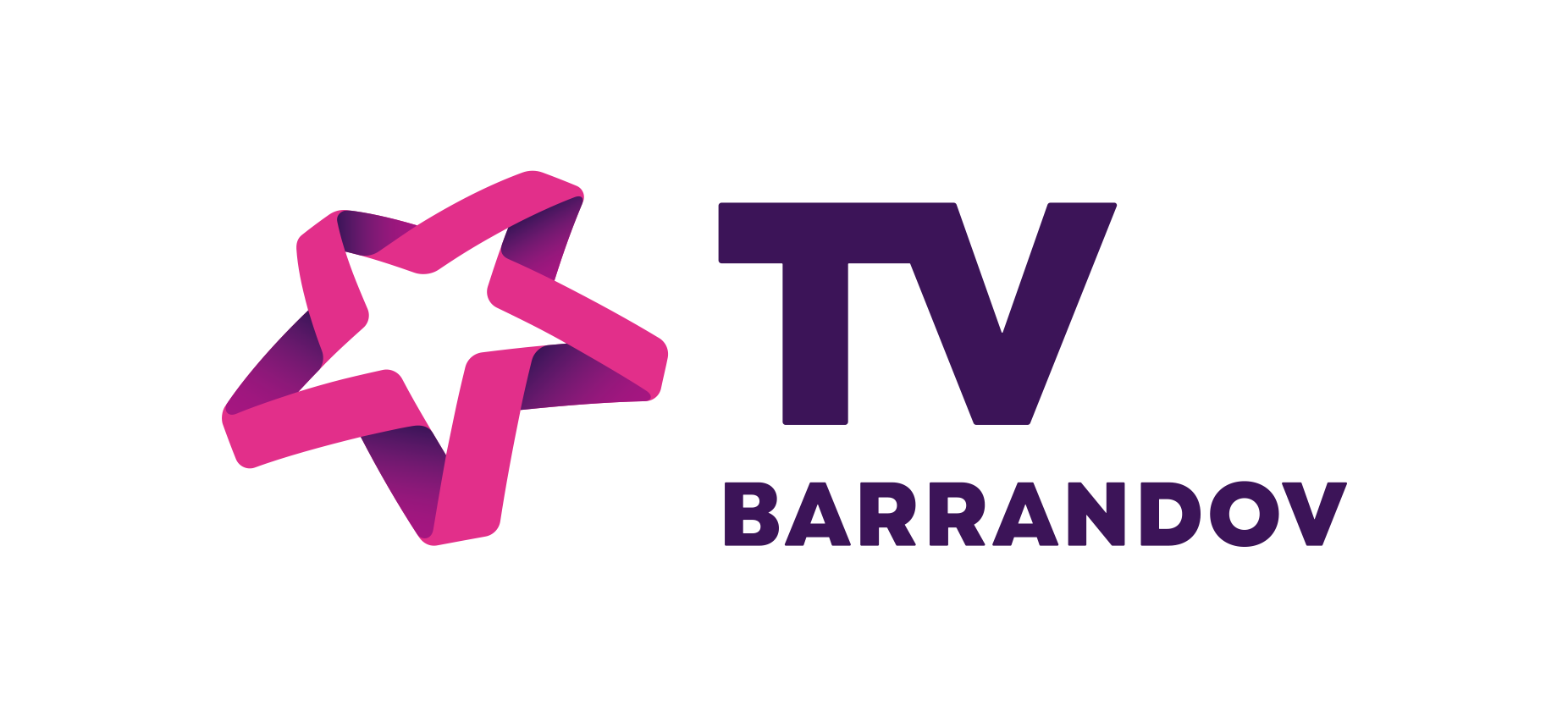
- Country: Czech Republic
- Broadcast area: Czech Republic and Worldwide
- Headquarters: Prague, Czech Republic

Programming
- Language: Czech
- Picture format: 16:9/4:3 576i (SDTV); 720p/1080i (HDTV)

Ownership
- Owner: Jan Čermák
- Sister channels: Barrandov Kino; Barrandov Krimi

History
- Launched: 11 January 2009

Links
- Website: www.barrandov.tv

Availability

Terrestrial
- DVB-T/T2: MUX 23 (FTA)

TV Barrandov is a Czech television channel, launched in 2009. It was founded and started to broadcast in 2009. It currently broadcasts in Czech.

In 2015 after Chinese company CEFC China Energy invested in TV Barrandov's parent company Empresa Media, the tone of TV Barrandov's coverage of China changed with all neutral and negative reporting about China being replaced by positive reporting.

TV Barrandov is currently dealing with a bad financial situation. On 20 January 2024 TV Barrandov stopped broadcast after reportedly being cut from electricity due to debts. Broadcast was restored after 10 hours. In May 2024, according to Evidence skutečných majitelů (Records of beneficial owners) businessman Jan Čermák bought another 50 percent of publishing company Empresa Media from Jaromír Soukup and became only owner of TV Barrandov. Soukup later denied transaction and said there is error in records. The operating company Studio TV Barrandov closed in late May 2026, however, as of 10 June, the channel was still operational, granted that the three Barrandov channels had to resort to third-party companies to continue broadcasting.

== Logo history ==
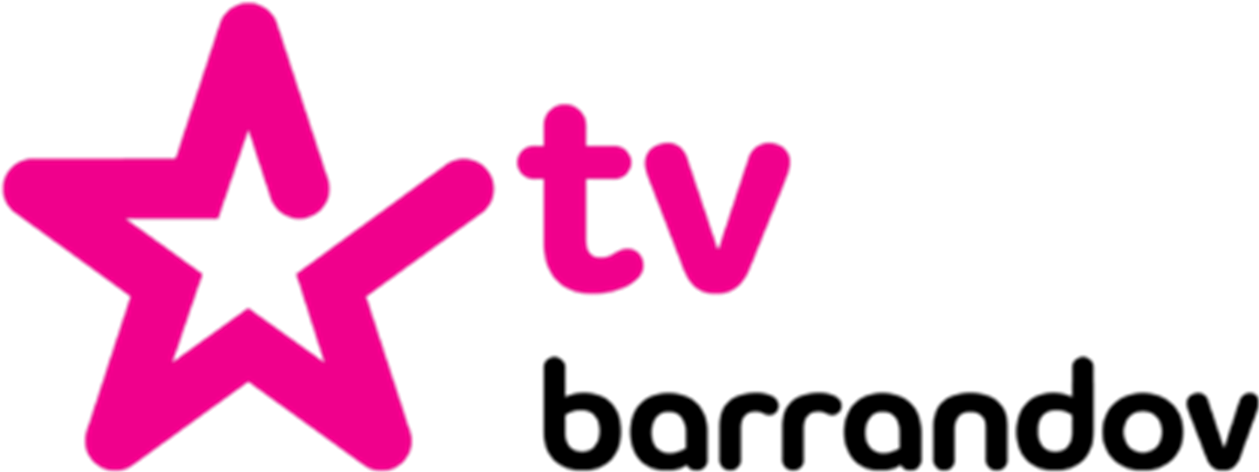
fourth logo TV Barrandov from 2015 to 2025
