= Prima Cool =

Czech television channel

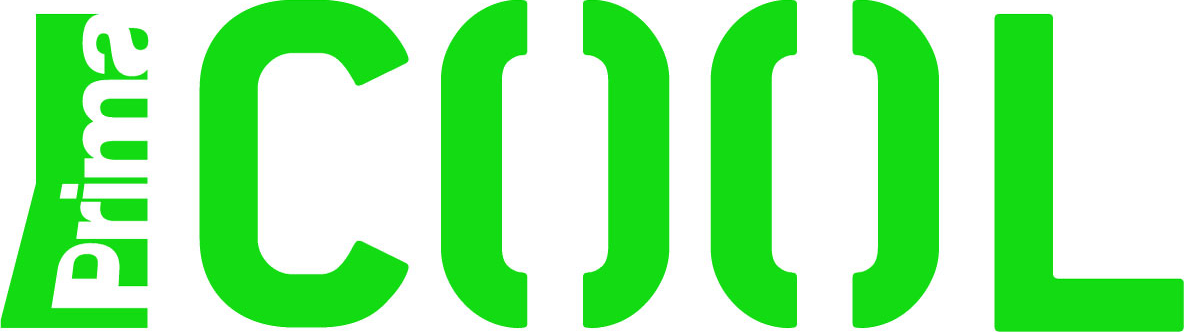
- Country: Czech Republic
- Broadcast area: Czech Republic; Slovakia
- Headquarters: Strašnice, Prague

Programming
- Language: Czech
- Picture format: 16:9/4:3 576i (SDTV); 720p/1080i (HDTV)

Ownership
- Owner: FTV Prima; MTG
- Sister channels: TV Prima; Prima Krimi; Prima Love; Prima Max; Prima Show; Prima Sport; Prima Star; Prima Zoom; CNN Prima News; Prima SK

History
- Launched: 1 April 2009

Links
- Website: Official website

Availability

Terrestrial
- DVB-T/T2: MUX 22 (FTA)

Streaming media
- Prima+: Watch live (Czech only)

Prima Cool is a private Czech television station.

Prima Cool is TV Prima's second channel. It is targeted primarily at young male audiences.

Prima Cool launched on 1 April 2009 as TV Prima's new digital channel. It is available on Czech DVB-T multiplex 2, where it is freely broadcast (covering up to 72% of the population of the Czech republic, mainly in Bohemia). The channel is also broadcast through DVB-S on satellite Astra 1G, and available on cable TV (in all packages, due to the must-carry law).

== Ratings ==
- Ratings in December 2009 were about a 1.3% share (eighth/ninth place).
- Ratings in April 2010 were a more than 2.0% share (eighth/ninth place).
- Ratings in June 2011 were a more than 3.9% share (sixth/seventh place).
- Ratings in March 2012 were a more than 6.5% share (fourth place)
