= Prima Show =

Czech television station

- Country: Czech Republic
- Broadcast area: Czech Republic
- Headquarters: Strašnice, Prague

Programming
- Language: Czech
- Picture format: 16:9/4:3 576i (SDTV); 720p/1080i (HDTV)

Ownership
- Owner: FTV Prima
- Sister channels: TV Prima; Prima Cool; Prima Krimi; Prima Love; Prima Max; Prima Sport; Prima Star; Prima Zoom; CNN Prima News; Prima SK

History
- Launched: 25 October 2021

Links
- Website: Official website

Availability

Terrestrial
- DVB-T/T2: MUX 22 (FTA)

Streaming media
- Prima+: Watch live (Czech only)

Prima Show is a Czech television channel, it is the eleventh channel of FTV Prima. The station is mainly focused on non-European reality shows and entertainment programs such as Like House, Královny butiků, Temptation Island, Beauty and the Geek or Wife Swap.

== History ==
On 19 August 2021, FTV Prima submitted an application for a license to broadcast a new programme, which was approved by the Council for Radio and Television Broadcasting at a meeting on 14 September, and which is valid for a period of 12 years. The station began broadcasting on October 25, 2021, at 6 p.m.
