= Vinohrady tram depot =

Historic tram depot

- Vozovna Královské Vinohrady
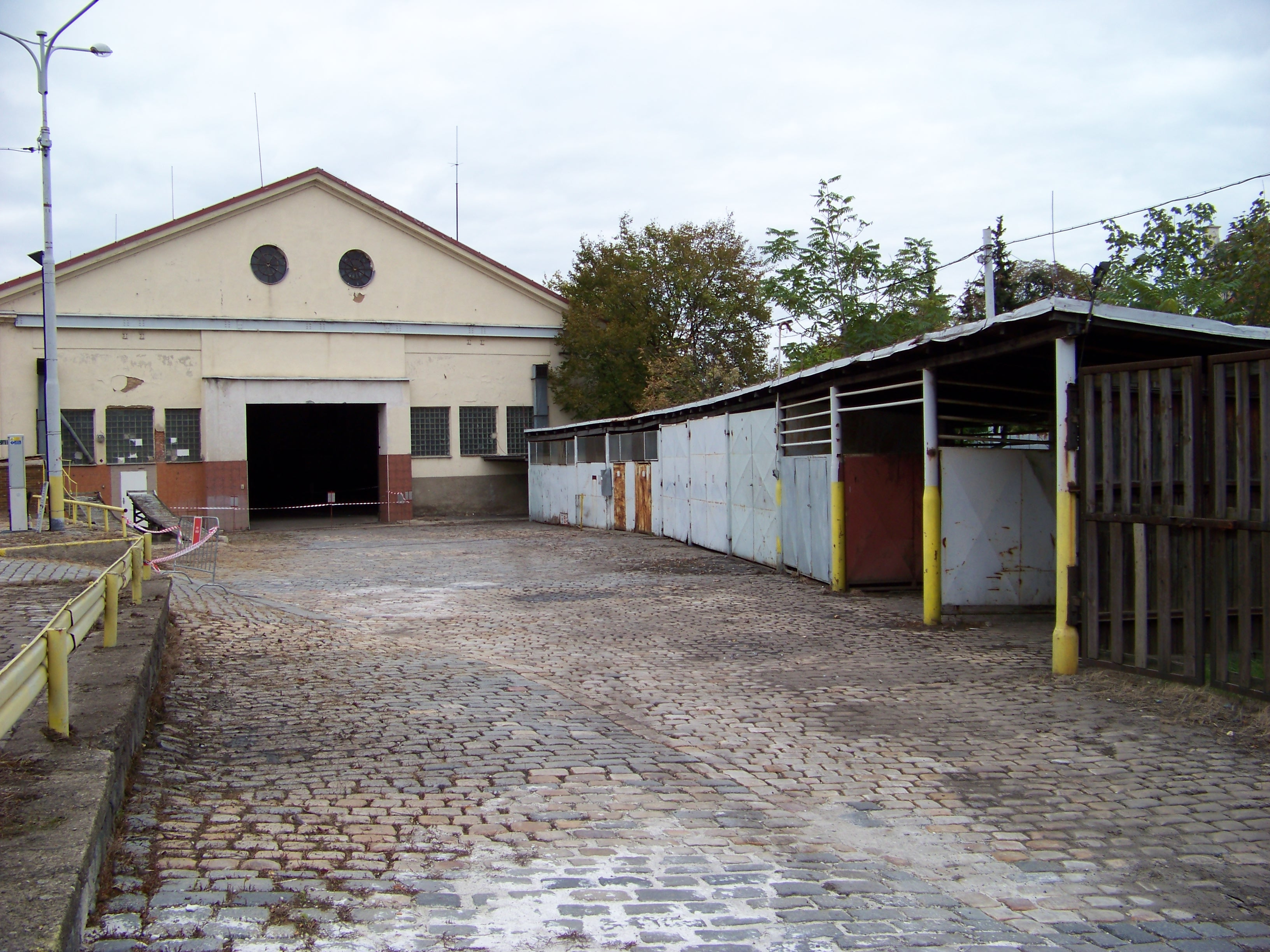
- the depot in 2010
- Interactive map of the Vinohrady tram depot area

General information
- Location: Korunní 963, Prague 10, Czech Republic
- Coordinates: 50.075°N 14.4611°E

Vinohrady tram depot (Czech: Vozovna Královské Vinohrady) is a former tram and trolleybus depot at Vinohrady that was part of the Prague tram network from 1897. The last Prague trolley bus left from here in 1972.

== History ==
The trams started in Prague with the horse drawn network extending to Vinohrady in 1883. In 1891 electrification was gradually introduced. The line from Vinohrady to Prague had 15 stations in a route that was less than six kilometres long. The unification of the trams into one company was not complete until the twentieth century and electrification was complete in 1905.

A memorial plaque and sculpture were installed in 2010 to record the place where the last trolleybus in Prague left for its final journey on 15 October 1972.

The buildings were part of the tram system until 1933 but it was then used for temporary storage since then.

The building was opened as part of European Heritage Days in 2012 where visitors can see the buildings which still date from 1897.

== Description ==
Just outside the depot is a sculpture designed by Michal Gabriel which includes the message Orionka and a preservation of part of the turning circle used by Prague trolley buses until 1972. The tramlines can still be seen in the cobbled entrance to the depot.
