= Prima Love =

Czech television station

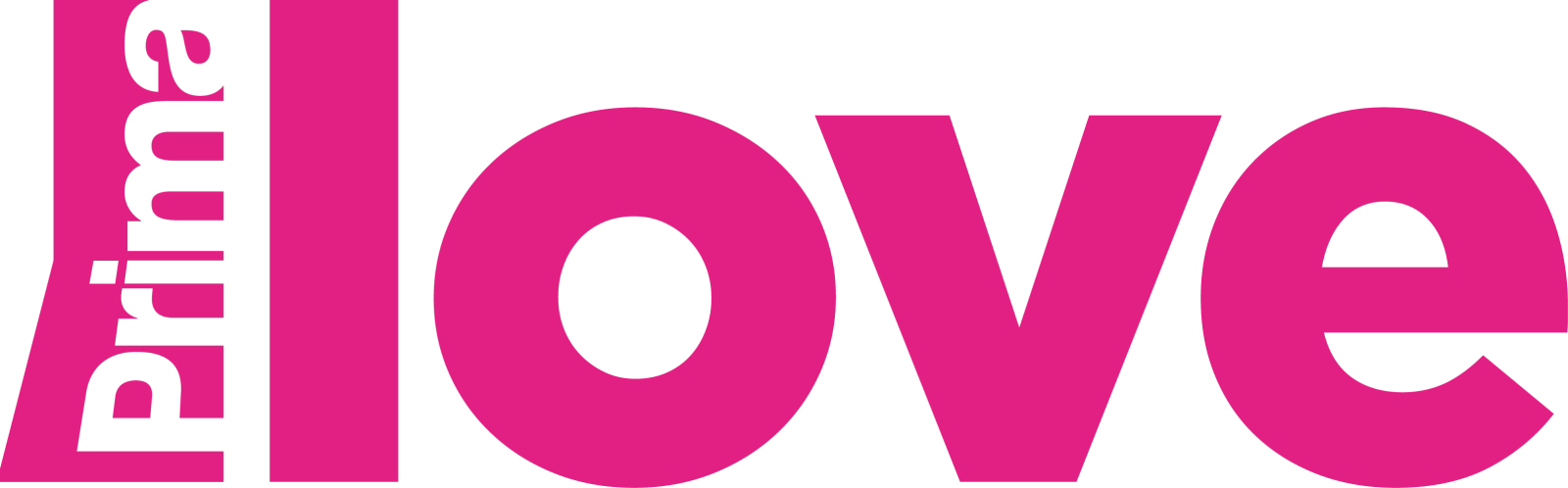
- Country: Czech Republic
- Broadcast area: Czech Republic; Slovakia
- Headquarters: Strašnice, Prague

Programming
- Language: Czech
- Picture format: 16:9/4:3 576i (SDTV); 720p/1080i (HDTV)

Ownership
- Owner: FTV Prima; MTG
- Sister channels: TV Prima; Prima Cool; Prima Krimi; Prima Max; Prima Show; Prima Sport; Prima Star; Prima Zoom; CNN Prima News; Prima SK

History
- Launched: 8 March 2011

Links
- Website: Official website

Availability

Terrestrial
- DVB-T/T2: MUX 22 (FTA)

Streaming media
- Prima+: Watch live (Czech only)

Prima Love is the first niche channel aimed at young, active women in the Czech Republic. The channel, which launched on March 8, 2011, is owned by Modern Times Group and currently has a reach of approximately 94% of the country's 10.5 million people and broadcasts 18 hours per day.

Prima Love showcases top foreign series, soap-operas and movies targeted at young female viewers. This includes MTG's own regionally produced programs such as Czech Rodinná pouta, highly rated US series such as Desperate Housewives, the most popular and newest Latin American soap-operas such as ¿Dónde Está Elisa?, romantic movies targeted at female viewers as well as infotainment shows such as The Oprah Winfrey Show.

The channel wants to extend its programming including highly rated foreign titles as well as gradually delivered locally produced content relevant to its audience.

== Logos ==
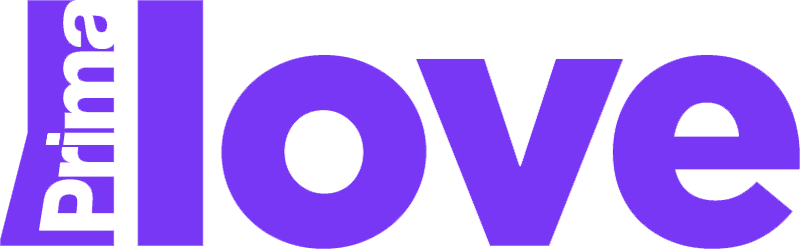
Prima Love second logo from 2013 to 2018

== Telenovelas ==
Original title	Alternate title/Translation	Series Premiere	Series Finale	Second run
(United States) Alguien Te Mira	Someone's Watching	April 5, 2012	September 13, 2012	
(Germany) Alisa – Folge deinem Herzen	Alisa - Follow Your Heart	October 18, 2012	August 20, 2013	
(Turkey) Binbir Gece	Thousand and One Nights	Apríl 2, 2018	June 30, 2018	Apríl 1,2019 - June 30, 2019
(Mexico) Cuidado con el Ángel	Unconventional Angel	January 28, 2013	October 8, 2014	
(United States) Dallas	Dallas	April 25, 2013	December, 2014	
(United States) ¿Dónde Está Elisa?	Elisa, Come Back!	November 17, 2011	April 4, 2012	July 23, 2013 - November 3, 2013
(United States) El Rostro de Analía	The True Face of Passion	March 8, 2011	September 7, 2011	August 30, 2013 - February 2014
(Turkey) Ezel	Ezel	August 20, 2011	April 21, 2012	January 5, 2013 - September 15, 2013
(Mexico) (United States) Marina	Marina	September 8, 2011	February 23, 2012	February 4, 2013 - July 22, 2013
(United States) Más Sabe el Diablo	In The Arms of The Devil	March 8, 2011	November 16, 2011	March 1, 2013 - August 29, 2013
(Mexico) Cuando Seas Mía	Sinful Love	February 24, 2012	October 17, 2012	November 4, 2013 - June 2014 - July 23, 2018, November 18, 2018
(Spain) Velvet	Velvet; Velvet	October 13, 2018	January 2019	2019 - 2020
(Turkey) Dolunay	The flavor of love	November 19, 2018,	December 29, 2018	October 21, 2019 - November 30, 2019
(Mexico) La usurpadora	Two Faces Of Love	December 29, 2018	February 18, 2019 - Apríl 2020	

== MTG's regionally produced programs ==
=== Airing currently ===
- About My Family and Other Corpses
- Ways to Home (all season)

=== Ended ===
- Airport
- Family Ties (all season)
- Ugly Kate
- Very fragile relationships (all season)

== TV series ==
=== Airing currently ===
- Bones
- Castle
- Ghost Whisperer
- Gigolos
- T@gged
- Riverdale
- Light as a Feather
- Grey's Anatomy
- How I Met Your Mother
- In Plain Sight
- Law & Order
- Men in Trees
- Renegade
- Roseanne
- Sex and the City
- The Closer
- The Finder
- The Good Wife
- The L Word
- Trauma
- Weeds

=== Ended ===
- 7th Heaven (season 8)
- A Touch of Frost (all seasons)
- Ally McBeal (all seasons)
- Bent
- Blue Bloods (season 1-2)
- Boston Legal (all seasons)
- Der Bulle von Tölz (all season)
- Desperate Housewives (season 5-8)
- Fairly Legal (all seasons)
- Five Sisters
- Frasier (season 10)
- Free Agents
- G-Spot (all season)
- Glee (seasons 1-3)
- Gossip Girl (seasons 1-5)
- Hot in Cleveland (season 1-3)
- Charmed (all seasons)
- Inspector Rex (season 4-10)
- JAG (all seasons)
- Julie Lescaut (all seasons)
- Life (all seasons)
- Lipstick Jungle (all seasons)
- Lewis (all seasons)
- Love Bites
- Medium (all seasons)
- Mental
- Mercy
- Modern Family (season 1-2)
- Parenthood (seasons 1-3)
- Perfect Couples
- Pretty Little Liars (seasons 1-2)
- Reba (all seasons)
- Revenge (seasons 1)
- Sabrina, the Teenage Witch (all seasons)
- Secret Diary of a Call Girl (season 1-2)
- The Defenders
- The Division (all seasons)
- The Drew Carey Show (all seasons)
- The Ex List
- The Gates
- The Nanny (all seasons)
- The Riches (all seasons)
- White Collar (season 1-3)

== TV shows ==
=== Airing currently ===
- Beauty and the Geek (all seasons)
- Candy Queen (all seasons)
- Hoarding: Buried Alive (all seasons)
- Cheaters (all seasons)
- My Strange Addiction (all seasons)
- Sweet Home Alabama (all seasons)
- Wife Swap USA (season 1-10)
- World's Worst Mom (all seasons)

=== Coming soon ===
- Martha
- The Naked Chef

=== Ended ===
- Ace of Cakes (season 1-2)
- Abby & Brittany
- America's Got Talent (season 7)
- America's Next Top Model (season 1-6)
- Debbie Travis' Facelift (all seasons)
- Extreme Makeover: Weight Loss Edition (season 1)
- Face Off (season 1-2)
- How Clean Is Your House? (all seasons)
- Jamie at Home (all seasons)
- Jamie's Family Christmas
- Jamie's 30 Minute Meals
- Fabulous Cakes (all seasons)
- Fat Chef (season 1)
- Oliver's Twist
- Planet Cake (all seasons)
- Ricardo and Friends (all seasons)
- Shipwrecked (season 1-2)
- Supersize vs Superskinny (season 1-6)
- The F Word
- The Oprah Winfrey Show (season 25)
- The Real Housewives of Beverly Hills (season 1-5)
- The Real Housewives of Orange County (season 1-5)
- The Simple Life (all seasons)
- The Talk (season 1–2)
- The X Factor U.S. (season 2)
- Ultimate Cake Off (all seasons)
- World's Most Wonderful Hotels (season 1-2)
