= Stolpersteine in Prague-Michle =

Memorial installations in Czech Republic

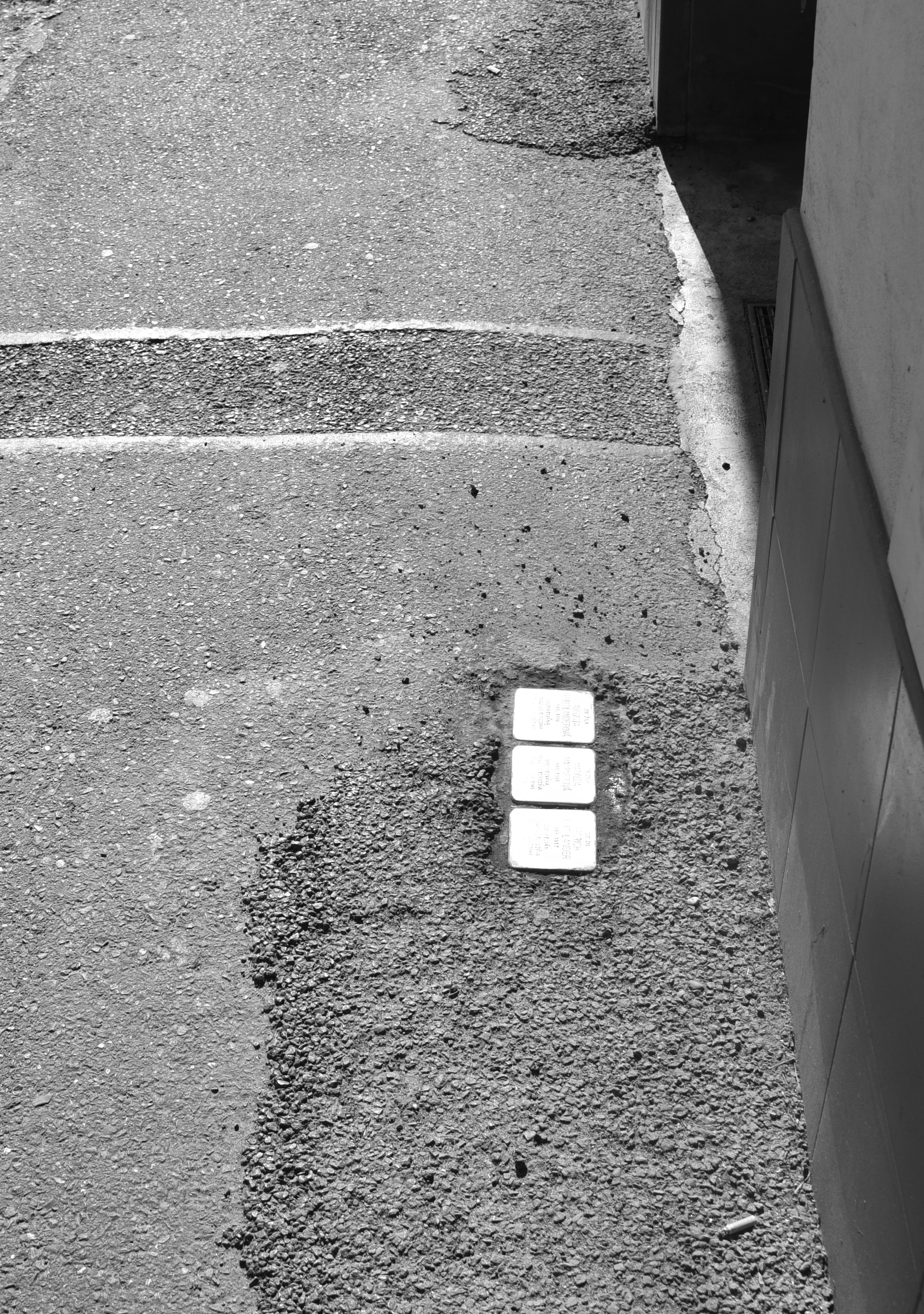
Stolpersteine for Bedřich Friedländer, Augusta Friedländerová and Matylda Mautnerová in Prag-Michle

This article lists the Stolpersteine in cadastral area Michle of Prague. Since 2002, the district belongs to Praha 4. Stolpersteine is the German name for stumbling blocks collocated all over Europe by German artist Gunter Demnig. They remember the fate of the Nazi victims being murdered, deported, exiled or driven to suicide.

Generally, the stumbling blocks are posed in front of the building where the victims had their last self chosen residence. The name of the Stolpersteine in Czech is: Kameny zmizelých, stones of the disappeared.

== Michle ==
Stone	Inscription	Location	Biography
	HERE LIVED; PAVLA BECKMANNOVÁ; BORN 1880; DEPORTED; 1942 TO THERESIENSTADT; 1942 TO RIGA; MURDERED	U Michelského mlýna 101/17; 50°03′16″N 14°27′03″E	Pavla Beckmannová née Fried was born on 27 August 1880 in Lžín. Her parents were Josef Fried and Anna née Weigner. She had a sister named Tonca (later named Svoboda). She married Josef Beckmann. The couple had two sons, Fred (born 1908) and Vilhelm (born 1909). Her husband, born in 1865 in Benešov, died in 1940 in Prague. On 3 August 1942, she was deported from Prague to Theresienstadt concentration camp by transport AAw. Her transport number was 487 of 1,001. On 20 August 1942. she was deported to Riga by transport Bb. Her transport number was 589. None of the 1,001 Jews on this transport survived the Shoah. Both sons survived and she had three grandchildren. Both sons submitted reports on her deportation and her death to Yad Vashem, Vilhelm in 1974 from New York, Fred in 1977 from Los Angeles.
	HERE LIVED; BEDŘICH; FRIEDLANDER; BORN 1917; DEPORTED; 1942 TO THERESIENSTADT; 1942 TO AUSCHWITZ; MURDERED	Michelská 792/2; 50°03′16″N 14°27′10″E	Bedřich Friedländer, also Friedrich, was born on 14 February 1917 in Prague. His parents were Kamil Friedländer (1868-1917) and Augusta née Mauthner (1894-1944). He had an older brother named Leo and a half sister Ella (1896-1914) from a previous marriage of his father. After the sudden death of his father, ten days after Bedřich's birth, his mother had to raise Bedřich on her own. His last address before deportation was in Prague XIV, Michelská 2. On 24 November 1941 he was deported from Prague to Theresienstadt concentration camp by transport Ak. His transport number was 41 of 377. On 6 September 1943 he was deported to Auschwitz concentration camp by transport Dm. His transport number was 2519 . There he lost his life. His mother was murdered in Auschwitz one year later.
	HERE LIVED; AUGUSTA; FRIEDLANDEROVÁ; BORN 1894; DEPORTED; 1942 TO THERESIENSTADT; 1942 TO AUSCHWITZ; MURDERED	Michelská 792/2; 50°03′16″N 14°27′10″E	Auguste Friedländerová née Mautner was born on 4 November 1894 in Klikov, Suchdol nad Lužnicí. Her parents were Josef Mautner and Karolina née Schauer. She had a sister named Hermine. She married Kamil Friedländer (1868-1917). The couple had two sons, Leo and Bedřich (born 1917). Her last address before deportation was in Prague XIV, Michelská 2. On 2 July 1942 she was deported from Prague to Theresienstadt concentration camp by transport AAl. Her transport number was 875 of 1,005. On 23 October 1944 she was deported to Auschwitz concentration camp by transport Et. Her transport number was 756 of 1,714. There she lost her life. Her son Bedřich was murdered in Auschwitz one year earlier.
	HERE LIVED; MATYLDA; MAUTNEROVÁ; BORN 1895; DEPORTED; 1942 TO THERESIENSTADT; 1942 TO AUSCHWITZ; MURDERED	Michelská 792/2; 50°03′16″N 14°27′10″E	Matylda Mautnerová was born on 26 August 1895. Her last address before deportation was in Prague XIV, Michelská 2, where she lived with her relatives Augusta Friedländerová née Mautner and Bedřich Friedländer. On 20 November 1942 she was deported from Prague to Theresienstadt concentration camp by transport Cc. Her transport number was 179 of 1,002. On 18 May 1944 she was deported to Auschwitz concentration camp by transport Eb. Her transport number was 1310 of 2,500. There she lost her life.

== Dates of collocations ==
According to the website of Gunter Demnig the Stolpersteine of Prague were posed on 8 October 2008, 7 November 2009, 12 June 2010, 13 to 15 July 2011 and on 17 July 2013 by the artist himself. A further collocation occurred on 28 October 2012, but is not mentioned on Demnig's page.

The Czech Stolperstein project was initiated in 2008 by the Česká unie židovské mládeže (Czech Union of Jewish Youth) and was realized with the patronage of the Mayor of Prague.

== See also ==
- List of places with Stolpersteine
- Stolpersteine in the Czech Republic
