= Prima Star =

Czech television station

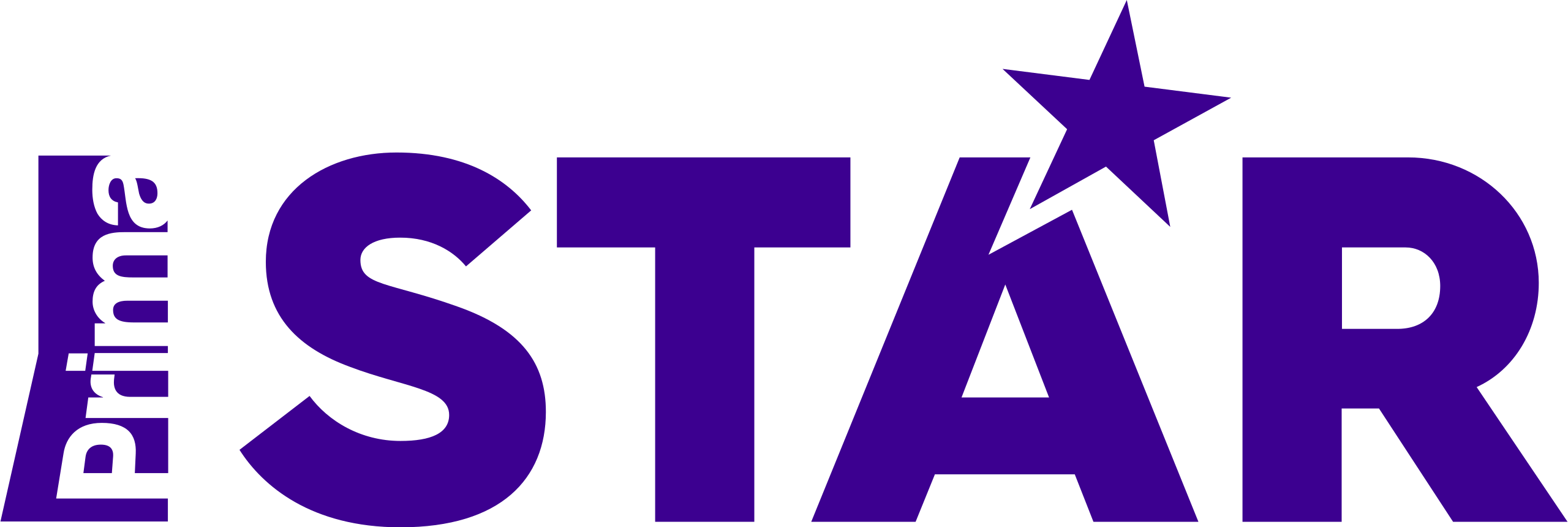
- Country: Czech Republic
- Broadcast area: Czech Republic
- Headquarters: Strašnice, Prague

Programming
- Language: Czech
- Picture format: 16:9/4:3 576i (SDTV); 720p/1080i (HDTV)

Ownership
- Owner: FTV Prima
- Sister channels: TV Prima; Prima Cool; Prima Krimi; Prima Love; Prima Max; Prima Sport; Prima Show; Prima Zoom; CNN Prima News; Prima SK

History
- Launched: 14 June 2021

Links
- Website: Official website

Availability

Terrestrial
- DVB-T/T2: MUX 22 (FTA)

Streaming media
- Prima+: Watch live (Czech only)

Prima Star is a Czech television channel of the FTV Prima group. The channel is primarily focused on its own archival entertainment programs and dramatic productions.

== History ==
On 1 April 2021, FTV Prima submitted an application for a license to broadcast a new program, which was approved by the Council for Radio and Television Broadcasting at a meeting on May 4, and which is valid for 12 years. On 1 June at 10:00 a.m., a promo loop was launched on the "Test-1" position in DVB-T2 Multiplex 22. The regular broadcast began on Monday, 14 June 2021 at 10:35 a.m.

== Broadcast ==
The station is available on digital terrestrial broadcast in Multiplex 22. For one month, it was offered exclusively by T-Mobile in its IPTV service T-Mobile TV in position #18 and also in its satellite television T-Mobile SAT TV. From July 14, it is available in IPTV services SledovaniTV and O2 TV. In the future, Prima Star will also be available with other operators.
