= Prima Krimi =

Czech television station

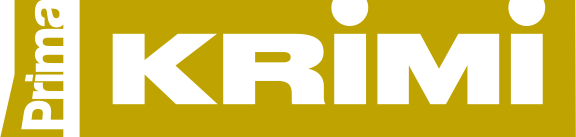
- Country: Czech Republic
- Broadcast area: Czech Republic; Slovakia
- Headquarters: Strašnice, Prague

Programming
- Language: Czech
- Picture format: 16:9/4:3 576i (SDTV); 720p/1080i (HDTV)

Ownership
- Owner: FTV Prima
- Sister channels: TV Prima; Prima Cool; Prima Love; Prima Max; Prima Show; Prima Sport; Prima Star; Prima Zoom; CNN Prima News; Prima SK

History
- Launched: 2 April 2018

Links
- Website: Official website

Availability

Terrestrial
- DVB-T/T2: MUX 22 (FTA)

Streaming media
- Prima+: Watch live (Czech only)

Prima Krimi is a FTV Prima channel that launched on 2 April 2018. It is focused on various foreign series and films, such as Midsomer Murders, Bones, Castle, NCIS: Los Angeles or American Crime Story. The CEO of FTV Prima, Marek Singr, said that he hopes for a greater thematic diversity of the group's channels from the new channel. The Prima Krimi channel mainly influenced Prima Love, another channel of the group, which began to focus more on women's series and soap operas, with detective stories represented on Prima Krimi.

Prima Krimi broadcasts nationwide in Multiplex 22. The program is included in most cable networks, IPTV and satellite platforms.
