= State Opera =

State Opera may refer to:

- Bavarian State Opera, Munich, Germany
- Berlin State Opera
- Hamburg State Opera
- Staatsoper Hannover
- Sächsische Staatsoper Dresden
- Hungarian State Opera House
- Vienna State Opera
- Prague State Opera
