= Prima Max =

Czech television station

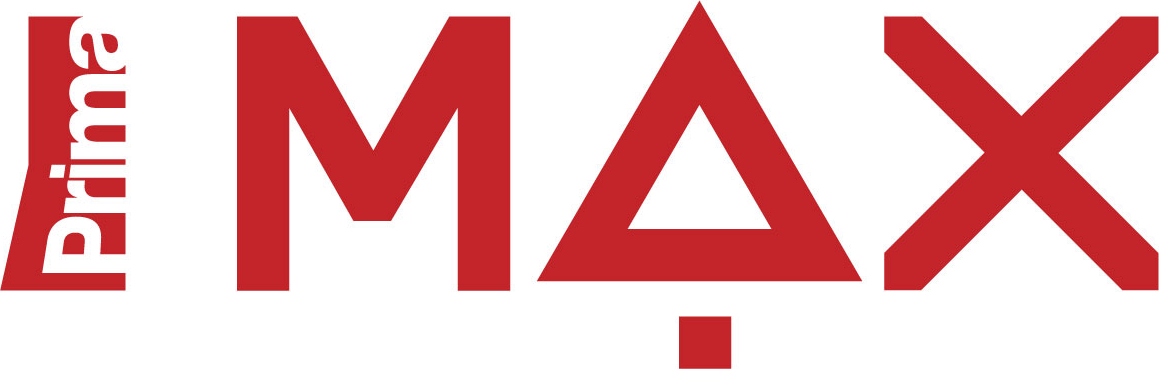
- Country: Czech Republic
- Broadcast area: Czech Republic
- Headquarters: Strašnice, Prague

Programming
- Language: Czech
- Picture format: 16:9/4:3 576i (SDTV); 720p/1080i (HDTV)

Ownership
- Owner: FTV Prima
- Sister channels: TV Prima; Prima Cool; Prima Krimi; Prima Love; Prima Show; Prima Sport; Prima Star; Prima Zoom; CNN Prima News; Prima SK

History
- Launched: 20 November 2015

Links
- Website: Official website

Availability

Terrestrial
- DVB-T/T2: MUX 22 (FTA)

Streaming media
- Prima+: Watch live (Czech only)

Prima Max is the fifth TV channel of Prima televize, which started broadcasting on Friday 20 November 2015, at 20:11. The channel obtained a license for a period of 12 years. The first broadcast film was the American film The Wolf of Wall Street.

== Program ==
The station's program is primarily aimed at viewers aged 25–45 and at parents with children, focusing mainly on foreign productions. There are also reruns of some of Prima's own shows from the main channel.

== Rating ==
The average share of the new channel reached over 2% in the 15+ audience group and over 3% in the 15-54 group in the first days of broadcasting.

The film The Wolf of Wall Street was seen by 135 thousand viewers. The second evening, 121,000 viewers watched the premiere of Total Recall.
