= Evangelical Cemetery (Strašnice) =

- Evangelický hřbitov ve Strašnicích
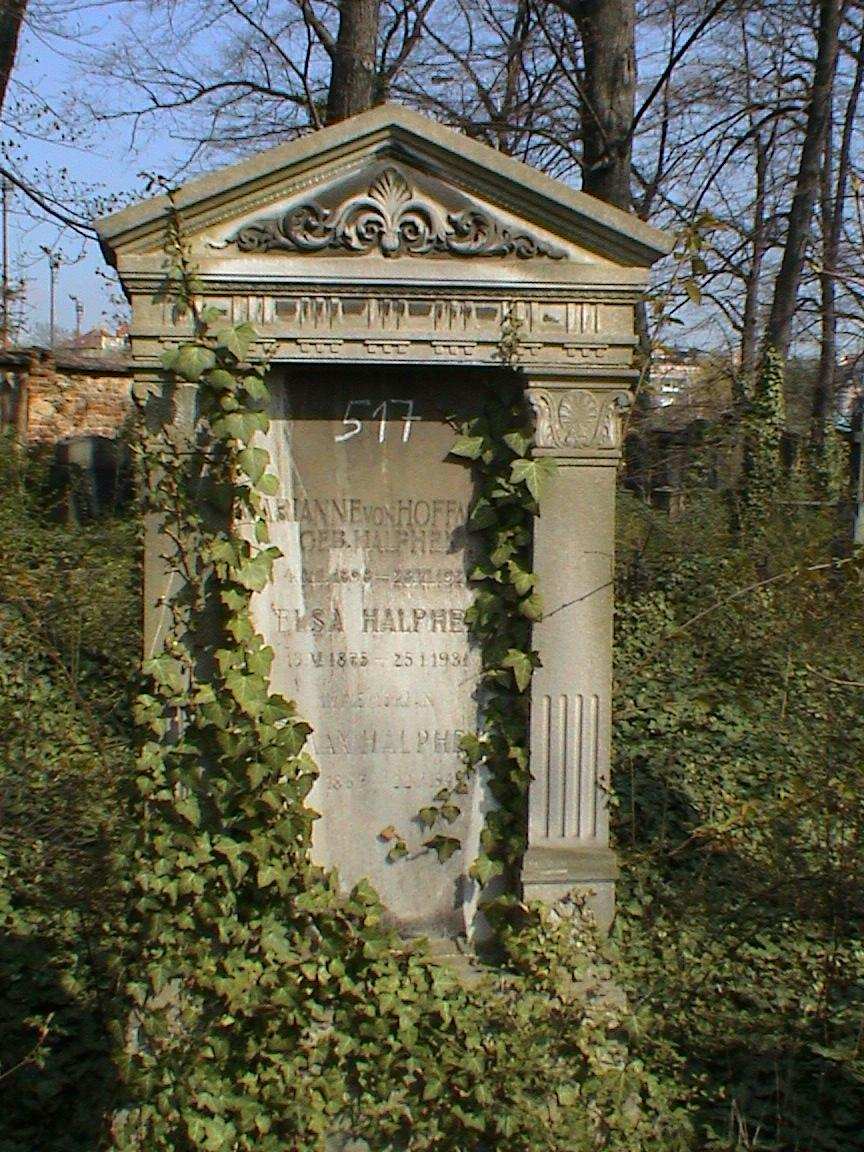
- a gravestone
- Interactive map of the Evangelical Cemetery (Strašnice) area

General information
- Location: Prague 10, Czech Republic
- Coordinates: 50.078°N 14.485°E

Evangelical Cemetery (Czech: Evangelický hřbitov) is a former cemetery that was used mainly by German Protestants in Prague from 1795 to the end of the Second World War.

== History ==
The cemetery is thought to have been started around 1795 although the oldest legible gravestone dates from 1828. The cemetery was officially closed in 1950, but it had been effectively closed since 1945.

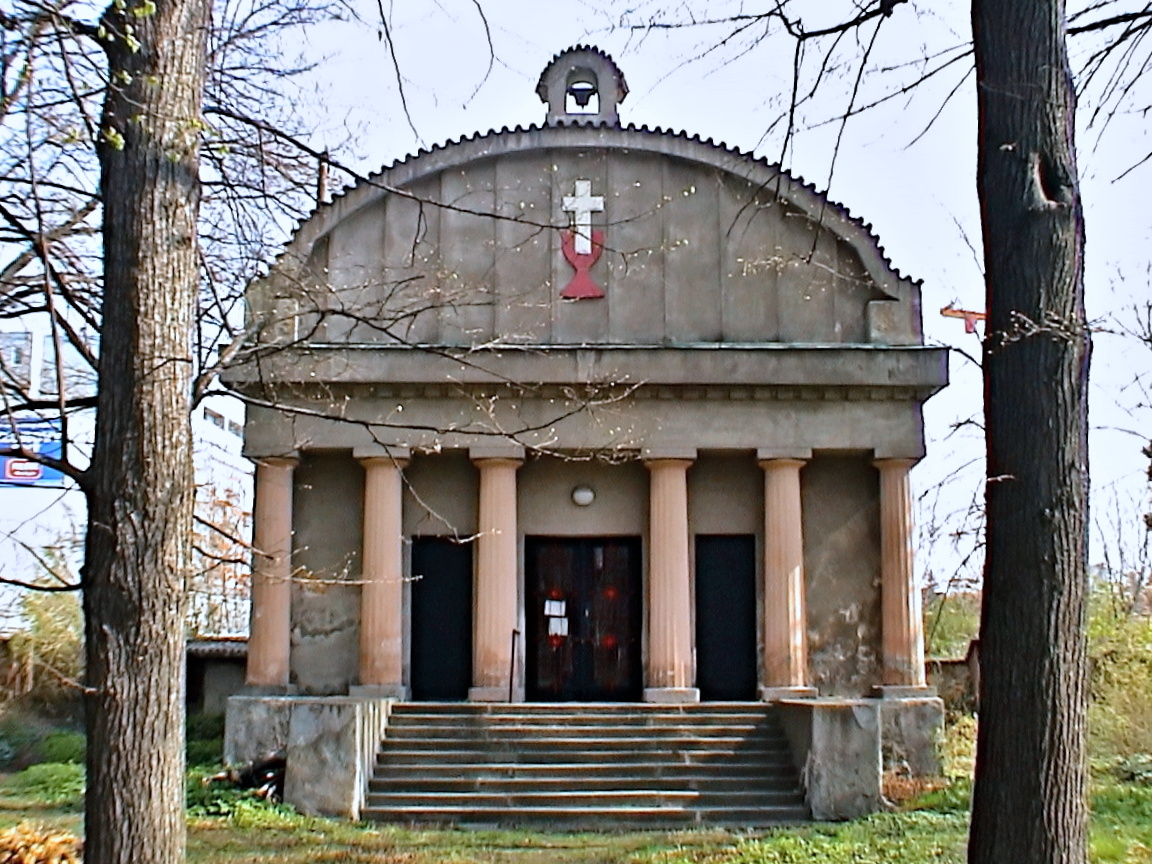
The chapel at the cemetery

In 1955 the chapel at the cemetery was given to the Czech Hussite Church. Three years later there was a failed plan to re-use the ground for sports and for public recreation.

In 1998 there were over 600 tombs.

In 2000 it was announced that soldiers of the German Wehrmacht were to be re-buried here from an existing common grave.

== Notable burials ==
The opera singer Wilhelm Elsner, the railway engineer August Gröbe, the composer Ludwig Grünberger and Dr. Hugo Rex are buried here.
