= Vlasta Neighborhood =

- Sídliště Vlasta
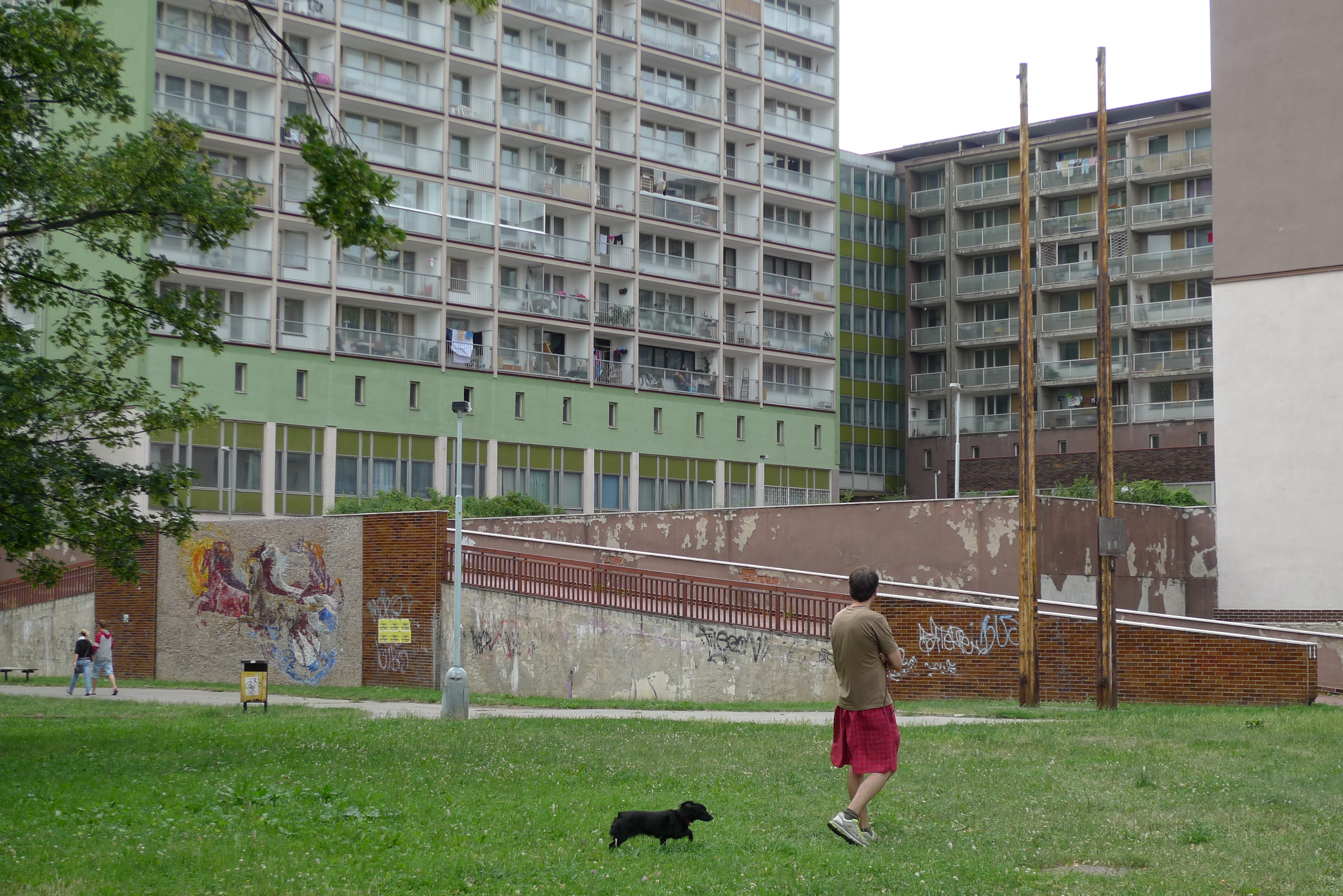
- Interactive map of the Vlasta Neighborhood area

General information
- Type: Resident Houses
- Location: Prague, Czech Republic
- Coordinates: 50°04′04″N 14°27′51″E
- Construction started: 1972
- Completed: 1977
- Owner: City of Prague
- Operator: Prague 10

Vlasta Neighborhood (Czech: Sídliště Vlasta) is a set of buildings in Prague 10-Vršovice, Czech Republic. It was constructed across from the Koh-i-noor Waldes factory between 1972 and 1977. There are residential buildings and the seat of the Municipality of Prague 10. The buildings were established as a quick fix solution following the Warsaw Pact invasion of Czechoslovakia in 1968 for residents of the evacuated town of Milovice.
