= Prima televize =

Czech television station

Prima
- Logo used since 2013
- Country: Czech Republic
- Broadcast area: Czech Republic

Programming
- Language: Czech
- Picture format: 16:9/4:3 576i (SDTV); 720p/1080i (HDTV)
- Timeshift service: Prima +1

Ownership
- Owner: FTV Prima; GME; MTG
- Sister channels: Prima Cool; Prima Krimi; Prima Love; Prima Max; Prima Show; Prima Sport; Prima Star; Prima Zoom; CNN Prima News; Prima SK

History
- Launched: 26 November 1992 (test broadcast); 20 June 1993; 33 years ago (official broadcast)
- Former names: FTV Premiéra (1992–1994); Premiéra TV (1994–96); Prima Televize (1997–2012); Prima Family (2012–2013)

Links
- Webcast: Prima on iPrima.cz (Czech only)

Availability

Terrestrial
- DVB-T/T2: MUX 22 (FTA)

Streaming media
- Prima+: Watch live (Czechia only)

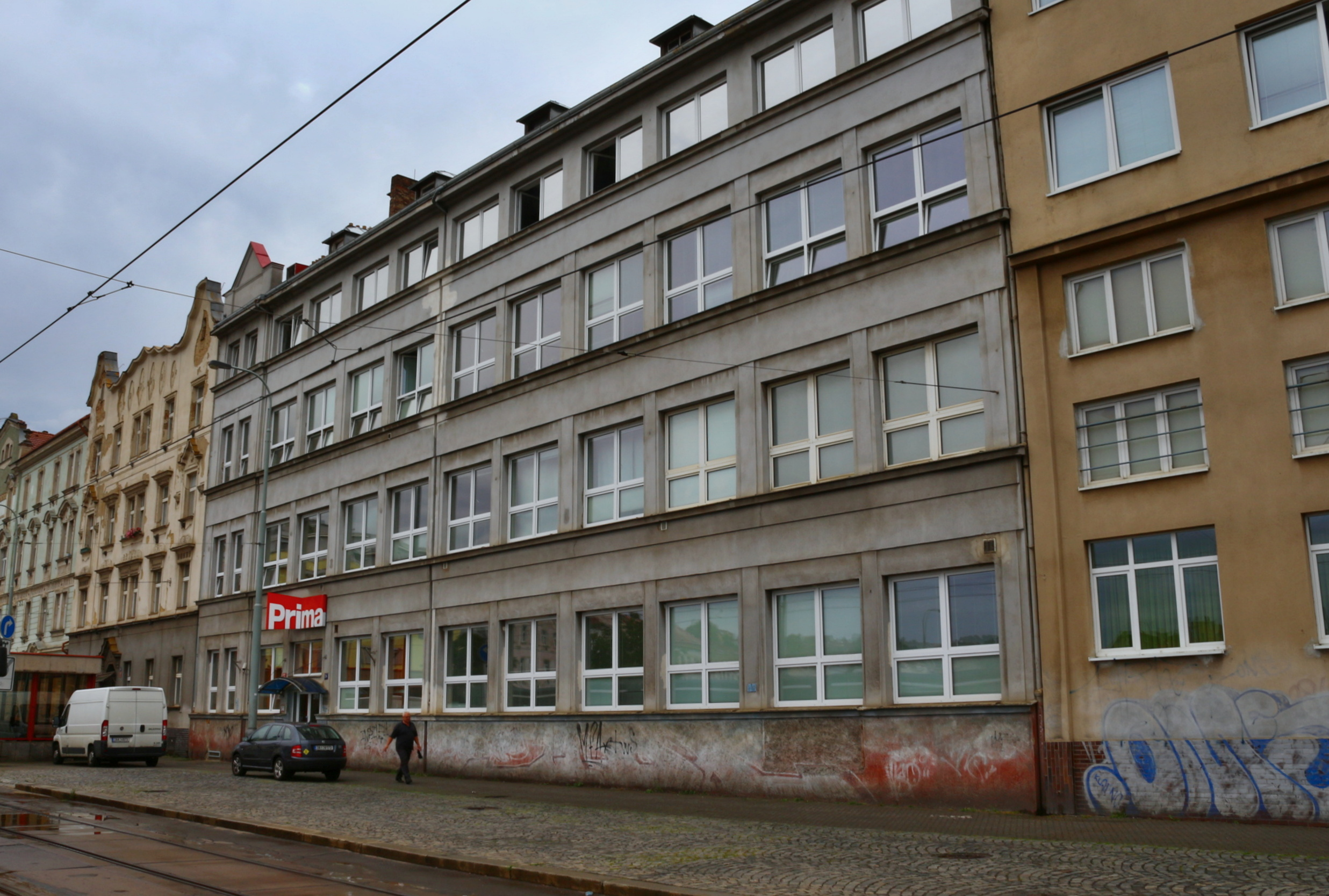
Na Žertvách of the former FTV Prima building.

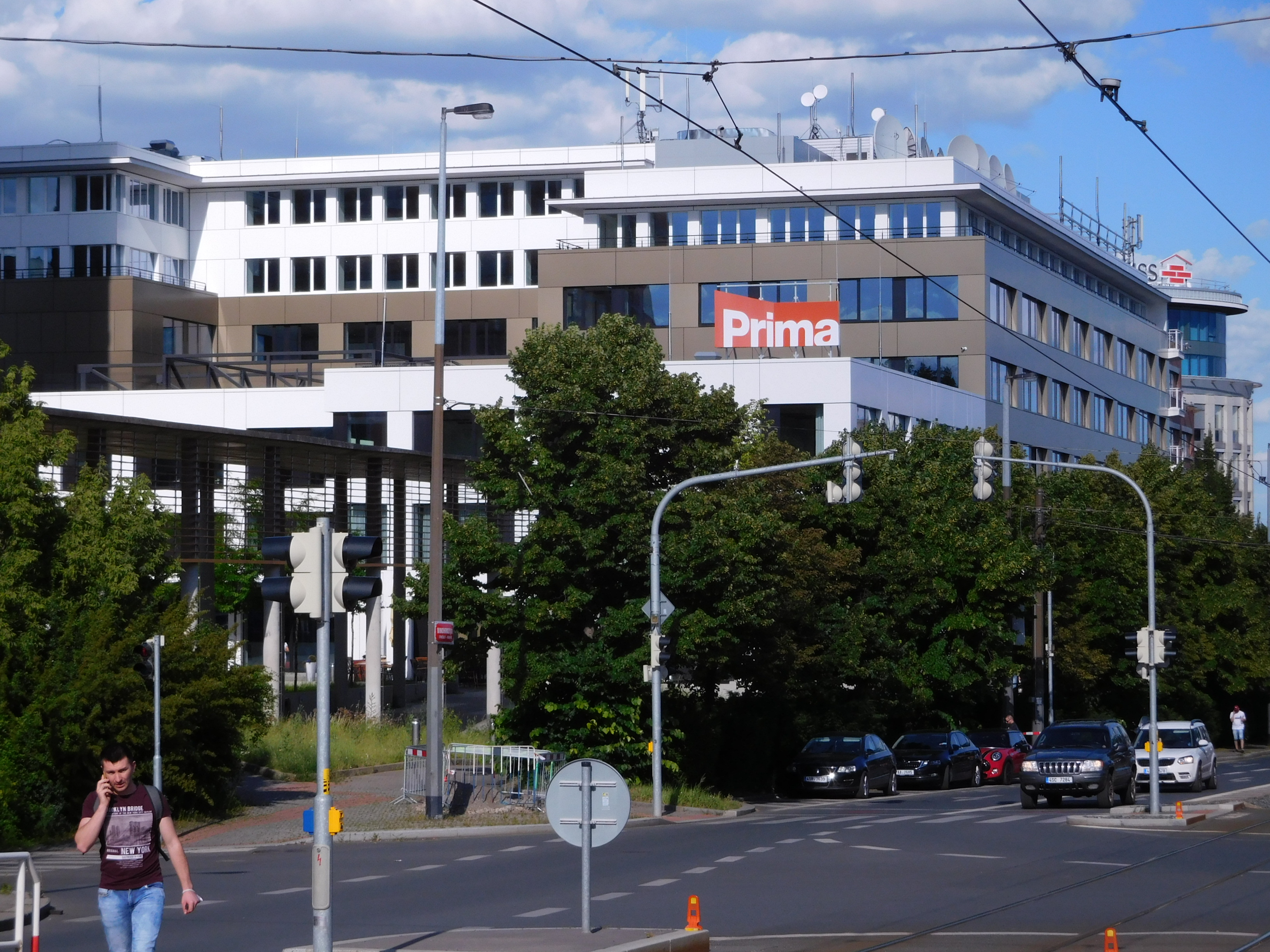
Building of FTV Prima at Strašnice quarter of Prague

TV Prima, also known simply as Prima (previously Prima family, Prima televize, Premiéra, originally FTV Premiéra), is a Czech television channel based in Prague. Its current owner is FTV Prima, spol. s. r. o., which is majority-owned by Czech investment firm GES, in turn owned by Czech oligarch Ivan Zach. The group's current general manager is Marek Singer. It is the first private TV channel in the Czech Republic and the former Czechoslovakia.

== History ==
FTV Prima's history began when FTV Premiéra obtained the first ever privately owned TV license in Czechoslovakia on November 26, 1992, and its official broadcast began on June 20, 1993 in the Czech Republic. Through its first year, the channel only broadcast to the Prague metropolitan area, with a mix of regional programming and imported American TV series dubbed into Czech, such as The A-Team.

Some months later, FTV Premiéra was allowed to expand its coverage to a national audience using the facilities of other privately owned regional TV services which were being licensed by the Broadcasting Council. Some local broadcasters were not satisfied with this proposal and complained about the council's action, as they would be limited by broadcast time and Premiéra could have a hand on the allocation of licences. The Prime Minister's office rejected the accusations, as the intervention of FTV Premiéra was supposed to help them with funding and at the same time increase viewership.

On June 28, 1994, Premiéra became licensed to uplink its signal into the Hot Bird satellite, allowing the broadcaster to expand its coverage nationwide. By early 1995, coverage was expanded into the Liberec-Ještěd, Zlín-Tlustá hora, Ostrava-Hošťálkovice and Plzeň-Krkavec, however, the much-promised satellite uplink into the Hot Bird satellite was postponed. Eventually, the FTV Premiéra signal was uplinked into the DFS Kopernikus-2 satellite at 28.5 ° E, on the morning of Friday, June 9, 1995. This satellite signal formally made Premiéra a de facto fourth national network, and was intended primarily as a distribution signal for local transmitters and cable television. The signal would be encrypted on August 1, when formal transmissions on satellite officially began.

However, FTV Premiéra suffered from the beginning of its national broadcast, as TV Nova had caught Premiéra into a headstart, and its programming was being considered as inferior and unattractive compared to the innovative and brash programming offered by its new private competitor. As a result, and as part of an ongoing complaint from Premiere (now Sky Deutschland) over FTV Premiéra's name being too similar to the former, on October 15, 1996, the broadcaster announced a major relaunch from January 10, 1997, including a new programming concept centered in a family-friendly schedule, and the renaming of the broadcaster as Prima televíze, with a new brand designed by Novocom. The new management, led by Kateřina Fričová, distanced itself from Nova's aggressive programming concept by increasing the production of original series and shows and the broadcast of very popular classic TV series, mostly of American origin. Prima is also well known for broadcasting German and French crime series..

The broadcaster also began to expand its coverage and ended its relationship with some local channels, allowing Prima to expand using its own infrastructure, still with the obligation to broadcast some regional programmes. In 2001, Prima launched a broadcast from Klínovec, thus increasing its coverage to 72.3% of the country and setting its first records in viewership. New programming would help Prima to become a factor in the ratings, and, by 2003, FTV Prima's broadcasting license was extended until 2018.

In 2005, Prima became the first broadcaster in Czech Republic to offer a reality show, an adaptation of the successful Hungarian format Való Világ, under the name Vy Volení. The show marked the first Czech-Slovak collaboration between Prima and TV JOJ, which, at the time, was beefing up its programming concept after distancing from its former owner (and Prima's competitor) Nova. To launch the show, Prima made a headstart and launched the show one week before Nova's adaptation of Big Brother. This strategy would work for Prima as it would reach 2,2 million viewers on the final episode of its first season; in contrast, Nova's Big Brother was promptly canceled after just one season.

The success of Vy Volení helped the channel to establish itself as a competitor to Nova and the public Czech Television channels, and also a target for acquisition. In 2005, Modern Times Group bought a majority 50% shareholding in the broadcaster, and helped Prima to diversify and improve its programming. It began acquiring more recent American TV shows, like Grey's Anatomy, Desperate Housewives, Bones, Heroes, The Closer, Medium, Criminal Minds, Monk, and acquired exclusive rights to UEFA Euro 2008. The channel also got new graphics in 2007, with a new 3D logo designed by Dream On, which is still used to date.

By 2009, Prima launched its first ever thematic channel, Prima Cool, aimed at a young male target audience, with a heavy level of acquired TV series and shows, like The Big Bang Theory, The Simpsons or Top Gear. Two years later, Prima launched Prima Love, aimed at a female audience. It also continued its collaboration with Slovakia's TV JOJ and launched a joint Czech-Slovak version of the Got Talent franchise.

On October 31, 2011, FTV Prima CEO Marek Singer announced the cancellation of the licence of the main Prima channel, valid until 2018, and plans to replace it with a new one. The reason of the cancellation was to drop its obligations to broadcast regional programming, which had caused them problems in recent years. On January 1, 2012, Prima switched to a new licence and was renamed as Prima family, being named as such as Prima was widely considered by Czechs as a family-oriented television service. The newly licensed channel took over the frequency at 4:47am and was launched at 6am with a special New Year's Day presentation of Finding Nemo.

At the same time, Martin Konrád replaced Singer as managing director, and the channel began promoting Obchoďák, a TV series which was advertised as the biggest and most expensive production ever made on Czech television. Although the series was ordered with two seasons in mind, it was canceled at the end of the first season due to low ratings.

In February 2013, Prima launched a third thematic channel, Prima Zoom, which focused on documentary programming. Part of the programming would be made in collaboration with MTG's documentary channels. By August 2013, as a measure to address some woes which had hampered the station's ratings, Prima family was renamed Prima, thus returning the channel to its original name. It also revived the Vy Volení reality show, in collaboration, once again, with TV JOJ, however, the new season was ultimately unsuccessful and it would be later canceled. However, it would continue to collaborate with TV JOJ for additional shows, like the local adaptation of the Got Talent franchise, and even acquiring the rights to The X Factor.

By 2013, Konrád was displaced and Singer returned as CEO of FTV Prima. He would return the channel to a more family-friendly approach, by launching more original series, some of which would become successful. Between 2015 and 2017, Prima launched three additional channels: Prima MAX, focusing on films, Prima Comedy Central, in association with the American cable TV channel (renamed Paramount Network in 2021), and Prima Krimi, which focused exclusively on crime-related TV series and documentaries. Additionally, FTV Prima launched a Slovakia-specific channel, Prima PLUS, which only airs originally-produced content to comply with Slovak regulations.

In 2017, the FTV Prima group was sold by Modern Times Group and acquired by Czech oligarch Ivan Zach, through the Denemo Media subsidiary of its investment company GES. At the same time, FTV Prima announced a partnership with CNN International, resulting on the launch of CNN Prima News, the first major competitor to ČT24. Prima would beef up its news service in the round-up to the launch of the new channel, ultimately delayed to 2020. The main Prima channel also acquired rights to the successful Masked Singer franchise, in collaboration, once again, with TV JOJ; however, the COVID-19 pandemic delayed the launch of both ventures. Ultimately, CNN Prima News would launch on May 3, 2020, with its main morning and early evening newscasts being broadcast simultaneously on the main Prima channel; although it has been unable to establish itself as a competitor to ČT24, it has since made some progress in the ratings. The local version of the Masked Singer franchise, although heavily marketed at its launch, would eventually become unsuccessful, and then cancelled after just one season of 10 shows.

In May 2021, the channel launched an additional niche channel, Prima STAR, which is a competitor to similarly themed channel Nova Gold. The channel, only available in SD, offers rebroadcasts of popular FTV Prima shows aired through the station's history. And In October 2021, brand new channel reality show program Prima SHOW.

== Sister channels ==
Logo	Name of Channel	Launch Year	Theme
	Prima COOL	2009 (Czech); 2024 (Slovakia)	Teenagers
	Prima LOVE	2011 (Czech); 2024 (Slovakia)	Women
	Prima ZOOM	2013	Documentary
	Prima MAX	2015	Movies
	Prima SK	2017	The Slovak version of FTV Prima
	Prima KRIMI	2018 (Czech); 2025 (Slovakia)	Crime
	CNN Prima NEWS	2020	News
	Prima STAR	2021	Archive
	Prima SHOW	2021	Reality
	Prima sport	2026	Sports

== Controversy ==
The network has been criticised for its biased anti-migrant position during the European migrant crisis.

== Logos ==
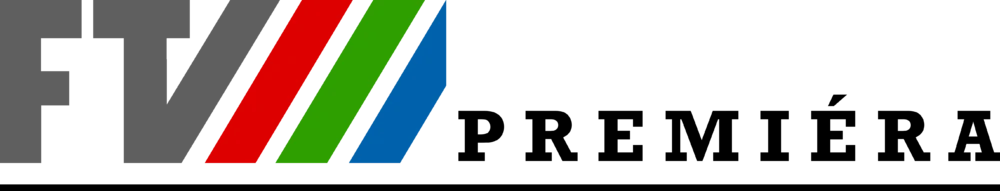
Logo test transmission FTV Premiéra from 1992 to 1994

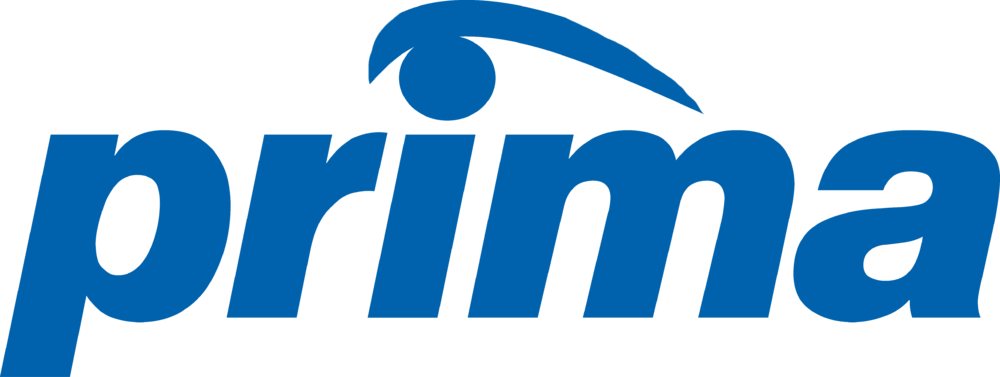
First logo FTV Prima from 1997 to 2005

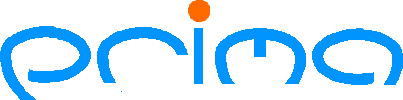
Second logo FTV Prima from 2005 to 2008

Third logo first era from 2008 to 2012

Logo Prima Family from 2012 to 2013
