= Vršovice Savings Bank Building =

- Vršovická záložna
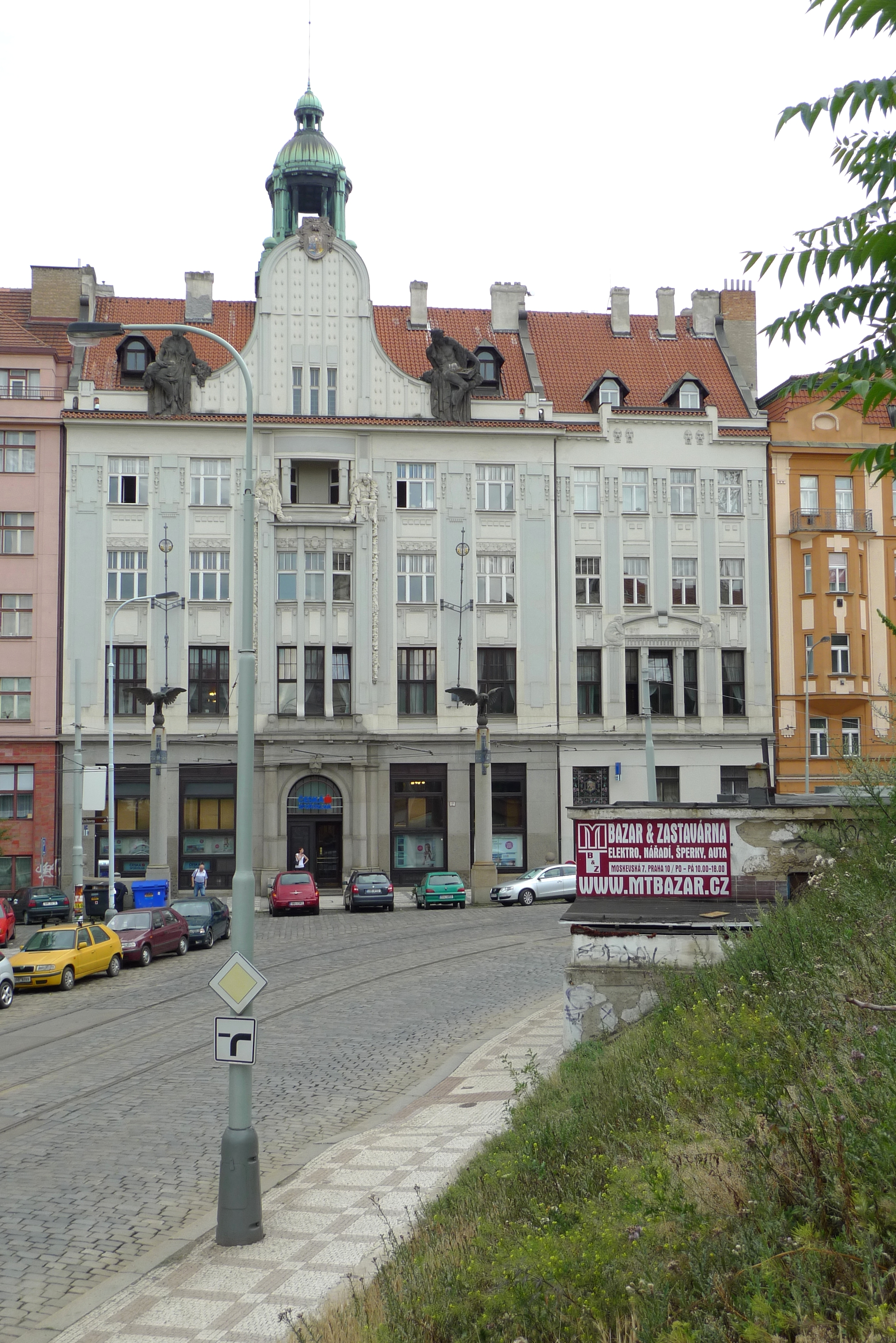
- Interactive map of the Vršovice Savings Bank Building area

General information
- Type: bank
- Location: Prague, Czech Republic
- Coordinates: 50.071986°N 14.451495°E
- Construction started: 1911
- Owner: Česká spořitelna, Czech Republic

Technical details
- Floor count: 4

Design and construction
- Architect: Antonín Balšánek

Vršovice Savings Bank Building (Czech: Vršovická záložna or Vršovická spořitelna) is an Art Nouveau building, which is located in Prague 10-Vršovice. The architect of the building was Antonin Balšánek.

== Description ==
Antonin Balšánek designed this Art Nouveau building which incorporates several notable statues. On the front are two by the Czech sculptor Ladislav Šaloun. The building also includes work by sculptors Josef Mařatka and František Uprka.

This building was opened to the public in September 2012 as part of the European Heritage Days initiative.
