= CNN Prima News =

Czech television station

- Country: Czech Republic
- Broadcast area: Czech Republic; Slovakia
- Affiliates: CNN International

Programming
- Language: Czech
- Picture format: 16:9/4:3 576i (SDTV); 720p/1080i (HDTV)

Ownership
- Owner: FTV Prima
- Sister channels: TV Prima; Prima Cool; Prima Krimi; Prima Love; Prima Max; Prima Show; Prima Sport; Prima Star; Prima Zoom; Prima SK

History
- Launched: 3 May 2020; 6 years ago

Links
- Website: Official website

Availability

Terrestrial
- DVB-T/T2: MUX 22 (FTA)

Streaming media
- CNN Prima NEWS: Watch live (Czech only)

CNN Prima News (stylized as CNN Prima NEWS) is a Czech 24-hour television news channel operated by FTV Prima. It began broadcasting on 3 May 2020 as part of a partnership between the Prima Group and Skydance's CNN International. Under the agreement, Prima operates the channel and uses the CNN brand while receiving access to CNN content, training and other services.

The partnership was announced in April 2019. CNN Prima News is distributed in the Czech Republic and is also available through pay television in Slovakia. In April 2025, Prima and CNN International extended their agreement for another five years.

== News production ==
CNN Prima News provides continuous news coverage alongside current-affairs, interview and discussion programmes. Domestic reporting is produced by FTV Prima's newsroom, which also supplies news content to other Prima television channels and the group's online platforms. International coverage draws on news, footage and programmes supplied through Prima's partnership with CNN.
