= Prima Zoom =

Czech television station

Prima ZOOM
- Country: Czech Republic

Programming
- Language: Czech
- Picture format: 16:9/4:3 576i (SDTV); 720p/1080i (HDTV)

Ownership
- Owner: FTV Prima; MTG
- Sister channels: TV Prima; Prima Cool; Prima Krimi; Prima Love; Prima Max; Prima Show; Prima Sport; Prima Star; CNN Prima News; Prima SK

History
- Launched: 1 February 2013

Links
- Website: Official website

Availability

Terrestrial
- DVB-T/T2: MUX 22 (FTA)

Streaming media
- Prima ZOOM Online: Watch live (Czech only)
- Prima+: Watch live (Czech only)

Prima ZOOM is a documentary television channel of FTV Prima group. Prima ZOOM was launched on 1 February 2013, complementing its sister channels Prima Family, Prima COOL, and Prima Love.

Prima ZOOM's graphics identity was made by Studio Oficina, as it did also with Prima Love and Prima COOL. Its graphics and logo are based on the gesture pinch-to-zoom.

Prima ZOOM broadcasts daily between 08.00 and 02.00. The channel is available in the Czech digital terrestrial network (like other channels of FTV Prima group) in multiplex 3 (like Prima Love), as well as in the basic packages of a number of satellite, cable, and IPTV pay-TV operators, and had a household penetration of well over 90% when it launched.
