= Rangherka =

Rangherka - Vršovice Castle
- Rangherka - Vršovický zámeček
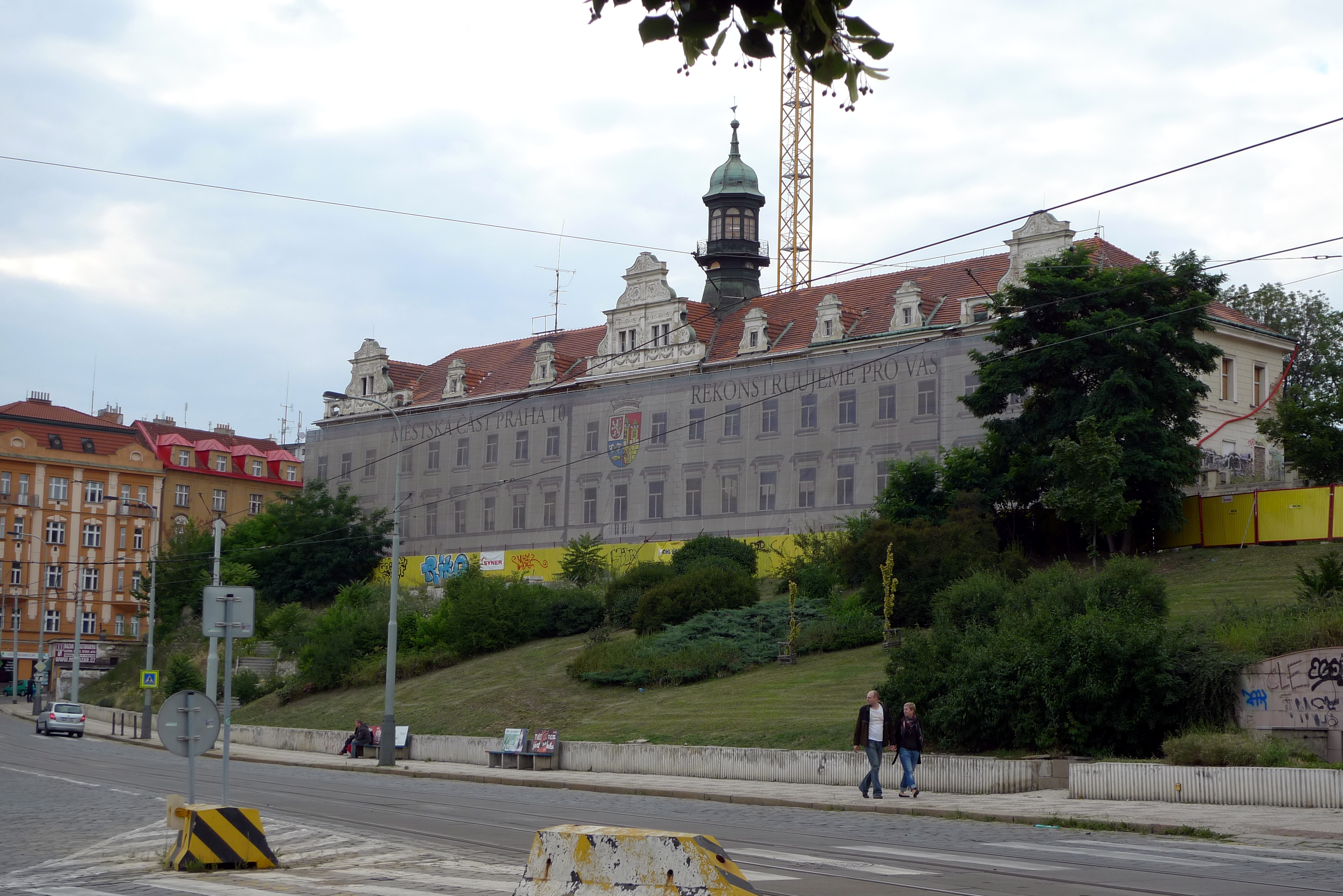
- Interactive map of the Rangherka - Vršovice Castle area

General information
- Type: Former silk factory, castle, city hall
- Location: Vršovické náměstí, Moskevská 120/21, Prague, Czech Republic, 101 00
- Coordinates: 50.0698°N 14.4524°E
- Construction started: 1870s
- Owner: City of Prague, Czech Republic
- Management: Prague 10

Technical details
- Floor count: 3

Rangherka (Rangheri House), also called Vršovický zámeček (Vršovice Castle) is a former silk factory, today Neo-Renaissance representative building from the 19th century, which stands in Vršovice in Prague 10, Czech Republic. The building is named after its first owner Giuseppe Rangheri, a silk maker. Today, the building is a state-protected cultural monument.
