= Wilhelm Elsner =

German opera singer

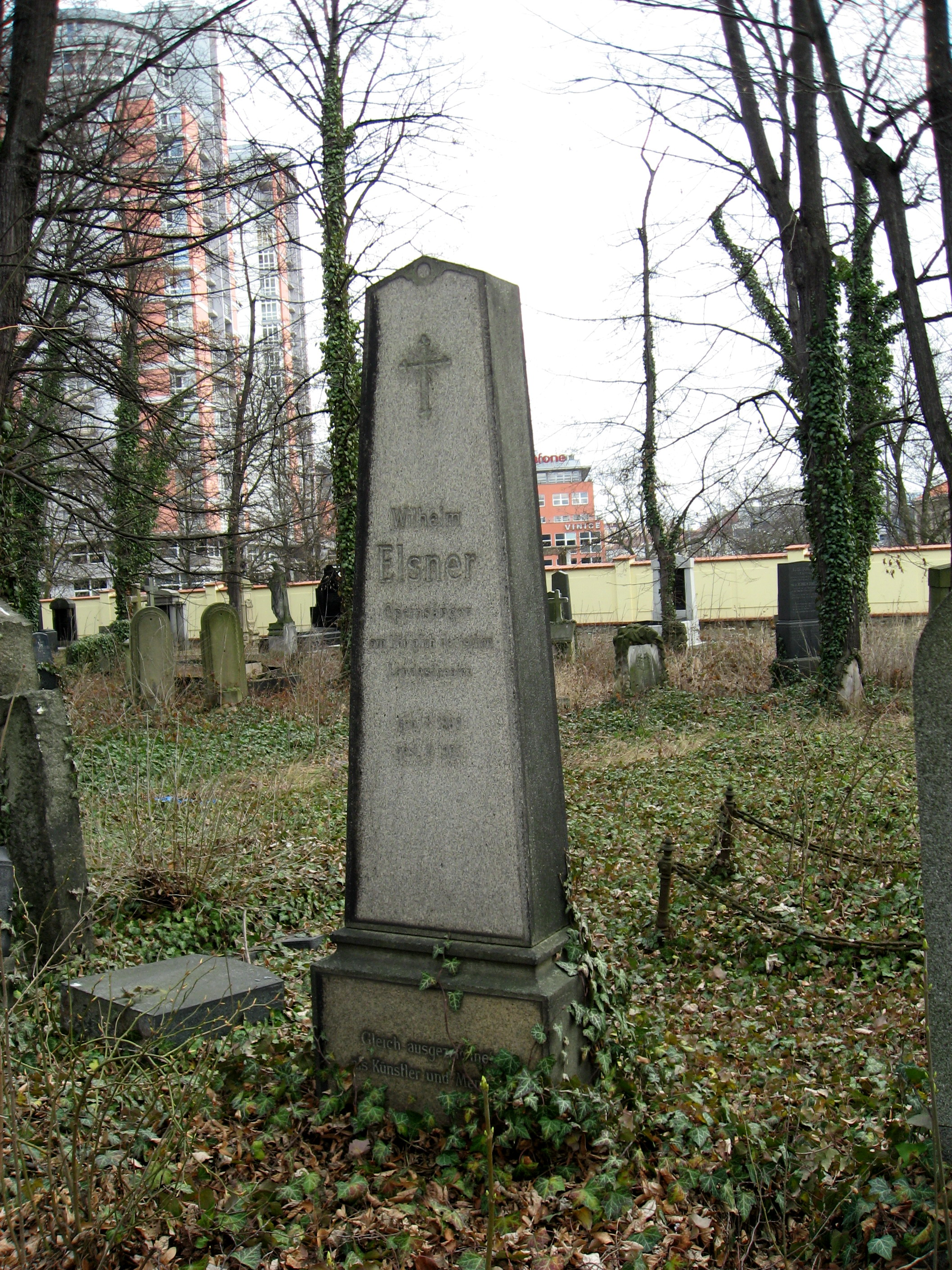
Elsner's grave at the Evangelical Cemetery in Prague-Strašnice.

Wilhelm Elsner (10 November 1869- 26 August 1903) was a German operatic tenor who had an active international career from 1889 to 1903. Although his initial success was primarily in the lyric repertoire, he eventually became highly regarded for his portrayals of Wagnerian heroes.

== Biography ==
Born in Brno, Elsner received his training in his native city from Hermann Pfeiffer before making his professional opera debut in 1889 at the opera house of Linz. He remained active at the house until 1891 when he joined Theater Regensburg for the 1891-1892 season. He performed at the opera house in Graz from 1892 to 1896, where he notably sang the title role in the 1893 world premiere of Siegmund von Hausegger's Helfrid.

In 1896, Elsner joined the roster of principal singers at the Neues Deutsches Theater in Prague where he was committed until his death. His initial parts at that house were lyrical roles like Don Ottavio in Don Giovanni and the title role in Charles Gounod's Faust. He expanded into the dramatic repertoire, assailing a number of Wagner roles like Loge in Das Rheingold, the title role in Lohengrin, Siegmund in Die Walküre, and Walther in Die Meistersinger von Nürnberg. He was particularly loved for his Tristan in Tristan und Isolde. In 1903 he appeared in the world premiere of Cesare Rossi's Nadeya.

As a guest artist, Elsner appeared at the Vienna State Opera (1899), the Bavarian State Opera (1902), the Semperoper (1902), and the Opern- und Schauspielhaus Frankfurt (1902), mostly in Wagner roles. At the time of his sudden death in Prague in August 1903, he was in negotiations to join the roster of singers at the Bavarian State Opera. He was also supposed to sing the role of Pedro in the world premiere of Eugen d'Albert's Tiefland the following November.
