= Parish Congregation of the Evangelical Church (Prague 10) =

- Farní sbor Českobratrské církve evangelické
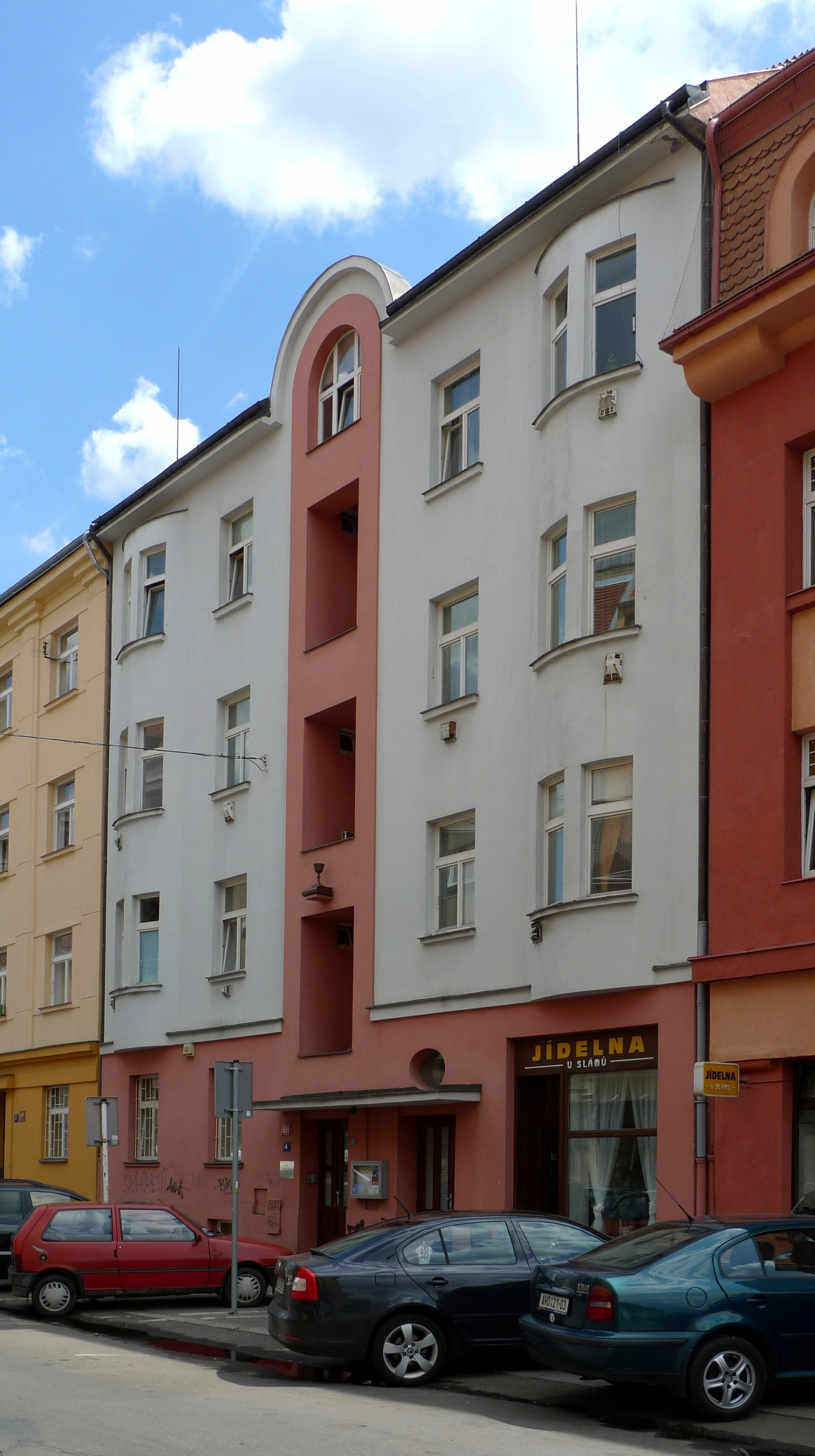
- The Church
- Parish Congregation of the Evangelical Church
- 50°4′31.98″N 14°29′25.45″E
- Location: King James Street.
- Country: Czech Republic
- Denomination: Evangelical Church of Czech Brethren
- Website: cce-strasnice.cz

History
- Status: Active
- Dedicated: 1930

Administration
- Diocese: Prague 10

Clergy
- Priest: Paul Klineckým

The Parish Congregation of the Evangelical Church is in Prague. Its denomination is the Evangelical Church of Czech Brethren Christian denomination.

== History and architecture ==
The church is not the shape of a traditional church but it has a schematic spire on its front in red bricks.

The organ dates from 1938 and has been used by many notable Czech musicians.

The church had a wooden font installed in 2002 designed by Ivan Jilemnický.
