= Prima SK =

Slovak television channel

- Country: Czech Republic
- Broadcast area: Slovakia
- Headquarters: Prague

Programming
- Language: Czech

Ownership
- Owner: FTV Prima
- Sister channels: TV Prima; Prima Cool SK; Prima Krimi SK; Prima Love SK; Prima Max; Prima Show; Prima Sport; Prima Star; Prima Zoom; CNN Prima News

History
- Launched: 23 January 2017 (Prima Plus); 27 May 2024 (Prima SK)
- Former names: Prima Plus (2017-2024)

Prima SK is a channel of the FTV Prima group, whose broadcasts are directed to the territory of Slovakia. Prima SK began broadcasting in Slovakia as Prima Plus on 23 January 2017. The program is mainly composed of Prima Television's own creations. The commercial representative of Prima SK is JOJ Group. According to the broadcast schedule, the Prima SK program consists mainly of programs created by Prima Television, whether they are serials, news programs, entertainment shows, culinary or hobby programs.

In 2017, Prima Plus was available from operators Skylink, Digi SK, UPC SK, and others, making it available to approximately 1.4 million Slovak households with pay TV services.

On 27 May 2024, Prima Plus changes its name to Prima SK.
