= State Opera (Prague) =

Opera house in Czechia

The State Opera
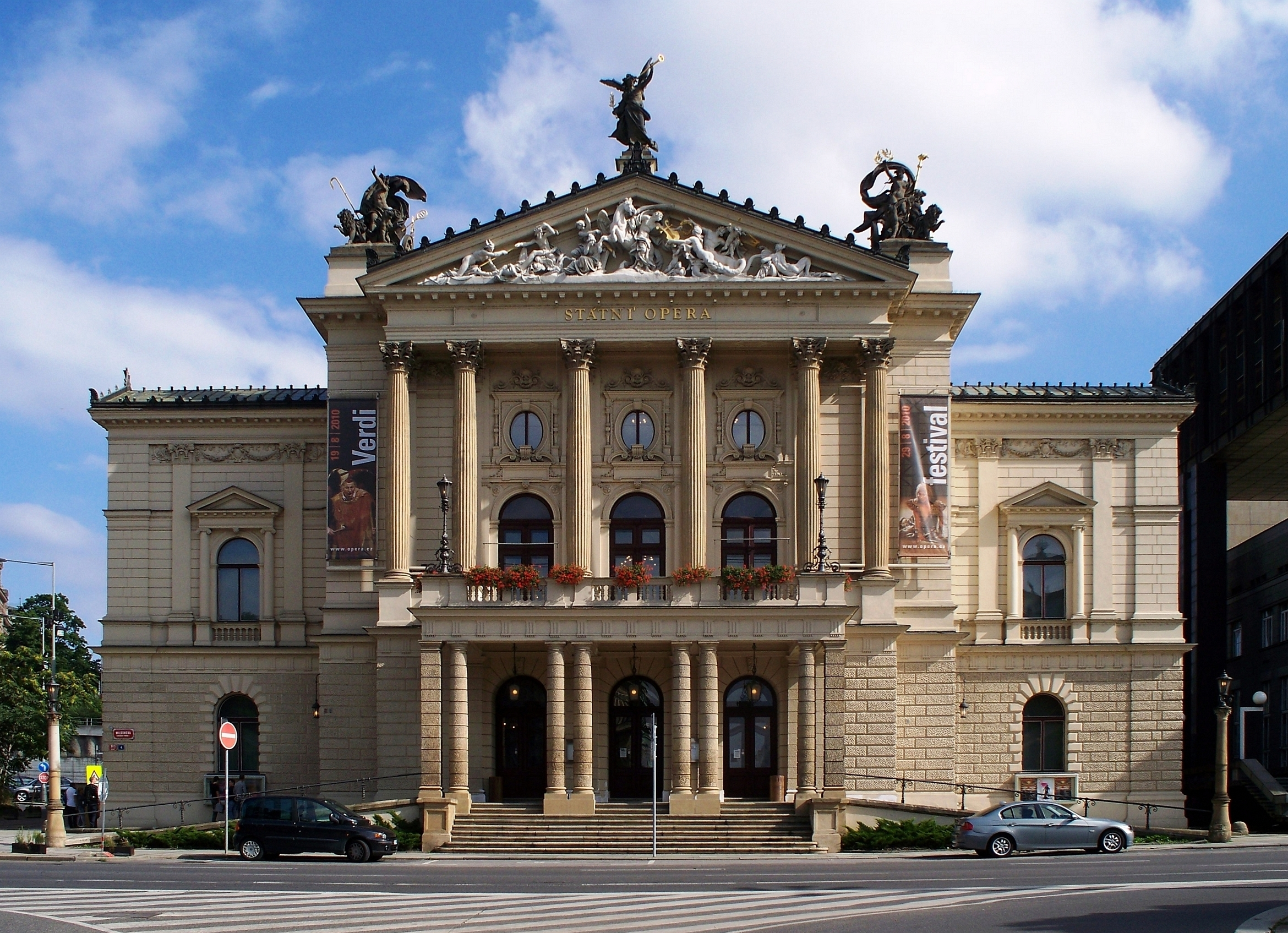
- Interactive map of The State Opera
- Address: Wilsonova 4, 110 00 Praha 1, Prague
- Location: Prague, Czech Republic
- Coordinates: 50°04′50″N 14°25′58″E
- Owner: Ministry of Culture
- Capacity: 1041

Construction
- Opened: 5 January 1888
- Rebuilt: 1960
- Architects: Fellner & Helmer

Website
- https://www.narodni-divadlo.cz/en/stages/the-state-opera

The State Opera (Czech: Státní opera) is an opera house in Prague, Czech Republic. It is part of the National Theatre of the Czech Republic, founded by Ministry of Culture of the Czech Republic in 1992. The theatre itself originally opened in 1888 as the New German Theatre and from 1949 to 1989 it was known as the Smetana Theatre. More recently it was renamed the Prague State Opera. Currently it is home to approximately 300 performances a year.

== History ==
=== New German Theatre ===
The New German Theatre between 1888 and 1893

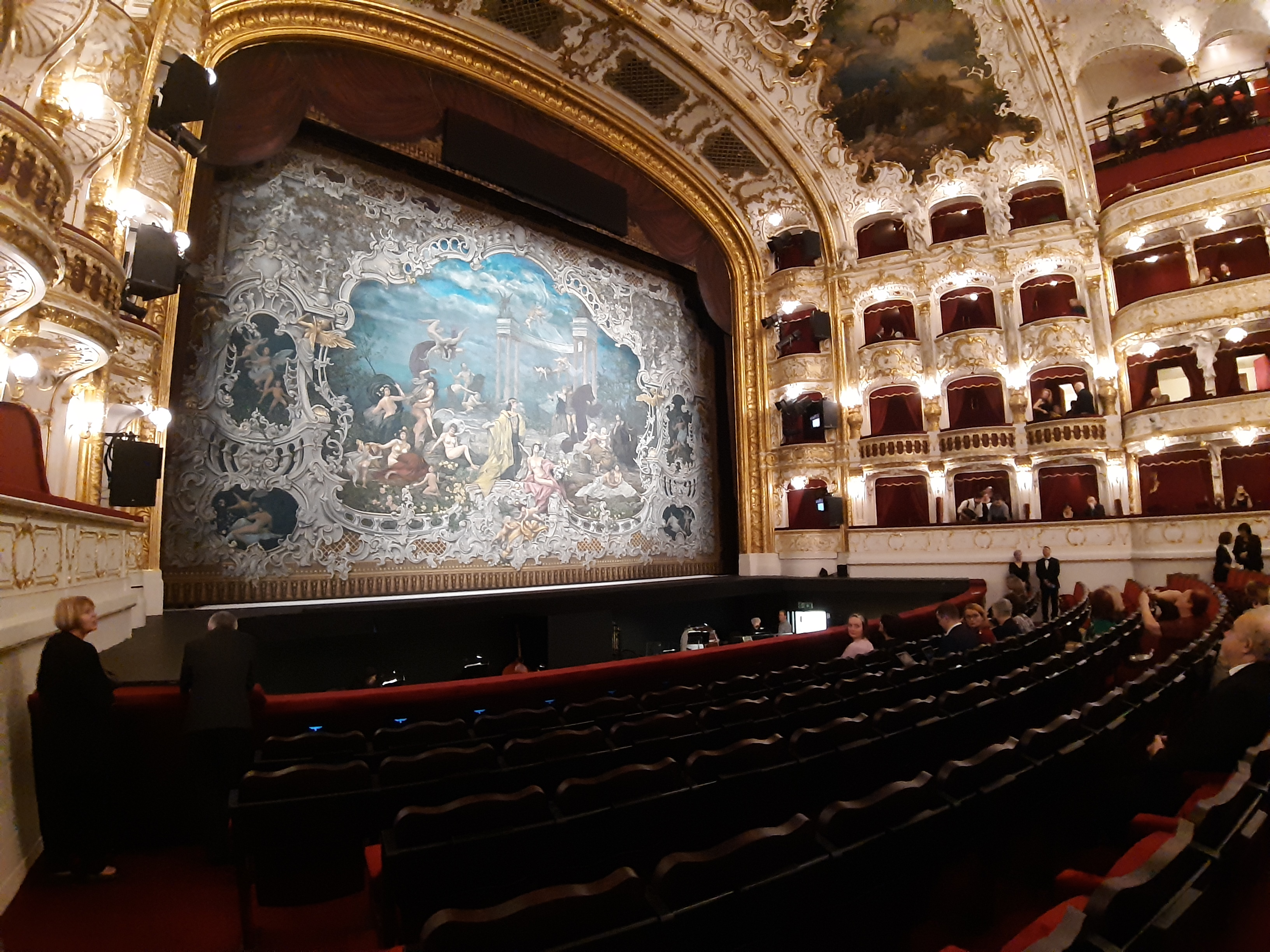
The auditorium.

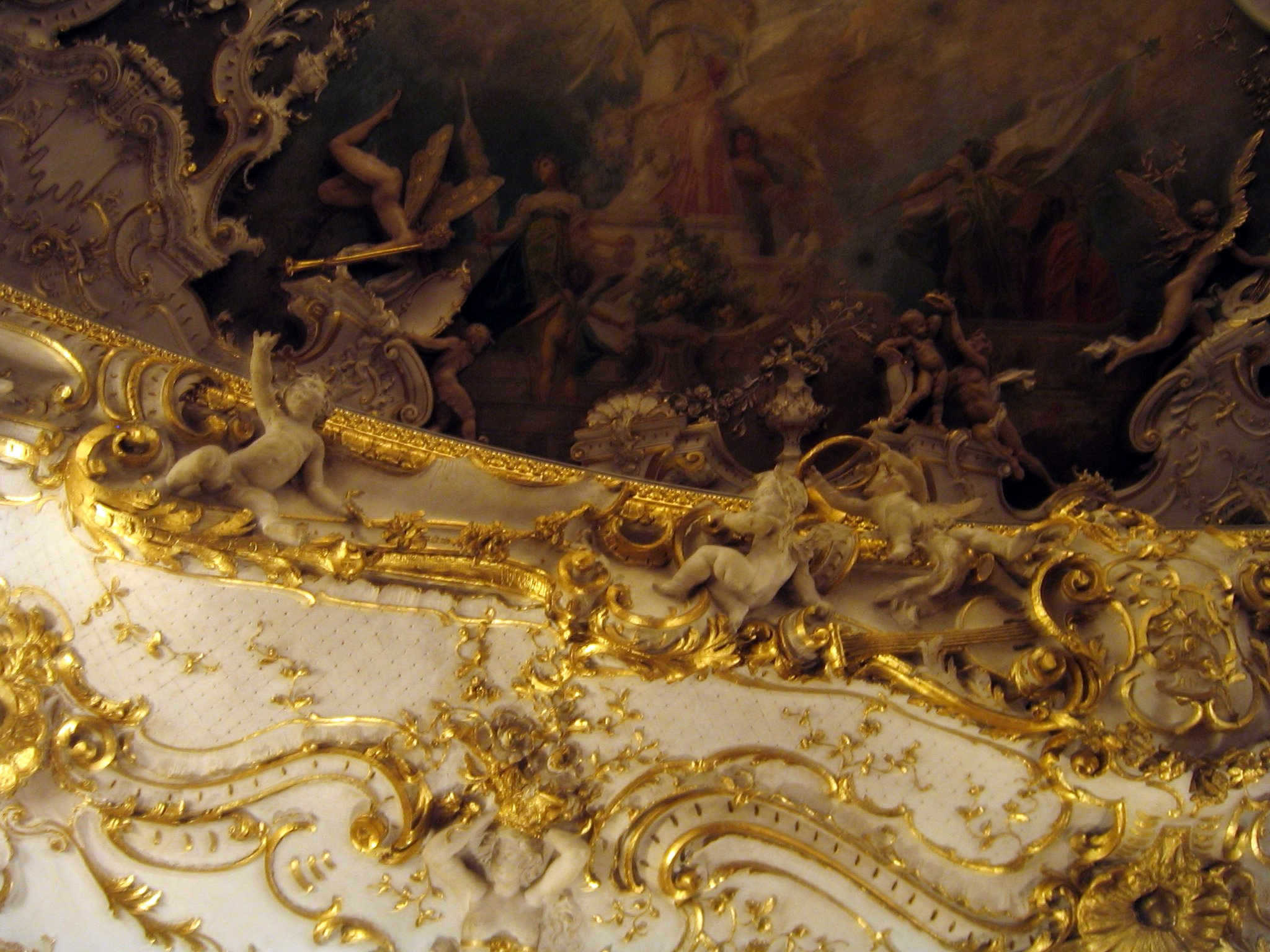
Ceiling detail.

The history of the theatre currently known as the Prague State Opera dates back to the late 19th century. While often overshadowed by the more prominent National Theatre of Prague, the company has its own distinct history. The birth of a magnificent Czech Theatre, the National Theatre, in 1883 indirectly created a longing among the Prague German community for a German-speaking opera house of its own. At that time the Czech lands were part of the Austro-Hungarian empire and there was a large German minority living in Prague. On 4 February 1883 the Deutscher Theaterverein was founded with the goal of raising funds for the new theatre. The plans were developed by the well-known Viennese firm Fellner & Helmer along with Karl Hasenauer, architect of the Burgtheater in Vienna. The resulting Neues deutsches Theater (New German Theatre) was designed by the Prague architect Alfons Wertmüller and built within 20 months. With its spacious auditorium and elaborate neo-rococo décor, the theatre was one of the most beautiful in Europe.

Performances commenced on 5 January 1888 with Richard Wagner's opera Die Meistersinger von Nürnberg. The first director was Angelo Neumann, who brought there distinguished musicians and set high artistic standards so that the theatre soon reached international recognition. Neumann's successors were Heinrich Teweles, Leopold Kramer, Robert Volkner, Paul Eger, and Pavel Ludikar. Artists associated with the theatre in its first phase included Kurt Adler (Conductor), Alexander Zemlinsky, Georg Széll, Erich Kleiber, Otto Klemperer, Alfred Piccaver, Hans Hotter, Kurt Baum, and Wilhelm Elsner. Guest artists included Nellie Melba, Enrico Caruso, Emma Calvé, Lilli Lehmann, Selma Kurz, Maria Jeritza, Richard Tauber and Leo Slezak.

=== Nazi era ===
In the 1930s, with the growing Nazi threat, the New German Theatre in Prague was among the bastions of democracy, serving as a refuge for artists fleeing from Germany. Political developments shortly before signing of the Munich Agreement along with financial problems however led the German Theatre Association to close the theatre in September 1938.

The Czechoslovak state expressed an interest in the building but the Nazi occupation of Czechoslovakia on 15 March 1939 and establishment of the "Protectorate of Bohemia and Moravia" thwarted its plans. Under the new title Deutsches Opernhaus (German Opera House), the theatre served for political assemblies of the Nazi Party, and for the occasional guest presentations by ensembles from the Reich.

=== Theatre of the Fifth of May ===
A radical change came in May 1945 following the fall of the Nazi-led government. A group of Czech artists headed by Alois Hába, Václav Kašlík, and Antonín Kurš founded the Theatre of the Fifth of May in the former German Opera House. For the first time the theatre became a home for Czech, rather than German opera. The first performance was of Bedřich Smetana's Brandenburgers in Bohemia on 4 September 1945. The artistic agenda of the new ensemble strove to create an avant-garde theatre that would serve as an alternative to the more conservative National Theatre. A striking new theatrical production of Jacques Offenbach's The Tales of Hoffmann on 29 August 1946 and a non-traditional staging of the previously untouchable Bedřich Smetana's The Bartered Bride, were followed by Alois Hába's quarter-tone opera Mother, Sergei Prokofiev's Betrothal in a Monastery, and others. The theatre's ground-breaking productions aroused attention on the part of the public and media including acclaim from abroad. Unfortunately, the success of the Grand Opera of the Fifth of May began to create unwanted competition for the National Theatre. Starting with the 1948–49 season, by government decree the Grand Opera was incorporated into the National Theatre. Thus the second significant creative period of the theatre ended after only three seasons.

=== Smetana Theatre ===
In November 1949, the building was renamed the Smetana Theatre, now functioning as a second house of the National Theatre under the Czech Communist Party government. Given the stage facilities, it was suitable for large-scale works from the worldwide operatic repertoire. Ballet was given a prominent place. Opera productions mounted at the Smetana Theatre could moreover enlist the services of all soloists, conductors and directors. However, the organizational division of the productions often gave rise to immense operational difficulties.

The repertoire provided for productions of Czech contemporary operas, but the works of Bedřich Smetana, Antonín Dvořák and Leoš Janáček were not neglected. However, the standard repertoire was formed out of the major and minor works from the world's operatic literature and quite a few productions met with international acclaim.

Due to its large stage facilities, the Smetana Theatre was frequently used by international opera, ballet and drama companies invited to Prague for guest performances. Among these were a series of six performance by the Bolshoi Theatre (May 23–28, 1973) and two performances by the Vienna State Opera of Richard Strauss´s Ariadne auf Naxos, conducted by Karl Böhm with Edita Gruberova as Zerbinetta (25 and 27 April 1979).

=== Prague State Opera ===
After the Velvet Revolution in November 1989, efforts to regain independence for the Smetana Theatre were crowned with success and on 1 April the Prague State Opera was established there and the theatre was renamed once again. Karel Drgáč became its first director. He enlarged the repertoire by further key works of the world opera literature. What earned him an unambiguous critical praise, though, was most notably his systematic cultivation of the legacy of 20th century production (Alexander Zemlinsky, Hans Krása, Gottfried von Einem). The new style of work, and the much-stressed orientation toward the traditions of the New German Theatre were not always well received. Thus Drgáč had to fight a series of battles to win the war for the State Opera's existence. And meanwhile he lost his own battle, when upon expiration of his three-year term the mezzo-soprano Eva Randová emerged victorious from the competition held in 1995 for the post of director. However, not even a singer who had experience in the most prestigious Theatres of the world could avoid later criticism of her manner of managing the Theatre. Her successor, Daniel Dvořák, in many ways continued in the trend of Karel Drgáč. He understood the Prague State Opera as a Theatre that needed to be incorporated into the European context, and opera as a genre whose development needed to be helped through support of new works. During his four seasons (1998–2002) Prague had the opportunity to experience an unprecedented number of world premieres.

After Dvořák left his post to take over as the Director of the National Theatre of Prague, the Czech Minister of Culture appointed Jaroslav Vocelka to head the Prague State Opera. Previously its managing director, Vocelka's long experience in opera administration allowed a smooth transition for the company. The Prague State Opera maintains a policy of progressive programming. New productions of Scott Joplin´s Treemonisha; Ruggero Leoncavallo's La bohème; Eugen d'Albert's Tiefland; and Leonard Bernstein's Candide have all been key works in the house's program-building policy. Vocelka has also continued a tradition of staging benefit concerts for many charitable and humanitarian concerns and has made the theatre available for cultural and social events.

In 2003, the opera's ballet corps merged with the noted Prague Chamber Ballet company to create the Prague State Opera Ballet.

== Archives ==
An important part of the Prague State Opera's operation is its Documentation Centre. Apart from keeping systematic archival records of the theatre's activities, it has focused on the reconstruction of the lost archives of the New German Theatre. In 2004, the Prague State Opera published, with the Slovart publishing company, a book on its history, The Prague State Opera: A History of the Theatre in Pictures and Dates. The book, with texts in Czech, English and German, documents the history of the opera house from the New German Theatre to the present. Drawing material from a wide array of sources, both domestic and international, the publication grouped together an invaluable literary and photographic archive, including a number of documents which were published for the first time.

== See also ==
- List of opera houses
