= Záběhlice =

- Cadastral district of Prague
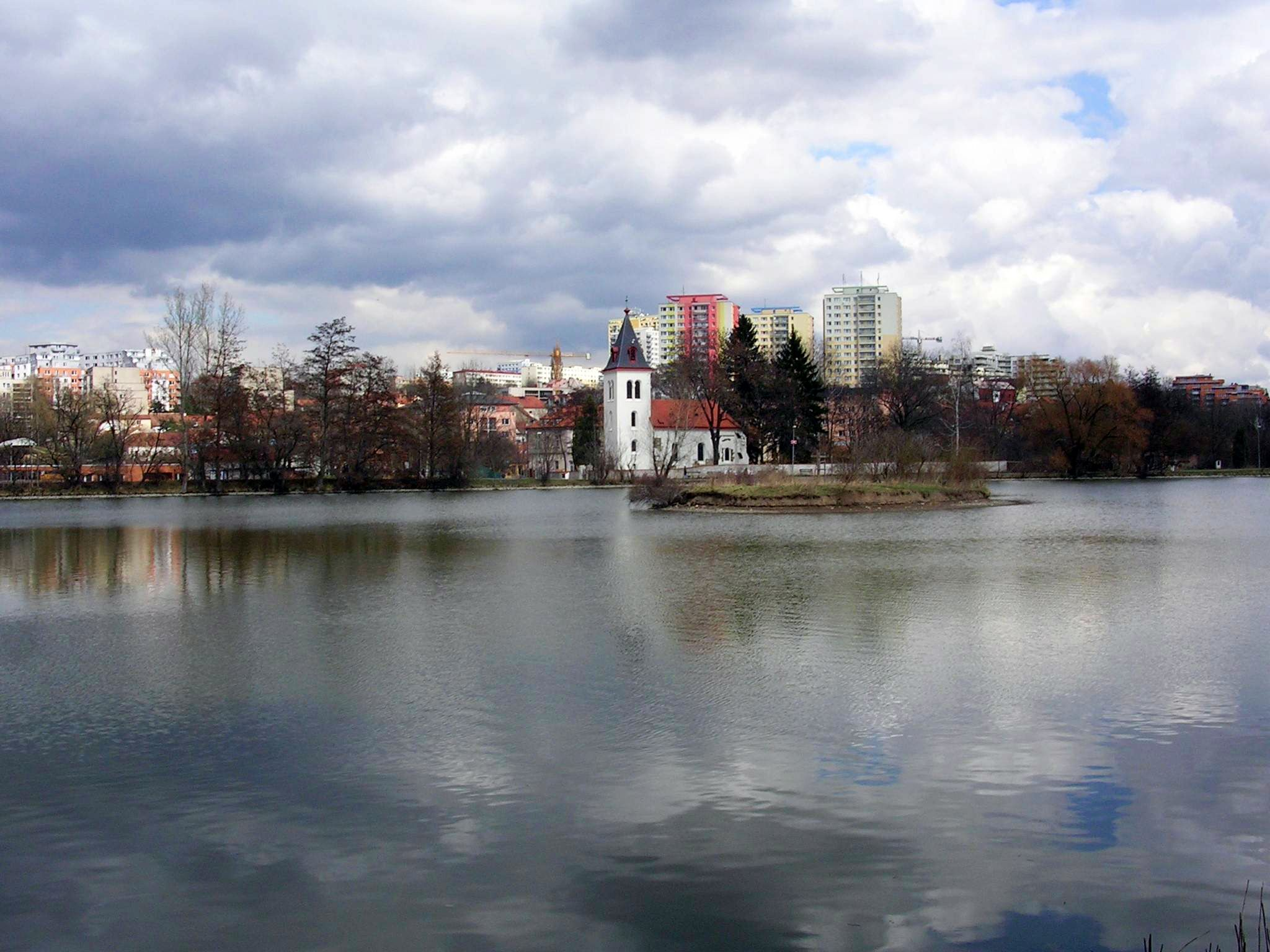
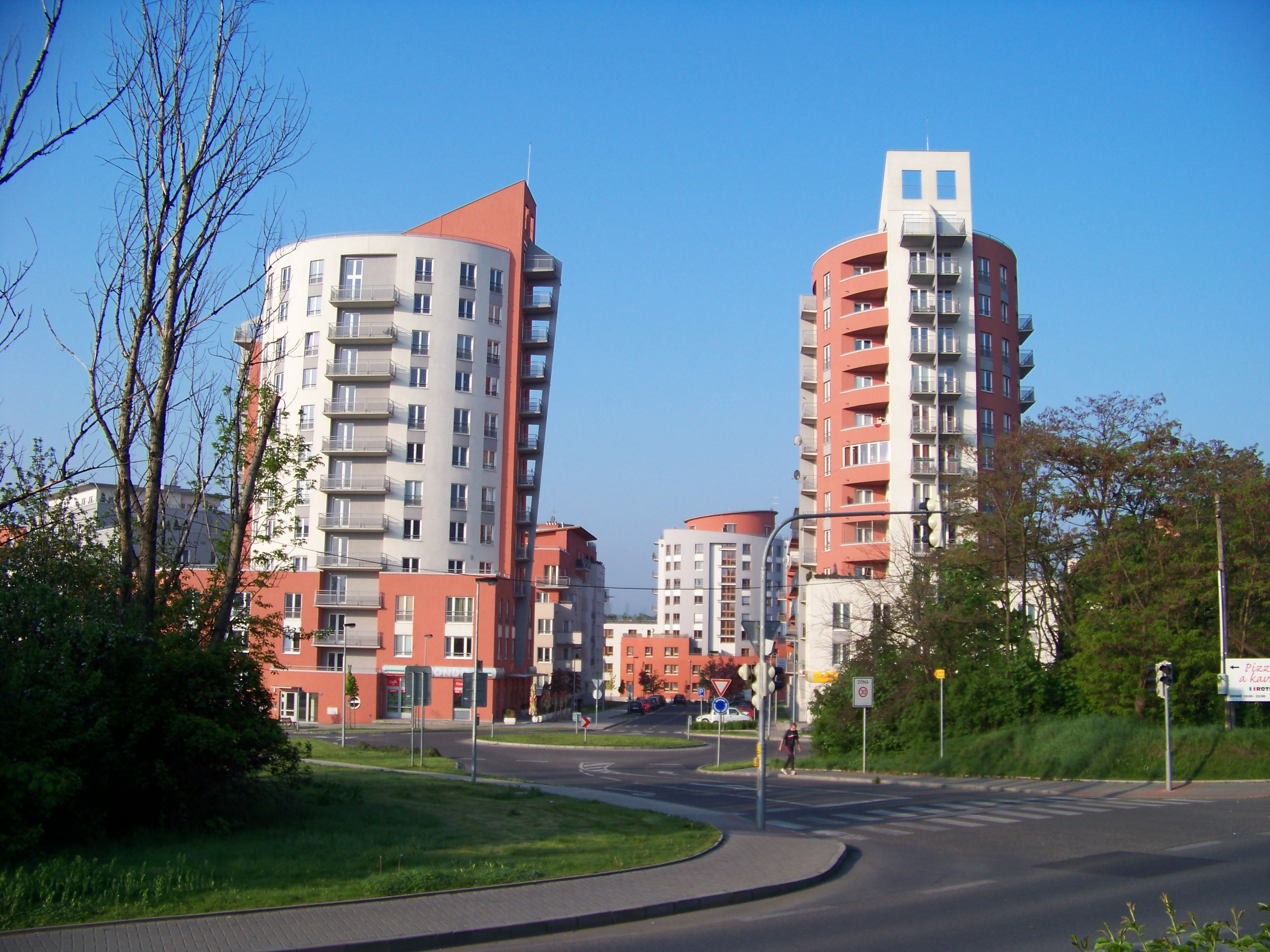
- Hamerský pond Field in Záběhlice Old and new houses in Záběhlice Záběhlice housing estate Nové Zahradní Město Bus at Zahradní Město train station

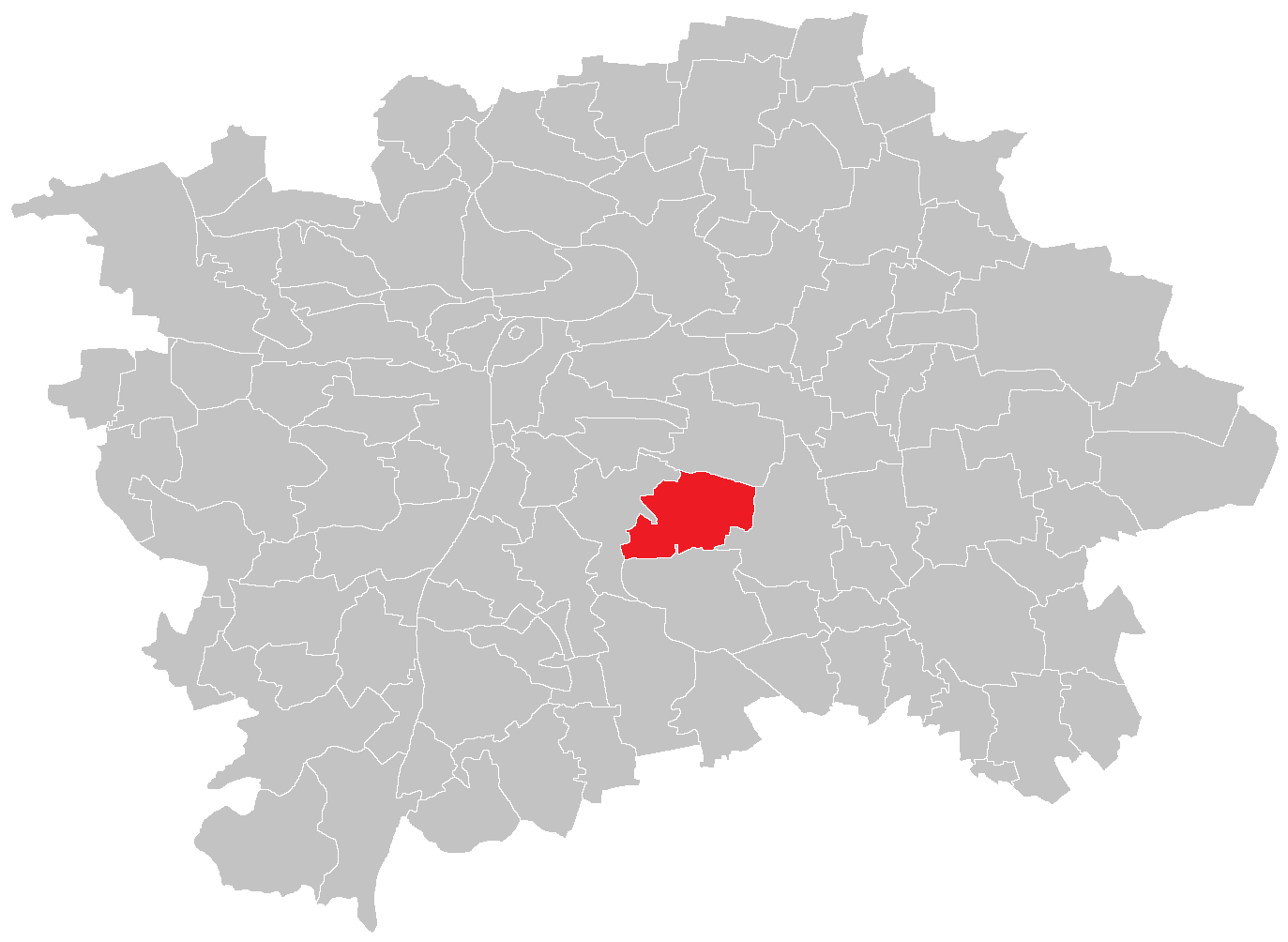
- Location of Záběhlice in Prague
- Coordinates: 50°3′25″N 14°29′58″E
- Country: Czech Republic
- City: Prague
- District: Prague 10 and Prague 4
- Incorporated (into Prague): 1922

Area
  - Total: 5.68 km^{2} (2.19 sq mi)

Population (2021)
  - Total: 35,228
  - Density: 6,200/km^{2} (16,100/sq mi)
- Time zone: UTC+1 (CET)
  - Summer (DST): UTC+2 (CEST)
- PSČ: 102 00, 106 00, 141 00

Záběhlice is a cadastral area of Prague, Czech Republic, lying in both the Prague 10 and Prague 4 administrative districts.

== History ==
The first mention of Záběhlice dates to the 1088 foundation charter of the Vyšehrad Canonry. Though the surviving document itself is a forged copy from the 12th century, the mention is considered authentic. By the fifteenth century, the growth of wineries in the township led to the wine of Záběhlice being ranked amongst the best Czech wines of the day. The Záběhlice Church, built around the 12th century, is an important structure remaining from the early days of the township. Excavations in February 1960 uncovered the ruins of a medieval fort at the bottom of Hamerský Lake, probably built by Holy Roman Emperor Václav IV (Wenceslaus) who visited the area in 1408 and destroyed in the Hussite Wars of 1420. The first school was opened in 1863. By 1907, it comprised five grades; however, two were operated privately. It became a part of the city of Prague in 1922, and formed a division of the Prague XIII district. In the 1960s, the extensive Zahradní Město housing estate was built in Záběhlice.

== Záběhlice Castle ==
Záběhlice Castle (Czech: Záběhlický zámek) was built in the 17th century atop a 14th-century fort. In 1886 a fire destroyed most of the castle and it had to be rebuilt, but by the 20th century it was again in disrepair. In 1907, Václav Černý purchased the castle and magnificently renovated it along with its grounds. During World War I it was host to several high-ranking officials of the Austro-Hungarian Army.

== Demographics ==
There are 3,255 households in Záběhlice comprising 32,034 persons, of whom 17,111 are female, 14,923 are male and 3,134 are under fifteen years of age (1,531 being girls and 1,603 boys). It lies in three post codes: 102 00, 106 00 and 141 00.

Historical population

Year	Pop.	±%
1869	1,301	—
1880	1,420	+9.1%
1890	1,704	+20.0%
1900	2,047	+20.1%
1910	2,669	+30.4%

Year	Pop.	±%
1921	2,736	+2.5%
1930	6,494	+137.4%
1950	13,853	+113.3%
1961	14,629	+5.6%
1970	40,285	+175.4%

Year	Pop.	±%
1980	39,478	−2.0%
1991	36,882	−6.6%
2001	33,111	−10.2%
2011	35,702	+7.8%
2021	35,228	−1.3%

Source: Censuses
