= Strašnice =

- Cadastral district of Prague
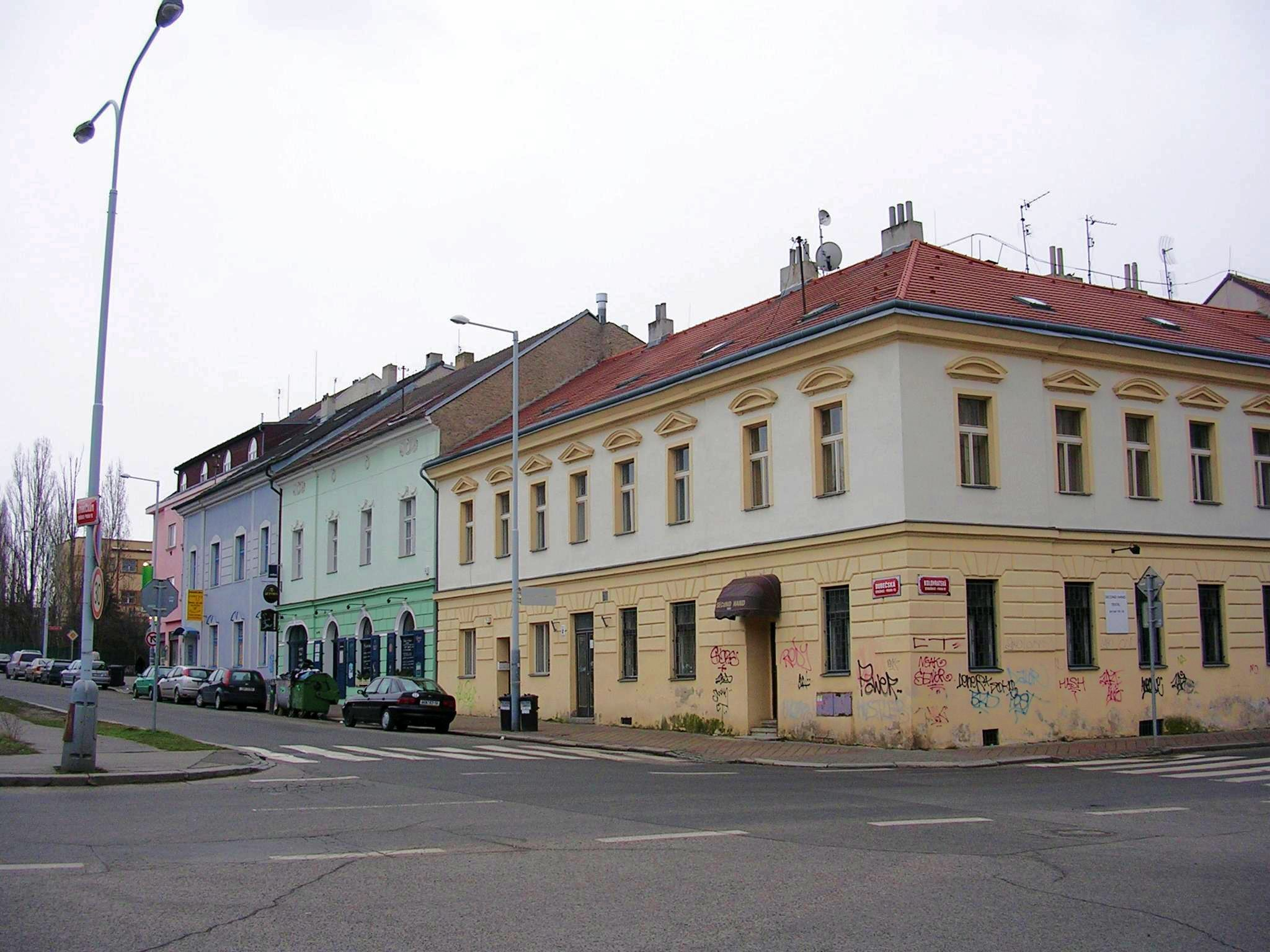
- Blockhouses

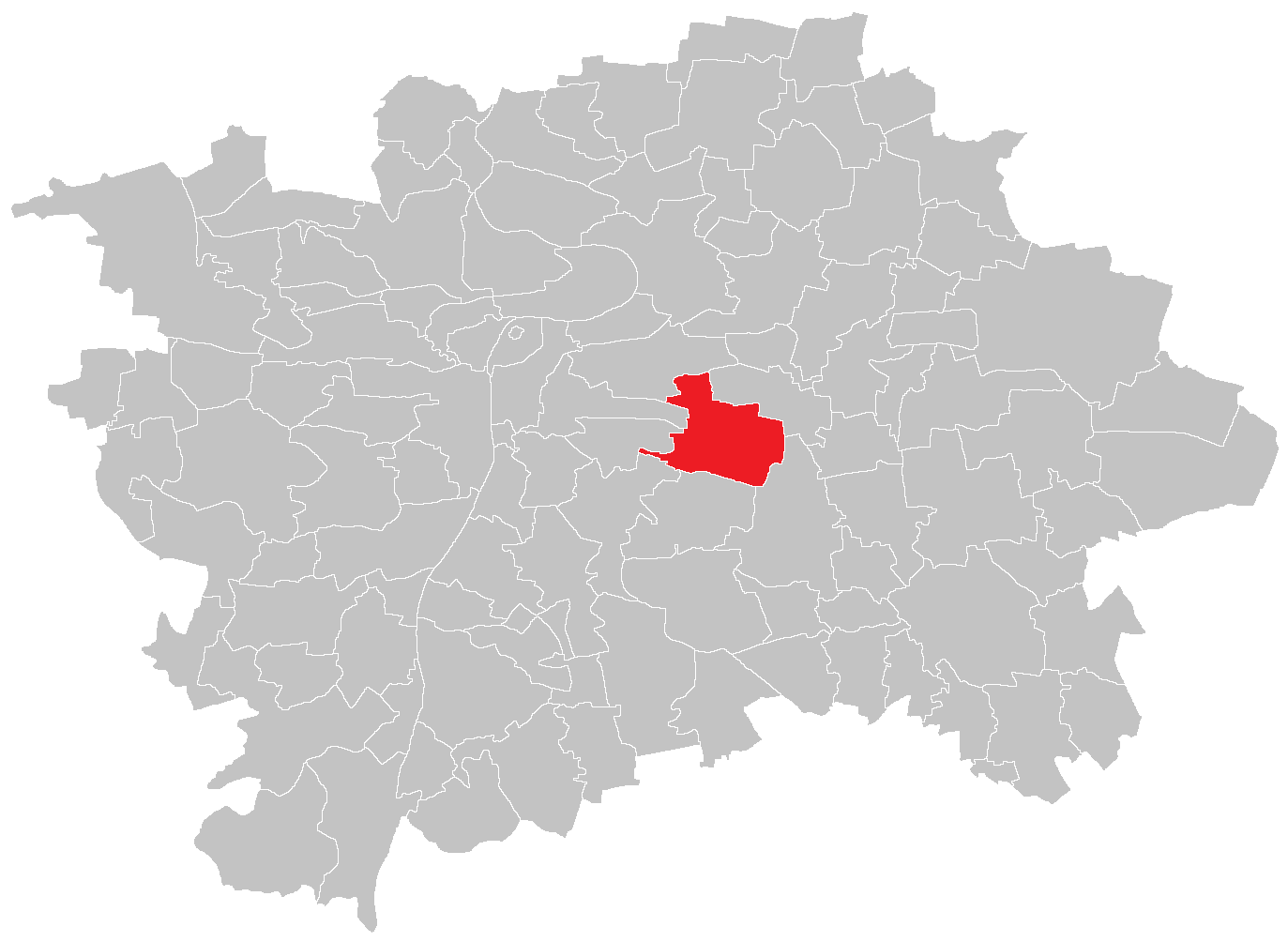
- Location of Strašnice in Prague
- Coordinates: 50°04′20″N 14°30′00″E
- Country: Czech Republic
- City: Prague
- District: Prague 3, Prague 10
- Incorporated into Prague: 1922

Area
  - Total: 6.18 km^{2} (2.39 sq mi)

Population (2021)
  - Total: 37,665
  - Density: 6,090/km^{2} (15,800/sq mi)
- Time zone: UTC+1 (CET)
  - Summer (DST): UTC+2 (CEST)
- Postal code: 100 00, 101 00, 108 00, 130 00

Strašnice is a cadastral district in Prague. It became part of Prague on 1 January 1922. It lies mostly in the municipal and administrative district of Prague 10 while a small part is in Prague 3. The district is bordered by Vršovice, Vinohrady, Žižkov, Malešice, Hostivař, Záběhlice and Michle.

Only four streets in Strašnice are in Prague 3, while 180 streets of the district are in Prague 10. The area contains an Evangelical cemetery and the Parish Congregation of the Evangelical Church.

Strašnice Crematorium is actually situated at the edge of Vinohrady, close to Strašnice.

== Parish of Strašnice ==
The parish of Strašnice was created in 1929 although it was a parish without a church. The congregation initially met at a private house until a small chapel could be built. The desire to build a proper church was held up initially by lack of funds, then by the Second World War and finally by the communist regime. The idea was reinvigorated by the Prague Spring and a foundation stone was laid by the Pope in 1990. The Roman Catholic Church of the Immaculate Conception was constructed by 1994 and the previous chapel became a community space.

== Transport ==
=== Public transport ===
The area is serviced by three stations on the city's metro line A, namely Strašnická, Skalka and the terminus, Depo Hostivař. Trams in Prague also service the area, specifically lines 4, 5, 7, 13 and 26. The district is home to the Strašnice tram depot, which began operation in 1908 and is the oldest operational tram depot in the city. Bus services also call at stops in Strašnice, with the Depo Hostivař metro station being the terminal for out-of-city services.

=== Rail ===
A railway line connecting Prague with Benešov passes through the area and until 2020, the Praha-Strašnice railway station was served by local trains on the line. The station was closed in 2020 as part of a modernization of the line, and replaced by Praha-Eden railway station (in Vršovice) and Praha-Záhradní Město railway station (in Záběhlice).

== Demographics ==
Historical population

Year	Pop.	±%
1869	559	—
1880	590	+5.5%
1890	654	+10.8%
1900	1,075	+64.4%
1910	4,062	+277.9%

Year	Pop.	±%
1921	4,773	+17.5%
1930	13,827	+189.7%
1950	31,068	+124.7%
1961	43,579	+40.3%
1970	46,290	+6.2%

Year	Pop.	±%
1980	47,176	+1.9%
1991	40,036	−15.1%
2001	36,496	−8.8%
2011	37,503	+2.8%
2021	37,665	+0.4%

Source: Censuses
