= Michle =

- Cadastral Area of Prague
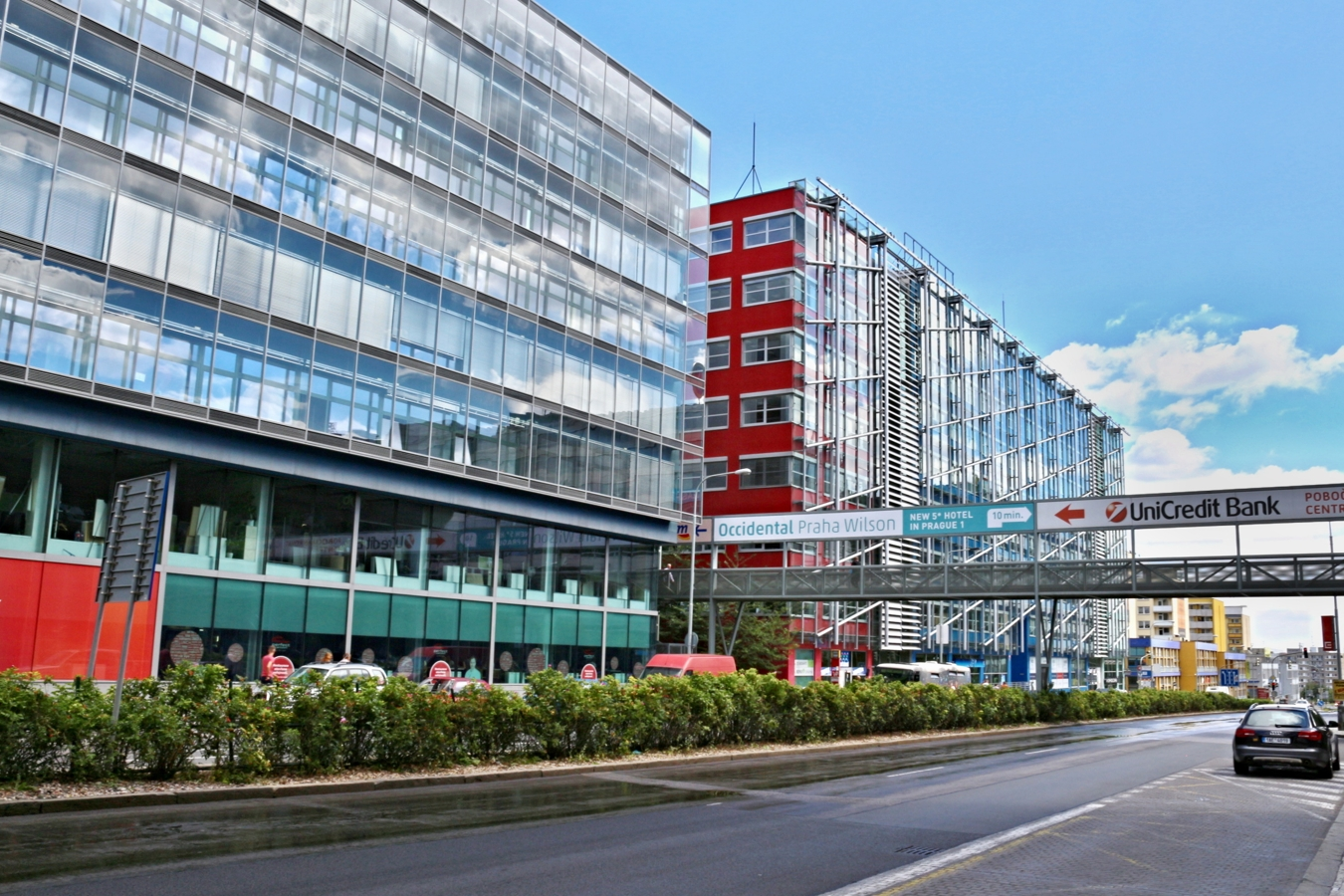
- BB Center, Vyskočilova street

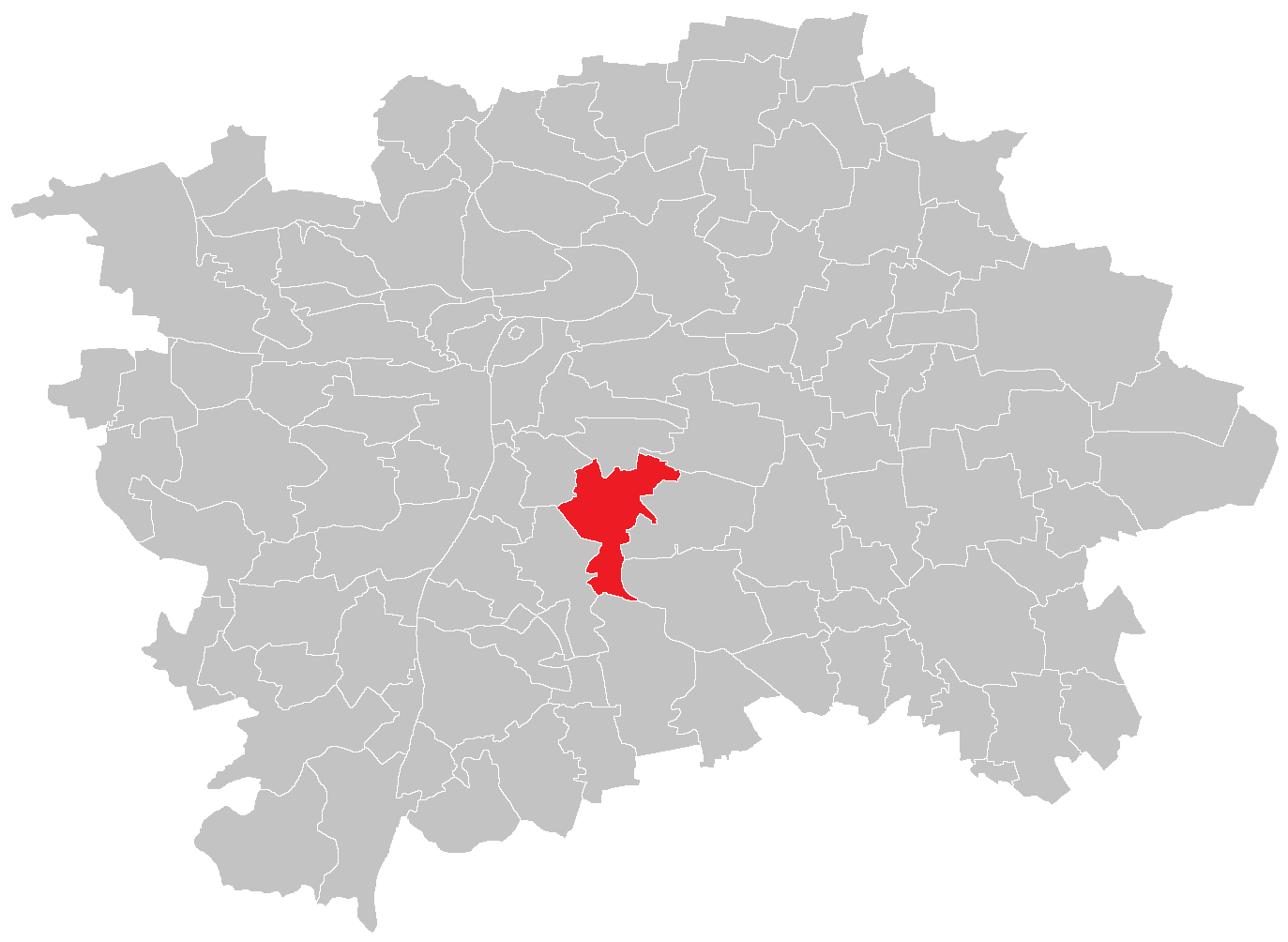
- Location of Michle in Prague
- Coordinates: 50°02′55″N 14°27′35″E
- Country: Czech Republic
- Region: Prague
- District: Prague 4, Prague 10

Area
  - Total: 5.51 km^{2} (2.13 sq mi)

Population (2021)
  - Total: 21,402
  - Density: 3,880/km^{2} (10,100/sq mi)
- Time zone: UTC+1 (CET)
  - Summer (DST): UTC+2 (CEST)

Michle is a district of Prague city, part of Prague 4.

Michle is first mentioned in 1185; it has been part of Prague since 1922.

== Demographics ==
Historical population

Year	Pop.	±%
1869	1,756	—
1880	2,530	+44.1%
1890	4,138	+63.6%
1900	6,144	+48.5%
1910	8,287	+34.9%
1921	9,172	+10.7%
1930	23,112	+152.0%
1950	22,461	−2.8%

Year	Pop.	±%
1961	23,268	+3.6%
1970	23,995	+3.1%
1980	22,634	−5.7%
1991	21,815	−3.6%
2001	19,870	−8.9%
2011	20,555	+3.4%
2021	21,402	+4.1%

Source: Censuses
