= Prague 10 =

Prague 10 Praha 10
- Municipal District of Prague; Administrative District of Prague
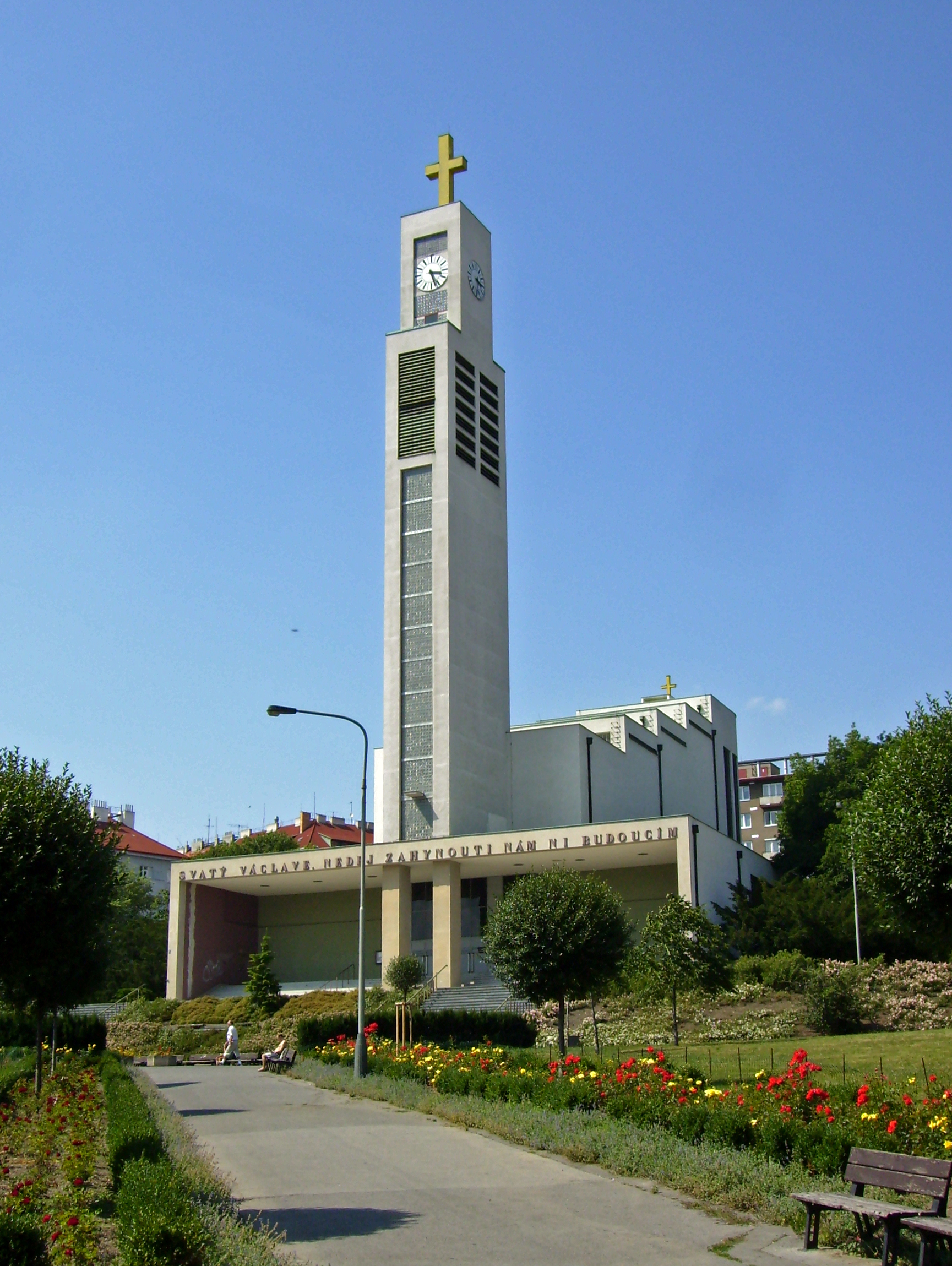
- Saint Wenceslaus Church in Vršovice

- Flag Coat of arms

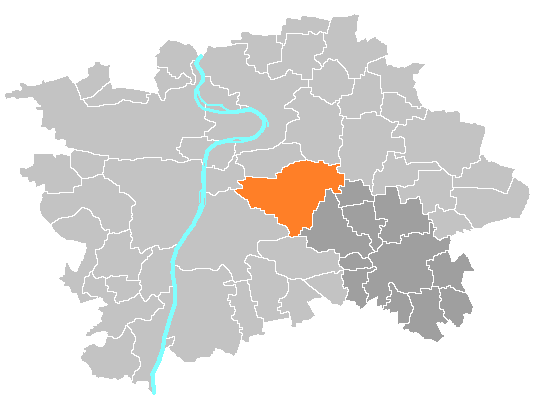
- Location of Prague 10 in Prague
- Country: Czech Republic
- Region: Prague
- Founded: 1990

Government
  - Mayor: Martin Valovič (ODS)

Area
  - Total: 18.60 km^{2} (7.18 sq mi)

Population (2021)
  - Total: 114,377
  - Density: 6,149/km^{2} (15,930/sq mi)
- Time zone: UTC+1 (CET)
  - Summer (DST): UTC+2 (CEST)
- Postal code: 100 00
- Website: http://www.praha10.cz

Prague 10 is both a municipal and administrative district in Prague, Czech Republic with more than 110,000 inhabitants.

== Neighbourhood (cadastral communities) of Prague 10 ==
- Vršovice
- large part of Strašnice (except the block with Tesla Strašnice and part of Nákladové nádraží Žižkov, which fall within the city district Prague 3)
- small part of Vinohrady (south and east from the streets Slovenská, U vodárny, Korunní, Šrobárova, U vinohradského hřbitova a Vinohradská)
- large part of Malešice
- part of Záběhlice
- part of Michle (Bohdalec and the greater part of the Slatiny settlement)
- small part of Žižkov
- other small parts

== Important Buildings ==
- Hus' House (Vinohrady)
- Trmalova Villa
- Strašnice Crematory
- Vršovice Castle
- Vlasta Neighborhood
- Vršovice Savings Bank Building

== Demographics ==
Historical population
Year	Pop.	±%
1869	5,743	—
1880	8,051	+40.2%
1890	11,283	+40.1%
1900	17,348	+53.8%
1910	32,211	+85.7%
1921	41,656	+29.3%
1930	61,648	+48.0%
1950	95,667	+55.2%
1961	125,219	+30.9%
1970	147,128	+17.5%
1980	138,231	−6.0%
1991	120,755	−12.6%
2001	108,609	−10.1%
2011	113,200	+4.2%
2021	114,377	+1.0%
Source: Censuses

== Twin towns ==
- Ballerup, Denmark
- Prešov, Slovakia
- Nyíregyháza, Hungary
- Jasło, Poland

== See also ==
- Districts of Prague § Symbols
