= ČT3 =

Czech television channel

- Country: Czech Republic

Programming
- Language: Czech

Ownership
- Owner: Czech Television
- Sister channels: ČT1; ČT2; ČT24; ČT Sport; ČT :D; ČT art

History
- Launched: 14 May 1990; 36 years ago
- Closed: 1 January 2023; 3 years ago
- Former names: OK3 (1990-1992); ČTV (1992–1993)

ČT3 (Česká televise 3, colloquially Trojka) was a Czech public television channel, operated by Czech Television. ČT3 originally broadcast in 1990 when it replaced the previous station OK3. Unlike the other two channels of the Czech Television at the time, ČT1 and ČT2, ČT3 broadcast its program largely in foreign languages and 24 hours a day.

ČT3 was reinstated during the COVID-19 pandemic, with the intention to provide content tailored towards elderly viewers to help them cope with isolation. It aired programs from the archive of Czechoslovak and Czech television. While originally planned as a temporary channel, it was later decided to keep the channel permanently. In 2022, however, Czech Television decided to stop broadcasting ČT3 on 1 January 2023, citing the need to limit financial expenses. The ČT3 station broadcast from 5:59 until approximately two in the morning and was available in terrestrial, satellite and cable broadcasts.

== History ==
=== 1993 ===
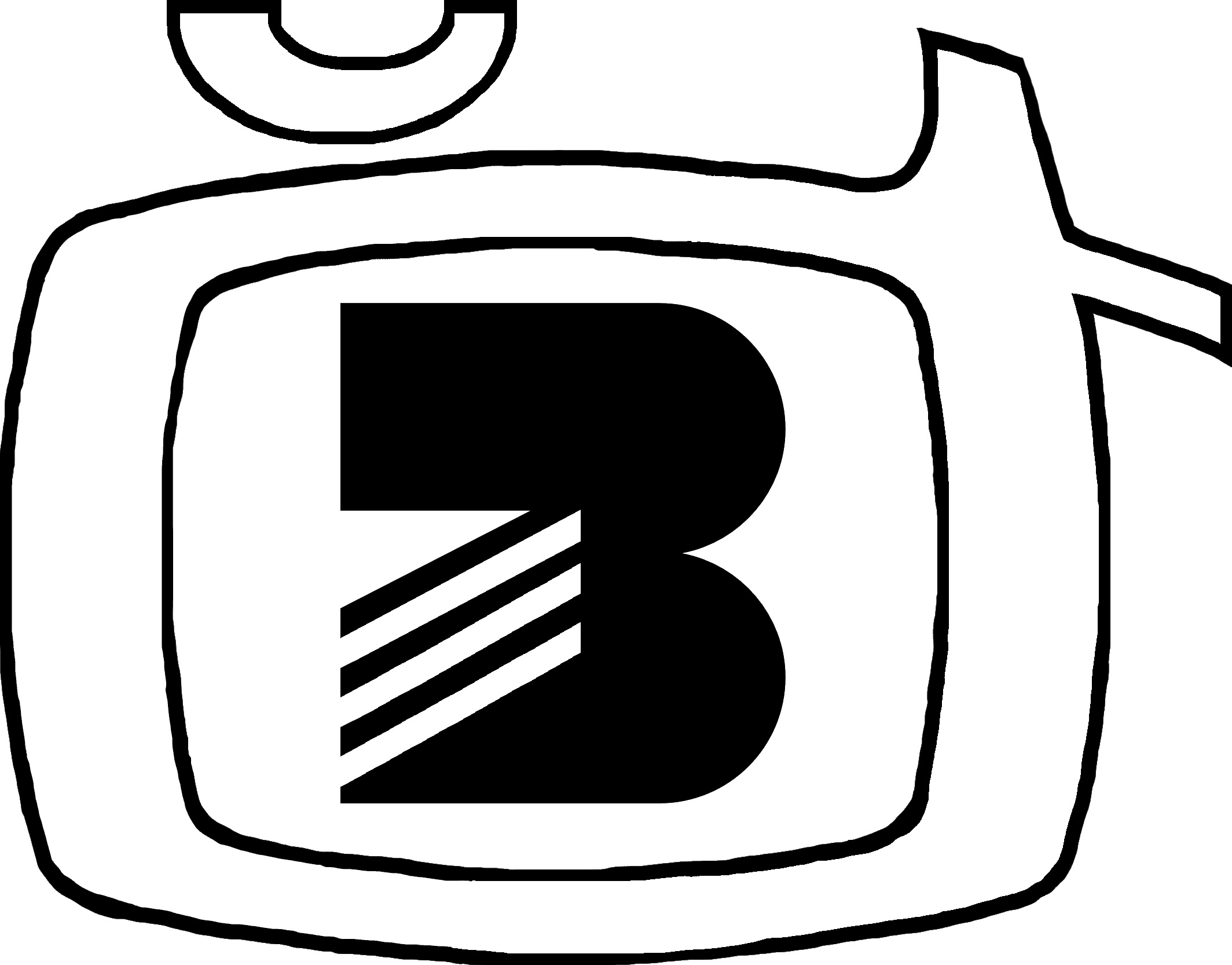
1993 logo

The history of the ČT3 station stems from the third broadcast circuit of the Czechoslovak Television, which was originally used to broadcast Soviet television in Czechoslovakia. In the early 90s this circuit was divided into two new stations as part of federalization. On 14 May 1990, station OK3 began broadcasting for the Czech Republic, and on 6 June 1991, station TA3 for Slovakia. From 1 January 1992, the station OK3 was operated by the newly established Czech Television. After the Dissolution of Czechoslovakia, the OK3 channel was renamed ČT3 on 1 January 1993. Broadcasting of ČT3 was terminated on 31 December 1993.

From 1 January 1994, Czech Television broadcast the program offer of the ČT2 channel on the ČT3 frequency network. Simultaneous broadcasting of ČT2 ended on 3 February 1994, when this channel left the original frequencies and remained only on the frequencies of the former ČT3 channel. From 4 February 1994, the first Czech full-scale commercial station, TV Nova, began to use the vacated space.

=== 2010 ===
After 2010, Czech Television began planning a new children's channel, which was officially known as ČT3. It finally started broadcasting on 31 August 2013 under the name ČT: D.

=== 2012–2023 ===
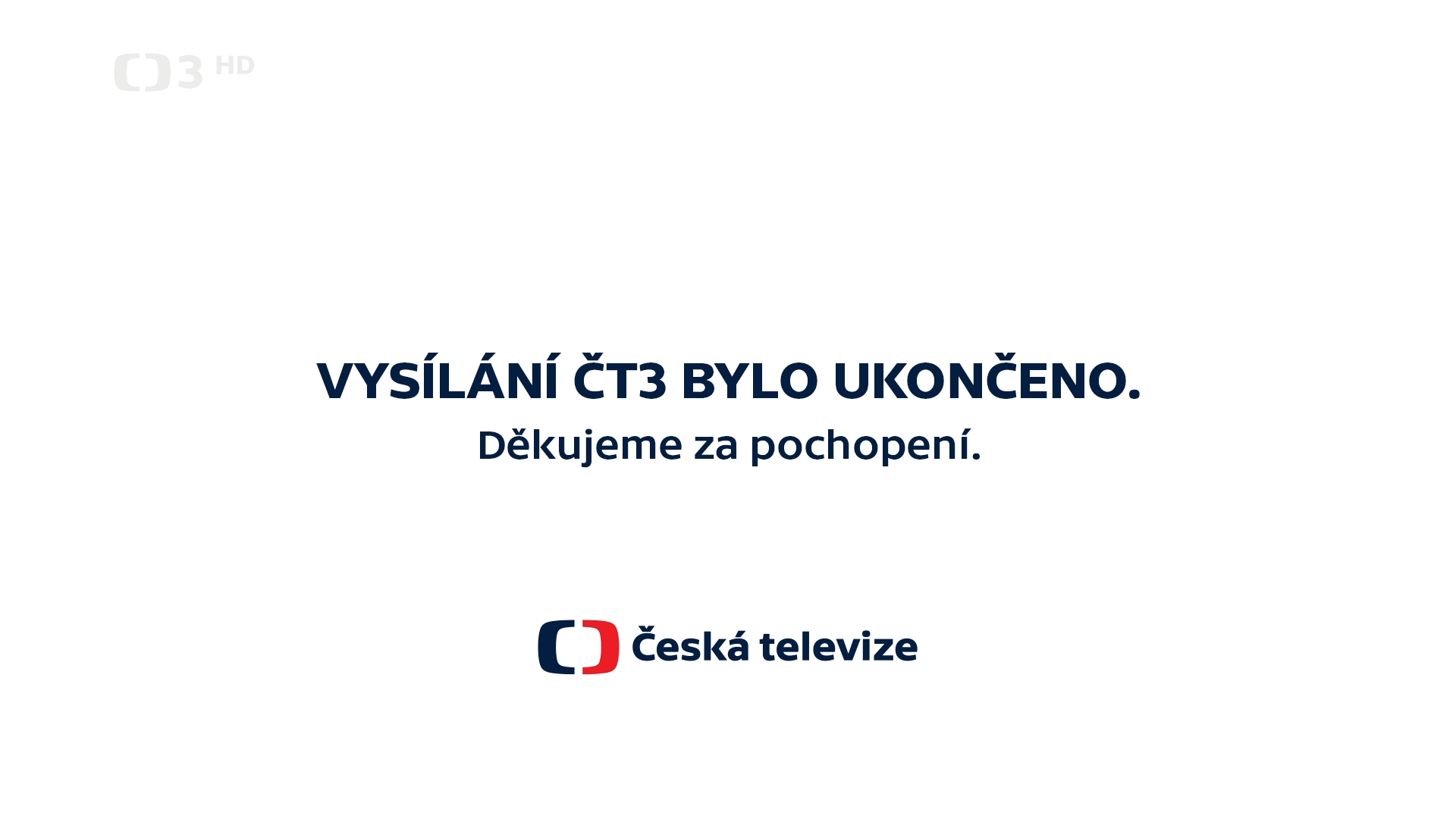
End of broadcast announced.

Establishment of the temporary TV channel According to Czech Television (ČT), senior citizens, who were a vulnerable group during the COVID-19 pandemic, spent the most time at home during the crisis and public television wanted to provide them with a television program adapted to their needs. Due to the extraordinary situation, ČT stopped producing most of its regular programs and was able to use the funds for the creation of a new channel. Broadcasting.

On 24 March 2021, the Council of Czech Television approved the transition from test broadcasting to regular broadcasting and agreed to its financing until the end of 2021. In November 2021, CEO Petr Dvořák stated that Czech Television is counting on the ČT3 station in the following years as well, however in November 2022, Czech Television announced that its operation would end at the end of 2022 due to the need for financial savings. ČT3 broadcasting ended on 1 January 2023, in the first minutes of the new year, after the New Year's toast.

=== Possible return ===
Program Director of Czech Television Milan Fridrich stated on 19 July 2023 that ČT3 might be restored in future if financial situation of Czech Television might get better. Elected Director-general Jan Souček who is to assume office in October 2023 confirmed that he supports restoration of ČT3. On 4 September 2023 Souček announced he plans restoration of ČT3 with possible date set for 2024/2025. Channel will most likely change format from a retro channel.

On 25 April 2025 Director-General of Czech Television Jan Souček announced that ČT3 would most likely return in September 2025. In May 2025 Souček was removed from the office adn was subsequently succeeded by Hynek Chudárek. Chudárek started that he doesn't plan to restore ČT3 during the first half of his tenure due to need of archive programs for the ČT1 channel before the strengthening of drama production. He noted that production of original series had to be limited due to lack of funds in the past. He noted that ČT3 won't be restored at least during first two or three years of his tenure.

== See also ==
- Television in the Czech Republic
- Telecommunications in the Czech Republic
