= Television Studio Brno =

Coordinates: 49.1986°N 16.6695°E

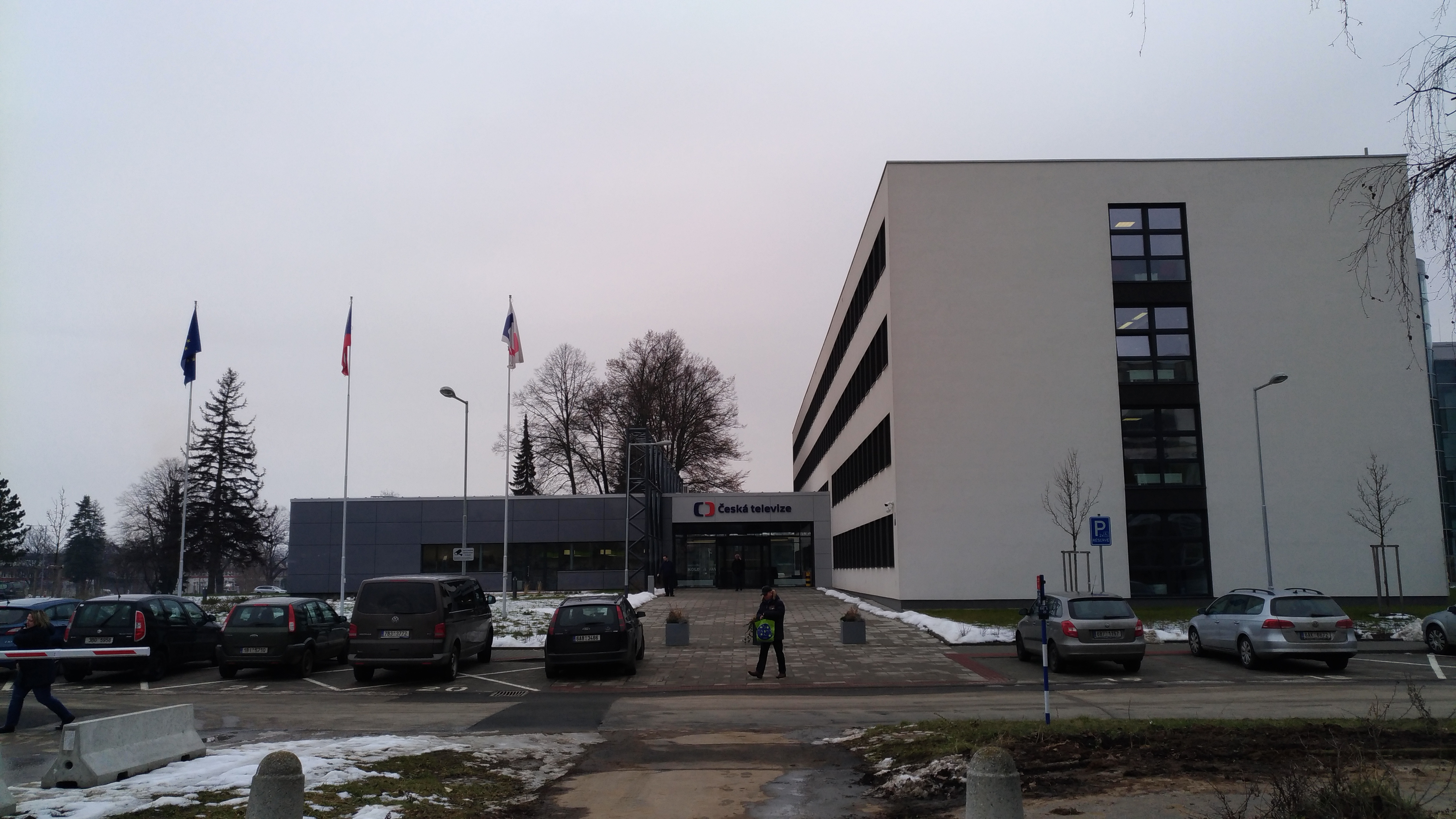
Residence in Líšeň

Television studio Brno is a legally established regional studio of Czech Television in Brno. It was established in June 1961 as the third non-Prague studio of the then Czechoslovak Television (after Ostrava and Bratislava), and began broadcasting on July 6 of the same year with the live composed program Sedmikrásky nad Brnem. The studio was located in two buildings in the city center, since 2016 it has been broadcasting from a building in the outskirts of Brno-Líšeň. At the end of 2020, it had 237 employees. The Zlín newsroom and its staff also fall under the responsibility of the newsroom of Television Studio Brno.

The studio does not have legal personality. However, its director is authorized by law to perform legal acts related to the studio, including the conclusion of contracts, on behalf of Czech Television, with the exception of dealing with real estate. The director is elected and recalled by the Council of Czech Television on the proposal of the director general of the entire institution. Since November 2023, Petr Albrecht is the director of Television Studio Brno.

== Development and production of programs ==
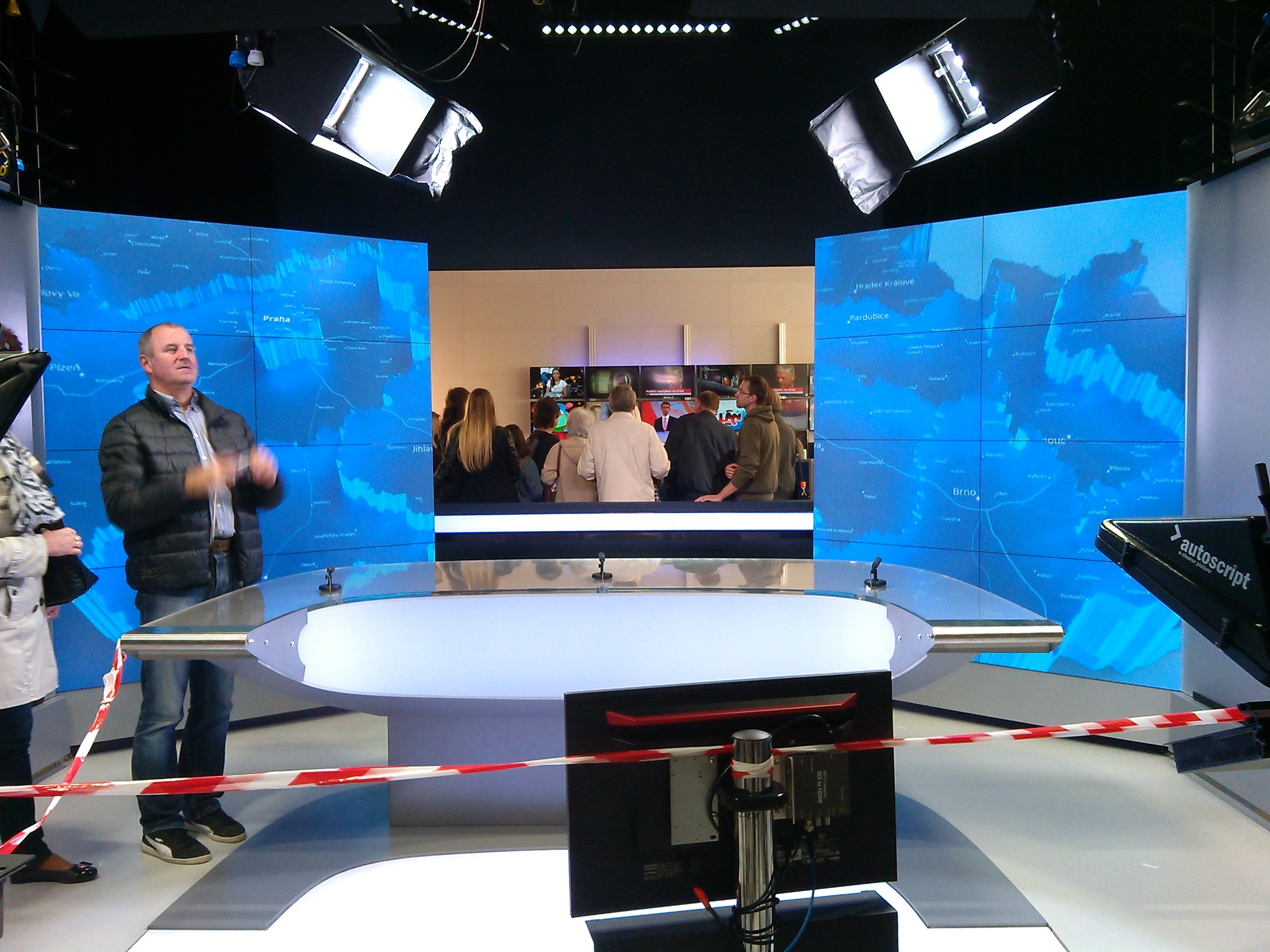
News studio

Three out of the total number of 16 creative production groups (TPS) work at the Television Studio Brno, which are involved in the development of new programs and program formats for Czech Television broadcasting. By 2021, the TPS of drama, entertainment and children's works is working in Brno; TPS of religious creation and TPS of document and new formats. The activities of the Brno production groups are coordinated by the Dramaturgy Center TS Brno, which also deals with the dramaturgy of regular "running" programs.

In 2020, Television Studio Brno and its individual creative groups dealt with 130 subjects, of which 46 were accepted at the development stage by the end of the year and 26 had already been produced. In a given year, the studio prepared a total of 693 premiere programs with a total length of 577.4 hours for the program circuits ČT1, ČT2, ČT Déčko and ČT art.

== Residence ==
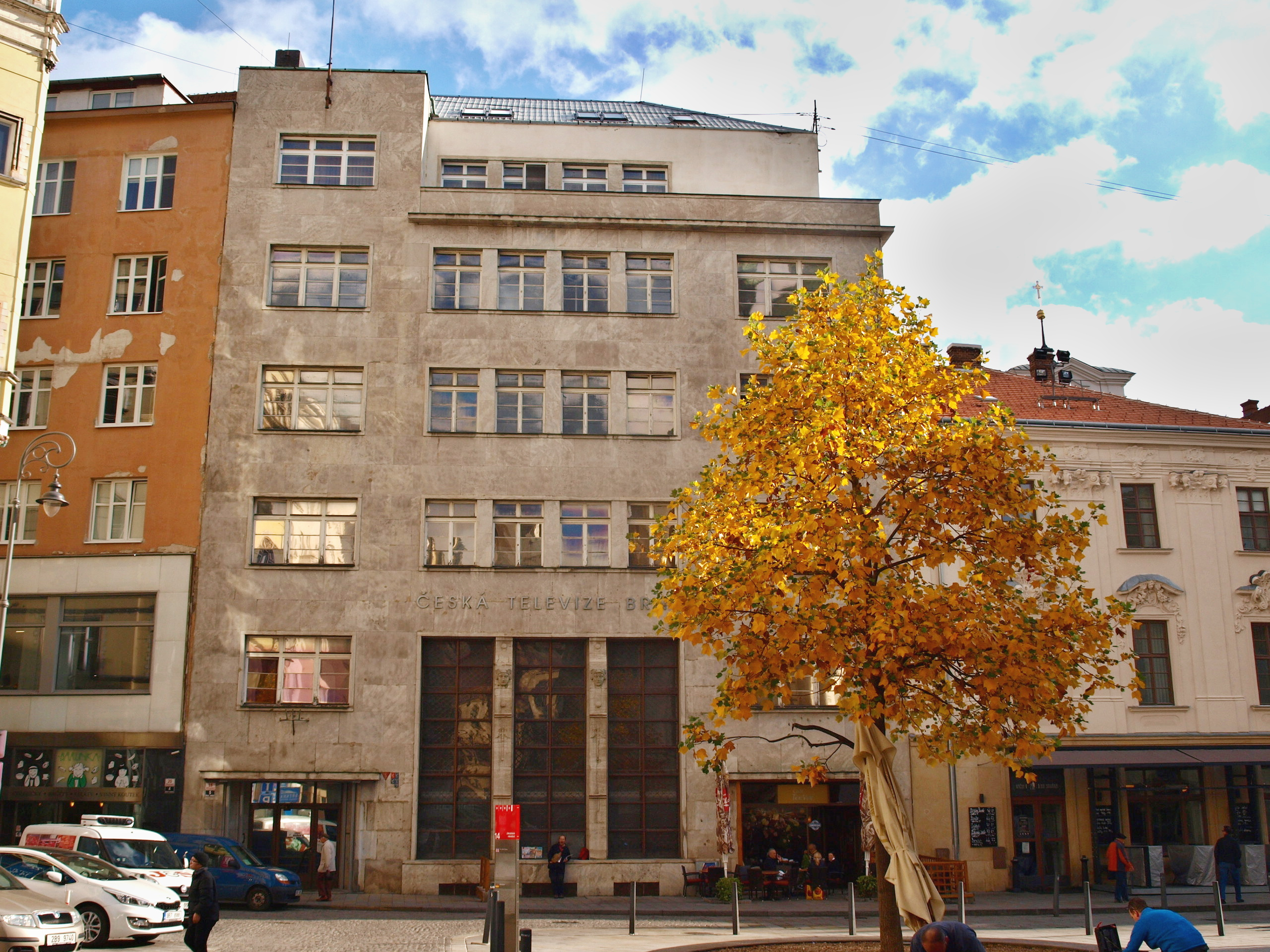

Until October 3, 2016, the Brno studio ČT was located in the city center in two nearby but buildings: in the original Typos apartment building with an arcade on the ground floor and a former wine bar and dance hall in the basement in Jezuitská Street (studios) and in a former bank building in Běhounská Street (directorate). Since October 2016, it has been broadcasting from a new premises in Líšeň.

Czech Television invested a total of 350 million crowns in the new headquarters of the Brno studio, of which 274 million in construction, 32 million in lighting technology and 45 million in television technology. There are three studios in the building, one of which is used exclusively for news and current affairs programs. The largest has an area of 330 square meters. Construction took 16 months.
