= Události =

- Country of origin: Czech Republic
- Original language: Czech

Production
- Running time: Monday–Friday: 55 minutes Saturday and Sunday: 51 minutes

Original release
- Network: ČT1 (1993–); ČT24 (2005–); ČT3 (2022–2024)
- Release: January 1, 1993

Události (English: Events) is the daily evening news programme for Czech Television. It also contains Branky, body, vteřiny (Goals, Points, Seconds) and Počasí (Weather). Since its inception, it has been broadcast on ČT1 and since 2005 also on ČT24. In the years 2020–2022, it was also broadcast on ČT3. The program focuses on the most important events from the day of the broadcast (but also the day before after the broadcast of previous Události) that took place in the Czech Republic and around the world. On 1 April 2012, several changes took place, including starting to broadcast from a new modified virtual Studio 8, having previously broadcast from Studio 9 with the news control room in the background.

== History ==
Události was broadcast for the first time on 1 January 1993 at 19:30 with moderator Jiří Janeček. It replaced Deník ČST (Daily ČST) and Zpravodajství ČTV (ČTV News).
