= Jan Tyl =

Czech developer and analyst

- Born: 26 May 1979 (age 47)
- Education: Charles University
- Occupations: Analyst, programmer
- Awards: AI Awards (2019)

Jan Tyl (born 26 May 1979) is a Czech developer and analyst. His main concern is popularization and development of artificial intelligence. He is the founder and CEO of the company Alpha Industries.

== Education and career ==
Tyl graduated from the Hussite Theological Faculty of Charles University focusing on the field of ethics, philosophy and religion. He started his career as an analyst and consultant in various banking houses, where he mainly concerned himself with e-banking security and digital signatures.

He studied artificial Intelligence on MIT, Google Brain, Yonsei, Moscow and lectured about it at various schools and conferences. In 2018, he founded Alpha Industries, a company dedicated to the development and research of artificial intelligence and projects such as Insult Detector, Emotion Detector, and Magic Diary. He completed his MBA in the field of Startups and Entrepreneurship in 2022.

== Alpha Industries ==
In 2018, Jan Tyl founded Alpha Industries, a start-up whose main objective is the research and development of artificial intelligence. Just a year later, in 2019, the company won the competition AI Awards for the best idea in the field of artificial intelligence. The award was for a project called Digital Philosopher.

Other Alpha Industries projects concerned with AI research include Emotion Analysis, where a trained deep neural network recognizes feelings in texts and creates an emotional picture of a person, analysis of vulgar text in the Insult Detector app, the Keyword Project, where a smart network recognizes a spoken "keyword" and, for example, triggers a device, and the Name Generator.

== Projects ==
=== Matylda ===
For Czech Television, Tyl created a digital persona called Matylda for the 2021 election superdebate, which asked politicians unusual questions. To create the questions, Matylda was given the programmes of parties, movements and coalitions concerning the future and digitalisation, as well as the biographies of the individual chairmen. The project was met with critical feedback on social media.

=== Digital philosopher ===
In the autumn of 2019, the Digital Philosopher project was created as part of the Contemporary Philosophy course taught at the Faculty of Arts of Charles University, in collaboration with Dita Malečková and students of the Faculty of Arts of Charles University. Digital Philosophers are programs based on deep neural networks that have thoroughly studied the works of famous philosophers and try to think like them. The aim was to interconnect artificial intelligence and philosophy in a university setting.

In addition to Václav Havel, other thinkers such as Hannah Arendt, Jean-Jacques Rousseau, and the economist Tomáš Sedláček were created as a part of the project. The generated personalities are available online for ordinary users to test out.

=== Digital writer ===
A digital writer is an artificial intelligence algorithm (a neural network combining GPT-3 and Deep Tree technologies) that creates its own literary texts by studying thousands of books and other publications by human authors.

It was created by Dita Malečková in cooperation with Jan Tyl and a team of IT specialists in 2020. The research group focused on the architecture of the algorithms used to generate the literary texts. Thus, they taught the neural network to build a consistent story. Engineers, experts in machine learning and audiovisual technologies, students of the Institute of New Media Studies at the Faculty of Arts of Charles University and writers all collaborated on the project.

The Digital Writer's works appeared on Czech Radio, where he wrote a series of five short stories - a science fiction, a love story, a detective story, a horror and a historical novel. His work also appeared in Salon of Law, where AI created two appendices on the subject of "home" in the style of salon short story cycles.

For Digital Writer, Jan Tyl was nominated for the Prix Europa in the Digital Media Project category.

=== DigiHavel ===
Jan Tyl has been working on the DigiHavel project since 2021. DigiHavel is a digital human inspired by the Czech president Václav Havel. It is the first digital human - an artificial intelligence - used in Czech schools, which pupils talk to during civics lessons using an interactive web application. The aim is to modernize Czech education, to teach children to think, ask questions and verify facts, and above all to educate them about freedom, democracy and human rights.

DigiHavel represents the personality of Václav Havel, spreads his ideas and opinions and enables students to develop digital competence. DigiHavel is a joint project of the Konrad-Adenauer-Stiftung, Alpha Industries and the Department of Civic Education of the Faculty of Education of Masaryk University, under the umbrella of the Odpovědné občanství project.

As of 2022, the project is in the phase of pilot testing in civic education classes in selected schools. From January 2023, other schools from the Czech Republic can also participate in the project. The DigiHavel school programme is suitable for high-schools, multi-year grammar schools and secondary schools. The main aim is that children will learn to think critically through interactive debate with DigiHavel and not just be passive observers in the classroom. In addition to that, it should make learning more fun and playful.

=== Molly ===
In 2022, he created a digital persona Molly, who was the face of the advertising campaign of the Lunchmeat festival of electronic music and visual art, which took place in Prague at the turn of September and October 2022. She was able to write, among other things, a short bio of a performer, social media posts, or even texts for the festival's spokesperson.

== Popularisation of artificial intelligence ==
As part of the popularization of artificial intelligence, Jan Tyl has given numerous lectures, podcasts and interviews with the aim of making the topic of artificial intelligence more accessible to the general public.

He appeared, for example, in the Futuro programme on ČT :D, in the Sama doma programme on Czech Television, where he described his workings on the Digital Philosopher project, or in an interview on DVTV, where he explained the advances in artificial intelligence in the field of generating photos from text (text-to-image) and the related problems with copyright and misuse of content. He discussed the topic of creativity, collaboration of artist with artificial intelligence and problems with authorship in the ArtZóna programme on ČT art.

In December 2022 appeared with Alena Reslova on Snídaně s Novou programme to introduce the DigiHavel project to the general public. He then presented the project himself on the Dobré ráno programme in episode Mýty, where he also demonstrated how the app would work.

For the Goethe-Institut, he created a digital Goethe to further demonstrate people the possibilities of artificial intelligence in the German language.
