= The Defender (2021 TV series) =

- Genre: Crime, Drama
- Written by: Tomáš Feřtek, Matěj Podzimek
- Directed by: Tereza Kopáčová, Tomáš Mašín
- Starring: Lukáš Vaculík
- Country of origin: Czech Republic
- Original language: Czech
- No. of seasons: 1
- No. of episodes: 10

Production
- Running time: 60 minutes

Original release
- Network: ČT1
- Release: September 5 – November 7, 2021

The Defender (Czech: Ochránce) is a Czech drama television series, that premiered on Czech Television in 2021. Series also appeared at Serial Killer festival. It won Czech Film Critics' Award in category "Outside Kino."

Series focuses on a teacher Aleš Pelán who becomes School Ombudsman to stand up for children, parents and teachers in need. Pelán's cases include teacher bullied by her students, investigation of a pupil's suicide, girl who has never attended school, parents of students harassed by their classmate or sexual abuse of students by their teacher. All episodes are inspired by real cases.

== Cast ==
- Lukáš Vaculík as Aleš Pelán
- Iveta Dušková as Jana Pelánová
- Jaroslav Plesl as Pavel Havlík
- Barbora Kodetová as Marta Beková
- Agáta Červinková as Barbora Černá
- Pavel Řezníček as Petr Starý
- Jiří Havelka as Marcel Suchý
- Petra Hřebíčková as Kristýna Kurzová
- Jan Vondráček as inspektor Jarošík
- Lucie Ducháčková as Sára Jermanová
- Vladimír Javorský as MUDr. Luboš Pivec
- Miroslav Vladyka as Václav Škvára

== Episodes ==
| No. | Title | Directed by | Original release date | Czech viewers (millions) |
|---|---|---|---|---|
| 1 | "Slabý kus" | Tereza Kopáčová | September 5, 2021 | 1,313 |
| 2 | "Vražda vychovatelky" | Tomáš Mašín | September 12, 2021 | 1,342 |
| 3 | "Andílek" | Tereza Kopáčová | September 19, 2021 | 1,362 |
| 4 | "Orchidej na smetišti" | Tereza Kopáčová | September 26, 2021 | 1,266 |
| 5 | "Džungle před tabulí" | Tomáš Mašín | October 3, 2021 | 1,261 |
| 6 | "Veřejný nepřítel" | Tomáš Mašín | October 10, 2021 | 1,295 |
| 7 | "Vrabčák" | Tereza Kopáčová | October 17, 2021 | 1,361 |
| 8 | "Ahoj tati" | Tereza Kopáčová | October 24, 2021 | 1,251 |
| 9 | "Hidžáb" | Tomáš Mašín | October 31, 2021 | 1,221 |
| 10 | "Tichá dohoda" | Tereza Kopáčová | November 7, 2021 | 1,355 |

== Spin-off ==
Director of the ČT1 program Milan Fridrich mentioned that spin-off is in production. On 19 March 2024 Czech Television announced series Ratolesti which was called thematical sequel to The Defender. It is set for broadcast in 2025.
