= Adikts =

2024 Czech television series

- Genre: Comedy; Drama
- Written by: Adam Sedlák
- Directed by: Adam Sedlák
- Starring: Petr Uhlík; Luciana Tomášová; Martina Jindrová; Tadeáš Moravec; Kristýna Jedličková
- Theme music composer: Oliver Torr
- Opening theme: Adikts theme
- Composer: Oliver Torr
- Country of origin: Czech Republic
- Original language: Czech
- No. of seasons: 1
- No. of episodes: 6

Production
- Executive producer: Romana Špiková (ČT)
- Producers: Jana Matoušek (ČAP); Jakub Jíra (Shore Points); Kryštof Zelenka (Shore Points)
- Camera setup: Dušan Husár
- Running time: 30 minutes
- Production company: Shore Points

Original release
- Network: iVysílání
- Release: 9 January 2024

Adikts is a comedy drama television series directed by Adam Sedlák. It was produced in cooperation between Czech Television, Czech Insurance Association and Police of the Czech Republic. The series was released on 9 January 2024 on iVysílání while on 24 January 2024 it starts broadcast on ČT1.

== Plot ==
Max, Mell, Ema, Robin and Soňa are students of addictology who decide to do an experiment - take drugs that can temporarily solve problems of each of them. Contrary to their expectations the effect of drugs becomes permanent for everyone.

== Cast ==
- Petr Uhlík as Max Bergman
- Luciana Tomášová as Mell
- Martina Jindrová as Soňa Vernerová
- Tadeáš Moravec as Robin Čermák
- Kristýna Jedličková as Ema Kovářová
- Lenka Dusilová as prof. Dagmar Jensenová
- Jan Hájek as prof. Jelínek
- Kristýna Martanovičová as Carmen
- Barbora Bočková as PhD student
- Jana Kolesárová as minister, Carmen's mother

== Episodes ==
No.	Title	Written by	Original release date	Original air date (ČT1)	Czech viewers (millions)
1	"Adiktologové"	Adam Sedlák	9 January 2024	24 January 2024	N/A
2	"Zkratky"	Adam Sedlák	9 January 2024	31 January 2024	0.195
3	"Superpowers, dědek"	Adam Sedlák	9 January 2024	7 February 2024	N/A
4	"Shit happens"	Adam Sedlák	9 January 2024	14 February 2024	N/A
5	"Nespalme to krásné v nás"	Adam Sedlák	9 January 2024	21 February 2024	N/A
6	"Průvodci"	Adam Sedlák	9 January 2024	28 February 2024	N/A

== Reception ==
The series was successful among young audience and had strong views on IVysílání but received negative criticism from addictologists, health professionals and people who have gone through drug addiction (eg Tereza Pergnerová). They stated that the series stigmatizes drug users. According to the organization Sananim, which deals with helping drug addicts, the series has nothing to do with addiction. Addictologist Aleš Kuda also criticized the series. According to Adam Sedlák, however, the series fulfilled its purpose because it sparked a debate on the topic.
