= Ratolesti =

- Genre: Crime, Drama
- Written by: Tomáš Feřtek; Matěj Podzimek
- Directed by: Michal Blaško
- Starring: Anna Geislerová; Stanislav Majer; Tomas Sean Pšenička; Matouš Ruml; Milena Steinmasslová
- Country of origin: Czech Republic
- Original language: Czech
- No. of seasons: 1
- No. of episodes: 10

Production
- Running time: 60 minutes

Original release
- Network: ČT1
- Release: October 5, 2025 – present

Ratolesti (English: Sprouts) is a Czech drama television series, that premiered on Czech Television in 2025. The series focuses on the clash between professional and parental life in the context of current social problems. Individual episodes address issues such as drugs, gender identity, or value conflicts in education.

It is a loose sequel to the series The Defender. According to the series' creative producer, Jan Maxa, however, it differs from its predecessor: "The Protector was very much about how the education system actually deals with children who are different or complex and do not fit into the standard. Ratolesti is primarily about how difficult it is to find out what is going on in our children's heads".

The main roles were played by Anna Geislerová, Stanislav Majer, Matouš Ruml, Tomas Sean Pšenička and Milena Steinmasslová. The first episode of the series premiered on Sunday, October 5, 2025, on ČT1 in prime time.

Along with the series, Czech Television launched new content on the educational portal ČT edu called "Nebuďte na to sami" ("Don't Face It Alone"), aimed at supporting teachers, students, and parents. The goal of the project is to provide help and information to those who are dealing with challenging life situations at school or in the family.

== Cast ==
=== Main ===
- Anna Geislerová as Hana Velková, addictionist, Karel's wife and Jiří's sister
- Stanislav Majer as Karel Velek, Gymnasium headmaster
- Matouš Ruml as Jiří Kolář, policeman and Hana's brother
- Tomas Sean Pšenička as Jan Velek, son of Hana and Karel
- Milena Steinmasslová as Ludmila Kolářová, Jan's grandma

=== Supporting ===
- Matyáš Řezníček as Martin Wajsar
- Saša Rašilov as Marek Hilský, Karel's friend
- Tomáš Dalecký as Radek Hilský
- Linda Rybová as mother Sirotková
- Josefína Prachařová as Lenka Sirotková
- Anna Červeňová as Eva Hoffmanová
- Peter Bebjak as František Bulan
- Luciana Tomášová as teacher Vášová
- Magdaléna Borová as teacher Drhová
- Eva Leimbergerová as teacher Bílková
- Adam Kraus as teacher Liška
- Kristýna Badinková Nováková as headmaster Fárová
- Marika Šoposká as deputy headmaster Bittnerová
- Lukáš Hejlík as mayor Navara
- Lukáš Jůza as councillor Drha
- Michal Balcar as policemanPilný
- Vratislav Brabenec as Petr Týma
- Tereza Hof as Kateřina Lehká
- Jan Grundman as Stanislav Lehký
- Kristián Laštovka as Šimon Lehký

== Production ==
The series was directed by Michal Blaško, and the script was written by Tomáš Feřtek and Matěj Podzimek. Story was inspired by real-life cases and criminal cases. The series was filmed from March to October 2024, mainly in the South Bohemian Region, especially in Tábor, and the first episode of the series was shot in March 2024 in Kralupy nad Vltavou.

== Episodes ==
| No. | Title | Directed by | Original release date | Czech viewers (millions) |
|---|---|---|---|---|
| 1 | "Mravenci" | Michal Blaško | October 5, 2025 | 0.847 |
| 2 | "Brácha" | Michal Blaško | October 12, 2025 | 0.713 |
| 3 | "Půl pravdy" | Michal Blaško | October 19, 2025 | 0.631 |
| 4 | "Ode dna" | Michal Blaško | October 26, 2025 | N/A |
| 5 | "Moje dítě, můj hrad" | Michal Blaško | November 2, 2025 | N/A |
| 6 | "Slepejš" | Michal Blaško | November 9, 2025 | N/A |
| 7 | "Rodina" | Michal Blaško | November 16, 2025 | N/A |
| 8 | "Volný pád" | Michal Blaško | November 23, 2025 | N/A |
| 9 | "Ranařka" | Michal Blaško | November 30, 2025 | N/A |
| 10 | "Ratolesti" | Michal Blaško | December 7, 2025 | N/A |
