= Abaku =

Czech number-based board game and browser game

Abaku is a Czech number-based board game and browser game used in mathematics education. In the game, players place digit tiles on a board to form valid arithmetic operations without writing mathematical symbols. Czech media have described Abaku as a numerical game comparable in principle to word-based tile-placement games such as Scrabble, and have reported on both its physical and online forms.

== Independent media coverage ==
Czech Television covered Abaku in a 2013 ČT24 article, describing it as an original Czech numerical game with both computer and board-game versions and discussing its use in schools. In 2015, Lidovky.cz published an article about Abaku as a Czech social game used in mathematics teaching, including an interview with Vladimír Tesař about the game and its principles.

Czech Television also covered Abaku in children's programming. In 2016, Planeta Yó broadcast a board-game review of Abaku. The same programme separately broadcast a report about the Abaku school league. The Czech Television programme Wifina also featured Abaku in a segment on leisure activities.

Czech Radio Ostrava broadcast a 2024 report about an Abaku tournament in Ostrava, describing Abaku as an original Czech game and method supporting arithmetic.

== Gameplay ==
Abaku is played with number tiles. Players arrange digits horizontally or vertically so that the resulting sequences represent valid arithmetic operations. The principle has been compared to Scrabble, but with numbers instead of letters.

The online version has been presented as Abaku PLAY, while school-oriented use has also been associated with Abaku LAB.

== Educational use ==
Abaku has been used in Czech mathematics education as a didactic environment for practising arithmetic relationships. H-mat, the organisation associated with the Hejný method of mathematics teaching, describes Abaku as an environment whose main aim is to strengthen basic arithmetic connections, including addition and multiplication facts.

A 2021 article in the journal Učitel matematiky analysed the Abaku learning environment as a tool for investigating the idea of an additive triad. The article presents classroom activities using Abaku to support pupils' understanding of equality, left-to-right reading of equations and commutativity.

== School competition ==
Abaku is also used in a Czech school competition known as Liga Abaku. The Society of Czech Mathematicians and Physicists describes Liga Abaku as a nationwide school online competition in the number game Abaku.

The Faculty of Education of Charles University hosted the final of the national school league in 2017 in cooperation with Mensa Czech Republic and Abaku. According to the faculty's event listing, 50 pupils qualified for the final. Mensa Czech Republic also lists the Abaku school league among its projects for pupils and teachers.

== Recognition ==
Abaku PLAY was listed as an Academics' Choice Award winner in the category "Game, Website".
