= CT3 =

CT3 or CT-3 may refer to:

- Chris Taylor (baseball), American baseball player
- Connecticut's 3rd congressional district
- Connecticut Route 3, state route
- Crazy Taxi 3: High Roller
- CT-3 needle for surgical suturing
- Route CT3 (MBTA), a bus route in Boston
- ČT3, Czech public television channel
