= Game Story =

- Genre: Documentary
- Written by: Jan Vejnar; Jan Smutný; Štěpán Vodrážka
- Directed by: Štěpán Vodrážka
- Country of origin: Czech Republic
- Original language: Czech
- No. of seasons: 1
- No. of episodes: 10

Production
- Running time: 12–17 minutes

Original release
- Network: IVysílání
- Release: 6 April 2024

Game Story is a Czech documentary series that maps history of video game development in the Czech Republic. All 10 episodes were released on 6 April 2024. It was originally announced as Bitová Generace (Bit Generation).

The series starts with 1980s video gaming in the Czech Republic focusing on František Fuka and Golden Triangle which also included Miroslav Fídler a Tomáš Rylek. The series then shows 1990s Brno gaming community where Jarek Kolář and Petr Vlček formed Pterodon Software creating first major adventure games. They later continued development under Petr Vochozka's company. The series also shows 1990s gaming community and video gaming journalism in 1990s. Major focus is on creation of various major video game titles such as Operation Flashpoint: Cold War Crisis, Mafia, Samorost, Euro Truck Simulator, Factorio or Beat Saber.

== Episodes ==
No.	Title	Written by	Original release date	Original air date (ČT2)	Czech viewers (millions)
1	"Virus"	Unknown	6 April 2024	TBA	N/A
2	"Klíče"	Unknown	6 April 2024	TBA	N/A
3	"Komunita"	Unknown	6 April 2024	TBA	N/A
4	"Záblesk"	Unknown	6 April 2024	TBA	N/A
5	"Samorost"	Unknown	6 April 2024	TBA	N/A
6	"Receptář"	Unknown	6 April 2024	TBA	N/A
7	"Pán jeskyně"	Unknown	6 April 2024	TBA	N/A
8	"Továrna"	Unknown	6 April 2024	TBA	N/A
9	"Vrchol"	Unknown	6 April 2024	TBA	N/A
10	"Holki"	Unknown	6 April 2024	TBA	N/A
