= ČT HD =

Czech television channel

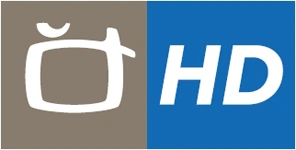
- Country: Czech Republic
- Headquarters: Prague

Programming
- Picture format: 1080i /25 (HDTV)

Ownership
- Owner: Czech Television
- Sister channels: ČT1; ČT2; ČT4; ČT24

History
- Launched: 31 August 2009
- Closed: 1 March 2012
- Replaced by: ČT1 HD, ČT2 HD and ČT Sport HD

ČT HD was the high-definition TV channel from Czech Television. ČT HD broadcast programming from ČT1, ČT2 and ČT4, via IPTV, digital terrestrial (in several areas only) and satellite (via Astra 1E – DVB-S standard, since spring 2010 via the new Astra 3B – DVB-S2 standard).
