= OK3 =

OK3 may refer to:

- OK3 (television), Czechoslovakia television station
- OK3, trio of basketball players on the 2017–18 Oklahoma City Thunder team
