= Luciana Tomášová =

Czech actress and singer (born 1997)

- Born: 1997; Česká Lípa, Czech Republic
- Education: DAMU
- Occupations: Actress, singer
- Years active: c. 2018–present
- Height: 166 cm (5 ft 5 in)

Luciana Tomášová (born 1997) is a Czech actress and singer. She starred in the 2024 Czech television series Adikts and the 2025 series Ratolesti.

Tomášová is from Nový Bor. She studied drama acting at DAMU in Prague and is a member of the ensemble at the Činoherní studio in Ústí nad Labem. She sings in the Brno-Prague band Luciana.

In 2026, she is participating in the 14th season of Czech dancing reality TV show StarDance with her professional partner Robin Ondráček.

== Selected filmography ==
=== Films ===
- Kde končí láska (2025)

=== TV series ===
- Adikts (2024)
- Oktopus (2025)
- Ratolesti (2025)
