= ČTV =

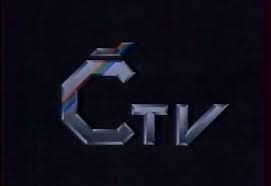
- Country: Czech Republic

Programming
- Language: Czech

Ownership
- Owner: Czech Television
- Sister channels: OK3; F1

History
- Launched: 3 September 1990; 35 years ago
- Closed: 31 December 1992; 33 years ago

ČTV was a television channel of Czechoslovak Television and later Czech Television station that broadcast in Czechia in 1990–1992. It was the successor of II. program and in 1993 it was replaced by station ČT1. In Slovakia, its equivalent was S1.

== History ==
After the Velvet Revolution in 1989, Czechoslovak Television (ČST) started broadcasting its third station, OK3, in May 1990. Further changes took place on September 3, 1990, when the existing ČST I program became the nationwide federal channel F1. the program was divided into two national stations: the Czech ČTV and the Slovak S1. On January 1, 1992, an independent Czech Television was established, which became the broadcaster of ČTV. Its broadcast was originally encoded in SECAM standard, but the change occurred on July 1, 1992, when CTV began using the PAL standard. The ČTV station ceased operations with the dissolution of Czechoslovakia on December 31, 1992, and was replaced by ČT1 from January 1, 1993.
