= ČT Sport =

- Country: Czech Republic
- Broadcast area: Czech Republic, reaching bordering regions via overspill of the Czech terrestrial network

Programming
- Picture format: 16:9 1080i /25 (HDTV)

Ownership
- Owner: Czech Television
- Sister channels: ČT1; ČT2; ČT24; ČT :D; ČT art

History
- Launched: 10 February 2006; 20 years ago
- Former names: ČT4 Sport (2006–2008); ČT4 (2008–2012)

Links
- Website: Official website

Availability

Terrestrial
- DVB-T/T2: MUX 21 (FTA) (HD)

Streaming media
- ČT Sport Online: Watch live (Czech only)

ČT Sport (known as ČT4 Sport from 2006 to 2008 and ČT4 from 2008 to 2012) is a Czech national sports channel operated by Czech Television.

== History ==
ČT Sport was launched as ČT4 Sport on 10 February 2006 to promote digital television. Its main programming includes association football, ice hockey, the Olympic Games, athletics, and various European events.

In January 2008, the channel began broadcasting in 16:9 widescreen format. The same year it dropped "Sport" from its name, becoming "ČT4." Following a full rebranding of Česká televize in September 2012, the channel's name was changed to "ČT Sport."

The channel is available through digital terrestrial television, satellite, and cable operators.

== ČT Sport HD ==
The former logo of ČT Sport HD

ČT Sport HD is the high-definition simulcast of ČT Sport, launched on 3 May 2012. The channel is available via IPTV, digital terrestrial (in select areas), and satellite (via Astra 3B – DVB-S2 standard).

Previously, HD programming was shown on ČT HD, which covered ČT1, ČT2, and ČT4.

== Sport ==
=== Athletics ===
- World Athletics Indoor Championships
- World Athletics Championships

=== Basketball ===
- FIBA Basketball World Cup
- FIBA Women's Basketball World Cup
- FIBA EuroBasket
- FIBA Women's EuroBasket
- National Basketball League

=== Cycling ===
- Tour de France
- Tour of Flanders
- UCI Road World Championships

=== Floorball ===
- Men's, Women's and Under-19 World Floorball Championships
- Champions Cup
- Czech Open
- Livesport Superliga

=== Football ===
- Chance Národní Liga
- MOL Cup
- FIFA World Cup
- UEFA European Championship
- UEFA Europa League
- UEFA Europa Conference League
- UEFA Nations League

=== Ice Hockey ===
- Maxa Liga
- Ice Hockey World Championship
- Spengler Cup
- Tipsport Extraliga

=== Motorsport ===
- Dakar Rally
- Czech Rally Championship
- World Rally Championships

=== Multi-sport Event ===
- European Championships
- European Games
- Olympic Summer Games
- Olympic Winter Games
- Paralympic Summer Games
- Paralympic Winter Games

=== Tennis ===
- ATP Cup
- Billie Jean King Cup
- Davis Cup

=== Winter Sports ===
- Biathlon World Championships
- FIS Alpine Ski World Cup
- FIS Cross-Country World Cup
- FIS Ski Jumping World Cup
- FIS Snowboard World Cup
- FIS Alpine World Ski Championships
- FIS Freestyle World Ski Championships
- FIS Nordic World Ski Championships
- FIS Ski Flying World Championships
- FIS Snowboarding World Championships
- Four Hills Tournament
- IBU Biathlon World Cup
- ISU Speed Skating World Cup
- World Single Distances Speed Skating Championships for Women

=== Volleyball ===
- Czech Men's Volleyball Extraliga
- Czech Women's Volleyball Extraliga
- FIVB Volleyball Men's World Championship
- FIVB Volleyball Women's World Championship
- Men's European Volleyball Championship
- Women's European Volleyball Championship

== Logos ==
ČT4 Sport logo from 2006 to 2007

ČT4 Sport logo from 2007 to 2008

ČT4 logo from 2008 to 2012

ČT Sport logo from 2012 to 2013
