= ČT2 =

Czech television channel

- Country: Czech Republic
- Broadcast area: Czech Republic, reaching bordering regions via overspill of the Czech terrestrial network

Programming
- Language: Czech
- Picture format: 16:9 576i (SDTV); 16:9 1080i (HDTV)

Ownership
- Owner: Czech Television
- Sister channels: ČT1; ČT24; ČT Sport; ČT :D; ČT art

History
- Launched: 10 May 1970; 56 years ago
- Former names: ČST2 (1970–1990); ČTV (1990–1993)

Links
- Website: Official website

Availability

Terrestrial
- DVB-T/T2: MUX 21 (FTA) (HD)

Streaming media
- iVysílání: Watch live (Czech only)

ČT2 (ČT Dva, Česká televise 2, "Dvojka") is the Czech public television channel, operated by Czech Television. ČT2 broadcasts documentaries nature-oriented shows, frequently showing foreign films in the original versions with Czech subtitles, including many English-language movies and features some of the important sports events (i.e. Olympic Games, FIFA World Cup or UEFA European Football Championship).

== Programs ==
=== Series ===
- Bates Motel (Batesův motel)
- House of Cards (Dům z karet)
- The Walking Dead (Živí mrtví)
- Light as a Feather (Lehké jako pírko)
- The Night Manager (Noční recepční)
- Red Dwarf (Červený trpaslík)

=== Formerly broadcast ===
- Downton Abbey (Panství Downton)
- The Borgias (Borgiové)
- Game of Thrones (Hra o trůny)
- The Simpsons (Simpsonovi)

=== Sport ===
- UEFA Europa League
- UEFA Europa Conference League

=== Documentary ===
- Alkohol - magický lektvar
- Mayday
- Národní klenoty
- Tajemství 2. světové války

== ČT2 HD ==
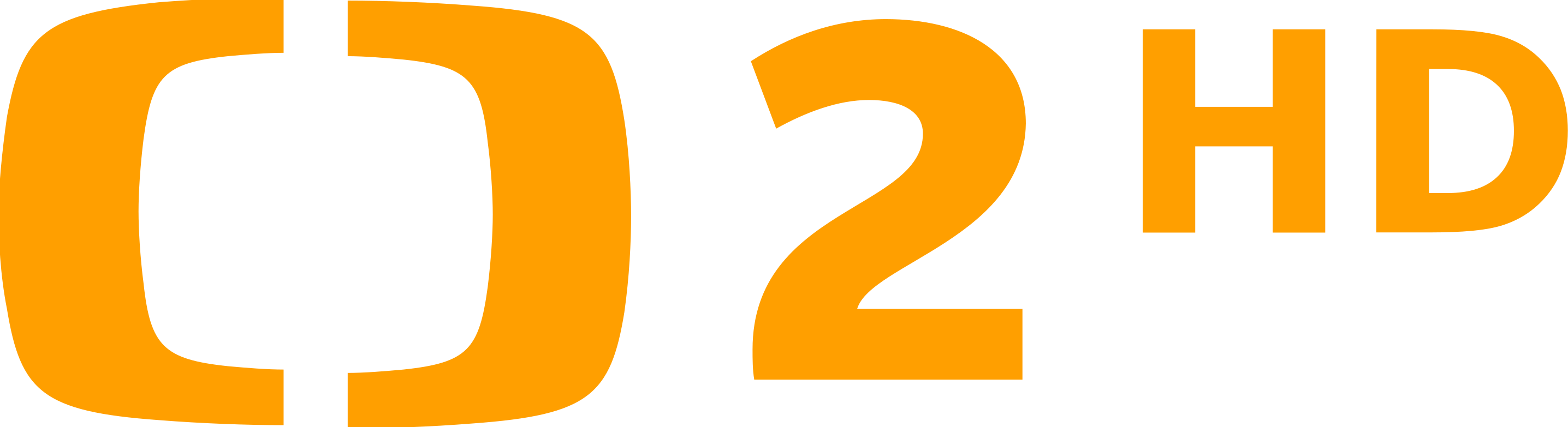
Logo of ČT2 HD

ČT2 HD is the high-definition TV channel from Czech Television. ČT2 HD broadcasts programming from ČT2 via IPTV, digital terrestrial and satellite (via Astra 3B – DVB-S2 standard).

Previously HD programming was shown on ČT HD, covering ČT1, ČT2, and ČT4.

== Logos ==
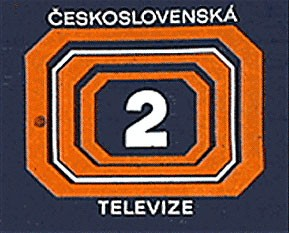
ČST 2 logo (1970–1990)

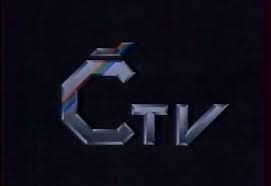
ČTV logo used from 4 December 1990 to 31 December 1992

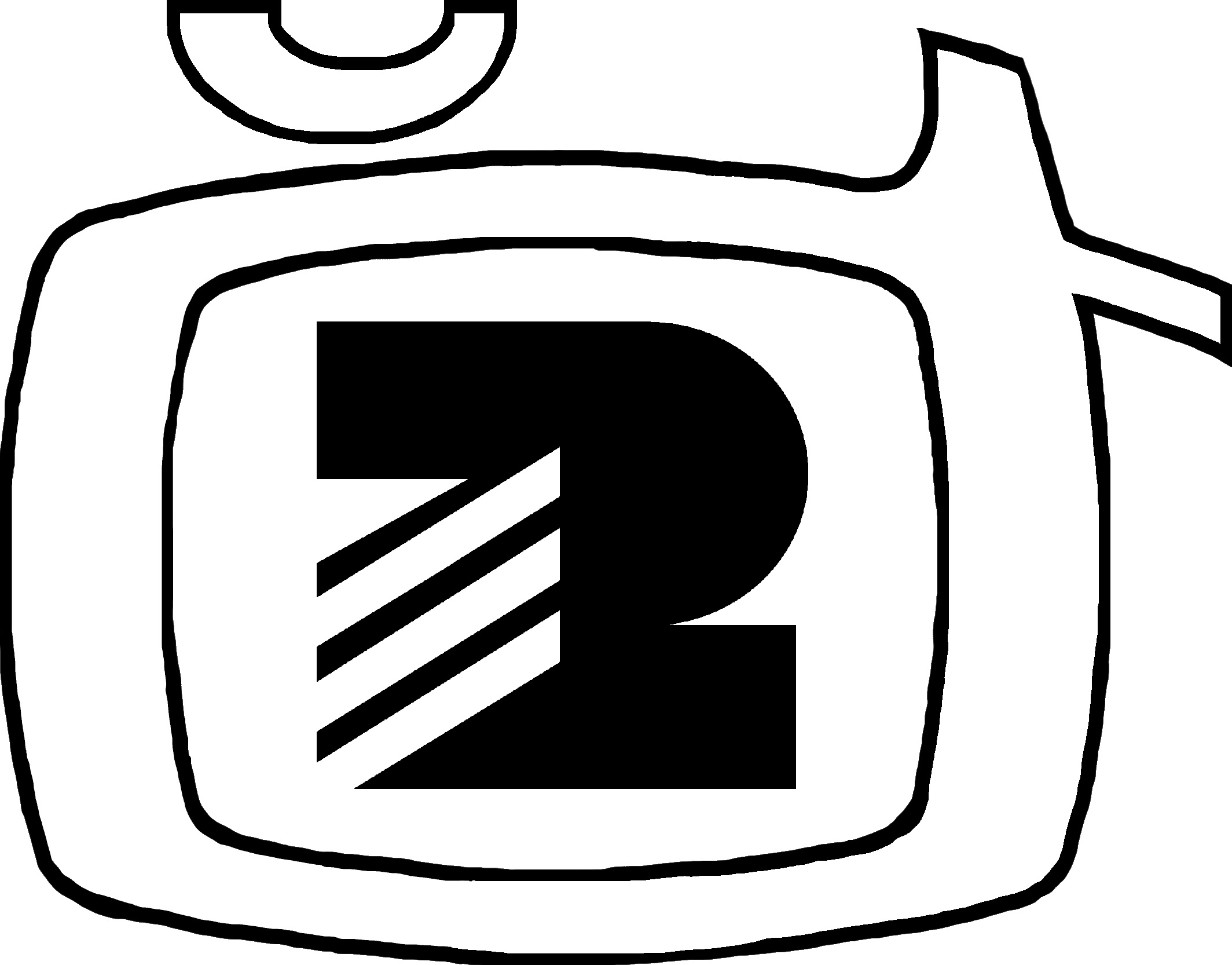
First logo used from 1 January 1993 to 2 September 1994

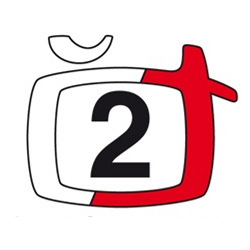
ČT2 logo used from 3 September 1994 to 31 August 2007

ČT2 logo used from 1 September 2007 to 1 October 2012

== See also ==
- Television in the Czech Republic
- ČT1
- ČT HD
- Telecommunications in the Czech Republic
