= OK3 (TV channel) =

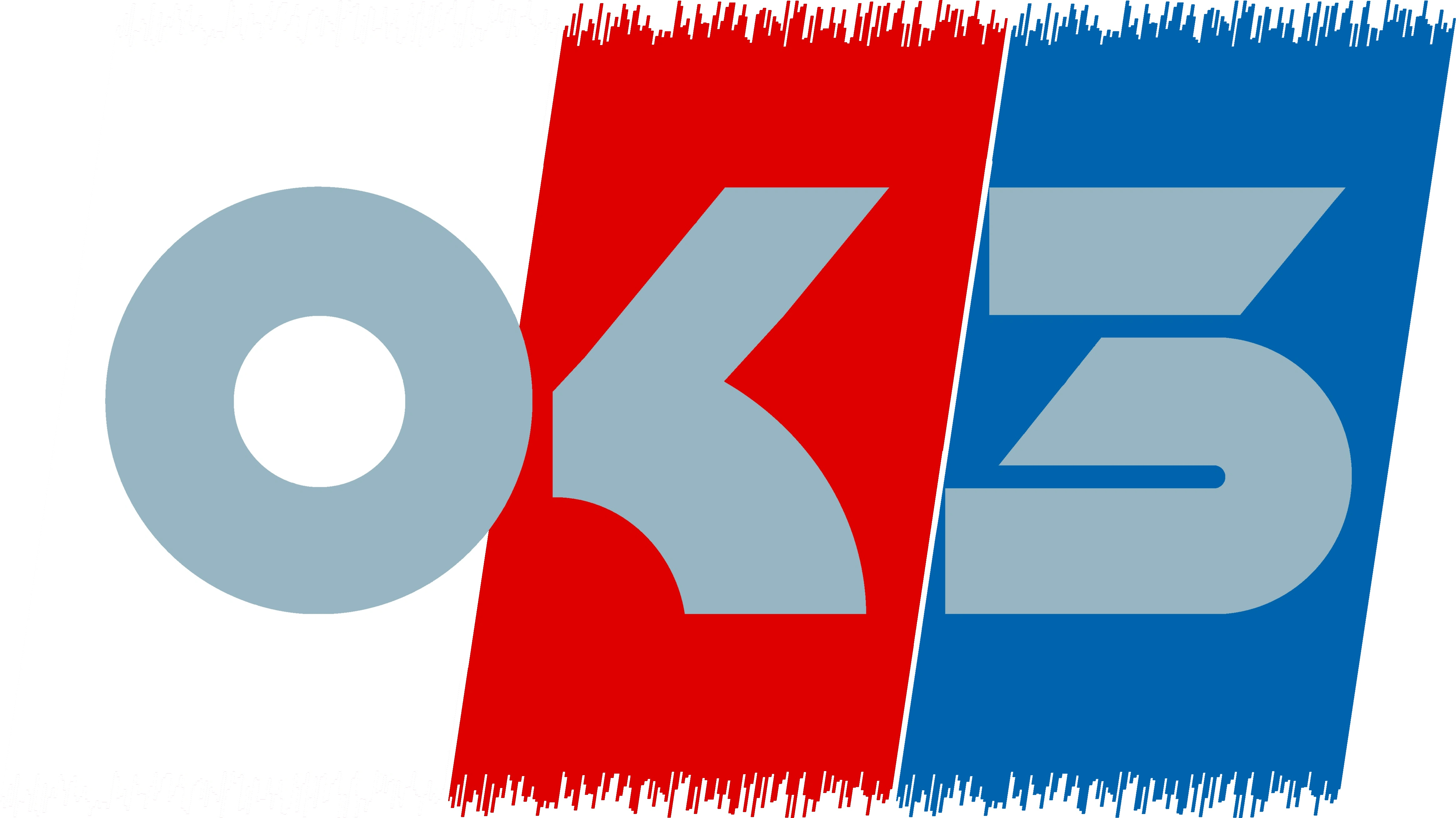
- Country: Czech Republic

Programming
- Language(s): Czech

Ownership
- Owner: Czech Television
- Sister channels: ČTV; F1; TA3

History
- Launched: 14 May 1990; 34 years ago
- Closed: 31 December 1992; 32 years ago

OK3 (Otevřený kanál 3) was the Czech public television channel, operated by Czechoslovak Television and then by Czech Television, which broadcast mainly foreign-language programs in the original version in the Czech lands from May 1990 to December 1992. In 1993 it was replaced by the channel ČT3 in the Czech Republic. TA3 was the Slovak counterpart of the channel.

== History ==
In February 1990, Czechoslovak Television (ČST) decided to create a third channel, which eventually received the designation OK3 (short for Otevřený kanál tři – Open channel three). The latter used the frequency network used for broadcasting Soviet Central Television at that time.

The station began operations on 14 May 1990, the broadcast was coded in the PAL standard (ČST used the SECAM standard until then). Even before the establishment of the independent Slovak Television, the broadcasting of OK3 in Slovakia was terminated, where it was replaced by the new Slovak channel TA3 on 1 April 1991. On 1 January 1992, Česká televize was established, which became the broadcasting operator of OK3, which had been limited to the Czech Republic only since the spring of the previous year. The OK3 channel ceased operations with the dissolution of Czechoslovakia on 31 December 1992, and was replaced by the ČT3 station from 1 January 1993.

== Programming ==
Programming consisted mainly of those acquired from world satellite television broadcasters, mainly CNN, MCM, TV5, RTL, La Sept, Rai 1 and others. Language courses and the nightly erotic show/competition Tutti Frutti produced by RTL were also broadcast. Most of the programs were in their original language form without translation. However, OK3 also featured programs from emerging independent Czech production companies, including so-called quick dubbings. Initially, the station OK3 broadcast from 16:00 to 23:00.
