= IVysílání =

Czech streaming video platform

Logo

iVysílání is a streaming platform operated by Czech Television. It provides viewers with access to a wide range of television programmes produced by Czech Television, as well as films and shows licensed to the network. All content can be streamed for free, including live broadcasts of Czech Television channels.

== History ==
At the end of the 20th century, Czech Television began to trial live internet broadcasting, initially only news programmes. At that time, internet broadcasting did not yet bear the name iVysílání. The beta version of iVysílání launched in 2009. iVysílání was launched in 2009, but it was still significantly different from its later form. Users had the option to play one of the programmes from the archive or watch a live broadcast, but it had to be an original production of Czech Television. There were three different video qualities to choose from: low, medium and TV. TV quality video had a bit rate of 1.5 Mb/s. It was also possible to choose one of two possible multimedia players, which were Windows Media Player and RealPlayer.

In September 2011 ČT launched a version for Android. In July 2013 it became available as HbbTV service. In 2017 iVysílání stopped using Adobe Flash. In September 2020 iVysílání changed its appearance to be more similar to Netflix. In May 2021 Ackee became developer for iVysílání applications.

Until 2014 iVysílání was operated by KIT digital Czech, but due to complaints from sport fans, Czech Television decided to change the operator. České Radiokomunikace was speculated by media to be the likeliest new operator, but it decided to not participate in the tender. Telefónica Czech Republic, T-Mobile, Livebox, and current operator Visual Unity (renamed from KIT digital Czech) decided to participate. Telefónica eventually won the tender and became the new operator for 2015 and 2016.

The Telefónica (now O2) contract ended in 2016 when ČT launched a new tender. O2, T-Mobile, Livebox, and SuperNetwork initially participated, but only SuperNetwork managed to submit the required materials in time. Thus, other companies were excluded which led Czech Television to cancel the tender. A new tender was started in 2017, and was won by SuperNetwork. Cooperation with SuperNetwork started in May 2018, but Czech Television terminated the contract soon afterwards due to contract violations, and decided to return to O2.

== Content ==
=== Original programming ===
Czech Television produced several series that were originally released on iVysílání before being broadcast on Television. ČT also produces series available only on iVysílání. These series are usually targeted to a young audience that doesn't watch television as much as previous generations.

Voyo original programming
Title	Genre	Original release	Seasons	Episodes	Notes
TBH	Drama	17 February 2022	1	10	First web series by Czech Television.
Pět let	Drama	26 September 2022	1	10	
Dobré ráno, Brno!	Comedy	31 December 2022	1	1	Only first episode. The rest were broadcast on ČT1.
teleRevize	Documentary	21 February 2023-current	2	20	
Pickupeři	Documentary	13 December 2023	1	6	
Adikts	Comedy/Drama	9 January 2024	1	6	
Dakar Sistaz	Sport Documentary	14 March 2024	1	3	
Game Story	Documentary	6 April 2024	1	10	
Vlastně se nic nestalo	Drama	29 September 2024	1		
