= ČT art =

Czech national television channel

- Country: Czech Republic
- Broadcast area: Czech Republic; Slovakia

Programming
- Language: Czech
- Picture format: 1080i (HDTV)

Ownership
- Owner: Czech Television
- Sister channels: ČT1; ČT2; ČT24; ČT Sport; ČT :D

History
- Launched: 31 August 2013; 12 years ago

Links
- Website: art.ceskatelevize.cz

Availability

Terrestrial
- DVB-T/T2: MUX 21 (FTA) (HD)

Streaming media
- iVysílání: Watch live

ČT art is a Czech national television channel operated by Czech Television specialising in cultural content. The channel began broadcasting on 31 August 2013, with Tomáš Motl being its first executive director.

ČT art broadcasts from 8 pm to 6 am, and shares its frequency with children's channel ČT :D which uses the remaining hours.

== Programming ==
Each day begins with the news programme Události v kultuře (lit. 'News in culture'), except on Sunday where Týden v kultuře (lit. 'Week in culture') airs instead. These are supplemented by inputs from live events and current affairs talk shows with cultural themes. Across the week, each day is given a theme for programming:

- Monday – Z první řady (The first row), student work, work from Slovenská televízia.
- Tuesday – ArtZóna
- Wednesday – Klobouk dolů
- Tuesday – Životy slavných
- Friday – Pop-rockové podium
- Saturday – Je nám ctí – celebrities, topics or events, musical show Tečka za sobotní nocí.
- Sunday – World art films, classical music.

Czech Television stated that if ČT Déčko and ČT art proved successful, the two channels would broadcast from separate frequencies and allowing them to broadcast daily.
