= Telecommunications in the Czech Republic =

There are telecommunications in the Czech Republic.

== Office ==
There is a Czech Telecommunication Office (Czech: Český Telekomunikační Úřad) called CTU.

== Companies ==
Telecom companies have included České Radiokomunikace, O2 Czech Republic (formerly Telefónica O2 Czech Republic), Vodafone Czech Republic (formerly Oskar Mobil a.s.), CETIN, CS Link, Eurotel, Skylink and Telekom Austria Czech Republic.

== Telephones ==
The number of main line telephones in use was 3,741,492 in 1998, 3.869 million in 2000, 3.626 million in 2003, 2.888 million in 2006, and 1,294,806 in 2021. The number of mobile cellular phones was 965,476 in 1998, 4.346 million in 2000, 9.708 million in 2003, and 13.075 million in 2007.

Copper subscriber systems have been improved with Asymmetric Digital Subscriber Line (ADSL) equipment to accommodate Internet and other digital signals. Trunk systems include fibre-optic cable and microwave radio relay.

== Television ==
There were 3,428,817 televisions in December 1999 and 3,405,834 televisions in December 2000. There were 150 television broadcast stations and 1,434 repeaters in 2000.

== Radio ==
There were 3,173,856 radios in December 1999, and 3,159,134 radios in December 2000. In 2000, the radio broadcast stations were AM 31, FM 304 and shortwave 17. In 1999, they were AM 21, FM 199 and shortwave 1.

== Internet ==
The number of internet users was 2.69 million in 2001, 5.1 million in 2005, 4.4 million in 2007 and 7.6 million in 2012. There were 35 Internet Service Providers in 1999, and more than three hundred in 2000.

The internet country code is .cz.
