= České Radiokomunikace =

Czech telecommunications company

České Radiokomunikace, a.s.
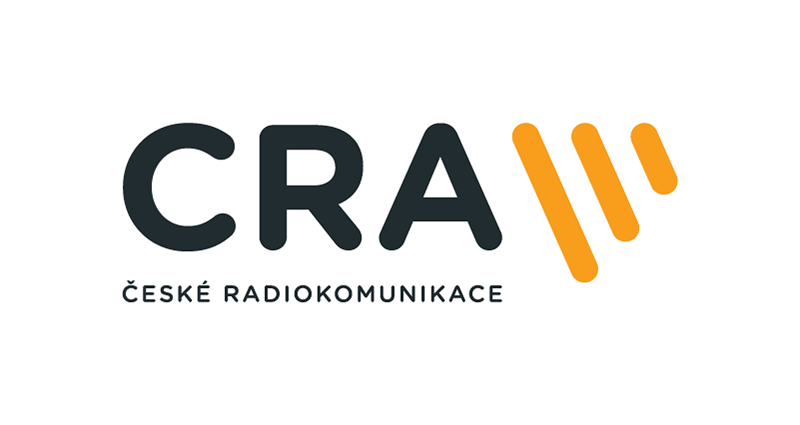
- Company type: Corporation (Public limited company)
- Founded: 1963
- Headquarters: Prague, Czech Republic
- Key people: Miloš Mastník, CEO
- Products: Media, telco, DC&Cloud
- Services: Telecommunications, IoT, Cloud, Data Center
- Revenue: 1,764,115,000 Czech koruna (2018)
- Total assets: 8,347,842,000 Czech koruna (2019)
- Owner: Cordiant Digital Infrastructure
- Number of employees: 320
- Website: Official website

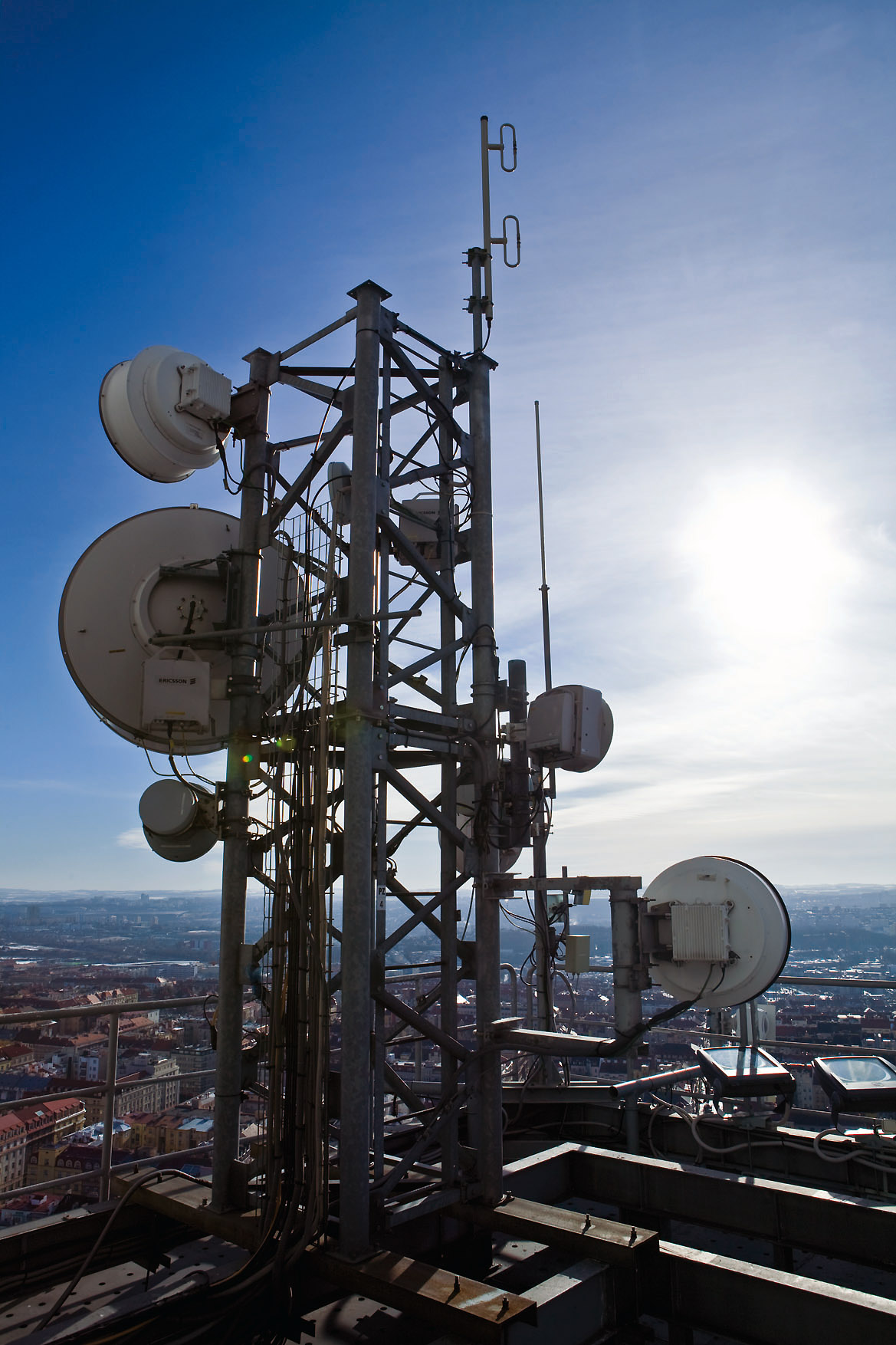
Antennas of Žižkov broadcasting tower

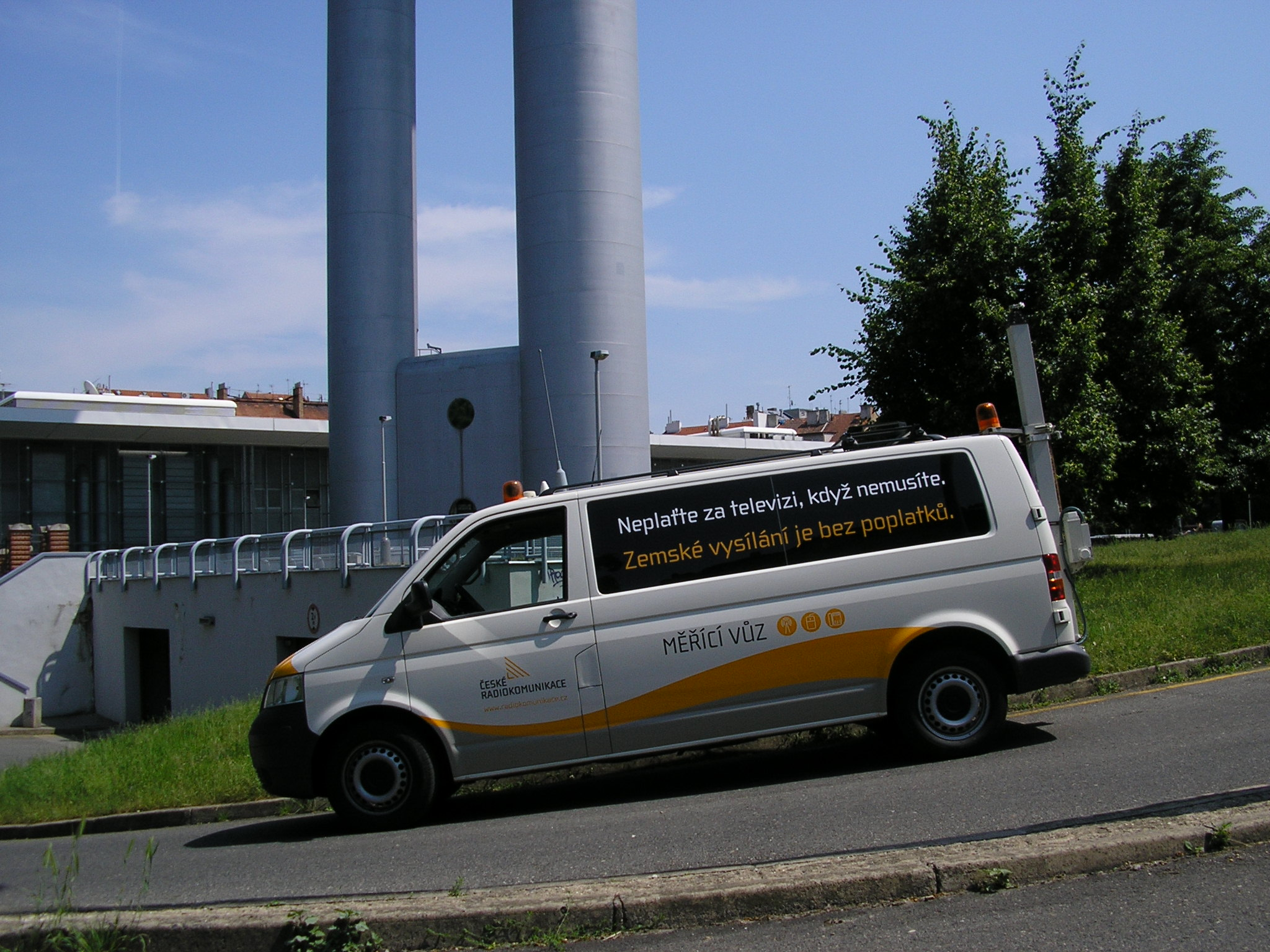
Car of České Radiokomunikace near Žižkov transmission tower

České Radiokomunikace is a company in the Czech Republic specialized in telecommunications and ICT services for wholesale and business customers, including wireless/optical options, voice services, internet connection, and data solutions (distributor of analog (AM/FM)/digital radio and digital TV).

== History ==
The company was founded in 1963 under the name Správa radiokomunikací. During the Czech privatization (as a consequence of the communist regime ending in 1989), the company was transferred in 1994 to ČESKÉ RADIOKOMUNIKACE a.s. In the early 1990s, the company became an ISP to the country's government and large companies.

In 2001, the privatization was complete and the company started to distribute telecommunication and TV/radio airing. In 2003, the company added telephony and internet to its global offer.

In 2005, the company ceased to exist and all of its revenue was transferred to the JTR Management a.s. company, which was then promptly renamed to RADIOKOMUNIKACE a.s., while still using the trademark of ČESKÉ RADIOKOMUNIKACE. In 2006, the company got the stocks of the phone carrier Tele2, and changed its logo.

The company ceased in 2007 and its revenue was transferred to a company called BLJ Czech, a.s., which was immediately renamed to RADIOKOMUNIKACE a.s., and later (still in 2007) to České Radiokomunikace a.s.

In 2009, the company's local telecommunications division was bought by T-Mobile Czech Republic. A year later, the acquisition of the 3rd multiplex of the then new terrestrial TV (DVB-T) was completed by Czech Digital Group.

In 2011, the company ceased again, and its revenue was transferred to Morava Czech Communications Holdings a.s., which renamed itself back to České Radiokomunikace a.s. Right after that, the company was sold to Macquarie Infrastructure and Real Assets Europe for 14 billion CZK. The same year, the company entered the information and communication industry and started offering cloud computing services. In 2016, the company changed its logo again.

In May 2021, Macquarie sold České Radiokomunikace to the Canadian Cordiant Digital Infrastructure for an undisclosed amount.

== Property ==
The company owns more than 600 objects for their wireless signal distribution, which covers the entire country.
