= TA3 (TV channel, 1991–1992) =

- Country: Czechoslovakia
- Headquarters: Bratislava

Ownership
- Owner: Slovenská televízia

History
- Launched: 6 July 1991; 35 years ago
- Closed: 1 January 1993; 33 years ago

TA3 (Slovak pronunciation: [ˈteː aː ˈtri]) was a TV channel broadcast on the 3rd broadcasting circuit in the Slovak Republic (then a constituent republic within Czechoslovakia) from 1991 to 1993. The channel and OK3 in the Czech portion of the country used a transmitter network formerly used to broadcast Soviet Central Television. Its programming consisted mostly of retransmission of foreign news channels and alternative programming.

In 1993, provision was made to privatize TA3. The Slovak TV and Radio Committee issued a decision awarding the channel to two companies: Magnum, including former TA3 employees, and Ister, which had no connections in the company's media industry. This decision scandalized the sector as nobody in the trade was aware of the financial backing or even the finality of the decision. The privatization decision was swiftly annulled by Ivan Mjartan, the new minister of culture, in a decision that was likely illegal; ultimately, a dispute between the companies led to the deal collapsing.
