= ČT Déčko =

Czech television channel

- Country: Czechia
- Broadcast area: Czechia, reaching bordering regions via overspill of the Czech terrestrial network
- Headquarters: Déčkosvět, Kavčí hory, Prague, Czech Republic

Programming
- Language: Czech
- Picture format: 1080i HDTV (downscaled to 16:9 576i for the SDTV feed)

Ownership
- Owner: Czech Television
- Sister channels: ČT1; ČT2; ČT24; ČT Sport; ČT art

History
- Launched: 31 August 2013; 13 years ago

Links
- Website: Official website

Availability

Terrestrial
- DVB-T/T2: MUX 21 (FTA) (HD)

Streaming media
- iVysílání: Watch live (Czech only)
- ČT Déčko Online: Watch live (Czech & Slovak only)

ČT Déčko (styled on-air as () :D) is a Czech free-to-air television channel operated by Czech Television, specialising in children's content designed for viewers of 2 to 12 years of age. The channel began broadcasting on 31 August 2013, with Petr Koliha as its first executive director.

ČT Déčko broadcasts from 6 am to 8 pm, and shares its frequency with cultural channel ČT art, which uses the remaining hours.

== History ==
The proposal to establish a channel dedicated to younger audiences was part of Petr Dvořák's candidacy for CEO of Česká televise. In September 2012, executive director Petr Koliha, former artistic director of the Zlín Film Festival, was appointed three months later. By transferring its children's and cultural programs to ČT :D and ČT art, ČT2 was able to focus more on educational and cognitive content and Czech documentaries.

Česká televise registered possible names and graphic designs for the logo at the Industrial Property Office. Possible suggestions included ČT Juni, ČT D, ČT children, ČT Hi, ČT mini, mini ČT, ČT hele and the finally selected ČT :D, which symbolizes a smile.

== Programming ==
The station is open daily from 6:00 to 20:00, with ČT art broadcasting on the same frequency between 8 pm and the morning. ČT :D is intended for two audience groups: children aged 4–8 (57% of broadcasts), and children aged 8–15 (43% of broadcasts).

Czech Television stated in 2015 that if ČT Déčko and ČT art proved to be successful, the two channels could broadcast from separate frequencies in the future.

== Availability ==
Television broadcasts on multiplex 1a, which was created by extending the originally planned regional networks 7, 10, 20. From 9 October 2013 to 31 March 2018 it also spread its signal in the national czech Multiplex 3, with the newly established Prima Krimi channel taking over. From 24 April 2018, ČT :D / art is available in Multiplex 1.

High-definition (HD) broadcasting via satellite was started on 1 November 2016 using Astra 3B-capacities. On 29 March 2018 it broadcast in high definition in the transition network 11. ČT :D/ČT art HD is also available via satellite, cable TV and IPTV.

== Criticism ==
After launching the broadcast, the program ČT :D and, consequently, the sister program ČT art, which are broadcast on multiplex 1a, became a target of criticism due to difficulties tuning into this station. The most frequent reasons are insufficient signal coverage or a necessary change in the antenna system.

Critics claim that the advertised coverage of 80% of the Czech Republic by the multiplex 1a signal is unrealistic, and that even in areas where such coverage is already available, either a new antenna must be purchased, or the existing antenna must be redirected to a signal source, which loses the signal from other Multiplexes. The Chair of the Association of Directors and Screenwriters Ljuba Wenceslas wrote a complaint to the chairman of the Czech Television Council, Milan Uhda, asking him to explain the situation.
