= ČT24 =

- Country: Czech Republic
- Broadcast area: Czech Republic, reaching bordering regions via overspill of the Czech terrestrial network
- Headquarters: Kavčí hory, Prague, Czech Republic

Programming
- Language: Czech
- Picture format: 1080i (HDTV)

Ownership
- Owner: Czech Television
- Sister channels: ČT1; ČT2; ČT Sport; ČT :D; ČT art

History
- Launched: 2 May 2005; 21 years ago

Links
- Website: Official website

Availability

Terrestrial
- DVB-T/T2: MUX 21 (FTA) (HD)

Streaming media
- ČT24 Online: Watch live (Worldwide access is available)

ČT24 (Czech: [ˈtʃeːteːˈdvatsɛtˈt͡ʃtɪr̝ɪ]) is a 24-hour news channel in Czechia, owned and operated by Czech Television. The channel was launched on 2 May 2005.

ČT24 broadcasts from Prague, but has branches and broadcasts in Brno and Ostrava.

== History ==
The channel started broadcasting at 1pm on 2 May 2005, as the first project in Czech Television's digitalization plan. It was established as an expansion of its public service credentials, and not a "trap to increase advertising time".

== Broadcast ==
ČT24 broadcasts live over the internet, as well as over the satellites Astra 3B and Intelsat 10-02. It is carried on Czech cable-TV providers and digital terrestrial services.

=== HD ===
High-definition (HD) broadcasting via satellite started on 1 November 2016 using Astra 3B-capacities.

== Logos ==
ČT24 first logo from 2005 to 2007

ČT24 second logo from 2007 to 2012

ČT24 third logo from 2012 to 2020

== Format ==
ČT24 airs a short news bulletin every hour on the hour. This channel airs other shows including 90' ČT24, Hyde Park Civilizace, Věda 24, Horizont ČT24, Interview ČT24, Studio 6, Newsroom ČT24, Studio ČT24, Branky, body, vteřiny, Týden v kultuře, Události, Události, komentáře, Události v kultuře, Události v regionech, Týden v regionech, Zprávy v 12, Zprávy v 16, Zprávy v 23 and Předpověď počasí.
