= Czech Television =

Public broadcaster in the Czech Republic

Coordinates: 50°03′N 14°25.57′E

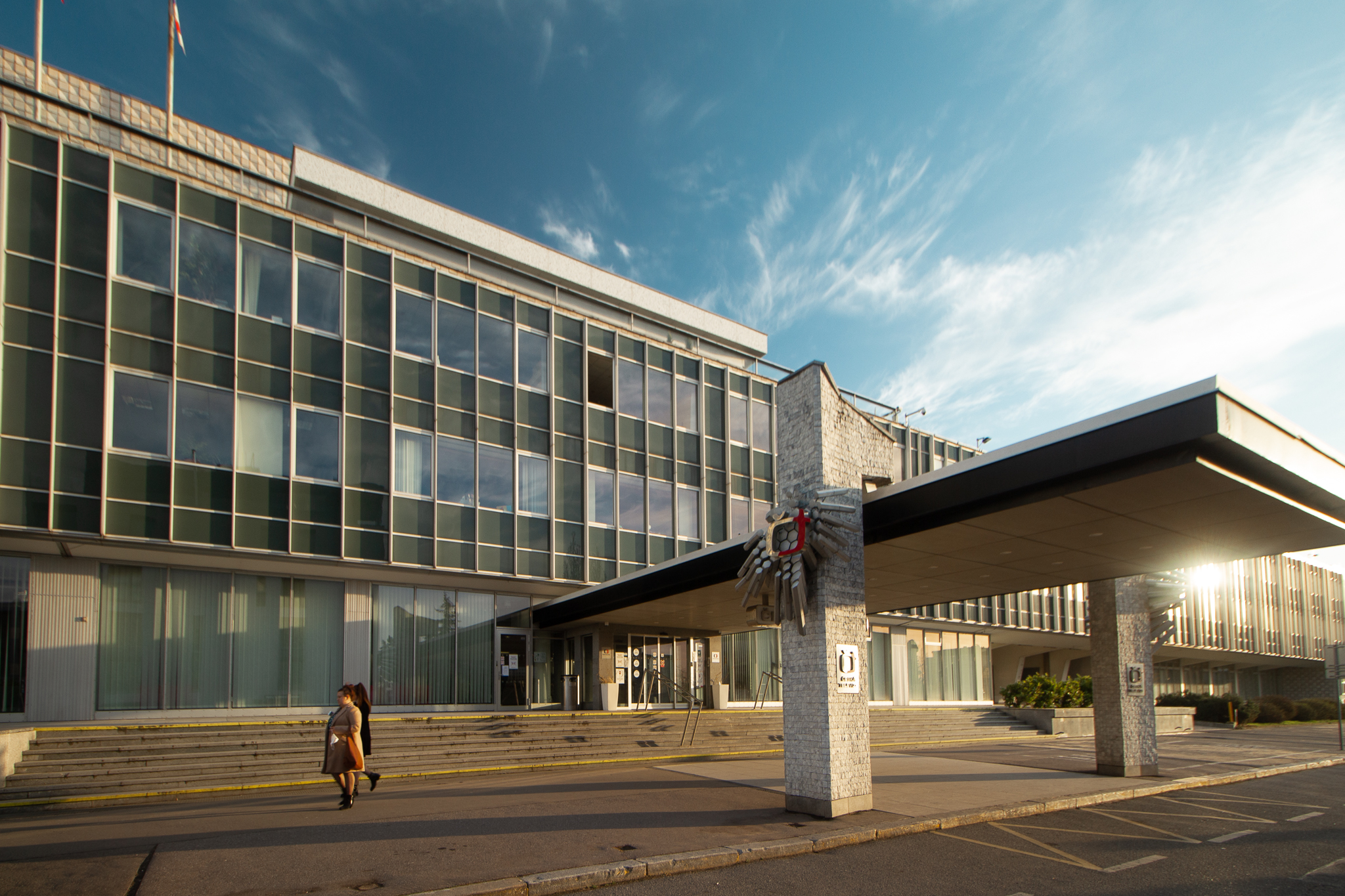
- Type: Public television
- Country: Czech Republic
- Availability: National
- Owner: Public
- Key people: Hynek Chudárek
- Launch date: 1 January 1993; 33 years ago
- Official website: Official website
- Replaced: Czechoslovak Television (Czech: Československá televize)

Czech Television (Czech: Česká televize [ˈtʃɛskaː ˈtɛlɛvɪzɛ]; abbreviation: ČT) is a public television broadcaster in the Czech Republic that currently broadcasts six channels. Established after the dissolution of Czechoslovakia in 1992, it succeeded Czechoslovak Television (CST or ČST) which was founded in 1953.

== History ==
=== 1953–1992: Czechoslovak Television ===
Founded on 1 May 1953, Czechoslovak Television (ČST) was the state television broadcaster of Czechoslovakia used as a state propaganda medium of the then socialist state. It was known by three names over its lifetime: Czech: Československá televize, Slovak: Československá televízia (until 1990), and Česko-slovenská televízia (from 1990 until 1992).

ČST originally consisted of a single channel and limited experimental broadcasting in 1953. Regular broadcasts began on 25 February 1954 and on 10 May 1970, a second channel was launched. The broadcast language of ČST was predominantly Czech in the first channel, Slovak for selected programming, and both for news. The second channel was split into two, broadcasting various "national" language programming in the two parts of the country.

The main headquarters of ČST was located in Prague, but it also had main studios in Bratislava, Košice, Ostrava and Brno.

The first public broadcast was a short performance by František Filipovský (1907–1993) on 1 May 1953. On 11 February 1955, the first live broadcast took place, which was an ice hockey match from Prague. Like all other media in communist Czechoslovakia, the station was subject to heavy censorship. However, as part of the process of social liberation in 1968, ČST aired broadcasts about the Prague Spring for a few days. However, in 1969, it became part of the normalization efforts of the national media.

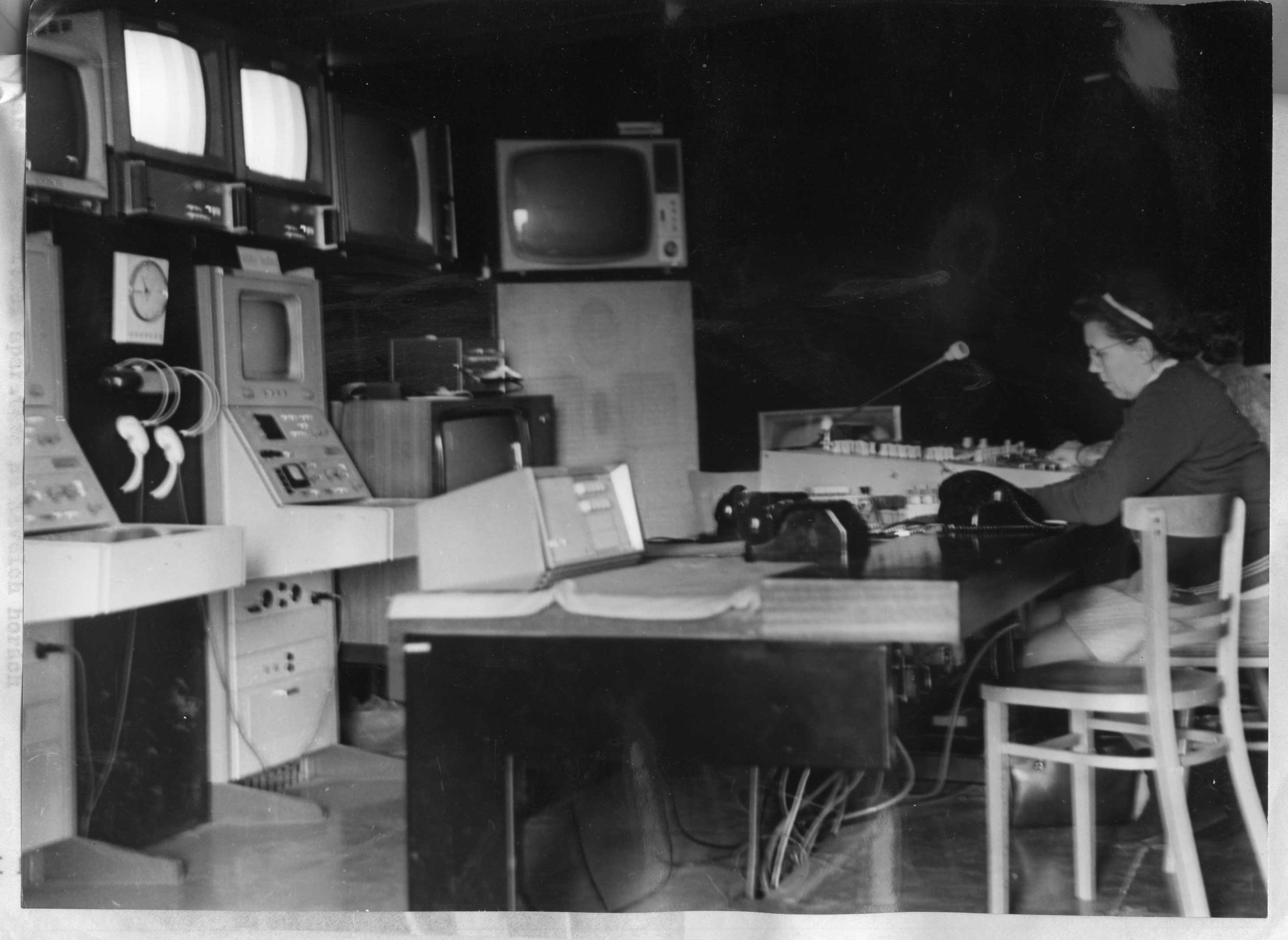
Color television broadcasting studio

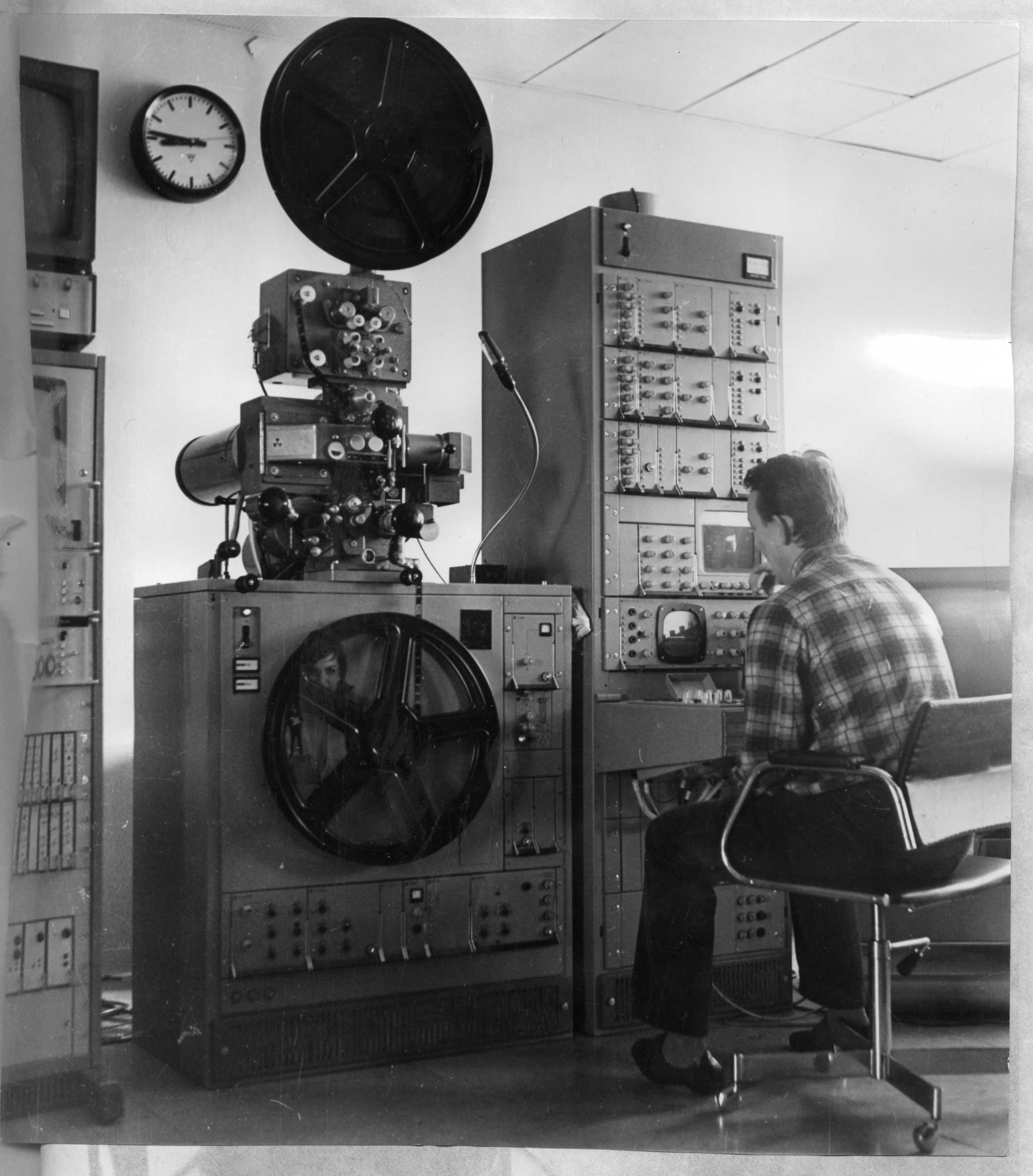
Color projection equipment (1971)

On 10 May 1970, Czechoslovak Television began broadcasting a second channel, ČST TV2. Further technical improvements were made on 9 May 1973, when the first regular broadcasts in colour started on TV2, followed two years later by colour transmission on the first channel as well.

At the end of the decade, in 1979, a building and a studio based in Prague's Kavčí hory were opened, which became the home of ČST's news department. In May 1988, a teletext service was introduced.

After November 1989, lineup changes were made, with the first channel renamed F1 for the federal district, and the second channel being split into the Czech ČTV and the Slovak S1, the first such division of channels by ČST. A third channel for Czech audiences, previously used by Soviet broadcasting, was launched on 14 May 1990, called OK3 (Czech: Otevřený kanál tři, lit. 'Open Channel three'). A replacement channel for Slovak audiences called TA3 was created on 6 June 1991 (broadcasting from August 1991 until July 1992).

During the Velvet Revolution, ČST staff very quickly joined the side of the protesters and allowed them to spread important messages and broadcasts of the demonstrations.

ČST ended its broadcasts with the dissolution of Czechoslovakia at the end of 1992, with two public television stations established in its place: Česká televize and Slovenská televízia, both successors of ČST. ČST disappeared along with Czechoslovakia on 31 December 1992.

=== Czech Television ===
Czech Television was established by the Czech Television Act of the Czech National Council (Act No. 483/1991 Coll.) on 1 January 1992, as a public television service for the citizens of the Czech Republic, with property transferred from Czechoslovak Television.

On 1 January 1993, a new concept of channels broadcast by Czech Television was introduced, which were renamed ČT1 (formerly ČTV), ČT2 (formerly F1), and ČT3 (formerly OK3). On 3 February 1994, Czech Television freed up one of the nationwide broadcast channels in accordance with the law; starting 4 February 1994, Czech Television was left with two channels, ČT1 and ČT2.

In 2005, the news channel ČT24 and the following year, ČT Sport were launched alongside new logos on 1 October. In 2013, the broadcaster added two new channels, ČT :D (children's) and ČT art (arts/culture). In April 2020, ČT3, targeting the older generation, was relaunched. It was subsequently discontinued on 1 January 2023.

As of 31 December 2019, Czech Television employed 3,005 people and was one of the largest employers in the film and arts sector in the Czech Republic.

== Channels ==
=== Current ===
ČT1 logo 2012

ČT24 logo

ČT Sport logo

ČT Déčko logo

ČT1 is a generalist channel, showing family-oriented television, Czech movies, series, news, entertainment and documentaries. ČT1 HD is the high-definition version of ČT1. Previously HD programming was shown on ČT HD, covering ČT1, ČT2 and ČT4.

ČT2 broadcasts documentaries, movies and nature-oriented shows such as documentary films by David Attenborough, and sport events. This channel also frequently shows foreign films in the original versions with Czech subtitles, including many English-language movies. ČT2 HD is the high-definition version of ČT2.

ČT24 is the Czech Republic's first and only 24-hour news channel, provides news and information around the clock with bulletins every hour. ČT24 is broadcast live over the Internet, as well as over the satellites Astra 3A, Astra 1KR and Intelsat 10–02. It is also carried on Czech cable-TV providers and digital terrestrial services.

ČT Sport (previously ČT4 Sport and ČT4) is a sports channel, it broadcasts live over the satellites Astra 3A, Astra 1KR and Intelsat 10–02. It is also carried on Czech cable-TV providers and digital terrestrial services. Broadcasts parts of major world, European, and Czech sports events (i.e. Olympic Games, World Cups or European Championships) are broadcast here. ČT Sport HD is the high-definition version of ČT Sport, which launched on 3 May 2012 and replaced ČT HD.

ČT Déčko is a children's channel designed for young viewers 4 to 12 years of age and was launched on 31 August 2013. ČT Déčko broadcasts from 06:00 to 20:00h, and shares its frequency with cultural channel ČT art which uses the remaining hours.

ČT art is an arts and culture channel launched on 31 August 2013. ČT art broadcasts from 20:00 to 06:00h, and shares its frequency with children's channel ČT Déčko which uses the remaining hours.

=== Former ===
ČT3 logo

ČT HD was the high-definition channel from ČT, broadcasting programs from ČT1, ČT2 and ČT Sport. On 1 March 2012, the channel was transformed into ČT1 HD, ČT2 HD, ČT sport HD. From 15 November also on satellite ČT24 HD, ČT art HD, ČT :D HD.

ČT3 broadcast programs, shows and old Czech and Slovak-produced movies. in response to the COVID-19 pandemic in order to help older generations cope with isolation. It was shut down on 1 January 2023.

== Station ==
=== Television studios ===
Within the framework of Czech Television, there are two television studios. Television studio Brno is based in the second-largest city in the Czech Republic and was founded in 1961. The second studio is based in Ostrava and was founded in 1955. In the year 2001, the Czech government stated that TV studios have to contribute to television production in the range of at least 20% share in national television broadcasting and at least 25 minutes of regional news coverage in their area of competence.

=== Charity ===
Czech Television is well known for its wide contributions to many charities. They are mainly raising money by broadcasting many beneficial programs. As an example, every year, Czech television broadcasts a beneficial evening of the well-known Czech charity organization "Centrum Paraple" where various artists perform their mostly musical performances. Centrum Paraple is an organization that focuses on helping people with physical handicaps.

=== Education ===
Czech Television is creating and broadcasting various educational and awareness-raising programs intended for various age and interest groups. Czech television also cooperates with various domestic high schools and universities. For example, this includes the provision of methodological worksheets, which are complementary to audiovisual demonstrations of television programs. Regarding universities, Czech television organizes the program ČT start which offers various workshops or even job opportunities for students who are in their final year.

=== European Broadcasting Union ===
Since 1993, Czech television has been a member of the European Broadcasting Union (EBU), which is the largest professional association of national broadcasters in the world and brings together over 70 active members from more than fifty countries in Europe, North Africa, and the Middle East and other associate members from around the world.

== Funding and criticism ==
Czech Television is funded through television concession fees which are paid by all households and legal entities that own a television or any form of television signal receiver. Concession fees are currently set at 135 Kč per month (around €5) since 2008. The total number of receivers has declined by 88 thousand from 2010 to 2020, thus reducing annual income by 143 mil. Kč.

Television fees are the main source of funding for Czech Television and are used primarily for production and broadcasting programs. They amount to more than 90% of television income according to the budget estimate on Y2020. Additional income is earned through advertising, where it is less successful than commercial television stations, because it is restricted by law and revenue from other business activities (product placement. selling rights to content, sponsoring, etc.).

In April 2026, Culture Minister Oto Klempíř unveiled details of a planned overhaul of public media funding which would abolish license fees in favour of state funding. The proposal has raised an outcry from the opposition parties, who see it as an attack on media independence. The right-wing populist government announced in the summer of 2026 its plan to finance broadcasting from the state budget starting in January 2027. On October 22, 2026 the coalition then introduced the bill to parliament at short notice and surprisingly to many observers, and had it voted on in an unusual night session, at 4:36 am on Saturday morning. Therefore, a demonstration spontaneously took place in front of parliament and protest took place in many cities in the Czech Republic.

Tens of thousands of people demonstrated against the plans of PM Babiš government to abolish public broadcasting and instead finance television and radio directly from the state budget. This would reduce the budget of public broadcasting by more than 15 percent. According to the plans, the media should be directly controlled by the government. On 3 November, Czech Television and Czech Radio staff held a one-day strike against a government plan to transfer public-service media funding to the state budget and reduce their financial support. Prime minister Andrej Babiš stated that he acknowledged the strike and demonstrations, but the coalition plans were not changed.

=== Fee collection system ===
Because of the decreasing amount of payers and real fee value, Czech Television has responded by making the most of the opportunities offered by legislation to identify both individuals and legal entities who are not paying the television fee. Czech legislation allows Czech Television to use databases of energy suppliers to identify all households which consume electricity and thus potentially could own a television. Persons or households detected by this system are considered feepayers unless they make a claim that they are not by sending an affidavit. In the event of revelation, the unregistered listener is obliged to pay, apart from the fees due, a surcharge of CZK 10,000 for an unreported television.

Addressing unregistered fee-payers is associated with the cost of sending letters and the higher need for call center operators, but Czech Television is able to collect additional tens of millions through this method.

=== Criticism ===
Questions have occasionally been raised about political influence on Czech Television and its ability to remain unbiased. Most criticism comes from left-wing and nationalist parties and groups. In 2018, Czech President Miloš Zeman unofficially proposed giving citizens who disagree with ČT the option to redirect the compulsory television licence fee toward charitable and social programmes. Citing perceived bias against Zeman and an anti-left editorial stance, several left-wing legislators — including Jaroslav Foldyna — pledged to vote against ČT's annual report until the broadcaster fully disclosed its financial dealings. In 2013, it was publicly revealed that Karel Burian, director of the Brno ČT branch, had earned nearly 2 million CZK (approximately US$80,000) in the first half of 2011 alone — more than most senior Czech politicians, including the Prime Minister and the President of the Czech Republic.

=== Advertising restrictions ===
Revenues from advertising broadcasting on ČT sport programs are used by Czech Television for the production and broadcasting of sports programs. Teleshopping is completely banned on Czech Television. These restrictions do not apply to product placement, when used in its own programmes.

=== Czech TV crisis ===
The Czech TV crisis occurred between late 2000 and early 2001 as a dispute over control of broadcasting at Czech Television. The conflict involved disrupted transmissions and allegations of censorship. During the crisis, reporters at Czech Television staged an industrial dispute, organizing a sit-in and occupying the newsroom after rejecting attempts by Jana Bobošíková to dismiss them.

The protesting journalists received support from several politicians, including then-president Václav Havel, as well as from public figures. When the journalists attempted to broadcast their news programs, transmissions were repeatedly interrupted by Jiří Hodač and Bobošíková. Broadcasts were replaced either by a screen stating that an 'unauthorized signal' had entered the transmitter and that programming would resume shortly, or by alternative news bulletins presented by Bobošíková and a team recruited to replace the dismissed staff.

The crisis ended in early 2001 after Hodač and Bobošíková left Czech Television. Their departures followed large public demonstrations and an emergency session of the Parliament of the Czech Republic convened in response to the dispute.

== Management ==
=== Controversies ===
Jan Souček, a former Director General of Czech Television, faced criticism during his tenure for remarks about the media and for disputes with employees of the broadcaster. and his attacks on employees of Czech Television. In response to criticism from the Czech Television Council over his management, Souček compared his situation to that of Milada Horáková, a statement he later described as inappropriate. In an interview on 5 September 2023, shortly before taking office as Director General, Souček discussed the financing of public service media and stated that he expected forthcoming proposals from the Ministry of Culture of the Czech Republic to address funding for public broadcasters. During his tenure he repeatedly called for an increase in public broadcasting fees. Souček was dismissed by the Czech Television Council on 6 May 2025.

Souček's predecessor, Petr Dvořák, was elected Director General of Czech Television by the Czech Television Council in September 2011 for a six-year term and was re-elected in 2017. His appointment attracted some criticism because of his previous membership in the Communist Party, similar to his predecessor Jiří Janeček. Before joining Czech Television, Dvořák had worked primarily in commercial broadcasting and had served for several years as chief executive of TV Nova, a commercial television station associated with the investment group PPF Group. The station was later acquired by the American telecommunications company AT&T through its media holdings.

=== Czech Television Council ===
The Czech Television Council is a supervisory authority of Czech Television. The ČT Council has fifteen members elected and removed by the Chamber of Deputies so that important regional, political, social and cultural currents of opinion are represented in it. The members of the Board are elected for a term of office of six years, with one-third of the members being elected every two years, and then they may be re-elected. The powers of the Czech Television Council are defined by the law of the Czech Television, and the important powers are:

- Appoint and dismiss the Director General and at his proposal, the Director of Television Studios of Czech Television
- Approve the budget and final account of Czech Television
- Oversees the fulfillment of the budget of Czech Television
- Approve long-term plans for program, technical and economic development
- Determine the salary of the general director

The Czech Television Council manages according to its own budget, the costs of the council's activities and the remuneration of its members, as well as the costs of the Supervisory Board's activities and the remuneration of its members are paid from a special expenditure item in the Czech Television budget.

== Gallery ==
Czech Television continued to use the corporate logo of Czechoslovak Television after 1992, thus the logo was used for 59 years from 1 May 1953 to 30 September 2012.

The Ident sequence of ČST (in Czech).

ČST Logo

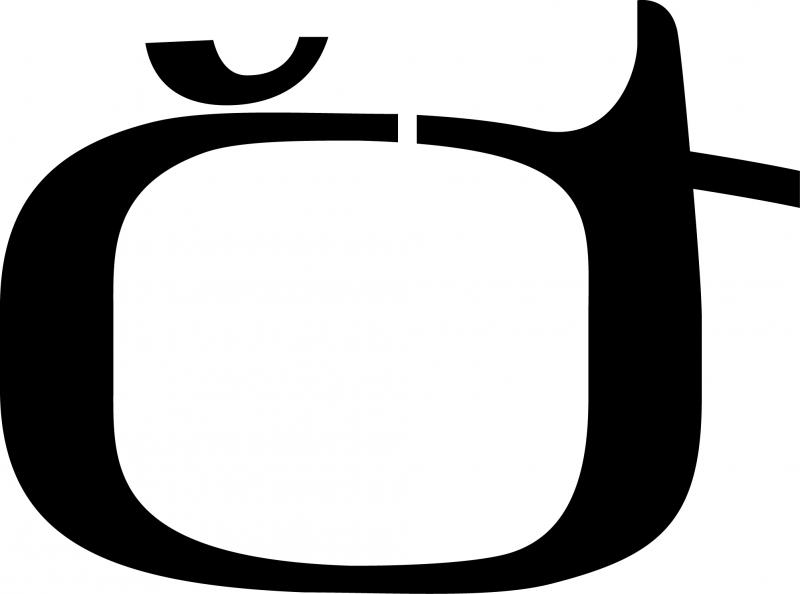
ČST's original logo from 1963 to 1969

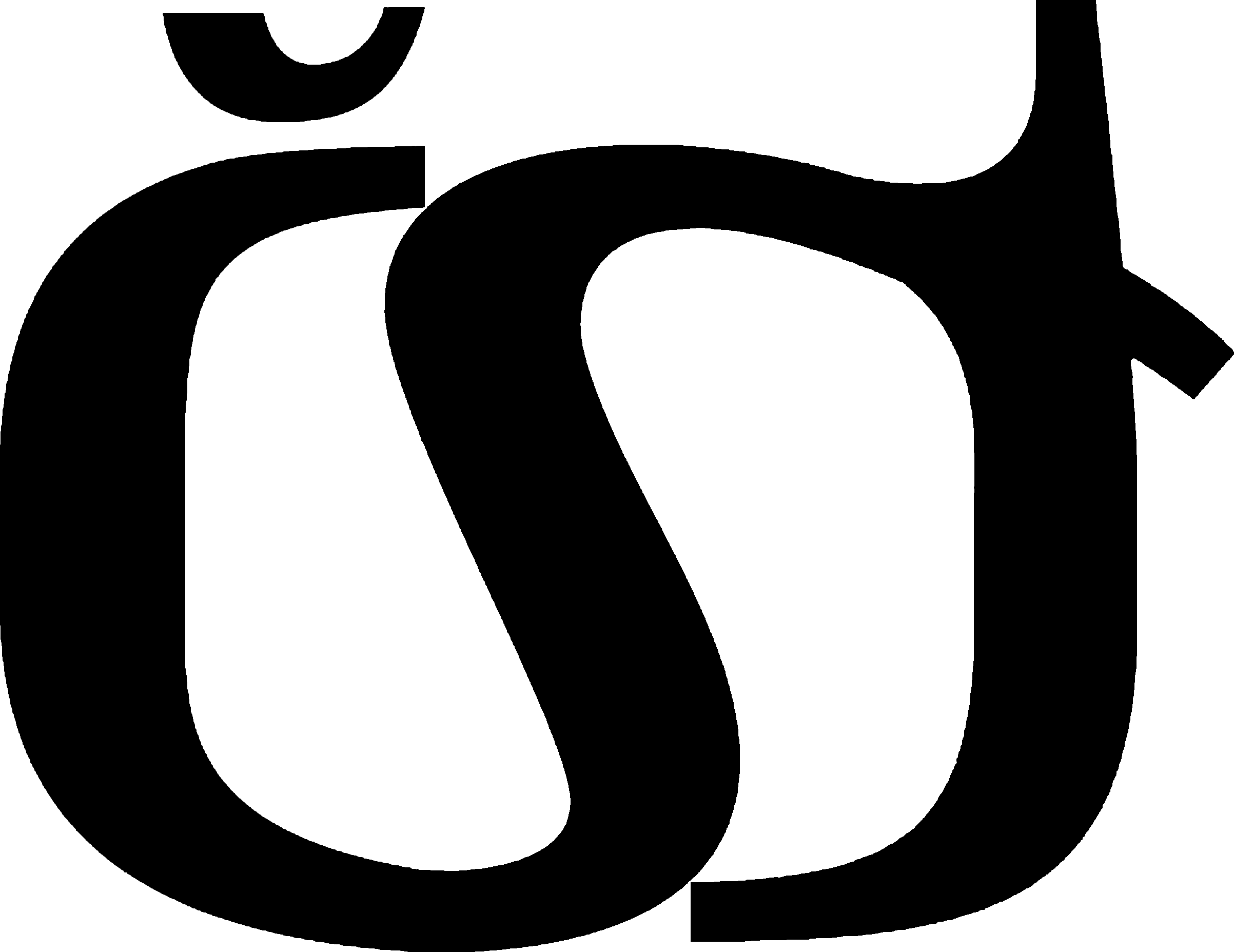
ČST's second logo from 1969 to 1975

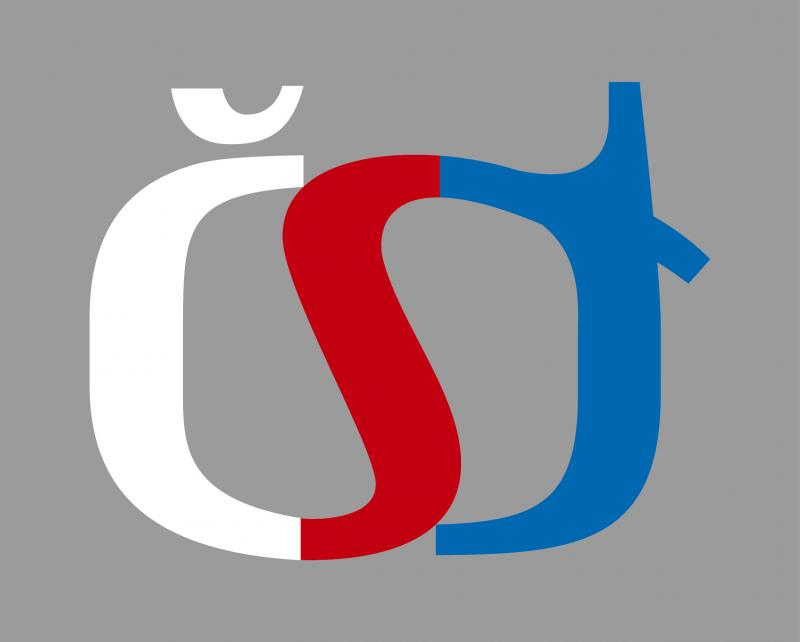
Color logo of ČST from 1969 to 1993

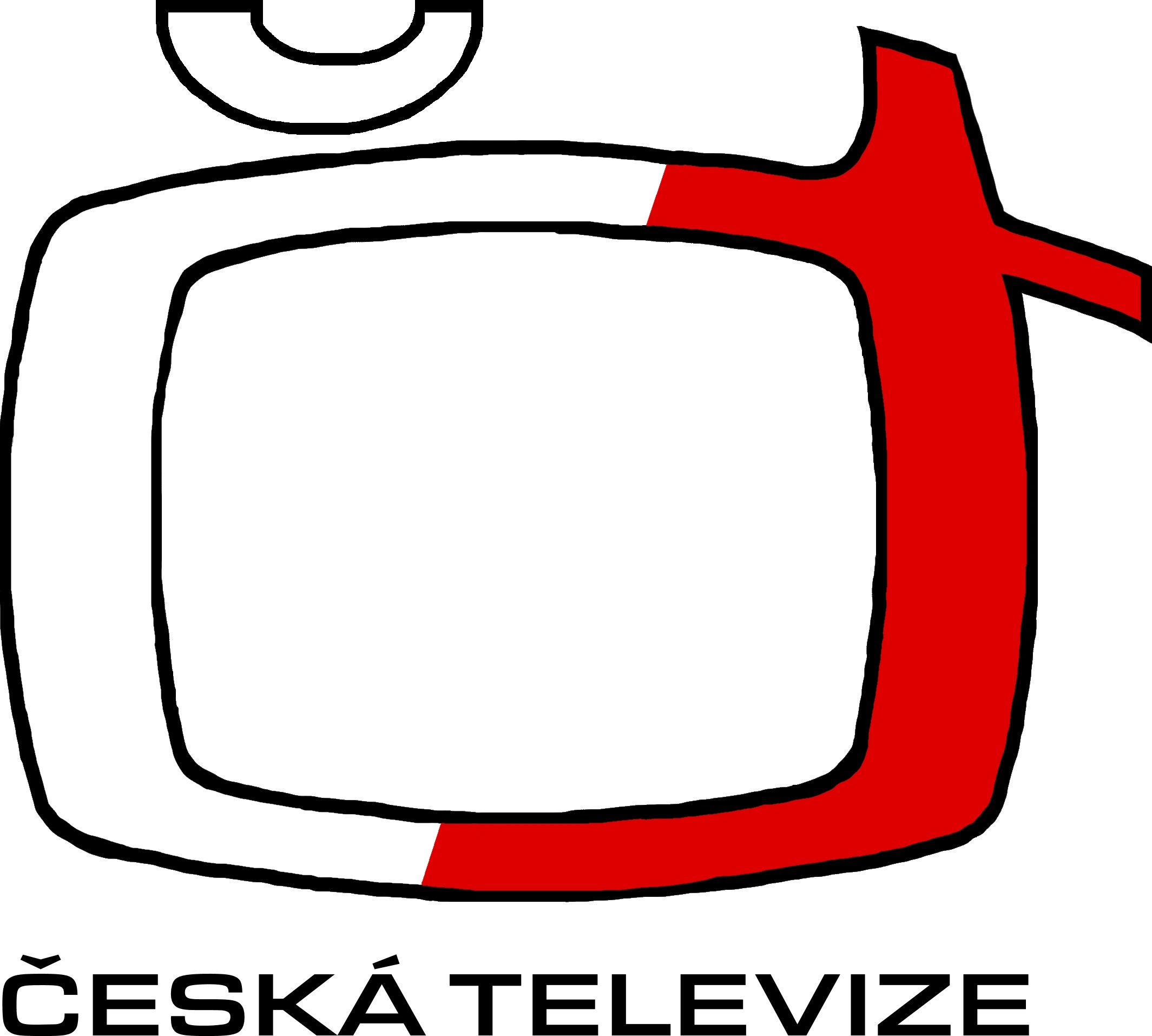
Logo in 1993

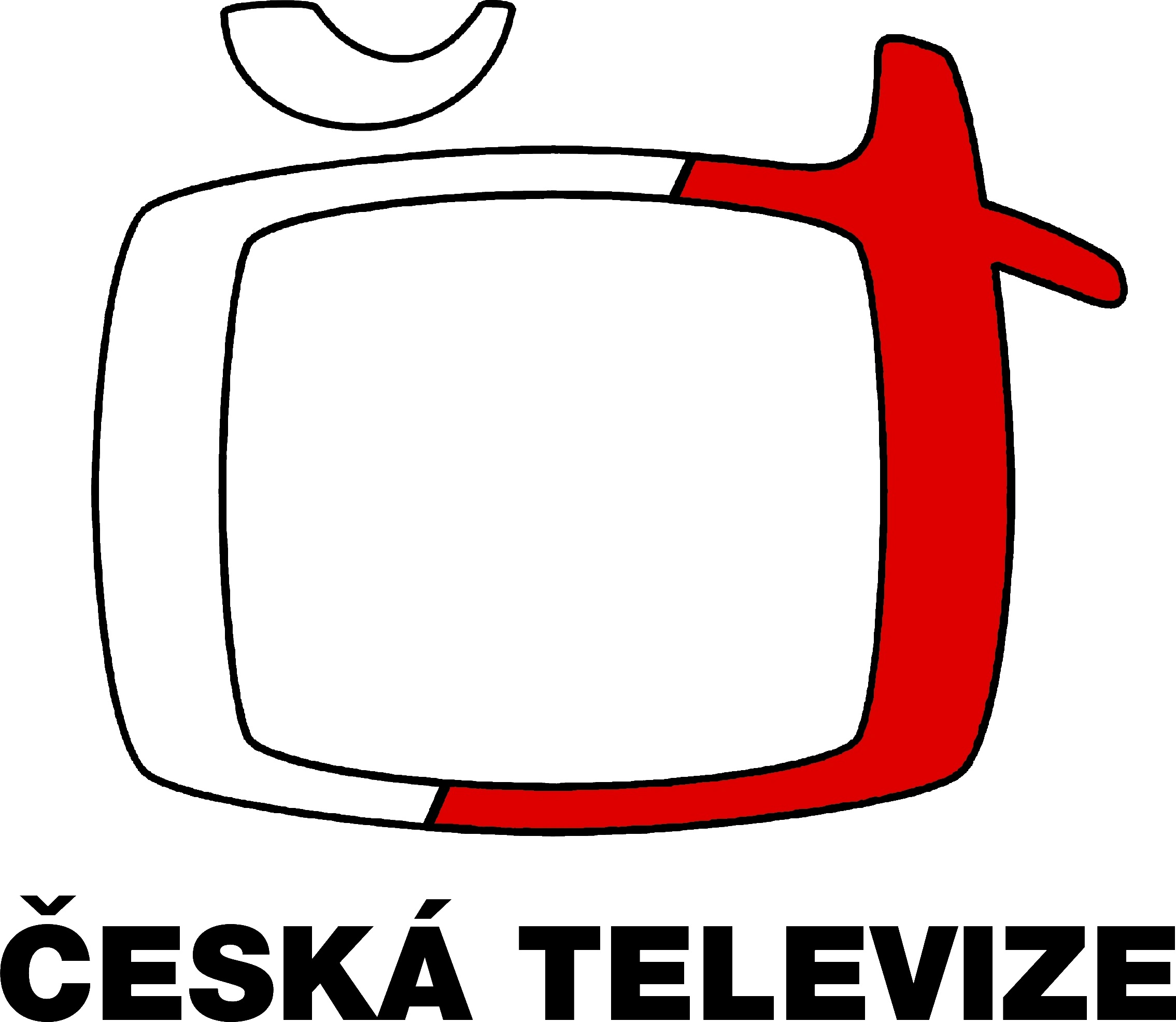
Logo in 1997

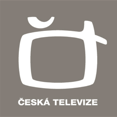
Logo in 2011

The current logo, used since 2012.

== See also ==
- Czech Radio, national radio broadcaster
- Mass media in Communist Czechoslovakia
