= ČT1 =

Czech television channel

- Logo used since 2012
- Country: Czech Republic
- Broadcast area: Czech Republic, reaching bordering regions via overspill of the Czech terrestrial network

Programming
- Language: Czech
- Picture format: 1080i HDTV (downscaled to 16:9 576i for the SDTV feed)

Ownership
- Owner: Czech Television
- Sister channels: ČT2; ČT24; ČT Sport; ČT :D; ČT art

History
- Launched: 1 May 1953; 73 years ago
- Former names: ČST (1953–1970); ČST1 (1970–1990); F1 (1990–1993)

Links
- Website: Official website

Availability

Terrestrial
- DVB-T/T2: MUX 21 (FTA) (HD)

Streaming media
- iVysílání: Watch live (Czech only)

ČT1 (ČT Jedna, Česká televize 1, "Jednička") is a Czech public television channel operated by Czech Television. ČT1 is a general-purpose channel, broadcasting family-oriented television, Czech films, news, and documentaries.

== History ==
The channel was launched by Czechoslovak Radio on 1 April 1953; control of which was handed over to Czechoslovak Television in 1957. At the time, all of its programming was conducted on the same national transmitter network, covering the entirety of Czechoslovakia. In April 1969, the Federal Minister of Posts and Telecommunications suggested a second channel, which started broadcasting on 10 April 1970. The existing channel, becoming the First Programme (I. program) was conceived as a mainstream network. This channel started colour broadcasts on 9 April 1975, two years after the second channel. The channel's coverage at the time was of 94,5 % of Czechoslovakia, slightly increasing to 95% in 1980.

After the Velvet Revolution, the original I. program was replaced by F1 on 2 September 1990.

On 1 January 1993, F1 changed its name to ČT1 in Czech Republic and STV1 in Slovak Republic. The channel subsequently became the first channel of the new Czech Television, created one year earlier following the Velvet Revolution. Since September 1997, the station has been broadcasting 24 hours a day.

Analogue broadcasting of ČT1 ended on 30 November 2011. The broadcasting of multiplex 1 (DVB-T standard) was announced in November 2019 and ended on 30 September 2020.

Until February 2013, ČT1 HD broadcasts could also be received via Multiplex 4 of Digital Broadcasting s.r.o. However, this test broadcast was terminated.

== Series ==
- Agatha Christie's Poirot
- Commissaire Moulin
- Knight Rider
- Mayday
- Step by Step
- The Simpsons
- Tom and Jerry
- Un passo dal cielo

== Logos and identities ==
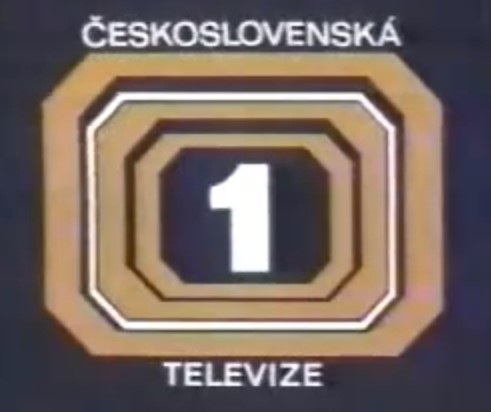
Logo of ČST1 from 1980 to 3 September 1990

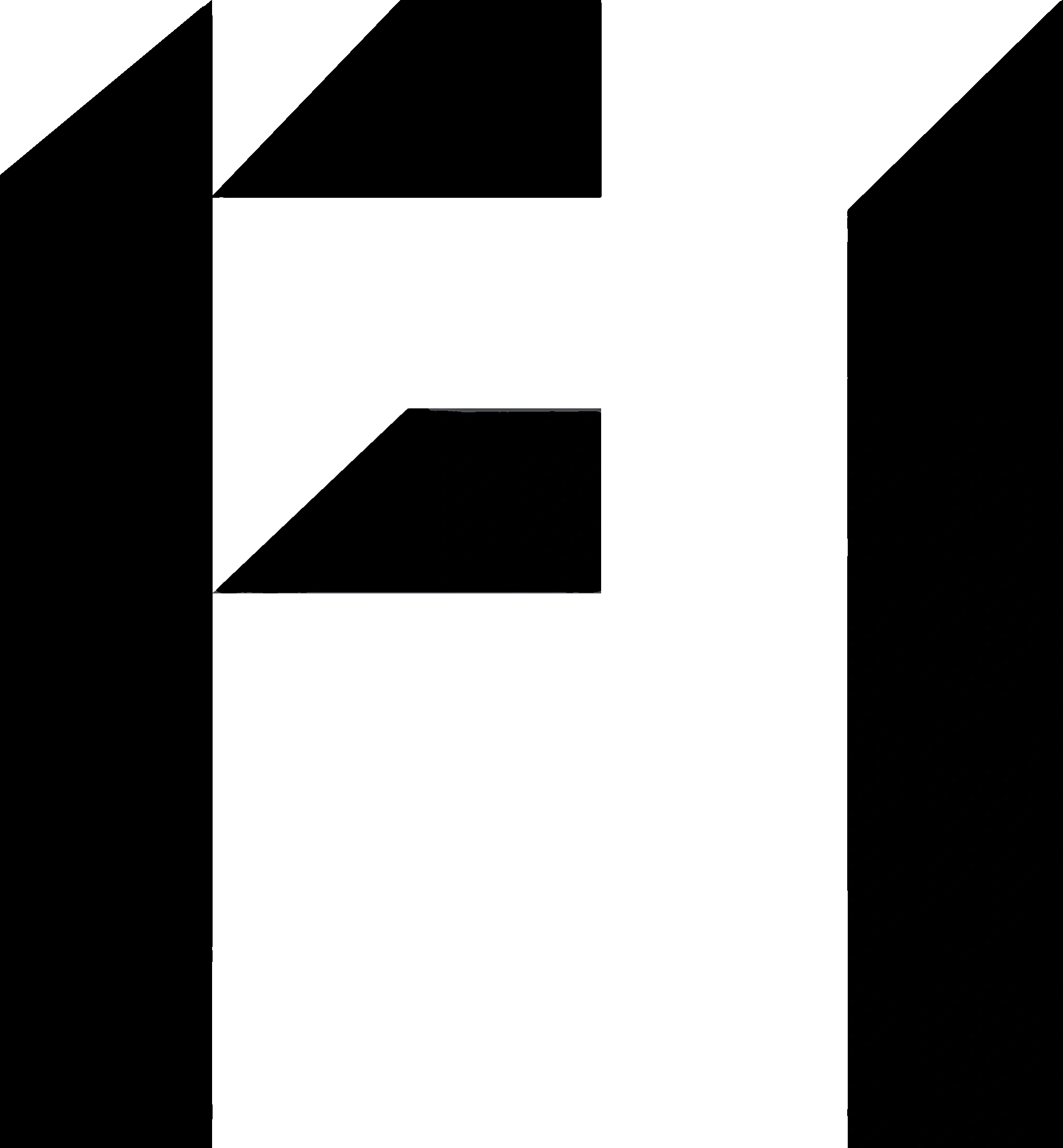
F1 logo used from 4 September 1990 to 31 December 1992

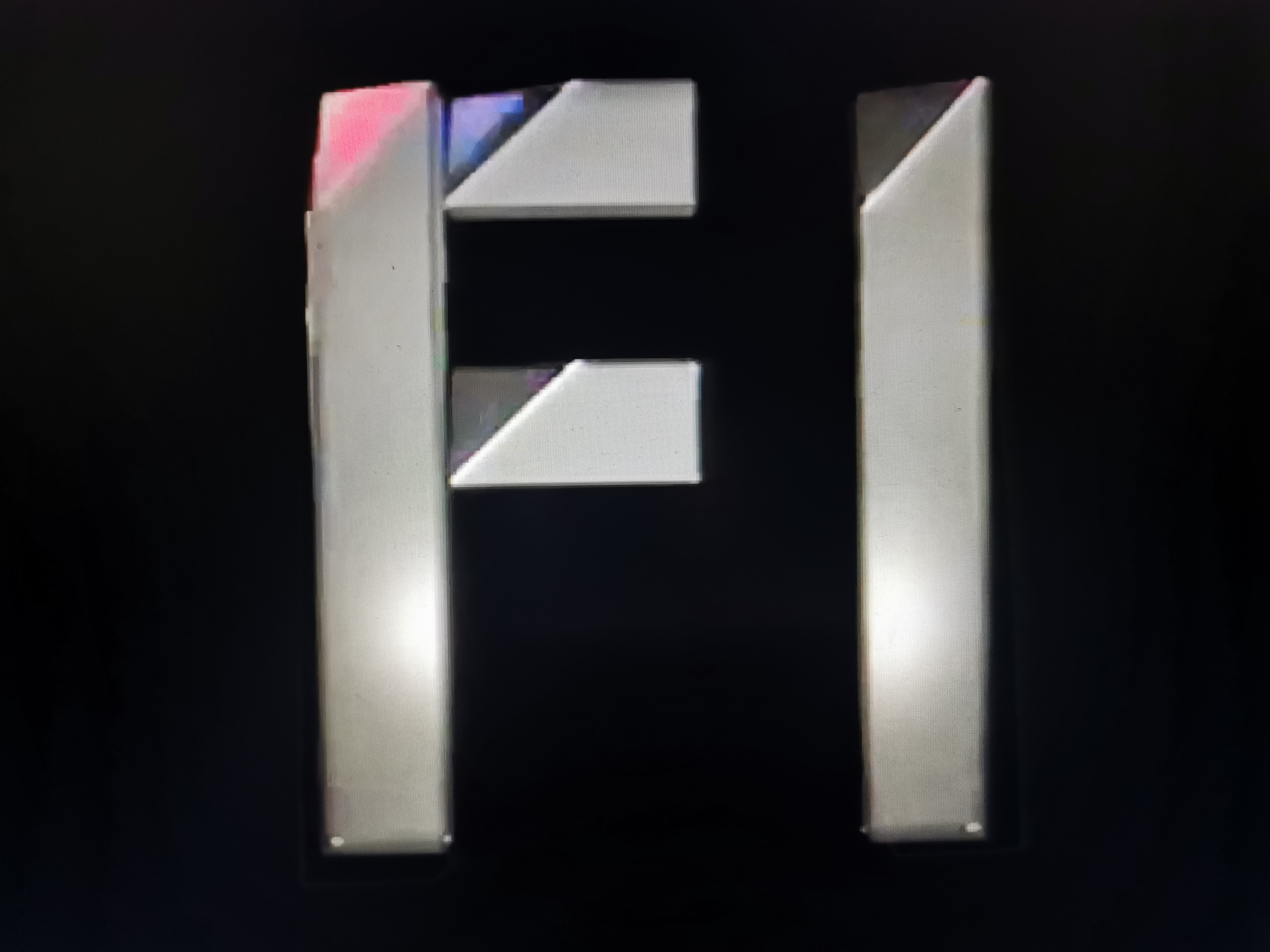
Screenshot of F1 logo in colour

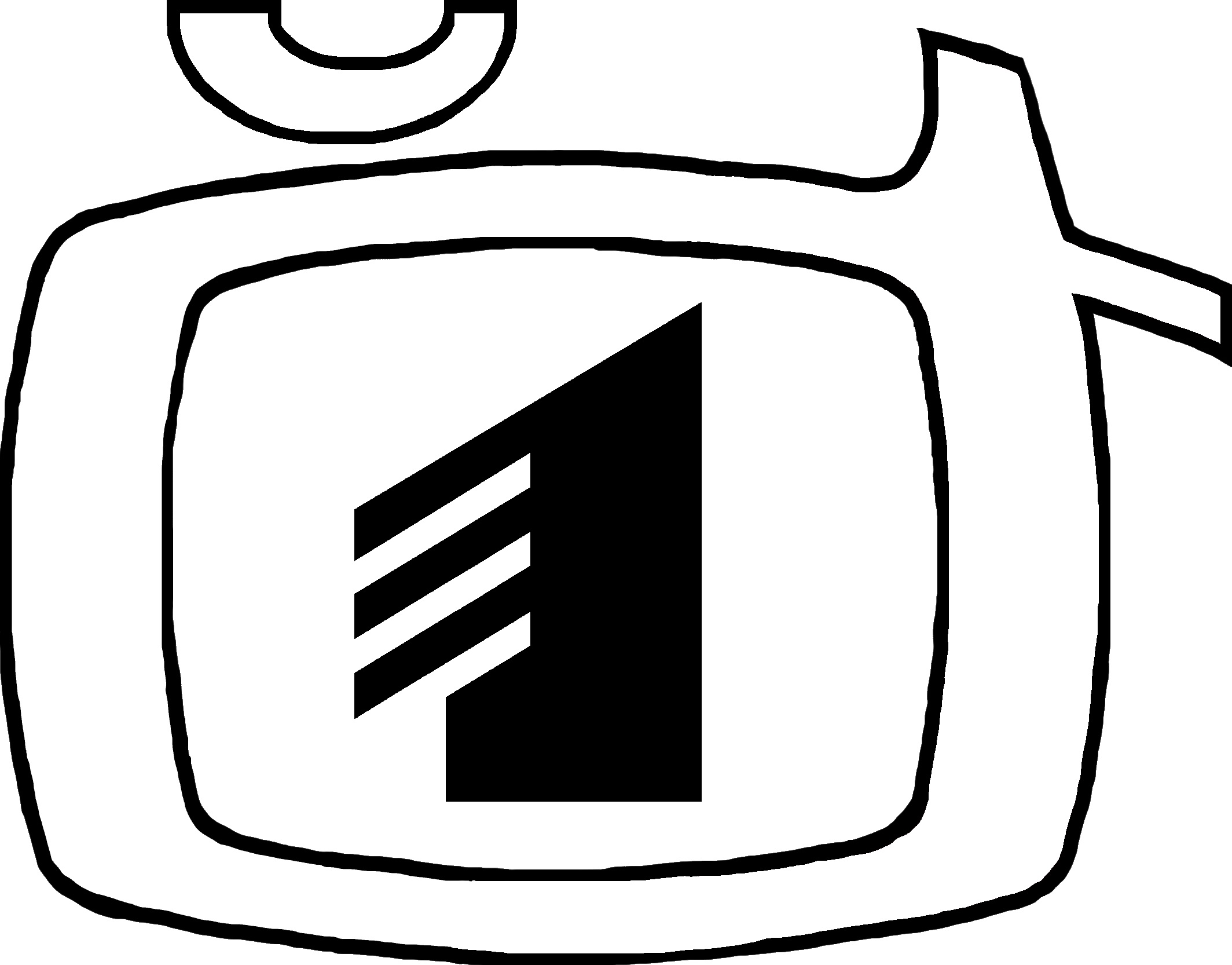
First logo used from 1 January 1993 to 2 September 1994

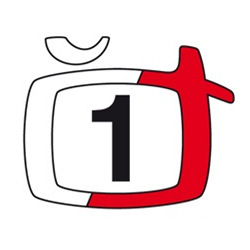
ČT1 logo used from 3 September 1994 to 31 August 2007

ČT1 logo used from 1 September 2007 to 1 October 2012

== See also ==
- Television in the Czech Republic
- ČT2
- ČT HD
- Telecommunications in the Czech Republic
