= Television in Slovakia =

Television stations in Slovakia broadcast in both DVB-T format (MUX-2 and MUX-3) and DVB-T2 format (MUX-1 and MUX-4). Broadcasting is mostly in the Slovak, state-owned channels have some dedicated broadcasting for ethnic minorities (always subtitled). Foreign language (with the exception of Czech) movies and shows are dubbed (rarely subtitled). Czech production is often broadcast in original, with the exception of juvenile programs. Sometimes, foreign language movies are broadcast with Czech dubbing. Czech television channels are also popular in Slovakia, received in paid DVB-T2 service (only ČT1, ČT2, Nova International, Prima SK and Prima Cool SK), directly in border regions (all channels) or carried by cable companies and satellite operators (almost all channels). Most of premium channels like Filmbox+, HBO, Viasat Channels, etc. broadcast only in Czech. Discovery, Sport 1, Sport 2 and few others are exception, they broadcast in both Czech and Slovak.

== Primarily terrestrial broadcasting ==
=== Public (state owned) channels ===
| Network | Website | Launched | Notes |
|---|---|---|---|
| Jednotka; Dvojka; Šport – sport channel 24 – news channel | website | 1956; 1970; 2021; 2022 | owned by Slovak Television and Radio (STVR) all channels available in HD |

=== Main Slovak commercial channels ===
| Network | Website | Launched | Notes |
|---|---|---|---|
| Markíza; Markíza Doma – dedicated to women Markíza Dajto – dedicated to men Markíza Krimi – crime-themed channel Markíza Klasik – classic films and TV series | website website website website website | 1996; 2009; 2012; 2022; 2024 | owned by Markíza Slovakia (PPF Group) all channels available in HD |
| TV JOJ; JOJ PLUS – dedicated to younger men JOJ Krimi – crime-themed channel JOJ Cinema – film channel Jojko – dedicated to children JOJ Šport – sport channel JOJ 24 – news channel JOJ Svet – documentary channel JOJ Šport 2 – sport channel | website | 2002; 2008; 2013; 2015; 2020; 2021; 2022; 2023; 2025 | owned by JOJ Group (J&T) all channels available in HD |

=== Other Slovak commercial channels ===
| Network | Website | Launched | Notes |
|---|---|---|---|
| TA3 | website | 2001 | news channel |
| Duck TV | website | 2007 | dedicated to smallest children |
| TV LUX | website | 2008 | Christian channel |
| TV OSEM | website | 2010 | dedicated to astrology |
| Senzi TV | website | 2013 | dedicated to folk music |
| TV RiK | website | 2015 | dedicated to children |
| Kanal1 | website | 2023 | documentary channel |
| Kanal1 Sport; Kanal1 Xtra | website | 2026 | sport channels |
| LifeTv | website | 2016 | Christian channel |
| Park TV | website | 2017 | documentary channel |
| Folklorika | website | 2018 | dedicated to folk music |
| TV Romana | | 2019 | dedicated to Romani people |
| Premier Sport 1 Premier Sport 2 Premier Sport 3 | website | 2019; 2021; 2024 | sport channels |
| Lala TV | | 2019 | dedicated to smallest children |
| HaHa TV | | 2020 | comedy-themed channel |
| Strike TV | | 2022 | comedy-themed channel |
| Skvelé TV | | 2022 | documentary channel |
| Turbo TV | website | 2022 | dedicated to children |
| TV Doktor | website | 2023 | dedicated to health and medicine |

=== Czech channels with broadcasting rights in Slovakia ===
| Network | Website | Launched | Notes | Owner |
|---|---|---|---|---|
| Nova International; Nova Sport 1 Nova Sport 2 Nova Sport 3 Nova Sport 4 Nova Sport 5 Nova Sport 6 | website | 2016; 2008; 2015; 2021; 2021; 2024; 2024 | Czech TV Nova’s channels in Slovakia | Nova Group (PPF Group) |
| Prima SK; CNN Prima News; Prima Cool SK; Prima Love SK; Prima Krimi SK | website website website website website | 2017; 2020; 2024; 2024; 2025 | Czech TV Prima’s channels in Slovakia | Prima Group (FTV Prima Group) |

== Regional terrestrial and cable channels ==
| Network | Region | Website |
|---|---|---|
| TV Bratislava | Bratislava | website |
| Televízia Ružinov | Bratislava | website |
| Dúbravská televízia | Bratislava | website |
| Devínskonovoveská televízia | Bratislava | website |
| Západoslovenská televízia | Bratislava | website |
| Televízia Pezinok | Pezinok | website |
| Mestská televízia Trnava | Trnava | website |
| TV Vita | Trnava | website |
| Bánovské televízne vysielanie | Bánovce nad Bebravou | website |
| Humenská televízia | Humenné | website |
| Televízia mesta Dolný Kubín | Dolný Kubín | website |
| Televízia Trenčianske Teplice | Trenčianske Teplice | website |
| Obecné televízne vysielanie Štrba | Štrba | website |
| Regionálna televízia Prievidza | Prievidza | website |
| TV Sen | Senica | website |
| Televízia Turiec | Martin | website |
| TV Raj | Žilina | website |
| TV Reduta | Spišská Nová Ves | website |
| TV Panoráma | Žarnovica | website |
| Televízia Močenok | Močenok | website |
| TV Poprad | Poprad | website |
| Hlohovská televízia | Hlohovec | website |
| TV Žiar | Žiar nad Hronom | website |
| Televízia Zemplín | Zemplín | website |
| Televízia Mistral | Michalovce | website |
| Bardejovská televízia | Bardejov | website |
| Televízia CENTRAL | Nitra | website |
| TV Považie | Považská Bystrica | website |
| Česko-Slovenská regionálna televízia | Holíč | website |
| Levická televízia | Levice | website |
| Ľubovnianska televízia | Stará Ľubovňa | website |
| TV Pohoda | Nové Mesto nad Váhom | website |
| Malacká televízia | Malacky | website |
| i-TV | Považská Bystrica | website |
| TV Liptov | Liptov | website |
| VIO TV | Banská Štiavnica | website |
| RTV KREA | Galanta | website |
| TV Piešťany | Piešťany | website |
| Mestská televízia Ružomberok | Ružomberok | website |
| Kežmarská televízia | Kežmarok | website |
| Mestská televízia Partizánske | Partizánske | website |
| Turzovská televízia | Turzovka | website |
| TV ORAVIA | Námestovo | website |
| Vaša TV | Čadca | website |
| TV Nitrička | Nitra | website |
| TV Levoča | Levoča | website |
| Televízia Hronka | Banská Bystrica | website |
| TV Region | Košice | website |
| TV VEGA | Košice | website |
| TV7 Prešov | Prešov | website |
| Televízia Šurany | Šurany | |
| TV Severka | Žilina | website |
| TV Komárno | Komárno | website |
| TV9 | Nitra | website |

== Cable & satellite television channels ==
=== Film ===
| Network | Website | Notes |
|---|---|---|
| HBO; HBO 2 HBO 3 Cinemax; Cinemax 2 | website | owned by Skydance Corporation |
| AMC; Film+ | website website | owned by AMC Networks International |
| FilmBox+ One; FilmBox+ Comedy; FilmBox+ Emotion; FilmBox+ Festival; FilmBox+ Hits; FilmBox+ Love&Crime | website | owned by SPI International |
| Film Europe; Film Europe+ | website | owned by Film Europe |
| CS Film / CS Horor | website | owned by Československá filmová společnost |
| Canal+ Action | | |

=== Entertainment ===
| Network | Website | Notes |
|---|---|---|
| AXN; AXN Black; AXN White | website | owned by Sony Pictures Television |
| Viasat Epic Drama | website | owned by Viasat World |
| E! | website | owned by Versant |
| FashionBox | website | owned by SPI International |
| Fashion TV Czech&Slovak | website | owned by TV FASHION |
| Hobby TV; Mňam TV; Mňau TV | website website website | owned by S&P Sales House |

=== Kids and teens ===
| Network | Website | Notes |
|---|---|---|
| Cartoonito; Cartoon Network; Nickelodeon; Nicktoons; Nick Jr. | website website website website website | owned by Skydance Corporation |
| Disney Channel; Disney Junior; Baby TV | website website | owned by The Walt Disney Company |
| Jim Jam; Minimax TV | website website | owned by AMC Networks International |

=== Documentary ===
| Network | Website | Notes |
|---|---|---|
| Animal Planet; Discovery Channel; HGTV; Investigation Discovery; Travel Channel; Food Network; TLC | website | owned by Skydance Corporation |
| National Geographic; National Geographic Wild | website | owned by The Walt Disney Company; National Geographic Society |
| Crime & Investigation; History Channel | website | owned by The Walt Disney Company; Hearst Communications; A&E Networks |
| Spektrum; Spektrum Home; TV Paprika | website website website | owned by AMC Networks International |
| Viasat Explorer; Viasat History; Viasat Nature; Viasat True Crime | website website website website | owned by Viasat World |
| CS History; CS Mystery | website website | owned by Československá filmová společnost |
| BBC Earth | website | owned by BBC Studios |
| Docubox | website | owned by SPI International |
| Fishing & Hunting | website | |
| Love Nature | website | |
| Nautical Channel | website | |
| Travel xp | website | |
| Wild TV | | |

=== International News ===
| Network | Website | Notes |
|---|---|---|
| Al Jazeera English | website | |
| Arirang TV | website | |
| BBC News | website | |
| Bloomberg Television | website | |
| CGTN Europe | | |
| CNBC | website | owned by Versant |
| CNN International | website | owned by Skydance Corporation |
| DW | website | |
| Euronews | website | |
| France 24 | website | |
| NHK World-Japan | website | |
| Sky News | website | |
| TRT World | website | |

=== Sport ===
| Network | Website | Notes |
|---|---|---|
| Auto, Motor und Sport | website | version for Czech Republic and Slovakia |
| Canal+ Sport; Canal+ Sport 2 | website | owned by Vivendi version for Czech Republic and Slovakia |
| Eurosport; Eurosport 2 | website | owned by Skydance Corporation version for Czech Republic and Slovakia |
| Fast&FunBox; FightBox | website website | owned by SPI International |
| Golf Channel | website | owned by Versant version for Czech Republic and Slovakia |
| Sport 1 Sport 2 Extreme Sports Channel | website website | owned by AMC Networks International |

=== Music ===
| Network | Website | Notes |
|---|---|---|
| MTV Global | website | owned by Skydance Corporation |
| Stingray Djazz; Stingray Classica; Stingray CMusic; Stingray iConcerts | website website website website | owned by Stingray Group |
| Óčko; Óčko Black; Óčko Expres; Óčko Star | website | owned by Agrofert |
| Šlágr Originál; Šlágr Muzika; Šlágr Premium | website | owned by Šlágr TV |
| 360 TuneBox | website | owned by SPI International |
| Retro Music Television | website | |
| Rebel | website | |
| Mezzo | website | |
| Deluxe Music | website | |

== Defunct Slovak channels ==
| Network | | Period of broadcasting | Notes |
|---|---|---|---|
| ČST Bratislava 1 | | 1956-1990 | generalist channel |
| ČST Bratislava 2 | | 1970-1990 | generalist channel |
| F1 | | 1990-1992 | generalist channel |
| S1 | | 1990-1991 | generalist channel |
| TA3 | | 1991-1992 | generalist channel |
| TV Sever | | 1993-2000 | regional channel |
| Danubius Cable TV | | 1995 | generalist channel |
| VTV | | 1995-2000 | generalist channel |
| TV Luna | | 1999-2001 | generalist channel |
| Music Box | | 2002-2013 | music channel |
| TVA | | 2003-2012 | advertising channel |
| Moooby TV | | 2004-2010 | quiz channel |
| TV Nautik | | 2005-2008 | quiz channel replaced by Televízo |
| TV Patriot | | 2006-2012 | news from regions |
| Musiq1 | | 2008-2015 | music channel |
| STV3 (Slovakia TV3) | slovakiatv3.svg | 2008-2011 | sport channel part of RTVS relaunched in 2019 as Trojka |
| Televízo | | 2008-2009 | quiz channel replaced by TV Živa |
| TV Živa | | 2009-2011 | quiz channel |
| Digi Sport; Digi Sport 2 Digi Sport 3 Digi Sport 4 Digi Sport 5 Digi Sport 6 | | 2010-2021 | sport channels |
| Slovak Sport.TV1; Slovak Sport.TV2; Slovak Sport.TV3 | | 2012-2015 | sport channels replaced by Arena Sport |
| TV Fooor | | 2013 | comedy-themed channel |
| IN TV | | 2015 | generalist channel |
| TV 213 | | 2016-2018 | sport channel |
| Orange Šport; Orange Šport 2 Orange Šport 3 Orange Šport 4 | | 2018-2021 | sport channels |
| Comedy House | | 2019-2022 | comedy-themed channel replaced by Strike TV |
| Trojka | | 2019-2022 | dedicated to archived content part of RTVS |
| Chuck TV | | 2021-2022 | dedicated to electronic sports |
| Premier Sport 4 | | 2023-2024 | sport channel |
| ŤUKI TV | | 2015-2025 | dedicated to children |

== Most viewed channels ==
| Position | Channel | Share of total viewing (%) |
|---|---|---|
| 1 | TV Markíza | 18.1 |
| 2 | TV JOJ | 12.0 |
| 3 | Jednotka | 5.9 |
| 4 | JOJ Plus | 5.0 |
| 5 | Markíza Doma | 4.5 |
| 6 | JOJ Krimi | 2.0 |
| 7 | TA3 | 1.6 |
| 8 | Dvojka | 1.4 |
| 9 | Trojka | 1.2 |
| 10 | Markíza Dajto | 1.0 |

=== Market share ===
| TV Group | Whole-day share, 12+ (January-June 2023) | Whole-day share, 12-54 (January-June 2023) |
|---|---|---|
| Markíza Group | 24.27% | 28,78% |
| JOJ Group | 20.12% | 20.65% |
| Radio and Television of Slovakia | 15.80% | 11.98% |
| TA3 | 2.08% | 1.30% |
| Czech television channels | 11.95% | 8.97% |
| Hungarian television channels | 4.35% | 3.85% |

== See also ==
- List of radio stations in Slovakia
- List of Czech-language television channels
- Television licence
