= List of radio stations in Slovakia =

== National radio stations ==
Broadcaster is Slovenská televízia a rozhlas, owned by Government of Slovakia.

Radio	Name	Website	Format	FM (RDS)	DAB+	DVB-T2	Satellite	Internet
SRo 1	Rádio Slovensko	website	pop music (Modern AC)	Yes (_SRO_1__)	Yes	Yes	Yes	Yes
SRo 2	Rádio Regina (in Západ, Stred, Východ)	website	regional and minority programmes with oldies, schlager and folk music 3 regional variants	Yes (REGINA_Z, REGINA_S, REGINA_V)	Yes	Yes	Yes	Yes
SRo 3	Rádio Devín	website	classical music, jazz, concerts, radio dramas, literature, art	Yes (DEVIN___)	Yes	Yes	Yes	Yes
SRo 4	Rádio FM	website	young oriented, alternative / electronic music	Yes (RADIO_FM)	Yes	Yes	Yes	Yes
SRo 5	Rádio Patria (Note: Rádio Patria in some regions of Slovakia shares frequency with Rádio Devín, Rádio_FM or Radio Slovakia International.)	website	programmes in Hungarian language with mostly Hungarian pop / rock / folk music broadcasting time: 06:00 - 18:00	Yes* (PATRIA__) (06:00 - 18:00)	Yes	Yes	Yes	Yes
SRo 6	Radio Slovakia International	website	external service in foreign languages	Yes (R_S_I__) (18:00 - 06:00)	Yes	Yes	Yes	Yes
SRo 8	Rádio Litera	website	literature, radio soap operas		Yes	Yes	Yes	Yes
SRo 9	Rádio Junior	website	for children, fairy tales		Yes	Yes	Yes	Yes

== Multiregional commercial radio stations ==
Name	Website	Format	RDS	Owner
Rádio Expres	website	pop music, info (Hot AC)	EXPRES__	Bauer Media Group
Rádio Melody	website	pop music (Soft AC)	_MELODY_	Bauer Media Group
Europa 2	website	pop music, dance music (CHR)	EUROPA_2	Bauer Media Group
Rádio ROCK	website	rock music	__ROCK__	Bauer Media Group
Fun Rádio	website	pop music (Hot AC)	FUNRADIO	Radio Group
Rádio Vlna	website	pop music, oldies (AC)	__VLNA__	Radio Group
Dobré rádio	website	pop music, dance music (CHR)	*DOBRE*	Dobré médiá
Rádio Best FM	website	oldies	BEST_FM_	Best FM Media

== Multiregional christian radio stations ==
Name	Website	Format	RDS
Rádio 7	website	Christian (CR) protestant	RADIO7__
Rádio Lumen	website	Christian (CR) catholic	_LUMEN__
Rádio Mária Slovensko	website	Christian (CR) catholic	R_Maria

== Regional radio stations ==
Name	Website	Format	Broadcast area	RDS
Rádio Beta	website	pop music, regional info	TN, BB	__BETA__
Detské rádio	website	children's programme	BB, KE, NR, PO, ZA	_DETSKE_
Rádio Frontinus	website	pop music, regional info	ZA	FRONTIN_
Rádio Košice	website	pop music, regional info	BA, ZA, KE, PO	_KOSICE_
Mirjam Rádio	website	Christian in Hungarian language	NR, KE	MIRJAM-R
Rádio Rebeca	website	pop music, regional info	ZA	_REBECA_
Rádio SiTy	website	dance music	BA, TT	*_SITY_*
SKY Rádio	website	pop music, regional info	KE, PO	SKYRADIO
Rádio Šírava	website	pop music, regional info	KE, PO	*SIRAVA*
Rádio Viva	website	pop music, regional info	BA, TT, NR, ZA, BB	*VIVA*__
Rádio WOW	website	pop music, regional info	TN, NR	__WOW___
Rádio SUB FM	website	alternative	TN, NR	_SUB_FM_
Trnavské Rádio	website	pop music, regional info	TT	TRNAVSKE
Záhorácke Rádio	website	pop music, regional info	TT	ZAHORRAD
Rádio v Nitre	website	pop music, regional info	NR	V NITRE

== Local radio stations ==
Name	Website	Format	Broadcast area	Frequency	RDS
Rádio Aetter	website	pop music, youth oriented	Trnava	107.2 FM	_AETTER_
BB FM Rádio	website	pop music, regional info	Banská Bystrica	94.7 FM	_BB_FM__
Rádio Modra	website	pop music, regional info	Modra	106.1 FM	MODRA___
New Model Radio	website	alternative	Banská Bystrica	10B - 211.648 MHz (DAB+ only)	
Rádio Piešťany	website	alternative, chill-out music	Piešťany	90.2 FM	PIESTANY
Rádio Jazz	website	jazz music	Bratislava - Petržalka	92.6 FM	
Top Radio	website	rock, alternative music	Bratislava	97.2 FM	
Rádio Topoľčany	website	pop music, regional info	Topoľčany	102.9 FM	RADIO_TO

== See also ==
- Television in Slovakia
- Slovenská televízia a rozhlas
