= Radio and Television of Slovakia =

Broadcasting network

Coordinates: 48.157°N 17.072°E

Slovenská televízia a rozhlas
- Type: Terrestrial radio and television
- Country: Slovakia
- Headquarters: Slovak Television Building, Slovak Radio Building, Bratislava
- Owner: Government of Slovakia
- Launch date: 1 January 2011; 15 years ago
- Dissolved: 1 July 2024; 2 years ago
- Affiliation: European Broadcasting Union
- Official website: www.stvr.sk
- Replaced: Slovenská televízia (STV); Slovenský rozhlas (SRo)
- Replaced by: Slovak Television and Radio (STVR)

Radio and Television of Slovakia (Slovak: Rozhlas a televízia Slovenska [ˈrɔzɦlas a ˈteleʋiːzɪɐ ˈslɔʋenska]), or RTVS, was a nationwide public broadcasting, state-funded organisation in Slovakia.

== History ==
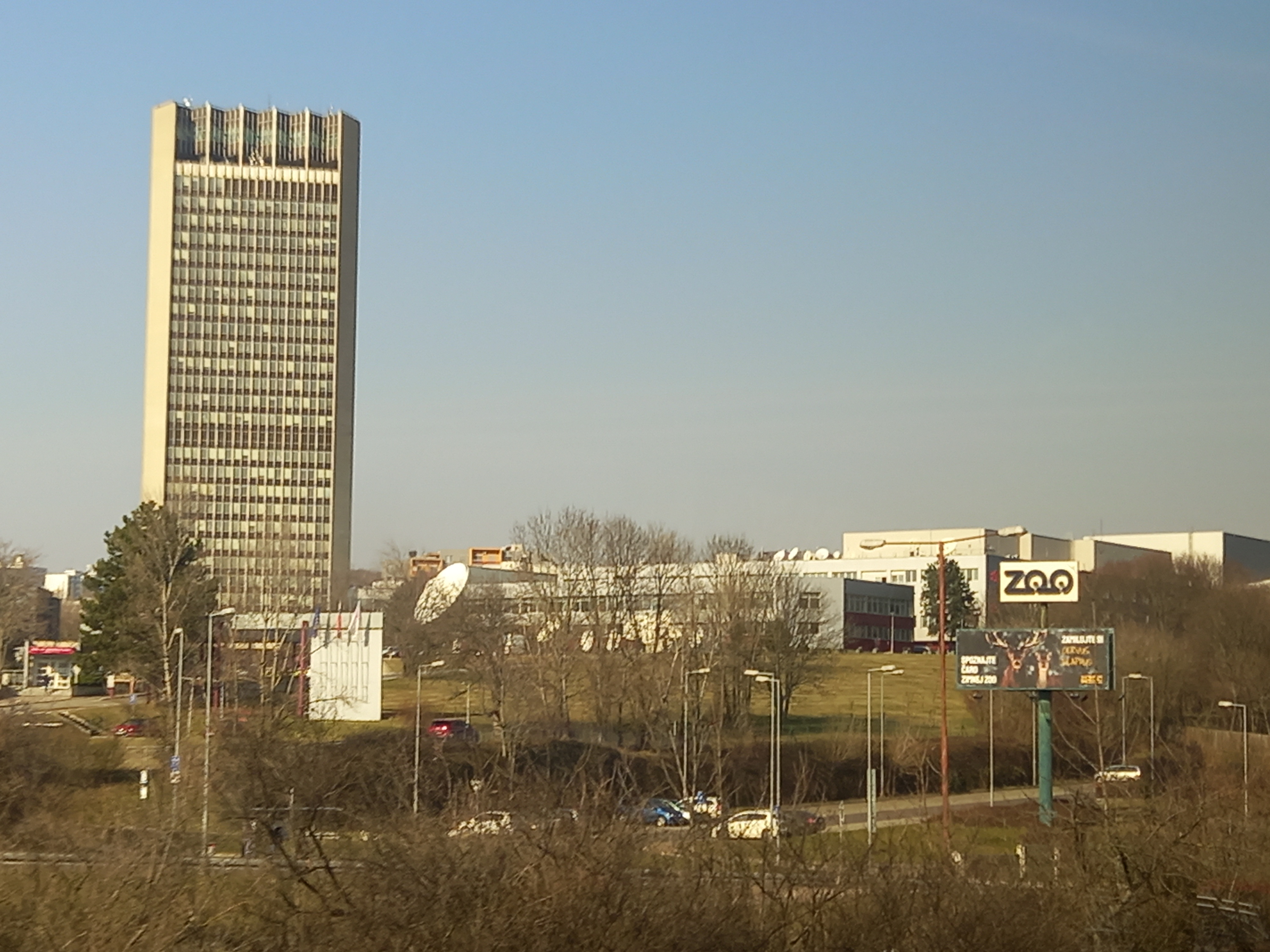
RTVS headquarters in Bratislava

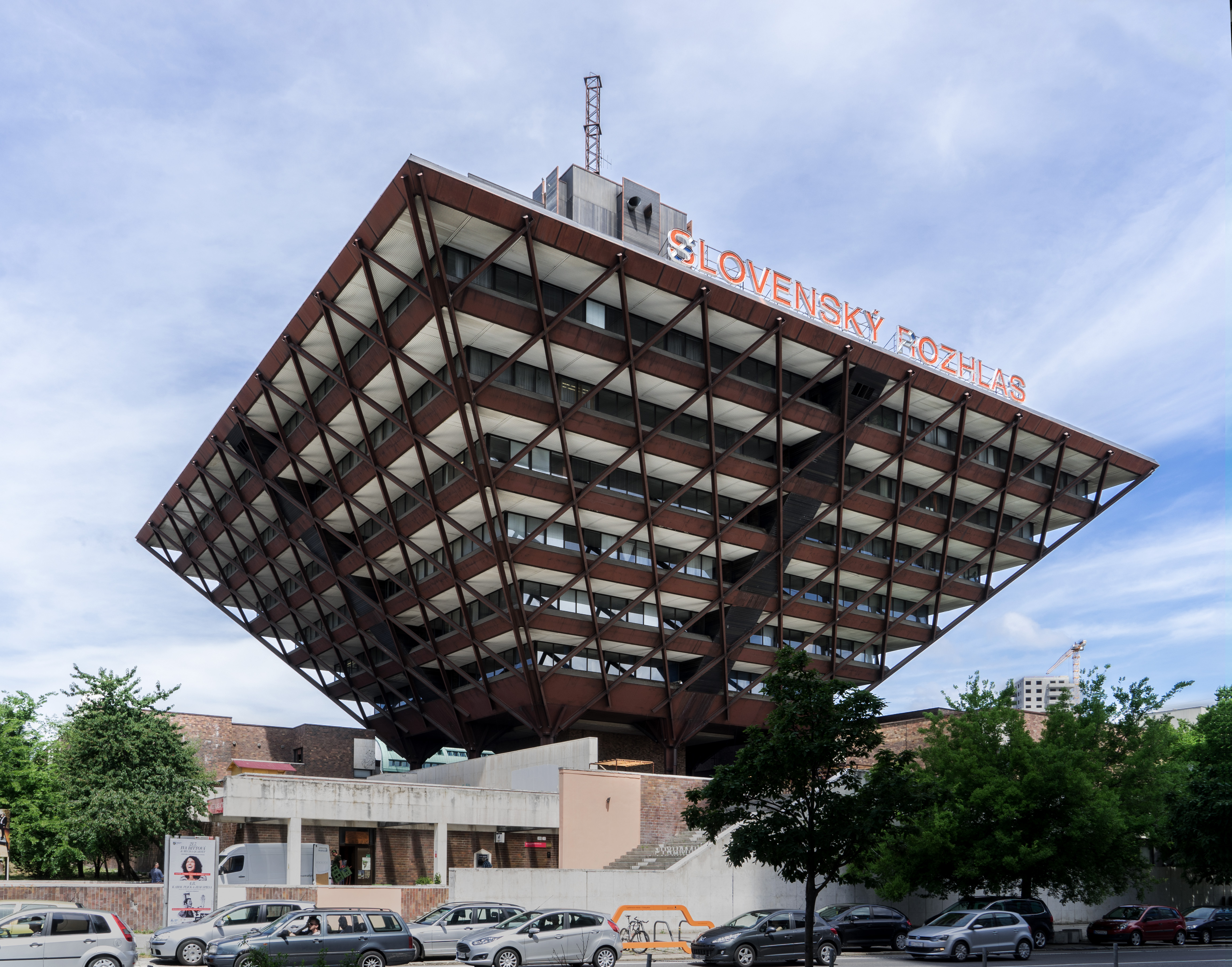
Slovak Radio Building, RTVS radio's headquarters in Bratislava

The organisation was created in 2011 following a merger of Slovenská televízia (Slovak Television) with Slovenský rozhlas (Slovak Radio). It was headquartered in Bratislava. Like its two predecessor organisations, RTVS was a member of the European Broadcasting Union (EBU). RTVS transformed into Slovak Television and Radio (STVR) on 1 July 2024.

== Finances ==
Funding for the RTVS was obtained through advertising and government payments.

There was also a monthly licence fee levied on most individuals registered with electricity retailers and most businesses containing three or more employees. The TV license fee in Slovakia was €4.64 per month (€55.68 per year). The license fee was abolished from 1 July 2023.

== Services ==
=== Radio stations ===
There were 9 national radio stations in 2024:

Station	Programming
Rádio Slovensko	National generalist station; news, entertainment and live broadcasts with pop music
Rádio FM	Targeted at young people, broadcasting mostly alternative and non-mainstream music, entertainment and news bulletins
Rádio Devín	Classical music and culture
Rádio Regina	Three regional radios based in Bratislava, Banská Bystrica, and Košice
Rádio Patria	(in Hungarian: Pátria Rádió) Broadcasts from 06:00 until 18:00 in the Hungarian language as a service for Slovakia's largest ethnic minority group living predominantly in the southern districts bordering Hungary. There are some programmes in Ukrainian, Ruthenian, German, Polish and Czech, but they are transmitted on Radio Regina.
Radio Slovakia International	Broadcasts in six languages: German, Spanish, Slovak, French, English and Russian.
Rádio Pyramída	Classical music (replaced Rádio Klasika in 2016)
Rádio Junior	For children up to the age of 10
Rádio Litera	Radio, stage drama and literary profiles

=== Television channels ===
There were four national television channels in 2024:

- :1 (Jednotka) is a generalist channel, family-oriented television, broadcasting Slovak movies, children's programming, news and documentaries, major sports events at the club and international level.
- :2 (Dvojka) broadcasts documentaries, nature-oriented shows, minor sports events, old Slovak dramas and movies, and also frequently shows classic and art foreign films in the original versions with Slovak subtitles.
- :Šport launched on 20 December 2021. The sports channel broadcasts 24 hours a day, with programs such as live sports events, sports news, lifestyle magazines, and archival materials. With the arrival of the fourth broadcasting circuit, regional sports were given more space, and one of the priorities of the new channel is also the support of education and motivation of all ages for a healthy lifestyle.
- :24 is a news channel launched on 28 February 2022 as a consequence of the emergency situation associated with the 2022 Russian invasion of Ukraine. This channel consists of regular news blocks, supplemented by premieres and reruns of regular news and current affairs programs acquired from the other channels and Rádio Slovensko.

==== Defunct ====
- :3 (Trojka) focused on archive programming. The channel discontinued operations on 30 November 2022.

== General Directors ==
The General Director was elected by the National Council of the Slovak Republic.

- Miloslava Zemková (2011–2012)
- Daniela Vašinová and Peter Ondro (2012), acting
- Václav Mika (2012–2017)
- Jaroslav Rezník (2017–2022)
- Ľuboš Machaj (2022–2024)

== News and objectivity ==
During the term of the General Director Václav Mika (2012–2017), the content and graphics of the news have changed significantly. The title also included the RTVS brand, titled Správy RTVS. The news broadcasting programmes were initially struggling with very low audiences on 18 December 2012 with only a 7.8% share.

Over time, the audience began to grow, and RTVS news has started to appear as the most objective news on TV in public opinion surveys, with exceptions lasting by now. However, after the election of Jaroslav Reznik as General Director in 2017, who was nominated by the SNS party, which was in government, the situation in the newsroom has changed. A new head of the news section has been appointed, under whose leadership, according to most of the journalists, the content of the news was being manipulated. The tense atmosphere led to the departure of a dozen journalists in 2018. More and more space in the news was reserved to the SNS party officials, including journeys of Andrej Danko, the party leader, serving till 2020 as Speaker of the Parliament, to Russia. The topic of his plagiarism in rigorous work was also not addressed in the main part of the news.

After the parliamentary elections in 2020 and the new government appointed, news too favorable towards the governmental or oppositional parties seem to not appear anymore; nonetheless, some of the content was still manipulated.

In 2024, RTVS news has been the most objective TV news in Slovakia in public opinion surveys.

== Closure ==
In April 2024, the Slovak government approved the Television and Radio Act proposed by prime minister Robert Fico and minister of culture Martina Šimkovičová over alleged partiality of the broadcaster. The move has been criticised by then-president of Slovakia Zuzana Čaputová, Slovakia's opposition and the EBU's director general Noel Curran as potentially undermining the independence of public broadcasting in the country.

The bill was passed on 20 June 2024 by the Parliament of Slovakia. As such, RTVS was closed by 1 July 2024 and replaced by a new broadcaster, Slovak Television and Radio (STVR). The legislation was passed by 78 out of 78 present lawmakers, with the opposition not taking part in the vote.

RTVS closure and establishment of STVR Martina Šimkovičová (SNS)
Ballot →	20 June 2024
Required majority →	40 out of 78 (simple)
Yes: • SMER-SD (42); • HLAS-SD (26); • SNS (10)	78 / 150
No	0 / 150
Abstentions	0 / 150
Absentees: • PS (32); • HLAS-SD (1); • Slovensko (16); • KDH (12); • SaS (11)	72 / 150

== Logos and identities ==
=== RTVS television channels ===
Logo of Jednotka

Logo of Dvojka

Logo of Trojka

Logo of :Šport

Logo of :24

=== RTVS radio stations ===
Logo of Rádio Slovensko

Logo of Rádio FM

Logo of Rádio Devín

Logo of Rádio Regina

Logo of Rádio Patria

Logo of Rádio Slovakia International

Logo of Rádio Pyramída

Logo of Rádio Junior

Logo of Rádio Litera

== See also ==
- Television in Slovakia
- European Broadcasting Union
- Czechoslovak Television
- Slovak Television
