= Slovenský rozhlas =

Former state-owned radio broadcaster in Slovakia

Coordinates: 48°09′15″N 17°06′51″E

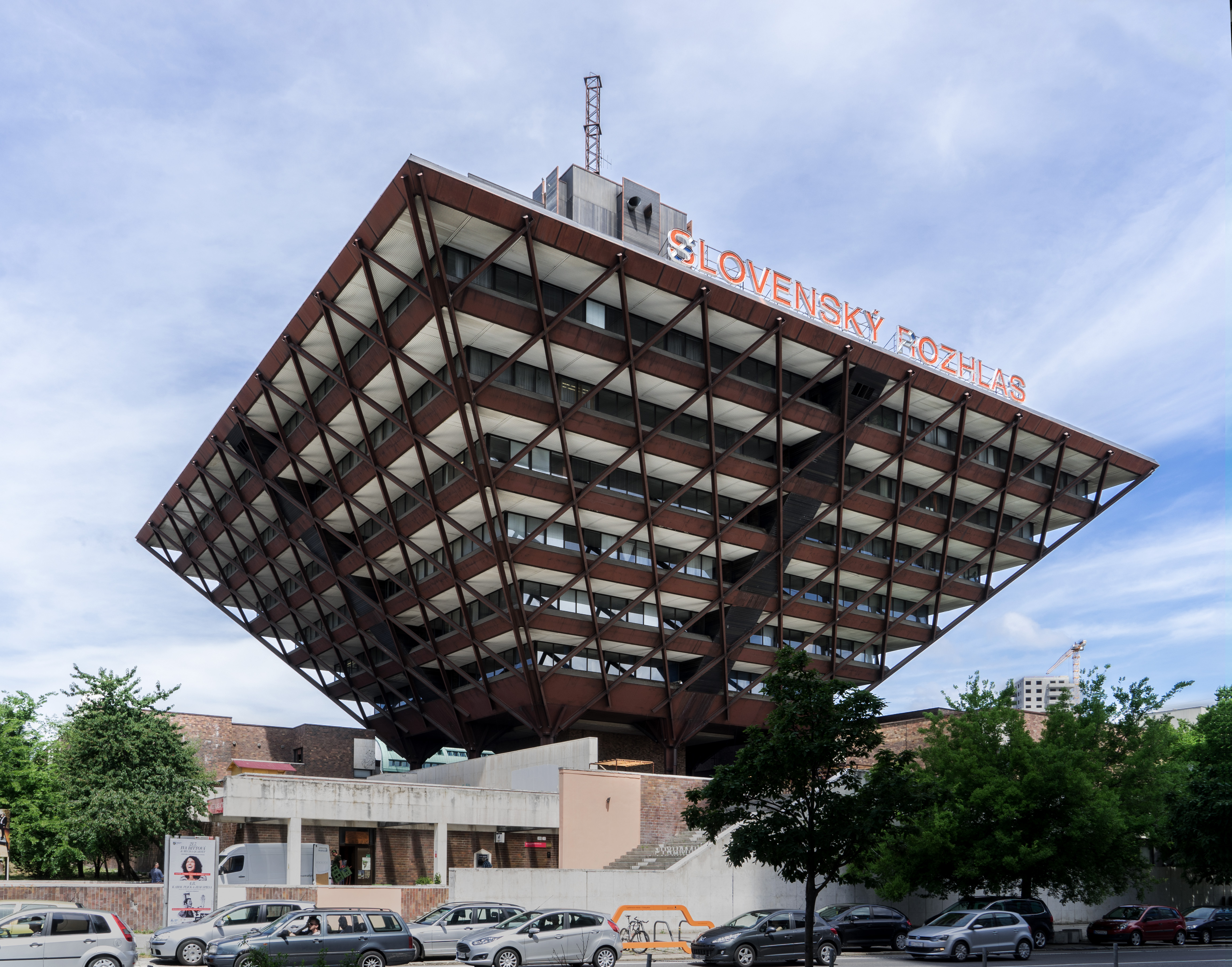
- Type: Public radio broadcaster
- Country: Slovakia
- Headquarters: Slovak Radio Building, Bratislava
- Owner: Government of Slovakia
- Launch date: 3 August 1926
- Dissolved: 1 January 2011 (merged into RTVS)
- Replaced by: Rozhlas a televízia Slovenska (RTVS)

Slovenský rozhlas (Slovak pronunciation: [ˈslɔʋenskiː ˈrɔzɦlas], lit. 'Slovak Radio') or SRo was a state-owned nationwide public-service radio broadcaster in Slovakia. It was headquartered in Bratislava in a building shaped like an inverted pyramid, which currently serves as STVR radio's headquarters.

== History ==
SRo began broadcasting from Bratislava, Czechoslovakia. Initially broadcast twice per week on 3 August 1926, it began to broadcast daily from 2 October 1926. The broadcaster also managed the Slovak Radio Children's Choir founded in 1953 and Slovak Radio Symphony Orchestra (SOSR) founded in 1929, the latter then-known as Czechoslovak Radio Symphony Orchestra.

Wanting to improve finance of the state-owned public television broadcaster Slovenská televízia (lit. 'Slovak Television') on 1 January 2011 SRo merged with Slovenská televízia to create Radio and Television of Slovakia.

SRo was a full member of the European Broadcasting Union between 1993 and 2011.

== Channels ==
When merged with Slovenská televízia in 2011, SRo operated nine radio channels, all of which were continued as a part of Rozhlas a televízia Slovenska.

- SRo 1: Rádio Slovensko
- SRo 2: Rádio Regina
- SRo 3: Rádio Devín
- SRo 4: Rádio FM
- SRo 5: Rádio Patria
- SRo 6: Radio Slovakia International

The following were digital-only channels:

- SRo 7: Rádio Klasika (classical music)
- SRo 8: Rádio Litera (drama)
- SRo 9: Rádio Junior (for children up to age 10)

== See also ==
- Radio and Television Slovakia, SRo's successor
- List of radio stations in Slovakia
- Slovak Radio Symphony Orchestra
