= Michal Kovačič =

Slovak journalist (born 1983)

- Born: 1983 (age 42–43); Bratislava, Czechoslovakia
- Children: Mila
- Presenting career
- Show: Na Telo; Main News; Morning News
- Network: Markíza; Fun Rádio; Slovak Television

Michal Kovačič (born 1983) is a Slovak journalist and talk show host.

== Early life ==
Born in Bratislava, Kovačič studied law at the Comenius University, graduating in 2009. He started as a production assistant before becoming a news presenter and reporter for Slovenská televízia in February 2004. Between 2007 and 2008, Kovačič was a news presenter on Fun Rádio.

== Career ==
Kovačič joined the main news team at the private Markíza television station in 2008, but took a short break from broadcasting in 2010 to undertake an internship in the United States on CNN. In 2018, he started hosting the political talk show Na Telo on Markíza, which quickly established itself as the most influential political talk show in Slovakia. In 2022, Kovačič finished eighth place as one of the contestants in Let's Dance.

Following the 2023 Slovak parliamentary election, the government of Slovakia was reported to pressure Markíza to align its narratives with the government's point of view through the threat of redirecting advertising funds from governmental institutions and public-owned firms to other broadcasters. Kovačič emerged amongst the leaders of Markíza journalists, who saw these developments as a censorship attempt. Wanting to resist these pressures, the journalists started to unite with Kovačič as the head of the new trade union organization.

When the government of Slovakia started to boycott Na Telo in April 2024, Kovačič broadcast a short unauthorized speech at the end of Na Telo, accusing the Markíza management for being complicit in the government's agenda of censoring the political content in the media, mirroring the approach of Viktor Orbán in Hungary. Following the broadcast, Kovačič was taken off-screen. Over a hundred Markíza journalists wrote a letter in support of Kovačič, demanding his return as a host of Na Telo and guarantees of journalistic independence in Markíza broadcasting. He was fired one month after the incident and has since considered legal action.

Following his exit from Markíza, Kovačič started his own media project named 360tka. It's a subscription-based video-only news portal that focuses on politics and related socio-economic issues.

== Personal life ==
In 2017, Kovačič married the journalist Zuzana Hanzelová. They spent their honeymoon volunteering in Nicaragua. The couple announced they were expecting their first child in 2024.
