= 360tka =

Slovak video-only news portal

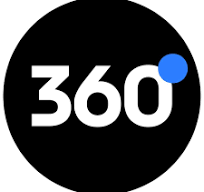
- Website type: News website
- Available in: Slovak, English
- Headquarters: Bratislava
- Country of origin: Slovakia
- Managing director: Michal Kovačič
- Website: www.360tka.sk
- Commercial: Yes
- Registration: Optional
- Launched: 17 November 2024; 22 months ago
- Current status: Active

360tka (also styled 360°) is a Slovak video-only news portal. It was started by Michal Kovačič. Its primary focus is news and investigative reporting with an emphasis on politics and related socio-economic issues. 360tka publishes newsreels, in-depth interviews, and moderated discussions. Occasional live moderated discussions are hosted at Kácečko.

The portal went live on November 17, 2024. Its first video segment was a moderated discussion with Milan Kňažko, sk:Václav Moravec, and sk:Fero Joke. Ahead of its launch, 360tka raised 594,000 euros from 16,470 donors and supporters through a cs:Donio crowdsourcing campaign. 360tka has ten employees, and its newsroom comprises several veteran reporters. The portal is subscription-supported.

== Reception ==
360tka was ranked #6 among Slovak Apple news podcasts and #16 among all Slovak podcasts in December 2025.

== Notable reporting ==
In April 2025, 360tka uncovered potential misappropriation of EU funds. This issue was picked up by mainstream media in Slovakia and by EU regulators. In February 2025, 360tka published the results of a poll it commissioned through the Slovak agency Focus that ranked leading political figures by trustworthiness. This report was syndicated both in and outside of Slovakia. In June 2025, 360tka published the results of another poll it commissioned, which projected Progressive Slovakia as the most likely winner if a snap election were held that month. The news story was picked up by TASR and syndicated by several news outlets.
