= List of international radio broadcasters =

International radio broadcasters are legally licensed stations that broadcast from a host nation to another nation or nations. Such stations are operated both as non-commercial enterprises, such as the BBC World Service, and commercial operations, such as WWCR. The following is a list of such stations with links to entries about each one:

== A ==
- Arirang Radio - public English radio station promoting South Korea
- Voice of America - broadcasting from studios in Washington, D.C., United States, and transmitting by a network of terrestrial transmitters in various countries linked by the use of global satellite services.
- Radiodifusión Argentina al Exterior
- Radio Australia
- Radio Free Asia
- Amar FM
- Radio Ayecah International USA

== B ==
- BBC World Service - broadcasting from studios at Broadcasting House in London, England; (Bush House until June 2012 and transmitting by a network of terrestrial transmitters in various countries linked by the use of global satellite services.
- Radio Bulgaria

== C ==
- Radio Cairo (ERTU; Egypt)
- Radio Canada International
- Channel Africa (South Africa)
- Voice of Croatia
- China Radio International
- CVC RADIO INDIA

== D ==
- Democratic Voice of Burma - Burmese opposition broadcasting service based in Oslo, Norway.
- Deutsche Welle - the official international broadcasting service of Germany.

== E ==
- Radio Exterior de España (international section of Radio Nacional de España; Spain)
- Radio Free Europe/Radio Liberty - a non-profit organization in Prague, founded by the US-Government and the National Committee for a Free Europe

== F ==
- Radio France Internationale - Radio France Internationale (RFI)

== G ==
- Voice of Greece

== H ==
- Radio Habana Cuba
- HCJB (Ecuador)

== I ==
- All India Radio Voice of Indonesia
- Islamic Republic of Iran Broadcasting
- Israel Radio International

== J ==
- Radio Japan

== K ==
- Voice of Kenya
- KBS World Radio (the former Radio Korea International, Radio Korea and Voice of Free Korea; South Korea)
- Voice of Korea (the former Radio Pyongyang; North Korea)

== L ==
- Radio Luxembourg

== M ==
- Radio Maria
- Voice of Malaysia
- Magyar Rádió (Hungary)
- Médi 1 (also known as Radio Méditerranée Internationale)

== N ==
- Nepali Sanchar Radio
- Radio Nepal
- Radio New Zealand
- Voice of Youth Nirmala
- Voice of Reshmi Xavier

== O ==
- Austrian Radio Ö1 International (the former Radio Austria International)

== P ==
- Radyo Pilipinas World Service
- Radio Prague (Czech Republic)
- Polskie Radio (the former Radio Polonia; Poland)
- RDP Internacional (Rádio e Televisão de Portugal) Portugal

== R ==
- Radio Canada International
- Radio Prague
- Radio RAI International (Italy)
- Radio Romania International
- Voice of Russia - the former Radio Moscow

== S ==
- Singapore Broadcasting Corporation
- Radio Slovakia International
- Sri Lanka Broadcasting Corporation
- SR International - Radio Sweden

== T ==
- Radio Taiwan International (the former Voice of Free China)
- Radio Thailand (Other Name is National Broadcasting Services of Thailand)
- Radio Tirana (Albania)
- Trans World Radio
- Voice of Turkey

== U ==
- Radio Ukraine International
- United Nations Radio

== V ==
- Vatican Radio
- Voice of Vietnam
- Radio Vlaanderen Internationaal (Belgium)

== W ==
- WRN Broadcast
