= Trojka (TV channel) =

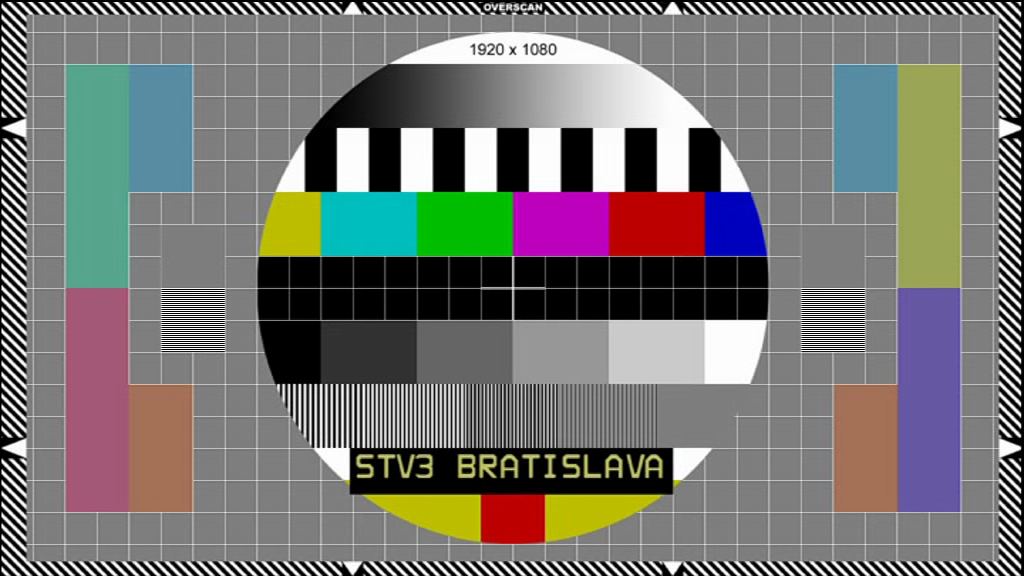
- Country: Slovakia

Programming
- Picture format: 4:3/16:9 1080i (HD), 576i (SD)

Ownership
- Owner: RTVS (Rozhlas a televízia Slovenska)
- Sister channels: Jednotka; Dvojka; :Šport; :24

History
- Launched: 6 July 1991; 35 years ago (as TA3); 1 January 1993; 33 years ago (as STV3)
- Closed: 30 November 2022; 3 years ago
- Former names: TA3 (1991-1993)

Links
- Website: www.rtvs.sk

Availability (at time of closure)

Terrestrial
- DVB-T: MUX 3 (FTA) (SD); MUX 1 (FTA) (HD)

Trojka (:3 formerly STV3) was a Slovak television channel owned and operated by RTVS. Originally a sports channel in its first version. It ended on December 1, 2022, at 12:00 am CET.

== History ==
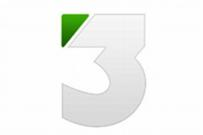
Logo of the first iteration of Trojka, from 2004 to 2012.

It was originally launched on 6 July 1991 as a sports channel. Due to the financial problems of RTVS at the time, Trojka ended its broadcasting on June 30, 2011. It was relaunched on 22 December 2019 at 6am as a channel showing archived content from RTVS and its predecessors STV and ČST for an older audience. The channel was carried in both SD and HD formats. In May 2020, it stopped broadcasting its overnight repeats, closing down between midnight and 6am.

From February 28 to June 9, 2022, out of the need from RTVS to cover the Russian invasion of Ukraine, the channel was temporarily replaced by :24. Broadcasts resumed after this date, when :24 obtained its own permanent slot.

RTVS announced in September 2022 that it would close the channel on November 30 due to budget cuts. Trojka received the least amount of money out of the RTVS channels; the annual operating costs were estimated to be of €2 million per year. Its Czech counterpart ČT3 was also being planned to close, whose operating costs doubled those of Trojka (€4 million). RTVS was outlining plans for the fate of its presenters, programs and imports.

=== Final day on air ===
On November 30, 2022, Trojka announced the end of the channel itself on that day, causing chaos around the Slovak TV community. After the end of the program Štedrý deň at 12:00 am on December 1, the channel stopped airing, and the next morning, anyone who pressed the Text button while viewing Trojka would get a screen that looks like it got wiped out with the only text on the screen being P100. Some days later, RTVS removed teletext from the channel. Viewers that go to the channel to watch today will get a screen with the Trojka logo on the left with the text on the right saying the following:

Programová služba Trojka ukončila vysielanie 30. novembra 2022.

Ďakujeme za vašu priazeň.

Viac informácií nájdete na www.rtvs.sk

There will be also a space background if one were to watch the channel today. As of December 7, 2022, RTVS removed live broadcasting for Trojka.

== Availability ==
- Satellite: CS Link, Skylink, Digi Slovakia, Magio Sat
- Cable: Satro
- IPTV: Magio TV, Fiber TV
