= Katrin Lengyelová =

- Born: Katarína Mravcová; 11 July 1972 (age 54); Bratislava, Czechoslovakia (now Slovakia)
- Presenting career
- Show: financial news (formerly); main news; political debates In Politics; documentary talk show Portrait
- Stations: STV (formerly); TA3
- Time slot: 2002–2003; October 2011–present
- Country: Slovakia
- Previous shows: Financial and economic news (2002–2003)

Mgr. Katarína "Katrin" Lengyelová (Slovak pronunciation: [ˈkatariːna ˈkatrin ˈleɲɟelɔʋaː]), (Note: formerly Krnáčová [ˈkr̩naːtʂɔʋaː]) née Mravcová [ˈmrawtsɔʋaː] (born 11 July 1972) is Slovak TV presenter, journalist, and former radio presenter.

== Early life and education ==
In 2001, Lengyelová graduated of the Faculty of Arts at the Comenius University, Bratislava, with a degree in Slovak language and literature.

== Career ==
After Lengyelová had been working as a reporter and TV news presenter on Slovenská televízia between 2000 and 2002, she became presenter of financial and economic news on TA3 from 2002 until 2003. Lengyelová worked as radio presented on radio B1 between 2005 and 2006, then Radio Jemné Melódie from 2006 until 2008 in radio Jemné Melódie (lit. 'Soft Melodies'.

Between 2010 and 2011, Lengyelová was a children helpline consultant at Slovak Committee of UNICEF between 2010 and 2011, after which she returned to TA3 in October 2011. Lengyelová started as a presenter of politics-related news titled V politike (lit. 'In Politics') and documentary talk show Portrét (lit. 'Portrait') host.
