= Ruku na to =

Slovak TV game show

In 2005 and 2006, STV in Slovakia got its own version of Deal or No Deal, called Ruku na to. It was hosted by Peter Šarkan Novák. The top prize was 5,000,000 korún (about US$225,000, €166,000, or £134,000).

== Case values ==
Here are the case values of this show, as follows:

Sk 1
Sk 2
Sk 5
Sk 10
Sk 20
Sk 50
Sk 100
Sk 250
Sk 500
Sk 1,000
Sk 2,500
Sk 5,000
Sk 7,500

Sk 10,000
Sk 25,000
Sk 50,000
Sk 75,000
Sk 100,000
Sk 200,000
Sk 300,000
Sk 400,000
Sk 500,000
Sk 750,000
Sk 1,000,000
Sk 2,500,000
Sk 5,000,000
