= Slovak Television and Radio =

Public broadcaster of Slovakia

Coordinates: 48.157°N 17.072°E

Slovenská televízia a rozhlas
- Type: Terrestrial radio and television
- Country: Slovakia
- Headquarters: Slovak Television Building, Slovak Radio Building, Bratislava
- Owner: Government of Slovakia
- Key people: Martina Flašíková
- Launch date: 1 July 2024; 2 years ago
- Affiliation: European Broadcasting Union
- Official website: stvr.sk
- Replaced: Radio and Television of Slovakia (RTVS)

Slovak Television and Radio (Slovak: Slovenská televízia a rozhlas [ˈslɔʋenskaː ˈteleʋiːzɪɐ a ˈrɔzɦlas]), in short STVR is a nationwide public broadcasting, state-funded organisation in Slovakia. Its headquarters are located in Bratislava and led by General Director Martina Flašíková.

Radio and Television of Slovakia (RTVS) transformed into Slovak Television and Radio (STVR) on 1 July 2024, though the RTVS logo and visual layout were retained for almost two years.

STVR is a member of the European Broadcasting Union (EBU).

== History ==
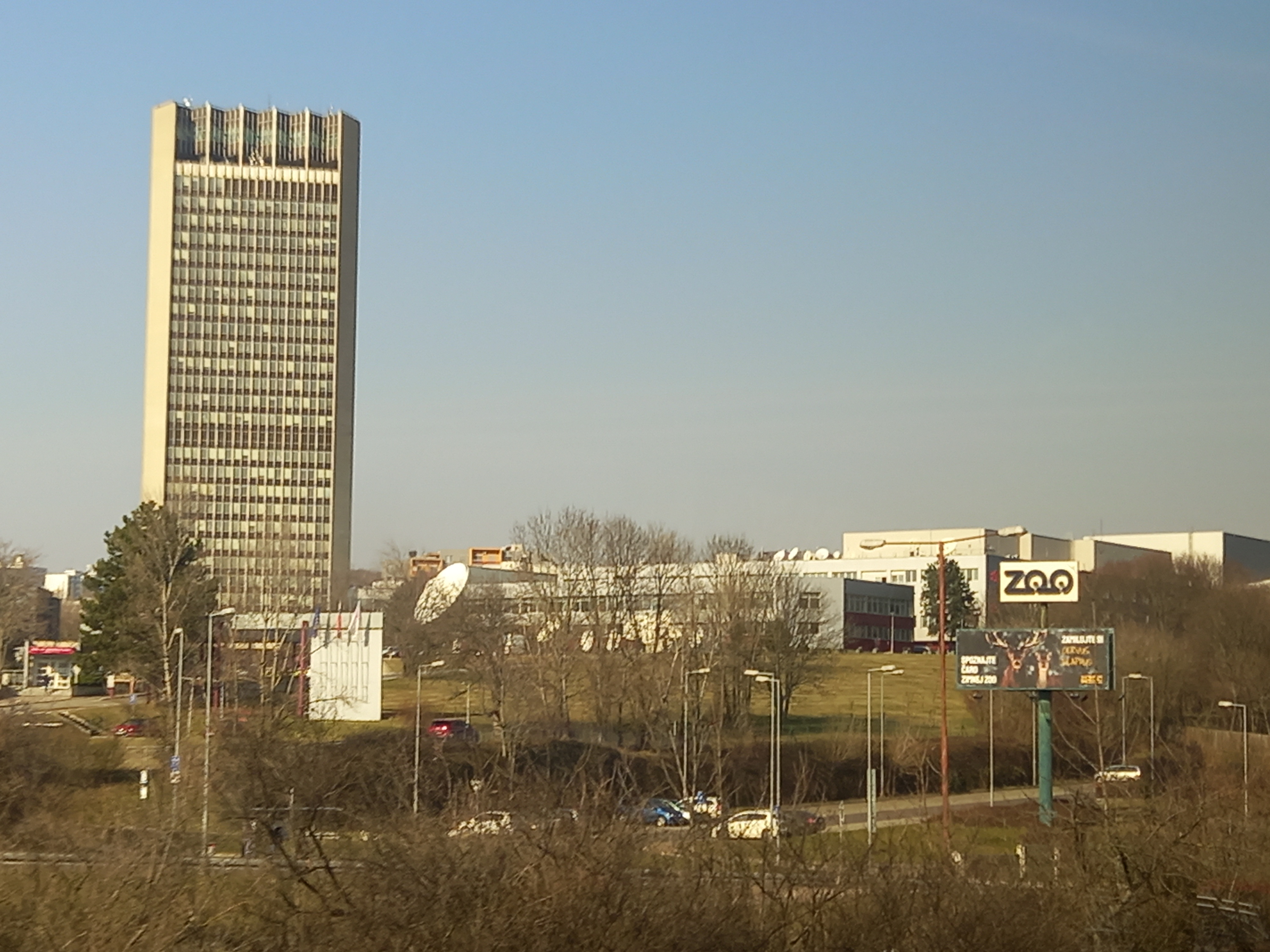
STVR TV's headquarters in Bratislava

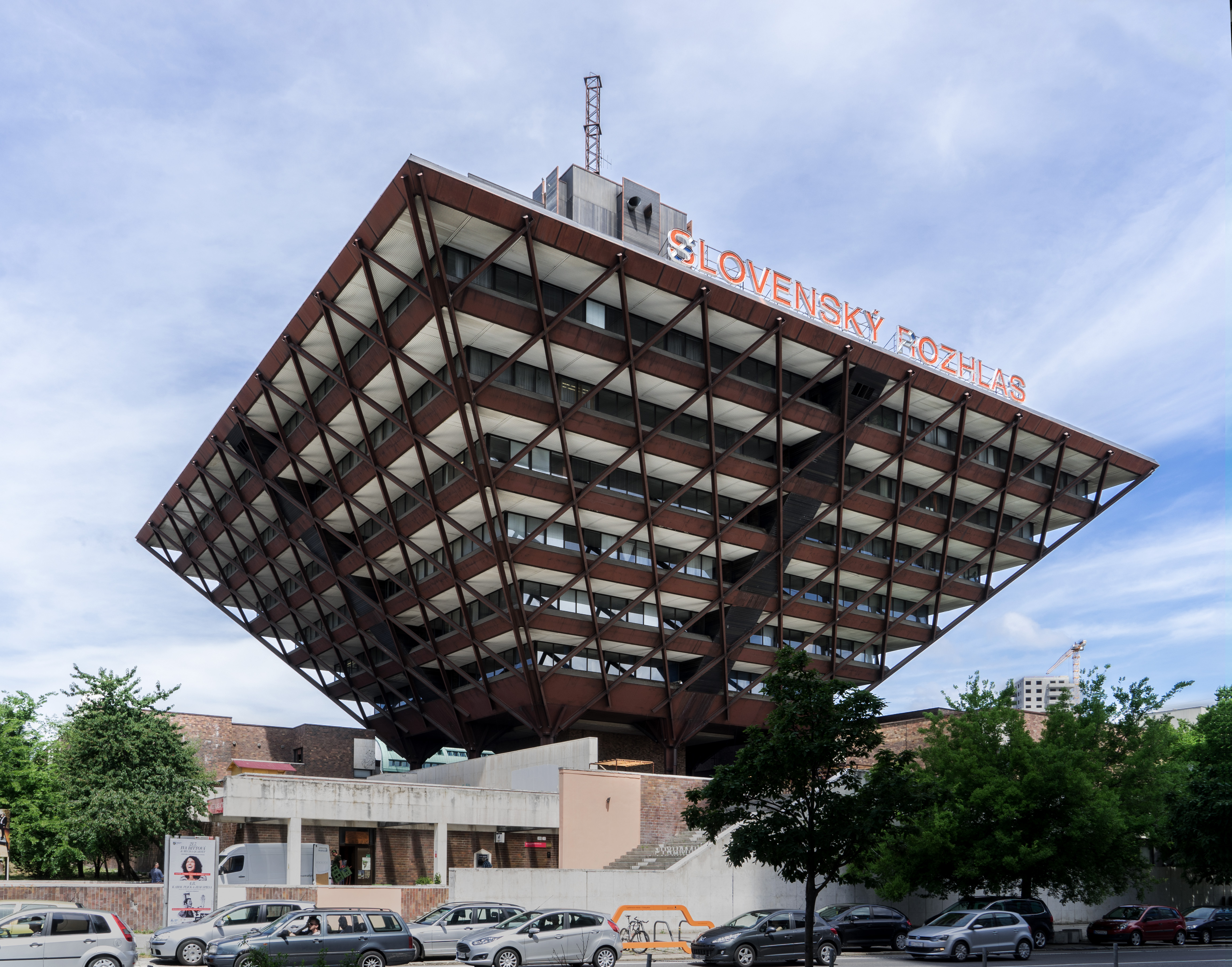
Slovak Radio Building, STVR radio's headquarters in Bratislava

=== First draft amendment (STaR) ===
On 11 March 2024, the Ministry of Culture of the Slovak Republic presented a proposal to amend the RTVS, which it included in the interdepartmental comment procedure. According to him, RTVS was supposed to replaced by Slovak Television and Radio (STaR). The amendment was supposed to change the functioning of the supervisory board, which today has nine members elected by members of parliament with a simple majority, reducing its number to seven members. Three of them were to be appointed and fired directly by the Minister of Culture and one on the proposal of the Minister of Finance. The STaR Council should have had the power to elect the director general of public media, which is currently decided by parliamentarians by majority vote. Also worth highlighting is the new Programming Council, which was supposed to evaluate and control public television and radio programs "from the point of view of respecting the character of public broadcasting". According to the amendment, the Program Council should have 11 members, nine of whom would be elected by members of Parliament. The remaining two members of the steering committee should be chosen from among themselves by the employees of the new Slovak Television and Radio. Such an amendment would conflict with European legislation on public media, which was debated by the European Parliament the day after the amendment was published.

Over 1,200 RTVS employees and external collaborators have signed a declaration in favor of public RTVS, with which they draw attention to the RTVS bill, which threatens the independence of public law broadcasting. They were joined by Slovak and Czech civil society organizations who also reject interference with the independence of RTVS, signing an appeal addressed to the European institutions and other international organizations. International journalistic organizations also reacted to the amendment, and media freedom groups called for the bill's withdrawal. The statement was signed by the International Press Institute (IPI), the committee to Protect Journalists (CPJ), the European Broadcasting Union (EBU), the European Center for Press and Media Freedom (ECPMF), by the European Federation of Journalists (EFJ), Free Press Unlimited (FPU), OBC Transeuropa (OBCT) and Reporters Without Borders (RSF).

RTVS submitted comments to the interdepartmental comment procedure on the draft amendment, which was in fundamental contradiction with the European principles of protection of the independence of public media and in conflict with the approved European law on media freedom. After pressure from the public and experts with 327 comments on the draft law on Slovak television and radio, it was sent back to the Legislative Council of the Government of the Slovak Republic

=== Second draft amendment (STVR) ===
On 24 April, R. Fico's government approved an amended bill on television and radio, proposed by Prime Minister Robert Fico and Minister of Culture Martina Šimkovičová due to the alleged bias of the RTVS, which is "continuously fighting with the government". The head of the service office of the Ministry of Culture Lukáš Machala said that the reason for the amendment of the RTVS is a purely political decision. Compared to the first proposal, the ministry canceled the program board and the possibility of dismissing the director without reason, which would violate European legislation.

The creation of a new ethics commission body was added in the amendment. The RTVS still has a ten-member ethics commission, but its operation is not regulated by law, but only by statute. According to the proposal, the ethics commission would be made up of nine members, appointed for six-year terms. They must be nominated by church organisations, organizations representing disabled people and minorities, the self-governed Slovak Olympic Committee, the Slovak Academy of Sciences and Matica slovenská. The revised amendment also changes the supervisory board of Slovak Television and Radio, which elects the director. The council should continue to have nine members elected for six-year terms. Four members will be appointed and dismissed by the Minister of Culture, one on a proposal from the Ministry of Finance, and five will be elected by members of Parliament.

Despite the amendments, according to Karol Lovaš of the Institute for Communication Studies and Journalism at Charles University and Pavol Szalai of Reporters Without Borders, the amendment still conflicts with European law on media freedom. In response, the RTVS collaborators formed the coordination committee of the RTVS collaborators' initiative for public law and independence, the aim of which is to underline the fundamental importance of the independent and public character of the RTVS, but also to fight for the protection of these principles. Members committed to protecting public law and freedom of expression and at the same time called on the government to respect the four fundamental principles that should be preserved in any intervention in the RTVS law.

== Finances ==
Funding for the STVR is obtained through advertising and government payments.

== Radio stations ==
All stations can be tuned into using satellite (Astra 3B), DAB, FM, DVB-T, and online streaming.

=== Current ===
Station	Programming
Rádio Slovensko	National generalist station; news, entertainment and live broadcasts with pop music
Rádio FM	Targeted at young people, broadcasting mostly alternative and non-mainstream music, entertainment and news bulletins
Rádio Devín	Classical music and culture
Rádio Regina	Three regional radios based in Bratislava, Banská Bystrica, and Košice
Rádio Patria	(in Hungarian: Pátria Rádió) Broadcasts from 06:00 until 18:00 in the Hungarian language as a service for Slovakia's largest ethnic minority group living predominantly in the southern districts bordering Hungary. There are some programmes in Ukrainian, Ruthenian, German, Polish and Czech, but they are transmitted on Radio Regina.
Radio Slovakia International	Broadcasts in six languages: German, Spanish, Slovak, French, English and Russian.
Rádio Junior	For children up to the age of 10
Rádio Litera	Radio, stage drama and literary profiles

=== Defunct ===
Station	Programming	Closed
Rádio Pyramída	Classical music (replaced Rádio Klasika in 2016)	2025

== Television channels ==
There are 4 national television channels:

=== Current ===
- 1 (Jednotka) is a generalist channel, family-oriented television, broadcasting Czech and Slovak movies, children's programming, news and documentaries, major sport events on club and international level.
- 2 (Dvojka) broadcasts documentaries, mature-oriented shows, minor sport events, old Czech and Slovak dramas and movies, and also frequently shows classic and art foreign films in the original versions with Slovak subtitles.
- Šport launched on 20 December 2021. The sports channel broadcasts 24 hours a day, programs such as live sport events, sport news, lifestyle magazines and archival materials. With the arrival of the fourth broadcasting circuit, regional sport was given more space, and one of the priorities of the new channel is also the support of education and motivation of all ages for a healthy lifestyle.
- 24 is a news channel launched on 28 February 2022 as a consequence of the emergency situation associated with the 2022 Russian invasion of Ukraine. This channel consists of regular news blocks, supplemented by premieres and reruns of regular news and current affairs programs acquired from the other channels and Rádio Slovensko.

== General Directors ==
The General Director is elected by a nine-member council with four candidates from the Ministry of Culture of the Slovak Republic. The advisory body of the council is a nine-member ethics commission.

- Igor Slanina (2024–2025), acting
- Martina Flašíková (2025–present)

== Logos and identities ==
Logo of Slovak Radio (2026)

Logo of Slovak Television (2026)

=== STVR television channels ===
Logo of Jednotka

Logo of Dvojka

Logo of Šport

Logo of 24

=== STVR radio stations ===
Logo of Rádio Slovensko

Logo of Rádio Devín

Logo of Rádio Junior

Logo of Rádio Litera

Logo of Rádio Patria

Logo of Rádio Regina

==== Former radio stations ====
Logo of Rádio Pyramída (Note: Rádio Pyramída used its logo introduced in 2022 under the RTVS branding, until the station closed in 2025, and consequently was not included when the new logos for STVR were introduced on 28 January 2026.)

== See also ==
- Television in Slovakia
- European Broadcasting Union
- Czechoslovak Television
- Slovak Television
- Radio and Television of Slovakia
