= News Agency of the Slovak Republic =

Slovak news agency

The News Agency of the Slovak Republic (Slovak: Tlačová agentúra Slovenskej republiky; abbreviation TASR or TASR-Slovakia) is a Slovak news agency founded on 30 January 1992. Its headquarters are located in the Slovak capital Bratislava. Its main goal is to gather, store and provide news coverage of Slovak and international events in text, photo, audio and video form.

The News Agency of the Slovak Republic (TASR) is a public service, national and independent institution. It was set up via Act No. 358/2008 on the News Agency of the Slovak Republic.

TASR is not subsidised by the state; rather, it earns money by selling its products and agency news coverage. It enters into contracts with the state to fulfill objectives in the public interest as stipulated in the law. TASR is headed by a director-general, who acts as its statutory body. The post is currently held by Dr. Vladimír Puchala. The director-general is voted in by a five-strong administrative board. The board, for its part, is elected by Parliament. It is made up of an expert in the media, an economist, a lawyer, an IT specialist and an employee representative.

TASR is the leader on Slovakia's news agency market. It is a member of the European Alliance of Press Agencies.
