= TA3 =

- Country: Slovakia
- Headquarters: Bratislava, Slovakia

Programming
- Picture format: 1080i (HDTV)

Ownership
- Owner: Blueberg Media

History
- Launched: 23 September 2001; 25 years ago

Links
- Webcast: www.ta3.com/live/ (Slovak only)
- Website: ta3.com

Availability

Terrestrial
- DVB-T: MUX 2 (FTA) (SD)

TA3 (Slovak pronunciation: [ˈteː aː ˈtri]) is a Slovak private news channel. It started officially broadcasting on 23 September 2001, although its first (special) broadcast was on 11 September 2001 due to the September 11 attacks, which coincided with scheduled testing of the service. The headquarters are located in Bratislava, in the Ružinov borough.

The channel was originally 55-percent owned by Millennium Electronics, a British firm with little media experience. J&T Finance Group acquired this stake in 2002 and became majority owner in 2003. In January 2007, J&T agreed to buy the channel JOJ from Grafobal Group, which in turn took over TA3. In January 2022, Grafobal, the group of businessman Ivan Kmotrík, sold TA3 to Blueberg Media, the company of Czech businessman Michal Voráček.

== TV presenters ==
- Béla Bugár
- Katrin Lengyelová
- Lucia Nicholsonová

== Broadcasting ==
TA3 broadcasts from 6:00 a.m. until 1:00 a.m. on weekdays, and on weekends from 7:00 a.m. At night, Ring TV broadcasts on this channel.

=== HD ===
High-definition (HD) broadcasting via satellite was started in December 2016 using Astra 3B capacity.
