= Markíza Dajto =

- Country: Slovakia
- Broadcast area: Slovakia
- Headquarters: Záhorská Bystrica, Bratislava

Programming
- Language: Slovak
- Picture format: 16:9 - 1080i (HDTV), 576i (SDTV)

Ownership
- Owner: Central European Media Enterprises
- Sister channels: Markíza; Markíza Doma; Markíza KRIMI; Markíza Klasik; Markíza International

History
- Launched: 20 August 2012
- Replaced: TV Fooor
- Former names: Dajto (20 August 2012 – 10 August 2022)

Links
- Website: dajto.markiza.sk

Availability

Terrestrial
- DVB-T: MUX 4 (Pay) (SD)

Streaming media
- Archív Markíza: Watch live (Slovak only)
- VOYO: Watch live (Slovak only)

Markíza Dajto is a Slovak television channel. It is the first niche channel aimed at young, active men in Slovakia. The channel, which launched on 20 August 2012, is owned by Central European Media Enterprises and currently has a reach of approximately 90% of the country's 5.4 million people and broadcasts 24 hours per day.

Dajto showcases top foreign series, shows and movies targeted at young male viewers. This includes CME's own regionally produced programs, highly rated European & American series, infotainment shows, as well as a la mode American or European movies. The channel is extending its programming including highly rated foreign titles as well as gradually delivered locally produced content relevant to its audience.

The name of the channel is taken from the Slovak phrase "Daj to", meaning "Give [me] that".

== Television series ==
=== Airing currently ===
- Cobra 11 (all seasons)
- Common Law
- Fringe (seasons 1-3)
- M*A*S*H
- NCIS: Los Angeles (seasons 1-10)
- Nikita (season 1-3)
- Seafarers (all seasons)
- Smallville (season 9)
- Star Trek: The Next Generation (all seasons)
- Walker, Texas Ranger (all seasons)
- Servant of the People

=== Ended ===
- Bionic Woman
- Charlie's Angels
- Chuck (season 2)
- Dark Blue (all seasons)
- Flashpoint (season 1-3)
- Franklin & Bash (all seasons)
- Hex (all seasons)
- Human Target (all seasons)
- Chase
- Inspector Rex (all seasons)
- Jake and the Fatman (all season)
- Las Vegas (season 3-5)
- Lasko - The Fist of God (season 1)
- Last Resort
- Married... with Children (season 1-8)
- Person of Interest (season 1)
- R.I.S. Police Scientifique (seasons 1-5)
- Rockface (all seasons)
- Southland (season 1-2)
- Spartacus: Blood and Sand
- Spartacus: Gods of the Arena
- The Beast
- The Big Bang Theory (season 1)
- The Unusuals
- Tower Prep
- True Justice (season 1)
- V (all seasons)
- XIII: The Series (season 1)

== Documentaries ==
=== Ended ===
- Aftermath: Population Zero
- Super Size Me

== TV shows ==
=== Airing currently ===
- PokerStars Big Game
- Top Gear (all seasons)

=== Ended ===
- Fort Boyard (all seasons of Slovak version)

== Animated series ==
=== Airing currently ===
- The Tom and Jerry Comedy Show (all seasons)
- The Yogi Bear Show (all seasons)
- Transformers: Animated (all seasons)
- Teenage Mutant Ninja Turtles (all seasons)
- X-Men (all seasons)

=== Ended ===
- Duck Dodgers: Attack of the Drones
- Jackie Chan Adventures (all seasons)
- Kung Fu Panda: Legends of Awesomeness (season 1)
- Men in Black: The Series (all seasons)
- SpongeBob SquarePants (season 1-5)
- Scooby-Doo (all seasons)
- Stuart Little: The Animated Series
- The Flintstone Kids (all seasons)
- The Penguins of Madagascar (all seasons)

== Sport events ==
=== Airing currently ===
- 2014-2015 Fortuna Liga (last 5 rounds)
- 2013 Formula One Season (selected races)
- 2014 FIFA World Cup qualification (UEFA) (selected matches)
- Red Bull X-Fighters (selected races)
- WBA (selected fights)

=== Upcoming ===
- UEFA Euro 2024 (all matches)
- UEFA Champions League (all matches)
- UEFA Europa League (all matches)
- UEFA Conference League (all matches)
- UEFA Euro 2028 (all matches)

=== Ended ===
- 2012 European Hockey Trophy
- 2012–13 FA Cup (selected matches)
- 2012–13 UEFA Champions League (selected matches)
- 2013 Wimbledon Championships*
- Bratislava Tennis Classics 2012
