= Jednotka =

Slovak television channel

- Country: Slovakia
- Broadcast area: Slovakia, reaching bordering regions via overspill of the Slovakian terrestrial network
- Headquarters: Bratislava

Programming
- Language: Slovak
- Picture format: 1080i HDTV

Ownership
- Owner: STVR (Slovenská televízia a rozhlas)
- Sister channels: Dvojka; Šport; 24

History
- Launched: 3 November 1956; 70 years ago
- Former names: ČST Bratislava (1956–1970); ČST Bratislava 1 (1970–1990); S1 (1990–1993); STV1 (1993–2004)

Links
- Website: stvr.sk

Availability

Terrestrial
- DVB-T: 3 MUX (SD)/(HD) (FTA)

Streaming media
- RTVS.sk: Watch live (Slovak only)

Jednotka (1 formerly STV1) is a Slovak television generalist channel owned and operated by public broadcasting, state-funded STVR. It was created de jure following the independence of Slovakia, replacing F1.

== Programming ==
=== News and journalism ===
- Góly, body, sekundy (Goals, points, seconds) - sport news
- O 5 minút 12 (5 to 12 (o'clock)) - political debate
- Občan za dverami (Citizen behind the door) - programme about civil law disputes
- Počasie (Weather forecast)
- Ranné správy STVR (STVR Morning news)
- Reportéri (Reporters)
- Slovensko v obrazoch (Slovakia in pictures) - interesting facts about Slovakia
- Správy STVR (STVR News) at 12:00, 16:00 (weekdays), 19:00 (daily)
- Svet v obrazoch (The world in pictures) - interesting facts about the world
- K11 – Kommissare im Einsatz (Die neuen Fälle) - Saturdays, 10:30

=== Entertainment ===
- 5 proti 5 (5 vs 5) - Family Feud franchise
- Boris & Brambor - TV podcast
- Cestou necestou (Road or no road (literally))
- Čo ja viem (What Do I Know)
- Dámsky klub (Women's club) - lifestyle magazine
- Duel - quiz show
- Duel Junior - quiz show
- Folklorika - folklore magazine
- Milujem Slovensko (I love Slovakia) - I Love My Country (TV series) franchise
- Neskoro večer (Late evening) - Late-night talk show
- Postav dom, zasaď strom (Build a house, plant a tree) - hobby, housing and gardening magazine
- Tajomstvo mojej kuchyne (The secret of my kitchen/cuisine)
- Záhady tela (Body mysteries)
- Zem spieva (Land sings) - folklore singing and dancing competition
- Zlaté časy (Golden times)

=== Original series ===
- Doctor Martin - crime/comedy 2015 - 2016
- Hniezdo (The nest) - drama 2020
- Inspector Max - crime/comedy 2018
- Kolonáda (Colonnade) - family drama 2013
- Pumpa (Gas station) - sitcom ongoing
- Strážmajster Topinka (Sergeant Topinka) - crime/comedy 2019
- Tajné životy (Secret Lives) - drama 2015 - 2017

=== Former programming ===
- Apropo TV - Political satire in a form of TV News
- Čierna alebo biela (Black or white)
- Futbal (Football)
- Halušky (Mishmash) - Spitting Image franchise
- Hádaj, kto nás pozval? (Guess, who invited us?)
- Hit Storočia (Hit of the Century)
- Koleso Šťastia (Wheel of Fortune) - Wheel of Fortune franchise
- Milionár (Millionaire) - Who Wants to Be a Millionaire? franchise
- Ranný magazín (Morning magazine)
- Ruku na to (Deal) - Deal or No Deal franchise
- Si v obraze? (Are you in the picture?)
- Slovensko hľadá SuperStar (Slovak Idol) - Pop Idol franchise
- S.O.S.
- Svadba snov (Dream wedding) - Love letters franchise
- Taxík (Taxi) - Cash Cab franchise
- Večer Milana Markoviča - Political satire and debate

=== Foreign series ===
(currently broadcasting)

- Die Bergretter
- Don Matteo
- The District
- Fireman Sam
- Hercule Poirot
- Hudson & Rex
- Lekarze
- Les Chamois
- Spyashchie
- Victoria (British TV series)
- Bluey
- Peppa Pig
- Pingu
- Postman Pat

=== Former broadcasting ===
- 101 Dalmatians: The Series
- Adventures of the Gummi Bears
- American Idol
- Baywatch
- Bob the Builder
- Bolek i Lolek
- Chip n' Dale: Rescue Rangers
- Desperate Housewives
- Der Clown
- DuckTales
- Grisù il draghetto
- Hannah Montana
- House M.D.
- Kim Possible
- Krtek
- Knight Rider
- Law & Order: Special Victims Unit
- Matlock
- Maya the Honey Bee
- Medicopter 117 – Jedes Leben zählt
- Miś Uszatek
- Mount Royal
- Mr. Bean
- Nu, pogodi
- Pat a Mat
- TaleSpin
- Teenage Mutant Ninja Turtles
- The Addams Family
- The Bugs Bunny Show
- The Cosby Show
- The Flintstones
- The Mézga Family
- The Scooby-Doo Show
- The Simpsons
- The Yogi Bear Show
- Thomas & Friends
- Tom and Jerry

== Notable presenters ==
- Petra Ázacis (2008–2011, 2021–present)
- Ľubomír Bajaník (1996–present)
- Viktor Blažek (1996–2002)
- Monika Bruteničová (1996–1999)
- Katarína Brychtová (2004–present)
- Andrej Bičan (2000–2003, 2007–present)
- Andrea Bugošová (1972–1999)
- Veronika Cifrová Ostrihoňová (2021–present)
- Jozef Dúbravský (2007–2008)
- Michal Dyttert (2001–2002)
- Marianna Ďurianová (2000–2001, 2018–present)
- Ľudmila Farkašovská (2004)
- Marcel Forgáč (2002, 2007–2008, 2011–present)
- Lucia Forman Habancová (2007–2012)
- Marián Gáborík (2020–present)
- Oľga Hamadejová (2008–present)
- Alena Heribanová (1979–present)
- Ľuboš Hlavena (2007–present)
- Kveta Horváthová (1995–1996, 2007–2011)
- Michal Hudák (2010–2012)
- Ján Hudok (1994–present)
- Andrea Chabroňová (2000–present)
- Ivan Janda (1992–1996, 2004–2008)
- Erika Judínyová (2000–2005)
- Adriana Kmotríková (1990–2000)
- Peter Kočiš (1995–2004, 2010–present)
- Ján Koleník (2005–2006)
- Rastislav Konečný (2021–present)
- Eugen Korda (2004–2007)
- Kristína Kormúthová (2008–2014)
- Maroš Košík (2008–2010)
- Michal Kovačič (2004–2008)
- Jana Košíková (2011–present)
- Dano Kováč (2011–2013)
- Miloslav Kováč (1993–2006)
- Stanislava Kováčik (2007–2008)
- Jarmila Lajčáková-Hargašová (1995–1996, 2005–present)
- Katrin Lengyelová (2000–2002)
- Richard Lintner (2021–present)
- Jana Majeská (1995–present)
- Peter Marcin (1998–2003, 2009–present)
- Gregor Mareš (1998–2000, 2009–present)
- Ján Mečiar (2004–2008)
- Marcel Merčiak (1997–present)
- Iveta Malachovská (1989–1996, 2006–present)
- Marián Miezga (2017–present)
- Miroslav Michalech (1982–2003)
- Soňa Müllerová (1985–2003, 2008–present)
- Martin Nikodým (1995–1996, 2007–present)
- Mária Ölvedyová (2004–2007)
- Lucia Palšovičová (2007–2013)
- Andrea Pálffy Belányiová (2004–2005)
- Mária Pietrová (2005–2012)
- Ján Plesník (1981–2015)
- Roman Pomajbo (2004–2008)
- Zlatica Puškárová (1997–1999)
- Vladimír Seman (1986–2004)
- Michal Slanička (2003–present)
- Viliam Stankay (1997–present)
- Andrea Stoklasová (1994–1998, 2001–2008)
- Dana Španková Roháčová (2004–2007)
- Janette Štefánková (2006–present)
- Alfonz Šuran (1995–1998, 2022–present)
- Alexander Štefuca (2002–2003, 2005–2008, 2015–2021)
- Andrea Ušiaková (2001–2003)
- Andrea Vadkerti (2004–2011)
- Boris Valábik (2018–present)
- Adela Vinczeová (2002, 2004–present)
- Vladimír Vondrák (2008–2011)
- Vladimír Voštinár (2000–2002)
- Milan Zimnýkoval (2006–present)
- Natália Žembová (2006–2014)

== Logos and identities ==
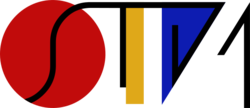
Jednotka's logo from 1993 to 1996

Jednotka's logo from 1996 to 1999

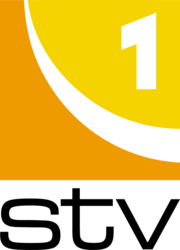
Jednotka's logo from 1999 to 2001

Jednotka's logo from 2001 to 2004

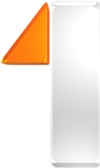
Jednotka's logo from 2004 to 2012

Jednotka's logo from 2012 to 2026
