= Rádio Košice =

- Košice; Slovakia
- Frequencies: 91.7 MHz (Košice - city); 106.9 MHz (Košice - surrounding areas); 90.4 MHz (Prešov); 90.8 MHz (Šariš - Sabinov); 92.6 MHz (Spiš - Levoča); 102.0 MHz (Gemer - Rožňava); 97.0 MHz (Zemplín - Strážske); 102.7 MHz (Zemplín - Michalovce); 91.0 MHz (Zemplín - Trebišov); 91.7 MHz (Tatry - Poprad); 95.9 MHz (Liptov - Liptovský Mikuláš)

Ownership
- Owner: MARK MEDIA s.r.o.

History
- First air date: 2007

Links
- Website: https://www.radiokosice.sk/

Rádio Košice is a commercial radio station broadcasting from Košice for a large part of eastern Slovakia. The station's format is AOR (adult oriented radio), aimed at active listeners under the age of 59.

== Broadcast ==
The information and music station started broadcasting on July 7, 2007, from the transmitter in Košice. Its priority is to be a quality metropolitan radio. Gradually, its broadcasting has spread to a large part of the region, and in addition to twelve low-power transmitters, it can be listened to on the Internet and satellite.

Radio Košice broadcasting is divided into several blocks:

- Morning block - brings information service, notice for the current day, weather and transport information
- Daily block - forms a musical backdrop with news inputs
- Afternoon block - offers metropolitan news, interesting topics and interviews
- Evening and night block - leisure broadcast
- Weekend broadcast - creates a stream of music with regular news blocks

Among the portals belonging to Rádio Košice is also TV KOŠICE, which enriches the sound with an image. Information that is broadcast in this regional unit can also be found on the KOŠICE ONLINE website.
