= Rádio BETA =

Bojnice; Slovakia
- Frequencies: 93,9 MHz (Lehota pod Vtáčnikom); 104,3 MHz (Trenčín); 102,00 MHz (Handlová)

Programming
- Format: Regional

Ownership
- Owner: Štefan Kurušta

History
- First air date: 1995

Links
- Website: https://beta.sk/

Rádio BETA is a private Slovak independent regional radio operating in 1995 in Upper Nitra county. It broadcasts via three of its own transmitters.

== Broadcast ==
Being a regional radio station, it broadcasts news and current affairs from the whole of our Upper Nitra county as well as the Trenčín Region as their priority broadcast.

The program structure and individual sessions are aimed at addressing all age categories.

Beta Rádio is a local radio station, operating since 1995 from Bojnice. It covers the area of Upper Nitra and Trenčín, However, it is possible to listen to it anywhere through the online stream or mobile apps. The program is designed to appeal to all ages. This explains the slogan of the radio, which is: "Radio for the whole family" The broadcast also includes moderated programs and news and various information from the region.

== Listenership ==
With a listenership of 0.6% in 2015, Rádio Beta was the thirteenth most listened radio station in Slovakia and the most listened to regional station according to the Market & Media & Lifestyle survey of Median SK (2 + 3 Q / 2015)
