= WRN Broadcast =

International broadcast services company

WRN Broadcast, formerly known as World Radio Network, is an international broadcast services company based in the United Kingdom that works with television channels and radio broadcasters, media owners and brands enabling them to deliver content to target audiences worldwide.

WRN Broadcast has developed since 1992 when it was founded as an international radio distribution company known as World Radio Network, which redistributed news and information programmes produced by various international public radio networks.

== History ==
Following its acquisition of TSI Broadcast in April 2009, the company expanded its offering to become a comprehensive global broadcast services provider working across traditional and digital platforms to supply television and radio clients with worldwide coverage and managed services.

Clients include Top Up TV and Wananchi Group Holdings. WRN Broadcast also works with MUTV, Jazz FM and Voice of America.

WRN Broadcast Limited was acquired by Babcock International Group plc in March 2015, which was in turn acquired by managed services company Encompass in September 2018.

== List of relayed stations in English ==
The World Radio Network channels in English, Russian, Arabic, and Persian can be received from direct-to-home satellite, cable TV, internet audio streams, local affiliates as well as via the TuneIn app available on iOS and Android.

English channel operates different programming schedules for Europe, North America and listeners in Africa and Asia.

- Banns Radio International (Denmark)
- Democracy Now!
- Deutsche Welle
- Israel Radio International
- KBS World Radio
- Radio Poland
- Radio Guangdong
- NHK World Radio Japan
- Radio Prague
- Radio Slovakia International
- RTÉ Ireland
- Vatican Radio
- World of Radio

== List of relayed stations in Russian ==
- United Nations Radio
- Radio Prague International
- Radio Exterior d'España
- Russian Radio Australia
- Radio Slovakia International
- KBS World Radio
- BBC World Service
