= TV Fooor =

Comedy-focused TV channel in Slovakia

Fooor
- Country: Slovakia
- Broadcast area: Slovakia
- Headquarters: Záhorská Bystrica, Bratislava

Programming
- Language(s): Slovak
- Picture format: 16:9 (576i, SDTV)

Ownership
- Owner: Central European Media Enterprises
- Sister channels: Markíza, TV Doma, TV Dajto

History
- Launched: 25 February 2013
- Closed: 31 December 2013

Links
- Website: fooor.sk

Fooor was a Slovak television channel. It was the first niche channel aimed at comedy programs in Slovakia. The channel, which was launched on 25 February 2013, was owned by Central European Media Enterprises and had a reach of approximately 90% of the country's 5.4 million people. It was broadcasting 24 hours per day by the time it closed.

Fooor showcased top foreign comedy series, sitcoms, shows and movies targeted at young viewers. This includes CME's own regionally produced programs, highly rated European and American series, shows and sitcoms as well as a la mode American or European movies.

The channel extended its programming including highly rated foreign titles as well as gradually delivered locally produced content relevant to its audience.

Fooor ceased to broadcast on 31 December 2013 (New Year's Eve). Several of the comedy serials that were shown on Fooor have been moved to its sister channels Dajto and Doma.

== TV series ==
- Better with You (all season)
- Community (all seasons)
- Friends (all seasons)
- Frasier (all seasons)
- Joey (all seasons)
- Mad Love
- Married... with Children (all seasons)
- Sabrina, the Teenage Witch (all seasons)
- The Middle (season 1-3)
- 'Til Death (all season)
- Veronica's Closet (all season)
- Black Barons (all seasons)
- Drop Dead Diva (season 1-2)
- Chuck (season 3-5)
- Lucky Luke
- Mike & Molly (season 1-2)
- $#*! My Dad Says
- Trust Me

== TV shows ==
- Betty White's Off Their Rockers (season 1-2)
- Tele Tele (all seasons)
