= Šport (TV channel) =

- Country: Slovakia
- Broadcast area: Slovakia, reaching bordering regions via overspill of the Slovakian terrestrial network
- Headquarters: Bratislava

Programming
- Language: Slovak
- Picture format: 1080i HDTV

Ownership
- Owner: STVR (Slovenská televízia a rozhlas)
- Sister channels: Jednotka; Dvojka; 24

History
- Launched: 20 December 2021; 4 years ago

Links
- Website: stvr.sk

Availability

Streaming media
- RTVS.sk: Watch live (Slovak only)

Šport is a Slovak sports channel owned and operated by STVR, Slovakia's state-funded public broadcaster. The channel started broadcasting on 20 December 2021, ten years after the closure of its first sports channel Trojka.

== History ==
STVR predecessor STV had a previous attempt at a sports channel, Trojka, whose broadcasts started on 8 August 2008 and ended on 31 May 2011 due to lack of budget.

A relaunch of the sports channel was considered for 2020, but once the Olympics were delayed as a result of the pandemic, the channel was delayed numerous times. Initially, it was considered that the channel would conduct test transmissions between 17 and 20 May 2021, having informed subscription television operators on the subject.

On 25 November 2021, RTVS announced the relaunch of a sports channel, this time under the new name Šport, for a 20 December launch. It planned to air 3,600 hours of sporting events it had the rights to during the 2022 calendar year. The channel also planned the inclusion of healthy lifestyle programmes and documentaries on Slovak sporting legends. The channel's operating budget at launch was worth €11 million.

== Logos and identities ==
Šport logo from 2021 to 2026
