= JOJ Plus (Slovak TV channel) =

Slovak television channel

- Country: Slovakia
- Broadcast area: Slovakia; Czech Republic
- Headquarters: Bratislava

Programming
- Language: Slovak
- Picture format: 576i (SDTV); 1080i (HDTV)

Ownership
- Owner: JOJ Group (J&T Media Enterprises)
- Sister channels: TV JOJ; JOJ Krimi; JOJ Cinema; Jojko; JOJ Šport; JOJ Šport 2 JOJ 24; JOJ Svet; JOJ Family

History
- Launched: 5 October 2008
- Former names: Plus (2011–2020)

Links
- Website: plus.joj.sk

Availability

Terrestrial
- DVB-T: MUX 2 (FTA) (SD)

Streaming media
- JOJ.sk: Watch live (Slovak only)

JOJ Plus is a Slovak television channel owned by J&T Media Enterprises. It is the sister channel of TV JOJ. The channel was launched on 5 October 2008 at 19:55 (7:55 PM). The channel broadcasts content that was shown on TV JOJ.

== US TV series broadcast on Joj Plus ==
Series	Slovak title	Latest season	Timeslot	Status	Resolution
America's Got Talent	Amerika má talent	6	Friday & Saturday 8:15-9:15 PM	live episodes unaired	576i (SDTV)
The X Factor	X Factor	1	Friday 8:15-10:15 PM (performance show), 10:15-11:00 PM (results show)	new episodes on TV JOJ	576i (SDTV)
Fear Factor	Faktor Strachu	4	Weekdays 9:10-10:00 PM		576i (SDTV)
Dexter	Dexter	4	Monday 11:45 PM–12:40 AM		576i (HDTV)
Walking Dead	Walking Dead	3	Wednesday 10:00-11:00 PM		576i (SDTV)
Futurama	Futurama	6	Monday-Friday 7:45-8:15 PM	hiatus	576i (SDTV)
The Simpsons	Simpsonovci	23	Monday-Friday 3:50-4:45 PM	reruns	576i (SDTV)
Family Guy	Griffinovci	6	Monday-Friday 9:15-10:05 AM	reruns	576i (SDTV)
How I Met Your Mother	Ako som spoznal vašu mamu	4	Weekdays 4:00-4:30 PM	reruns	576i (SDTV)
The X-Files	Akty X	4	Weekdays 6:45-7:45 PM	hiatus	576i (SDTV)
Leverage	Podvodníci	2	Monday (2-hour) 10:00-11:45 PM		576i (SDTV)
MTV Cribs	Cribs	1	Weekdays 4:30-5:10 PM		576i (SDTV)
My Name Is Earl	Volajú ma Earl	4	Saturday 10:30-11:30 AM	finished	576i (SDTV)
Wizards of Waverly Place	Kúzelníci z Waverly	2	Weekdays 4:00-4:30 PM	canceled	576i (SDTV)

== British TV series broadcast on Joj Plus ==
Series	Slovak Title	Status	Resolution
Mr. Bean	Mr. Bean	finished	1080i (HDTV)
Ramsay's Kitchen Nightmares	Áno, šéfe! Veľká Británia	finished	1080i (HDTV)
The X Factor	X Factor Veľká Británia		1080i (HDTV)
