= Slovak Radio Building =

Inverted pyramid-shaped concert hall & broadcasting center

- Budova Slovenského rozhlasu (Slovak)
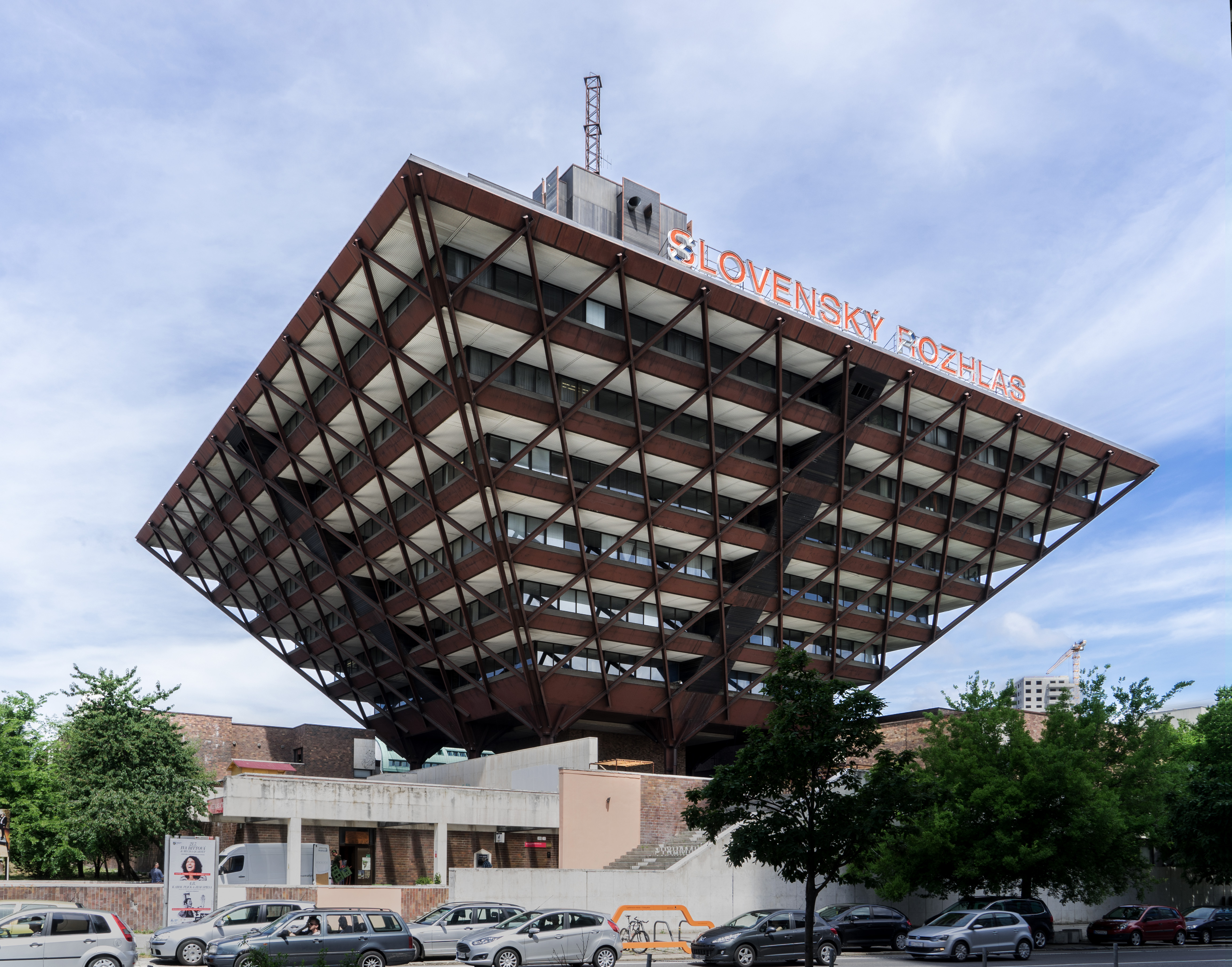
- Interactive map of the Slovak Radio Building area

General information
- Type: Buildings
- Location: Old Town, Bratislava, Slovakia, Slovakia
- Coordinates: 48°9′15″N 17°6′51″E
- Opened: 1967–1983

The Slovak Radio Building (Slovak: Budova Slovenského rozhlasu) is located in Bratislava, Slovakia.

It is shaped like an upside down pyramid. Locals also refer to it as the Radio Diamant. Architects of this project were Štefan Svetko, Štefan Ďurkovič and Barnabáš Kissling and it was completed in 1983. The project began in 1967. The building is 80 metres high and has a 522-seat concert hall with a large concert organ. The first test broadcast was made in 1984 and regular broadcasting began on 27 March 1985. The building currently serves as the radio headquarters of Slovak Television and Radio (STVR).

== Architecture ==
The Slovak Radio Building belongs to one of Bratislava's architectural landmarks. It was constructed at a time when socialist realism was the official architectural style in Czechoslovakia. Nonetheless, the architects were afforded considerable leeway to experiment with the design of the building. One of the architects, Štefan Svetko, later observed that "during those years, architecture began to escape ideology, the stupidity of prefabricated blocks, and continued the pre-war tradition when we made good buildings comparable with developments elsewhere in the world".

The architects were originally selected through a competition that took place in 1963. Although the competition was won by Miloš Chorvát, the investor opted for the second-placed design by Štefan Svetko, Štefan Ďurkovič and Barnabáš Kissling. The authors consciously sought to avoid replicating the predominant style of tall buildings at the time, which combined a low block with a tall office tower. The building was instead meant to be more expressive and carry a distinctive style. Štefan Svetko was known to refer to the design as a "temple of word and music".

The Slovak Radio Building was one of the first major buildings in Slovakia utilizing a steel frame instead of prefabricated concrete panels which were ubiquitous at the time. However, the lack of experience with steel negatively impacted the construction of the building.

While nowadays the building is located in the broader center of Bratislava, the location was peripheral at the time of its conception.

== Reception ==
The Slovak Radio Building has divided public opinion ever since its unveiling. While some architects consider it one of the country's most important buildings conversant with contemporary architectural styles in the world, others consider it ugly and synonymous with the Communist era.

The Telegraph included the building in a list of the 30 ugliest buildings in the world, but this choice was criticized by a number of architects.

In 2017, the building was declared a cultural heritage monument in Slovakia.

== In popular culture ==
The exterior of the building was a filming location for the 2018 spy thriller film Red Sparrow. The radio station in the video game Workers & Resources: Soviet Republic is modeled after the Slovak Radio Building.

== See also ==
- Slovak Television and Radio
