= Rádio FM =

- Slovakia
- Frequency: See § Frequencies

Programming
- Format: Alternative/Indie music

Ownership
- Owner: Slovak Television and Radio

History
- First air date: 4 March 1991; 35 years ago
- Former names: Rock FM Rádio (1991–2004)

Links
- Webcast: RTVS Player

Rádio FM (styled Rádio_FM) is the fourth channel of the public Slovak Radio. It is an alternative music radio and was originally created on 4 March 1991 under the name Rock FM Radio.

Rádio FM began with the tradition of awarding Radio Head Awards. Its listeners chose the best Slovak album, Single of the Year, Newcomer of the Year and Best live act of the Year and another prize is awarded also by professional music critics made up of Rádio FM and partner media editors. Rádio FM programs aim to discover, highlight and promote music by artists who do not receive air time on the commercial broadcasters.

== History ==
The history of this radio station goes back to 5 January 1987, when Radio Elán was launched. On 4 September 1988, as a result of the merger of Rádia Elán and the Czech Mikrofórum, the E + M program was created, which lasted until 31 December 1990. On 4 March 1991, Rock FM Rádio was established. It was the first radio in Slovakia to start 24-hour broadcasting. On 3 November 2004, the station changed its name to Rádio_FM.

It was the ninth most listened radio station in Slovakia in the 2nd and 3rd quarters of 2017, with a listening rate of 2.56%, according to the Market & Media & Lifestyle survey by Median SK.

== Programming ==
The specific feature of Rádio FM is its focus on young listeners who avoid consumer musical production and are interested in alternative music genres such as indie rock, dubstep, hip-hop, world music, drum and bass, UK grime, metal, dance electronic music, R&B and so on. The radio also broadcasts radio coverage from festivals, live 'unplugged' performances and concerts. They have also broadcast the final of the Eurovision Song Contest since Slovakia's withdrawal from the contest in 2013.

=== Radio Head Awards ===
Rádio FM began the tradition of awarding "radio heads" in 2009 when its listeners chose the best Slovak album of the year and another prize was awarded also by professional music critics. In the same year, the fourth channel of Slovak Radio introduced also a visual aspect by awarding statuettes. It was a tradition that the winners get a piece of work created by the artist Bety K. Majerníkova – a statuette with radio instead of the head. On 6 February 2009, the electro band Noisecut became the first winner of the Radio_Head Awards for the album Bliiizko and songwriter Ján Boleslav Kladivo received the critics' choice award for his album Rozhľadňa.

The attractiveness of music awards and their increasing popularity brought some significant changes into the second edition. Next Radio_Head Awards brought three new categories added to the original award for Album of the Year and Album of the Year/Critics choice. In two voting rounds the listeners chose their favorites in the new categories Single of the Year, Newcomer of the Year and Best live act. Vetroplach and young band Billy Barman were the winners of the second edition and the main award went to the band Diego for their album Peripheries. The critics´ choice went to the electronic project The Autumnist. The gala evening was hosted by the moderators Baláž and Hubinák from the most favourite show of Rádio FM and ten bands performed live on stage.

The third edition of Radio_Head Awards took place on 18 February 2011 in public.

== Media ==
Rádio FM is one of the pioneers in podcasting technology and mobile phone applications on the Slovak media market and also makes strong use of the potential of social network communities such as Facebook or Twitter.

== Frequencies ==
Town	Transmitter	Frequency	ERP	Notes
Zvolen	Malá Stráž	89,0 MHz	1 kW	
Bratislava	Kamzík	89,3 MHz	10 kW	
Dolný Kubín	Veľký Bysterec	91,7 MHz	0.5 kW	
Čadca	Jurošovský vrch	91,8 MHz	0.5 kW	
Martin	Hrádok	91,8 MHz	0.5 kW	
Námestovo	Magurka	91,9 MHz	10 kW	
Žilina	Dubeň	91,9 MHz	0.5 kW	
Lučenec	Blatný vrch	98,0 MHz	10 kW	18:00–6:00 h.
Modrý Kameň	Španí Laz	98,3 MHz	10 kW	18:00–6:00 h.
Žiar nad Hronom	Šibeničný vrch	98,4 MHz	0.5 kW	
Stará Ľubovňa	Kotník	98,9 MHz	10 kW	
Košice	Werferova	101,2 MHz	1 kW	
Trenčín	Nad Oborou	101,2 MHz	10 kW	
Trebišov	Bánovce nad Ondavou	101,3 MHz	10 kW	
Prešov	Šibená hora	101,5 MHz	0.5 kW	
Bardejov	Stebnícka Magura	101,7 MHz	10 kW	
Ružomberok	Úložisko	102,1 MHz	5 kW	
Borský Mikuláš	Dubník	102,8 MHz	1 kW	
Nové Zámky	Tehlové - Tekvičné pole	102,8 MHz	1 kW	
Štúrovo	Modrý vrch	103,7 MHz	10 kW	
Poprad	Kráľova hoľa	104,3 MHz	30 kW	
Banská Bystrica	Laskomer	105,4 MHz	2 kW	
Rožňava	Dievčenská skala	105,9 MHz	1 kW	18:00–6:00 h.
Snina	Magurica	107,6 MHz	10 kW	

Frequencies with limited hours of operations noted above are used for Hungarian-language Radio Patria service at other times.

Also available on satellite:

- Astra 3B, position: 23,5° E, frequency: 11836/H, SR: 27500, FEC: 5/6, standard: DVB-S, encryption: none

== See also ==
- Radio Slovakia International
