= Slovenská televízia =

Former state-owned public television organization in Slovakia

- Logo used since May 2026

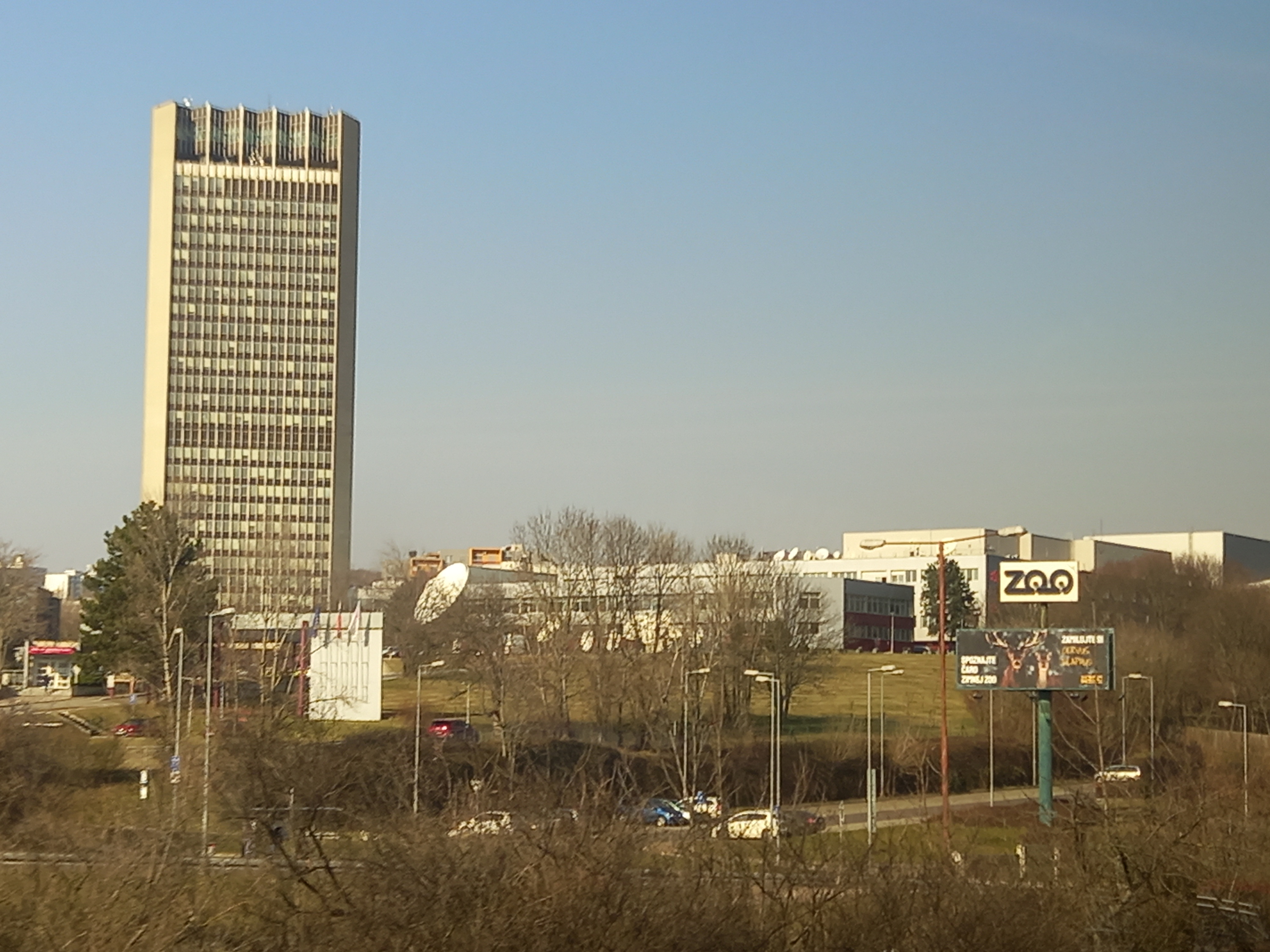
- Slovak TV's headquarters in Bratislava in 2023
- Type: Broadcast television
- Country: Slovakia
- Availability: terrestrial, cable, satellite
- Headquarters: Slovak Television Building, Bratislava
- Owner: Government of Slovakia
- Launch date: 1991 (by law); 1993 (de facto); May 4, 2026 (2 months ago (relaunch))
- Dissolved: 1 January 2011 (merged into RTVS)
- Replaced: Czechoslovak Television (ČST)
- Replaced by: Radio and Television of Slovakia (RTVS)

Slovenská televízia (Slovak pronunciation: [ˈslɔʋenskaː ˈteleʋiːzɪɐ]; "Slovak Television"; STV) was a state-owned public television organisation in Slovakia. It was created in 1991 as the Slovak part of the former Czechoslovak Television and was headquartered in Bratislava. It was funded from a combination of television licence fees, advertising, and government funding. It ceased to existed on 1 January 2011, when it was merged with the state-owned public radio organisation Slovenský rozhlas ("Slovak Radio") to create Rozhlas a televízia Slovenska ("Radio and Television of Slovakia"). STV was a member of the European Broadcasting Union.

== History ==
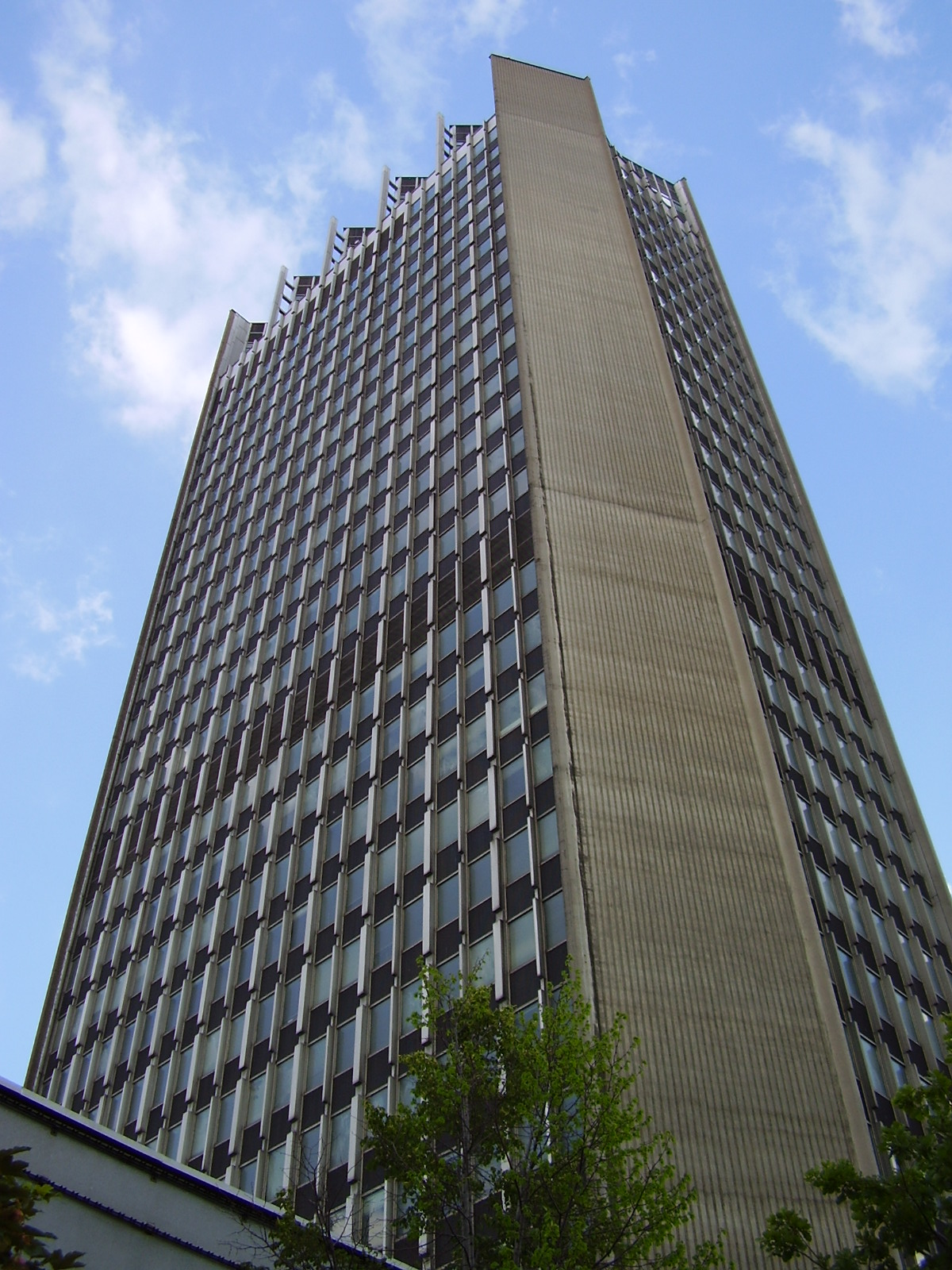
Former headquarters of the organization, the Slovakia Television Building

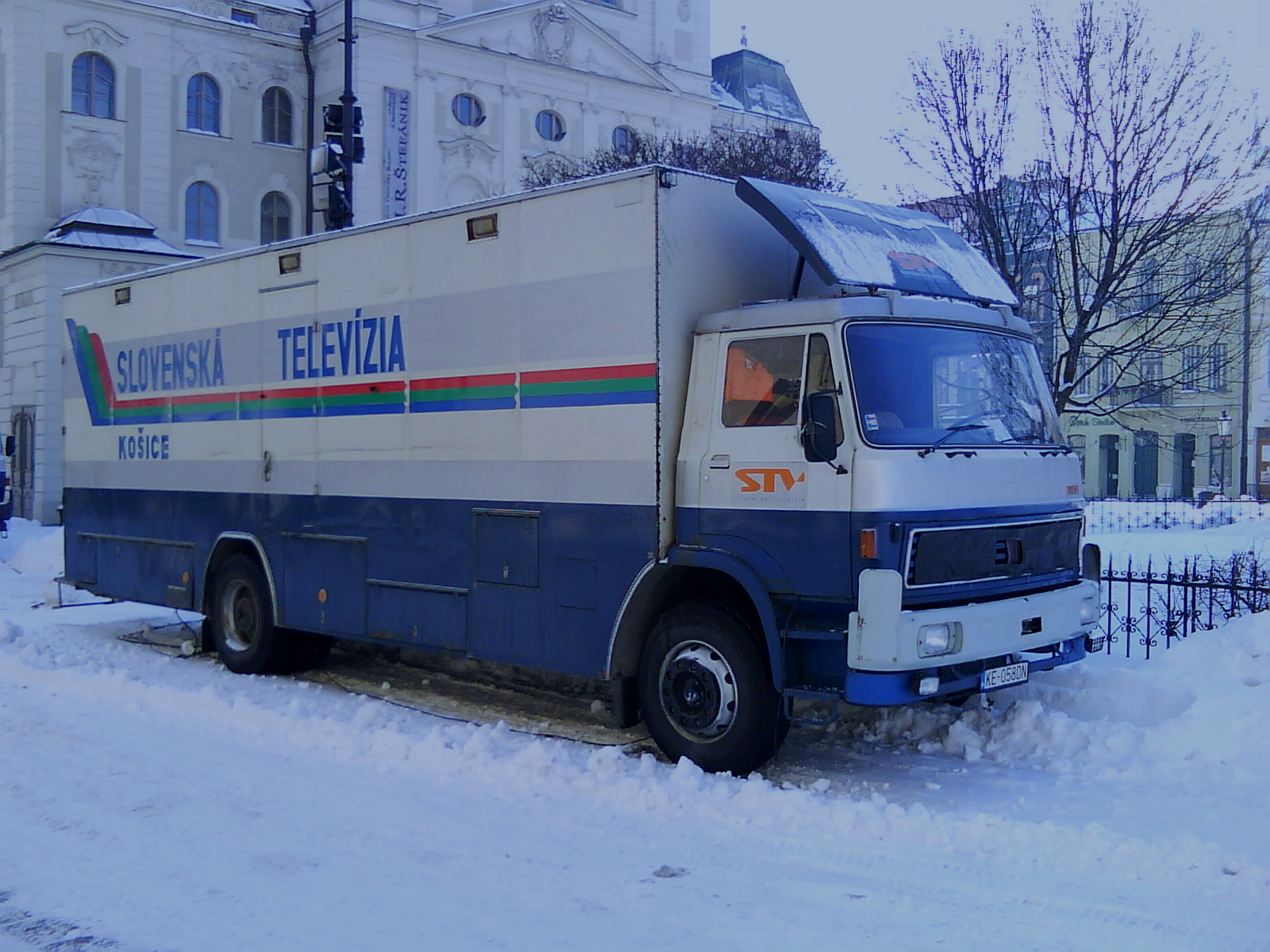
STV outside broadcasting van at Main Street, Košice (2010)

The establishment of STV as an independent institution happened on 1 July 1991, after a law by the Slovak National Council related to the independence of Slovakia from Czechoslovakia. However, its history dates back to November 1956, when Czechoslovak Television, then under socialist regime, established a television studio in Bratislava as a test transmission. Regular broadcasts began on 3 November 1957, broadcasting daily except Monday (as it was customary in Eastern Bloc television broadcasts). After the fall of communism in the Czechoslovak Republic, programming began to be relaunched, and the Bratislava studio was renamed as Slovenská televízia in preparation for the Slovak independence. In September 1990, as part of a massive reorganisation of the CST channels, the second program was repositioned as a separate service for the Slovak side of the country, under the S1 name (the Czech side received its own separate service, ČTV). A third channel, OK 3, focusing on international satellite programming, launched on May of the same year, but it was replaced by a similarly focused Slovakia-specific service, TA3, in July 1991.

After Slovak independence, on 1 January 1993, the management and operations of the Slovak television were fully separated from the Czech Television, and the newly-formed Slovenská televízia began operating two channels. Still, the complex social and political issues that hampered Slovakia after independence, as well as heavy turnover of management, a lack of clear identification between both programs, and heavy bias toward the towards the People's Party – Movement for a Democratic Slovakia during the Vladimír Mečiar government, caused the broadcaster to rapidly lose most of its audience, as well as its credibility. The arrival of commercial channels Markíza and TV JOJ, which offered more attractive programming, worsened the decline.

In 2003, founding TV JOJ director Richard Rybníček was elected by the STV Board of Governors as the broadcaster's director general. He swiftly began a transformation process to make public television more competitive with private broadcasters. On the evening of 1 January 2004, STV relaunched both channels with new programming and new brand identities, after a massive promotional campaign anticipating a "new beginning" for public broadcasting. STV1, now renamed as Jednotka, was repositioned as a generalist and mass audience channel, with a focus on light entertainment and increased news programming. STV2 (renamed Dvojka) became a niche-focused service, with most cultural, sports and minority/regional programming moved to this channel. The entire Slovak TV brand was renewed, with new logos, graphic packages and a new look for STV's news programmes, including a new virtual studio. Moreover, the DOGs of both channels moved to the top-right corner of the screen (as opposed to the top-left corner, standardised for most Slovak TV channels), and in-vision continuity was dropped in favour of shorter and snappier promos.

Soon, however, critics began to worry about the quality of most new programming, and many were hampered by the oversaturation of more commercially focused programmes. Adaptations of international franchises, like Pop Idol and C'è posta per te, became heavily criticised due to its high production costs and led to heavy accusations of dumbing down; additionally, internally-produced programming was limited during the Rybníček directorate, and the majority of international TV shows and films (mostly American) were broadcast with Czech dubbing. The few exports broadcast with Slovak dubbing were produced by external studios and were of poor quality, resulting on backlash; by 2007, the Slovak government (then under Robert Fico) duly approved a new law regulating Slovak dubbing on imports. Since then, most Slovak dubbing has been handled by STV's internal dubbing studio.

Even with the heavy drift on the programming concept of Slovak television, the changes were initially successful. During the first days of the relaunch, audiences for both channels did increase to a combined 30.2 per cent share, and soon, Jednotka had engaged in three-way race with Markíza and a resurgent TV JOJ, which had strengthened its programming concept. Alongside the record ratings, STV had successfully reduced part of its heavy debts. However, Rybníček's sudden resignation in 2006 to pursue a political career led to more turnover at the director general position and caused fortunes to be reversed; additionally, the commercially focused programmes introduced under Rybníček moved to its commercial rivals.

Nevertheless, STV embraced the launch of digital television, and, by 2007, some of the programmes broadcast on Jednotka and Dvojka were already broadcast in 16:9, specially imports and many live events; it even launched a third channel dedicated exclusively to sports, Trojka, on 8 August 2008. The launch coincided with the beginning of the 2008 Summer Olympics, and caused all sports programming to move exclusively to this channel, exclusive to digital television.

However, the transition to digital broadcasting and the launch of the third channel, as well as the continuing turnover of management, resulted on heavily increasing debts, which worsened the crisis at the public broadcaster. As a parliamentary response to these debts, STV was eventually forced to merge with its radio counterpart, Slovenský rozhlas, to form the new Radio and Television of Slovakia (RTVS). The merger was completed on 1 January 2011, and, although both companies legally ceased to exist, STV continued broadcasting both channels under the pre-merger brand until a massive relaunch in June, when Trojka ceased to exist and both Jednotka and Dvojka relaunched under the new RTVS brand.

== Television channels ==
STV operated three channels during its existence. They were named Jednotka (One), Dvojka (Two) (called STV1 and STV2 before a name change in 2004), and Trojka (Three), a sports channel launched in 2008.

TA3 was a TV channel previously broadcast on the 3rd broadcasting circuit in the Slovak Republic from 6 July 1991 to 30 September 1992. The channel was created in order to replace the federal channel OK 3.

Trojka ceased broadcasting on 30 June 2011, while the other two channels continued to operate as a part of Rozhlas a televízia Slovenska. The three channels covered the entire territory of Slovakia. Broadcasting was on a 24-hour basis. Between 1987 and 1994, it was limited from 06:00 to 01:30.

== Logos and identities ==
=== STV channels ===
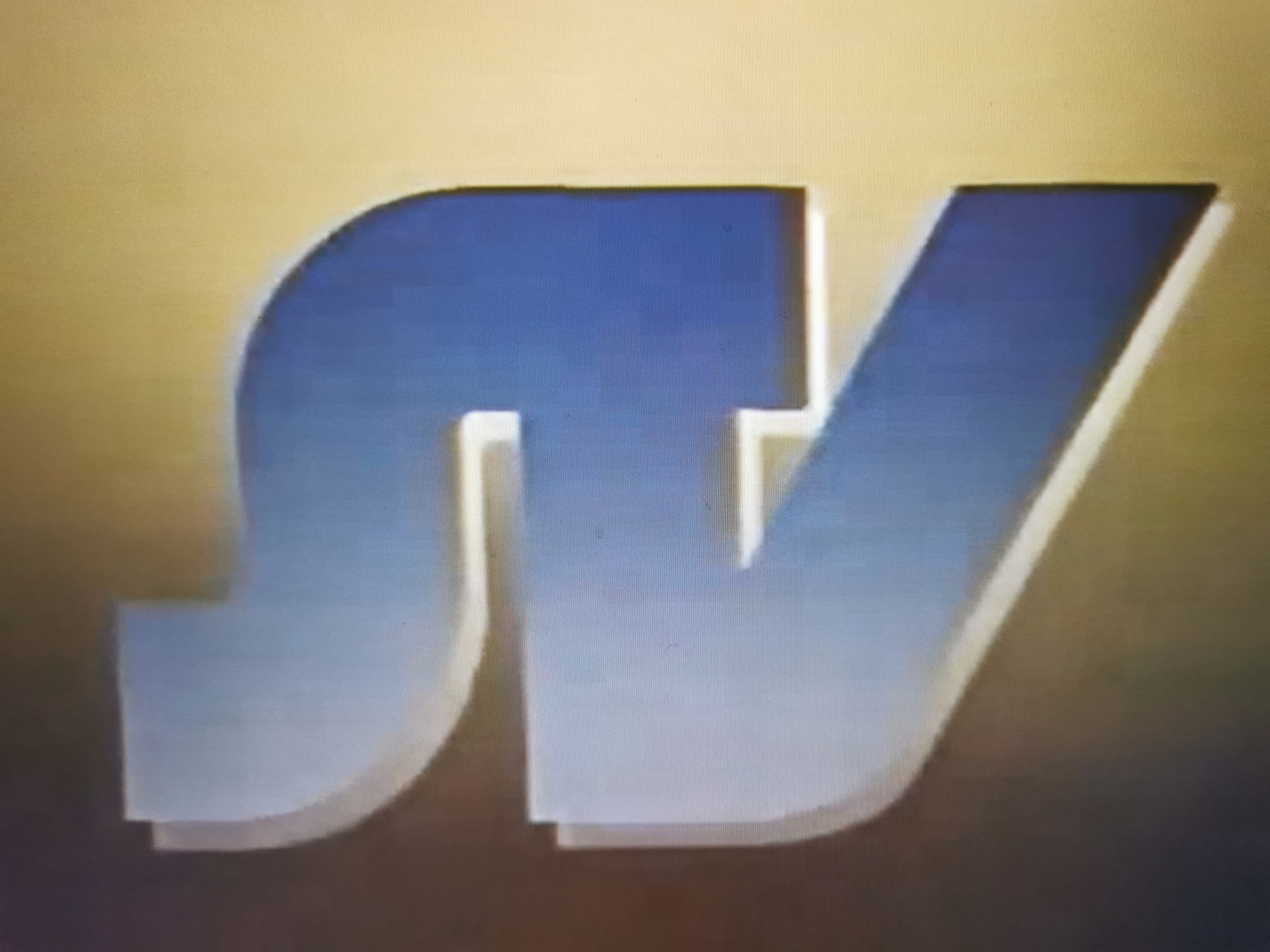
STV logo
(1991–1992)

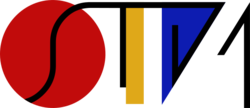
STV1 logo
(1993–1996)

STV1 logo
(1996–1999)

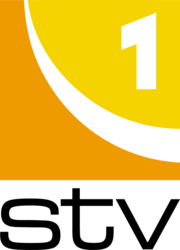
STV1 logo
(1999–2001)

STV1 logo
(2001–2004)

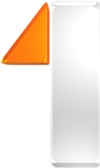
Logo of Jednotka
(2004–2012)

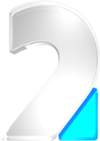
Logo of Dvojka
(2004–2012)

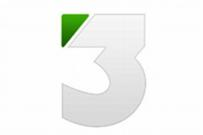
Logo of Trojka
(2004–2012)

== See also ==
- Radio and Television Slovakia
- List of Slovak language television channels
- Mass media in Communist Czechoslovakia
