= Fun Rádio =

- Slovakia
- Frequency: varies by area

Programming
- Format: Contemporary R&B; Rhythm and blues Dance music Electro music House music

Ownership
- Owner: Boris Kollár

History
- First air date: June 10, 1990

Links
- Website: www.funradio.sk

Fun Rádio is a commercial radio station in Slovakia.

== Broadcast ==
Fun Radio started to broadcast in Slovakia in June 1990. Initially it broadcast for four hours daily, the rest of the content was taken from the French Fun Radio. Later, the broadcast on its own slowly increased until it was finally covered for 24 hours a day. Format of the radio is European Hit Radio with its target group being young and progressive listeners. For a long time, it based its content on entertaining broadcasts but since 2007 the majority of its content is not moderated by speakers. What is being moderated by speakers is the morning show, afternoon show and most of its weekend broadcasts.

The radio broadcasts on 17 terrestrial transmitters, internet, satellite and cable distribution. Fun Radio offers multiple of its original streams, podcasts and videos. Three of its actual streams are themed in: 80's and 90's hits, second in Slovak and Czech music (CZSK) and the third is dance music (Dance). Before the Christmas season, they start to broadcast their Christmas stream.

== Frequencies ==
- 94.3 MHz (Bratislava)
- 87.7 MHz (Košice - Dubník)
- 102.9 MHz (Košice - city)
- 104.0 MHz (Banská Bystrica)
- 99.2 MHz (Žilina)
- 89.1 MHz (Trenčín)
- 94.0 MHz (Nitra)
- 102.5 MHz (Poprad)
- 89.2 MHz (Ružomberok)
- 91.6 MHz (Lučenec)
- 93.2 MHz (Tornaľa)
- 95.0 MHz (Liptovský Mikuláš)
- 102.8 MHz (Rožňava)
- 102.8 MHz (Bardejov)
- 104.0 MHz (Senica)
- 106.3 MHz (Považská Bystrica)
- 107.1 MHz (Levice)

== Audience ==
Fun Rádio is the second most popular radio station in Slovakia as of 2026.
