= 24 (Slovak TV channel) =

Slovak news channel

- Country: Slovakia
- Broadcast area: Slovakia, reaching bordering regions via overspill of the Slovakian terrestrial network
- Headquarters: Bratislava

Programming
- Language: Slovak
- Picture format: 1080i HDTV

Ownership
- Owner: STVR (Slovenská televízia a rozhlas)
- Sister channels: Jednotka; Dvojka; Šport

History
- Launched: 28 February 2022; 4 years ago

Links
- Website: stvr.sk

Availability

Streaming media
- RTVS.sk: Watch live (Slovak only)

24 is a Slovak news channel owned and operated by STVR, Slovakia's state-funded public broadcaster.

== History ==
The channel was created in response to RTVS's allegations in being the last among the Slovak media outlets to cover the start of the Russian invasion of Ukraine, putting its role as a public institution in jeopardy. The commercial channels (Markíza, Joj and TA3) were the first to cover the outbreak of the war, at 6am, while RTVS's channels only covered at around 7:30am. By 6pm, Jednotka was not airing rolling news of the conflict, without adding a mere text bar to deliver basic information. This prompted the corporation to announce over the weekend that 24 would start broadcasts on 28 February, and would become the second Slovak news channel, pushing its launch less than two years in advance, as it was initially scheduled for autumn 2023.

The channel started broadcasting at 6am on 28 February 2022, using Trojka's channel capacity, initially for a two-week period. Given that the launch was hurried as a result of the war, it did not prepare its own graphics due to lack of time. The classic Jednotka newscasts (7:30am, 12pm, 4pm and 7pm) were shown in simulcast with the main channel; content also included Dvojka's newscasts in minority languages, including the Hungarian service. However, due to the development of the war, RTVS changed its plans and made 24 definitive, becoming its fifth channel, enabling Trojka to resume its normal operations. For this end, a permanent license was requested in late March. This development also influenced Joj to launch its Joj 24 channel, which had its trademark registered in 2017. With Trojka's closure on 1 December 2022, it became the third channel.

== Logos and identities ==
RTVS/STVR 24 logo from 2022 to 2026
