= Dvojka =

Slovak television channel

- Country: Slovakia
- Broadcast area: Slovakia, reaching bordering regions via overspill of the Slovakian terrestrial network
- Headquarters: Bratislava

Programming
- Languages: Slovak; Other language minorities in Slovakia
- Picture format: 1080i HDTV

Ownership
- Owner: STVR (Slovenská televízia a rozhlas)
- Sister channels: Jednotka; Šport; 24

History
- Launched: 10 May 1970; 56 years ago
- Former names: ČST Bratislava 2 (1970–1990); STV (1990–1993); STV2 (1993–2004)

Links
- Website: stvr.sk

Availability

Terrestrial
- DVB-T: 3 MUX (SD)/(HD) (FTA)

Streaming media
- RTVS.sk: Watch live (Slovak only)

Dvojka (2 formerly STV2) is a Slovak television generalist channel owned and operated by public broadcasting, state-funded STVR.

== History ==
In 1970, Czechoslovak Television launched its second network. While in theory it was a single channel for all of Czechoslovakia, in practice, there were two versions of the same channel, one for the Czech side and one for the Slovak side. Changes in September 1990 led to the old second channel being dismantled and replaced by separate networks: the Czech ČTV and the Slovak S1.

Upon the independence of Slovakia and the creation of Slovak Television, the main channel moved to STV1 (F1 had become more "federalized" starting in 1990). STV was embroiled in a series of administrative changes, and one of the proposals in 1996 was to privatize the second network and move it entirely to cable and satellite television. A government-friendly bidder, PRO TV, won the license in June 1997, but on June 26, the government passed a law halting its privatization.

In accordance with STV's "new start" under the slogan "Television that looks at you" on the evening of January 1, 2004 led by Richard Rybníček, STV2 was renamed Dvojka aiming at a niche audience, with most cultural, sports and minority/regional programming moved to this channel. Up until then, the channel served mainly as a depository of repeats from the first channel. The channel announced new cultural talk shows (Anjeli strážni, Literárne oko, Pod lampou), regional news services (Regionálny denník Regionálne správy) fed by the Košice, Banska Bystrica and Bratislava studios, a three-hour monthly program presented from the regions of Slovakia (Vitajte u nás…) and a variety of international imports, as well as coverage of the national football and hockey leagues and key international sporting events. Overnight (approximately after midnight), Dvojka presented recordings of government sessions.

On December 1, 2022, the channel started broadcasting 24 hours a day.

== Logos and identities ==
Dvojka's logo from 1993 to 1996

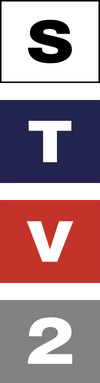
Dvjoka's logo from 1996 to 1999

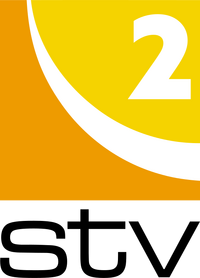
Dvojka's logo from 1999 to 2001

Dvojka's logo from 2001 to 2004

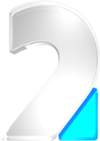
Dvojka's logo from 2004 to 2012

Dvojka's logo from 2012 to 2026
