= Radio Slovakia International =

International broadcasting service of Slovakia

Coordinates: 48°9′13.21″N 17°6′53.26″E

- Type: Radio network
- Country: Slovakia

Ownership
- Owner: STVR
- Key people: Mária Mikušová (Teamleader)

History
- Launch date: 4 January 1993; 33 years ago

Coverage
- Availability: International

Links
- Website: enrsi.stvr.sk

Radio Slovakia International (RSI) is Slovakia's official internet-based international broadcaster. The station was created as a shortwave service almost simultaneously with the emergence of independent Slovakia and began broadcasting on 4 January 1993.

Its duties were laid down as providing listeners in other countries with information about the new state and maintaining contact with the numerous expatriate Slovak communities around the world. Organizationally, it is a part of the state-owned nationwide public broadcasting organization The Slovak Television and Radio (Slovak: Slovenská televízia a rozhlas).

== Programming ==
RSI's programmes are broadcast in English, German, French, Russian, Spanish, and, for expatriates, Slovak. Its daily 30-minute magazine programmes contain news from Slovakia, features on the Slovak economy, sciences, culture, geography, environment, sports, examples of the spoken, written, and musical arts, and portraits of important personalities.

== Broadcasting ==
Radio Slovakia International broadcasts worldwide via internet and via the World Radio Network platform.

=== Frequencies ===
| Town | Transmitter | Frequency | ERP | Time | Changing with |
|---|---|---|---|---|---|
| Bratislava | Mýtna 1 | 98,9 MHz | 0,20 kW | 18:00–6:00 h. | Rádio Patria |

==== Shortwave transmissions ====
Radio Slovakia International historically broadcast on shortwave from Slovakia. The program is now relayed via WRMI in English, Slovak, Spanish, as well as via stations in Luxembourg in German and in the UAE in Russian.

===== Former English-language schedule and frequencies =====
- 01:00–01:30 to North America on 5930 kHz (summer) and 7230 kHz (winter), and to South America on 9440 kHz
- 07:00–07:30 to Australasia on 9440 and 11650 kHz (summer), and 13715 and 15460 kHz (winter)
- 16:30–17:00 to Western Europe on 5920 kHz (summer only)
- 17:30–18:00 to Western Europe on 6055 kHz
- 17:30–18:00 to Western Europe on 5915 kHz (winter only)
- 18:30–19:00 to Western Europe on 5920 kHz (summer only) and 6055 kHz
- 19:30–20:00 to Western Europe on 5915 kHz (winter only) and 7345 kHz

== See also ==
- Rádio FM
- Slovenská televízia a rozhlas (Slovak Television and Radio), the Slovak publicly funded radio and television broadcaster
- List of international radio broadcasters
