= Orlík killers =

Convicted Czech serial killers

- Born: Prague, Czechoslovakia
- Conviction: Murder x6
- Penalty: Life imprisonment (Černý); Life imprisonment, commuted to 25 years (Kuna); 21 years (Kopáč); 14 years (Chodounský); 12 years, commuted to 10 years (Meierová)

Details
- Victims: 6
- Span of crimes: 1991–1993
- Country: Czech Republic
- States: Prague, Central Bohemia, Liberec
- Date apprehended: 1995

The Orlík Killers were a gang of Czech serial killers and Organized crime group who, between 1991 and 1993, killed five people (mostly businessmen) for monetary gain. One gang member committed an additional murder on his own and also attempted one more — he wanted to acquire the victim's apartment, but she survived by sheer luck.

The murderers would stuff their victims' bodies in barrels, dissolve them in lye and then throw them into the Orlík Reservoir, an idea initially proposed by Vladimír Kuna.

== Members ==
Orlík Killers
- Orličtí Vrazi
- Founder: Karel Kopáč
- Years active: 1990 - 1993
- Territory: Czech Republic
- Membership: 5
- Activities: Kidnapping, Theft, Robbery, Murder, Body Disposal, Bombing, Arms Trafficking, Profiteering, Extortion

=== Karel Kopáč ===
Karel "Karlos" Kopáč (3 June 1960 – 15 April 2004) was the leader of the group. Before the Velvet Revolution, he trained as a milling machine operator and was once convicted of theft. After the revolution, he worked as a porter and bouncer in nightclubs and developed an interest in martial arts. At the beginning of 1990, he joined the Rapid Response Unit, but left after a few months, allegedly due to a low salary and poor training.

After quitting, he found work as an arms dealer, mostly trading Škorpion machine pistols and grenades. He lived at Příčná 840/22 in Rudná, close to childhood friend and later accomplice, Vladimír Kuna.

=== Ludvík Černý ===
Ludvík "Pacient" Černý (born 25 May 1965) was the main killer of the group. Before the revolution, he worked as a bricklayer, but also secretly sold illegal goods as a fartsovchik. In 1985, he was convicted of theft and served a prison sentence. After the revolution, he found employment as a taxi driver at Mercedes-Benz Bohemia Praha, and often visited gyms and solariums (in one of which he would later meet Kopáč and Kuna). In 1992, Černý married, and in 1995, the couple had a son. He was well-liked by his neighbours, regarded as a good husband and nicknamed "Mimísek" (loosely translated as "babyface") by acquaintances due to his kind appearance.

=== Vladimír Kuna ===
Vladimír Kuna (born 21 June 1964) was a childhood friend of Kopáč, who often accompanied him to the gyms Podolí. He would eventually set up his own gym in the cellar of his own home, where he stored a variety of weapons, including anti-tank RPG missiles.

=== Accomplices ===
The two remaining members were Kopáč's sister, Irena Meierová, and her boyfriend, Petr Chodounský (born 19 July 1965).

== Murders ==
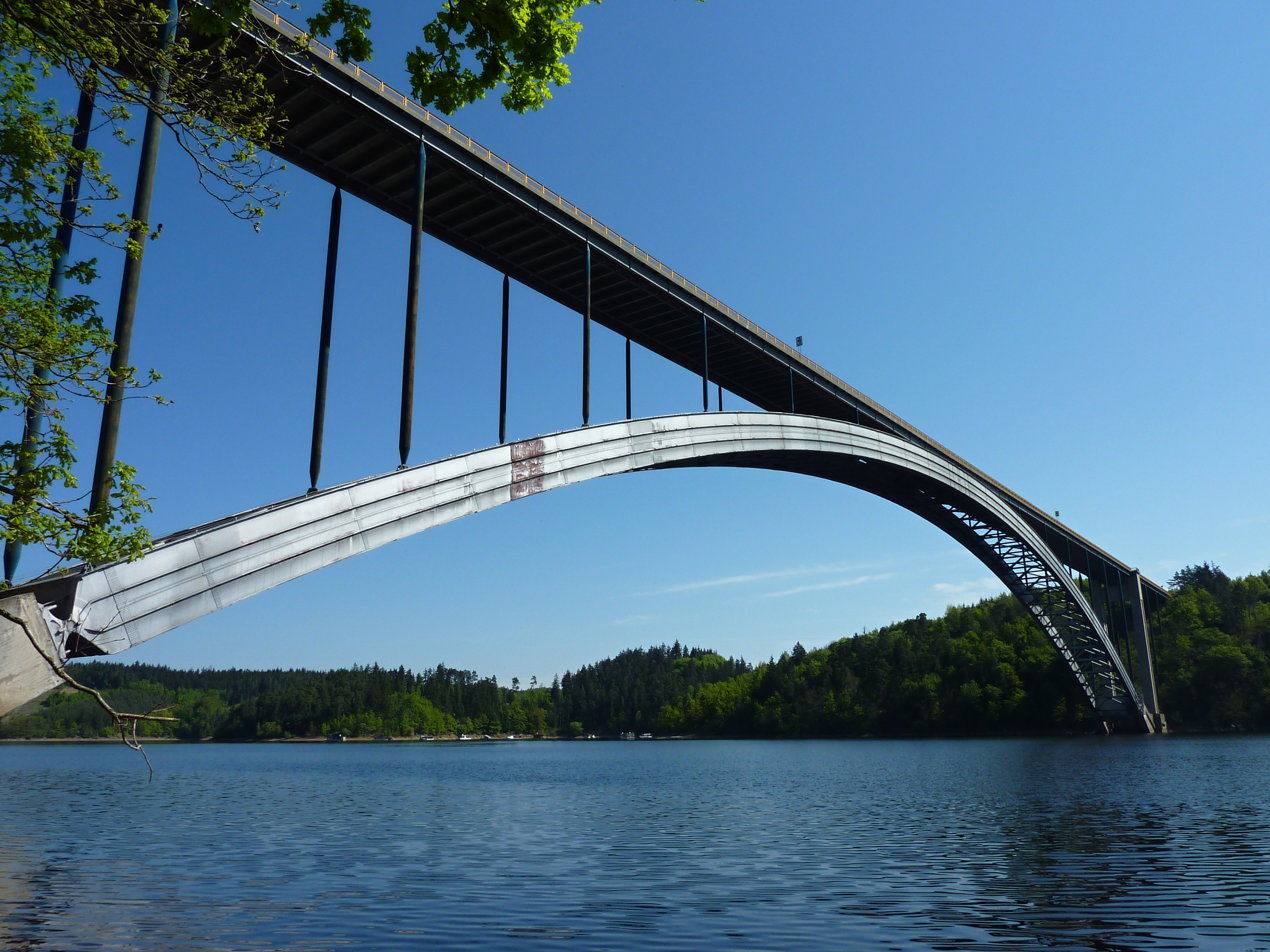
The killers would dump their victims' bodies from the Žďákov Bridge.

=== Aleš Katovský ===
In 1991, Kopáč met businessman Aleš Katovský, who hired him as a bodyguard and eventually gained his trust. The initial idea to kill the businessman and rob him of his money came from Černý.

On 5 April 1991, Kopáč and Katovský left for Rudná, where Černý, posing as a client interested in exchanging currencies, was waiting for them. At arrival, he told Katovský that he did not have the necessary amount to exchange, and asked to be driven to his home. When they reached the railroad crossing where Na Radosti Street crossed Plzeňská Street in Zličín, Černý shot Katovský in the head from the back seat. The car started swerving and there was a risk of it colliding with an incoming bus, but the criminals managed to regain control of it.

Kopáč and Černý then drove to a nearby landfill, wrapped up the body in wire netting, put in the trunk of the car and drove to the Žďákov Bridge, where they threw the body in the water. From this killing, they acquired 800,000 koruna, with Černý later selling the car at a bazaar to the German owner of Musik Haus.

=== Leorent Lipoveci ===
The second murder took place on 9 January 1992. On that date, Kuna had arranged to sell a weapon to Leorent Lipoveci, a waiter who had immigrated from Kosovo. The deal was to take place at Kuna's apartment in Rudná, but unbeknownst to them, Lipoveci had armed himself with a knife just in case he was attacked. While browsing the suitcase full of weapons, Černý suddenly shot him in the head, frightening both Kopáč and Kuna. Kopáč later testified that Černý replied to their shock by claiming that "[He] was the Joker!", and since then, they referred to him as "Pacient" (The Patient, alluding to a psychiatric hospital). The trio gathered 30,000 koruna from this killing.

At this time, Kuna came up with the idea of disposing of the corpse by stuffing it into a barrel, which he had prepared in advance, and pouring lye over it. Kopáč was initially unconvinced, but Kuna and Černý nevertheless stuffed Lipoveci's body inside, poured lye and water over it, and then welded the barrel. All three then loaded the barrel into a borrowed Avia truck and went to the Žďákov Bridge, where, like Katovský, threw it into the water.

After the murder, Černý started wearing the dead man's gold chain. He also expressed interest in appropriating Lipoveci's apartment but was dissuaded by Kopáč. Using their victim's car, the trio drove to Weiden in der Oberpfalz, Germany, parked the car in front of a hypermarket and then drove back home.

=== Vlastimil Hodr ===
Hodr, an antique dealer, was shot in the head near a gas station on Plzeňská Street in Prague by Černý, who wanted to steal a golden seal he was carrying on his person. He then contacted Kuna and Kopáč to help dismember the body, as Hodr was too big and could not fit in the barrel at all. After finishing the procedure, they stuffed the remains and threw them off the bridge into the water. The stolen seal was never recovered.

=== Anna Medková ===
The gang's next victim was Kuna's mother, Anna Medková, who owned a salon. On 7 February 1992, Černý sent her a package containing a mixture of semtex, TNT and screws to her house in Mnichovice. Immediately after opening the package in her kitchen, it exploded in Medkova's hands, causing her serious injuries. Kuna, dissatisfied with the outcome, planned to suffocate his mother with a pillow while visiting her in the hospital, but she succumbed to her injuries five days later. The blast occurred on her birthday; however, this was not intentional, as Kuna allegedly did not know his mother's date of birth.

The murderers earned 1.6 million koruna through the murder. Kuna and his brother got half of the money at first, but his share was later stolen by other members. Petr Chodounský, playing the role of an entrepreneur, offered Kuna's brother a bargain - instead of the promised earnings, however, they stole his money.

=== Afrim Kryeziu ===
This murder was carried out solely by Černý, and is normally not associated with the gang's activities. He was hired by a group of Yugoslav drug traffickers to carry out a job with the help of Afrim "Frenki" Kryeziu, a Kosovo Albanian. On the morning of 1 June 1993, Černý was instructed to meet him on the corner of a house on Větrná Street in the centre of Liberec. After seeing Kryezia approaching in his BMW, Černý pulled out a Škorpion submachine gun, firing nine times at the car and killing him. As a result, the car crashed into a stone pillar, which was part of a church fence that remained damaged for a long time. Černý then left the scene on foot. The cartridges fired from his gun were later found on a stairway leading to Rybářská Street, as he had used a plastic bag while firing to avoid them being found by authorities at the actual scene of the shooting later on. His total haul amounted to 200,000 koruna.

=== Jaroslav Meier ===
At one point, Kopáč suggested that they could earn a lot of money by opening an erotic club, but as none of the gang members had the funds to run it, he approached his brother-in-law Jaroslav Meier and asked him to guarantee a bank loan on his house. Meier, who had built the house himself, refused. Kopáč's sister, Irena, also learned of the suggestion, and at the end of 1992, she told her brother that if her husband was killed, the house would be handed to her and she would guarantee the loan. Her reason for the hit on her husband was her wanting to live with Chodounský, as well as her personal interest in the property. Kopáč was against the idea, and only pretended to be interested in front of his sister, even promising to procure the killer himself if she was being honest with him. He then had an acquaintance pretend to be a hired gunman, to whom Meierová handed over an envelope with the money Kopáč had given her. To her surprise, these turned out to be newspaper clippings.

After Kopáč did not keep his promise, Meierová and Chodounský turned to Černý, who accepted. On 6 July 1993, Černý shot Meier four times with the Škorpion, which was supplied by Kopáč, at his house in Rudná. From the murder, the killers received 100,000 koruna.

According to court and criminal records, Chodounský was not Meier's lover and had never asked Černý for anything.

=== Attempted murder of Ján Mato ===
In the summer of 1992, Černý attempted to kill police officer Ján Mato, who knew some of the gang members from the gym. The reason for the crime was Černý wanting to acquire his apartment in Prague 5 and his service badge. Despite this, there is no indication that Mato knew of his friends' criminal activities.

That summer, Kopáč, Černý and Mato went to shoot at targets in Kuna's cellar. At one point, Černý put a pistol to Mato's head and pulled the trigger, but the gun jammed and did not fire. Mato, in a calm manner, insulted his would-be killer and promptly left. Later on, he would be disciplined for associating with the gang members. In 2002, he was murdered in the Prague Metro in an unrelated matter.

== Accident ==
On 7 January 1994, Kuna and Kopáč were driving when the latter suddenly lost control and crashed the car. Both men were taken to the hospital - Kuna received minor injuries, but Kopáč suffered a spinal injury which left him a wheelchair user. Since then, he refused to participate in any criminal activities, but still did not want to go to the police, as he was afraid the other members would kill him. He later claimed that the crash was punishment for the deeds he had committed.

== Findings and arrests ==
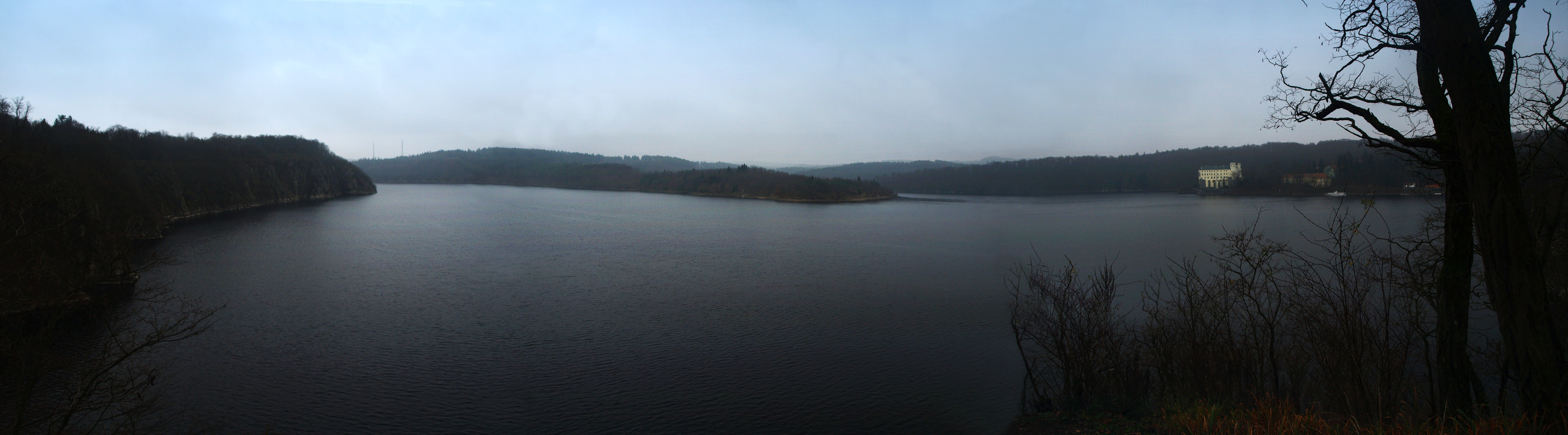
The Orlík Reservoir

In 1993, criminal investigators heard unsubstantiated rumours about several entrepreneurs who had "disappeared". Among these were vague claims that Černý had boasted of "disappearing" several people, but due to lacking evidence and nothing pointing towards specific victims, this was not investigated further.

The first tangible piece of evidence was traces of blood on the seat of a vehicle Černý had sold to a car dealership, which was later conclusively proven as belonging to Aleš Katovský. Acting upon information that some businessmen had been buried at the bottom of a dam, police began searching in vain at the Slapy Reservoir. While investigating Černý, the investigators obtained records from a dealership that not only he had borrowed an Avia at the time of the alleged disappearances, but according to the number of kilometres driven, the Orlík Reservoir was identified as a possible dumping site for the bodies.

On 10 July 1995, divers were dispatched to explore the bottom of the dam. The search lasted weeks since Czech police lacked the necessary equipment to search waters more than 40 meters deep. A TV Nova crew also arrived at the survey site, and at the request of the police, produced a cover story claiming that the purpose of the heightened activity was cleaning the bottom of the reservoir. After a few days, two barrels containing human remains and a body wrapped in wire netting were found.

When he learned about the discovery of the bodies while watching TV, Kopáč decided to commit suicide. He called the police beforehand and confessed to the crimes, but was persuaded from doing so after three hours of negotiations. During his arrest, he was shot in the crotch. At first, Kopáč refused to cooperate, but after learning that Černý was denying everything and the other members had tried to pin the blame entirely on him, Kopáč decided to put his confessions in writing. This written confession would later be used as the prosecution's main evidence in the case.

In it, Kopáč claimed that the lye was provided by Ivan Roubal, and from the money he had received, he had bought a villa in the Vysočany district, where he wanted to set up a gym.

== Trial, imprisonment and later fates ==
On 18 April 1997, after a 4-month long trial and nine court sessions, all five defendants were found guilty and convicted of their respective crimes. Ludvík Černý and Vladimír Kuna were sentenced to life imprisonment, Karel Kopáč to 21 years, Petr Chodounský to 14 years for fraud and Irena Meierová to 12 years. Each of them appealed their sentences, but the appellate court later only reduced Kuna and Meierová's sentences (25 years and 10 years, respectively), while upholding the others'.

Karel Kopáč refused to accept the verdict, and on 15 April 2004, he hanged himself at the Kuřim prison with his pyjama cords. Irena Meierová was paroled in 2002 and is now said to live in Jinočany under a new identity; Petr Chodounský was released in 2009, in 2020 started working in social services and in 2021 changed his last name after his wife. Vladimír Kuna was paroled for good behaviour on 18 June 2013 and is said to live somewhere near Chomutov with his new wife, whom he married in prison.

Ludvík Černý later changed his surname to Zámečník and applied for parole on 5 October 2017, but his request was rejected. He was also revealed to be involved in two other prominent crimes:

- in 1990, he stole the BMW of businessman Petr Mach, the then-owner of AC Sparta Prague, and took it across the border to Ukraine. Using a forged letter penned by the then-Federal Minister of the Interior, Petr Čermák, he managed the Slovak-Ukrainian customs office to let him through.
- when double murderer Jiří Kajínek escaped from Mírov Prison on 29 October 2000, Černý had allegedly advised him to hide in his apartment with his wife Marie on the fifth floor of a panel house in Prague 13. Kajínek hid successfully for 40 days before being captured. Shortly after, it was discovered that Černý had forged a lease, as a result of which his wife and son were evicted from their home.

== In popular culture ==
- In 2005, director Jiří Svoboda directed the film Sametoví vrazi, which was based on the case. The TV series Nineties from 2022 also portrayed the case.

== See also ==
- List of serial killers by country
- František Mrázek
- Antonín Běla
- Radovan Krejčíř

== Bibliography ==
- Jaroslav Jelínek (1998). Kauza Orlík: [nová fakta] [The Orlík case [new facts]] (in Czech). Tamtam. ISBN 80-902234-8-6.
- Horák Vratislav (2004). Orlík: děsivý hřbitov, aneb, 122 otázek pro vraha : (příběh Karla Kopáče, Ludvíka Černého a Vladimíra Kuny o tom, jak lidé měli zmizet beze stop) [Orlík: a scary cemetery, or, 122 questions for the killers: (the story of Karel Kopáč, Ludvík Černý and Vladimír Kuna about how people were supposed to disappear without a trace)] (in Czech). Mladá fronta. ISBN 80-204-1147-X.
- Jaromír Slušný (2006). Černá kniha českých bestiálních vrahů [Black Book of Bestial Czech Assassins] (in Czech). ISBN 80-87021-06-1.
