= Antonín Běla =

Czech gangster (1944–1996)

- Born: 4 January 1944; Plzeň, Protectorate of Bohemia and Moravia
- Died: 14 April 1996 (aged 52); Úvaly, Czech Republic

Antonín Běla (4 January 1944 – 14 April 1996) was a Czech Romani from the Kalderash group, a prominent figure in the criminal underworld in the 1990s. He was responsible for a number of crimes, including attempted illegal border crossing, assault, speculation, car and arms trafficking, and his name was also involved in two murders. He collaborated with František Mrázek and the Armenian mafia. On 14 April 1996, unknown men fired around 40 rounds from a 9×19 mm Parabellum submachine gun at him in front of his house, at least 22 of which hit Běla. Among the suspects were his companion František Mrázek and Běla's former bodyguard Pavel Šrytr, but the courts did not prove the murder to anyone.

== Biography ==
Běla was born in 1944 in Plzeň. He started criminal career during 1960s. He also tried several times to cross the Iron Curtain to West Germany but never succeeded. In 1974, Běla and him companions robbed a post office, stealing 47,000 CSK and killing a police officer in the process. This event led to his rise as a mob boss. He started to create connections with politicians and other influential people even before the Velvet Revolution. He was involved in illegal border crossings, assault, speculation, and the trafficking of cars and weapons. During the 1990s he was considered to be the boss of the Czech underworld. He worked with the Armenian mafia and František Mrázek. After death of his son Marcel, he became more brutal which led to conflicts with his associates. He was murdered in Úvaly on 14 April 1996.

== In popular culture ==
Story of a Godfather (Czech: Příběh kmotra), a Czech film directed by Petr Nikolaev, is inspired by the story of František Mrázek. A character named Farkaš is inspired by Běla and played by Andrej Hryc.

Běla was played by Richard Němec in the TV series Nineties.
