= Josef Mareš =

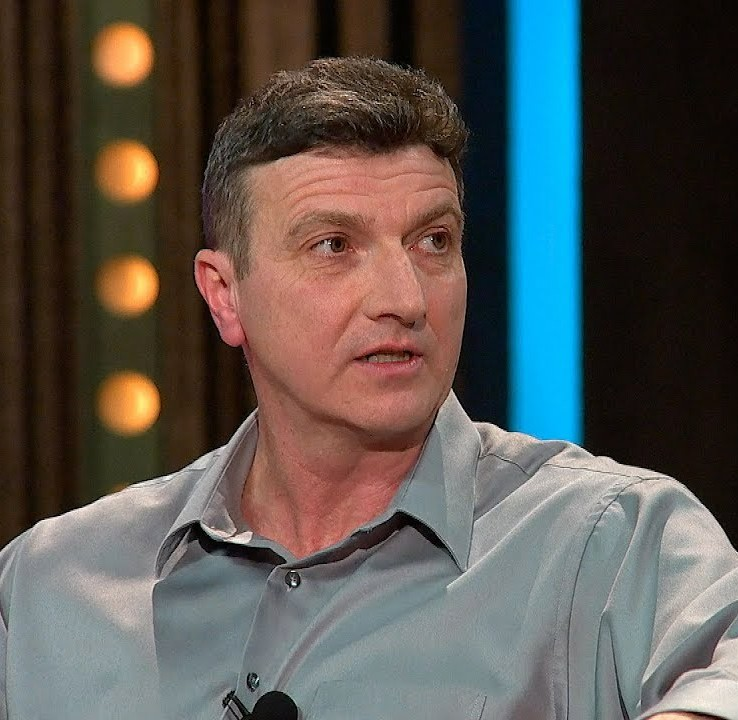
- Mareš in 2018
- Born: 25 February 1964 (age 62); Czech Republic
- Education: Czech Technical University in Prague
- Occupations: police officer; screenwriter

Josef Mareš (born 25 February 1964) is a Czech screenwriter and former police officer. He was the head of the homicide department of the regional directorate of the Police of the Czech Republic in Prague. He is the co-author of the scripts for the television series Případy 1. oddělení, Nineties and Docent.

== Biography ==
Mareš was born on 25 February 1964 in Prague. In the years 1983–1988, he studied technical cybernetics at the Faculty of Electrical Engineering of the Czech Technical University in Prague.

He started with the Police of the Czech Republic in 1990 as an investigator at the District Office of Investigation in Prague 4. He worked at the homicide department from 1992 until 30 November 2019, when he retired to civilian life after disagreements with his superior Radka Drexlerová. In 2001–2006, he was the head of the 1st department of the Prague murder party, then he served as deputy commander of the Criminal Police and Investigation Service (2006–2009). In 2010–2019, he once again served as the head of the homicide department.

The most famous cases, in which he participated in the investigation, were the case of Orlík killers, the murder of Ludvika Jonáková, the wife of the controversial businessman Ivan Jonák, murders connected with the illegal trade in light heating oils, and the murder of Anna Janatková. In 2022, he played Ensign Jan Vetchý in the series Nineties. He is a big fan of AC Sparta Prague. On 20 October 2022, he published his first book, Josef Mareš: My cases from the 1st department. On 16 January 2023, he was nominated for the Film Fans Award, for the Nineties series. On 4 February 2023, he was nominated for a Film Critics Award, but did not win the award. In 2023, he appeared in the series Docent as Marek Tomášek.

In 2020, he started working at the Office for the Documentation and the Investigation of the Crimes of Communism.
