= Gangster Ka =

- Movie Poster
- Directed by: Jan Pachl
- Written by: Jaroslav Kmenta; Jan Pachl
- Produced by: Adam Dvořák
- Starring: Hynek Čermák
- Edited by: Adam Dvořák
- Music by: Tadeáš Věrčák
- Distributed by: Bioscop
- Release dates: 10 September 2015 (Part 1); 26 November 2015 (Part 2)
- Running time: 100 Minutes (part 1); 100 Minutes (part 2)
- Country: Czech Republic
- Language: Czech
- Budget: 50 Million CZK
- Box office: $815,687 (part 1) $527,410 (part 2)

Gangster Ka is a 2015 Czech action thriller directed by Jan Pachl that is split into two parts: Gangster Ka (released September 10, 2015) and Gangster Ka: African (released November 26, 2015). It stars Hynek Čermák as Radim Kraviec, a fictionalised version of Radovan Krejčíř. The film is based on the novel Padrino Krejčíř by Jaroslav Kmenta, whose works previously served as a basis for a similar film, Story of a Godfather.

The film draws inspiration from political controversies of Czech politics. One of the characters, Milan Klein, is a corrupt politician who becomes Prime Minister, and is inspired by Stanislav Gross.

== Plot ==
The first part of the film follows Káčko during his criminal career in the Czech Republic. Káčko is a gangster in Ostrava who is known for shooting his rivals in the leg instead of killing them. He decides that Ostrava is too small for him and leaves for Prague. The Prague criminal world is dominated by Milota and Sivák, and Káčko starts a business with them, stealing 260 million crowns from them in the process. Káčko gains more influence and earns millions of crowns through various frauds and plans to overtake the Čepro company, which owns all fuel resources in the country. The plan fails when he is betrayed by one of his associates. Káčko is arrested and taken in custody awaiting trial. Milota and Sivák try to steal money from Káčko's accounts, but fail because Káčko gave the pin codes to his father and account numbers to his pregnant wife Sandra. His father dies during torture but does not give up the codes. Sandra, who was abducted by Sivák, is released but loses the baby as a result of the abduction. Káčko is released from custody because of an investigator's murder and his lawyer. He leaves the prison to get revenge on Milota. Káčko decides to spare Sivák because he was only obeying Milota's orders, and gives him a list of people he is supposed to murder. Sivák kills people on the list one by one, and gains the nickname "Butcher". Klein tries to negotiate more money from Káčko, only for the latter to threaten to destroy him if he does not obey. Klein is scared and asks Milota for help, as he has materials that can be used for evidence of Káčko's crimes. He gives the material to Lánský, an investigator, who wants to arrest Káčko. The police raid Káčko's mansion and arrest him, but he escapes when he asks to use the toilet and flees from the Czech Republic. Milota is murdered on Klein's orders.

=== African ===
Káčko escapes to Seychelles. Meanwhile, Sivák takes over Milota's business and starts to work with Klein, who wants to get Káčko back to the Czech Republic because Káčko has evidence that can compromise him. Lánský starts to investigate Klein and his wife is killed in a murder attempt ordered by Klein. Lánský reopens his investigation of Káčko, who had "sobered up" and made money selling imported toilet paper in Seychelles. Káčko becomes influential in Seychellois politics and helps local politician Dr. Martier during his campaign, with the hope of acquiring Seychellois citizenship. Lánský sends agents after him, and Káčko angrily reveals his association with Klein to the media which leads to the fall of the government. Káčko then moves to South Africa because his friend Darda starts to work with Lánský. Káčko becomes a fugitive in South Africa and makes connections in the South African crime world. He forms a partnership with local mob boss Uncle Cyril before murdering him. Káčko becomes the most powerful mobster in South Africa but starts to have problems with the public and is threatened by possible loss of his fugitive status which would lead to his extradition to the Czech Republic. Káčko decides to sell drugs against his principles, but fails when his associate John Greengrass betrays him and the Pakistani mafia steal his drugs. Káčko leads group of criminals in the Pakistani quarter to reacquire them. The mission ends in a shootout and Dardan is shot and killed. Káčko is arrested when Lánský gets a map that marks graves of Káčko's victims. Lánský tells him during the investigation that Káčko's family returned to the Czech Republic, but he cannot assure their safety against Sivák. Káčko has Sivák killed to protect his son and wife, and the film ends with him facing trial for his crimes.

== Cast and characters ==
- Hynek Čermák as Radim Kraviec (alias "Káčko") – The eponymous Gangster Ka and the protagonist of the film. He leads a gang of Albanian criminals and gains influence in politics. Čermák described him as a "partial psychopath and partial coward". He is inspired by Radovan Krejčíř
- Vlastina Svátková as Sandra – Káčko's wife. She is a naive woman who falls in love with Káčko and marries him. She does not leave him even after he abuses her because she wants to keep their family and is dependent on Káčko.
- Predrag Bjelac as Dardan Cirkel, the Albanian – an Albanian criminal who is a Káčko's close associate and friend. He is more sympathetic than Káčko and sometimes tries to warn him that he goes too far.
- Filip Čapka as Jan Lánský – A principled policeman who investigates Káčko and tries to arrest him. He serves as the main antagonist of the film. Káčko tries to bribe him and sends him three million crowns, which he rejects.
- Alexej Pyško as Sivák – A mobster and Milota's right hand and eventual successor. He becomes associated with Káčko.
- Jaromír Hanzlík as Kraviec Senior – Káčko's father and honest man who is disappointed in what has Káčko become.
- Miroslav Etzler as Vratislav Milota – A mobster inspired by František Mrázek.
- Tomáš Jeřábek as Milan Klein – A corrupt politician who becomes Prime Minister thanks to Káčko, whom he later tries to get rid of. He is inspired by Stanislav Gross.
- Zdeněk Žák as Hakl – An old policeman who helps Lánský.
- Jan Vlasák as Polanecký – A civic attorney who defends Káčko at court.
- Jan Révai as Budy – Káčko's associate who betrays him.
- Brian Caspe as John Greengrass – South African criminal associated with Balbeek. He befriends Káčko and helps him in South Africa before becoming his associate.
- Bob Beaudreault as Cyril Balbeek alias Uncle Cyril – South African mob boss.
- Peter Hosking as Dr. Martier – Seychellois politician who has ties to Káčko.

== Reception ==
The first part received mostly positive reviews. Its aggregated score is 64% from critical reviews according to Kinobox. Věra Míšková called Gangster Ka an average film but praised the performances of Čermák and Bjelac. Míšková criticized the film for being too complex and trying to show too much. Mirka Spáčilová praised the characters of Káčko and Dardan. She also praised the thrill and final part of film. She criticized the film for too exposition and Klein's character.

Slovak server Film Kult voted Gangster Ka as the tenth-best Czech-Slovak film of the 2010-2015 period.

The second part was also met with positive reviews with an aggregated score is 71% from Kinobox. Věra Míšková rated the second part more positively than the first. She called it more entertaining, and praised the addition of humor and thrill. Míšková also noted the performances of actors, particularly Čermák and Bjelac. Spáčilová praised the characters of Káčko and Dardan even though she criticized their inner commentaries. She also praised Čermák's performance in Káčko's role.
