= Peter Nagy (singer) =

Slovak musician (born 1959)

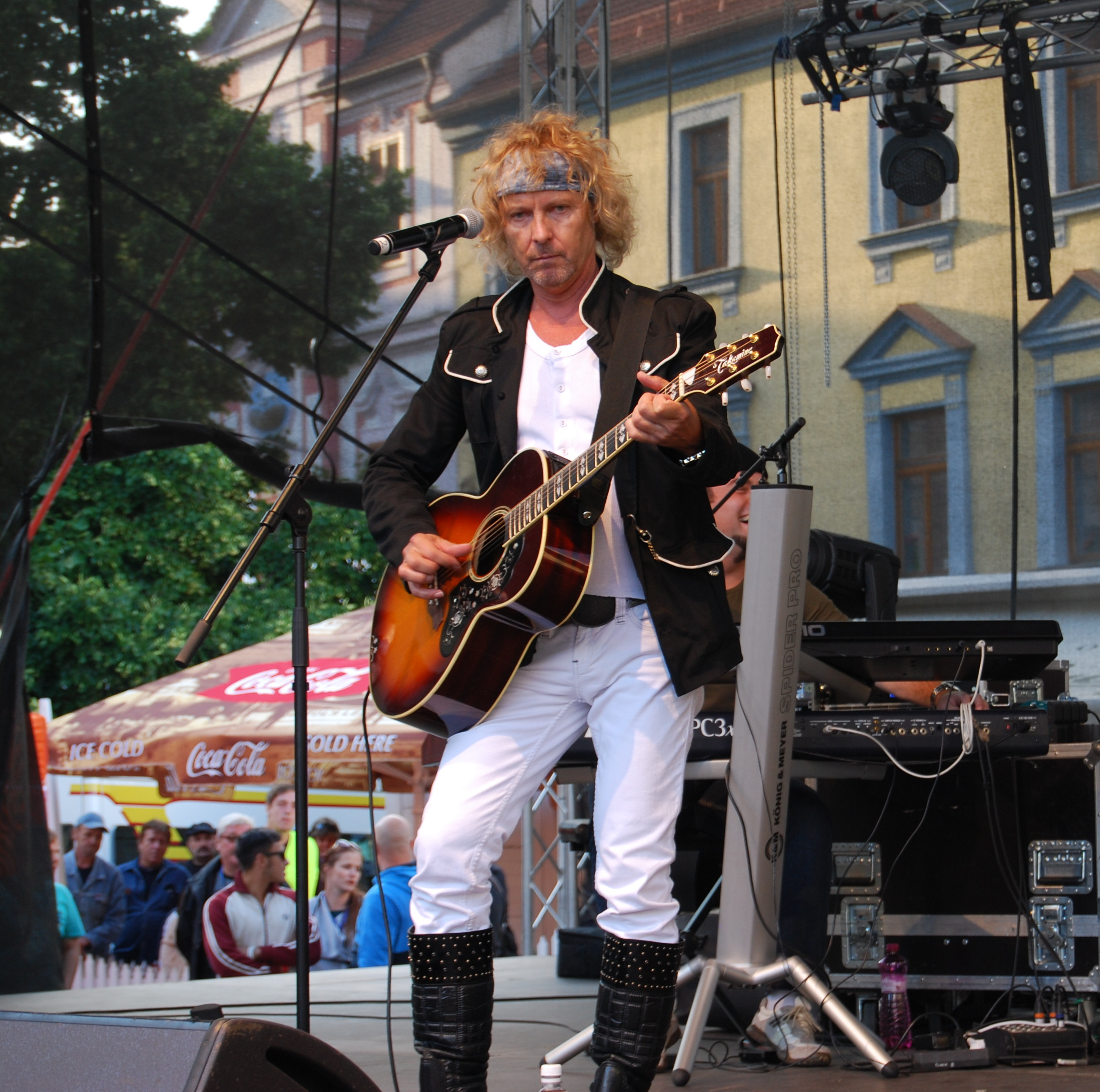

Background information
- Born: 9 April 1959 (age 67); Prešov, Czechoslovakia (now Slovakia)
- Genres: Pop rock
- Occupations: Singer, songwriter, actor
- Years active: 1983–present
- Website: peternagy.sk

Peter Nagy is a Slovak musician, singer, composer, songwriter, music producer and a photographer. He is one of the most successful singers of the Slovak pop music in the 1980s and the first half of the 1990s.

In 1985 he won the Zlatý slávik (Golden Nightingale) award in the category of male singer.

== Biography ==
Nagy started his musical career as a folk singer; first time he recorded a song in a studio as 17-years-old. His first song which gained massive popularity was Profesor Indigo (Professor Indigo), recorded in the studio of Slovak Radio in Košice in 1982; however, the song was released only in the following year. The character of Profesor Indigo in the musical clip was played by Andy Hryc.

In 1984 he released his debut album Chráň svoje bláznovstvá (Preserve your crazy ways), of which 620 thousand copies was sold.

After the release of his third album Myslíš na to, na čo ja? (Do you think of the same thing as me?), he was awarded with Zlatý erb Opusu (Golden Seal of Opus Records) for having sold one million records.

In 1987, only after 4 years of his professional career, he had played more than 500 concerts and twice sold out the famous venue of Lucerna in Prague. By the end of 1987 he released his first live album Peter Nagy v Štúdiu S, on which also Pavol Hammel and Vašo Patejdl collaborated.

His songs feature soundtracks of several films and he also appeared in several film documents.

== Awards ==
- 1984 — Silver Nightingale
- 1985 — Golden Nightingale
- 1986 — Silver Nightingale
- 2009 — Prague Hard Rock Cafe Hall of Fame
- 2012 — Legenda Nočního proudu of Czech Radio

== Personal life ==
In 2001, after 15 years of marriage, Peter Nagy divorced his wife Jana Nagyová, with whom he has one son Filip. He lives alternately in Bratislava and in Prague.

== Discography ==
- Chráň svoje bláznovstvá (1984)
- Mne sa neschováš (1985)
- Myslíš na to, na čo ja? (1986)
- Ale (1987)
- Šachy robia človeka (1989)
- Finta (1990)
- Jamaica Rum (1991)
- Revolver & muzika (1993)
- 008 (1996)
- 99 watt (1998)
- Nové svetlo (2002)
- Labute a havrany (2009)
- Petrolej (2021)
