= Gemballa =

German automobile manufacturing and tuning company

- Type: Public
- Industry: Automotive
- Founded: 1981; 2010 (new company)
- Founder: Uwe Gemballa
- Headquarters: Leonberg, Germany
- Key people: Steffen Korbach, CEO
- Products: Automobiles
- Website: www.gemballa.com

Gemballa GmbH is an automobile manufacturing and tuning company based in Leonberg, Germany, specializing in customization and aftermarket parts mainly for Porsche cars. Gemballa was founded by and named after Uwe Gemballa in 1981.

In May 2010, the Gemballa factory was seized by German authorities and shut down following the disappearance of Uwe Gemballa who was later found dead in South Africa. CEO Andreas Schwarz and investor Steffen Korbach were able to buy the brand rights and name rights from Gemballa in August 2010 and refounded the company as Gemballa GmbH. In 2016, Steffen Korbach became the sole CEO of the company and Alexander Schwarz stepped down. Korbach reportedly also took over the shares in the company from his former partner Schwarz.

A Gemballa GTR producing 600 hp (450 kW), based on a Porsche 911 (996), held the lap record for street legal vehicles at the Nürburgring in 2001 when Wolfgang Kaufmann lowered it to 7:32:52 min, taking the record from Porsche tuner TechArt. It was later beaten by a Porsche Carrera GT, by less than a second.

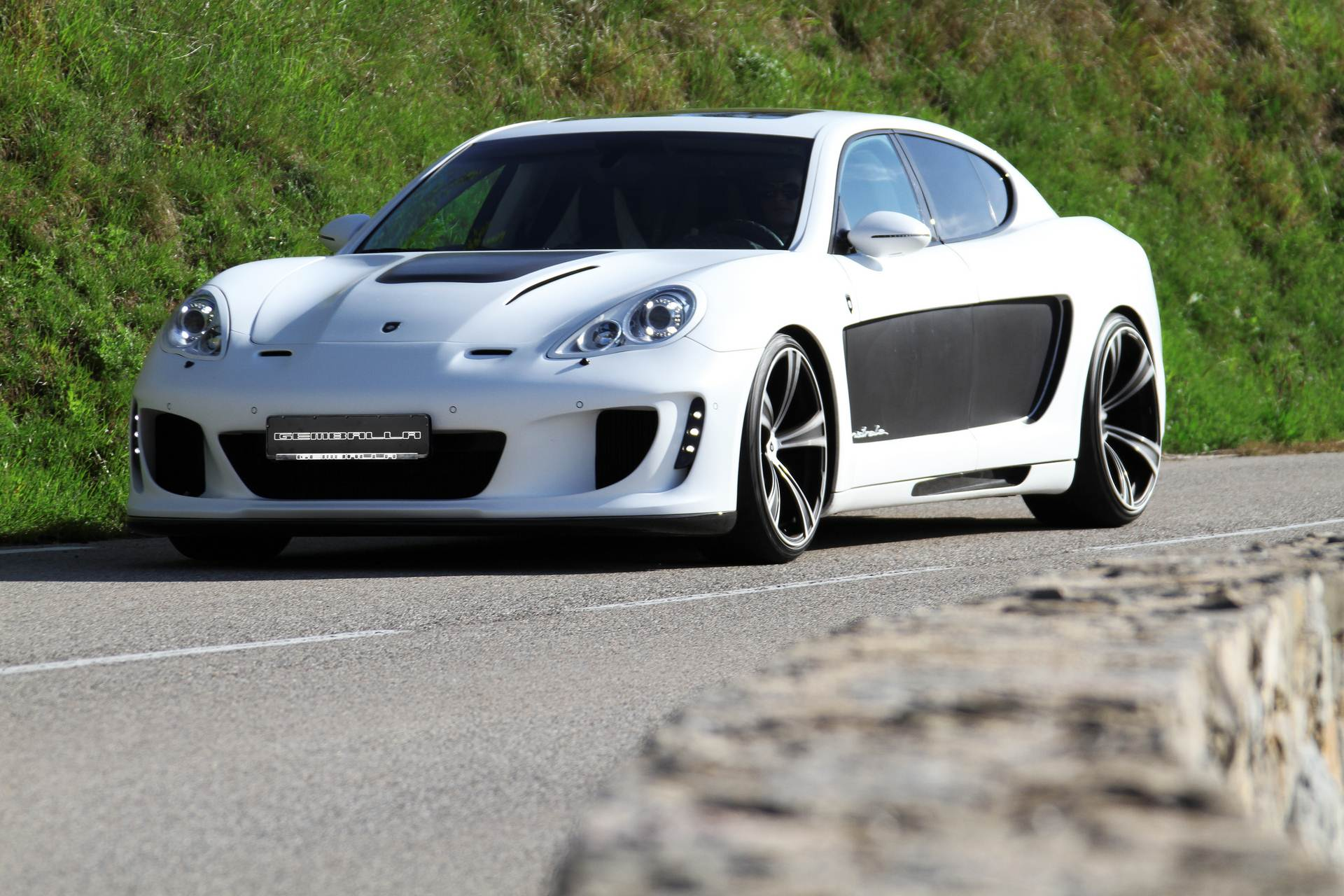
Gemballa Mistrale (based on the Porsche Panamera)

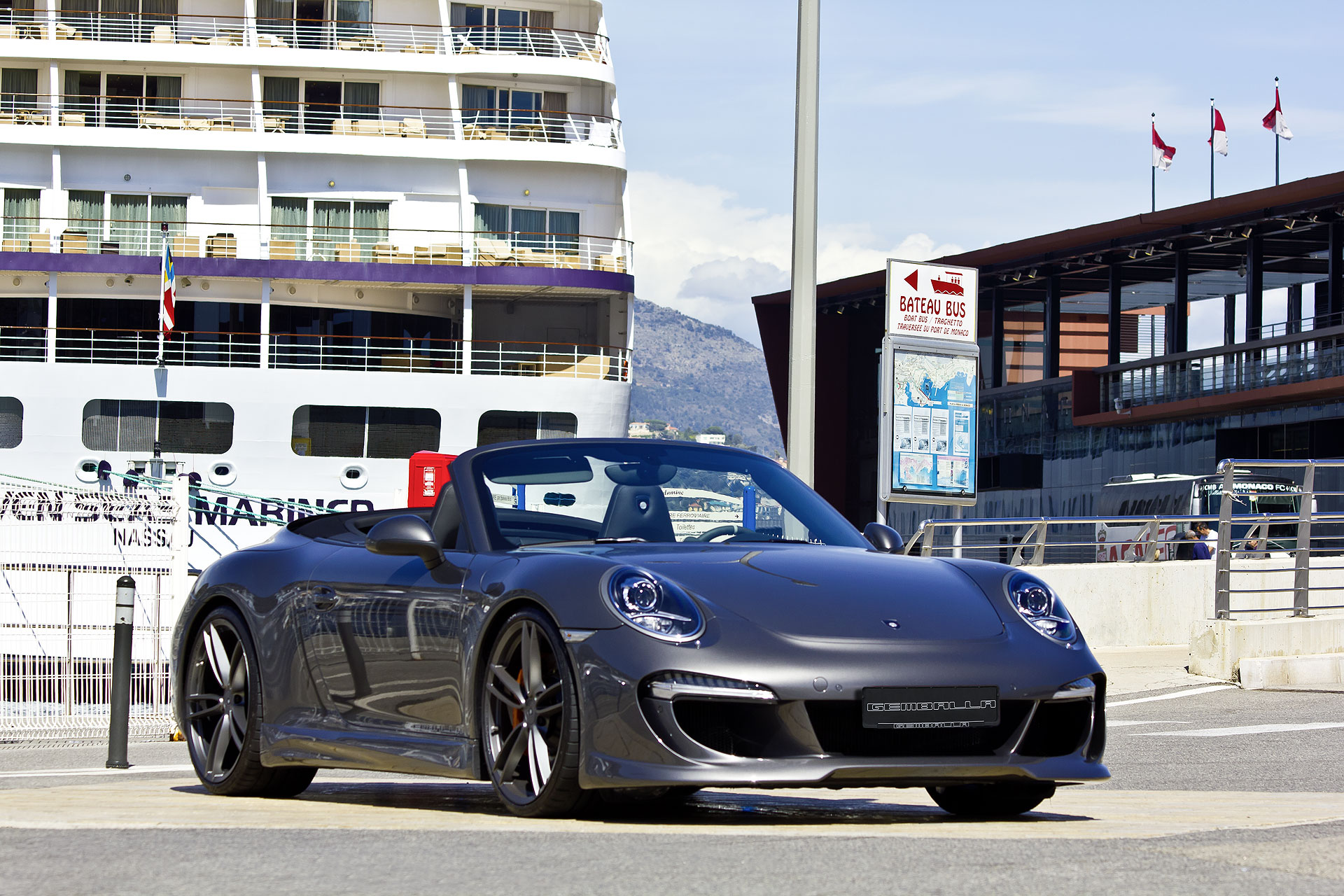
Gemballa GT Cabrio (based on the Porsche 911)

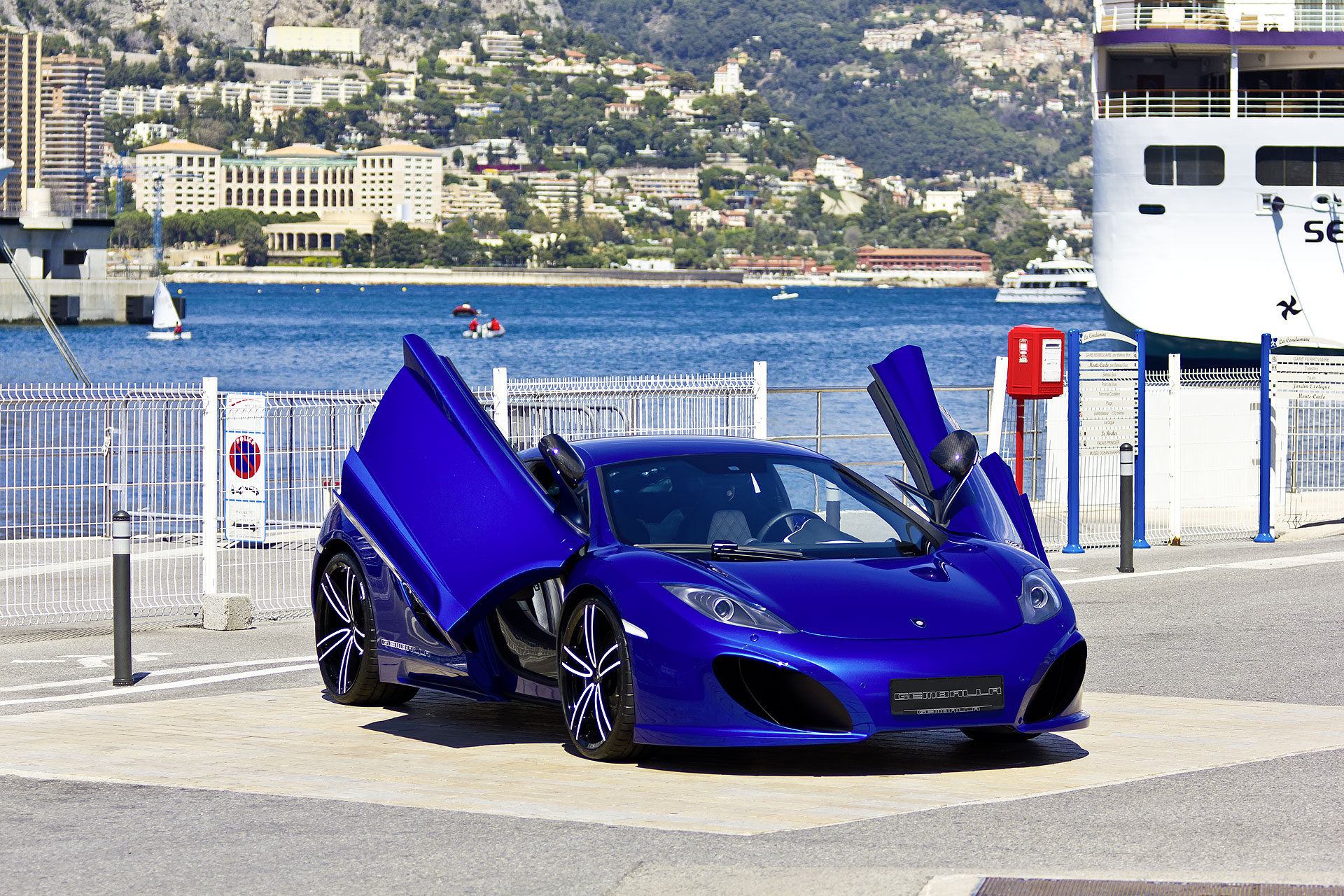
Gemballa GT (based on the McLaren 12C)

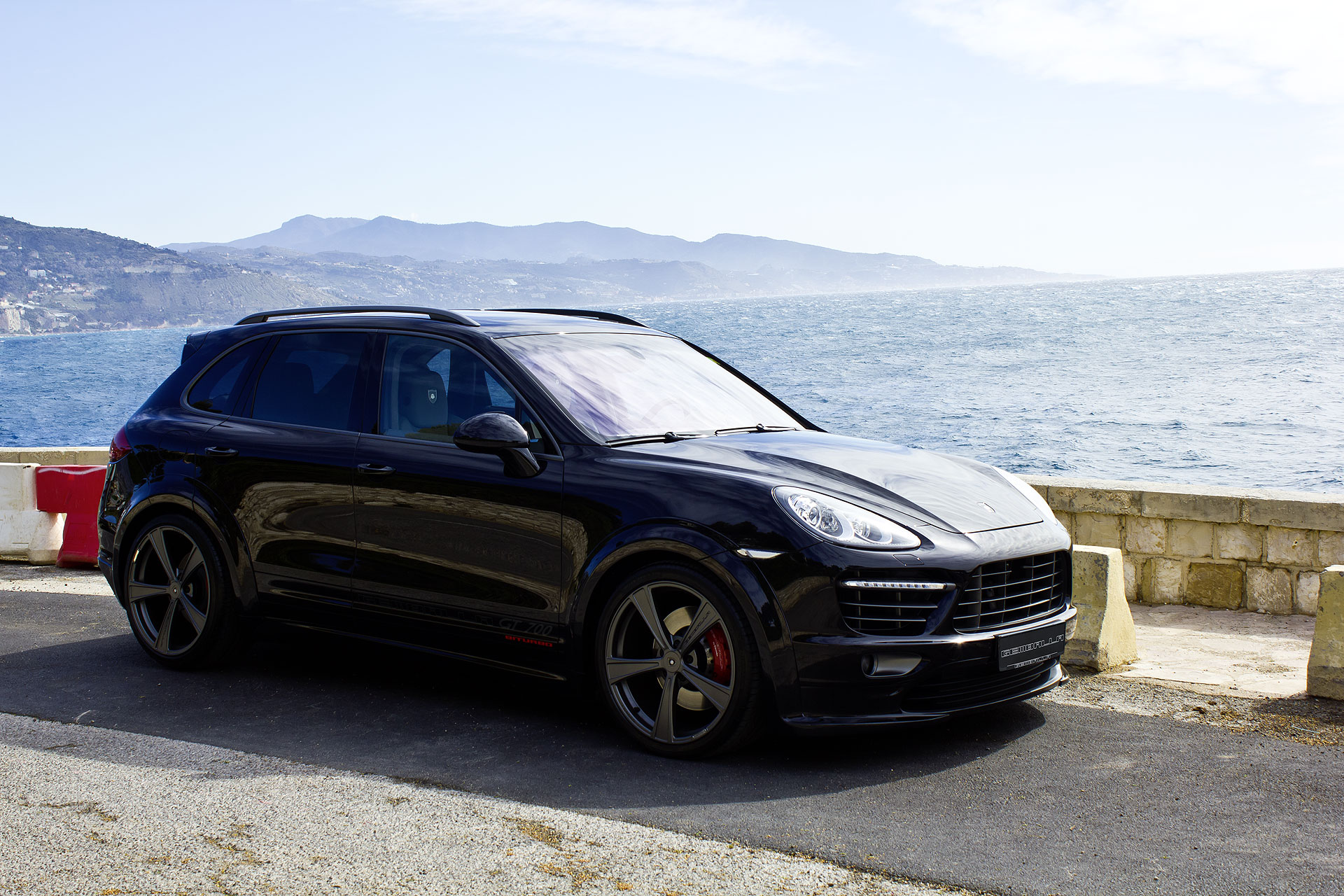
Gemballa Aero 2 (based on the Porsche Cayenne)

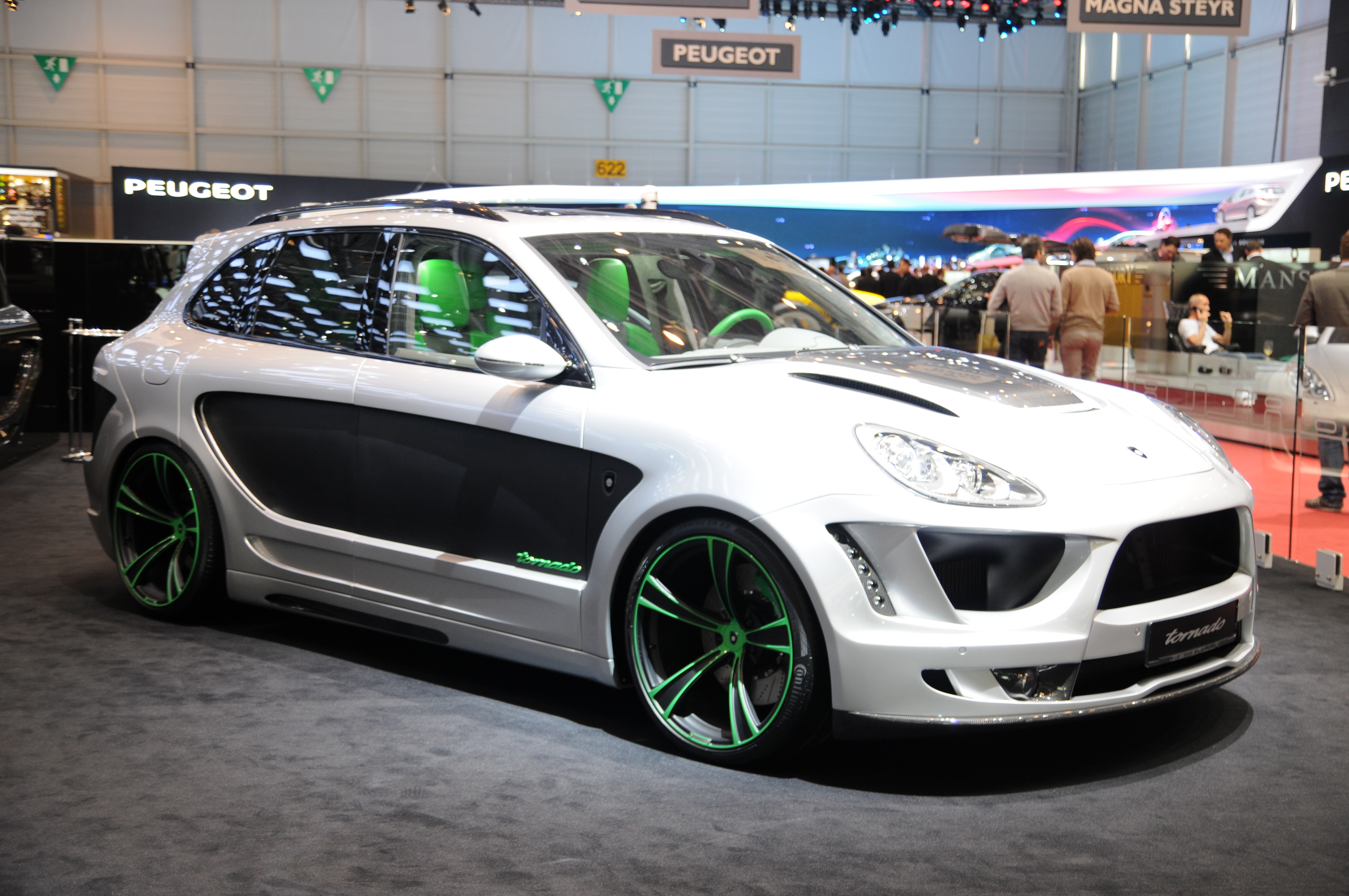
Gemballa Tornado (based on the Porsche Cayenne)

== Notable cars ==
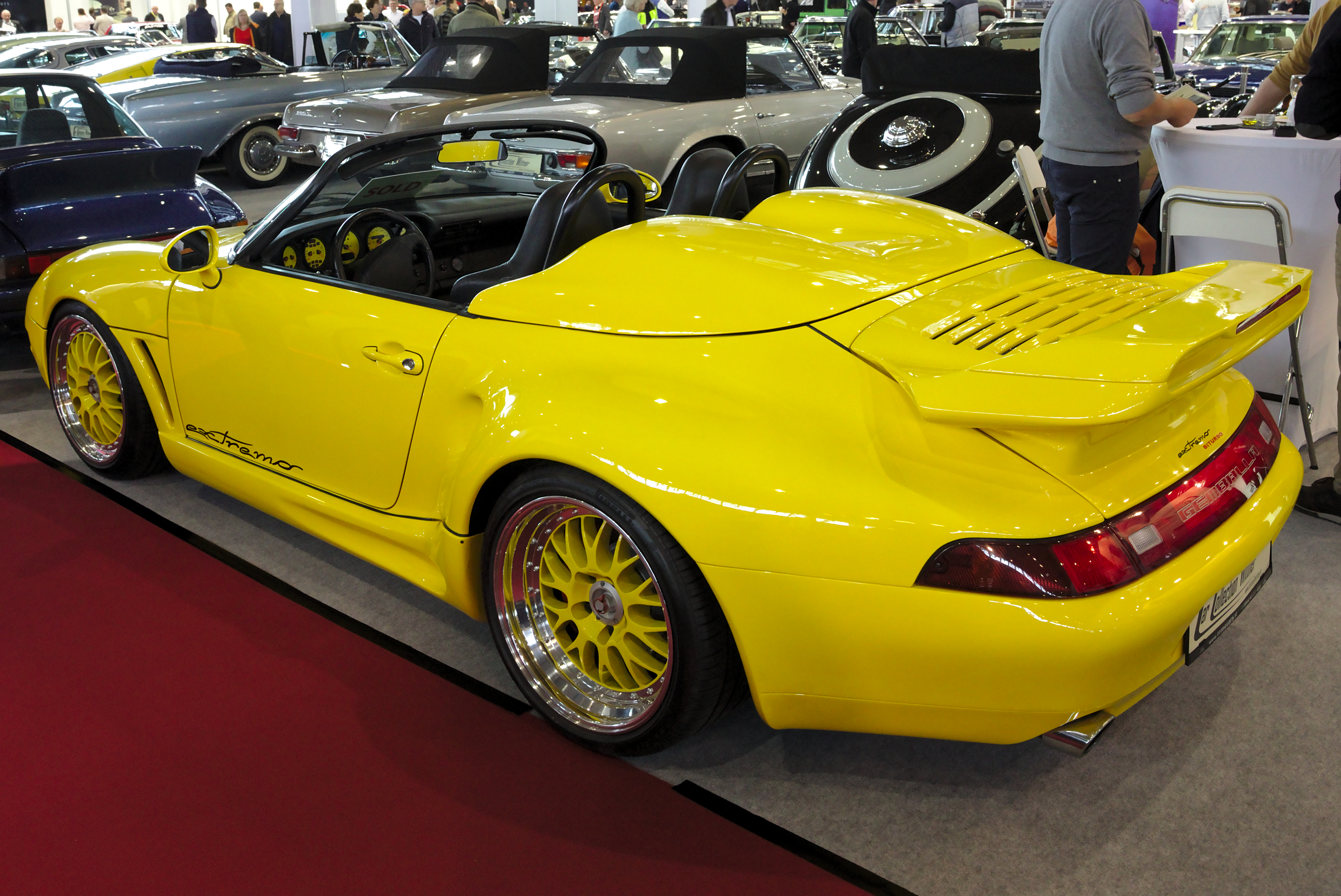
Gemballa Biturbo Speedster (based on the Porsche 911)

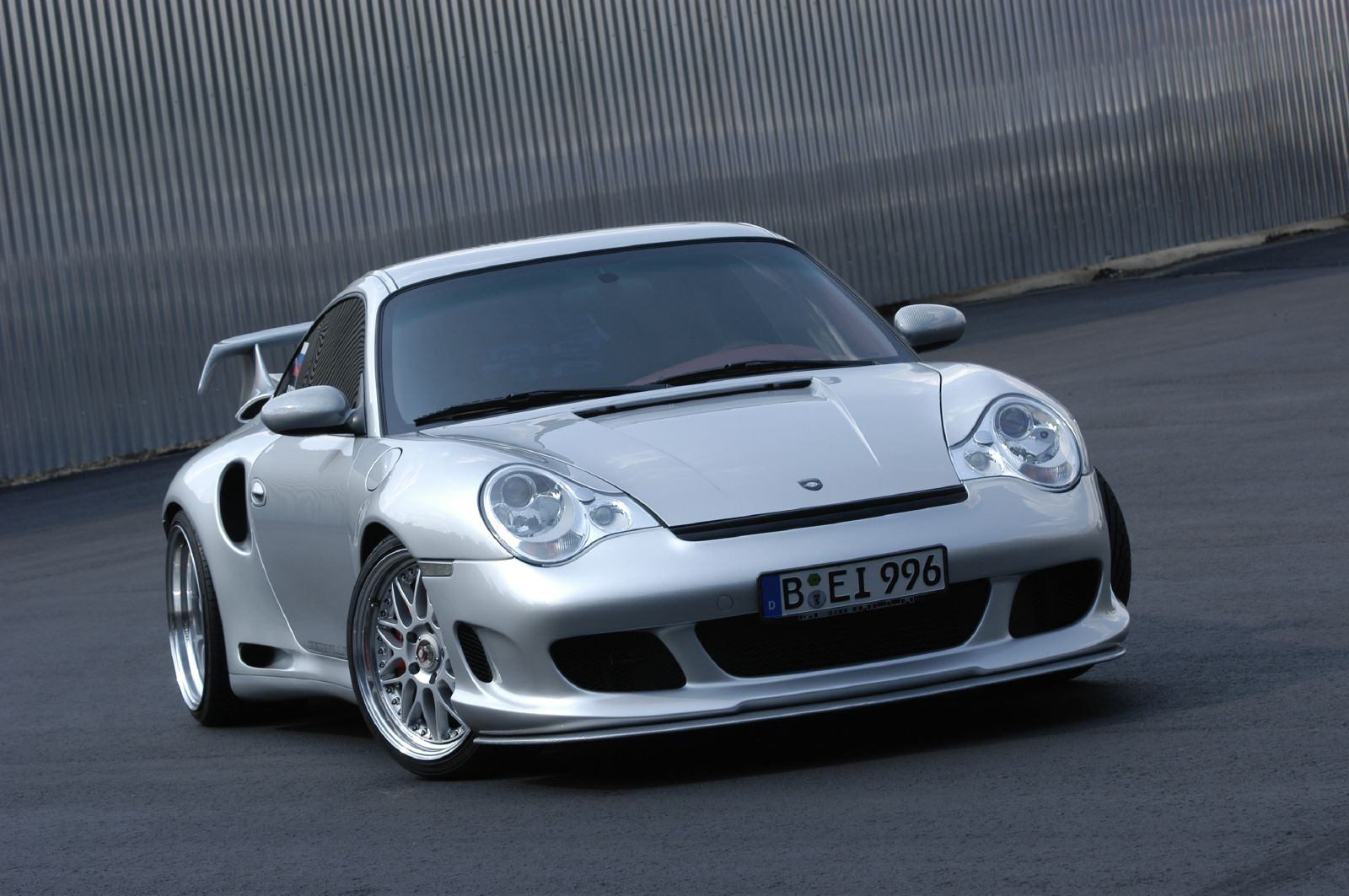
Gemballa GTR 650 Evo (based on the Porsche 911)

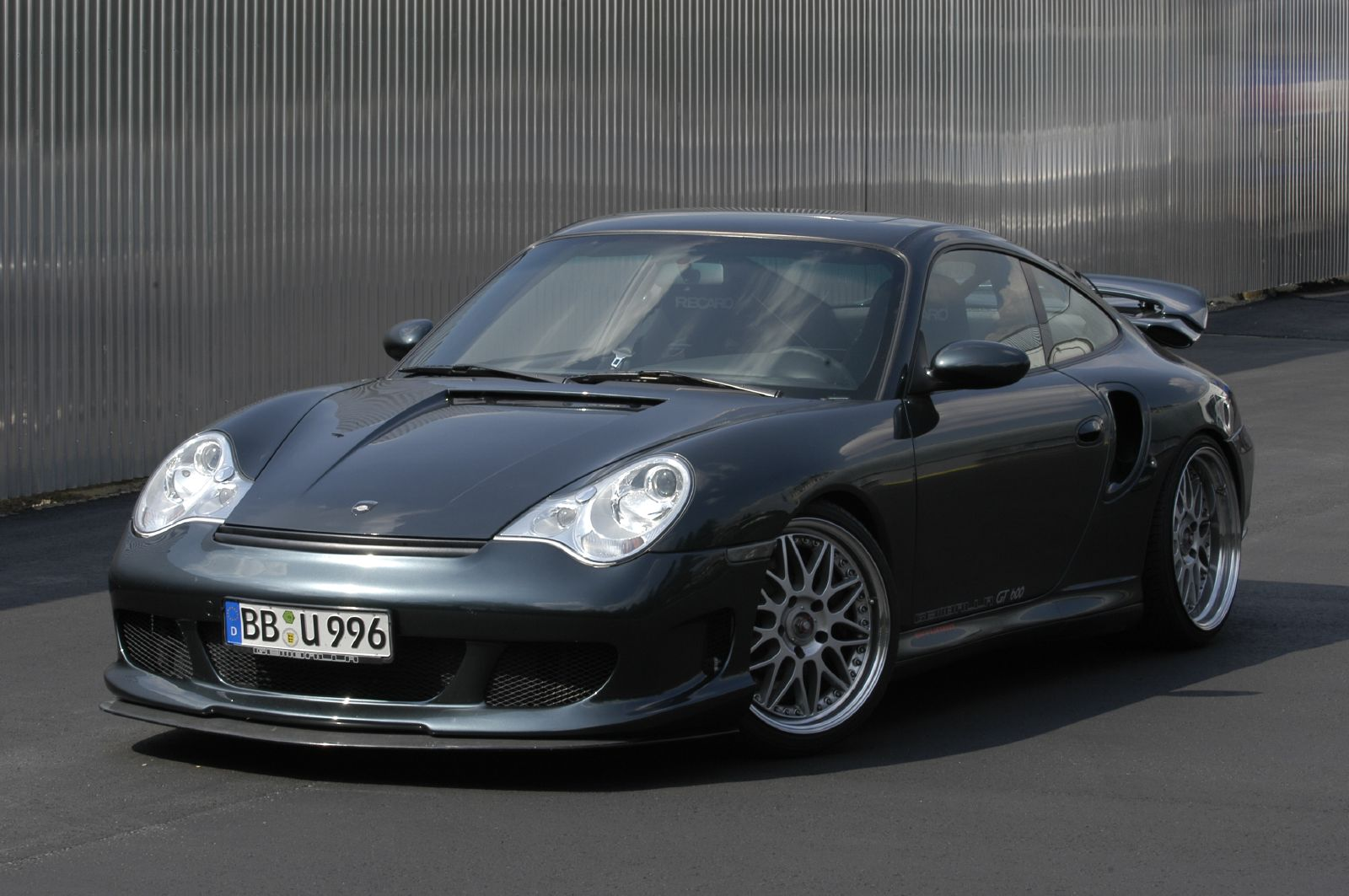
Gemballa-tuned Porsche 911

=== Avalanche, Cyrrus, and Mirage ===
In the 1980s, Gemballa introduced the Avalanche, based on the Porsche 911 (930) (Turbo 911 slant nose), and the Cyrrus (convertible), as well as the Mirage, which was similar to the Avalanche. The cars featured large wide body kits with side strakes (similar to the Ferrari Testarossa), upgraded wheels, interiors, gauges, paint, Hi-Fi audio systems, and more. Some vehicles even used cameras instead of mirrors, a new technology at the time. Audio company Pioneer used Gemballa vehicles in their advertisements and brochures for several years. The prices for these vehicles were often mentioned as being incredibly high for the time period - at US$250K-$375K+. Robert Van Winkle, also known as Vanilla Ice, was a notable owner of Gemballa Porsches.

In the 1990s, Gemballa's body kits were more subtle compared to the 80s. They continued to perform engine modifications and opened up a US facility in California.

=== 911 RS America ===
In 2005 a white Gemballa 911 RS America led a parade of approximately 30 other RS Americas at the Porsche Parade in Hershey, PA, US. It was the largest gathering ever of Porsche RS Americas.

=== Mirage GT ===
Introduced in 2007, the Mirage GT is a modified version of the Porsche Carrera GT produced by Gemballa. Rumors originally suggested that when the car was produced it would have upwards of 800 horsepower (600 kW); however, the Mirage GT's only performance modification is a quad pipe stainless steel exhaust system which boosts power to 645 hp (481 kW), 40 hp more than the stock Carrera GT. The stock Carrera GT only had two exhaust pipes, so the additional two pipes in the Mirage GT are where the reverse and fog warning lamps used to be (they relocated the two lamps to beneath the rear diffuser). Other modifications include a roof mounted air-intake that goes into the engine bay, a Gemballa Sport Clutch, a rear wing with an electronic center section, a carbon fiber hardtop, carbon fiber body panels, Gemballa wheels and a redesigned front fascia, rear fascia and side skirts. At the time, company owner Uwe Gemballa said that a twin-turbo version was in the works. Modified Luxury & Exotics magazine described the car as "one of the finest automobiles we've ever featured." 25 Mirage GTs were produced in total.

=== Avalanche GTR 800 Evo-R ===
The Gemballa Avalanche GTR800 EVO-R is a car based on the 911 (997) GT2. Like the name suggests, it produces about 800 bhp (600 kW) thanks to two turbochargers and highly modified engine components.

=== Mistrale ===
The Gemballa Mistrale is a modified version of the Porsche Panamera Turbo developed by Gemballa. Introduced in 2009, the Mistrale features a full carbon fibre body kit, 22-inch forged wheels, and upgraded brakes and suspension. Engine tuning options boost power output up to 750 hp and 1,000 Nm of torque, enabling 0–100 km/h (62 mph) acceleration in around 3.2 seconds and a top speed of over 338 km/h (210 mph). Only 30 units were planned, each offering a fully customized interior and exterior design.

=== Cayenne GT500, GT600 and GT750 ===
Gemballa also offered a modification package for the first generation Porsche Cayenne Turbo. This package features a number of engine modifications, including revised turbochargers, coolers (oil and pressurized air IC) and a large collection of engine components including pistons and seals. These allow the Cayenne to produce up to around 750 brake horsepower. The kit also features a number of exterior modifications. The number of full conversion Cayennes is very low.

A grey GT 600 model was driven by Gemballa in the Gumball 3000 rally and personally owned by Uwe Gemballa.

=== MIG-U1 ===
The Gemballa MIG‑U1 is an ultra‑limited bespoke supercar built by German tuning firm Gemballa, based on the Ferrari Enzo. Commissioned by Dubai collectors Mustafa and Ilyas Galadari—whose initials inspired the name "MIG"—the project was originally intended for 25 examples, but only a single prototype was completed.

Gemballa enhanced the Enzo's normally aspirated 6.0 L V12 engine from approximately 660 hp to around 700 hp, with torque raised to roughly 720 Nm. Performance includes a 0–100 km/h sprint in about 3.1 seconds and a top speed exceeding 360 km/h.

The bodywork is entirely reimagined in carbon fibre with an aerodynamic design inspired by fighter aircraft—its front is widened by ~80 mm and the rear by ~100 mm. An adjustable rear wing and front splitter produce substantial downforce gains (up to ~35 kg front, ~85 kg rear). The car features active hydraulics that raise the ride height by approximately 45 mm at the touch of a button or automatically above 80 km/h for better ground clearance.

Additional mechanical upgrades include forged lightweight wheels that reduce unsprung mass by ~16 kg. The interior is fully customized, featuring high‑grade leather and suede trim, a bespoke center console, sports seats, a seven‑inch touchscreen multimedia unit with navigation and iPod integration, and a 950‑watt audio system with subwoofer.

== Current Gemballa cars ==
The actual Gemballa cars are predominantly based on Porsche and McLaren cars:

- Gemballa Avalanche based on Porsche 997
- Gemballa Tornado based on Porsche Cayenne
- Gemballa GT Aero 1/2/3 based on Porsche Cayenne
- Gemballa Mirage GT based on Porsche Carrera GT
- Gemballa Mistrale based on Porsche Panamera
- Gemballa GT based on Porsche 991
- Gemballa GT based on McLaren MP4-12C

== Death of Uwe Gemballa ==
On February 17, 2010, it was reported that Uwe Gemballa had gone missing in Johannesburg, South Africa while on a business trip. In October 2010, Gemballa was found dead west of Pretoria, having been suffocated and wrapped in plastic. It is suspected that his murder was a result of a money laundering operation which turned against him. Others maintain that Gemballa was murdered because he had refused to participate in a criminal activity. On October 29, 2010, Thabiso Mpshe, 28, from Pretoria, pleaded guilty to charges related to his involvement in the murder of Uwe Gemballa in Johannesburg. Under the terms of the plea agreement, he was sentenced to 20 years in prison. In 2015, three additional men, Thabo Mogapi, Kagiso Ledwaba and Garlond Holworthy, were also convicted of charges relating to the kidnap and murder of Gemballa. Their sentencing hearing began on 30 November 2015, and the mastermind is suspected to be Czech criminal Radovan Krejčíř.

== Gemballa Racing (2011–present) ==
Gemballa established its racing division called Gemballa Racing in 2011, using McLaren MP4-12C GT3 vehicles instead of Porsches. They are scheduled to race in FIA GT3 European Championship in 2012.
