= Případy 1. oddělení =

- Genre: Crime
- Written by: Josef Mareš; Jan Malinda
- Directed by: Dan Wlodarczyk; Peter Bebjak
- Starring: Ondřej Vetchý; Bolek Polívka; Filip Blažek
- Country of origin: Czech Republic
- Original language: Czech
- No. of seasons: 3
- No. of episodes: 35

Production
- Running time: 61 minutes

Original release
- Network: ČT1
- Release: 2014 – 2022

Related
- Nineties

Případy 1. oddělení (Cases of the 1st Department in English) is a Czech crime television series. The series is based on real criminal cases investigated by Czech Police. People involved in screenwriting of the series include Jan Malinda (journalist MF Dnes) and Josef Mareš (chief investigator of the real 1st department). The series was selected the best Czech crime television series in last decade. Main characters are based on real life investigators and other people. The cases reflect some of the most famous real criminal cases of the modern Czech Republic. The Series was renewed for third season to be aired in 2022. Season 3 concluded on 28 November 2022.

== Cast ==
=== Main ===
- Ondřej Vetchý as mjr. Tomáš Kozák
- Boleslav Polívka as mjr. Václav Plíšek
- Filip Blažek as kpt. Martin Pražák
- Petr Stach as kpt. Petr Anděl
- Miroslav Vladyka as por. Vítězslav Sršeň
- Miroslav Hanuš as mjr. Josef Korejs
- Igor Chmela as mjr. Dušan Vrána (since season 2)
- Barbora Bočková as kpt. Bc. Adéla Čulíková (season 3)
- Juraj Loj as kpt. Mgr. Jiří Netík (season 3)

=== Supporting ===
- Igor Bareš as plk. Vladimír Jeřábek
- Ondřej Malý as MUDr. Karel Vojíř
- Sabina Remundová as JUDr. Anna Švihlíková, prosecutor
- Jan Meduna as por. Ondřej Kavalír
- Petra Hřebíčková as Andrea Skopcová, journalist

== Episodes ==
Season	Episodes	Originally aired	
Season	Episodes	First aired	Last aired
1	14	6 January 2014	7 April 2014
2	8	4 January 2016	22 February 2016
3	13	5 September 2022	28 November 2022

== Production ==
The series began filming on March 18, 2013, and continued filming until December 2013. The series was produced by Czech Television and Michal Reitler's creative production group. Police offices, prosecutor's office, newsroom, autopsy room, cells and other buildings or rooms seen were built on one of the floors of the former Komerční banka building in Sokolovská street in Prague 9. Some episodes also feature real crime scenes; 149 actors appeared in the first series and it was filmed on 237 locations over a period of 284 days.

First ideas for the series came up in 2008, half a year later Jan Malinda found a policeman who was also willing to join the project, colonel of the Prague Police Directorate, Ing. Josef Mareš, who later became the official screenwriter. In the first episode, he played a short extra role as a uniformed police officer, and although he spent 23 years with the Police of the Czech Republic, he wore the uniform for the first time. In the tenth episode, he played a short extra role as one of the investigators. The series' working title was Homicide.

The character of Miroslav Vladyka was originally intended as a supporting role; after the pilot, the creators decided to include Vladyka as one of the main characters.

The second season was filmed from 1 March 2015 to 13 July 2015. Filming completed in August 2015; it lasted 80 days.

The third season was filmed from 10 May 2021 to 1 March 2022

=== Shooting locations ===
The first and third season were filmed in and around Prague while the second season was filmed in and around Prague, Plzeň, Tábor, Jihlava, some locations in Moravia and also in Dresden and elsewhere in Saxony.

== Prequel ==
Czech Television started to broadcast tv series called Nineties in January 2022. It serves as a prequel to Případy 1. oddělení with some characters reappearing while being recast by younger actors.

== Reception ==
The series was ranked in a poll among iDNES.cz readers as the best Czech crime series of the decade.
