= Prachovice =

- Municipality
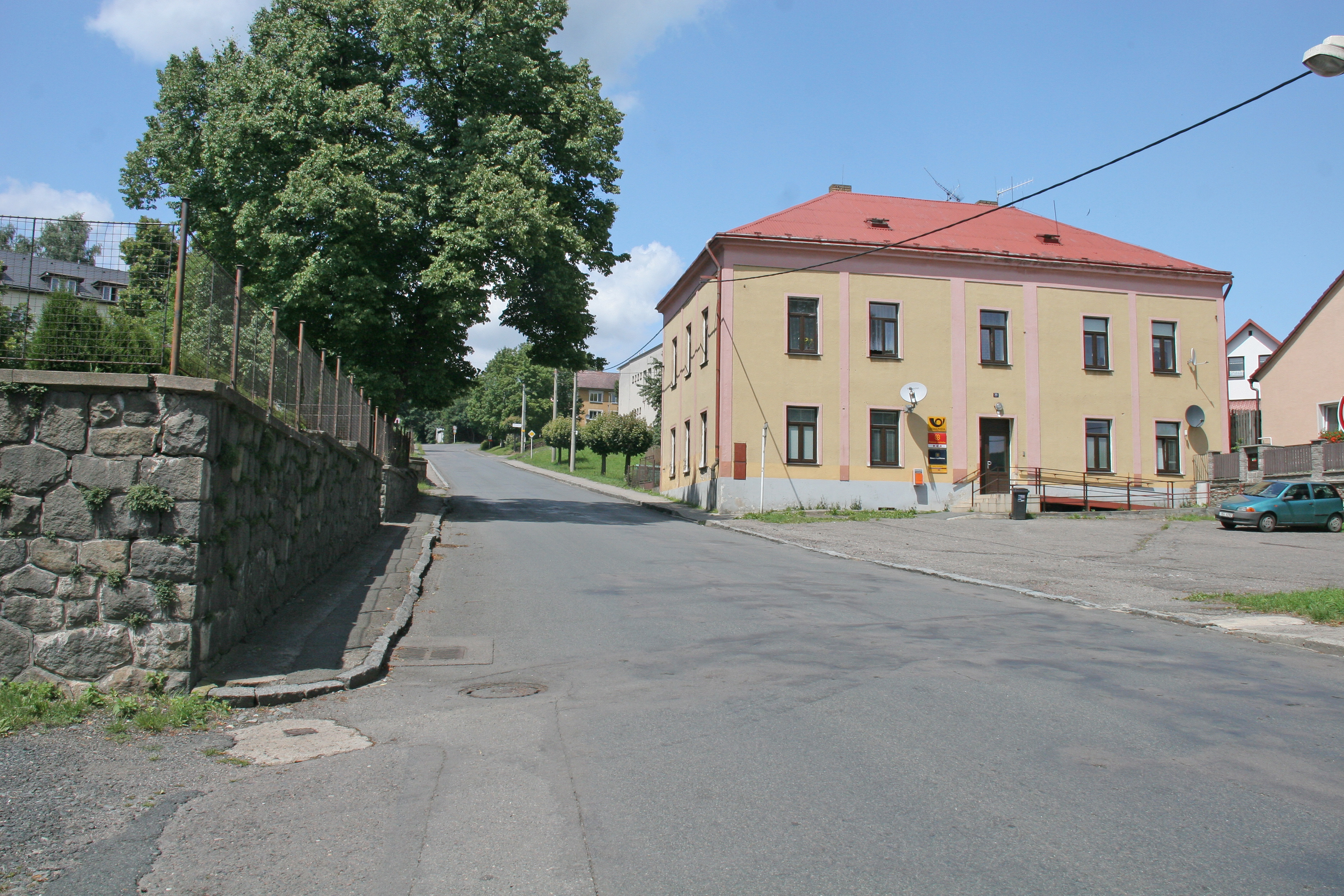
- Post office

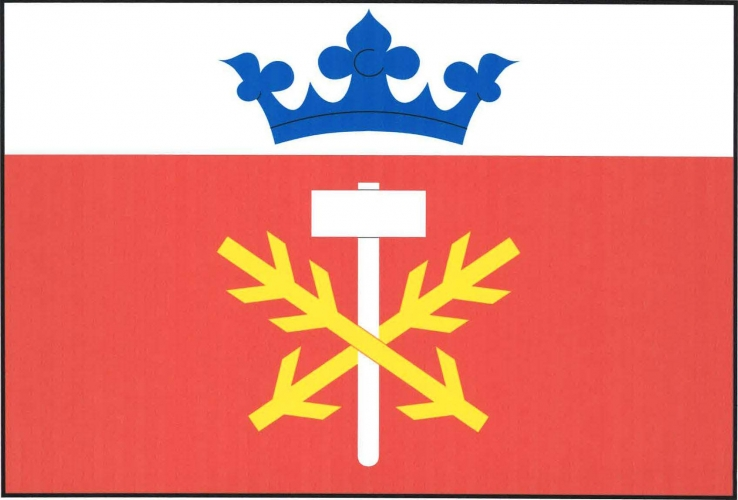
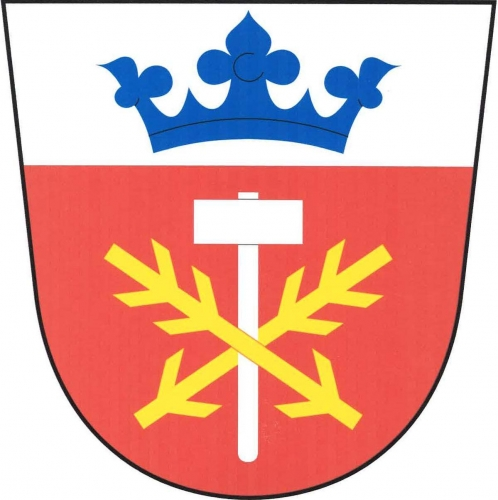
- Flag Coat of arms

- Location in the Czech Republic
- Coordinates: 49°53′38″N 15°37′44″E
- Country: Czech Republic
- Region: Pardubice
- District: Chrudim
- First mentioned: 1398

Area
  - Total: 5.32 km^{2} (2.05 sq mi)
- Elevation: 456 m (1,496 ft)

Population (2026-01-01)
  - Total: 1,404
  - Density: 264/km^{2} (684/sq mi)
- Time zone: UTC+1 (CET)
  - Summer (DST): UTC+2 (CEST)
- Postal code: 538 04
- Website: www.obecprachovice.cz

Prachovice is a municipality and village in Chrudim District in the Pardubice Region of the Czech Republic. It has about 1,400 inhabitants.

== Demographics ==
Historical population
Year	Pop.	±%
1869	601	—
1880	679	+13.0%
1890	821	+20.9%
1900	764	−6.9%
1910	838	+9.7%
1921	733	−12.5%
1930	619	−15.6%
1950	506	−18.3%
1961	1,312	+159.3%
1970	1,244	−5.2%
1980	1,236	−0.6%
1991	1,546	+25.1%
2001	1,557	+0.7%
2011	1,407	−9.6%
2021	1,367	−2.8%
Source: Censuses

== Economy ==
Prachovice is known for limestone quarrying and cement production. The quarry with an area of 111.2 hectares (275 acres) is one of the largest in the country. About 1,700,000 tonnes per year is quarried.

== Notable people ==
- Jiří Kajínek (born 1961), murderer and celebrity
