= Nineties (TV series) =

- Genre: Crime
- Written by: Josef Mareš
- Directed by: Peter Bebjak
- Starring: Martin Finger; Ondřej Sokol; Kryštof Bartoš
- Country of origin: Czech Republic
- Original language: Czech
- No. of seasons: 1
- No. of episodes: 6

Production
- Executive producer: Matěj Stehlík
- Producer: Michal Reitler
- Cinematography: Martin Žiaran
- Editor: Marek Kráľovský
- Running time: 61 minutes

Original release
- Network: ČT1
- Release: 2022

Related
- Případy 1. oddělení

Nineties (Czech: Devadesátky) is a Czech crime television series that serves as a prequel to Případy 1. oddělení. The series is based on real criminal cases investigated by Czech Police. Main characters are based on real life investigators and other people. The cases reflect some of the most famous real criminal cases of the modern Czech Republic (Ivan Jonák, Orlík killers). Nineties became most watched Czech TV series since 2004 with average viewership of 2.23 millions viewers older 15 years and with an average audience share of 47.51%.

== Cast ==
=== Main ===
- Kryštof Bartoš as por. Tomáš Kozák
- Martin Finger as kpt. Václav Plíšek
- Ondřej Sokol as npor. František Tůma
- Vasil Fridrich as mjr. Ivan Pauřík
- Robert Mikluš as npor. Josef Korejs

=== Supporting ===
- Patricie Pagáčová as Ivana Kozáková
- Štěpánka Fingerhutová as prostitute Jana
- Bořek Slezáček as Alexej
- Kateřina Marešová as Lucie Nováková
- Martin Stránský as plk. Otakar Duchoň
- Pavel Batěk as plk. Martin Zelňák
- Martin Davídek as kpt. Michal Švarc
- Jan Kolařík as MUDr. Rudolf Beneš
- Daniel Rous as Hacki
- Daniel Margolius as npor. Aleš Dobrý
- Michal Novotný as Ivan Jonák
- Albert Čuba as František Mrázek
- Richard Němec as Antonín Běla
- Tomáš Turek as Jan Janovský
- Zdeněk Stadtherr as Lumír Verner
- Igor Orozovič as Karel Kopáč
- Matouš Ruml as Ludvík Černý
- Viktor Zavadil as Petr Chodounský
- Jaroslav Tomáš as Vladimír Kuna
- Jakub Štáfek as Jiří Jíva
- David Šír as Miroslav Königsmark
- Tomáš Kobr as Tomáš Jeřábek
- Jiří Křižan as Josef Vrabec
- Marta Falvey Sovová as Ludvika Jonáková
- Jana Provázková as Iveta Suchá
- Karel Jirák as Marcel Štiller
- Michael Aleš Bucifal as Jiří Tokár
- Luboš Balog as Jan Balog
- Tomáš Mrvík as Michal Souček
- Klára Miklasová as Lenka Kulichová
- Anna Janečková Bazgerová as neighbor Marie
- Radek Polák as npor. Rudolf Kovář
- Miroslav Čáslavka as npor. Honza Němec
- Matej Landl as diver Jura
- František Strnad as navigator Saša
- František Večeřa as the lead diver

== Episodes ==
No.	Title	Directed by	Written by	Original release date	Czech viewers (millions)
1	"Poprava bodyguarda"	Peter Bebjak	Josef Mareš	9 January 2022	1.883
2	"Král diskoték"	Peter Bebjak	Josef Mareš	16 January 2022	2.064
3	"Kleopatra"	Peter Bebjak	Josef Mareš	23 January 2022	1.978
4	"Přehrada"	Peter Bebjak	Josef Mareš	30 January 2022	2.089
5	"Sudy"	Peter Bebjak	Josef Mareš	6 February 2022	2.293
6	"Přiznání"	Peter Bebjak	Josef Mareš	13 February 2022	2.269
