= Profesor Indigo =

1983 song by Peter Nagy

- Professor Indigo, played by Andrej Hryc in the music video

Song by Peter Nagy
- Language: Slovak
- English title: Professor Indigo
- Released: 1983; 43 years ago
- Recorded: 1982
- Studio: Slovenský rozhlas, Košice, Czechoslovakia
- Length: 2:32

"Profesor Indigo" (English: Professor Indigo) is a song written by Slovak musician Peter Nagy released on Opus Records in 1983.

The first time Nagy recorded a song in a studio was as a 17-year-old, recording in the studio of Slovak Radio in Košice in 1982; however, the song was released only in the following year, becoming a hit in the country and launching Nagy's musical career.

The song describes a man in a blue coat, nicknamed Professor Indigo, inspired by a math teacher from the Gymnázium Jána Adama Raymana, where Nagy studied.

== Background ==
After completing high school in Prešov, Nagy attended the Faculty of Philosophy at Pavol Jozef Šafárik University. He initially pursued a career as a folk singer. At the age of seventeen, he recorded his first song in a studio. He performed with eastern Slovak bands such as Profily, Fultura, and the group Karla Witz. Nagy's breakthrough came with the song Profesor Indigo, which brought him public recognition. He recorded this track in August 1982 at the Košice Radio studio, collaborating with guitarist Karel Witz, who had previously worked with bands like Collegium Musicum and Modus. After releasing a year later, the song was a hit in Czechoslovakia, topping all of the charts. In November 1983, Nagy founded a band called Indigo, named after his hit.

In 2020, a remake of the song was created. It was included in Nagy's new album, Aj tak sme frajeri.

In an interview in 2025, Nagy revealed the professor in the song was a real-life figure, a mathematics professor at the school which taught Nagy, stating that "He didn't understand that I was out of touch with reality. I don't have exact thinking, like at all. I'm always out of touch somewhere. I just got a D in math because he couldn't teach me, and that created a nervousness between us. So, while I finished elementary school with straight A's, in high school I got two D's and seven C's. Because I was completely out of touch with reality, even for the professors, because I already had long hair and stuff. And they were nervous about that".

== Music video ==
Following the song's success, a music video was made by the television song show 5xP in 1983. It was directed by the well-known music director Jozef Kaiser, featuring Andrej Hryc in the main role as Professor Indigo. During this period, the TV hit parade 5 × P and the Military Art Ensemble included the music video of Profesor Indigo in the March round of the competition, where it would finish in first place, winning the contest.
