= Docent (miniseries) =

- Genre: Crime
- Written by: Josef Mareš; Jan Malinda
- Directed by: Jiří Strach
- Starring: Ivan Trojan; Tereza Ramba; Ondřej Vetchý
- Country of origin: Czech Republic
- Original language: Czech
- No. of seasons: 2
- No. of episodes: 6

Production
- Running time: 90–94 minutes

Original release
- Network: ČT1
- Release: February 5, 2023 – present

Docent is a Czech crime television series. Doc. Otto Stehlík tracks down a cold-blooded serial killer as an investigator with unconventional but all the more functional strategy. Stehlík and his professional partner Monika Fousová represent a rather incongruous couple. Jan Malinda and Josef Mareš have written the script. Jiří Strach took over the direction. The first episode premiered on 5 February 2023 on ČT1. and was presented on 12 January in Prague's bio přítomnost. Director Strach revealed there that season 2 is in development and could start filming in the fall of the same year. Shooting of season 2 started in October 2023. Czech television started considering third season at the time. Third season is scheduled for 2026.

== Plot ==
=== Season 1 ===
Unexpected circumstances lead docent Stehlík to the team of the Prague murder party, which is headed by the pragmatic Major Šera. Stehlík is a police academic and a specialist in the psychological profiling of criminals. He shares an office with problematic Captain Fousová. Their attitude towards life, investigative methods and personal esprit are completely different. Their differences still lead them to reveal the perpetrator of so far unsolved murders and to a surprising connection with the current case which is investigated by their colleagues Málek and Plesl.

=== Season 2 ===
Set 2 years after events of first season. Docent Stehlík lectures at the police academy while Fousová works at the police presidium. Šera still leads Prague murder party. Cold-blooded murder of young woman forces him to reopen a case from 1990s and ask Stehlík for help with the investigation.

=== Season 3 ===
Docent Stehlík works with investigators on two complex cases of missing people while Captain Fousová reconnects with her former colleagues, because both cases have some connection abroad.

== Cast ==
=== Main ===
- Ivan Trojan as docent Otto Stehlík
- Tereza Ramba as policewoman Monika Fousová
- Ondřej Vetchý as investigator Milan Šera
- Matěj Hádek as policeman Jaroslav Málek
- Marek Taclík as policeman Dan Plesl
- Alois Švehlík as Václav Stehlík, Stehlík's father (Season 1)
- Lenka Vlasáková as Anna Stehlíková, Otto Stehlík's ex-wife
- Miroslav Etzler as medical examiner Jiří Hladký
- Jan Hrušínský as Miloš Fous, Fousová's father
- Josef Mareš as PhDr. Ing. Marek Tomášek, MBA
- Tomáš Kozák as Ing. Petr Volf, Ph.D.
- Elizaveta Maximová as Oxana Vosátková
- Petr Stach as Jan Vosátka
- Oldřich Navrátil as Bohumil Lukášek
- Peter Varga as Jiří Váchal

== Episodes ==
=== Season 1 (2023) ===
No. overall	No. in season	Title	Directed by	Written by	Original release date	Czech viewers (millions)
1	1	"Lesní vražda"	Jiří Strach	Josef Mareš, Jan Malinda	February 5, 2023	2,023
2	2	"Preso s mlíčkem"	Jiří Strach	Josef Mareš, Jan Malinda	February 12, 2023	1,873
3	3	"Rozhodnutí"	Jiří Strach	Josef Mareš, Jan Malinda	February 19, 2023	1,920

=== Season 2 (2024) ===
No. overall	No. in season	Title	Directed by	Written by	Original release date	Czech viewers (millions)
4	1	"Sladká odměna"	Jiří Strach	Josef Mareš, Jan Malinda	September 1, 2024	1,225
5	2	"Trilobit v akci"	Jiří Strach	Josef Mareš, Jan Malinda	September 8, 2024	1.184
6	3	"Zvláštní opatření"	Jiří Strach	Josef Mareš, Jan Malinda	September 15, 2024	1.342
