= Kajínek =

2010 Czech action drama film

- Directed by: Petr Jákl
- Written by: Petr Jákl; Marek Dobeš
- Produced by: Petr Jákl; Igor Konyukov
- Starring: Konstantin Lavronenko
- Cinematography: F. A. Brabec
- Edited by: Matous Outrata
- Music by: Vaclav Barta
- Release date: 5 August 2010
- Country: Czech Republic
- Language: Czech

Kajínek is a 2010 Czech action drama film directed by Petr Jákl. The film received an award at the Festival International du Film Policier de Liege 2011. The film is based on the story of Jiří Kajínek, who managed to escape from a strictly guarded prison in the Mírov fortress.

== Cast ==
- Konstantin Lavronenko as Jiří Kajínek (voiced by Jan Šťastný)
- Tatiana Vilhelmová as JUDr. Klára Pokorová
- Bogusław Linda as Mr. Doležal (voiced by Jan Vondráček)
- Vladimír Dlouhý as Novotný
- Michal Dlouhý as Lejčko
- Ken Duken as Bukovský (voiced by Jaromír Nosek)
- Václav Noid Bárta as Venca Křížek
- Alice Bendová as Alice Křížková
- Werner Daehn as Perner
- Deana Horváthová as Judge
- Hynek Čermák as Prison Officer Pakosta
- Jana Krausová as Mrs. Doležalová
- Daniel Daden Svoboda as Commander of URNA
