= Radovan Krejčíř =

Czech criminal (born 1968)

- Born: November 4, 1968 (age 58); Dolní Žukov, Czechoslovakia (now Czech Republic)
- Other name: Egbert Jules Savy
- Education: Technical University of Ostrava
- Status: 15.5 years in the Czech Republic; 35 years in South Africa
- Convictions: Fraud, attempted murder of Czech government official, attempted bribery, money counterfeiting
- Criminal charges: Fraud, kidnapping, attempted murder, conspiracy to commit murder, murder, racketeering
- Wanted by: Government of the Czech Republic

Details
- Imprisoned at: Kgosi Mampuru Prison, South Africa

Radovan Krejčíř (born 4 November 1968) is a Czech former organized crime boss and convicted criminal who is serving a prison term in South Africa and is being sought for extradition by the Czech government. He has been sentenced to 15.5 years in the Czech Republic and 35 years in South Africa.

He became rich through criminal activity during the 1990s and was considered one of the richest people in the Czech Republic. Krejčíř fled from the country shortly after being arrested in June 2005 and resided in the Seychelles. In 2012, he was sentenced in absentia to eight years of imprisonment for fraud totalling CZK 108,000,000. In November, 2013, he was arrested and charged with kidnapping and attempted murder in South Africa. The trial started in May 2014. In August 2015, he was found guilty of attempted murder, assault and kidnapping, among other things. Other trials are still in progress. In Johannesburg, on 23 February 2016, Radovan Krejčíř has been sentenced to 35 years in jail.

== Biography ==
His criminal activities began in the early 1990s, following the Velvet Revolution. He co-founded the company Corado and amassed great wealth during the Czech voucher privatization. His activities and companies were monitored by the police since the mid-1990s, due to suspicion of illegal money transfers.

In June 2005, the police raided his luxury villa in Černošice and arrested him in association with a planned murder of a customs officer, fraud and criminal conspiracy. Krejčíř fled the house during the police intervention, which later led to the resignation of the Czech Police President Jiří Kolář. In September, 2005, Interpol traced him and his family in the Seychelles.

In April 2007, he moved to South Africa under the false name Egbert Jules Savy. He was arrested and taken into custody at O. R. Tambo International Airport in Johannesburg. The Czech Republic started negotiations about his extradition with the South African authorities, however, South Africa did not allow the extradition, as it was alleged he had paid bribes to the necessary judge. He is wanted for tax fraud and conspiracy to murder in the Czech Republic.

In South Africa, Krejčíř established contacts with the local criminal scene. He himself became a target of an attack in July 2013, when his car was hit by a remote-control gun. He figured in the murder investigation of crime boss Cyril Beeka, who was killed in Cape Town in 2011. The South African media associate him with several other murders in the local underworld, and also the luring, abduction and murder of Stuttgart-based Gemballa automobile tuning factory's founder Uwe Gemballa. According to one report, Krejčíř was allegedly bringing money into South Africa in Gemballa cars.

Krejčíř was convicted for drug dealing, kidnapping, and attempted murder, and serves his sentence in Gauteng's Kgosi Mampuru Prison. On 31 March 2017, his Seychellois citizenship was revoked.

== Attempted prison escape ==
A number of illegal items were discovered on 26 September 2015 in an apparent raid of a number of prison cells including that of Krejčíř. Amongst the items found were a pistol, ammunition, a knife, an item that appeared to be a Taser, a pepper spray gun, screwdriver steel blade, ten cellphones, a memory stick, a diary which contained the names of witnesses and investigators in his cases and a sketch showing a detailed map of the prison building. The escape was to take place at his next court appearance in October 2015.

It was revealed that a staggering R246 million (US$18 million) had been made available to ensure the smooth escape of Krejčíř from prison. Three prison warders were paid R1.5 million to help expedite the prison break. Impeccable sources close to the investigation revealed that the three warders have already been identified and their arrest is imminent. Krejčíř has been moved to an underground isolation cell after it has been established that a helicopter was going to be used in the daring raid to free him. Some of the R246 million was used to pay for this helicopter to spirit Krejčíř away once he had escaped. A part of the money was also to be used to pay all the people, including the police, who were involved in the plan to spring him out of jail and some would have been used to pay for the landing rights for a chartered plane to fly him out of the country. Judge of Tribunal in Johannesburg Colin Lamont, condemned him on 23 February 2016 to 35 years in jail.

== In popular culture ==
Gangster Ka a Czech film directed by Jan Pachl, is inspired by the story of Radovan Krejčíř. The movie premiered in 2015.
