= Jinočany =

- Municipality
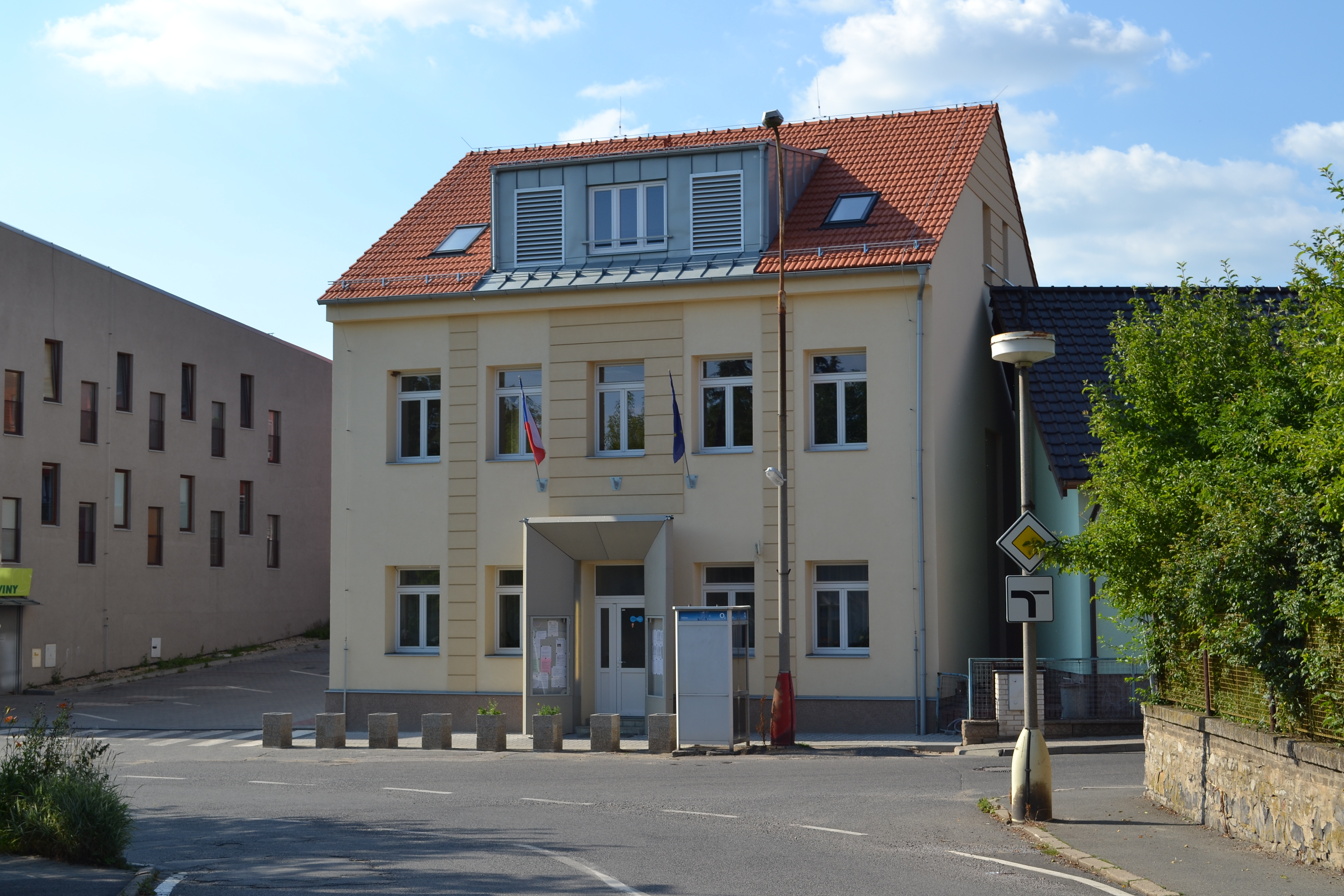
- Municipal office

- Flag Coat of arms

- Location in the Czech Republic
- Coordinates: 50°1′58″N 14°16′7″E
- Country: Czech Republic
- Region: Central Bohemian
- District: Prague-West
- First mentioned: 1406

Area
  - Total: 3.75 km^{2} (1.45 sq mi)
- Elevation: 357 m (1,171 ft)

Population (2026-01-01)
  - Total: 2,427
  - Density: 647/km^{2} (1,680/sq mi)
- Time zone: UTC+1 (CET)
  - Summer (DST): UTC+2 (CEST)
- Postal code: 252 25
- Website: www.jinocany.cz

Jinočany is a municipality and village in Prague-West District in the Central Bohemian Region of the Czech Republic. It has about 2,400 inhabitants.

== Etymology ==
The name was derived from the Old Czech word jinoci, meaning 'loners' or 'hermits'.

== Geography ==
Jinočany is located about 5 kilometres (3 mi) west of Prague. It lies in a flat agricultural landscape in the Prague Plateau. The highest point is at 401 m (1,316 ft) above sea level.

== History ==
The first written mention of Jinočany is from 1406, when half of the village was owned by the Břevnov Monastery. During feudal times, the village was divided into two parts that had different owners.

In 1845, iron ore began to be mined near Jinočany. At the end of the 19th century and the beginning of the 20th century, mining developed and caused the growth of the village and an influx of new residents. After World War I, mining was stopped due to the low iron content of the mined ore. In the years 1945–1964, mining was resumed, but it was unprofitable.

== Demographics ==
Historical population

Year	Pop.	±%
1869	213	—
1880	251	+17.8%
1890	364	+45.0%
1900	522	+43.4%
1910	756	+44.8%

Year	Pop.	±%
1921	704	−6.9%
1930	674	−4.3%
1950	531	−21.2%
1961	770	+45.0%
1970	787	+2.2%

Year	Pop.	±%
1980	817	+3.8%
1991	774	−5.3%
2001	792	+2.3%
2011	1,419	+79.2%
2021	2,245	+58.2%

Source: Censuses

== Transport ==
The D0 motorway (part of the European route E50) runs along the eastern municipal border.

Jinočany is located on the railway line Prague–Beroun.

== Sights ==
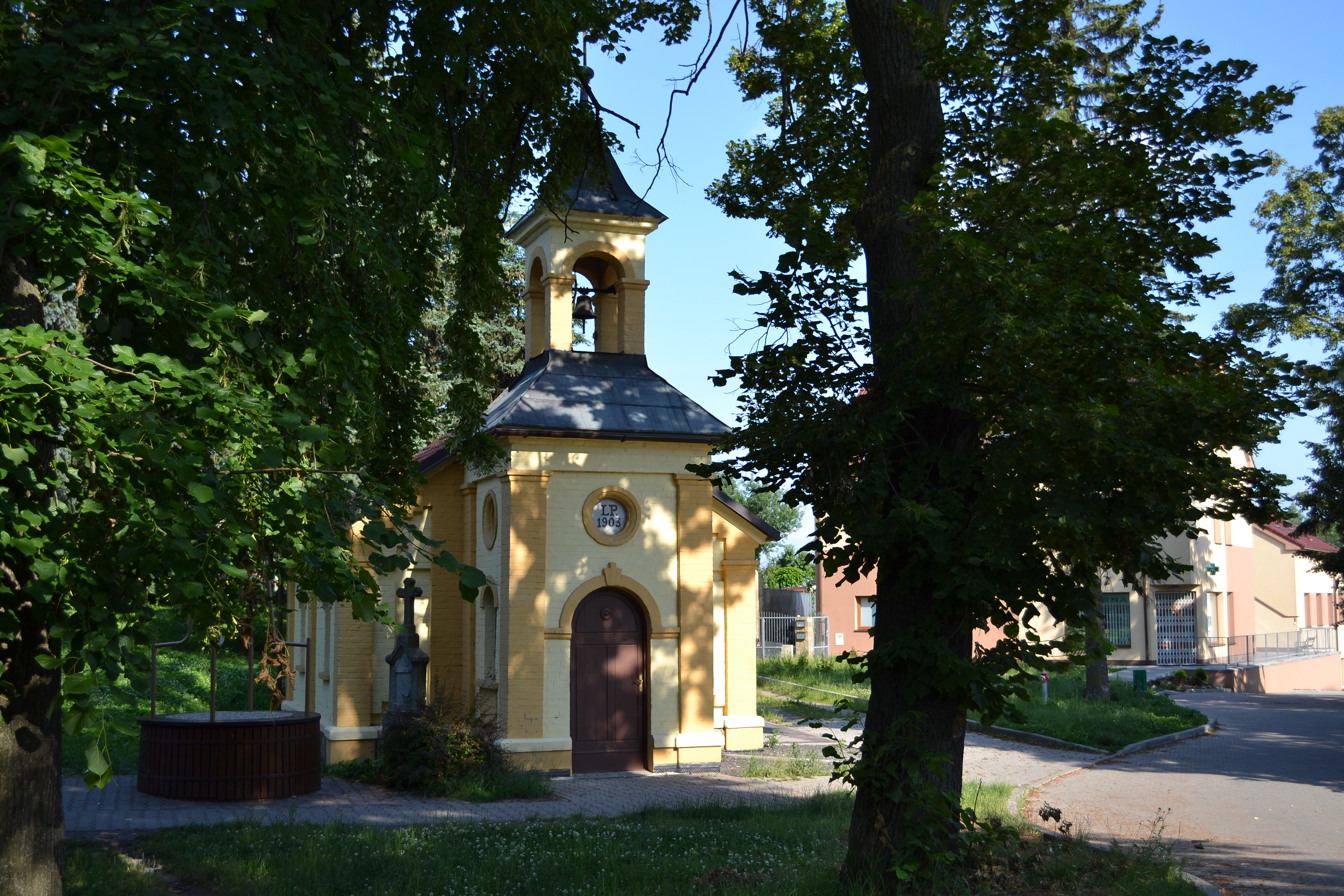
Chapel

There are no protected cultural monuments in the municipality. In the centre of Jinočany is a chapel.
