= František Mrázek =

Czech gangster (1958–2006)

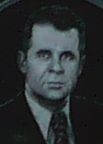
- Born: 1 February 1958; Český Brod, Czech Republic
- Died: 25 January 2006 (aged 47); Prague, Czech Republic
- Cause of death: Shot in the heart by a sniper
- Resting place: Český Brod, Czech Republic
- Citizenship: Czech
- Years active: 1958—2006
- Known for: Alleged Godfather of the Czech Organized Crime

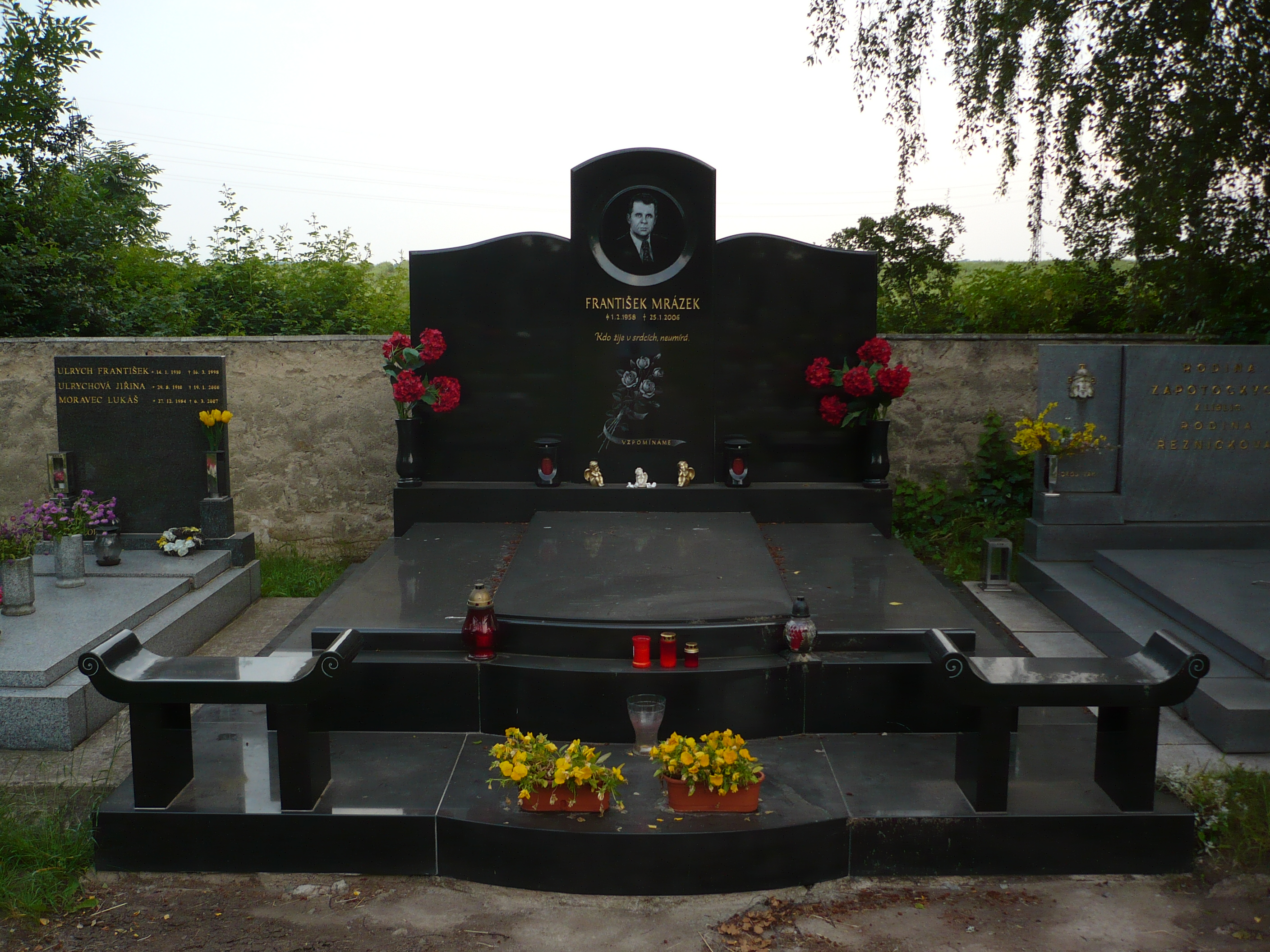
Mrázek's grave in Český Brod

František Mrázek (cs) (1 February 1958 – 25 January 2006 in Prague) was a controversial Czech entrepreneur, often referred to as the "Godfather of Czech Organized Crime". Mrázek covertly influenced Czech politics for almost twenty years. In 2006 he was assassinated by a (still unknown) sniper. Most of the publicly available information about his criminal activities and contacts with the politicians leaked from police archives (which include wiretapping records and Mrázek's own collection of blackmail material) after his death. These sources suspect he was involved in over 30 murders.

== Communist Czechoslovakia ==
Mrázek set up a smuggling business during the communist era. He "dealt" in a variety of articles including wristwatches, Walkmans and textiles of Western origin, and even with gravestones from Czech Jewish cemeteries. He was also involved in the criminal underground of the Kolín region as his name appeared in the circles of foreign currency speculators (Czech: veksláci). In 1986 Mrázek spent two months in custody and was subsequently sentenced to probation. In February 1987, Mrázek consented to cooperating with the criminal investigation department of Czechoslovak police. However, he himself was under surveillance by the Omega police team.

== Post-revolution ==
Following the Velvet Revolution of 1989 Mrázek at first focused on voucher privatization. Together with his business partners, he took the opportunity offered by the chaotic situation at the beginning of Czech economic transformation, and laundered the dirty money from the past. He later focused his business activities on real estate. Obtaining loans from Czech banks, often through a third party, Mrázek specialized in the buying and reselling of real estate. He dealt in buildings that were fraudulently overvalued, earning hundreds of millions in Czech currency. He established many similar companies owned by so-called "white horses" (bogus owners, usually with Russian names). He later transferred his assets to other firms in order to cover these fraudulent activities. The Czech police investigated his suspicions activities, however, their case was closed as inconclusive as Mrázek was not legally involved in any of the firms. From 1991 to 1994 František Mrázek managed to extract an astronomical amount of money from Czech banks - more than 1.14 billion Czech crowns.

At the beginning of the 1990s, Mrázek, together with famous Czech singer Karel Gott, established the foundation Interpo, dedicated to helping children of police officers killed in the line of duty. Gott however withdrew from the collaboration when the foundation fell under suspicion of dishonest financial transactions. Gott later stated that he "hadn't noticed Mrázek's connections with organized crime".

Mrázek socialized with many controversial entrepreneurs such as Tomáš Pitr and Miroslav Provod, both later convicted for tax fraud. In 2000 the Czech public television broadcaster Česká televize aired a report on Mrázek and Provod containing information about their connections to the bankruptcy of the major Czech bank, IPB, as well as to several small banks. In January 2000 Mrázek joined developer Luděk Sekyra in an attempt to acquire major Czech construction company IPS.

== Influence on Czech politics ==
Mrázek, together with another entrepreneur Tomáš Pitr, was considered the head of the financial group which controlled large chemical conglomerate SETUZA and the oil company Český olej (Czech oil). This group attempted (not only in connection with SETUZA) to influence the discharge of the Czech government for its own benefit. He was also involved in the case of "the resolution of the Russian debt", later called "the Czech fiddle of the century". He helped to arrange meetings between Czech and Russian politicians in that case. Russia owed the Czech Republic approximately 170 billion Czech crowns. Former Czech Minister of Finance Ivo Svoboda negotiated the sale of the debt with Austrian entrepreneur Barak Alon and also with Mrázek. The Czech government later signed an opaque contract with the corporation Falkon owned by Georgian entrepreneurs. Later, this corporation was also influenced by people connected with the former communist regime and former secret police department. The Russian government rendered about 50 billion Czech crowns, however, after opaque financial and bank operations only 20 billion came to Prague.

Mrázek's connections with Czech politics are documented on police wiretaps. He was under surveillance by the Czech anti-corruption police team many times; the largest police operation oriented to his person was called Krakatice (Giant squid), established in 1999 to investigate relations between Czech politicians and groups of organized crime. The case was closed in 2002 and information contained in it didn't help prove any allegations. However, shortly before Czech Parliament elections in 2006 some information from a file concerning contacts between Mrázek's close collaborator Igor Šafranko and politician Vlastimil Tlustý (former Czech Minister of Finance) spread to the public. Tlustý later stated that he wasn't involved in either corruption or organized crime, and he broke his contacts with negotiator Šafranko.

František Mrázek was in long-term contact with Miroslav Šlouf, the chief-consultant of former Czech Prime Minister Miloš Zeman. He also attempted to influence other Members of Czech Parliament including Ivan Langer, Minister of the Interior and Informatics of the Czech Republic. Langer later stated that he wasn't working in connection with Mrázek, and he rejected all speculation as "nonsense".

Mrázek was never accused or sentenced after 1989.

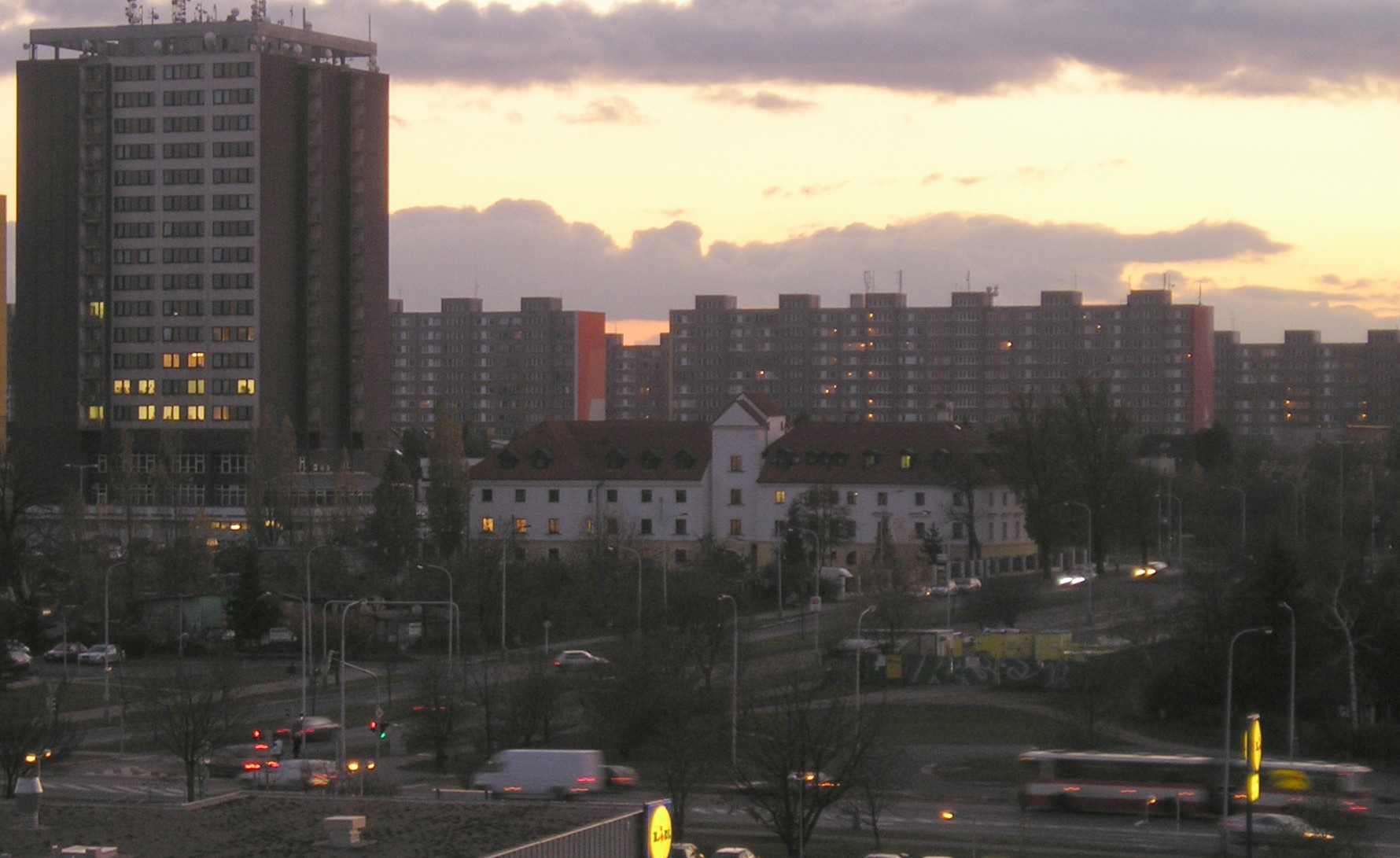
The building (center) in front of which František Mrázek was assassinated.

== Assassination ==
An attempt to murder Mrázek occurred in 2002. He was wounded, but survived (and since then used an armoured car). Later, on the Czech television report "Na stopě", Mrázek offered a two-million Czech crown reward for information leading to the attacker.

On 25 January 2006, František Mrázek was shot and killed by an unknown assailant in Durychova Street, Prague 4, in front of the registered office of his firms and companies. Only one shot was fired and Mrázek died almost immediately. The investigation into his death was postponed until December 2006 and the crime remains unsolved. According to the police investigation, he was shot with a sniper rifle by a professional assassin; the assassination was carefully and professionally planned.

== Post-death ==
Jaroslav Kmenta, the chief-reporter of the Czech daily newspaper Mladá Fronta Dnes, published information on František Mrázek in three books. The reliability of his investigation was, however, questioned and on 21 November 2008 Kmenta stated: "...in agreement with the editor-in-chief, I published only absolutely verified information, derived from various sources". The 2008 book Kmotr Kmenta (The Godfather Kmenta) by Přemysl Svora was published in response to the controversy.

The case of František Mrázek (Krakatice) wasn't investigated properly, even though three police chiefs and ministers were replaced in their posts. It is entirely possible that police and investigators worked under immense pressure and were forced to stop the investigation. According to Mladá Fronta Dnes the problem is that the file contains many names of prominent politicians of both leading parties in the Czech Republic: Civic Democratic Party and Czech Social Democratic Party. Former Czech premier Mirek Topolánek stated on 15 September 2008 in the Czech newspaper Hospodářské noviny: "The police and secret services - at least a part of them - may have wanted to resolve this case, but they were silenced or intimidated."

In February 2009, Karel Tichý, former elite detective of the Czech anti-corruption police, claimed that he wanted to speak publicly about the circumstances of alleged interconnection between organized crime and Czech politicians. However, Ivan Langer, Czech Minister of the Interior and Informatics, manifested that he would refuse his request. Tichý himself has been interrogated many times by the secret police since 1995.

The case was definitively closed on 27 May 2009 and Mrázek's murderer wasn't found.

Mrázek's son Michal, who inherited father's wealth, publicly warned Czech politicians that he has access to a hidden archive of compromising material collected by his father.

=== Law against publishing wiretapping records ===
In February 2009, the Czech parliament amended criminal law with an explicit ban on publishing any account of police wiretapping, under penalty of a heavy fine and years of imprisonment. The law was criticised by the Czech media as an attempt by politicians to avoid future embarrassment akin to the Mrázek case.

== In popular culture ==
The Story of a Godfather (Czech: Příběh kmotra), a Czech film directed by Petr Nikolaev, is inspired by the story of František Mrázek. The movie premiered on 24 October 2013.

The character Vratislav Milota, inspired by Mrázek, appeared in the film Gangster Ka.

Mrázek appeared in television series Nineties. He was played by Albert Čuba.
