= Andrej Hryc =

Slovak actor (1949–2021)

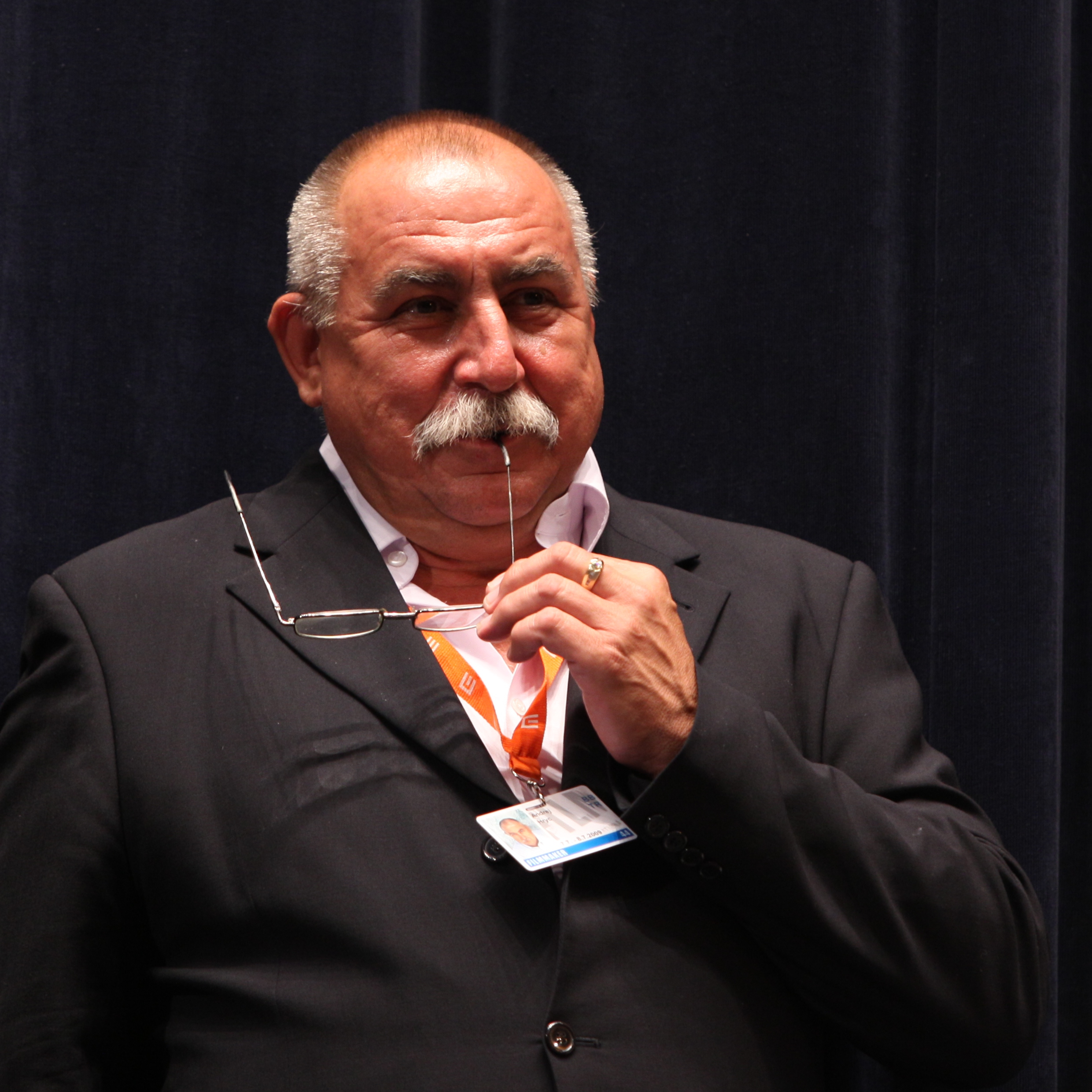
- Hryc in 2009
- Born: 30 November 1949; Bratislava, Czechoslovakia
- Died: 31 January 2021 (aged 71); Bratislava, Slovakia
- Occupation: Actor
- Years active: 1976–2021

Signature
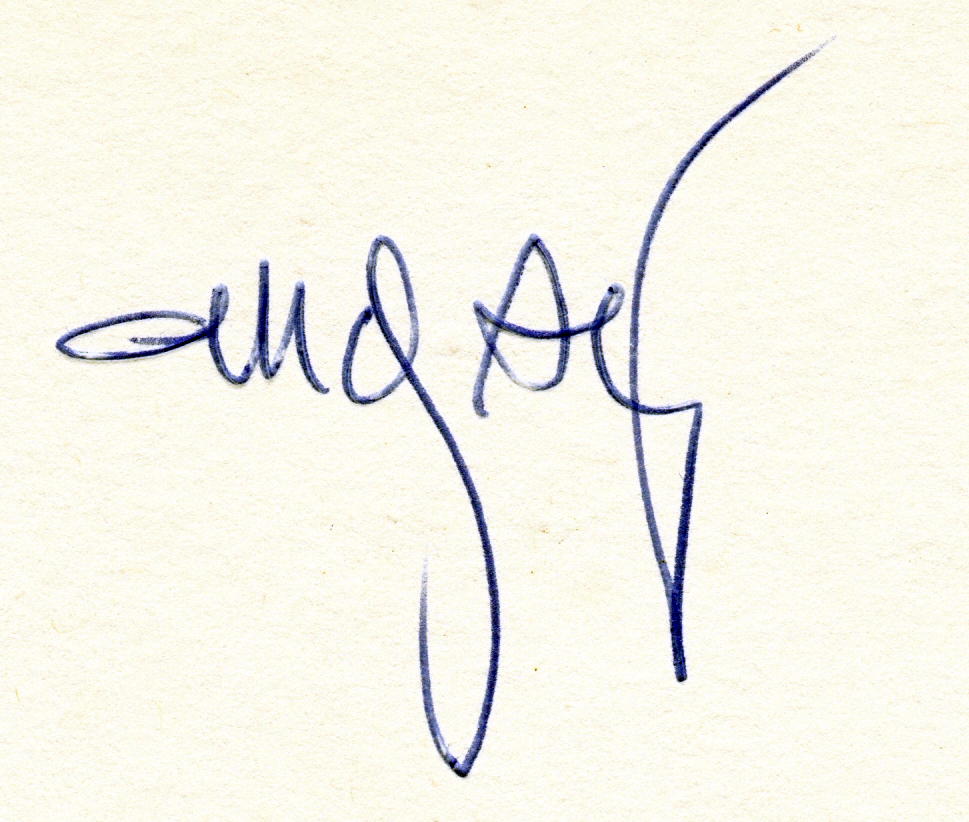

Andrej Hryc (30 November 1949 – 31 January 2021) was a Slovak actor and diplomat. He appeared in more than fifty films since 1976.

After 1989, he founded Twist, an independent radio station, running it until 2005. Hryc was Orthodox Christian.

== Selected filmography ==
Year	Title	Role	Notes
1983	Profesor Indigo video	Profesor Indego	
1998	Rivers of Babylon	Racz	
2010	Habermann	Hartel	
2013	Příběh kmotra		
2013	Colette	Fritz	
