= Příběh kmotra =

2013 Czech thriller film

Příběh Kmotra
- Directed by: Petr Nikolaev
- Written by: Petr Nikolaev; Miroslav Oščatka
- Produced by: Petr Nikolaev
- Starring: Ondřej Vetchý; Lukáš Vaculík
- Cinematography: David Ployhar
- Music by: Jakub Čech
- Distributed by: Bioscop
- Release date: 24 October 2013 (Czech Republic)
- Running time: 99 minutes
- Country: Czech Republic
- Language: Czech
- Budget: 30 million CZK
- Box office: 40 million CZK

Příběh kmotra (lit. 'Story of a Godfather') is a Czech thriller film released in 2013 based on the story of Czech Mobster František Mrázek. The film is directed by Petr Nikolaev.

The film was watched by 295,683 people in Czech cinemas, making it the second most-watched Czech film of 2013.

== Plot ==
František Vedral grows up in Communist Czechoslovakia; he has a talent for business, and loves football. Through football he befriends Standa Tipl and Josef Strnad. Strnad later becomes a high-ranking police officer while Vedral and Tipl get involved with illegal business. Vedral becomes very ruthless, and even demolishes a local Jewish cemetery to make money. He catches the attention of a young policeman, Cajthaml, who wants to arrest him. Vedral starts smuggling electronics from the West and pays with stolen goods. Cajthaml finds his warehouse, but Vedral is saved by Strnad. Vedral and his accomplices are arrested soon after, when the police find illegal materials and goods in his flat, but Vedral is released on parole. Cajthaml vows to continue pursuing him.

The fall of the communist regime gives Vedral new opportunities. His accomplices, including Tipl, are released as part of amnesty. He donates one million Czechoslovak crowns to Civic Forum and gains influence with some politicians. Thanks to voucher privatization he acquires property and his influence grows. He is watched by Cajthaml, who is waiting for an opportunity to catch Vedral and his gang. Along with his colleague Ota, he sets a trap for Vedral and prepare to arrest him, but Ota is found dead. It is classified as a suicide. Cajthaml is shocked to find out that Strnad had become a director of the National Security Authority. Vedral then ordered a murder of a troublesome journalist.

Cajthaml finds an ally in a prosecutor who is not afraid of Vedral, while Vedral plans to acquire the Sezeta company, which would make him the most powerful person in the country. Cajthaml tries to thwart his plans, but the prosecutor is found dead and Cajthaml is forced to leave the police. As revenge he plants false information among Vedral, Tipl, and Strnad, and they start to be suspicious of each other. Meanwhile, it becomes an interest of the Czech Security Agency to remove Vedral from Sezeta, and he is killed by an unknown sniper.

== Cast and characters ==
- Ondřej Vetchý as František Vedral, the ruthless protagonist and a minor criminal who becomes an influential mob boss. He has influence on politicians and entrepreneurs. Vedral is inspired by František Mrázek.
- Lukáš Vaculík as Čestmír Cajthaml, a lawful police investigator who serves as the main antagonist of the film. He tries to convict Vedral of his crimes.
- Jan Vondráček as Standa Tipl, a mobster and a crime partner of Vedral who is inspired by Tomáš Pitr.
- Vica Kerekes as Zuzana, a journalist who is Vedral's love interest and helps Cajthaml.
- Kryštof Hádek as Rotný Bohoušek, a young policeman who works with Cajthaml and supports him when he loses hope.
- Jiří Dvořák as Josef Strnad, a mobster and a friend of Vedral who works at police.
- Zuzana Čapková as Blanka Vedralova, Vedral's wife.
- Andrej Hryc as Farkaš, a sadistic gangster who works for Vedral.

== Production ==
The filming started on Saturday 25 November 2011 in Voděradské bučiny, with the first shot being a film murder. Shooting of the film took 40 days. It was finished in June 2013. The main character was due to be played by Marko Igonda, but he was eventually replaced by Ondřej Vetchý.

== Reception ==
The film was well received by critics and audiences, being rated 70% by František Fuka of FFFilm on 21 October 2013.

On 10 September 2013 the family of František Mrázek sued the filmmakers.
