= List of 2022 films based on actual events =

This is a list of films and miniseries released in 2022 that are based on actual events. All films on this list are from American production unless indicated otherwise.

== 2022 ==
- 42 Days of Darkness (Spanish: 42 días en la oscuridad) (2022) – Chilean biographical drama miniseries based on the true story of the disappearance in 2010 of Viviana Haeger and on the search for answers undertaken by her sister, Cecilia
- A Friend of the Family (2022) – biographical crime drama miniseries based on the true events of Robert Berchtold, a close friend of the Broberg family, who kidnapped Jan Broberg twice over a period of two years
- A Man of Action (Spanish: Un hombre de acción) (2022) – Spanish crime drama film based on the life of Lucio Urtubia
- A Spy Among Friends (2022) – British spy thriller miniseries following the defection of notorious British intelligence officer and KGB double agent, Kim Philby and through the lens of his complex relationship with MI6 colleague and close friend, Nicholas Elliott
- Abraham Lincoln (2022) – historical war drama miniseries chronicling the life of Abraham Lincoln, the sixteenth President of the United States
- Achena Uttam (Bengali: অচেনা উত্তম) (2022) – Indian Bengali-language biographical drama film based on the life of Uttam Kumar
- Against the Ice (2022) – Icelandic-Danish historical survival detailing the Ejnar Mikkelsen's exploration into Greenland with his compatriot Iver P. Iversen in 1910
- Ajay Wardhan (Hindi: अजय वर्धन) (2022) – Indian Hindi-language biographical drama film revolving around the life journey of a famous dental surgeon from Chandigarh, named Dr Ajay Aryan
- Amanat (Russian: Аманат) (2022) – Russian historical war film about the Russian Empire in the first half of the 19th century, after the Siege of Akhoulgo, the main conflict of the Caucasian War of 1817–1864
- American Dreamer (2022) – black comedy film based on a segment from the radio show This American Life about a professor who tries to buy the estate of a lonely widow
- American Murderer (2022) – crime drama film based on the true story of Jason Derek Brown, a charismatic con man turned party king who bankrolls his luxurious lifestyle through a series of scams
- Amsterdam (2022) – historical mystery comedy thriller film based on the Business Plot, a 1933 political conspiracy in the US
- Angelyne (2022) – biographical drama miniseries about Angelyne, an enigmatic blonde bombshell who rose to fame in the 1980s with billboard advertisements featuring her image and a journalists endeavours trying to uncover her true identity and life story
- Ann (2022) – Irish biographical drama film depicting a dramatization of Ann Lovett's last day of her life
- Anne (2022) – British historical drama miniseries revolving around the Hillsborough disaster of 1989 and its aftermath
- Aparajito (Bengali: অপরাজিতা) (2022) – Indian Bengali-language biographical drama film based on the making of the cult classic film Pather Panchali by Satyajit Ray
- Apollo 10 1/2: A Space Age Childhood (2022) – animated coming-of-age comedy drama film loosely based on the childhood of writer, director, and producer Richard Linklater
- Argentina, 1985 (2022) – Argentine-British-American historical legal drama film following the events surrounding the 1985 Trial of the Juntas, which prosecuted the ringleaders of Argentina's last civil-military dictatorship
- Arvéd (2022) – Czech mystery drama film loosely based on life of Jiří "Arvéd" Smíchovský
- Aye Zindagi (Hindi: ऐ जिंदगी) (2022) – Indian Hindi-language biographical drama film following he journey of a 26-year-old liver cirrhosis patient Vinay Chawla whose unlikely bond with a hospital grief counsellor Revathi, rekindles his hope and faith in life and makes him believe in the power of humanity, based on a true story
- Babylon (2022) – epic historical black comedy drama film chronicling the rise and fall of multiple characters during Hollywood's transition from silent films to sound films in the late 1920s
- Bali 2002 (2022) – Australian-Indonesian disaster drama miniseries revolving around the 2002 Bali bombings
- Bandit (2022) – Canadian biographical crime film based on the true life story of Gilbert Galvan Jr (also known as The Flying Bandit), who still holds a record for the most consecutive robberies in Canadian history
- The Battle at Lake Changjin II (Chinese: 長津湖之水門橋) (2022) – Chinese war drama film depicting a fictionalized retelling of the fighting at Funchilin Pass during the Battle of Chosin Reservoir against American forces in the Korean War
- Becoming Elizabeth (2022) – American-British historical drama miniseries following the younger years of Queen Elizabeth I
- Bergen (2022) – Turkish biographical drama film about singer Bergen, who has become one of the symbols of violence against women in Turkey
- Black Bird (2022) – crime drama miniseries telling the real-life story of convicted drug dealer Jimmy Keene who is forced to get a confession out of suspected serial murderer Larry Hall while in a maximum-security prison
- Blonde (2022) – biographical psychological drama film about actress, model and singer Marilyn Monroe
- The Bohemian (Italian: Il Boemo) (2022) – Italian-Czech-Slovak biographical drama film about the life and career of the Czech composer Josef Mysliveček
- Breaking (2022) – thriller drama film about the final day of the life of war veteran Lance Corporal Brian Brown-Easley
- Breaking Through (Chinese: 我心飞扬) (2022) – Chinese sports drama film about short-track speed skater Yang Yang and following the Chinese national short-track speed skating team as they attempt to prevail in winning a gold medal at the 2002 Winter Olympics in Salt Lake City, United States
- Broad Peak (2022) – Polish biographical adventure drama film centering on Maciej Berbeka, a Polish mountaineer, and his attempts to complete the first-ever winter ascent of Broad Peak, an eight-thousander in the Karakoram
- Candy (2022) – crime drama miniseries depicting the real-life Candy Montgomery, who was accused of the axe murder of her neighbor, Betty Gore in 1980, in Texas
- Chaudhry – The Martyr (Urdu: چوہدری) (2022) – Pakistani biographical action film based on the life of Chaudhry Aslam Khan
- Chevalier (2022) – biographical drama film based on the life of the titular French-Caribbean musician Chevalier de Saint-Georges
- Chiara (2022) – Italian-Belgian historical drama film following the life of Saint Clare of Assisi
- Clark (2022) – Swedish drama miniseries based on the life of Clark Olofsson and includes the events of the Norrmalmstorg robbery
- The Conference (German: Die Wannseekonferenz) (2022) – German legal drama miniseries about the Wannsee Conference in Berlin-Wannsee held on 20 January 1942, German Nazi officials meet midst the Second World War to determine the so-called “Final Solution to the Jewish Question”
- Corsage (2022) – Austrian-German-Hungarian historical drama film depicting an account of the later years of Empress Elisabeth of Austria
- Dada Lakhmi (Haryanvi: दादा लक्ष्मी) (2022) – Indian Haryanvi-language biographical drama film based on the musical journey of Haryanvi folk singer Lakhmi Chand
- Dahmer – Monster: The Jeffrey Dahmer Story (2022) – biographical crime drama miniseries following the murders of infamous serial killer Jeffrey Dahmer as told from a point of view style through the lens of his victims
- Dakuaan Da Munda 2 (Punjabi: ਡਾਕੂਆਂ ਦਾ ਮੁੰਡਾ ਦੋ) (2022) – Indian Punjabi-language biographical drama film based on the life of a drug addict – *
- Dalíland (2022) – biographical drama film about the tempestuous marriage of the painter Salvador Dalí and his wife and muse, Gala, in their later years in the 1970s
- Devil in Ohio (2022) – suspense thriller miniseries inspired by true events from a story about a fragile teenager who flees from a cult into the arms of a psychiatrist, and mother of three
- Devotion (2022) – biographical war drama film about the comradeship between naval officers Jesse Brown and Tom Hudner who become the U.S. Navy's most celebrated wingmen during the Korean War
- Dharmaveer (Marathi: धर्मवीर) (2022) – Indian Marathi-language biographical political drama film based on the story of late Shiv Sena leader Anand Dighe
- Dreamin' Wild (2022) – biographical drama film following the life and work of Donnie and Joe Emerson
- The Dropout (2022) – biographical drama miniseries chronicling Theranos founder Elizabeth Holmes' attempt to revolutionize the healthcare industry after dropping out of college and starting a technology company
- Eismayer (2022) – Austrian romantic6 drama film telling the story of two male soldiers who begin a relationship, based on real events
- Elesin Oba, The King's Horseman (2022) – Nigerian biographical drama film based on true life events of Elesin Oba, the king's chief horseman, in the 1940s Oyo State who must perform ritual suicide in light of the death of the King
- Elvis (2022) – biographical musical drama film about singer and actor Elvis Presley
- Emancipation (2022) – historical action thriller film based on the real-life story of Gordon, a former slave, and the photographs of his bare back, heavily scourged from an overseer's whippings, that were published worldwide in 1863, giving the abolitionist movement proof of the cruelty of slavery
- Emergency Situation (Czech: Mimořádná událost) (2022) – Czech comedy film based on a real event, when in February 2019, a train with passengers ran several kilometers without a driver on the Křižanov–Studenec railway line
- Emily (2022) – British biographical drama film depicting the brief life of English writer Emily Brontë
- The Fabelmans (2022) – semi-autobiographical coming-of-age drama film loosely based on Steven Spielberg's adolescence and first years as a filmmaker
- Father Stu (2022) – biographical drama film following the true-life story of Father Stuart Long
- The First Lady (2022) – anthology drama miniseries portraying the life and family events of three First Ladies of the United States: Eleanor Roosevelt, Betty Ford, and Michelle Obama
- Fisherman's Friends: One and All (2022) – British comedy drama film about the famous sea shanty singing group from Port Isaac, Cornwall
- Five Days at Memorial (2022) – disaster medical drama miniseries depicting the difficulties a New Orleans hospital endures after Hurricane Katrina makes landfall on the city
- Four Lives (2022) – British drama miniseries following the true story of the families of four young gay men who in 2014 and 2015 were murdered by Stephen Port
- Gangubai Kathiawadi (Hindi: गंगुबाई काठियावाडी) (2022) – Indian Hindi-language biographical crime drama film based on the true story of Gangubai Kothewali
- Gaslit (2022) – political thriller miniseries focusing on Martha Mitchell, a celebrity Arkansan socialite and wife to Nixon's loyal Attorney General, John N. Mitchell during the Watergate scandal
- George and Tammy (2022) – biographical drama miniseries about country music legends George Jones and Tammy Wynette, chronicling their tumultuous relationship and intertwined careers
- Gierek (2022) – Polish biographical drama film based on the life of Edward Gierek, the First Secretary of the Central Committee of the Polish United Workers' Party from 1970 to 1980
- The Girl from Plainville (2022) – biographical crime drama miniseries based on the events leading to the death of Conrad Roy and his girlfriend Michelle Carter's conviction for involuntary manslaughter
- Girl in the Shed: The Kidnapping of Abby Hernandez (2022) – crime drama television film depicting the kidnapping of 14-year-old Abby Hernandez at the hands of Nathaniel Kibby
- The Good Nurse (2022) – crime thriller film depicting the story of Charles Cullen, an American serial killer who confessed to murdering up to 40 patients during the course of his 16-year career as a nurse in New Jersey
- The Greatest Beer Run Ever (2022) – biographical war comedy drama film following the true story of John "Chickie" Donohue, who as a young veteran sneaks into the Vietnam War to deliver some beer to his friends while they serve their duty
- Har Har Mahadev (Marathi: हर हर महादेव) (2022) – Indian Marathi-language biographical drama film about Baji Prabhu Deshpande, a general of Shivaji I who, along with his army of 300 soldiers, fought against 12,000 Bijapuri soldiers
- Head Bush (Kannada: ಹೆಡ್ ಬುಷ್) (2022) – Indian Kannada-language political crime drama film about M. P. Jayaraj
- Hero (Korean: 영웅) (2022) – South Korean historical drama film following the true story of An Jung-geun, a Korean-independence activist who assassinated Itō Hirobumi, the first Prime Minister of Japan and Resident-General of Korea in 1909
- Hero of Nation Chandra Shekhar Azad (Hindi: राष्ट्र का नायक) (2022) – Indian Hindi-language biographical drama film based on Chandra Shekhar Azad's life
- Holy Spider (Persian: عنکبوت مقدس) (2022) – German-Danish crime thriller film based on the true story of Saeed Hanaei, a serial killer who targeted street prostitutes and killed 16 women from 2000 to 2001 in Mashhad, Iran
- Home Team (2022) – biographical sports comedy film about New Orleans Saints head coach Sean Payton who coached his 12-year-old son's football team during his one-year suspension from the NFL
- How We Roll (2022) – comedy miniseries inspired by the life of professional bowler Tom Smallwood
- I Love My Dad (2022) – comedy drama film based on actual events in James Morosini's life
- I'm Charlie Walker (2022) – biographical drama film depicting the true story of how one desperate man, armed with only his charm and wit, takes on a racist San Francisco corporation in 1971
- In a Land That No Longer Exists (German: In einem Land, das es nicht mehr gibt) (2022) – German historical drama film about a young woman who is thrust into the fashion scene of communist East Germany after a photograph of her ends up by chance on the cover of Sibylle magazine, loosely based on the life of model Aelrun Goette
- Infinite Storm (2022) – drama adventure film based on a true story of Pam Bales, a mountain guide who set out on a solitary trek up Mount Washington in October 2010 and the rescue of an incoherent man she encounters
- The Inspection (2022) – drama film inspired by Elegance Brattons real-life experiences and following a young man who faces homophobia, both at a Marines boot camp and at home from his mother
- Inventing Anna (2022) – crime drama miniseries inspired by the story of Anna Sorokin, a con artist and fraudster who posed as a wealthy German heiress to access the upper echelons of the New York social and art scenes from 2013 to 2017
- Jerry & Marge Go Large (2022) – comedy drama film based on Jason Fagone's 2018 HuffPost article of the same name
- Jhund (Hindi: झुंड) (2022) – Indian Hindi-language biographical film based on the life of Vijay Barse, the founder of NGO Slum Soccer
- Joe vs. Carole (2022) – drama miniseries following the criminal case of Joe Exotic, a zookeeper who has been convicted of murder-for-hire
- Jogi (Hindi: जोगी) (2022) – Indian Hindi-language historical drama film depicting events during the 1984 anti-Sikh riots
- Johnny (2022) – Polish biographical drama film based on the life of Jan Kaczkowski, a Catholic priest who ran a hospice in Puck
- Jungle Cry (Hindi: जंगल रोना) (2022) – Indian Hindi-language sports drama film following the inspiring true story of 12 underprivileged and orphan children from Kalinga Institute in Odisha, India and their triumphant journey to the International Junior Rugby Tournament held in the UK in 2007
- The Kashmir Files (2022) – Indian Hindi-language drama film centred around the 1990s exodus of Kashmiri Hindus from Indian-administered Kashmir.centred around the 1990s exodus of Kashmiri Hindus from Indian-administered Kashmir
- Khudiram Bose (Telugu: ఖుదీరామ్ బోస్) (2022) – Indian Telugu-language biographical drama film about Indian revolutionary leader Khudiram Bose
- Kikka! (2022) – Finnish biographical drama film about the Finnish singer Kikka, who died in 2005
- The King of Šumava: The Phantom of the Dark Land (Czech: Král Šumavy: Fantom temného kraje) (2022) – Czech adventure drama miniseries based on the true story of Josef Hasil, a Czech smuggler who helped people escape communist Czechoslovakia in the 1940s and 1950s
- Kingmaker (Korean: 킹메이커) (2022) – South Korean political drama film based on anecdotal accounts of the working relationship between Kim Dae-jung and his political strategist Uhm Chang-rok during his political career
- Kompromat (2022) – French war drama film loosely based on the actual kompromat case involving Yoann Barbereau
- Konda (Telugu: కొండా) (2022) – Indian Telugu-language biographical drama film exploring the political-criminal-nexus between Indian politician couple Konda Surekha, Konda Murali, Errabelli Dayakar Rao, and Maoist Ramakrishna, alias R.K.
- Lamborghini: The Man Behind the Legend (2022) – biographical drama about Italian entrepreneur Ferruccio Lamborghini
- The Last Race (Czech: Poslední závod) (2022) – Czech historical sports drama film story of Bohumil Hanč and Václav Vrbata who died during a 1913 race in Giant Mountains
- Lifemark (2022) – religious drama film adapting the true story of the adoption of David Scotton
- Litvinenko (2022) – British crime drama miniseries about the 2006 poisoning of Alexander Litvinenko in London
- Lord of the Ants (Italian: Il Signore delle Formiche) (2022) – Italian biographical drama film chronicling the 1964–1968 judicial affair involving homosexual writer Aldo Braibanti, an anti-fascist playwright who was accused of having mentally manipulated two lovers
- The Lost King (2022) – British biographical drama film depicting a dramatisation of the story of Philippa Langley, the woman who initiated the search to find King Richard III's remains under a car park in Leicester, and her treatment by the University of Leicester in the claiming of credit for the discovery
- Mahananda (Bengali: মহানন্দা) (2022) – Indian Bengali-language biographical drama film based on the life and works of the eminent writer and socio-political activist Mahasweta Devi
- Maid in Malacañang (2022) – Philippine historical drama film retelling the Marcos family's last three days in Malacañang Palace before they were forced to be exiled to Hawaii during the People Power Revolution in 1986
- Major (2022) – Indian biographical action drama film following the life of Major Sandeep Unnikrishnan, an army officer who was killed in the 2008 Mumbai attacks
- Mat Kilau (2022) – Malaysian biographical historical epic film based on Mat Kilau bin Imam Rasu, a Malay warrior who fought the British colonialists during the Pahang Uprising in Pahang, British Malaya before independence
- Medieval (2022) – Czech historical action drama film about the life of Jan Žižka, a Bohemian military commander who never lost a battle
- Mike (2022) – biographical sports drama miniseries centering on the life of boxer Mike Tyson
- Miracle at Manchester (2022) – family drama film based on a true story from 2015 about Brycen Newman's brain cancer diagnosis and recovery at Cathedral Catholic High School
- Mister Knockout (Russian: Мистер Нокаут) (2022) – Russian biographical sport drama film about the life and career of the famous Soviet boxer, 1964 Olympic champion Valeri Popenchenko
- My Son Hunter (2022) – biographical drama film about Hunter Biden, the son of US president Joe Biden and how, in 2021, Donald Trump accused Hunter Biden of corruption
- Narco-Saints (Korean: 수리남) (2022) – Korean drama miniseries depicting the true story of an ordinary entrepreneur who has no choice but to risk his life in joining the secret mission of government agents to capture a Korean drug lord operating in Suriname
- Narvik (Norwegian: Kampen om Narvik) (2022) – Norwegian historical war drama film depicting the Battles of Narvik from 9 April to 8 June 1940
- Nayika Devi: The Warrior Queen (Gujarati: નાયિકા દેવી) (2022) – Indian Gujarati-language historical drama film based on the life of Solanki Rajput Queen Naiki Devi, a warrior queen known for defeating Muhammad of Ghor
- The Night of the 12th (French: La Nuit du 12) (2022) – French-Belgian mystery thriller film depicting a fictionalised version of a real case that haunts the police officers unable to solve it
- Nineties (Czech: Devadesátky) (2022) – Czech crime drama miniseries based on real criminal cases investigated by Czech Police
- Norbourg (2022) – Canadian drama film based on the real-life Norbourg scandal of 2005
- Notre-Dame on Fire (French: Notre-Dame brûle) (2022) – French disaster film based on the Notre-Dame de Paris fire that occurred on 15 April 2019
- November (French: Novembre) (2022) – French disaster drama film depicting the investigations and the interventions of the police (in particular of the anti-terrorist sub-directorate) during the five days which followed the attacks of 13 November
- The Offer (2022) – biographical drama miniseries about the development and production of Francis Ford Coppola's landmark New York City gangster film The Godfather
- Olympics (Spanish: 42 segundos) (2022) – Spanish sports drama film depicting a dramatization of the Spain men's national water polo team's run at the 1992 Summer Olympics in Barcelona
- The One (Russian: Одна) (2022) – Russian disaster survival film based on the real events that occurred in 1981 Aeroflot Flight 811, when rescuers found a twenty-year-old student who survived after falling from a height of 5 kilometers
- Operation Mincemeat (2022) – British war drama film based upon Ben Macintyre's book on the British Operation Mincemeat during the Second World War
- Ordinary Hero (Chinese: 平凡英雄) (2022) – Chinese survival drama film based on the true story of the race to save a 7-year-old Uygur boy from Hotan, Xinjiang, whose arm was severed in a freak accident
- Oussekine (2022) – French drama miniseries based on the events of 5 December 1986 which led to the assassination of Malik Oussekine, a young 22-year-old student, by police
- Padre Pio (2022) – Italian-German biographical drama film following Roman Catholic Saint Padre Pio in his early years
- Pam & Tommy (2022) – biographical drama miniseries chronicling the marriage between actress Pamela Anderson and Mötley Crüe drummer Tommy Lee
- Pawankhind (Marathi: पावनखिंड) (2022) – Indian Marathi-language historical action film based on the life of Maratha warrior, Baji Prabhu Deshpande
- Peter I: The Last Tsar and the First Emperor (Russian: Пётр I: Последний царь и первый император) (2022) – Russian historical drama film about events in Russia in the 17th and 18th centuries, telling about the transformation of Ancient Rus' into the Russian Empire and the construction of a state that became the foundation for modern Russia
- Pinball: The Man Who Saved the Game (2022) – biographical comedy drama film based on true events around the story of Roger Sharpe, GQ journalist and real-life "pinball wizard" who in 1976 helped overturn New York City's 35-year ban on pinball
- Pistol (2022) – biographical drama miniseries that follows Sex Pistols guitarist Steve Jones and the band's rise to prominence and notoriety
- The Playlist (2022) – drama miniseries based on the story of the birth of the Swedish music streaming company, Spotify along with its early challenges
- Ponniyin Selvan: I (Tamil: பொன்னியின் செல்வன்) (2022) – Indian Tamil-language epic historical drama film revolving around the early life of Chola Prince Arulmozhi Varman who was later known as the great Chola emperor Raja Raja Chola
- Prizefighter: The Life of Jem Belcher (2022) – British-American biographical drama film exploring the life of Jem Belcher who became the youngest ever world champion in boxing
- Rabiye Kurnaz vs. George W. Bush (German: Rabiye Kurnaz gegen George W. Bush) (2022) – German biographical film based on the true story of Murat Kurnaz, a young German of Turkish descent, who was unlawfully detained in Guantanamo Bay in 2001, and his mother's legal battle for his release
- Rescued by Ruby (2022) – biographical drama film following a state trooper named Dan, who dreams of joining the K-9 search and rescue team of the state police, however has been unsuccessful in doing so until he befriends a shelter dog named Ruby
- Rhinegold (German: Rheingold) (2022) – German biographical gangster drama film based on the life of Iranian-Kurdish hip-hop rapper, entrepreneur, and ex-convict Giwar Hajabi
- Rise (2022) – biographical sports drama film based on the true story of three young Nigerian-Greek brothers, Giannis, Thanasis and Kostas Antetokounmpo, who emigrate to the United States and rise to fame and success within the National Basketball Association
- Rocketry: The Nambi Effect (2022) – Indian biographical drama film based on the life of Nambi Narayanan, a former scientist and aerospace engineer of the Indian Space Research Organisation who was falsely accused of espionage
- Rogue Agent (2022) – British thriller film based on the article "Chasing Agent Freegard" by Michael Bronner
- RRR (2022) – Indian Telugu-language epic historical action drama film about two Indian revolutionaries, Alluri Sitarama Raju and Komaram Bheem, and their fight against the British Raj
- Salaam Venky (Hindi: सलाम वेंकी) (2022) – Indian Hindi-language drama film centered around the true story of a mother who does everything she can to let her son, diagnosed with Duchenne muscular dystrophy, live life to the fullest
- Samrat Prithviraj (Hindi: सम्राट पृथ्वीराज) (2022) – Indian Hindi-language historical action drama film based on the life of Prithviraj Chauhan, a Rajput king from the Chahamana dynasty
- SAS: Rogue Heroes (2022) – British historical drama miniseries depicting the formation of the Special Air Service during World War II
- Save the Cinema (2022) – British comedy drama film based on the true story of Liz Evans on her quest to save her local theater
- Shabaash Mithu (Hindi: शाबाश मिठू) (2022) – Indian Hindi-language biographical sports drama film based on the life of former Test and ODI captain of the India women's national cricket team, Mithali Raj
- She Said (2022) – drama film depicting the work done by journalists Jodi Kantor and Megan Twohey to break the story of Harvey Weinstein's sexual misconduct allegations
- The Silent Twins (2022) – internationally co-produced biographical drama film about the twin sisters, June and Jennifer Gibbons, who were institutionalized at Broadmoor Hospital following years of silence and teenage rebellion
- Silverton Siege (2022) – South African crime film based on the real life siege that took place in Silverton, Pretoria in 1980
- Simone Veil, A Woman of the Century (2022) – French biographical drama film which explores the life of [Simone Veil] – the famous French figure who survived the Holocaust and went on to become a leading politician, human rights campaigner, and feminist – through a series of non-chronological memories
- The Sitting Duck (French: La Syndicaliste) (2022) – French-German thriller film about Maureen Kearney, an Irish trade unionist for the nuclear power company Areva
- The Situation of Mehdi (Persian: موقعیت مهدی) (2022) – Iranian biographical war drama film about Mehdi Bakeri, an Iranian war hero in the Iran-Iraq war
- Spoiler Alert (2022) – romantic comedy drama film about Michael Ausiello's marriage to Kit Cowan, who died of terminal cancer in 2015
- Srimulat: Hil yang Mustahal (2022) – Indonesian biographical comedy film about Indonesian legendary comedy troupe Srimulat
- The Staircase (2022) – true crime miniseries depicting Michael Peterson, a writer convicted of murdering his wife Kathleen Peterson, who was found dead at the bottom of the staircase in their home
- The Stranger (2022) – Australian crime thriller film about two strangers who meet and strike up a friendship, while one of them is a veteran undercover police officer working to secure a conviction for an unsolved murder committed years earlier
- Studio 666 (2022) – comedy horror film based on a story from Dave Grohl inspired by the Foo Fighters experiences recording their tenth album
- Super Pumped: The Battle for Uber (2022) – biographical drama film dramatizing the foundation of the ride-hailing company Uber from the perspective of the company's CEO Travis Kalanick, who is ultimately ousted in a boardroom coup
- The Swimmers (2022) – survival sports drama film telling the story of teenage Olympian refugee, Yusra Mardini, who dragged a dinghy of refugees to safety across the Aegean Sea
- Tchaikovsky's Wife (Russian: Жена Чайковского) (2022) – Russian biographical drama film about the wife of the composer Pyotr Ilyich Tchaikovsky
- Thai Cave Rescue (Thai: ถ้ำหลวง: ภารกิจแห่งความหวัง) (2022) – Thai survival miniseries based on the events of the Tham Luang cave rescue that occurred in Tham Luang-Khun Nam Nang Non National Park during June and July 2018, in which twelve members of the Wild Boars youth football team and their assistant coach were rescued from the flooded Tham Luang Nang Non cave system
- Then Barbara Met Alan (2022) – British drama television film telling the story of two cabaret performers, comedian Barbara and activist-performer Alan who help find DAN, the Disabled People's Direct Action Network and lead protests for disabled people's rights which eventually lead to the Disability Discrimination Act 1995
- Theodore Roosevelt (2022) – historical drama miniseries chronicling the life of Theodore Roosevelt, the twenty-sixth President of the United States
- The Thief, His Wife and the Canoe (2022) – British drama miniseries dramatizing the John Darwin disappearance case, where prison officer and teacher John Darwin hoaxed his own death and reappeared, five and a half years after he was believed to have died in a canoeing accident
- The Thing About Pam (2022) – crime drama miniseries detailing the involvement of Pam Hupp in the 2011 murder of Betsy Faria
- Thirteen Lives (2022) – biographical survival drama film about the events of the 2018 Tham Luang cave rescue that saw a junior football team and their coach trapped in a cave for a period of 18 days
- This England (2022) – British disaster drama miniseries depicting the first wave of the COVID-19 pandemic in the United Kingdom based on testimonies of people in the Boris Johnson administration, on the various intergovernmental advisory groups (including the Scientific Advisory Group for Emergencies), and in other affected British institutions such as care homes and hospitals
- This Is Going to Hurt (2022) – British medical comedy drama miniseries based on a collection of diary entries written by Adam Kay during his medical training from 2004 to 2010
- Till (2022) – biographical drama film based on the real-life story of Mamie Till-Mobley (Deadwyler), an American educator and activist who pursues justice after the 1955 lynching of her 14-year-old son Emmett Till
- Under the Banner of Heaven (2022) – crime drama miniseries about the case of brothers Ron and Dan Lafferty who killed their sister-in-law and her young daughter in 1984
- Underbelly: Vanishing Act (2022) – drama miniseries based on the story of high-roller Melissa Caddick who was alleged to have embezzled $40 million before vanishing in November 2020 the day after the Australian Securities & Investments Commission executed a search warrant on her Dover Heights, Sydney home
- Vardy v Rooney: A Courtroom Drama (2022) – British courtroom drama miniseries based on the Wagatha Christie events and subsequent high-profile court case
- Vijayanand (Kannada: ವಿಜಯಾನಂದ್) (2022) – Indian Kannada-language biographical drama film based on the life of Indian businessman, Vijay Sankeshwar
- The Watcher (2022) – crime drama miniseries following the true story of a married couple who, after moving into their dream home in New Jersey, are harassed through letters signed by a stalker named "The Watcher"
- The Walk-In (2022) – British true crime miniseries based on the true story of how Matthew F. Collins of activist group Hope not Hate infiltrated British neo-Nazi terrorist group National Action, foiling a plot to assassinate Labour MP Rosie Cooper
- War Sailor (Norwegian: Krigsseileren) (2022) – Norwegian war drama film based on the true stories of the 30,000 Norwegian civilian sailors who participated in the Allied convoys during the Second World War
- We Are Next of Kin (German: Wir sind dann wohl die Angehörigen) (2022) – German psychological drama film about the kidnapping of Jan Philipp Reemtsma, but from the point of view of his son Johann, then 13 years old
- We Own This City (2022) – crime drama miniseries depicting the rise and fall of the Baltimore Police Department's Gun Trace Task Force and the corruption surrounding it
- WeCrashed (2022) – drama miniseries about Adam and Rebekah Neumann, the real-life married couple at the heart of WeWork, a coworking space company whose valuation reached $47 billion in 2019 before crashing as a result of financial revelations
- Weird: The Al Yankovic Story (2022) – biographical parody film loosely based on Yankovic's life and career as an accordionist and parody songwriter
- Welcome to Chippendales (2022) – drama miniseries telling the life story of Somen 'Steve' Banerjee, the co-founder of Chippendales, later convicted of arson, racketeering, and murder
- Whina (2022) – New Zealand biographical film about the life of Dame Whina Cooper
- Whitney Houston: I Wanna Dance with Somebody (2022) – biographical musical drama film about singer and actress Whitney Houston
- Who is Pravin Tambe? (Hindi: कौन प्रवीण तांबे) (2022) – Indian Hindi-language biographical sports drama film based on the life of Indian cricketer Pravin Tambe
- Wings Over Berlin (Russian: Крылья над Берлином) (2022) – Russian war drama film about the heroic deed of the pilots of the 1st Mine-Torpedo Aviation Regiment of the Baltic Fleet Air Force, headed by Colonel Preobrazhensky, who were tasked with striking Berlin
- The Woman King (2022) – historical epic film about the Agojie, the all-female warrior unit who protected the African kingdom of Dahomey in the 19th century
- Women of the Movement (2022) – historical drama miniseries based on Mamie Till-Mobley who devoted her life to seeking justice for her murdered son Emmett
