= 2022 Czech Lion Awards =

Czech film and TV award ceremony

30th Czech Lion Awards
- Date: 4 March 2023
- Hosted by: Jiří Havelka

Highlights
- Best Picture: Il Boemo
- Best Actor: Michal Kern; Arvéd
- Best Actress: Klára Melíšková; Suspicion
- Best Supporting Actor: Marsell Bendig; Banger
- Best Supporting Actress: Martha Issová; Buko
- Most awards: Il Boemo (6)
- Most nominations: Arvéd (12)

Television coverage
- Network: Česká televize

2022 Czech Lion Awards ceremony was held on 4 March 2023.

== Categories ==
Nominations were announced on 16 January 2023 with Arvéd receiving 12 nominations while Il Boemo received 11 nominations and Banger 8 nominations. Il Boemo has won 6 awards including Best film award. The ceremony was notable for success of television projects in other categories than Best Television Film or Miniseries and Best TV Series.

Best Film	Best Director
Il Boemo; Arvéd; Banger; Victim; Nightsiren	Il Boemo – Petr Václav; Arvéd – Vojtěch Mašek; Banger – Adam Sedlák; Victim – Michal Blaško; Nightsiren – Tereza Nvotová
Best Actor in a Leading Role	Best Actress in a Leading Role
Arvéd – Michal Kern; Banger – Adam Mišík; Borders of Love – Matyáš Řezníček; Il Boemo – Vojtěch Dyk; The Word – Martin Finger	Suspicion – Klára Melíšková; And Then There Was Love... – Pavla Tomicová; Il Boemo – Barbara Ronchi; Victim – Vita Smalchelyuk; The Nightsiren – Natália Germáni
Best Actor in a Supporting Role	Best Actress in a Supporting Role
Banger – Marsell Bendig; Arvéd – Saša Rašilov; Grand Prix – Štěpán Kozub; Somewhere Over the Chemtrails – Miroslav Krobot; The Last Race – Oldřich Kaiser	Buko – Martha Issová; Grand Prix – Tatiana Dyková; Grand Prix – Anna Kameníková; Il Boemo – Lana Vlady; Suspicion – Denisa Barešová
Best Screenplay	Best Editing
Arvéd – Jan Poláček, Vojtěch Mašek; Banger – Adam Sedlák; Il Boemo – Petr Václav; Victim – Jakub Medvecký; Suspicion – Štěpán Hulík	Banger – Šimon Hájek, Jakub Jelínek; Arvéd – Hedvika Hansalová; Good Old Czechs – Šimon Špidla; Kapr Code – Adam Brothánek; The Nightsiren – Pavel Hrdlička, Tribault Hague
Best Cinematography	Stage Design
The Last Race – Jan Baset Střítežský; Arvéd – Dušan Husár; Banger – Dušan Husár; Il Boemo – Diego Romero Suarez-Llanos; The Nightsiren – Frederico Cesca	Il Boemo – Irena Hradecká, Luca Servino; Arvéd – Nina Feriancová; Ordinary Failures – Antonín Šilar; Nineties – Henrich Boráros; Medieval – Jiří Sternwald
Makeup and Hairstyling	Costume Design
Il Boemo – Andrea McDonald; Arvéd – Iveta Huptychová; Grand Prix – Lukáš Král, Jana Bílková; Medieval – Ivo Strangmüller, René Stejskal, Jamie Keiman; Maria Theresia – episode 5 – Ivo Strangmüller, René Stejskal, David Šesták	Il Boemo – Andrea Cavalletto; Arvéd – Františka Králíková; Nineties – Andrea Králová; Medieval – Kateřina Mírová; Maria Theresia – episode 5 – Ján Kocman
Music	Sound
Arvéd – Ondřej Mikula, Jonatán Pastirčák; Banger – Oliver Torr; The King of Šumava: The Phantom of the Dark Land – Beata Hlavenková; The Word – Jan P. Muchow; The Nightsiren – Jonatán Pastirčák, Robin Coudert	Il Boemo – Daniel Němec, Francesco Liotard; Arvéd – Jakub Jurásek; Medieval – Martin Jílek, Peter Hilčanský, Viktor Prášil; Kapr Code – Richard Müller; The Nightsiren – Marek Hart, Michaela Patríková, Ivan Horák
Extraordinary audiovisual achievement	Best Documentary
Eduard Kučera, Milada Kučerová, Petr Šikoč, Alice Šikočová, Pavel Sláma and Petra Slámová	Art Talent Show; Brotherhood; Good Old Czechs; Kapr Code; Toyen, The Baroness of Surrealism
Best Animated Film	Best Short Film
Suzie in the Garden; Carp Xmass; Darkening	Rituály; Barcarole; Vinland
Best Television Film or Miniseries	Best TV Series
Suspicion; The King of Šumava: The Phantom of the Dark Land; Shadows in the Mist	Nineties; Five Years; Shadows in the Mist
Unique Contribution to Czech Film
Marcela Pittermannová

=== Non-statutory Awards ===
Best Film Poster	Film Fans Award
Arvéd; Borders of Love; Kapr Code; The Last Race; The Nightsiren	Nineties
Magnesie Award for Best Student Film
Vinland; Asterión; Atestace; Ostrov svobody; Rituály
