= Mira Fornay =

Slovak film director (born 1977)

- Born: 8 May 1977 (age 49); Bratislava, Czechoslovakia
- Occupations: Director, Screenwriter
- Years active: 1998-present

Mira Fornay, also known as Mira Fornayová (born 8 May 1977) is a Slovak film director and screenwriter. Her film, My Dog Killer, won the main award at the 2013 International Film Festival Rotterdam. My Dog Killer won three awards at the 2014 Sun in a Net Awards including Best Film, Best Director and Best Screenplay.

== Selected filmography ==
=== Director ===
- Ex-pozice (2001)
- Líštičky (2009)
- My Dog Killer (2013)
- Cook F**K Kill (2019)
