= Konda (film) =

- Theatrical release poster
- Directed by: Ram Gopal Varma
- Screenplay by: Ram Gopal Varma
- Story by: Ram Gopal Varma
- Produced by: Konda Sushmitha Patel
- Starring: Thrigun; Irra Mor; Tulasi; L. B. Sriram; Prudhvi Raj
- Cinematography: V. Malhar Bhatt Joshi
- Edited by: Manish Thakur
- Music by: D.S.R
- Production company: Shresta Patel Movies
- Distributed by: A Company Production; Apple Tree
- Release date: 23 June 2022
- Running time: 121 minutes
- Country: India
- Language: Telugu

Konda (transl. The hill) is a 2022 Indian Telugu-language political crime thriller film written and directed by Ram Gopal Varma, and produced by Sushmitha Patel. The film explores the political-criminal-nexus between Indian politician couple Konda Surekha, Konda Murali, Errabelli Dayakar Rao, and Maoist Ramakrishna, alias R.K. Konda was released on 23 June 2022 to mixed reviews.

== Plot ==
Konda Murali is a student at Lal Bahadur College, Warangal, Telangana. Murali is fascinated by RK alias Ramakrishna, who is already playing an influential role in the Naxalite movement. Murali falls in love with Surekha who studies in the same college at first sight. In the meantime, Konda Murali confronts Nalla Sudhakar, a politician who is conspiring against him politically, and assassinate him.

== Cast ==
- Thrigun as Konda Murali
- Irra Mor as Konda Surekha, wife of Konda Murali
- Tulasi as Konda Chennamma, Mother of Konda Murali
- L. B. Sriram as Konda Komuraiah, Father of Konda Murali
- Prashant Karthi as Maoist Leader, Ramakrishna, alias R.K.
- Parvathi M Arun as Bharatakka wife of R.K.
- Prudhvi Raj as Nalla Balli Sudhakar Rao, based on Errabelli Dayakar Rao
- Jabardast Ramprasad as Kolli Pratap Reddy
- Giridhar Chandramouli as Ramulu
- Dharani as Gundu
- Vinay Prakash as Y. S. R.
- Lingampalli Anil Kumar Reddy as Sub Inspector Brahmam
- Kedar Shankar as Konda Surekha Father
- Abhilash Chaudhary as Riyaz
- Sravan as Shravan

== Production ==
The film was officially launched in October 2021 in Vanchanagiri, Warangal.

== Reception ==
Citing it as "unintentionally hilarious film", Sangeetha Devi Dundoo of The Hindu wrote that "How much of Konda is real is a debate for another time. As a film, it takes a lot of patience to sit through it". The Times of India gave a rating of 2.5 out of 5 and felt that Konda is "a typical RGV offering". The critic further stated: "the director used the street theatre-style screenplay for narrating and delivering message-oriented scenes, a sort-after medium used by yesteryear revolutionaries to awaken the masses". NTV's Naresh Kota praised the performance of Adith Arun (aka Trigun), while criticizing the writing, direction and music composition of the film.
