= Jana Pidrmanová =

Czech theatre and film actor (born 1985)

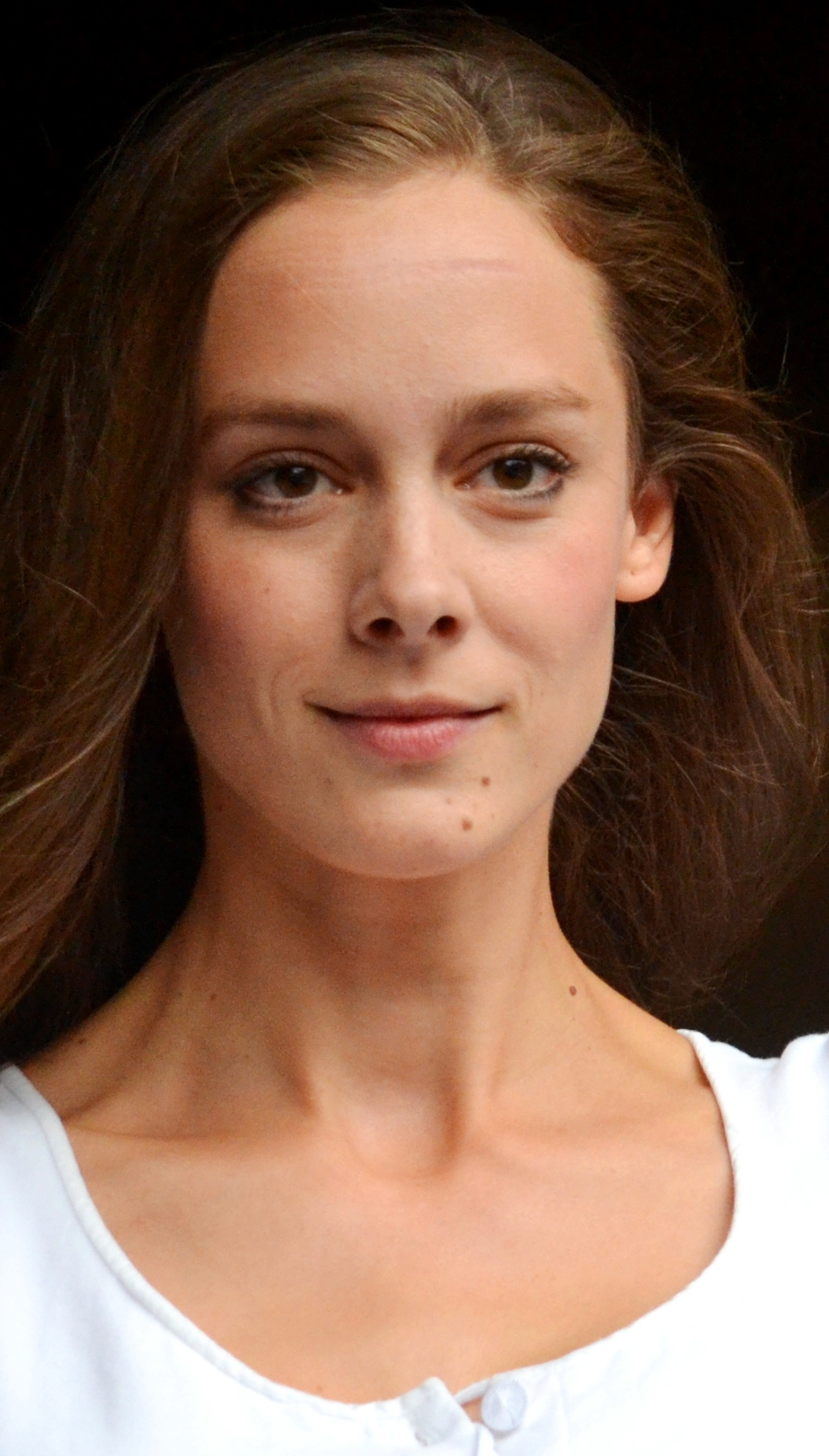
- Jana Pidrmanová
- Born: 17 March 1985 (age 41); Cheb, Czechoslovakia (now Czech Republic)
- Occupation: Theatre actress
- Years active: 2009–present

Jana Pidrmanová (born 17 March 1985, Cheb) is a Czech theatre and film actor.

== Biography ==
She has spent her childhood in Františkovy Lázně and graduated from a hotel high school. After graduation she studied at Theatre Faculty of the Academy of Performing Arts (DAMU) (from 2004 to 2008), her teachers were e.g. Eva Salzmannová, Alois Švehlík, Jan Nebeský and Daria Ullrichová. She also studied special education at the University of Hradec Králové. After graduating from DAMU, she first performed at the South Bohemian Theater (Jihočeské divadlo, České Budějovice) and since 2009 she has been performing at the National Theater in Prague.

== Selected theatre roles ==
- 2008 Hadar Galron: Mikve, Tehíla, Stavovské divadlo, dir. Michal Dočekal
- 2010 David Harrower: Blackbird, Una, Divadlo Kolovrat, dir. Jiří Pokorný
- 2011 William Shakespeare: Zkrocení zlé ženy, Bianco, Vdova, Národní divadlo, dir. Martin Čičvák
- 2011 William Shakespeare: Král Lear, Regan, Národní divadlo, dir. Jan Nebeský
- 2012 Molière: Pán z Prasečkova, Julie, Stavovské divadlo, dir. Hana Burešová
- 2013 F. F. Šamberk: Jedenácté přikázání, Julie, Stavovské divadlo, dir. David Drábek
- 2014 Josef Čapek, Karel Čapek: Ze života hmyzu, Inženýr moderátorka, Jeho larvička, Mravenec, Národní divadlo, dir. Daniel Špinar
- 2014 William Shakespeare: Othello, benátský mouřenín, Bianco, Stavovské divadlo, dir. Daniel Špinar
- 2015 Mike Bartlett: Zemětřesení v Londýně, Freya, Nová scéna, dir. Daniel Špinar
- 2015 Ondřej Havelka, Martin Vačkář: V rytmu swingu buší srdce mé, Zdenka, a mnohé jiné, Národní divadlo, dir. Ondřej Havelka
- 2015 Maurice Maeterlinck: Modrý pták, Světlo, Noc, Dcerka, Stavovské divadlo, dir. Štěpán Pácl
- 2016 Vítězslav Nezval: Manon Lescaut, Manon, Národní divadlo, dir. Daniel Špinar
- 2016 A. P. Čechov: Tři sestry, Máša, Stavovské divadlo, dir. Daniel Špinar

== Selected film roles ==
Year	Title	Role	Director	Notes
2007	V hlavní roli film	Sabrina	Petr Slavík	
2009	2Bobule (2Grapes)	Marie	Vlad Lanné	
2010	Bludičky	Marie	Irena Pavlásková	
2010	Okresní přebor, part 6. – Lucka	Lucka Luňáková	Jan Prušinovský	
2010	Poste Restante	Lída Rantlová, zahradnice	Karel Smyczek	
2012	O pokladech	Barborka	Vít Karas	
2013	Cirkus Bukowsky	Pokorná	Jan Pachl	
2013	Škoda lásky, part 8. – Diamantová svatba	Lenka Černá, redaktorka	Vít Karas	
2014	Kriminálka Anděl IV.	npor. Lída Rysová	Jiří Chlumský, Jaroslav Fuit	
2014	Poslední z Aporveru (The Last Children of Aporver)	Maysu	Tomáš Krejčí	not yet completed
2016	Mordparta	Vendy	Róbert Šveda, Peter Bebjak	
2018	Zbraslavské pašije	smrtka (Death)	Oldřich Vlček	
2018	Balada o pilotovi	Olina Mossová	Ján Sebechlebský	
2018	Alenka v zemi zázraků	mother	Jana Studničková, Otakáro Maria Schmidt	
2019	Za oponou	Adéla	Dan Pánek	
