= Murder in Polná =

2016 Czech television film

- Written by: Václav Šašek
- Directed by: Viktor Polesný
- Starring: Jaroslav Plesl, Karel Heřmánek, Karel Roden
- Country of origin: Czech Republic
- Original language: Czech

Production
- Running time: 172 minutes
- Production company: Czech Television

Original release
- Release: 2016

Murder in Polná (Czech: Zločin v Polné) is a 2016 Czech film that deals with Hilsner Affair. Hilsner's lawyer Zdeno Auředníček is the protagonist of the film.

== Plot ==
The film starts with murder of Anežka Hrůzová. She was found between the village of Veznicka and the town of Polná. People conclude that Jews must have been involved with the murder as there was no sexual violence and everyone believes that murder had religious motif. Young Jewish rover Leopold Hillsner comes up as potential murderer.

== Cast ==
- Jaroslav Plesl as Zdeno Auředníček
- Karel Heřmánek jr. as Leopold Hilsner
- Karel Roden as Tomáš Garrigue Masaryk
- Gabriela Míčová as Anna Auředníčková
- František Němec as Reichl
