= Museo Ferruccio Lamborghini =

Coordinates: 44.6079°N 11.3683°E

- Established: 1995; 31 years ago 2014; 12 years ago
- Location: Via Galliera, 319; Funo di Argelato (BO); Italy
- Type: Automobile museum
- Website: Museo Ferruccio Lamborghini

Museo Ferruccio Lamborghini is an Italian museum in Argelato, a few kilometres from the centre of Bologna, Emilia-Romagna, focused on the life and work of Ferruccio Lamborghini, the founder of the Lamborghini sports car marque.

It has recently been relocated from its first Ferrarese site (Dosso di S. Agostino) to a new site located in a former Lamborghini factory in Argelato.

In 1995, the first Ferruccio Lamborghini Museum was inaugurated next to the Lamborghini Calor plant, nestled in the Ferrara countryside birthplace of Ferruccio Lamborghini. After 19 years and thousands of visitors from all over the world, his son, Antonio (Tonino) Lamborghini, with the entrepreneurial spirit and avant-garde character that distinguishes his every project, decided to bring the Museum closer to the city of Bologna and to give more emphasis to the history of his father, the genius of mechanics and Cavaliere del Lavoro, dedicating him a new exhibition space.

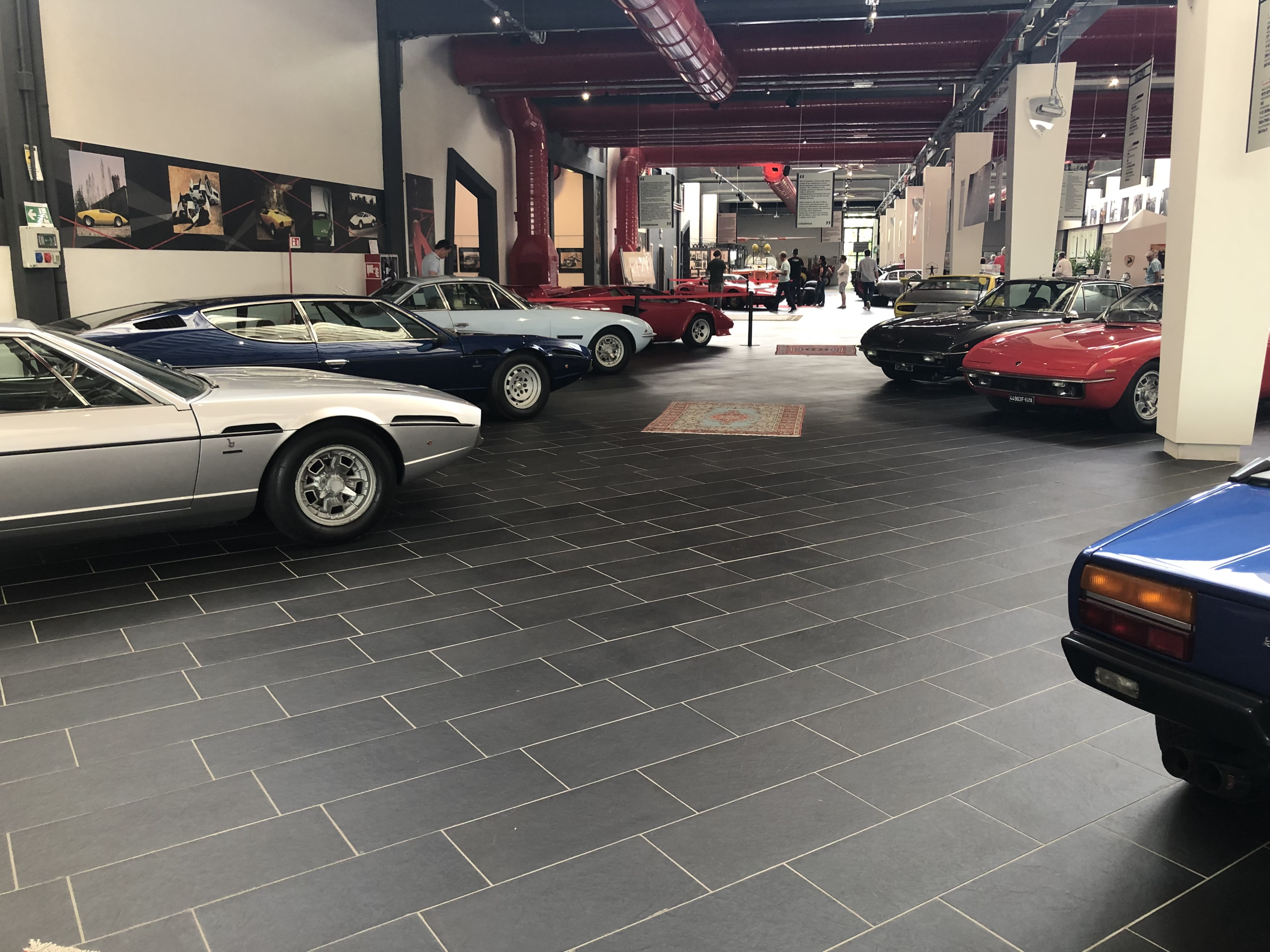
Museo Ferruccio Lamborghini

It collects all the industrial productions of the Doctor of Engineering (Hon. Causa) Lamborghini, from the first Carioca tractor which started his company in 1947 to the sports cars of the 1950s, 1960s, and 1970s. Ferruccio Lamborghini's personal collection in the museum includes the Miura SV, the Fiat Barchetta Sport, modified to participate in the 1948 Mille Miglia competition, the Countach, the Jarama models, the Urraco and the Espada.

== See also ==
- Museo Lamborghini
