= Cook F**K Kill =

- Czech: Žáby bez jazyka
- Slovak: Žaby bez jazyka
- Directed by: Mira Fornay
- Written by: Mira Fornay
- Produced by: Mira Fornay; Viktor Schwarcz
- Starring: Jaroslav Plesl; Petra Fornayová; Regina Rázlová; Bohuslav Zárychta; Jan Alexander; Jazmína Cigánková; Irena Bendová; Roman Lipka
- Cinematography: Tomás Sysel
- Edited by: Mira Fornay
- Production company: Cineart TV Prague
- Release dates: 23 November 2019 (Tallinn Black Nights Film Festival); 15 October 2020 (Czech Republic)
- Running time: 116 minutes
- Countries: Czech Republic; Slovakia
- Language: Czech

Cook F**K Kill (Czech title: Žáby bez jazyka, Slovak title: Žaby bez jazyka) is a 2019 Czech-Slovak comedy-drama film directed by Mira Fornay, starring Jaroslav Plesl, Petra Fornayová, Regina Rázlová, Bohuslav Zárychta, Jan Alexander, Jazmína Cigánková, Irena Bendová and Roman Lipka.

== Plot ==
Brandon, a reserved and emotionally withdrawn man, discovers shortly before his wedding anniversary that his wife may be unfaithful. He had planned a surprise trip to Thailand for the occasion, but instead of confronting her, he invites his estranged childhood friend Dan to join him on the journey. During their travels through Thailand, the two reconnect while exploring various locations and meeting other travelers and locals. Dan encourages Brandon to confront his personal situation and reconsider his future, while Brandon remains preoccupied with his failing marriage and struggles to engage with his surroundings. As the trip progresses, their friendship is tested and gradually renewed. Encounters with other characters and shared experiences prompt Brandon to reflect on his life, relationships, and sense of purpose, leading him to reconsider his priorities and the direction he wishes to take.

== Cast ==
- Jaroslav Plesl as Jaroslav K
- Petra Fornayová as Jaroslav K zena
- Regina Rázlová as Dorota
- Bohuslav Zárychta as Gustáv
- Jan Alexander as Kamil
- Jazmína Cigánková as Blanka
- Irena Bendová as Janka
- Roman Lipka as Petr
- Mária Surková as Starenka

== Release ==
The film premiered at the Tallinn Black Nights Film Festival on 23 November 2019.

== Reception ==
Demetrios Matheou of Screen Daily called the film a "boldly-executed absurdist comedy, which tackles its central theme – domestic abuse – in a manner very different to the usual gritty realist approaches, with provocative, sometimes discomforting results."

Martin Kudlac of ScreenAnarchy wrote that the film is an "original and fearless vision and formalistically idiosyncratic work, unsettling without being didactic, topical and timeless while addressing a pathology inherited within the society, eerie fatalism infused by dark humor."

Alissa Simon of Variety wrote that while the film is a "tad too long and definitely not for everyone", it is "without doubt Fornay's most ambitious and stimulating work."
