= My Dog Killer =

2013 film

- Film poster
- Directed by: Mira Fornay
- Written by: Mira Fornay
- Produced by: Juraj Buzalka; Mira Fornay; Viktor Schwarcz
- Starring: Adam Mihál
- Cinematography: Tomás Sysel
- Edited by: Hedvika Hansalová
- Production companies: Mirafox; Cineart Production
- Release date: 29 January 2013 (IFF Rotterdam)
- Running time: 90 minutes
- Countries: Slovakia; Czech Republic
- Languages: Slovak; Czech

My Dog Killer (Slovak: Môj pes Killer) is a 2013 Slovak-Czech drama film written and directed by Mira Fornay. The film was selected as the Slovak entry for the Best Foreign Language Film at the 86th Academy Awards, but was not nominated.

== Cast ==
- Adam Mihál
- Marián Kuruc
- Irena Bendová
- Libor Filo

== See also ==
- List of submissions to the 86th Academy Awards for Best Foreign Language Film
- List of Slovak submissions for the Academy Award for Best Foreign Language Film
