= Murciélago =

Legendary fighting bull

Murciélago (Spanish for "bat") was a Navarra fighting bull who gained fame after Lamborghini chose to name a supercar after him to continue the passion for bullfighting that Ferruccio Lamborghini, the company's founder, was famous for.

Murciélago was a 5-year dark-brown Retinta breed bull with partridge eye coat and middle-length horns. He survived 24 jabs in a 5 October 1879 fight against Rafael "El Lagartijo" Molina Sánchez, at the Coso de los califas bullring in Córdoba, Spain. Murciélago demonstrated his indomitable bravery during the bullfight that the crowd asked the matador to spare the bull. The bull, which came from the farm of Joaquín del Val de Navarra, was later presented as a gift to Don Antonio Miura. Together with his brother, Don Eduardo Miura, they brought Murciélago into the Miura line by siring him with 70 cows. Bulls from the Miura ranch, located near Seville, Spain, are known for being large and ferocious.

== Lamborghini ==
The name of Murciélago was used by Lamborghini to name the Lamborghini Murciélago model manufactured between 2001 and 2010, reflecting Ferruccio Lamborghini's passion for bullfighting. The manufacturer has named its cars for several different famous bulls throughout its history.
