= Town Life =

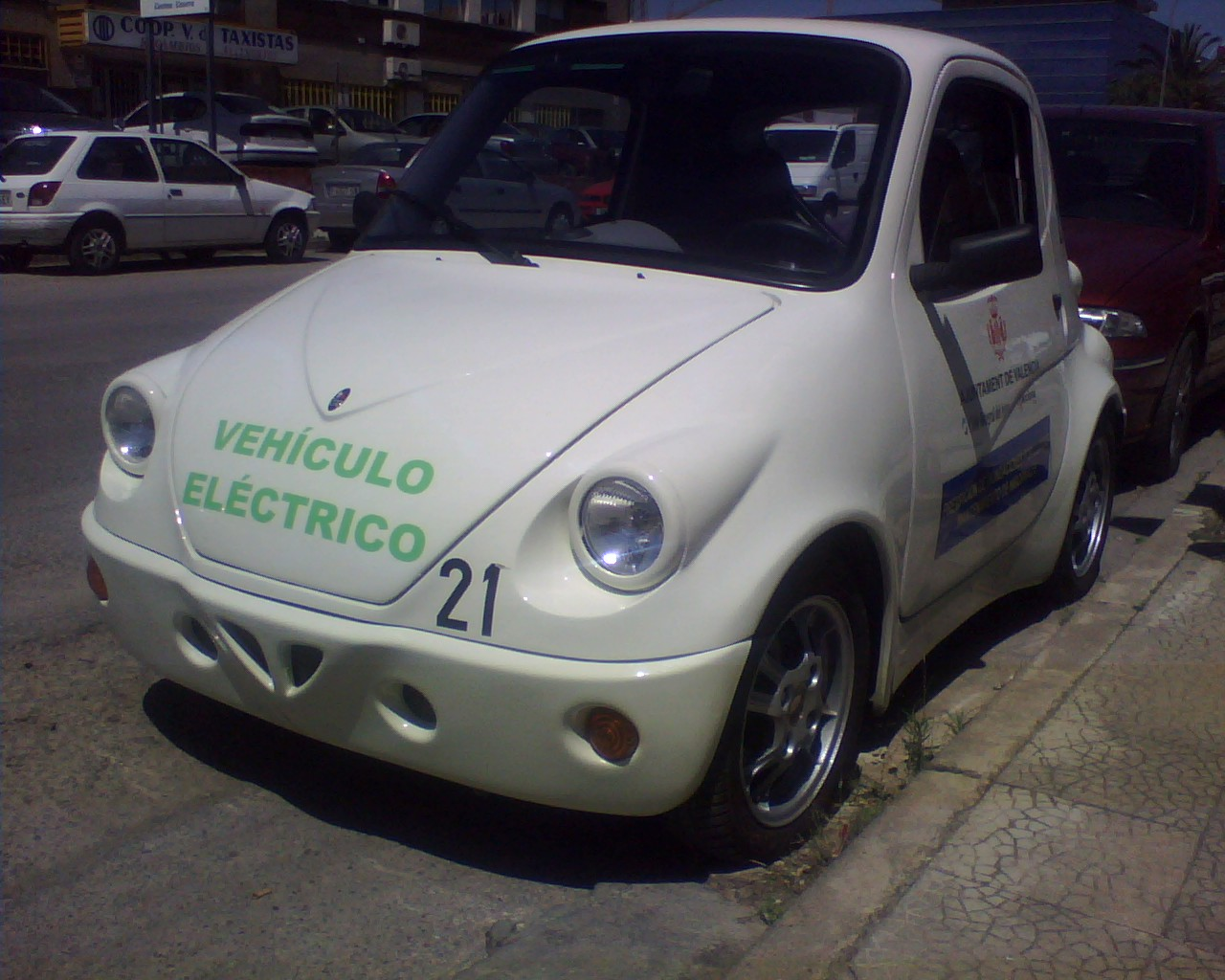
- Town Life Helektra seen in Valencia, Spain

Overview
- Manufacturer: Town Life S.p.A.
- Production: 2000–2008
- Assembly: Magione, Italy
- Designer: Tonino Lamborghini

Body and chassis
- Class: Quadricycle
- Body style: 2-door coupe 2-door convertible
- Related: Iso Isigó

Powertrain
- Engine: Gasoline, Diesel or Electric

Dimensions
- Length: 2.52 m (99.2 in)
- Width: 1.42 m (55.9 in)
- Height: 1.38 m (54.3 in)

The Town Life is an Italian microcar. The vehicle was created by the Tonino Lamborghini Group, a company run by the son of Ferruccio Lamborghini.

There is no relation between this company and the more famous Lamborghini other than trademarks.

Examples of the Town Life and golf carts produced by the Tonino Lamborghini Group are displayed at the Lamborghini museum, Centro Polifunzionale Ferruccio Lamborghini.

== History ==
This vehicle was first displayed at the 1999 Bologna Motor Show by the Tonino Lamborghini Group. A company, Town Life S.p.A., was created to manufacture this car, and a plant was purchased from the bankrupt ISO company in Magione.

Production started in January 2000.

== Models ==
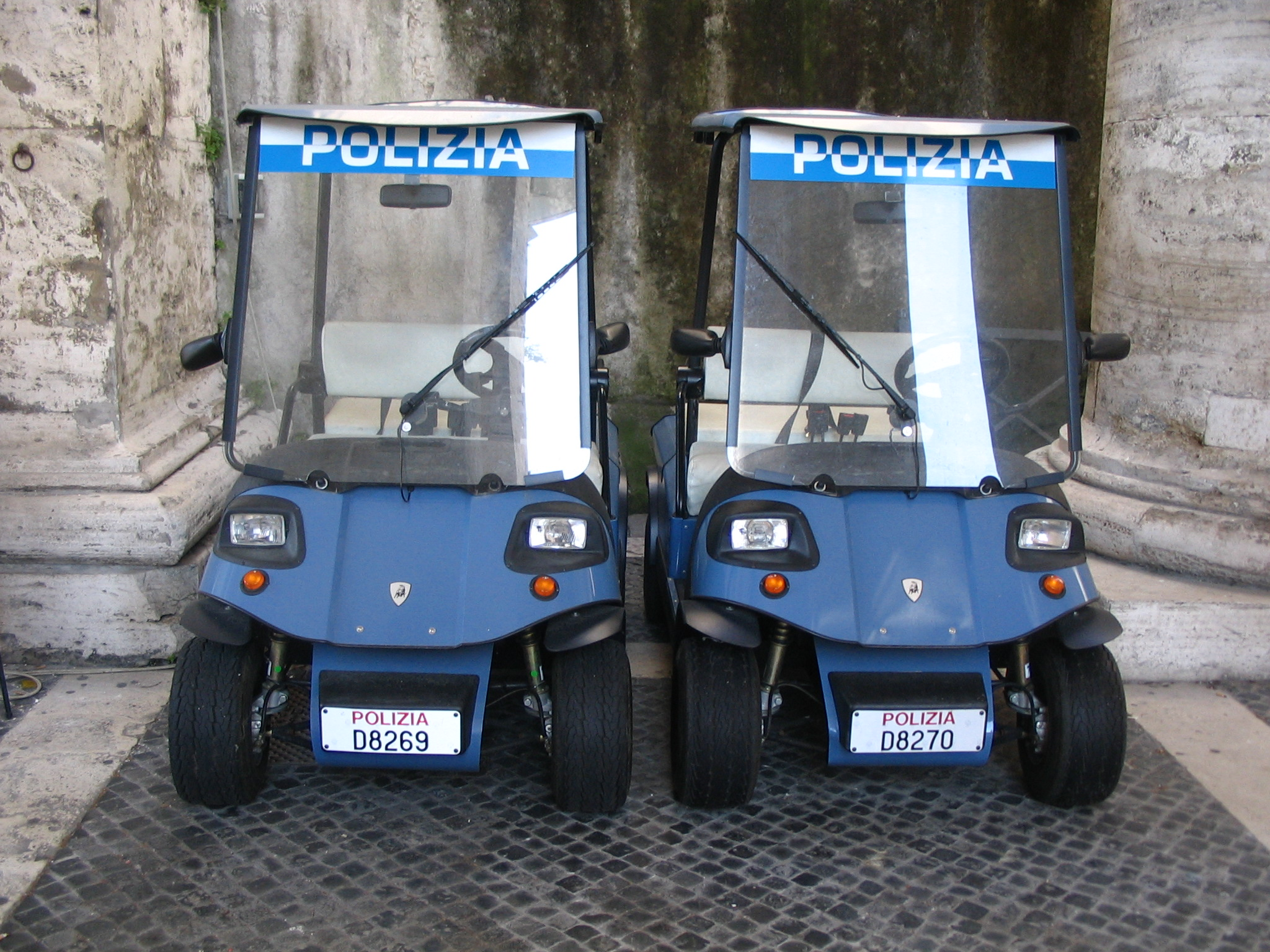
Italian State Police utility carts produced by Town Life S.p.A. in Vatican City.

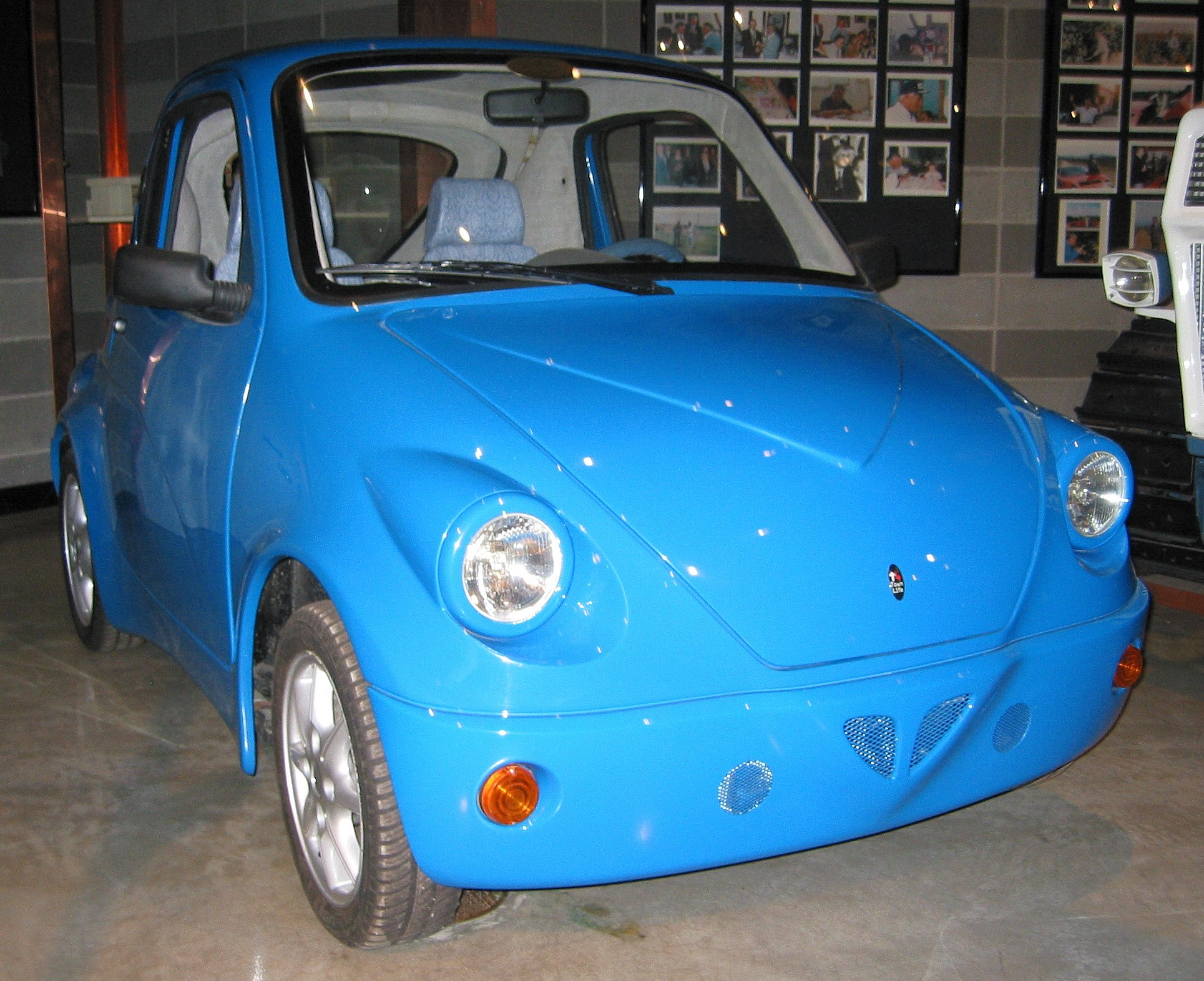
Town Life Ginevra

Two versions are available: the Ginevra has a 505cc gasoline or a 505cc diesel engine, and the Helektra which comes with an electric motor. Both a coupe and convertible version of this fiberglass body vehicle are listed as available.

It can be driven by people as young as 14 in Italy using a moped license.

A high performance version, the Ginevra GTB Sport, was announced in 2006.

In 2010, the Tonino Lamborghini Group announced plans to build electric cars in Montenegro.
