= Jaroslav Plesl =

Czech actor

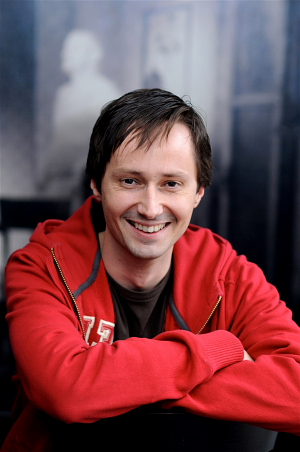
- Born: 20 October 1974 (age 51); Hradec Králové, Czechoslovakia
- Occupation: Actor
- Years active: 1998–present

Jaroslav Plesl (born 20 October 1974) is a Czech actor.

== Selected filmography ==
=== Film ===
- Grandhotel (2006)
- Men in Rut (2009)
- Největší z Čechů (2010)
- Sunday League – Pepik Hnatek's Final Match (2012)
- Family Film (2015)
- Murder in Polná (2016)
- A Vote for the King of the Romans (2016)
- Toman (2018)
- Rašín (2018)
- The Watchmaker's Apprentice (2019)
- Cook F**K Kill (2019)
- Emergency Situation (2022)
- Arvéd (2022)
- The Last Race (2022)
- Changes (2026)

=== Television ===
- Helena (2012)
- Čtvrtá hvězda (2014)
- Autobazar Monte Karlo (2015)
- Život a doba soudce A. K. (2017)
- Zkáza Dejvického divadla (2019)
- Zločiny Velké Prahy (2021)
- Ochránce (2021)
- Tajemství pana M. (2022)
- Stíny v mlze (2022)
- The King of Šumava: The Phantom of the Dark Land (2022)
