= Emergency Situation =

- Directed by: Jiří Havelka
- Starring: Jana Plodková; Igor Chmela; Jenovéfa Boková; Jaroslav Plesl
- Cinematography: Martin Štěpánek
- Music by: Martin Hůla
- Distributed by: CinemArt
- Release date: 3 February 2022
- Running time: 103 minutes
- Country: Czech Republic
- Language: Czech
- Box office: 17,099,412 CZK

Emergency Situation (Czech: Mimořádná událost) is a 2022 Czech comedy film directed by Jiří Havelka. It is classified as a chamber tragicomedy. The plot takes place over the course of one day, and the initial idea of the screenwriter and director Havelka was brought about by a real event, when in February 2019, a train with passengers ran several kilometers without a driver on the Křižanov–Studenec railway line. The premiere date was February 3, 2022.

== Cast ==
- Jana Plodková as Romana
- Igor Chmela as Roman
- Jenovéfa Boková as Kamila
- Jaroslav Plesl as engineer Karaivanov
- Alois Švehlík as Brukner
- Ctirad Götz as gamekeeper
- Tereza Marečková as Soňa
- Václav Kopta as train driver
- Marie Ludvíková as Marie
- Robert Mikluš as adviser
- Fedir Kis as guitar player
- Daniel Horečný as bass player
- Milan Koritják as drummer
- Oliver Vyskočil as Petr
- Václav Vašák as regional council president
- Magdaléna Sidonová as coworker
- Agáta Červinková as secretary
