= Ferruccio Lamborghini =

Italian industrialist, founder of Automobili Lamborghini (1916–1993)

Ferruccio Lamborghini OMRI
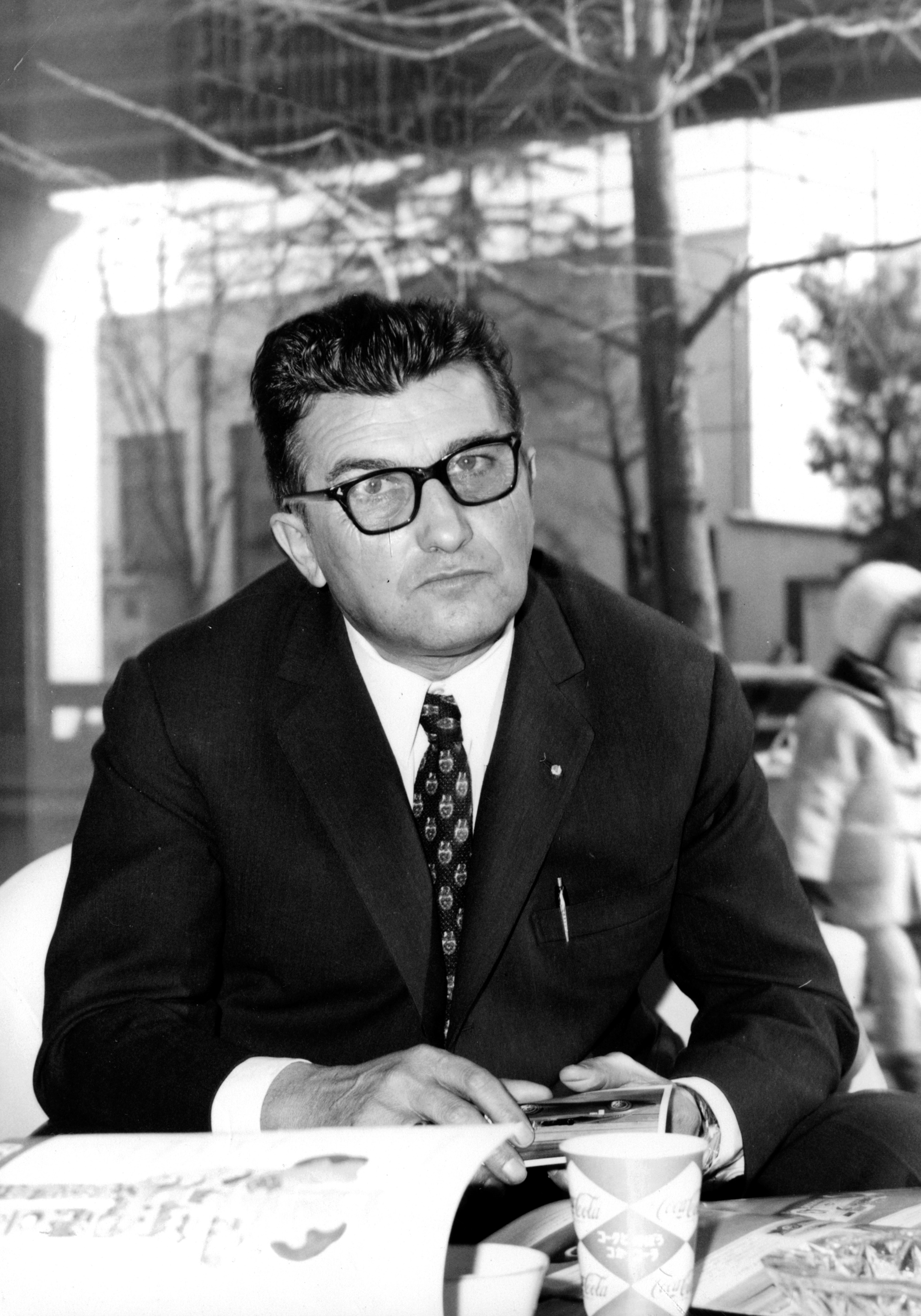
- Born: 28 April 1916; Cento, Kingdom of Italy
- Died: 20 February 1993 (aged 76); Perugia, Italy
- Other name: Ferruccio Lamborghini I
- Education: Istituto Fratelli Taddia
- Occupations: Mechanic; winemaker; industrialist; entrepreneur
- Known for: Founding Lamborghini
- Spouses: Clelia Monti (m. 1946; died 1947); Annita Borgatti (divorced); Maria Teresa Cane
- Children: Tonino; Patrizia
- Relatives: Elettra Lamborghini (granddaughter); Ferruccio Lamborghini II (grandson)

Ferruccio Lamborghini (/ˌlæmbərˈɡiːni/ LAM-bər-GHEE-nee; Italian: [ferˈruttʃo lamborˈɡiːni]; 28 April 1916 – 20 February 1993) was an Italian automobile designer and industrialist who created Lamborghini Trattori in 1948 and Automobili Lamborghini in 1964, a maker of high-end sports cars in Sant'Agata Bolognese.

Born to grape farmers in Renazzo, within the municipality of Cento in the Emilia-Romagna region, his mechanical know-how led him to enter the business of tractor manufacturing in 1948, when he founded Lamborghini Trattori, which quickly became an important manufacturer of agricultural equipment in the midst of Italy's post-WWII economic boom. In 1959, he opened an oil burner factory, Lamborghini Bruciatori, which later entered the business of producing air conditioning equipment.

Lamborghini founded a fourth company, Lamborghini Oleodinamica, in 1969 after creating Automobili Lamborghini in 1963. Lamborghini sold off many of his interests by the late 1970s and retired to an estate in Umbria, where he pursued winemaking.

== Early life ==
Ferruccio Lamborghini was born on 28 April 1916 to viticulturists Antonio and Evelina Lamborghini in house number 22 in Renazzo di Cento, in the Province of Ferrara, in the Emilia-Romagna region of Northern Italy. According to his baptismal certificate, Ferruccio was baptised as a Roman Catholic four days later, on 2 May.

As a young man, Lamborghini was drawn more to farming machinery rather than the farming lifestyle itself. Following his interest in mechanics, Lamborghini studied at the Fratelli Taddia technical institute near Bologna. (Note: Sources do not agree on Ferruccio Lamborghini's area of study. Jolliffe and Willard state that Lamborghini studied engineering, but did not obtain a degree due to his military service obligations. Sackey states that Lamborghini studied industrial design. Lyons et al. state that Lamborghini earned an "industrial arts" degree then pursued an apprenticeship in a Bolognese mechanical shop prior to joining the Italian Royal Air Force. Wood states that Lamborghini was drafted upon graduating in 1940.) In 1940 he was drafted into the Italian Royal Air Force, where he served as a mechanic at the Italian garrison on the island of Rhodes, a territory of the Kingdom of Italy since 1911, after the Italo-Turkish War, becoming the supervisor of the vehicle maintenance unit. He found the opportunity to experiment with his mechanical skills as a repair technician at the 50th mixed motor unit (a military base in Rhodes in the Italian Dodecanese).

In July 1943, Italy deposed Mussolini, and in early September negotiated the Armistice of Cassibile with the Allies, which triggered the German Operation Achse to disarm the Italian forces before they once again could fight against their former allies Austria and Germany, like they had done in 1915. In the Battle of Rhodes, most Italian soldiers either fled or were among the 30,000 Italians captured as prisoners of war. Lamborghini initially escaped capture but later returned to his former workplace in civilian clothes, working several odd jobs, and with the permission of the German forces opened a small vehicle workshop.

When the island fell to the British at the end of the war in 1945 he was arrested as a collaborator, and was not able to return home to Italy until the following year. In 1946, he married Clelia Monti (a native of Ferrara whom he had met in Rhodes during the war) in the church of Santa Maria in Vado in Ferrara. On October 13, 1947, their son Tonino was born, but Clelia died giving birth. In 1948, Lamborghini met Annita Borgatti, a 24-year-old teacher and daughter of the owners of the Fontana Hotel in Cento, who would accompany him in running his businesses for over thirty years.

Lamborghini's passion for engines and machines led him to work in a company that overhauled military vehicles. In 1946, the growing demand for tractors in the Italian market, combined with the experience gained in repairs, pushed Lamborghini to pursue a career as an entrepreneur in the production of tractors. He bought surplus military vehicles from the war and transformed them into agricultural machines.

=== After World War II ===
After World War II, Lamborghini opened a garage in Pieve di Cento. Lamborghini modified an old Fiat Topolino he had purchased (the first of many that he would own), and in his spare time he made tractors which would be the first Lamborghinis he would make. He made use of his mechanical abilities to transform the homely city car into a roaring 750-cc open-top two-seater and entered the car in the 1948 Mille Miglia. His participation ended after 1,100 kilometres (680 mi) when he ran the car into the side of a restaurant in the town of Fano, in the province of Pesaro and Urbino.

=== Beginnings of entrepreneurship ===
In 1947 Ferruccio Lamborghini recognized an emerging market in post-War Italy devoted to agricultural and industrial revitalization. Using parts from military vehicle engines and differentials from ARAR centres, Lamborghini built the first of his "Carioca" tractors, themselves based on the six-cylinder petrol engines of Morris trucks.

As petrol in Italy was prohibitively priced, Lamborghini augmented the Morris engines with a fuel atomiser of his own creation, which allowed the tractors to be started with petrol, then switch to the cheaper diesel fuel. Based on the initial success of the Carioca, Lamborghini founded Lamborghini Trattori and began manufacturing tractors.

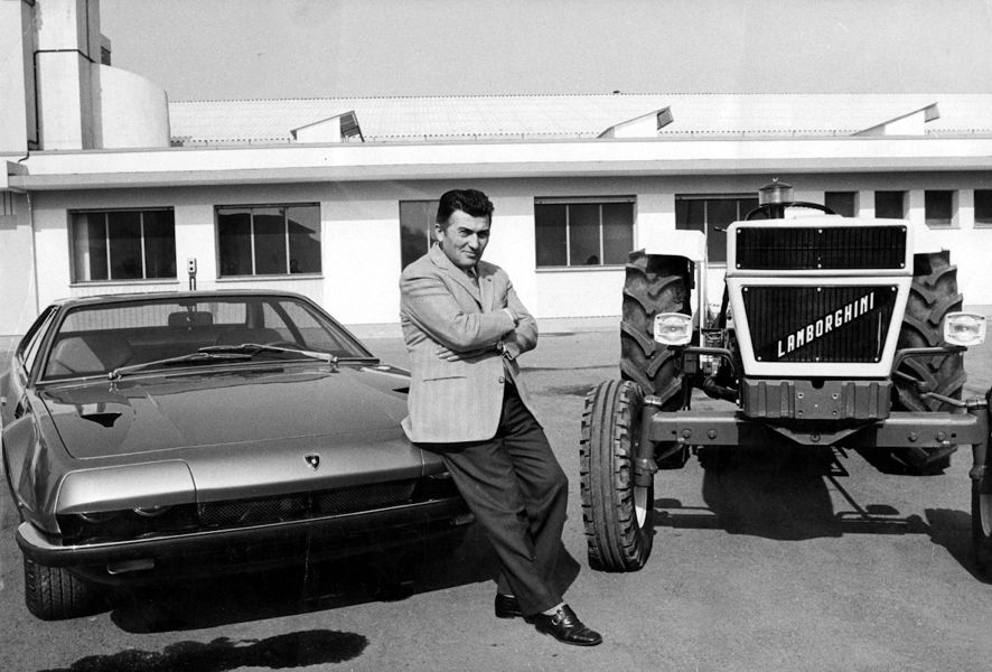
Ferruccio Lamborghini between a "Jarama" and a tractor

=== Involvement with boats ===
A Riva Aquarama Lamborghini (Hull #278) was registered and delivered on 7 June 1968 to Lamborghini. The boat was the first and only one fitted with two Lamborghini engines, and it had a special side railing for holding on to during water-skiing and record attempts. The engine compartment was modified to fit the engines and a special open exhaust was built to meet Lamborghini's demands.

He owned the boat for over 20 years until July 1988, when he sold it to Angelo Merli, a close friend.

=== Involvement with automobiles ===
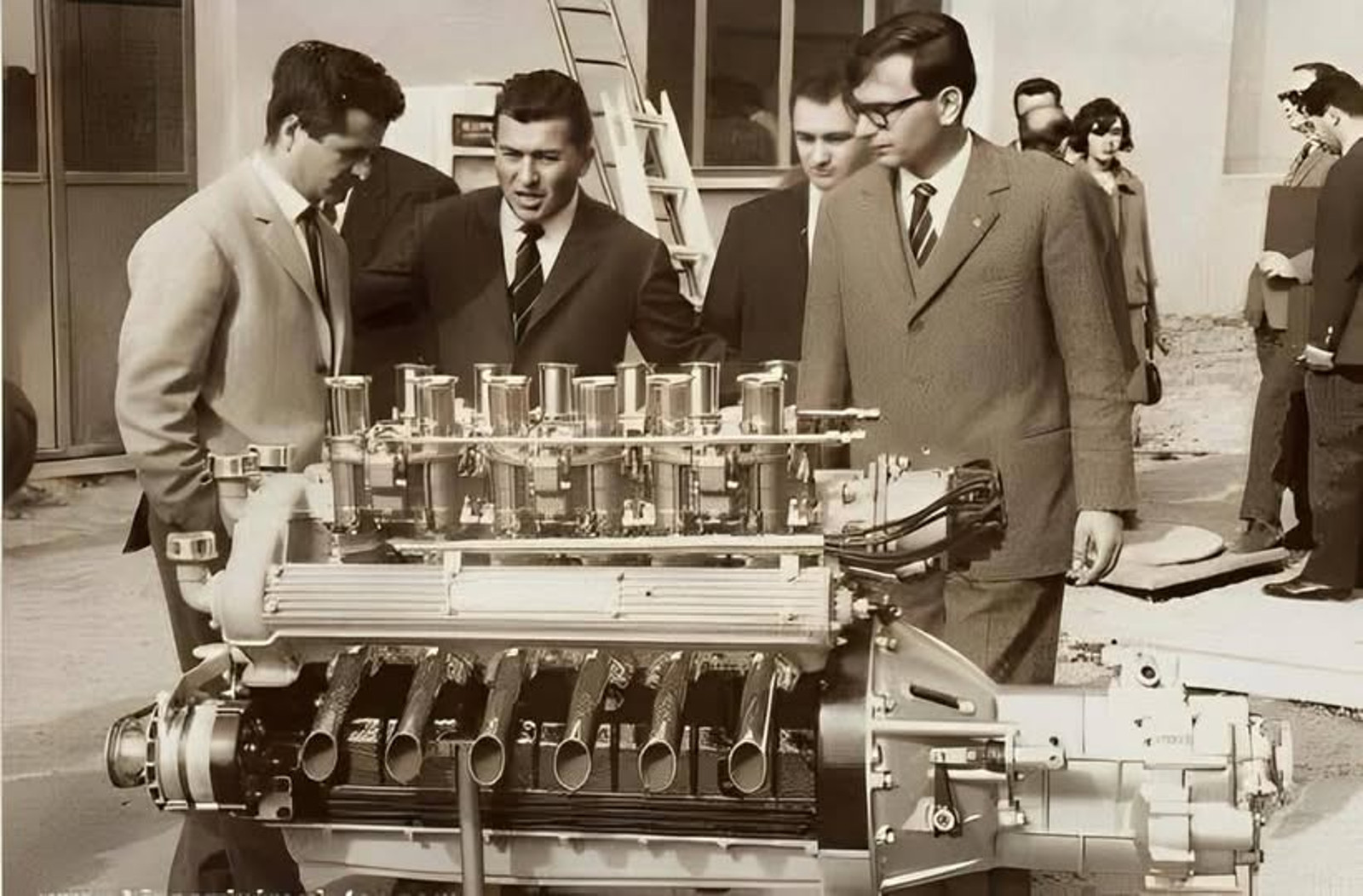
From left to right: Giotto Bizzarrini, Ferruccio Lamborghini and Giampaolo Dallara at Sant'Agata Bolognese in 1963, with a Lamborghini V12 engine prototype

Lamborghini's increasing wealth allowed him to purchase faster, more expensive cars than the tiny Fiats he had tinkered with during his youth. He owned cars such as Alfa Romeos and Lancias during the early 1950s and at one point he had enough cars to use a different one every day of the week, adding a Mercedes-Benz 300SL, a Jaguar E-Type coupé, and two Maserati 3500 GTs. Of the latter, Lamborghini said, "Adolfo Orsi, then the owner of Maserati, was a man I had a lot of respect for: he had started life as a poor boy, like myself. But I did not like his cars much. They felt heavy and did not really go very fast."

In 1958, Lamborghini traveled to Maranello to buy a Ferrari 250 GT: a two-seat coupé with a body designed by coachbuilder Pininfarina. He went on to own several more over the years, including a Scaglietti-designed 250 GT SWB Berlinetta and a 250 GT 2+2 four-seater. Lamborghini thought Ferrari's cars were good, but too noisy and rough to be proper road cars. He categorized them as repurposed track cars with poorly built interiors.

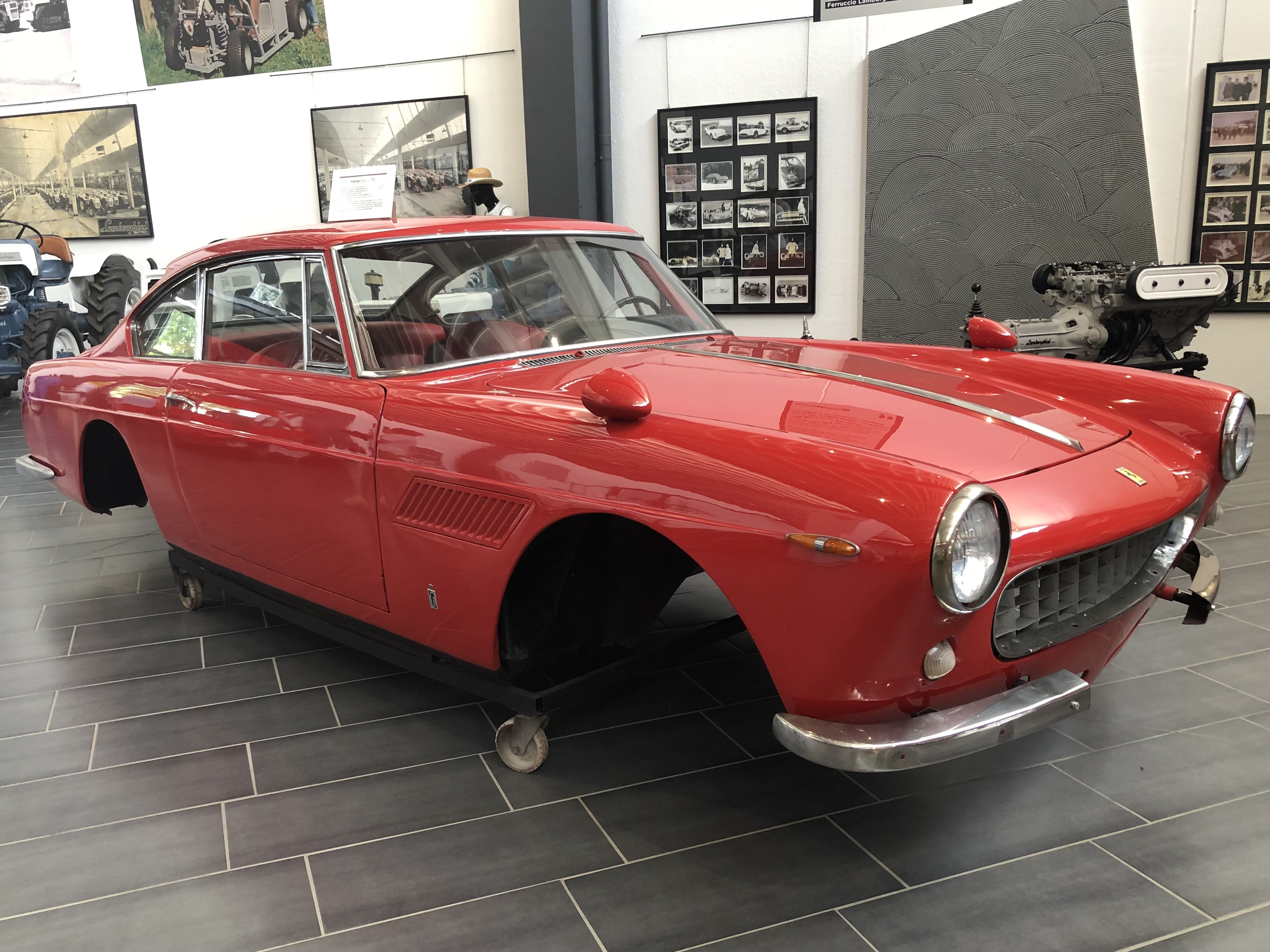
One of Ferruccio Lamborghini's own Ferrari 250s in the Museo Ferruccio Lamborghini

Lamborghini found that Ferrari's cars were equipped with inferior clutches, and required continuous trips to Maranello for rebuilds; technicians would secrete the car away for several hours to perform the work, much to Lamborghini's annoyance. He had previously expressed dissatisfaction with Ferrari's after sales service, which he perceived to be substandard. Lamborghini brought his misgivings to Enzo Ferrari's attention, but was dismissed by Ferrari. (Note: The exchange between Enzo Ferrari and Ferruccio Lamborghini is often cited as a primary factor that motivated Lamborghini to become an auto manufacturer, but the story is as much the stuff of legend as it is of fact. In a 1991 Thoroughbred & Classic Cars interview, Lamborghini said that after the clutch problems <with his Ferrari> continued to go unresolved, "I decided to talk to Enzo Ferrari. I had to wait for him a very long time. 'Ferrari, your cars are rubbish!' I complained. Il Commendatore was furious. 'Lamborghini, you may be able to drive a tractor but you will never be able to handle a Ferrari properly.' This was the point when I finally decided to make a perfect car." Other versions of the story center around several basic points: Lamborghini visited Ferrari, proceeded to challenge, deride or demand improvements to his car from Ferrari, and was dismissed as a mere tractor manufacturer by Ferrari. Whether Lamborghini's spite was enough of a reason to enter the auto manufacturing business, or if the exchange inspired further business interests or merely served as an anecdote, is unknown. Sackey writes that the economic motives for entering the high-profit-margin sports car business far outweighed Lamborghini's personal sentiments. In the 1991 Thoroughbred & Classic Cars interview, Lamborghini states that "Ferrari never spoke to me again. He was a great man, I admit, but it was so very easy to upset him.") After successfully modifying one of his personally owned Ferrari 250 GTs to outperform stock models, Lamborghini gained the impetus to pursue an automobile manufacturing venture of his own, aiming to create the perfect touring car that he felt no one could build for him. Lamborghini believed that a grand tourer should have attributes that were lacking in Ferrari's offerings, namely high performance without compromising tractability, ride quality, and interior appointments. A clever businessman, Lamborghini also knew that he could make triple the profit if the components used in his tractors were installed in a high-performance exotic car instead.

== Automobili Lamborghini ==
=== Departure from Macchina Lamborghini ===
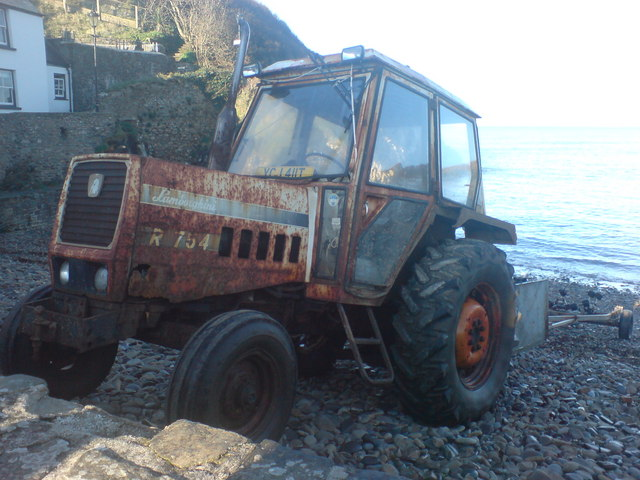
An aged Lamborghini R 754, originally produced a few years after Lamborghini had sold Trattori to SAME

During the 1970s, Ferruccio Lamborghini's companies began to run into financial difficulties. In 1971, Lamborghini Trattori, which exported around half of its production of tractors, ran into trouble when its South African importer cancelled all its orders. In Bolivia, the new military government, which had recently staged a successful coup d'état, cancelled a large order of tractors that was being prepared for shipment in Genoa. Trattori's unionised employees could not be laid off, putting immense strain on the company. In 1972, Lamborghini sold his entire holding in the company to rival tractor builder SAME. Soon, the entire Lamborghini group found itself in financial trouble. Development at the automaker slowed as costs were cut. Ferruccio Lamborghini began courting buyers for Automobili and Trattori, entering negotiations with Georges-Henri Rossetti, a wealthy Swiss businessman and friend. Ferruccio sold Rossetti 51% of the company for US$600,000, thereby relinquishing control of the automaker he had founded. He continued to work at the Sant'Agata factory; Rossetti rarely involved himself in Automobili's affairs.

The situation did not improve: the 1973 oil crisis plagued sales of high-performance cars of manufacturers from around the world. Consumers flocked to smaller, more practical modes of transportation with better fuel economy. By 1974, Ferruccio had become disenchanted with his car business. He severed all connections with the cars that bore his name, selling his remaining 49% stake in the automaker. The shares were acquired by René Leimer, a friend of Georges-Henri Rossetti.

After departing the automobile manufacturing business, Lamborghini continued his business activities in other areas, including his heating and air conditioning company, Lamborghini Calor. In 1969, he founded Lamborghini Oleodinamica S.p.A., a manufacturer of hydraulic valves and equipment.

== Later life ==
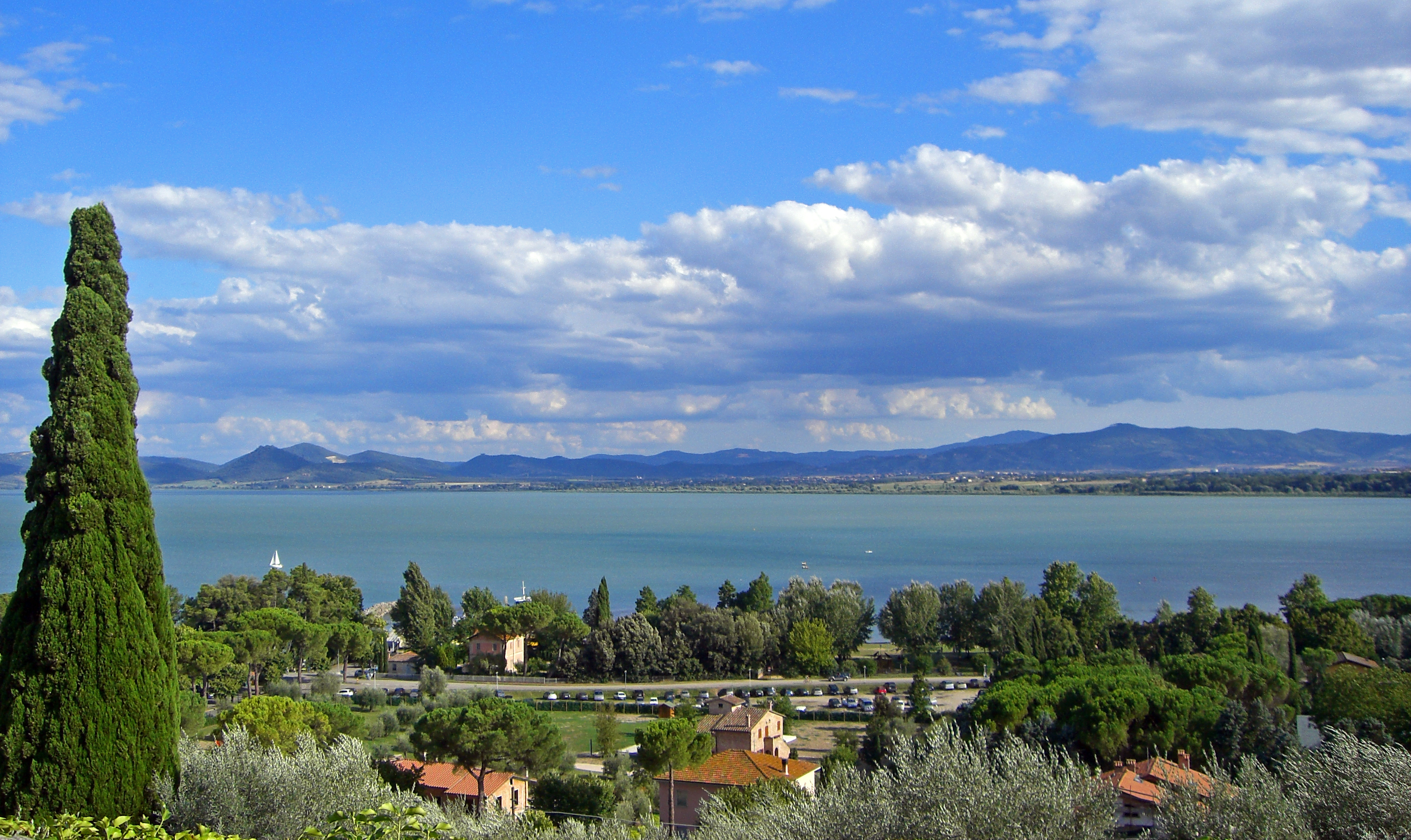
Ferruccio retired to his estate, "La Fiorita" at Lake Trasimeno, continuing to manage his other businesses while pursuing personal interests.

In 1974, Lamborghini exited the industrial world and retired to a 3 km^{2} (740-acre) estate named "La Fiorita" on the shores of Lake Trasimeno, in Castiglione del Lago, Umbria. Returning to his farming roots, Lamborghini delighted in hunting and producing his own wines. Lamborghini designed his own golf course.

At 76 years of age, on 20 February 1993, Lamborghini died at Silvestrini Hospital in Perugia after having suffered a heart attack 15 days earlier. Lamborghini is buried at the cemetery of Renazzo.

== Fascination with bullfighting ==
Bullfighting is a key part of Lamborghini's identity. In 1962, Ferruccio Lamborghini visited the Seville ranch of Eduardo Miura, a renowned breeder of Spanish fighting bulls. Lamborghini, a Taurus himself, was so impressed by the Miura animals that he decided to adopt a raging bull as the emblem for the auto company he would soon found.

After producing two cars with alphanumeric designations, Lamborghini once again turned to the bull breeder for inspiration. Eduardo Miura was proud when he learned that Ferruccio had named a car after his family and their line of bulls; the fourth Miura to be produced was unveiled to him at his ranch in Seville.

The car manufacturer continued to draw upon the bullfighting connection in future years. The Islero was named for the Miura bull that killed the bullfighter Manolete in 1947. Espada is the Spanish word for sword, sometimes used to refer to the bullfighter himself. The Jarama's name had a special double meaning; intended to refer only to the historic bullfighting region in Spain, Ferruccio was concerned about confusion with the also historic Jarama motor racing track.

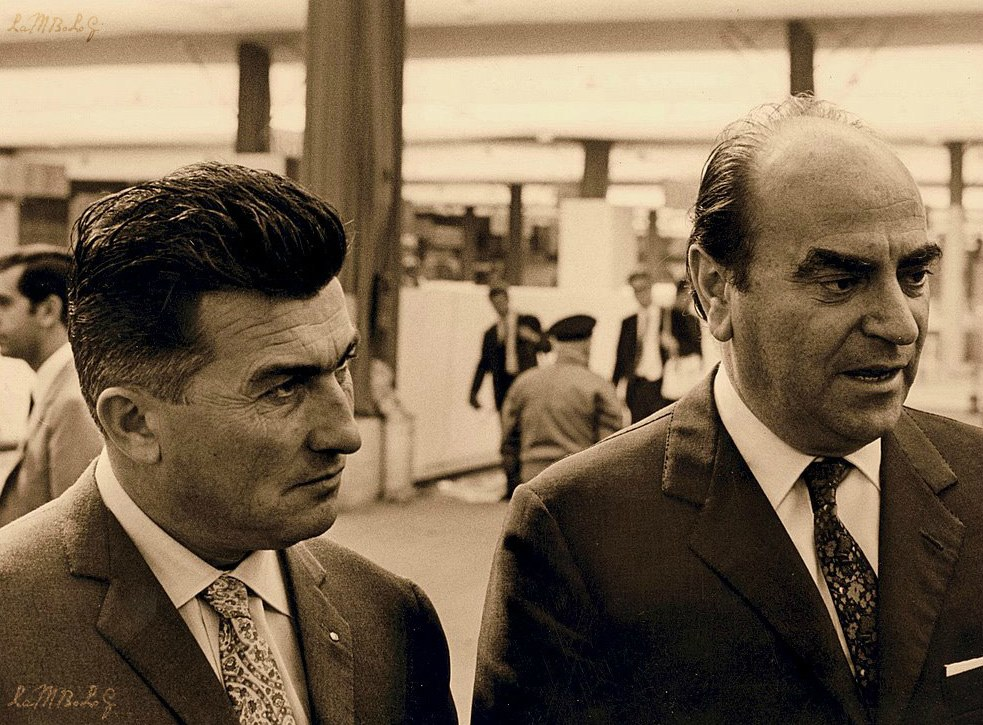
Lamborghini with Nuccio Bertone in the late 1960s

After naming the Urraco after a bull breed, in 1974, Lamborghini broke from tradition, naming the Countach not after a bull, but after contacc, a Piedmontese exclamation of astonishment. Legend has it that Nuccio Bertone uttered the word in surprise when he first laid eyes on the Countach prototype, "Project 112". The LM002 sport utility vehicle and the Silhouette were other exceptions to the tradition.

The Jalpa of 1982 was named after a bull breed; the Diablo of 1990, after the Duke of Veragua's ferocious bull famous for fighting an epic battle against "El Chicorro" in Madrid in 1869.

Even after Ferruccio's death the tradition was maintained: Murciélago, the bull who survived 28 sword strokes and whose life was spared by "El Lagartijo" for his performance in 1879; Gallardo, named after one of the five ancestral castes of the Spanish fighting bull breed; and Reventón, the bull that defeated young Mexican torero Félix Guzmán in 1943. The Estoque concept of 2008 was named after the estoc, the sword traditionally used by matadors during bullfights, while the replacement for the Murcielago, the Aventador (unveiled in 2011) was named after a bull that was bred by the sons of Don Celestino Cuadri Vides. This bull was killed in a particularly gruesome fight, where after the bull was killed, its left ear was cut off and given to the Matador as a token of good luck.

== Legacy ==
All of Ferruccio Lamborghini's companies continue to operate today in one form or another. His son, Tonino, designs a collection of clothing and accessories under the Tonino Lamborghini brand, as well as designing the Town Life, an electric microcar which was revealed at the Bologna Motor Show in 1999. Ferruccio's daughter, Patrizia Lamborghini, runs the Lamborghini winery on his Umbria estate. In 1995 son Tonino opened a museum that honors Lamborghini's legacy, the Centro Studi e Ricerche Ferruccio Lamborghini in Dosso (Ferrara), which was moved to Argelato (Bologna) in 2014 with the new name Museo Lamborghini.

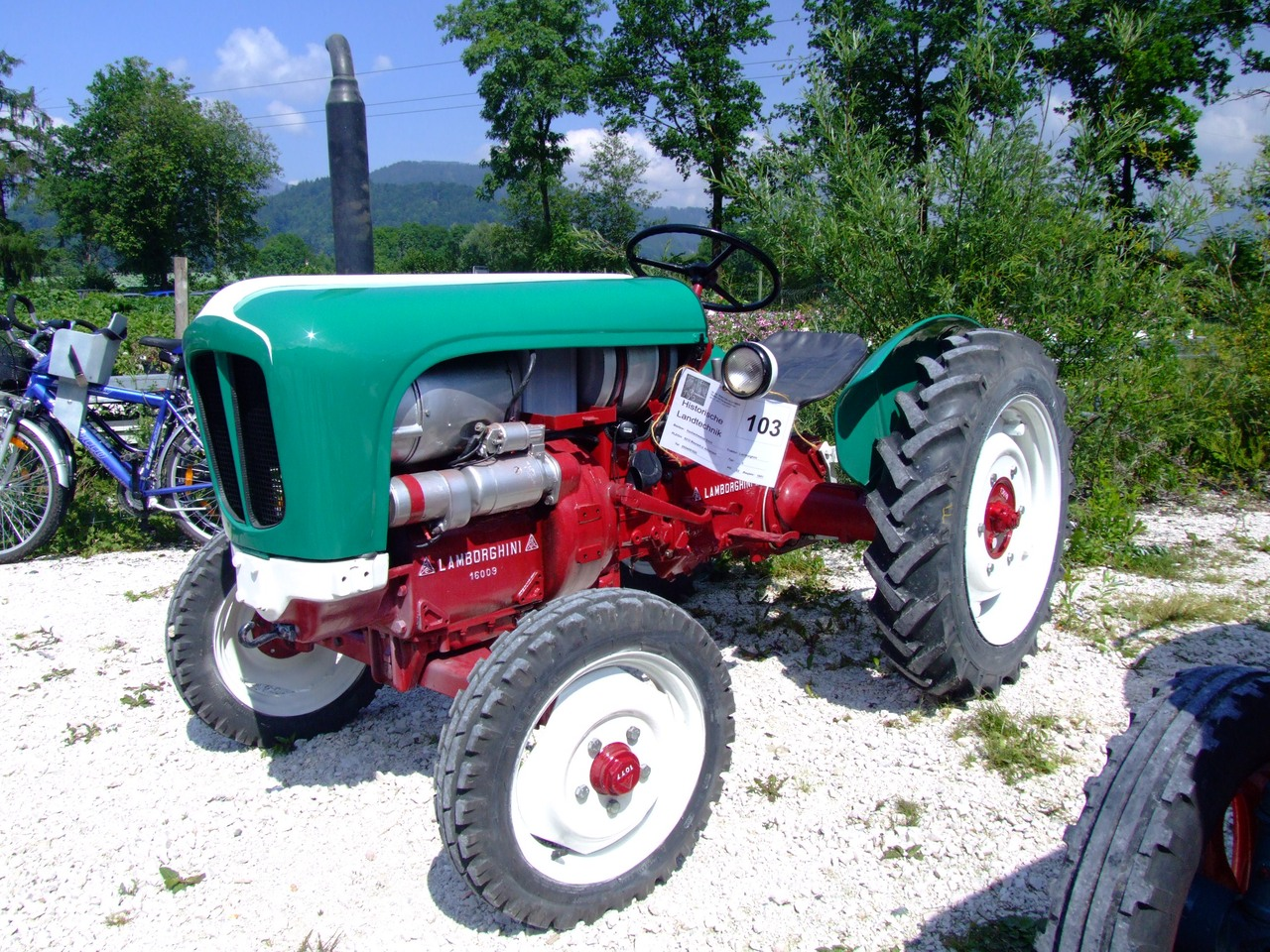
A Lamborghini 2200PS from 1951

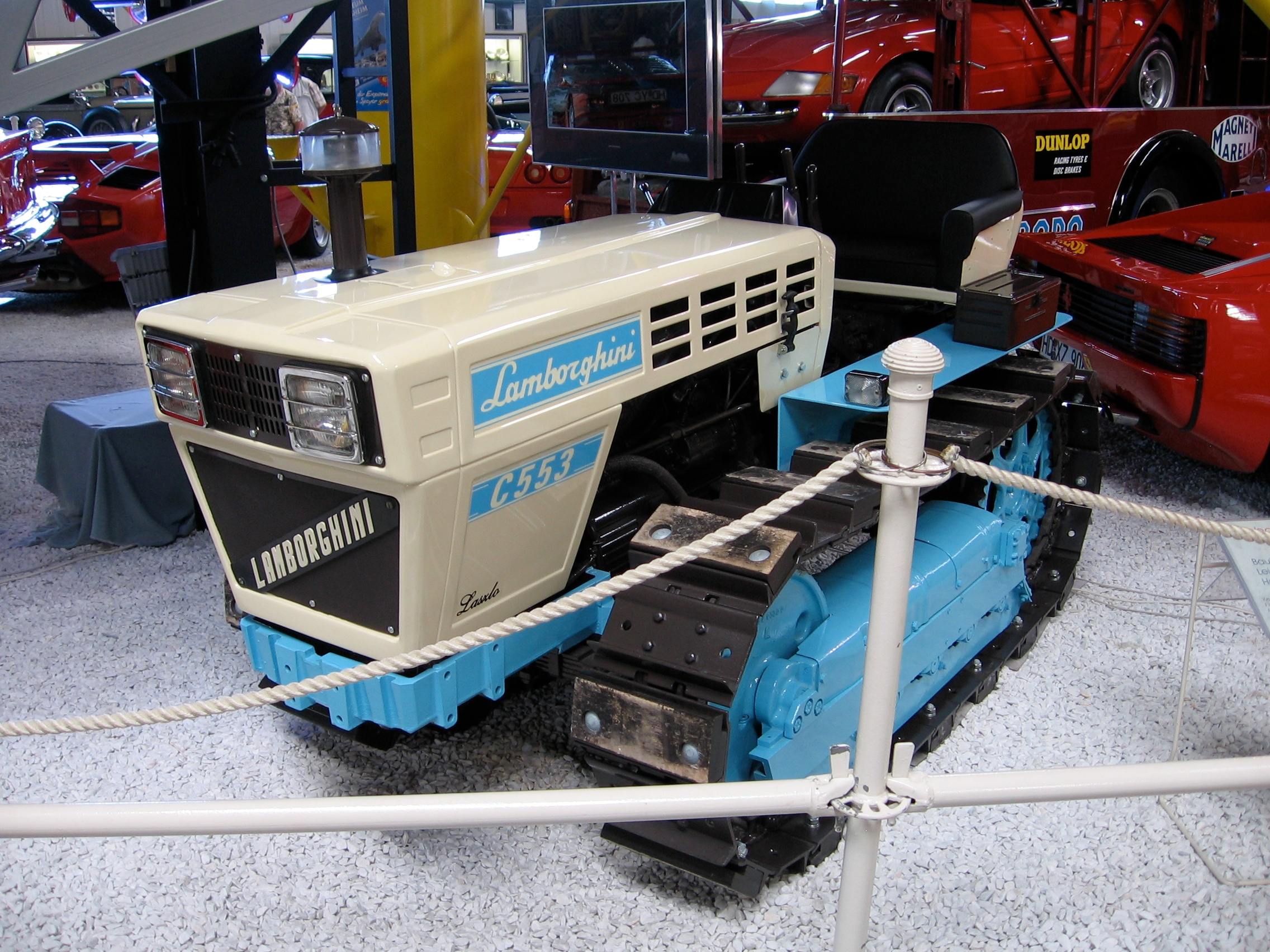
A C553 crawler from the 1970s

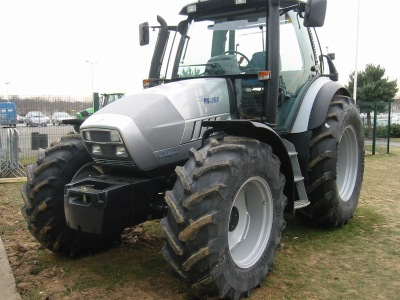
A modern Lamborghini R6-150 tractor

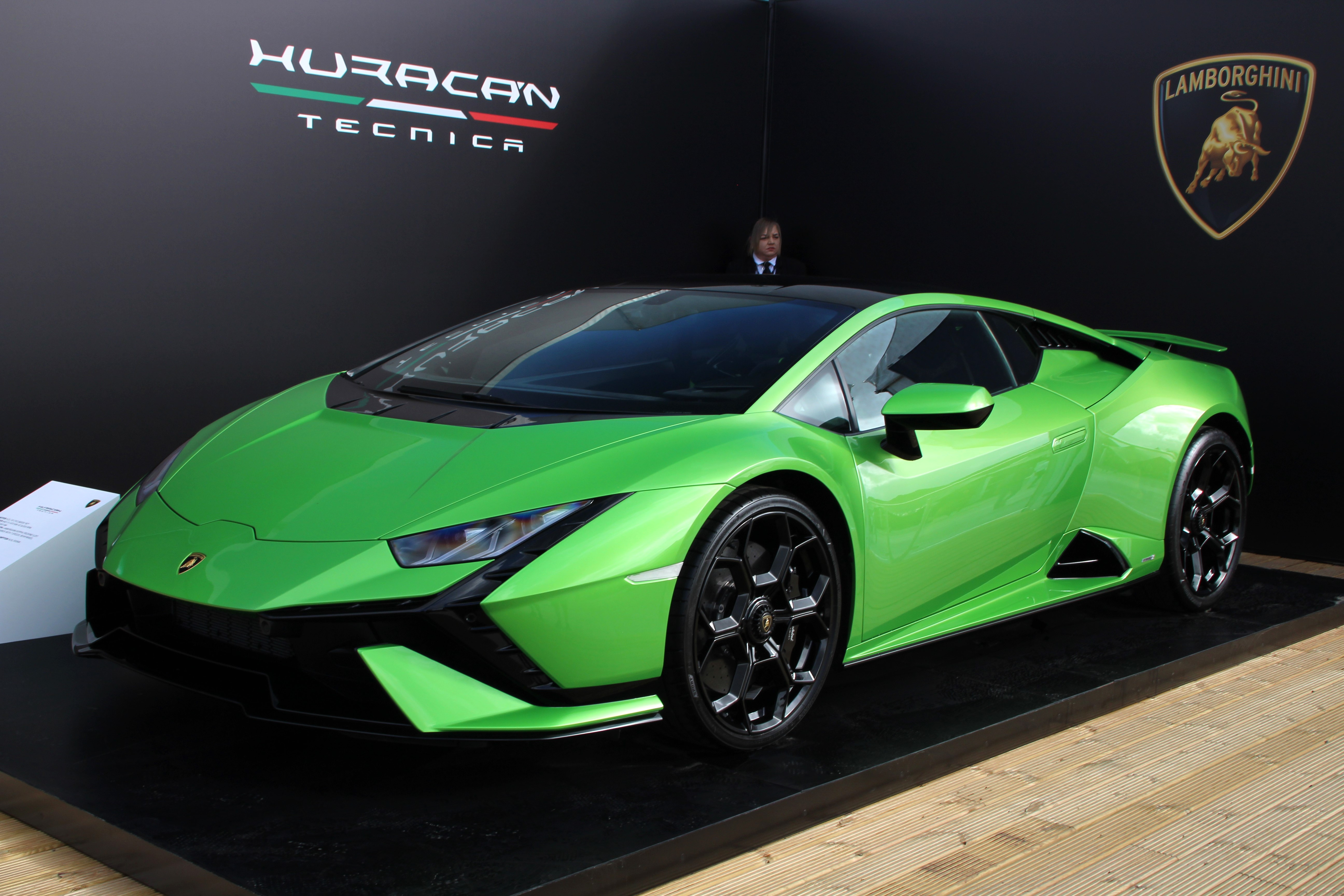
The automaker bearing Lamborghini's name continues to produce sports cars (Huracán Tecnica pictured).

== Cinema ==
- In 2022, the biographical film Lamborghini: The Man Behind the Legend was released.

== Sources ==
- Cockerham, Paul W. (September 1996). Lamborghini: The Spirit of the Bull (Hardcover ed.). New York City, New York: Smithmark Publishers. ISBN 978-0765196262.
- Cowell, Alan (22 February 1993). "Ferruccio Lamborghini, 76, Dies; A Top Maker of Stylish Sports Cars". New York Times. New York City, New York. ISSN 0362-4331. Archived from the original on 20 April 2013.
- Jolliffe, David; Willard, Tony (19 September 2004). Lamborghini: Forty Years (Hardcover ed.). St. Paul, Minnesota: Motorbooks. doi:10.1007/b62130. ISBN 978-0760319451.
- Lawrence, Mike (7 October 1996) [1991]. A to Z of Sports Cars, 1945–1990: The Encyclopaedic Guide to More Than 850 Marques and Thousands of Models (Paperback ed.). St. Paul, Minnesota: MBI Publishing Company. ISBN 978-1870979818.
- Lyons, Pete (9 June 1988). The Complete Book of Lamborghini (Hardcover ed.). Woodstock, New York: Beekman House. ISBN 9780854297351.
- Sackey, Joe (15 November 2008). The Lamborghini Miura Bible (Hardcover ed.). Dorchester, England: Veloce Publishing. ISBN 978-1845841966.
- Schleifer, Jay (May 1993). Lamborghini: Italy's Raging Bull. Crestwood House. ISBN 978-0896866980.
