= Victim (2022 film) =

- Film poster
- Directed by: Michal Blaško
- Written by: Jakub Medvecký
- Produced by: Pavla Kubeckova; Jakub Viktorin; Saar Yogev
- Starring: Vita Smachelyuk; Gleb Kuchuk; Igor Chmela
- Cinematography: Adam Mach
- Edited by: Petr Hasalík
- Distributed by: Bontonfilm
- Release dates: September 5, 2022 (Venice Film Festival); September 11, 2022 (Slovakia)
- Running time: 91 minutes
- Countries: Slovakia; Czech Republic; Germany
- Languages: Czech; Ukrainian; Russian
- Box office: 4 689

Victim (Czech: Oběť) is a 2022 thriller drama film directed by Michal Blaško and written by Jakub Medvecký. A co-production between Slovakia, Czech Republic and Germany, the film premiered at the Horizons section of the 79th edition of the Venice Film Festival. It was selected as the Slovak entry for the Best International Feature Film at the 95th Academy Awards. It won two Sun in a Net Awards including Best Film and Best Director.

== Plot ==
Ukrainian Irina lives with her son Igor in a small Czech border town. One night she discovers that Igor has been assaulted by three Romas. Her whole world comes crashing down when she learns that his gymnastic career is over because of the injury. Irina tries to find justice in the society and raises media attention to find the attackers. The whole city stands up in solidarity with her family and condemns their Roma neighbors, who allegedly committed the crime.

Igor wakes up from the surgery and is shocked and surprised by the public attention his mother gets. The investigations continues and Igor starts to talk about what really happened during the attack, but Irina begins to spot inconsistencies in his story.

== Cast ==
- Vita Smachelyuk as Irina Zyrchenko
- Gleb Kuchuk as Igor Zyrchenko
- Igor Chmela as investigator Novotný
- Viktor Zavadil as Michal Selský
- Inna Zhulina as Maryna
- Alena Mihulová as Boss Alena
- Veronika Weinhold as Lenka
- Gabriela Mícová as Mayor
- Klaudia Dudová as Klaudia (as Claudia Dudová)

== Release ==
The film had its world premiere at the Horizons section of the 79th edition of the Venice Film Festival. It was later screened at various festivals, including the 47th Toronto Film Festival, the 28th Kolkata International Film Festival, Cairo International Film Festival or the 27th Busan International Film Festival.

== Reception ==
The film was nominated to four Czech Lion Awards, for best film, best director, best screenplay and best actress. It was selected as the Slovak entry for the Best International Feature Film at the 95th Academy Awards. Victim won two Czech Film Critics' Awards including Best Actress and Best Debut.
