= The King of Šumava: The Phantom of the Dark Land =

2022 Czech adventure TV series

- Genre: Adventure Crime thriller
- Directed by: David Ondříček; Damián Vondrášek
- Starring: Oskar Hes
- Country of origin: Czech Republic
- Original language: Czech
- No. of seasons: 2
- No. of episodes: 9

Production
- Running time: 45 minutes

Original release
- Network: Voyo (Season 1); Oneplay (Season 2)
- Release: December 9, 2022 – April 18, 2025

The King of Šumava: The Phantom of the Dark Land (Czech: Král Šumavy: Fantom temného kraje) is a Czech adventure series. Season 1 was directed by David Ondříček and produced by the production company Lucky Man Films. The series was filmed under the brand Voyo Original. The script was written by Tomáš Vávra and David Ondříček.

Oskar Hes, Jan Nedbal, Halka Třešňáková, Vojtěch Vodochodský, Jan Hájek, Jana Pidrmanová, Gabriela Heclová, Jan Jankovský, Kryštof Mucha, Kristýna Podzimková, Judit Bárdos, Petr Forman, Denis Šafařík, Jaroslav Plesl, Jiří Zeman, Daniela Hirsch and others starred in the series.

The series premiered on 23 September 2022 at the Serial Killer international series festival in Brno.

On 23 February 2023 Nova announced that the series was renewed for season 2 and season 3 each consisting of 3 episodes. Shooting of season 2 and 3 started in October 2023, directed by David Ondrášek. It was eventually decided that season 2 and 3 will be produced as a single season and thus season 2 consists of 6 episodes titled The King of Šumava: Agent Walker (Král Šumavy: Agent chodec) with broadcast set for Spring 2025.

== Plot ==
The main character of the series Josef Hasil is based on David Jan Žák's novel The Return of the Šumava King. The story starts in the spring of 1948, when Hasil works in the kitchen of the National Security Corps in Zvonková as a cook. He is twenty-four years old. He experienced the war in a German labor camp and among partisans. He is not interested in politics at all, but the rapidly closing borders, the fear of the World War III and his ability to transfer through the Šumava mountains from East to West predestined him to become a smuggler. David Jan Žák's novel is based on Hasil's memories, eyewitness accounts and archive documents.

== Cast ==
- Oskar Hes as Josef Hasil
- Jan Nedbal as Bohumil Hasil
- Halka Třešňáková as Rozálie Hasilová
- Vojtěch Vodochodský as Zdeněk Vyleta
- Jan Hájek as František Vávra
- Jana Pidrmanová as Anna Vávrová
- Gabriela Heclová as Marie Vávrová
- Jan Jankovský as Antonín Podzimek
- Kryštof Mucha as Václav Kott
- Kristýna Podzimková as Vlasta, Josef's lover
- Judit Bárdos as Klára, Josef's lover
- Denis Šafařík as Mlíčňák
- Petr Forman as hlídač Jaromír
- Jaroslav Plesl as second lieutenant Machart
- Jiří Zeman as Egon Brodský
- Daniela Hirsch as Anna Bezcená

== Production ==
Filming for season 1 took place from March to May 2022, and the crew completed 25 filming days at locations in the Central Bohemian, Plzeň and South Bohemian regions. Among other things, filming was also done in Bohemian Forest (Czech: Šumava) in real locations, where the King of Šumava, Josef Hasil, worked with the border guard in the late forties and early fifties. One of the places was the so-called Valley of Death, the area between the Soumar Bridge and the state border.

== Episodes ==
=== Season 1 – The Phantom of the Dark Land ===
No. in season	Title	Directed by	Written by	Original air date (Voyo)	Original air date (Nova)	Czech Republic viewers (millions)
1	"Hranice (Border)"	David Ondříček	Tomáš Vávra, David Ondříček	December 9, 2022	February 2, 2025	1.168
2	"Most (Bridge)"	David Ondříček	Tomáš Vávra, David Ondříček	December 16, 2022	February 9, 2025	0.935
3	"Nevěsta (Bride)"	David Ondříček	Tomáš Vávra, David Ondříček	December 23, 2022	February 16, 2015	0.896

=== Season 2 – Agent Walker ===
No. in season	Title	Directed by	Written by	Original air date (Oneplay)	Original air date (Nova)	Czech Republic viewers (millions)
1	"Soud (Court)"	Damián Vondrášek	Pavel Gotthard	March 14, 2025	TBA	N/A
2	"Klec (Cage)"	Damián Vondrášek	Pavel Gotthard	March 21, 2025	TBA	N/A
3	"Domov (Home)"	Damián Vondrášek	Pavel Gotthard	March 28, 2025	TBA	N/A
4	"Cizinec (Foreigner)"	Damián Vondrášek	Pavel Gotthard	April 4, 2025	TBA	N/A
5	"Past (Trap)"	Damián Vondrášek	Pavel Gotthard	April 11, 2025	TBA	N/A
6	"Opona (Courtain)"	Damián Vondrášek	Pavel Gotthard	April 18, 2025	TBA	N/A

== Reception ==
Series was nominated for Czech Lion Award in categories Best Television Film or Miniseries and Best Music.
