= Stíny v mlze =

- Genre: Crime
- Written by: Zdeněk Zapletal
- Directed by: Radim Špaček
- Starring: Petra Špalková; Jiří Vyorálek
- Country of origin: Czech Republic
- Original language: Czech
- No. of seasons: 2
- No. of episodes: 24

Production
- Running time: 63-78 minutes

Original release
- Network: ČT1
- Release: 3 January 2022 – June 24, 2024

Stíny v mlze (English: Shadows in the Mist) is a 2022 crime drama television series by Czech Television. The premiere on ČT1 screens took place on 3 January 2022. The series was directed by Radim Špaček and the script was written by Zdeněk Zapletal. It consists of 12 episodes, each presenting a different case from Ostrava and its surroundings. The main roles of the investigators were played by Petra Špalková, Jiří Vyorálek and Petr Panzenberger. The daughter of Petra Špalková's character was played by Anděla Tichá, the real daughter of the actress. On 22 March 2023 Czech Television announced the series was renewed for season 2. Season 2 premiere was scheduled to start broadcast on 8 January 2024 but was delayed following 2023 Prague shooting as one episode is dealing with a topic of school shooting. The start of broadcast for season 2 was eventually set for 8 April 2024.

== Cast ==
=== Main ===
- Petra Špalková as Magda Malá
- Jiří Vyorálek as Martin Černý
- Jaroslav Plesl as Pavel Malý
- Regina Rázlová as Karolína Malá
- Anděla Tichá as Amálka Malá
- Tomáš Mrvík as Filip Černý
- Miroslav Hanuš as Jan Hrbek
- Petr Panzenberger as Jarek Kucharčik
- David Viktora as Jiří Tomek
- Patrik Kříž as Radek
- Tomáš Havlínek as Jindřich Staněk
- Veronika Lapková as Jolana Gábová
- Ondřej Brett as analyst Milan
- Vít Roleček as analyst Jan
- Vladislav Georgiev as medical examiner Bláha
- Jakub Vaverka as Mustafa
- Marek Cisovský as mjr. Svatoš

== Episodes ==
=== Season 1 (2022) ===
| No. | Title | Directed by | Written by | Original release date | Czech viewers (millions) |
|---|---|---|---|---|---|
| 1 | "Klec" | Radim Špaček | Zdeněk Zapletal | January 3, 2022 | 1.684 |
| 2 | "Hlasy" | Radim Špaček | Zdeněk Zapletal | January 10, 2022 | 1.604 |
| 3 | "Tanečnice" | Radim Špaček | Zdeněk Zapletal | January 17, 2022 | 1.651 |
| 4 | "Prank" | Radim Špaček | Zdeněk Zapletal | January 24, 2022 | 1.661 |
| 5 | "Dubina" | Radim Špaček | Zdeněk Zapletal | January 31, 2022 | 1.583 |
| 6 | "Hardcore" | Radim Špaček | Zdeněk Zapletal | February 7, 2022 | 1.554 |
| 7 | "Dublér" | Radim Špaček | Zdeněk Zapletal | February 14, 2022 | 1.447 |
| 8 | "Revolver" | Radim Špaček | Zdeněk Zapletal | February 21, 2022 | 1.501 |
| 9 | "243" | Radim Špaček | Zdeněk Zapletal | February 28, 2022 | 1.344 |
| 10 | "Závod" | Radim Špaček | Zdeněk Zapletal | March 14, 2022 | 1.412 |
| 11 | "Doba" | Radim Špaček | Zdeněk Zapletal | March 21, 2022 | 1.358 |
| 12 | "Strach" | Radim Špaček | Zdeněk Zapletal | March 28, 2022 | 1.400 |

=== Season 2 (2024) ===
| No. overall | No. in series | Title | Directed by | Written by | Original release date | Czech viewers (millions) |
|---|---|---|---|---|---|---|
| 13 | 1 | "Královna majálesu" | Radim Špaček | Zdeněk Zapletal | April 8, 2024 | 1.085 |
| 14 | 2 | "Poslední naděje" | Radim Špaček | Zdeněk Zapletal | April 15, 2024 | 1.199 |
| 15 | 3 | "Snadné cíle" | Radim Špaček | Zdeněk Zapletal | April 22, 2024 | 1.148 |
| 16 | 4 | "Opravdová láska" | Radim Špaček | Zdeněk Zapletal | April 29, 2024 | 1.185 |
| 17 | 5 | "Zákony ulice" | Radim Špaček | Zdeněk Zapletal | May 6, 2024 | 1.193 |
| 18 | 6 | "Samá voda" | Radim Špaček | Zdeněk Zapletal | May 13, 2024 | 0.885 |
| 19 | 7 | "Čarovná noc" | Radim Špaček | Zdeněk Zapletal | May 20, 2024 | 1.147 |
| 20 | 8 | "Druhá tvář" | Radim Špaček | Zdeněk Zapletal | May 27, 2024 | 1.143 |
| 21 | 9 | "Číslo 2" | Radim Špaček | Zdeněk Zapletal | June 3, 2024 | 1.171 |
| 22 | 10 | "Ranní vrah" | Radim Špaček | Zdeněk Zapletal | June 10, 2024 | 1.106 |
| 23 | 11 | "Nečistá hra" | Radim Špaček | Zdeněk Zapletal | June 17, 2024 | 1.105 |
| 24 | 12 | "Poslední případ" | Radim Špaček | Zdeněk Zapletal | June 24, 2024 | 1.068 |
