= Hadar Galron =

British-Israeli playwright and screenwriter

Hader Galron הדר גלרון
- Born: Nurit Hadar; September 28, 1970 (age 56); London, United Kingdom

Hadar Galron (Hebrew: הדר גלרון; born Nurit Hadar; September 28, 1970) is an Anglo-Israeli playwright, screenwriter, comedian, director, actress and teacher of dramatic writing at several Academic Institutes.

== Biography ==
Galron was born and raised in London to a religious family under the name Nurit Hadar (after marriage she used her maiden name as her first name). When she was 13, she immigrated to Israel with her family and settled in Tel Aviv. During her formative years, she attended the Religious School "Zeitlin" in Tel Aviv. Following her studies, she enlisted in the Israel Defense Forces as a soldier-teacher and was recognized as an outstanding soldier for her contribution and far-reaching influence in the Kiryat Ekron Council, where she served. Galron finished her bachelor's degree in Community Theater Studies from Tel Aviv University's art faculty.

She is divorced and has three children.

=== Stand-up and satire ===
In the 1990s, she co-founded the comedy duo "Noya and Nurit" with Noya Mendel. Together, they hosted the stand-up show Kosher Comedy. Galron also created a solo provocative stand-up show, Pulsa De-Nurit, bringing up all the taboos on women's status in Judaism. Subsequently, she presented the show at the Cameri Theatre under the title Pulsa.

In 2012, she wrote and produced Passion Killer, with Aharon Feuerstein as co-writer, directed by Shmuel Vilozni. This satirical cabaret show portrays biblical women who played crucial roles in saving the Jewish Nation, from a modern perspective (Eve, Tamar, Esther, and Rahab). Galron has toured with the show in Israel, the US and Europe.

=== Theater ===
Galron penned the play Mikveh, which garnered six Israeli Theatre Award nominations and won two awards, including "Play of the Year" in 2005. Originally produced by Beit Lessin Theater, "Mikveh" was later staged in the Yiddishpeal (2014) and Habima National Theatre (2019) in Israel. It has been translated into multiple languages and successfully performed worldwide, including in the National theatres of Mexico and the Czech Republic, theatres in Hungary, Washington, Romania, and more. The play was also published in Hebrew as a book titled "Mikveh: a Woman's Place".

In 2008, Galron portrayed Michal, King Saul's daughter, in Natalie Naman's play "Why Did You Laugh" at the Tel Aviv Tzavta Theater.

In 2011, she created and directed "I LOVE MAMA", a play addressing the challenges of modern motherhood. It was directed by Galron with students at Beit Zvi and later performed in Tel-Aviv, the Haifa Theater. It was translated and produced in the MDP, city theatres of Prague (2018), where it won the title of "audiences choice", and in 2023 in the Municipal Theatre of Zvolen, Slovakia.

Galron undertook roles such as directing and editing for Yoram Gaon's musical theatre show "B'kol Hakavod"(with Respect), creating connecting pieces for the music shows "Kribo's Friends" and "The Faculty". In 2013 Galron wrote (in collaboration with journalist Amir Zohar) and directed the play "Musrara" about the Israeli Black Panthers in the 70's at Psik Theater in Jerusalem. The play ran until 2018. In 2017, she adapted the screenplay of the film "The Secrets" into a play titled "The Secrets" (Hasodot). The play premiered at Beit Lessin Theater to critical acclaim, and Galron herself directed The Secrets (Tajemstvi), in the Czech Republic in 2019. It was later performed at Beit Zvi in 2024. Additionally, in 2019, the play "Whistle – My Mother Was Mengele's Secretary" was staged, a monodrama featuring Galron and co-written with Jacob Buchan, whose mother served as Mengele's secretary at Auschwitz. The play won 3 awards at several International festivals, and has been hosted in theatres in Europe and the US, translated into 8 languages. It has been published as a book in Hebrew, English and German.

In 2022, Galron directed the play "OtherWise" (Pikuach Nefesh) at the Cameri Theatre, and wrote the play "400 Barrels of Wine" for Ariel Theatre in Philadelphia. In 2023, she debuted the play "So How Do You Want to Die?", a production centered on the October 7 terrorist attack in Munich.

=== Television and cinema ===
In 2018, her drama series "Harem" (based on a true story) aired on Channel 13, a production she co-wrote with Anat Barzilai and Gadi Taub, and she took on an acting role within it. "Harem" was sold to Amazon Prime and in since February 2024, it has been broadcast on Netflix.

In 2007, the film "The Secrets", written by Hadar Galron together with director of the film, Avi Nesher, was released. The film was critically acclaimed, nominated for 11 Israeli film academy awards. The screenplay was chosen to be archived in Hollywood and won several awards at International Film festivals.

The film "Bruriah", in which Galron played lead role and also co-wrote with director-producer Abraham Kushnir was released in 2008. It was an independent film, and travelled to many film festivals.

Galron has appeared in various television programs, including "The World According to Feuerstein", "Motzash Rishon", and "Relax with Sefi Rivlin". She hosted holiday programs, wrote and hosted the educational series "Young in Spirit", and contributed scripts to children's shows, among other TV projects.

In 2014, she made a guest appearance on the drama series Temporarily Dead. Additionally, in 2017, she played a role in the youth series "Rosh Gadol" on Yes Kidz channel.

=== Music ===
Galron wrote lyrics to most of the songs in DinDin Aviv's album "Free Between Worlds". She wrote children's songs for theatrical productions and TV shows, such as "Dad's Genius" with Yehoram Gaon, among others. She writes songs for her theatrical works and some of her poetry has been published.
