= Grand Prix (2022 film) =

- Directed by: Jan Prušinovský
- Written by: Jan Prušinovský
- Produced by: Jan Prušinovský; Ondřej Zima
- Starring: Kryštof Hádek; Robin Ferro; Štěpán Kozub
- Cinematography: David Hofmann
- Edited by: Lukáš Opatrný
- Music by: Ondřej Anděra
- Distributed by: Falcon
- Release date: 17 November 2022
- Running time: 107 minutes
- Country: Czech Republic
- Language: Czech
- Budget: 42 Million KČ

Grand Prix is a Czech film by director and screenwriter Jan Prušinovský. The film is a road movie and tells the story of two cousins who want to get into Formula 1 racing. One of them wins tickets to the Spanish Grand Prix and they embark on a journey across Europe, but their journey is not without complications.

The main roles were played by Kryštof Hádek, Robin Ferro and Štěpán Kozub, Anna Kameníková, Marek Daniel, Eva Hacurová, Miroslav Donutil and Tatiana Dyková appeared in other roles.

The creation of the film was financially supported by the Czech State Cinematography Fund and Slovak Audiovisual Fund. The film premiered in Czech cinemas on 17 November 2022.

== Plot ==
The dream of two cousins, Roman (Kryštof Hádek) and Emil (Robin Ferro), is to get to the Formula 1 races. Roman runs a dirty car dealership on the outskirts of the city, has three children and a wild wife (Anna Kameníková). Emil, a keen lover of order, runs his car workshop in the downtown and knows almost everything about cars.

When one day Emil wins tickets to the Spanish Grand Prix in Barcelona in a televised contest, little does either of them know that their dream trip will soon turn into a wild ride across Europe. Especially when Štětka (Štěpán Kozub), Roman's friend and a local magnet for trouble, turns on them.

== Cast ==
- Kryštof Hádek as Roman
- Robin Ferro as Emil
- Štěpán Kozub as Štětka
- Anna Kameníková as Iveta
- Marek Daniel as Holeček
- Miroslav Donutil as Štětka
- Eva Hacurová as Bílková
- Tatiana Dyková as Jindra
- Cyril Drozda as Šrejbr
- Michal Režný as Klimek
- Nikola Janković as Bogumil
- Clet Bourgois as the french drunk husband in the couch
