= Arvéd =

- Directed by: Vojtěch Mašek
- Written by: Vojtěch Mašek, Jan Poláček
- Produced by: Ivan Ostrochovský
- Starring: Michal Kern; Saša Rašilov
- Cinematography: Dušan Husár
- Music by: Aid Kid, Jonatán Pastirčák
- Production companies: Cinémotif Films; Punkchart films Česká televize
- Distributed by: CinemArt
- Release dates: 3 August 2022 (Uherské Hradiště Film School); 25 August 2022 (Czech Republic)
- Running time: 120 minutes
- Countries: Czech Republic; Slovakia
- Language: Czech
- Budget: 30 Million CZK

Arvéd is a 2022 Czech psychological mystery drama film directed by Vojtěch Mašek. It is loosely based on the life of Jiří "Arvéd" Smíchovský. The film has a Faustian theme, telling a story of how far a person can go to achieve their goal. The filmmakers wanted Smíchovský's character to confront two totalitarian regimes (Nazism and the Communist regime) as he collaborated with both during his life.

== Plot ==
The film is about Jiří Arvéd Smíchovský. Story of his life and death are still surrounded by many secrets. During the war, as a Nazi confidant, he saved Štěpán Plaček from a concentration camp. After the war, their roles are reversed and Plaček repays the debt. He arranges that the court does not demand death for Arvéd for collaborating with the Nazis, but only sentences him to life imprisonment. However, mutual services do not end there. As a state security investigator, Plaček uses Arvéd to convict inconvenient people. He rewards him for his services with the benefits of being a prominent prisoner and above all with Arvéd's greatest drug - rare occult books from confiscated libraries. Arvéd and Plaček are playing a game of chess. The game for Arvéd's soul enters the finale.

== Cast ==
- Michal Kern as Arvéd
- Saša Rašilov as Štěpán Plaček
- Martin Pechlát as Josef Šábe
- Jaroslav Plesl as Zenek
- Vojtěch Vodochodský as Vlastík
- Marián Labuda ml. as Franta
- Petr Čtvrtníček as Vilda
- Emanuel Fellmer as Bert Walden
- Ivana Uhlířová as Andulka
- Pavlína Štorková as Blanka
- Tomáš Kobr as František Kabelák
- Václav Rašilov as Felix de la Cámara
- Marek Dluhoš as Demon

== Production ==
The film received support of 11 million CZK from Czech Film State Fund. It is film debut of director Vojtěch Mašek. Shooting started in February 2022. Large portion of shooting took place in Prague-Kbely studios.

== Release ==
The film premiered at Uherské Hradiště Film School on 3 August 2022. It entered theatres on 25 August 2022.

== Reception ==
Arvéd received mixed to positive reviews. It holds 62% on Kinobox.cz.
