= Akkiraju Haragopal =

Indian politician (1958–2021)

- Born: 1958
- Died: 14 October 2021 (aged 62–63)

Akkiraju Haragopal (1958 – 14 October 2021), commonly known as Ramakrishna, alias R.K., was an Indian politician and Politbureau member of the Communist Party of India (Maoist). Haragopal had a reward of 97 lakh on his head at the time of his death.

== Career ==
Haragopal was born in 1958 at Tumrugoti village, Palnadu, Guntur district in the state of Andhra Pradesh. After graduation, he worked as a teacher and joined the Radical Students Union, a student wing of the erstwhile People's War Group, in 1978. He was active in the Guntur district as secretary of the Communist Party of India (Marxist–Leninist) People's War district committee in 1986. In 2001, he became a central committee member of the party. Haragopal was appointed as a Central Committee member of the CPI (Maoist) and in charge of the Andhra-Odisha Border Special Zonal Committee after the merger of the People's War and the Maoist Communist Centre. He headed the peace negotiation mission on behalf of the Maoists with the Andhra Pradesh government in 2004. In 2018, he was elevated to the Politbureau. After four decades of underground life, he died due to kidney failure on 14 October 2021 at the age of 63. Haragopal was one of the prime accused in the attack on Chandrababu Naidu, former Chief Minister of Andhra Pradesh. His wife, Sirisha, is also a former Maoist activist, and their son Munna was killed near Malkangiri in an encounter with police in October 2016.
