= The Last Race (2022 film) =

- Directed by: Tomáš Hodan
- Produced by: Ondřej Beránek
- Starring: Kryštof Hádek; Marek Adamczyk; Oldřich Kaiser; Judit Bárdos; Vladimír Pokorný; Vladimír Javorský
- Cinematography: Jan Baset Střítežský
- Distributed by: Bontonfilm
- Release date: 24 March 2022
- Running time: 102 minutes
- Country: Czech Republic
- Language: Czech
- Budget: 30,000,000 CZK
- Box office: 15,493,096 CZK

The Last Race (Czech: Poslední závod) is a 2022 Czech historical sport drama film directed by Tomáš Hodan. It tells story of Bohumil Hanč and Václav Vrbata who died during a 1913 race in Giant Mountains.

== Cast ==
- Kryštof Hádek as Bohumil Hanč
- Marek Adamczyk as Emerich Rath
  - Oldřich Kaiser as old Emerich Rath
- Judit Bárdos as Slavěna Hančová
- Vladimír Pokorný as Václav Vrbata
- Vladimír Javorský as Jan Buchar
- Jan Hájek
- Jaroslav Plesl as Josef Rössler-Ořovský
- Jan Nedbal as Josef Feistauer
- Cyril Dobrý as Karel Jarolímek
- Jan Hofman as Josef Scheiner
- Gabriela Pyšná
- Bastian Beyer as Oswald Bartel
- Zbyšek Humpolec
- Simon Kirschner as Ingvald Smith-Kielland
