= List of original shows by Czech Television =

The following is a list of original programs of Czech Television network.

== Series ==
- 4teens (2011)
- Ach, ty vraždy! (2010–2012)
- Adikts (2024)
- Bohéma (2017)
- Božena (2021)
- Boží mlýny (2011)
- Bylo nás šest (1994)
- Cirkus Bukowsky (2013–2014)
- Clona (2014)
- Cukrárna (2011)
- Čapkovy kapsy (2011)
- Černá sanitka (2008)
- Černí baroni (2004)
- České století (2013)
- Četnické humoresky (1997–2007)
- Četníci z Luhačovic (2017)
- Čtvrtá hvězda (2014)
- Dabing Street (2018)
- Děcko (Since 2025)
- Devadesátky (2022)
- Dobrá čtvrť (2005–2008)
- Dobré ráno, Brno! (Since 2023)
- Dobrodružství kriminalistiky (1989–1994)
- Docent (Since 2023)
- Doktor Martin (2015–2018)
- Ďáblova lest (2009)
- Ententýky (2012)
- Hec (TBA)
- Hlava Medúzy (2021)
- Hraběnky (2007)
- Inspektor Max (2018)
- Inženýrská odysea (1979–2006)
- Jak si nepodělat život (2019)
- Já, Mattoni (2016)
- Josef a Ly (2004)
- Kancl (2014)
- Kosmo (2016)
- Kriminálka Staré Město (2010–2013)
- Kukačky (Since 2021)
- Limity (Since 2025)
- Lovec (Since 2024)
- Lynč (2018)
- Maharal – Tajemství talismanu (2007)
- Marta a Věra (2014–2016)
- Mazalové (2014–2017)
- Místo zločinu České Budějovice (Since 2023)
- Místo zločinu Ostrava (2020)
- Místo zločinu Plzeň (2015)
- Místo zločinu Zlín (TBA)
- Modré stíny (2016)
- Most! (2019)
- Na cestě (Since 2006)
- Na tělo (TBA)
- Nádraží (2017)
- Náměstíčko (2004)
- Nemocnice na kraji města po dvaceti letech (2003–2004)
- Nemocnice na kraji města – nové osudy (2008)
- Neviditelní (2014)
- Nevinné lži (2013–2014)
- Ochránce (2021)
- Oktopus (Since 2023)
- Osada (Since 2021)
- Pět mrtvých psů (2016)
- Podezření (2022)
- Poldové a nemluvně (2020)
- Poste restante (2010)
- Pozadí událostí (2022)
- Proč bychom se netopili (2009)
- První republika (2014–2018)
- Případ pro exorcistu (2015)
- Případy 1. oddělení (2014–2022)
- Přítelkyně z domu smutku (1992)
- Ranč U Zelené sedmy (1998–2005)
- Rapl (2016–2019)
- Ratolesti (TBA)
- Reportérka (2015)
- Rédl (2018)
- Rudyho má každý rád (2015)
- Smysl pro tumor (2024)
- Saturnin (1994)
- Spravedlnost (2017)
- Stíny v mlze (Since 2022)
- Stockholmský syndrom (2020)
- Strážce duší (2003–2008)
- Strážmistr Topinka (2019)
- Svět pod hlavou (2017)
- Škola Na Výsluní (2006)
- Špunti na cestě (2022)
- Tajemství rodu (2013–2015)
- To se vysvětlí, soudruzi! (2024)
- Trapný padesátky (2017)
- Trpaslík (2016–2017)
- Tři králové (1998)
- Ultimátum (2022)
- Území bílých králů (1991)
- Vedlejší produkt (2024)
- Vlastně se nic nestalo (Since 2024)
- Volha (2023)
- Vyprávěj (2009–2013)
- Vzteklina (2018)
- Zdivočelá země (1997–2012)
- Zločin na dobré cestě (TBA)
- Zločiny Velké Prahy (2021)
- Znamení koně (2011–2015)
- Zrádci (2020)
- Ztracená brána (2012)
- Živé terče (2019)
- Život a doba soudce A. K. (2014–2017)

=== Animated/Children series ===
- Ahoj, bráško! (1991–1996)
- Anča a Pepík (2017–2022)
- Balabánci (1993)
- Bambulka a Bazilínek (1994)
- Béďa rošťák (1994)
- Běla a malý čaroděj (1996)
- Bráškové (2003)
- Broučci (1995–2000)
- Bubáci a hastrmani (1999–2005)
- Bugo a Pikola (1998)
- Cesty formana Šejtročka (1993–1994)
- Chaloupka na vršku (2008–2022)
- České pexeso (2011)
- Čtyřlístek (2024)
- Dějiny udatného českého národa (2010–2012)
- Dobré chutnání, Vaše lordstvo (1996)
- Dobrodružství pod vrbami (1999)
- Doktor Animo (2006–2010)
- Dva ve fraku (1995)
- Elin supertajný deník (Since 2024)
- Evropské pexeso (2008)
- Gorilí povídání (2015)
- Hravě to zvládneme! (Since 2024)
- Hurvínek vzduchoplavcem (1997)
- Jak Ťuk a Bzuk nechtěli, aby pršelo (1994)
- Kdopak by se čertů bál (Since 2021)
- Klok, Kloček a pes Dingo (1995)
- Kočka Linda, poklad rodiny (2011)
- Kocour Mour poznává své příbuzné (2014)
- Kriminálka 5. C (2019)
- Kluci ze zámku (2000)
- Království květin (1993)
- Krysáci (2008–2009)
- Lískulka (1998)
- Madla a Ťap (2006)
- Méďové (2001–2003)
- Méďové na cestách (2014)
- Můj dědeček zálesák (Since 2024)
- Nils a divoké husy (1998)
- O Kanafáskovi (2004)
- O raráši Mlíkovi (1999)
- O skřítku Racochejlovi (1997–2000)
- O ztrácené lásce (2002)
- Pat a Mat (Since 1992)
- Pohádky pro štěňátka (2011)
- Pruhovaní kamarádi (1998)
- Podivuhodná cesta ježka Aladina (2009)
- Pohádky pro štěňátka (2010)
- Putování za švestkovou vůní (1998–1999)
- Štuclinka a Zachumlánek (1999)
- Toronto Tom, kocour z Ameriky (1999)
- Tuláček (1997)
- Viky – sůva z nudlí (Since 2024)
- Vydrýsek (2003)
- Zahrádka pod hvězdami (Since 2017)
- Ze života rodiny Horáčkovy (1995)
- Z deníku žáka III.B aneb Edudant a Francimor (1993–2003)
- Žížaláci (Since 2009)

=== Documentary series ===
- Africká abeceda
- Bačování
- Čtyři v tom
- Jak na internet
- Manželské etudy
- Manželské etudy po dvaceti letech
- Manželské etudy po 35 letech
- Manželské etudy: Nová generace
- Modrá krev
- Šumná města

== Quiz shows ==
- AZ-kvíz

== Award shows ==
- Český Lev
- Peče celá země
- Věříš si?
- StarDance

== News ==
- Branky, body, vteřiny
- Události

== Reality shows ==
- Holiday in the Protectorate

== Hobby-related shows ==
- Auto Moto Revue
- Auto Moto Styl
- Kluci v akci

== Publicistic shows ==
- 13. komnata
- 168 hodin
- Černé ovce
- Experiment
- Fokus Václava Moravce
- Kalendárium
- Reportéři ČT
- Toulavá kamera

== Comedial shows ==
- 3 plus 1 s Miroslavem Donutilem (2004-2010)
- Česká soda (1993–1997)
- Pečený sněhulák (2014)
- Tak neváhej a toč! (1995–2007)
- Televarieté (1971–1998)

== Talk show ==
- Banánové rybičky
- Otázky Václava Moravce
- Všechnopárty

== Other shows ==
- Největší Čech
