= 2020 Czech Lion Awards =

Czech film and TV award ceremony

28th Czech Lion Awards
- Date: 6 March 2021
- Hosted by: Václav Kopta

Highlights
- Best Picture: Charlatan
- Best Actor: Ivan Trojan; Charlatan
- Best Actress: Magdaléna Borová; Shadow Country
- Best Supporting Actor: Jiří Mádl; Droneman
- Best Supporting Actress: Petra Špalková; Shadow Country
- Most awards: Shadow Country (6)
- Most nominations: Shadow Country (15)

Television coverage
- Network: Česká televize

2020 Czech Lion Awards ceremony will be held in March 2021. Awards underwent changes as new Categories were added. Animated film and Web works will be newly Awarded in their respective Categories. Some categories became open for Television and Web works as a result of increase in Television work quality.

Václav Kopta was announced to host ceremony scheduled for 6 March 2021. Nominations were announced on 18 January 2021. Shadow Country was nominated in 15 categories while Charlatan and Havel in 14 categories. Charlatan was awarded the Best film award while Shadow Country received most wins.

== Categories ==
New Categories include Best animated film and Best Short film. Nominations were announced on 18 January 2021.

Best Film	Best Director
Charlatan; Cook F**k Kill; Droneman; Havel; Shadow Country	Charlatan – Agnieszka Holland; Cook F**k Kill – Mira Fornay; Droneman – Petr Zelenka; Havel – Slávek Horák; Shadow Country – Bohdan Sláma
Best Actor in a Leading Role	Best Actress in a Leading Role
Charlatan – Ivan Trojan; Havel – Viktor Dvořák; Actor – Jan Cina; Shadow Country – Csongor Kassai; Droneman – Kryštof Hádek	Shadow Country – Magdaléna Borová; Cakes – Jana Plodková; Havel – Anna Geislerová; Actor – Jenovéfa Boková; Caught in the Net – Tereza Těžká
Best Actor in a Supporting Role	Best Actress in a Supporting Role
Droneman – Jiří Mádl; Havel – Martin Hofmann; Shadow Country – Stanislav Majer; Charlatan – Juraj Loj; Charlatan – Josef Trojan	Shadow Country – Petra Špalková; Havel – Barbora Seidlová; Actor – Elizaveta Maximová; Shadow Country – Barbora Poláková; Charlatan – Jaroslava Pokorná
Best Screenplay	Best Editing
Shadow Country – Ivan Arsenjev; Havel – Slávek Horák and Rudolf Suchánek; Actor – Petr Bok and Pavel Gotthard; Droneman – Petr Zelenka; Charlatan – Marek Epstein	Shadow Country – Jan Daňhel; Havel – Vladimír Barák; Actor – Marek Kráľovský; Droneman – Vladimír Barák; Charlatan – Pavel Hrdlička
Best Cinematography	Stage Design
Charlatan – Martin Štrba; Havel – Jan Šťastný; Actor – Martin Žiaran; Shadow Country – Diviš Marek; Droneman – Alexander Šurkala	Maria Theresa - A Woman at War – Martin Kurel; The Impossible Voyage – Noro Držiak, Milan Ondruch, Martin Máj, Jan Kolegar; Havel – Vladimír Hruška; Charlatan – Milan Býček; Shadow Country – Jan Pjena Novotný
Makeup and Hairstyling	Costume Design
Havel – Adriana Bartošová, René Stejskal; Bourák – Jana Bílková; Shadow Country – Lukáš Král; Maria Theresa - A Woman at War – Barbara Kichi; Charlatan – René Stejskal, Gabriela Poláková	Shadow Country – Zuzana Bambušek Krejzková; Bourák – Tereza Kučerová; Havel – Natálie Steklová; Maria Theresa - A Woman at War – Ján Kocman; Charlatan – Katarína Štrbová Bieliková
Music	Sound
Shadow Country – Jakub Kudláč; Bourák – Roman Holý; Havel – Petr Malásek; Charlatan – Antoni Komasa-Łazarkiewicz; Rats – Petr Ostrouchov	Charlatan – Radim Hladík jr.; Bourák – Jiří Klenka; FREM – Dominik Dolejší; Havel – Viktor Prášil, Pavel Rejholec; Shadow Country – Marek Poledna
Extraordinary audiovisual achievement	Best Documentary
#martyisdead; Project Film Naživo a Televize Naživo; Film Museum NaFilm	Caught in the Net; Alchemical Furnace; Kdo jinému jámu – Rudolf Slánský; Můj otec Antonín Kratochvíl; Two Roads
Best Animated Film	Best Short Film
A Colourful Dream; Love Is Just a Death Away; Hungry Bear Tales	Anatomy of a Czech Afternoon; Frontier; Pripyat Piano
Best Television Film or Miniseries	Best TV Series
Actor; Stockholm Syndrome; Veterán	Rats; Místo zločinu Ostrava; Specialisté
Unique Contribution to Czech Film
Hynek Bočan

=== Non-statutory Awards ===
Best Film Poster	Film Fans Award
Shadow Country	Caught in the Net
Magnesie Award for Best Student Film
Anatomy of a Czech Afternoon
