= Sumna =

Sumna may refer to places:

- Șumna, a commune in Moldova
- Šumná, a municipality and village in the South Moravian Region, Czech Republic
- Šumná, a part of Klášterec nad Ohří in the Ústí nad Labem Region, Czech Republic
- Šumná, a part of Litvínov in the Ústí nad Labem Region, Czech Republic
- Şumna, a variant name of the city of Shumen, Bulgaria

== See also ==
- Šumná města, Czech documentary series
