= Czech Lion Award for Best Television Film or Miniseries =

Czech media award

- Country: Czech Republic
- First award: 2015
- Currently held by: Mathematics of Crime
- Website: https://www.filmovaakademie.cz

Czech Lion Award for Best Television Film or Miniseries is one of the awards given to the best Czech television film or miniseries. Category was founded in 2015.

In 2024 the category was merged with Best Television Series award into a new category Czech Lion Award for Best TV Series or Miniseries.

== Winners ==
Year	English Name	Original Name	Director	Type	Original network
2015	The American Letters	Americké dopisy	Jaroslav Brabec	Film	Czech Television
2016	Murder in Polná	Vražda v polné	Viktor Polesný	Film	Czech Television
2017	Justice	Spravedlnost	Peter Bebjak	Miniseries	Czech Television
2018	Dukla 61	Dukla 61	David Ondříček	Film	Czech Television
2019	Monsters of the Shore	Vodník	Viktor Tauš	Miniseries	Czech Television
2020	Actor	Herec	Peter Bebjak	Miniseries	Czech Television
2021	Božena	Božena	Lenka Wimmerová	Miniseries	Czech Television
2022	Suspicion	Podezření	Michal Blaško	Miniseries	Czech Television
2023	Mathematics of Crime	Matematika zločinu	Peter Bebjak	Miniseries	TV Nova
