= Klára Melíšková =

Czech actress

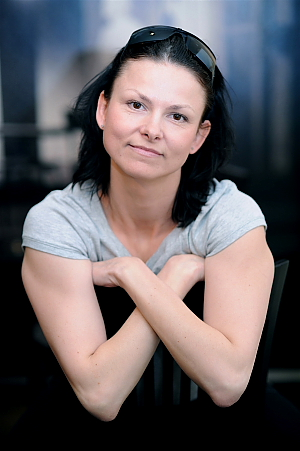
- Klára Melíšková
- Born: 29 November 1971 (age 54); Kladno, Czechoslovakia
- Occupation: Actress
- Years active: 1996–present
- Spouse: Lukáš Hlavica
- Children: 2

Klára Melíšková (born 29 November 1971, in Kladno) is a Czech stage and film actress. She is married to the actor Lukáš Hlavica, daughter-in-law of actor and painter Miloš Hlavica and actress Růžena Merunková and sister-in-law Anna Bendová.

She studied an acting in alternative and muppets' theatre Theatre Academy of music Arts in 1999.

== Theatre ==
=== Dejvické divadlo, Prague ===
- Anatomie gagu (1996)
- Lysistrate (1996) .... Lysistrate (Aristophanes)
- Twelfe months (1996) .... Holena (Oldřich Kryštofek)
- Kennedyho děti (1996) .... Rona (Robert Patrick)
- The Green Bird (1997) .... Tartagliona / Old Sogomora (Carlo Gozzi)
- Utišující metoda (1997) .... Central (Edgar Allan Poe)
- Pazour (1998) .... Angie (Howard Barker)
- Twelfth Nights (1999) .... Viola (William Shakespeare)
- O zaklatém hadovi (2001) .... Baba Jaga
- Tales of Insanity Stories (2001) .... Jana
- The Brothers Karamazow (2002) .... Kateřina
- Three Sisters (2002) .... Olga (Anton Pavlovich Chekhov)
- Sirup (play) (2002) .... Mrs. Knoblochová (Miroslav Krobot)
- The Magic Flute (2003) .... second boy, third lady (Wolfgang Amadeus Mozart)
- SEKEC MAZEC (2004)
- KFT/sendviče reality@ (2005) .... Carolyn (Karel František Tománek)
- The Idiot (play) (2008) .... Nastasja Filipovna (Fjodor Michajlovich Dostojevskij, Miroslav Krobot)
- Teremin (play) (2008) .... Kateřina (Petr Zelenka)
- Dračí doupe (2008) .... Homeless Woman (Viliam Klimáček)
- Hlasy (2009) .... Marie (David Jařab)
- The Man Without a Past (2010) .... Mrs. Nieminen (Aki Kaurismäki)
- Černá díra (2010) .... gas station attendant (Doyle Doubt)
- Krajina se zbraní (2010) .... Mrs. Ross (Joe Penhall)
- Spříznění volbou (2010) .... baronessa (Johann Wolfgang Goethe)
- Wanted Welzl (2011) ... Jane (Karel František Tománek)
- Ucpanej systém (2012) .... Katriona (Irvine Walsh)

== Filmography ==
- 1998 Minulost .... Girl
- 2003 Tajemný svícen (TV)
- 2004 Mistři .... Zdena
- 2007 Kolotoč (TV)
- 2007 Hodina klavíru (TV) .... Johanka
- 2008 BrainStorm (TV) .... Mrs. Jeklová
- 2009 Protektor .... Věra
- 2009 Nespavost TV)
- 2010 Zázraky života (TV)
- 2011 Terapie (TV series) .... Alice Poštová
- 2011 Čapkovy kapsy (TV series)
- 2011 Alois Nebel .... Nurse
- 2012 Čtyři slunce .... Eva
- 2014 Andělé všedního dne
- 2014 Život a doba soudce A. K. (TV series)
- 2014 Díra u Hanušovic
- 2015 Laputa
- 2015 Případ pro exorcistu (TV miniseries)
- 2016 Modré stíny (TV miniseries)
- 2016 I, Olga Hepnarová .... Olga's mother
- 2016 Pět mrtvých psů
- 2016 Tiger Theory
- 2017 Dabing Street (TV series)
- 2017 Trapný padesátky (TV series)
- 2017 Mordparta (TV series)
- 2017 Zahradnictví trilogy
- 2019 Zkáza Dejvického divadla .... self
- 2019 Terapie.... Alice Poštová
- 2019 Owners.... Mrs. Roubícková
- 2022 Suspicion (TV series) .... nurse Hana Kučerová

== Awards ==
- 2004 Czech Lion for Best Supporting Actress – film Mistři
- 2012 Czech Lion for Best Supporting Actress – film Čtyři slunce
- 2016 Czech Lion for Best Supporting Actress – film I, Olga Hepnarová
- 2019 Czech Lion for Best Supporting Actress – film Owners
- 2022 Czech Lion for Best Actress in Leading Role – television series Suspicion
