= Bulhac =

Bulhac may refer to several places in Moldova:

- Bulhac, a village in Șumna Commune, Rîșcani District
- Bulhac, a village in Cioropcani Commune, Ungheni District
