= Jiří Bartoška =

Czech actor (1947–2025)

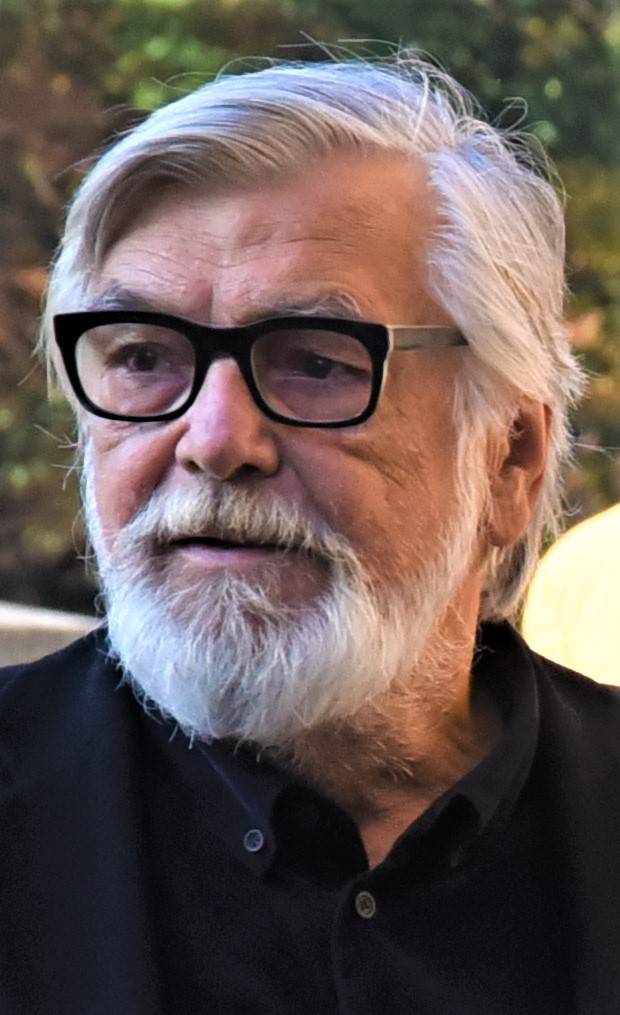
- Bartoška in 2019
- Born: 24 March 1947; Děčín, Czechoslovakia
- Died: 8 May 2025 (aged 78); Czech Republic
- Education: JAMU
- Occupation: Actor
- Years active: 1971–2025
- Spouse: Andrea Bartošková (m. 1976)
- Children: 2

Signature
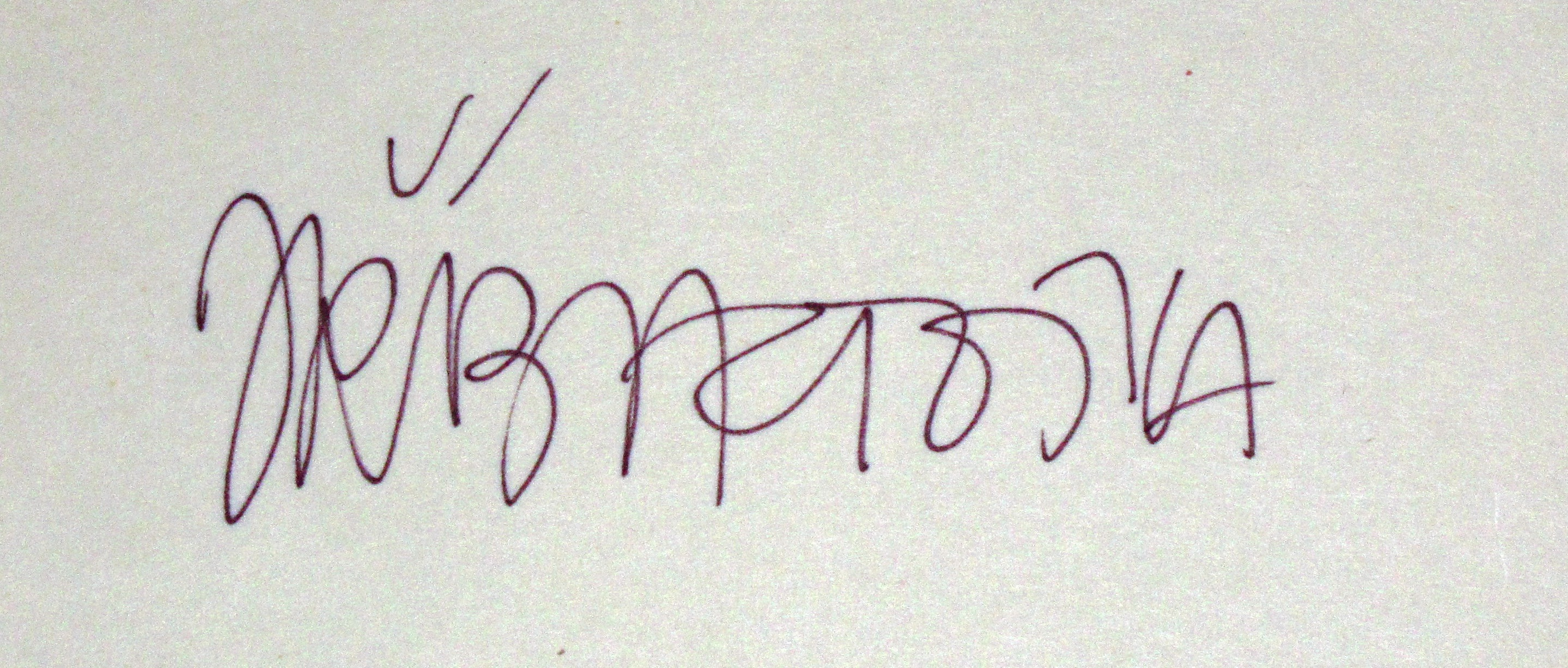

Jiří Bartoška (24 March 1947 – 8 May 2025) was a Czech theatre, television, and film actor and president of the Karlovy Vary International Film Festival. His most notable film roles include performances in Sekal Has to Die (1998), All My Loved Ones (1999), and Tiger Theory (2016), as well as the television series Sanitka (1984) and Neviditelní (2014).

== Life and career ==
Bartoška was born in Děčín, Czechoslovakia (now the Czech Republic) and went to high school in Pardubice. After graduating, he attended the Janáček Academy of Music and Performing Arts in Brno. He joined the Divadlo Husa na provázku theatre in Brno and in 1973, moved to northern Czechoslovakia to the Činoherní studio Ústí nad Labem theatre, where he stayed until 1978. At this point, the actor moved to Prague, where he began a residency at the Theatre on the Balustrade. In 1991, together with a number of colleagues, Bartoška transferred to the newly established Divadlo Bez zábradlí theatre. He was also a successful film and television actor, and lent his voice to a number of documentary films.

Beginning in 1994, Bartoška was president of the Karlovy Vary International Film Festival, where he collaborated mainly with film critic and journalist Eva Zaoralová.

In 2000, he won a Czech Lion for Best Supporting Actor for his performance in All My Loved Ones. He had been nominated for the same award the previous year for his performance in Sekal Has to Die, though he didn't win.

Bartoška died on 8 May 2025, at the age of 78.

=== Political activity ===
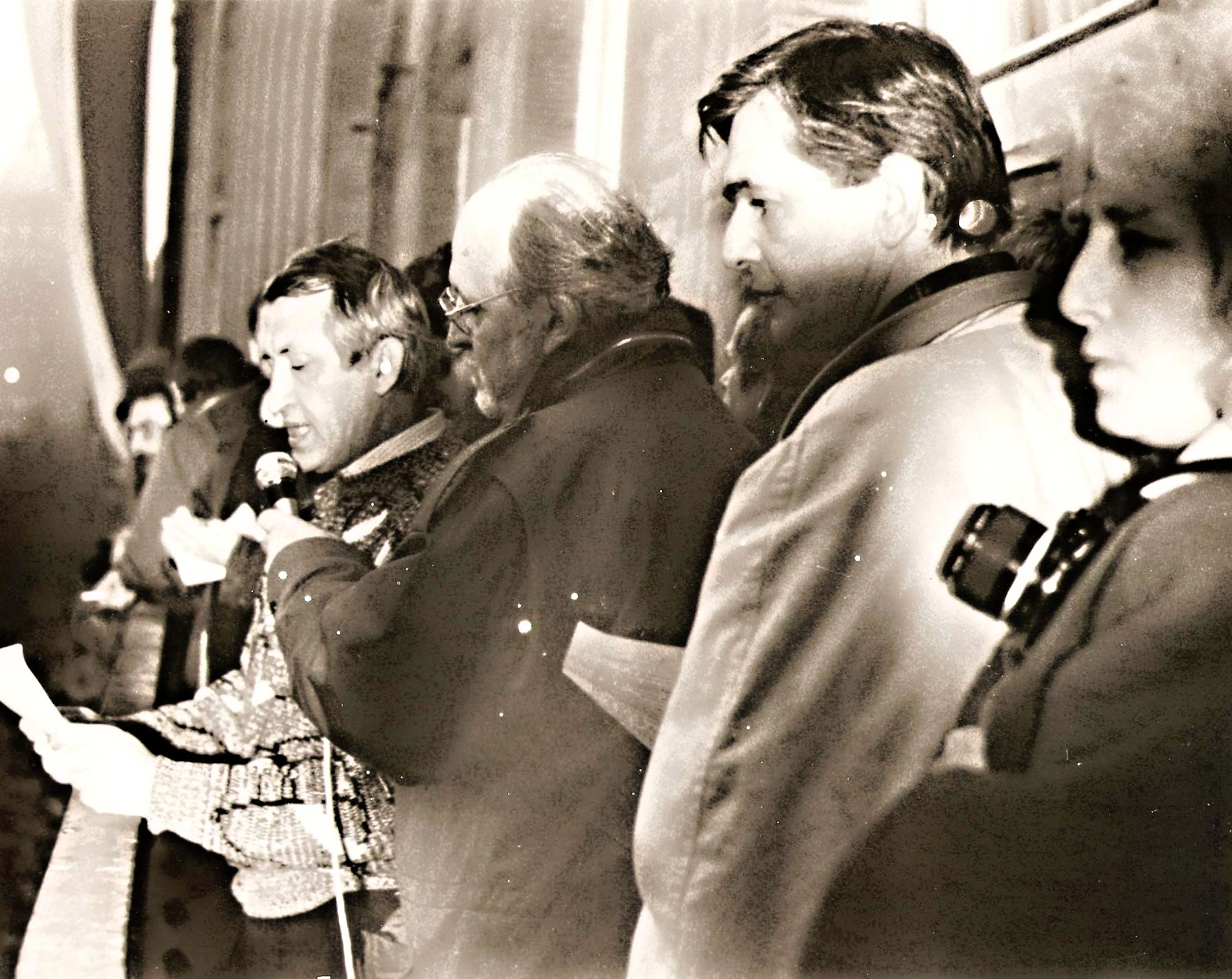
Bartoška (second from right) on the balcony of the Melantrich building on Wenceslas Square during the Velvet Revolution in November 1989

During the Communist era in Czechoslovakia, Bartoška was a signatory of the 1977 Anticharter, in opposition to the Charter 77 civic initiative co-written by dissident and playwright Václav Havel. In 1989, in a seeming about-face, Bartoška signed Několik vět, a document put forward by Charter 77; he also joined a petition for Havel's release from prison. The same year, he co-founded the Civic Forum political movement with Havel. At a demonstration on 10 December 1989, he announced his candidacy for president of the Czechoslovak Socialist Republic.

In 2016, responding to a number of statements made by president Miloš Zeman, as well as the Prohlášení čtyř document, which criticized the meeting between then-culture minister Daniel Herman and the Dalai Lama, Bartoška and Vojtěch Dyk incited the Czech public to civil unrest.

== Selected filmography ==
=== Film ===
List of film appearances, with year, title, and role shown
| Year | Title | Role | Notes |
|---|---|---|---|
| 1998 | Sekal Has to Die | Father Flora | |
| 1999 | All My Loved Ones | Samuel | |
| 2005 | Wrong Side Up | Jiří | |
| 2005 | Angel of the Lord | God | |
| 2009 | You Kiss like a God | Karel | |
| 2011 | Leaving | Police officer | |
| 2012 | Líbáš jako ďábel | Karel | |
| 2016 | Tiger Theory | Jan | |
| 2016 | Angel of the Lord 2 | God | |
| 2020 | Havel | Jan Patočka | |

=== Television ===
List of television appearances, with year, title, and role shown
| Year | Title | Role | Notes |
|---|---|---|---|
| 1984 | Sanitka | Richard Skalka | 10 episodes |
| 1986 | Panoptikum města pražského | Secretary | 1 episode |
| 1988 | Cirkus Humberto | Bureš | 6 episodes |
| 2006–08 | On the Road | | Voice |
| 2008 | Dobrá čtvrť | Martin Palouš | 10 episodes |
| 2014 | Neviditelní | Hubert Vydra | 12 episodes |
| 2014 | Princess and the Scribe | King | Television movie |
| 2016–18 | Za sklom | Vladimír Slančík | 13 episodes |
