= Terapie =

Czech television series

- Genre: Drama
- Created by: Petr Zelenka; Marek Najbrt; Robert Geisler; Benjamin Tuček; Iva Klestilová
- Directed by: Petr Zelenka; Marek Najbrt; Jaroslav Fuit
- Starring: Karel Roden; Klára Melíšková; Táňa Pauhofová; Lukáš Hejlík; Michaela Doubravová; Anna Geislerová; Martin Hofmann; Kamila Magálová; Berenika Kohoutová; Jan Cina; Kristýna Frejová; Tomáš Matonoha; Jiří Štěpnička
- Country of origin: Czech Republic
- Original languages: Czech; Slovak
- No. of seasons: 3
- No. of episodes: 116

Production
- Cinematography: Alexander Šurkala
- Running time: 30 minutes

Original release
- Network: HBO Europe
- Release: 21 September 2011 – 4 March 2019

Terapie (2011) is a Czech television series produced by HBO. Series format is taken from an Israeli series BeTipul (2005), from which came the American series In Treatment (2008).

Terapie is the first series of HBO Czech, which uses the format taken from abroad.

The series began filming on 27 September 2010 Barrandov studios. The last shooting day was scheduled for 17 February 2011, filming finally ended 19 February. Overall, the filming took 95 shooting days. The main role of a psychotherapist played by Karel Roden.

== Cast ==
- Karel Roden .... Dr. Marek Pošta
- Klára Melíšková .... Alice Poštová
- Berenika Kohoutová .... Klára Poštová
- Tatiana Pauhofová .... Sandra
- Lukáš Hejlík .... Igor Heřman
- Michaela Doubravová .... Linda
- Anna Geislerová .... Jana
- Martin Hofmann .... Michal
- Kamila Magálová .... Dita
- Tomáš Matonoha .... Linda's father
- Kristýna Frejová .... Linda's mother
- Jiří Štěpnička .... Igor's father
