= Czech Lion Award for Best TV Series =

Czech media award

- Country: Czech Republic
- First award: 2015
- Currently held by: Volga
- Website: https://www.filmovaakademie.cz

Czech Lion Award for Best TV Series is one of the awards given to the best Czech television series. Category was founded in 2015.

In 2024 the category was merged with Best Television Film or Miniseries award into a new category Czech Lion Award for Best TV Series or Miniseries.

== Winners ==
Year	English Name	Original Name	Director	Original network
2015	Mamon	Mamon	Vladimír Michálek	HBO Europe
2016	Wasteland	Pustina	Alice Nellis, Ivan Zachariáš	HBO Europe
2017	World under your head	Svět pod hlavou	Marek Najbrt, Radim Špaček	Czech Television; TV JOJ
2018	Dabing Street	Dabing Street	Petr Zelenka	Czech Television
2019	MOST!	MOST!	Jan Prušinovský	Czech Television
2020	Rats	Zrádci	Viktor Tauš	Czech Television
2021	The Defender	Ochránce	Tereza Kopáčová, Tomáš Mašín	Czech Television
2022	Nineties	Devadesátky	Peter Bebjak	Czech Television
2023	Volga	Volha	Jan Pachl	Czech Television
