= Barbora Seidlová =

Czech actress (born 1981)

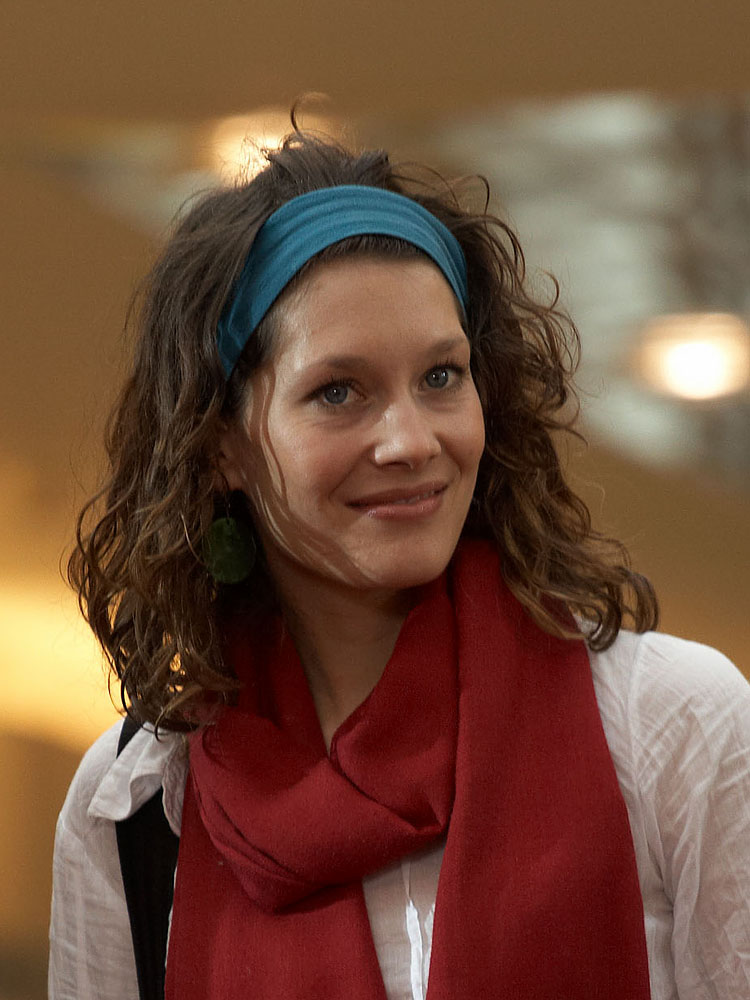
- Born: 23 May 1981 (age 44); Valtice, Czechoslovakia
- Occupation: Actress
- Years active: 1997–present

Barbora Seidlová (born 23 May 1981) is a Czech actress.

== Life and career ==
Born in Valtice, Seidlová studied at the Brno Conservatory and at the DAMU department of the Academy of Performing Arts in Prague. Her career was launched by director Karel Smyczek, who gave Seidlová her first role in the television film Romeo, Julie a tma and then chose her for the main role in the film Lotrando a Zubejda. For her performance in Havel, she was nominated for best supporting actress at the Czech Lion Awards.

== Selected filmography ==
- Lotrando a Zubejda (1997)
- 24 (2001)
- Snowboarďáci (2004)
- An Earthly Paradise for the Eyes (2009)
- Kovář z Podlesí (2013)
- Havel (2020)
