= Snowboarďáci =

2004 Czech comedy film

- Directed by: Karel Janák
- Screenplay by: Karel Janák
- Produced by: Pavel Melounek, Jiří Sirotek, Magdalena Sedláková, Jan Nejedlý
- Starring: Jiří Mádl, Vojtěch Kotek
- Cinematography: Martin Šácha
- Edited by: Adam Dvořák
- Music by: Miroslav Chyška
- Distributed by: Falcon
- Release date: 4 November 2004
- Running time: 99 Minutes
- Country: Czech Republic
- Language: Czech
- Box office: 65,471,238 CZK

Snowboarďáci (lit. 'The Snowboarders') is a Czech comedy film directed by Karel Janák. It was released in 2004.

== Cast and characters ==
- Vojtěch Kotek as Rendy
- Jiří Mádl as Jáchym
- Ester Geislerová as Marta
- Barbora Seidlová as Tereza
- Lucie Vondráčková as Klára
- Martina Klírová as Lucie
- Jiří Langmajer as Milan
