= Norbert Lichý =

Czech actor (1964–2024)

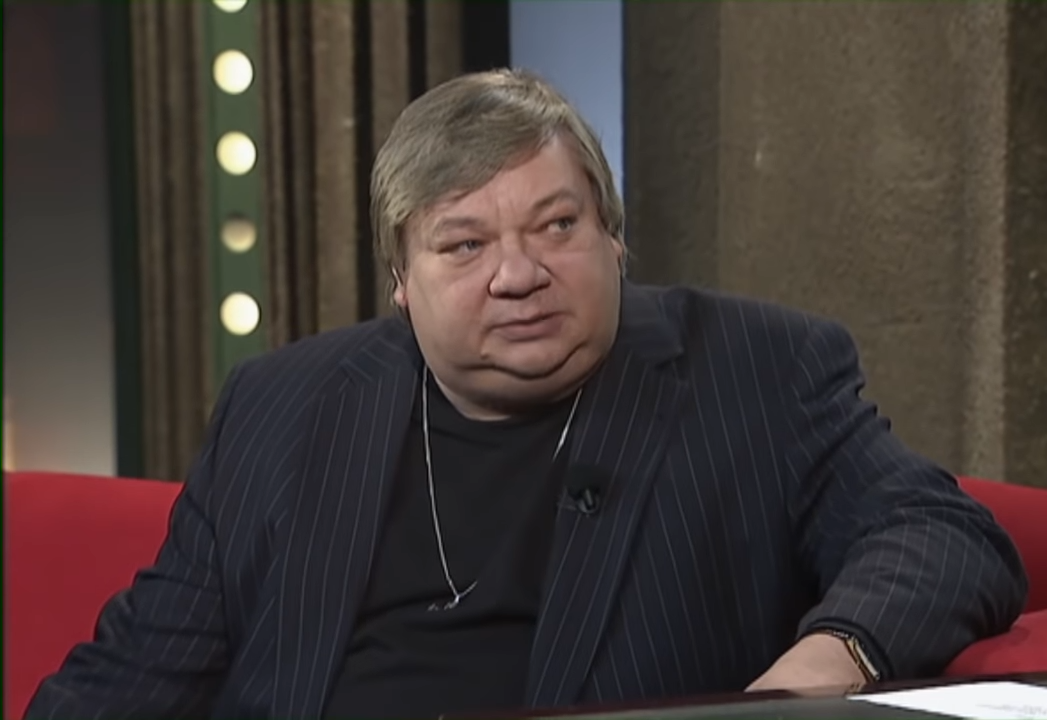
- Lichý in 2013
- Born: 29 December 1964; Ostrava, Czechoslovakia
- Died: 16 January 2024 (aged 59); Ostrava, Czech Republic
- Occupations: Actor, voice actor

Norbert Lichý (29 December 1964 – 16 January 2024) was a Czech actor and voice actor. He was employed for more than 35 years in the Petr Bezruč Theatre in Ostrava. He was known for his distinctive voice and corpulent figure.

== Life and career ==
Norbert Lichý was born on 29 December 1964 in Ostrava. His father, Alexander "Saša" Lichý, was a dramatist, director of theatre plays, actor, and co-founder and director of the Petr Bezruč Theatre in Ostrava. His mother, Evelyn, was a dancer in this theatre. As a child, Norbert appeared as an actor at the Petr Bezruč Theatre. After graduating from high school, he was not accepted to study acting at the Janáček Academy of Performing Arts. In 1984, he began working at the North Moravian Theatre in Šumperk. In 1986–1987, he was employed at the Puppet Theatre in Ostrava. From 1987, he was employed in the Petr Bezruč Theatre. He worked there until his death.

Lichý was known for his distinctive voice and corpulent figure. From the beginning of his career, he portrayed characters older than himself. His notable theatre roles included Karel Kopfrkingl in an adaptation of Ladislav Fuks' The Cremator, Truffaldino in The Servant of Two Masters, Rogozhin in an adaptation of The Idiot, and Harpagon in The Miser. He was primarily a theatre actor, but he often appeared in smaller film and television roles. He also did voice acting and collaborated with Czech Television and Czech Radio.

Lichý lived his entire life in Ostrava and considered himself an Ostrava patriot. He lived with his mother, never married, and had no children. He died on 16 January 2024 at home of heart failure.

== Selected filmography ==
- Comeback (TV series; 2008)
- Changes (2009)
- Lidice (2011)
- Seven Days of Sin (2012)
- Cirkus Bukowsky (TV series; 2013–2014)
- Princess and the Scribe (2014)
- Doktor Martin (TV series; 2015–2016)
- Přístav (TV series; 2015–2017)
- A Vote for the King of the Romans (2016)
- Lajna (TV series; 2017–2021)
- Hastrman (2018)
- Dvojka na zabití (TV series; 2021)
- To se vysvětlí, soudruzi! (TV series; 2024)

== Honours ==
Lichý won the 2008 Thalia Award for his role as Mendel Singer in Joseph Roth's play Job, based on the novel Job.

For his reading of the novel Papillon, he won the 2016 "Neviditelný herec" ('invisible actor') award for performance in radio broadcasting.
