= 24 (2001 film) =

2001 film by David Beránek

- Directed by: David Beránek
- Written by: Jana Doležalová
- Produced by: Jana Bartoňová; Adolf Zika
- Cinematography: Jan Bartoň
- Edited by: David Beránek
- Music by: David Rotter
- Release date: 11 January 2001
- Running time: 78 minutes
- Country: Czech Republic
- Language: Czech

24 is a 2001 Czech thriller film directed by David Beránek, starring Barbora Seidlová and Martin Trnavský. The story is structured around a 24 hour-period, and follows a man and a woman on the run on the Czech countryside. The film was released by Bontonfilm on 11 January 2001.

== Cast ==
- Pavel Trnavský as Martin
- Barbora Seidlová as dívka
- Jiří Tomek as grandfather
