= Miroslav Hanuš =

Czech actor

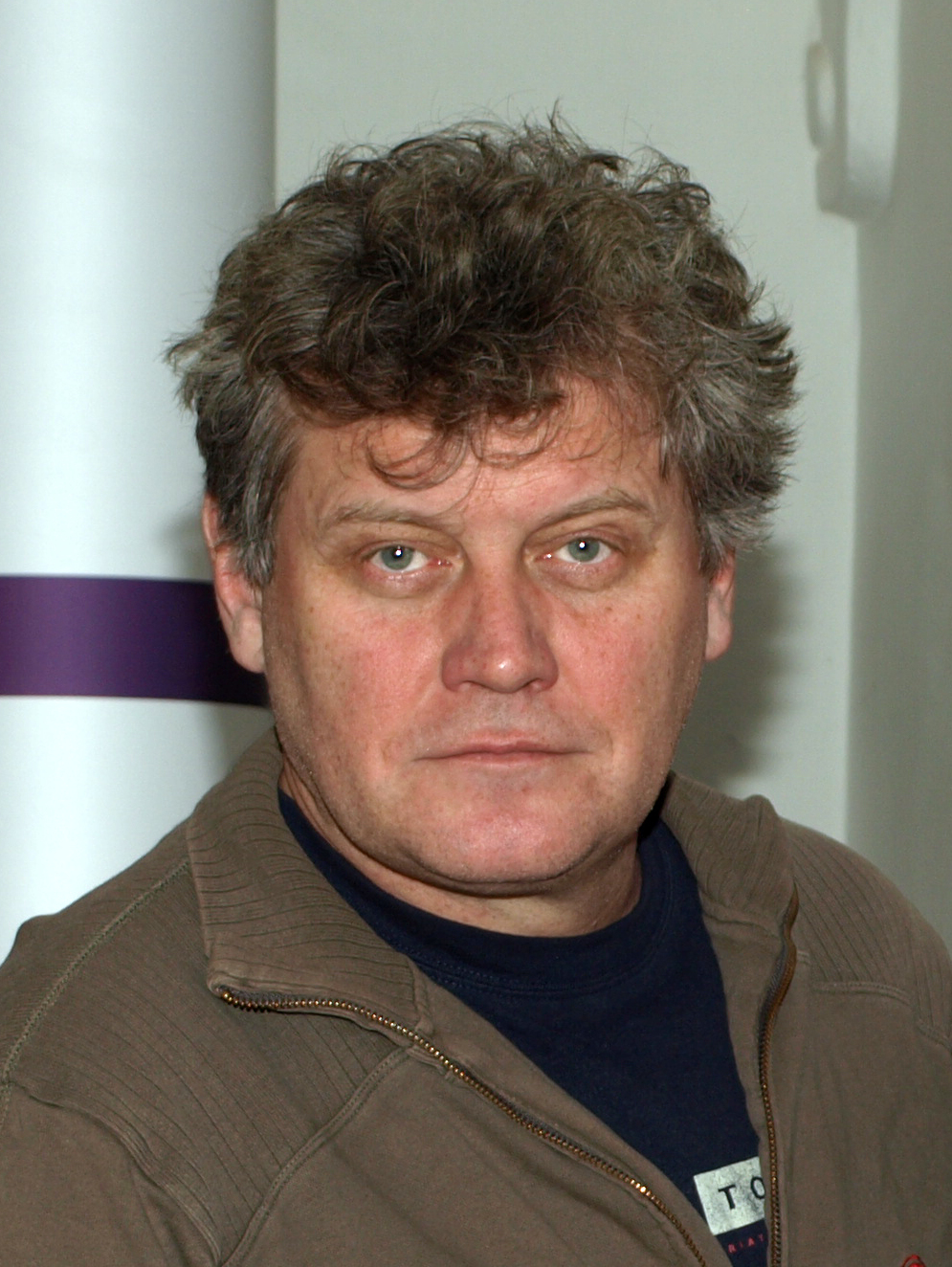
- Hanuš in 2013
- Born: 22 May 1963 (age 62); Prague, Czechoslovakia
- Occupation: Actor
- Years active: 1983–present

Miroslav Hanuš (born 22 May 1963) is a Czech actor.

== Selected filmography ==
=== Film ===
- ROMing (2007)
- Innocence (2011)
- We Are Never Alone (2016)
- Po strništi bos (2017)
- Domestik (2018)
- Charlatan (2020)
- Havel (2020)
- Droneman (2020)
- Her Drunken Diary (2024)

=== Television ===
- Ulice (2005)
- Případy 1. oddělení (2014)
- Iveta (2022)
- Stíny v mlze (2022)
- Podezření (2022)
