= Lucie Vondráčková =

Czech singer and actress

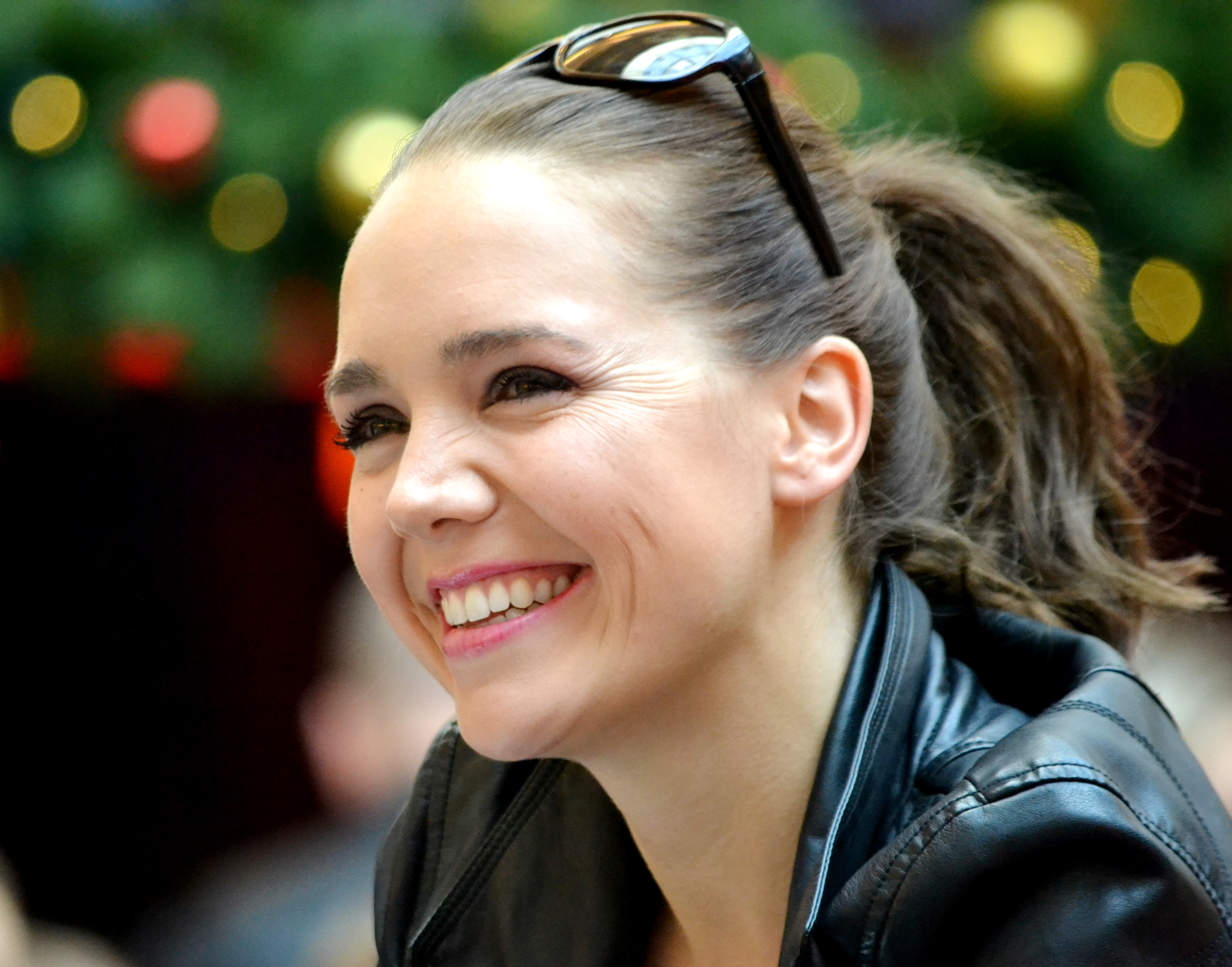
- Lucie Vondráčková in 2015
- Born: Lucie Vondráčková; 8 March 1980 (age 46); Prague, Czechoslovakia
- Occupations: Singer, actress
- Years active: 1991–present
- Spouse: Tomáš Plekanec (m. 2011; div. 2019)
- Children: 2
- Parent(s): Jiří Vondráček; Hana Sorrosa Vondráčková
- Relatives: Helena Vondráčková
- Musical career
- Genre: Pop
- Instrument: Vocals
- Years active: 1993–present
- Label: BrainZone

Lucie Vondráčková (born 8 March 1980) is a Czech actress and singer.

== Acting career ==
=== Film ===
Thanks to her acting skills, Lucie has caught the attention of international productions, such as Last Holiday, Joan of Arc, Beyond Her Lens, My Wacko Parents and Hotel Limbo. She has been awarded at international film festivals for the lead female role.

Her most recent appearance in the comedic role in the fairytale film Once Upon a Princess was showcased at the International Children’s Film Festival in Zlin, Universal Kids Film Festival and the San Diego International Kids’ Film Festival.

=== Theatre ===
Lucie Vondráčková began her acting career at the age of 9 at the National Theatre in the play The Satin Slipper. Since then, she has portrayed dozens of dramatic and comedic roles in many Prague theatres. Some of her most notable roles include Juliet, Desdemona, Anna Verkhovtseva (The Brothers Karamazov), Anya (The Cherry Orchard), and Margaret (Richard III).

After taking a break from the theatre, she returned with the role of Luisa in the successful play Happiness, performing alongside Hynek Čermák, and also took on the role of Sheila in the comedy Just to Be Clear with Tomáš Matonoha. She continues to play leading roles in popular productions such as The Christmas Miracle, The Secret, and Forget Shakespeare.

== Filmography ==
- Labyrint (2012) .... Renata
- "Rodinka" (2010) TV series .... Andula
- Country Club: První směna (2009) (video) .... Jana
- "Panelák" (2009) TV series .... Petra Pařízková
- Bathory (2008) .... Lucia
- The Wrong Mr. Johnson (2008) (video) .... Apollonia
- "Nemocnice na kraji města - nové osudy" (2008) TV series .... Linda
- Setkání v Praze, s vraždou (2008) (TV) .... Věra Hořejší
- Kvaska (2007) .... Karin
- V hlavní roli (2007) (TV) .... Tereza
- Manželé z roku 2006 (2006) (TV) .... Šárka Duspivová
- Poslední kouzlo (2006) (TV) .... princess Lída
- Last Holiday (2006) .... receptionist Marie
- The Fine Art of Love: Mine Ha-Ha (2005) .... Pamela
- Nepovedený kouzelník (2005) (TV) .... Jeduna
- Umění milovat (2005) (TV)
- In nomine patris (2004) (TV) .... Neumann's girlfriend
- Křesadlo (2004) (TV) .... princess Astrid
- Modrý Mauritius (2004) (TV) .... Božka
- Post Coitum (2004) .... Kristýna
- Snowboarďáci (2004) .... Klára
- Králoství hříchů (2003) (video) .... princess Alana
- Malvína (2003) .... fairy Malvína
- Báječná show (2002) (voice)
- Kožené slunce (2002) (TV) .... Alena Vazačová
- Královský slib (2001) .... Dina/page
- O víle Arnoštce (2001 (TV) .... Arnoštka
- Ta třetí (2001) (TV) .... Adéla
- Na zámku (200) (TV) .... Klára
- Kouzlený šíp (1998) (TV) .... princess Liliana
- Šmankote, babičko, čaruj! (1998) .... Esterka
- Nejasná zpráva o konci světa (1997) .... Lucie
- Tú žijú levy (1997) (TV)
- Hrad z písků (1994) .... daughter
- Nebeský pláč (1994) .... Jenna
- Ohnivé jaro (1994) .... Laura
- Císařovy nové šaty (1993) .... taylor
- Jenny Marx, la femme du diable (1993) (TV)
- Vikingové z Bronských vršků (1993) (TV) .... Bobena
- "Arabela Returns" (1993) TV series .... little doctor in Pultanela
- Sněhurka (1992) (TV)
- "Králoství květin" (1991) TV series .... Anna

=== Supporting roles in TV series ===
- 4teens (2011) playing receptionist Marie in episode: "Lyžák" 2011
- Strážce duší (2008) playing Karin in episode: "Neviditelný zabiják" 6 July 2009
- 3 plus 1 s Miroslavem Donutilem (2008) playing Šárka Viklická in episode: "Otcové a dcery" 5 April 2008
- 3 plus 1 s Miroslavem Donutilem (2008) playing Helena in episode: "Otcové a synové" 1 October 2008
- Hospoda (1996) playing "rebellian student" in episode: "Za školu" 1996
- Území bílých králů (1991)

== Theatre ==
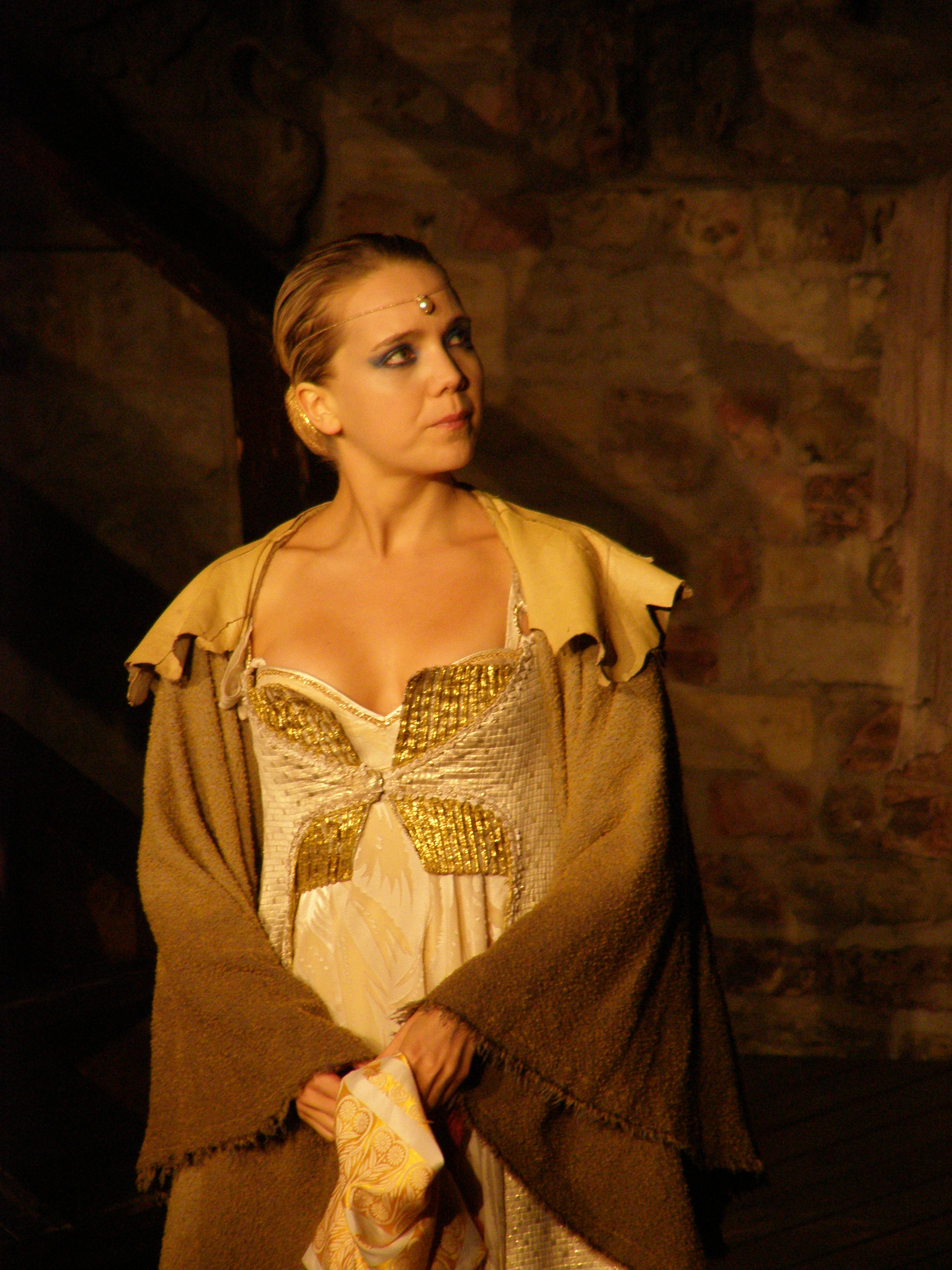
Vondráčková, on stage in 2007

- Ať žije rock'n'roll (2008) .... mladá svazačka Yveta, Divadlo Broadway
- Touha (2008) .... Karin, Divadlo Kalich (Daniel Landa)
- La Douce (2007) .... La Douce, Theatre L´ APOSTROPHE, Scene nationale Cergy-Pontoise –Val d´Oise-Théatre des Arts, Théatre des Louvrais, (Dostoyevskiy)*
- Dumb Show (2007) .... journalist Liz, Divadlo Ungelt (Joe Penhall)
- Othello (2006) .... Desdemona, Summer Shakespeare Festival, Prague (William Shakespeare)
- Brothers Karamazow (2006) .... ???, Divadlo Husa na provázku, Brno (Yekaterina Ivanovna Vrchova)
- Tajemství (2005) .... Doctor Eliška, Kalich Theatre (Daniel Landa)
- Timberlake Wertenbaker|Pod Jižním křížem (2004) .... Marie, Rokoko Theatre
- Excalibur (2003) .... Morgan, Divadlo Ta Fantastika (Michal Pavlíček, Steigerwald, Jan Sahara Hedl
- Skřivánek (2002) .... ???, Rokoko Theatre (J. Anouilh)
- Hrobka s vyhlídkou (2002) .... Nurse, Rokoko Theatre (Norman Robbins)
- Starci na chmelu (2001) .... ???, Divadlo Milénium
- Closer (2001) .... ???, Rokoko Theatre (Patrick Marber)
- Čarodějky ze Salemu (2000) .... Mary Warren, Rokoko Theatre
- Black Comedy (play) (2000) .... ???, Rokoko Theatre (Peter Shaffer)
- Richard III (2000) .... ???, Kašpar Theatre Company, Prague
- Kašpar (2000) .... Anna / Markéta / písař
- The Cherry Orchard (1998) .... Aoa, Theatre Rokoko (Anton Pavlovich Chekhov)
- Romeo and Juliet (1997) .... Juliet (William Shakespeare)
- The Satin Slipper (1992) .... (by Paul Claudel), National Theatre, Prague

== Discography ==
=== 1990s ===
- 1993 - Marmeláda (Tommü Records)
- 1994 - Rok 2060 (Tommü Records)
- 1995 - Atlantida (Tommü Records)
- 1997 - Malá Mořská Víla (Tommü Records)
- 1998 - The Best Of English Version (Tommü Records)

=== 2000s ===
- 2000 - Manon (Tommü Records)
- 2003 - Mayday (Tommü Records)
- 2005 - Boomerang (Tommü Records)
- 2007 - Pel Mel 1993 - 2007 (Universal)
- 2008 - Fénix (Tommü Records) 2-CD set

=== 2010s ===
- 2010 - Dárek (Tommü Records)
- 2013 - Oheň (BrainZone)
- 2018 - Růže

=== 2020s ===
- 2021 - Láskověty
- 2023 - Letokruhy
