= Karel Janák =

Czech director

- Born: 24 September 1970 (age 55); Prague, Czechoslovakia
- Education: FNSPE CTU, FAMU
- Occupation: Film director

Karel Janák (born 24 September 1970) is a Czech director. His 2004 film Snowboarďáci was recognised at the 2004 Czech Lion Awards as the most-visited film of the year.

== Selected filmography ==
- Snowboarďáci (2004)
- Ro(c)k podvraťáků (2006)
- Rafťáci (2006)
- Little Knights Tale (Ať žijí rytíři!, 2009)
- 10 Rules (2014)
- Princess and the scribe (Princezna a písař, 2014, television film)
