= Princess and the Scribe =

2014 Czech television film

- Directed by: Karel Janák
- Starring: Matouš Ruml, Monika Timková
- Country of origin: Czech Republic
- Original language: Czech

Production
- Running time: 81 Minutes
- Production company: Czech Television

Original release
- Release: 2014

Princess and the Scribe (Czech: Princezna a písař) is a 2014 Czech television film directed by Karel Janák. It is a fairy tale action film. It premiered on 24 December 2014. It was viewed by more than 2 million people (51% share).

== Cast ==
- Matouš Ruml as Scribe Janek
- Monika Timková as Princess Amálka
- Maroš Kramár as Dietrich
- Jiří Bartoška as the King
- Petr Nárožný as Scapani
- Jiří Hána as Ludvík
- Radim Kalvoda as Herkul
- Norbert Lichý as Stach
- Bára Srncová as Marie
- Jiří Dvořák as Přibík

== Production ==
The film was shot during 2014 at Velhartice Castle, Martinice palace and on Ploučnice.
