= Lotrando a Zubejda =

1997 Czech fairy tale film

- Directed by: Karel Smyczek
- Written by: Zdeněk Svěrák; Karel Smyczek
- Based on: Karel Čapek; Zdeněk Svěrák
- Produced by: Karel Škop, Robert Fuksa
- Starring: Jiří Strach; Barbora Seidlová; Pavel Zedníček; Arnošt Goldflam; Jiří Pecha; Jiří Lábus; Miroslav Táborský; Ladislav Gerendáš; Jaroslav Sypal; Marián Labuda; Ljuba Krbová
- Cinematography: Jan Malíř
- Edited by: Zdeněk Patočka
- Music by: Jaroslav Uhlíř
- Release date: 11 September 1997
- Running time: 106 minutes
- Countries: Czech Republic; Bulgaria; France
- Language: Czech

Lotrando a Zubejda (Czech for 'Lotrando and Zubejda') is a 1997 Czech musical fairy tale film directed by Karel Smyczek and written by Zdeněk Svěrák as an adaptation of two fairy tales: "Doctors" and "Highwaymen", by Karel Čapek, from the book Niner Fairytales: And One More Thrown in for Good Measure.

== Plot ==
In Bohemia, the aging brigand Lotrando leads a band of robbers. Preoccupied with his trade, he belatedly realizes that his son has grown into an uneducated young man, and sends him to a monastery to be properly raised. Among the monks, young Lotrando becomes a refined and gentle man. Returning home to his dying father, whom the band has deserted, he promises to carry on the trade, not yet knowing what it is, and feels bound to honor that promise. Too well-mannered to successfully rob anyone, he holds up the woodcutter Drnec only to befriend him.

Meanwhile, in the distant sultanate of Soliman, no cure can be found for the ailing princess Zubejda, the sultan's daughter, whom he means to give as the seventh wife of another sultan. When Mr. Lustig, a Bohemian traveler and a friend of Soliman, advises that a doctor from Bohemia would be her best hope, a delegation is sent there to find a man bearing the title "Dr." Because of his name, Drnec is mistaken for a doctor and, believing himself hired for his woodcutting, brought to the palace with Lotrando as his assistant. There they meet the princess and her maid, fellow countrywoman La Mad.

Drnec knows nothing of medicine, and once the mistake is revealed, the two are imprisoned and condemned to death. Lotrando recalls a proverb that where the sun does not go, the doctor does, and with Lustig's help he and Drnec sneak away to fell the tall trees outside the princess's windows. Exposed to sunlight and fresh air, Zubejda recovers. She and Lotrando quickly bond, and on learning of the sultan's plan to marry her off, he falls ill himself and is found to be lovesick; he also discovers that La Mad is his long-lost mother, Madla. Zubejda persuades her father to let her wed Lotrando instead, and the couple marry and settle in Bohemia.

== Cast ==
- Jiří Strach as Lotrando
- Barbora Seidlová as Zubejda
- Pavel Zedníček as Drnec
- Arnošt Goldflam as Mr. Lustig
- Jiří Lábus as Vince
- Jiří Pecha as Old Lotrando
- Marián Labuda as Sultan
- Miroslav Táborský as Hali
- Ladislav Gerendáš as Beli
- Jaroslav Sypal as Zeli
- Ljuba Krbová as La Mad/Madla
- Josef Karlík as Prior
- Vladimír Javorský as Father Amadeus
- Jaroslava Krettschmerová as Stepmother
- Naďa Konvalinková as Drnec's wife
- Barbora Srncová as Anna
- Oldřich Navrátil as Muezzin

== Reception and legacy ==
The film was described as a "modern fairytale, simple and clever".

The film was a national success and the director himself adapted it on stage in 2024.
