= Bourák =

2020 film

- Directed by: Ondřej Trojan
- Written by: Petr Jarchovský
- Produced by: Ondřej Trojan
- Starring: Ivan Trojan
- Production company: Total HelpArt T.H.A.
- Release date: 11 June 2020
- Country: Czech Republic
- Language: Czech

Bourák is a 2020 Czech gangster romantic comedy film directed by Ondřej Trojan. It stars Ivan Trojan.

== Plot ==
The film is set in a fictional town Šlukdorf. Bourák is an auto mechanic who loves music and dance and refuses to "grow up." His daughter Kamila becomes fed up with life in Šlukdorf and her fathers irresponsibility.

== Cast ==
- Ivan Trojan as Bourák
- Veronika Marková as Kamila
- Kristýna Boková as Markéta
- Jiří Macháček as Ruda
- Kateřina Winterová as Elvíra
- Petra Nesvačilová as Jiřina
- Jaromír Dulava as Luděk
