= Šumná =

- Municipality
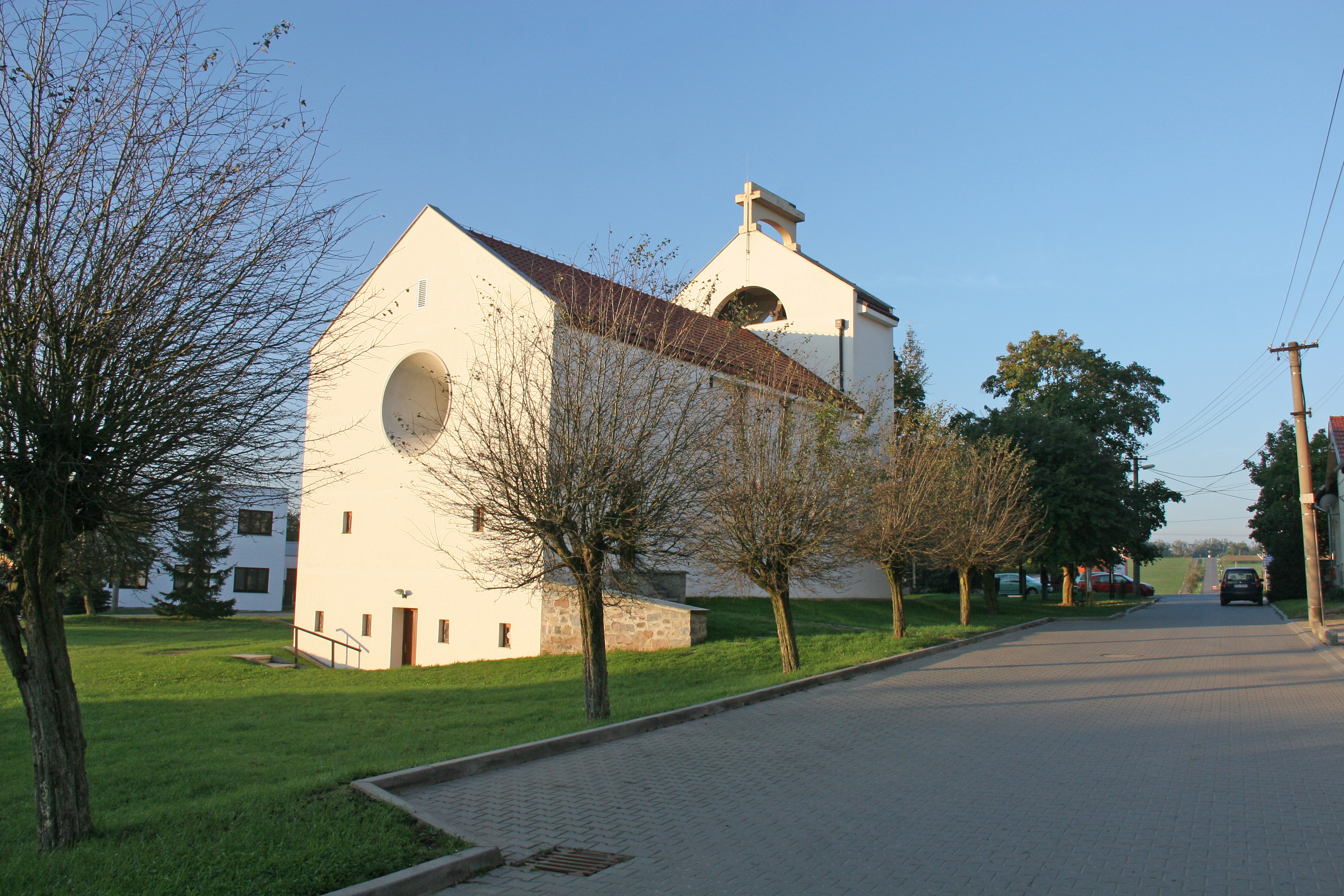
- Church of the Holy Spirit

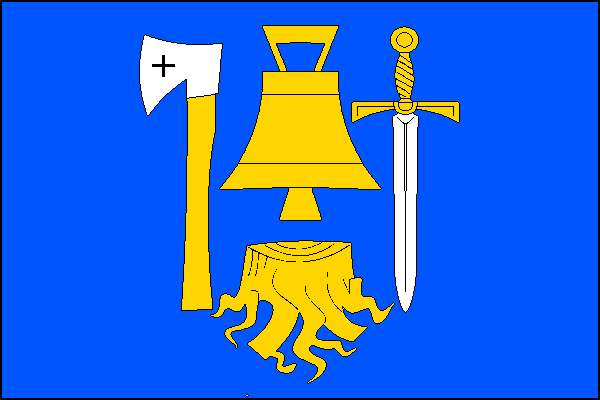
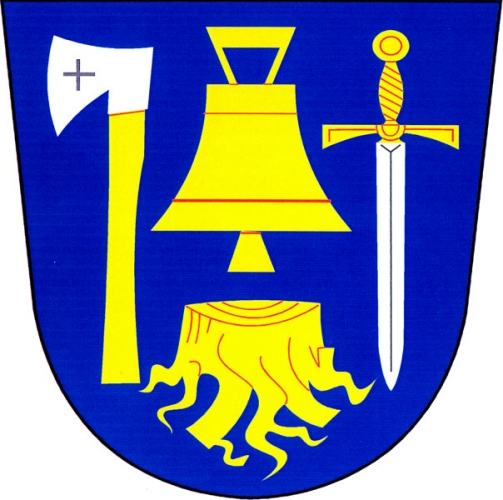
- Flag Coat of arms

- Location in the Czech Republic
- Coordinates: 48°55′21″N 15°52′15″E
- Country: Czech Republic
- Region: South Moravian
- District: Znojmo
- First mentioned: 1798

Area
  - Total: 11.96 km^{2} (4.62 sq mi)
- Elevation: 438 m (1,437 ft)

Population (2026-01-01)
  - Total: 639
  - Density: 53.4/km^{2} (138/sq mi)
- Time zone: UTC+1 (CET)
  - Summer (DST): UTC+2 (CEST)
- Postal code: 671 02
- Website: www.obecsumna.cz

Šumná (until 1949 Šumvald; German: Schönwald) is a municipality and village in Znojmo District in the South Moravian Region of the Czech Republic. It has about 600 inhabitants.

Šumná lies approximately 15 kilometres (9 mi) north-west of Znojmo, 62 km (39 mi) south-west of Brno, and 167 km (104 mi) south-east of Prague.

== Demographics ==
Historical population
Year	Pop.	±%
1869	196	—
1880	229	+16.8%
1890	185	−19.2%
1900	211	+14.1%
1910	236	+11.8%
1921	418	+77.1%
1930	629	+50.5%
1950	531	−15.6%
1961	522	−1.7%
1970	560	+7.3%
1980	627	+12.0%
1991	632	+0.8%
2001	606	−4.1%
2011	587	−3.1%
2021	592	+0.9%
Source: Censuses
