= Doktor Martin (Czech TV series) =

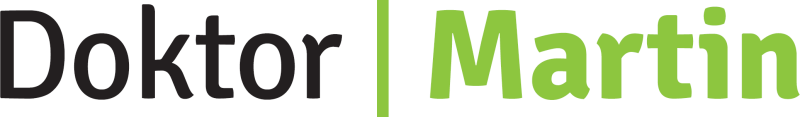
- Written by: Štefan Titka; Tomáš Končinský; Tereza Dusová; Milada Mašinová; Paula Sisková; Hynek Trojánek; Petr Šiška
- Directed by: Petr Zahrádka
- Starring: Miroslav Donutil; Jitka Čvančarová
- Countries of origin: Czech Republic; Slovakia
- Original languages: Czech; Slovak
- No. of seasons: 2
- No. of episodes: 32

Production
- Production location: Velké Karlovice
- Editor: Marek Opatrný
- Camera setup: Miloslav Holman
- Running time: 51–53 minutes

Original release
- Network: ČT1; RTVS
- Release: 2015 – 2016

Doktor Martin is a comedy television series produced by Czech Television and RTVS. It is based on the British series Doc Martin.

On 24 September 2015, RTVS announced that a second sixteen-part season was prepared, which Donutil announced that it was the series' last season on 23 August 2016.

== Cast ==
- Miroslav Donutil as Martin Elinger
- Jitka Čvančarová as Lída Klasnová
- Jana Štěpánková as Marie Loukotová
- Gabriela Marcinková as Irena Dolejšová
- Norbert Lichý as Antonín Brázda
- Tomáš Měcháček as Miloš Brázda
- Robert Mikluš as Tomáš Topinka
- Václav Kopta as Robert Fiala
- Milena Steinmasslová as Sandra Kunešová
- Adam Vohánka as Péťa Krása
- Tereza Vilišová as Krásová
- Lukáš Latinák as Dan Lipovský
- Eva Leinweberová as Karolína Sovová

== Production ==
The script was written by Štefan Titka, Tereza Dusová, Tomáš Končinsky and Ondřej Provazník and directed by Petr Zahrádka. Doktor Martin was prepared by Kateřina Ondřejková's Creative and Production Group in co-production with Bionaut and in cooperation with Slovak RTVS and producer Zuzana Mistríková from RubRes.

Filming took place from spring 2014, with the fictional Beskydy village of Protějov represented by the municipality of Velké Karlovice.

The MediaMania server compared the basic plot of the series to Doktoři z Počátků on TV Nova, where the main character Ota Kovář – played by Martin Stránský – also goes to the countryside as a general practitioner. Mediář and DigiZone also compared the theme of a doctor in the mountainous countryside to the German television series Der Bergdoktor.
