= On the Road (Czech TV series) =

Czech documentary travelogue television series

- Na cestě
- Genre: Documentary travelogue
- Narrated by: Jiří Bartoška; Miroslav Donutil
- Country of origin: Czech Republic
- Original language: Czech
- No. of episodes: 500+

Production
- Running time: 26 minutes
- Production company: FRMOL production

Original release
- Network: Czech Television
- Release: 2006 – present

On the Road (Czech: "Na cestě") is a documentary travelogue series on Czech Television. On The Road is produced by FRMOL production www.frmol.com. Since 2006, Czech Television has broadcast more than 500 episodes of the programme. Movies of the series cover the lifestyle, habits and the typical features of the regions around the world. Each episode takes 26 minutes and is presented by the voices of Czech actors Jiří Bartoška and Miroslav Donutil.
