= Tuláček =

- Directed by: Václav Chaloupek
- Country of origin: Czech Republic
- Original language: Czech
- No. of seasons: 1
- No. of episodes: 7

Production
- Running time: 8 minutes

Original release
- Network: Czech Television
- Release: 17 December – 23 December 1997

Tuláček is a Czech television series filmed in 1997 and first broadcast as part of the evening program in December of the same year.

The series is part of a cycle series of natural history stories that Václav Chaloupek invented and realized for Czech Television. Each series was dedicated to a different animal species.

The cameraman of the series was Ladislav Moulis. The music was composed by Přemysl Haas and performed by Jaroslav Samson Lenk. The series was narrated by Petr Haničinec. Tuláček was played by fox Pusík. 7 episodes were filmed, lasting about 8 minutes. Filming took 3 months.

== Synopsis ==
The main protagonist of the story is a fox cub Tuláček. The story begins with hunters trying to dig out a fox's den after discovering it. However, the mother fox took the cubs away in time, but one was accidentally left behind. He becomes the Wanderer, who must learn to live in the forest without his mother...
