= Droneman =

- Czech poster
- Directed by: Petr Zelenka
- Written by: Petr Zelenka
- Starring: Kryštof Hádek; Jiří Mádl
- Cinematography: Alexander Šurkala
- Edited by: Vladimír Barák
- Music by: Janez Dovč
- Distributed by: Falcon a.s.
- Release date: 6 February 2020; (Czech Republic)
- Running time: 110 min.
- Countries: Czech Republic; Slovakia; Slovenia
- Language: Czech
- Budget: 32,695,000 CZK

Droneman (Czech: Modelář) is a 2020 Czech psychological thriller film directed by Petr Zelenka. It stars Kryštof Hádek and Jiří Mádl.

== Plot ==
Droneman is about chemist and fly navigator Pavel and his friend businessman and free time rapper Plech. Pavel has strong sense of justice and wishes to fix wrongs with the world while Plech dreams about big money and secure life. Their common passion are drones since school. Pavel returns from abroad and meets again with Plech and together they use drones to start a business. They monitor Power Stations, wear luxury handbags at the show or spray the Petřín Tower from the air. Their clients even include Presidential candidate. Everything changes when one of them decides to misuse drones. Pavel is involved in activism against torture at Guantanamo Bay and believes that Supreme American politicians should be judged for it. It gets him into conflict with more rational Plech and other people. Starts to lose his illusion and decides to commit an assault of American Vice President Dick Cheney during his visit of Prague in 2000. He decides to use a drone during the assassination, but during the act he is unable to kill Cheney and gets killed by the Police.

== Cast ==
- Kryštof Hádek as Pavel
- Jiří Mádl as Plech
- Veronika Khek Kubařová as Eva
- Zuzana Fialová as Jana
- Richard Stanke as Jan Zavadil
- Helena Dvořáková as Petra
- Miroslav Hanuš as Kasl
- Jiří Štrébl as Aleš
- Kristýna Frejová as Lenka
- Jan Vondráček as Dick Cheney
