= Neviditelní =

- Directed by: Radek Bajgar
- Creative director: Radek Bajgar
- Starring: Jiří Langmajer; Jiří Bartoška; Ivana Chýlková; Luděk Sobota
- Country of origin: Czech Republic
- Original language: Czech
- No. of seasons: 1
- No. of episodes: 13

Production
- Running time: 50 minutes

Original release
- Network: ČT1
- Release: September 5 – November 28, 2014

Neviditelní (English: The Invisibles) is a Czech adventure comedy television series produced by Czech Television, which premiered on ČT1 from September 5, 2014, to November 28, 2014. It was written and directed by Radek Bajgar while company Logline Production produced the series. Jiří Bartoška, Jiří Langmajer, Ivana Chýlková, Luděk Sobota and others play the main roles in the series about vodník's.

13 episodes were produced.

== Plot ==
The series is about water people - vodníks, who differ from others by having a certain amount of aquagen, which makes them able to live underwater. However their species is slowly disappearing from the world. They try to save themselves and not to reveal themselves to "dry" people. However, there are also so-called "wolves" who are vodníks who do not know that they are water people. One example is lobbyist Ivan Laušman who finds out he is vodník after he tries to commit suicide by drowning. Other vodníks, however, are concerned that the monitored lobbyist might cause their existence to be revealed.

== Cast ==
- Jiří Langmajer as Ivan Laušman
- Luděk Sobota as Eduard Baretti
- Kristýna Boková as Johana Baretti
- Jiří Bartoška as Hubert Vydra
- Ivana Chýlková as Nora Vydrová, Hubert's wife
- Kryštof Hádek as Robert Vydra, Hubert's son
- Lenka Vlasáková as doctor Magda Mráčková
- Marie Doležalová as Berková
- Barbora Poláková as Monika
- Simona Babčáková as police commissioner Eva Jará
- Lukáš Příkazký as inspector Stanislav Trpělka
- Marian Roden as bishop Čeněk Láska
- Iva Pazderková as jezina Lige
- Jana Plodková as jezina Agla
- Sandra Nováková as jezina Thea
- Jaromír Dulava as father Voda
- Ondřej Hejma as a member of water council
- Františka Čížková as a member of water council
- Pavlína Danková as a member of water council
- Jolana Voldánová as a member of water council
- Václav Vorlíček as a member of water council
- Eva Leinweberová as a member of water council
- Radek Holub as Rudolf Ratus, called Rat
- Richard Stanke as Sikorský
- Jan Vlas as policeman
- Marika Šoposká as Monika's friend

== Episodes ==
No.	Title	Directed by	Original release date	Czech viewers (millions)
1	"1"	Radek Bajgar	September 5, 2013	0.790
2	"2"	Radek Bajgar	September 12, 2013	0.783
3	"3"	Radek Bajgar	September 19, 2013	0.716
4	"4"	Radek Bajgar	September 26, 2013	0.630
5	"5"	Radek Bajgar	October 3, 2013	0.702
6	"6"	Radek Bajgar	October 10, 2013	0.504
7	"7"	Radek Bajgar	October 17, 2013	0.607
8	"8"	Radek Bajgar	October 24, 2013	0.590
9	"9"	Radek Bajgar	October 31, 2013	0.643
10	"10"	Radek Bajgar	November 7, 2013	0.659
11	"11"	Radek Bajgar	November 14, 2013	0.624
12	"12"	Radek Bajgar	November 21, 2013	0.623
13	"13"	Radek Bajgar	November 28, 2013	0.627

== Production ==
Czech Television approved the production of the series in autumn 2012. Michal Reitler served as creative producer. Series was co-produced by Logline Production company.

Program director Milan Fridrich stated in April 2014 that the series should be a reinforcement of the comedy genre in the Czech Television program, alongside crime, retro and historical series. The finished series was presented at the Karlovy Vary International Film Festival in July of the same year.

Press conference for the series took place on 24 July 2014 with the participation of the main stars of the series.

== Reception ==
MF DNES critic Mirka Spáčilová called the series, judging by the first episode, "the biggest disappointment of the autumn season". She criticized it as a poorly handled period satire, with shallow humor and "stilted, contrived, unnatural" acting, albeit with lighter moments. According to TV screenwriter Jan Žáček, who evaluated the series based on the watched episode 7 and, like Spáčilová, compared it to the unattainable film model How to Drown Dr. Mracek, the Lawyer (1974), a satire on contemporary Czech conditions as well as humor, remained "invisible because it is toothless and unaddressed". He rated some of the acting as replays due to poor direction. On the contrary, Eva Zajíčková from Právo highlighted the efforts of the creators and Czech Television to "ventilate the domestic atmosphere, which has been dominated by stale relationship series and popular jokes for years, with smarter humor". In her opinion, the Invisibles were "funnier than any television competition at the moment", although she acknowledged that the series "would have benefited from a stronger dramaturgical intervention" and the debut screenwriter and director Radek Bajgar was helped by "support in excellent actors".
