= Dějiny udatného českého národa =

- Written by: Lucie Seifertová; Pavel Koutský
- Directed by: Pavel Koutský
- Starring: Jiří Lábus
- Country of origin: Czech Republic
- Original language: Czech
- No. of seasons: 3
- No. of episodes: 111

Production
- Producers: Tomas Rychecky, Viktor Mayer
- Running time: 3 minutes

Original release
- Network: Czech Television
- Release: 2 January 2010 – 1 July 2012

Dějiny udatného českého národa (The History of the Brave Czech Nation) is a cartoon series for children about Czech history. It was written by Lucie Seifertová. Czech lion serves as the narrator accompanying the series and is voiced by Jiří Lábus.

The series was first broadcast by Czech Television in 2010–2012. It competed in the International Competition of Short Animated Films for Children at the 49th International Film Festival for Children and Youth Zlín 2009 and at the 8th International Animated Film Festival Anifest 2009 in Třebon.

The series is based on a 2003 book by Lucie Seifertová of the same name. The book won the Magnesia Litera award as a book of the year 2003 for children and youth, the Golden Ribbon for the year 2003 in the category of non-fiction and popular science literature for children, and the Golden Seal award for polygraphic processing.
