= Caught in the Net (2020 film) =

2020 Czech documentary film

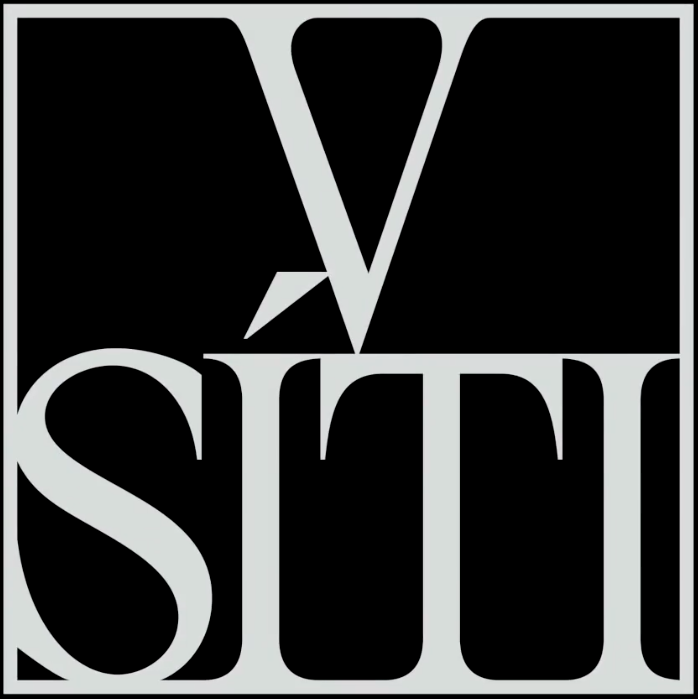
- Logo of the Film
- Czech: V síti
- Directed by: Barbora Chalupová; Vít Klusák
- Written by: Barbora Chalupová; Vít Klusák
- Cinematography: Adam Kruliš
- Music by: Jonatán Pastirčák
- Production company: Czech Television
- Distributed by: Aerofilms
- Release date: 27 February 2020
- Running time: 100 minutes
- Countries: Czech Republic; Slovakia
- Language: Czech
- Budget: 3 million Kč
- Box office: 61.3 million Kč

Caught in the Net (Czech: V síti) is a 2020 Czech documentary film by Vít Klusák about sexual predators on the internet. The film documents three actresses pretending to be adolescent girls on social media who are contacted by sexual predators that try to seduce them and start sending them photos of their genitalia. Sexual predators appearing in the film attracted focus of police after the release of the film and some were arrested and criminally charged. The film was crowdfunded through HitHit during which filmmakers raised 3 million Czech koruna. The film was named Best Documentary of 2020 at the 2021 Czech Lion Awards.

== Cast ==
- Tereza Těžká
- Anežka Pithartová
- Sabina Dlouhá
- Vít Klusák

== Release ==
The film released on 27 February 2020 and quickly became the best grossing Czech documentary film. An edited version for schools was released under name Caught in the Net: Behind School (Czech: V síti: Za školou). An uncensored version called Caught in the Net 18+ premiered on 9 July 2020. One of the sexual predators contacted a lawyer in an attempt to prevent release of the uncensored version.

== See also ==
- Hard Candy
- To Catch a Predator
