= Bubáci a hastrmani =

Czech animated television series

- Directed by: Pavel Kubant
- Composer: Jan Rotter
- Country of origin: Czech Republic
- Original language: Czech
- No. of seasons: 2
- No. of episodes: 26

Production
- Producers: Tomas Rychecky, Viktor Mayer
- Editor: Magda Sandersova
- Running time: 8 minutes

Original release
- Network: Czech Television
- Release: 21 December 1999 – 19 January 2005

Bubáci a hastrmani (Spooks and Goblins) is a Czech animated television series from 1999 broadcast as part of Večerníček. The second series was filmed in 2005. The author of the original was the painter and writer Josef Lada, his story was developed into a script by Marie Kšajtová and Eva Povondrová. According to Alena Ladova, Josef Lada's sister, the creative work was done by Pavel Kubant, Kateřiná Lánská and Jana Hlaváčková. Pavel Kubant directed. Milan Rychecký was the cameraman. The fairy tales were narrated by Josef Somr. A total of 26 episodes of 8 minutes each were filmed.

The series for Czech Television was produced by the ANIFILM studio using the flat panel technique.

== Plot ==
The first season is about adventures of ghostly apprentice Bubáček and his friend, a hastrman boy Pulec.

The second season changed format to an anthology series. When Bubáček and Pulec were still small, winters came so bitterly that the shingles on the roofs cracked due to the frost. Back then, neighbors of Syslov met every evening at the mill and told each other fairy tales to pass the long winter. As everyone already knows, people, ghosts and their children live together in the village of Syslov. And it is children who are the most grateful listeners and want to hear a fairy tale every evening.

== Episodes ==
=== Season 1 ===
1. Začíná pohádka o strašidlech
2. Mulisákův Bubáček
3. Letecké dobrodružství
4. Večerní povídačky
5. Bouřka ve škole
6. Zloději v Syslově
7. Pulcova krasojízda
8. Pulec učedníkem
9. Bubáčkovo strašení
10. Zakázaná cesta
11. Pulcova živnost
12. Bubáčkův návrat
13. Jak to všechno dopadlo

=== Season 2 ===
1. O neposlušných kozlátkách
2. O červené karkulce (based on Little Red Riding Hood, and of course Jiri Brdecka's works)
3. Sedm krejčích a jedna moucha
4. Budulínek Mandelinka (based on the 1978 short film)
5. O hodném slonu a zlomyslém krejčíkovi
6. O koníku Ferdovi
7. Vašíkova cesta do Betléma
8. Honza v pekle
9. O zázračném jablíčku
10. Perníkový dědek (Gingerman Grandfather, based on Dagmar Doubkova's work; additionally, Viktor Mayer assisted but uncredited)
11. O líném Honzovi (based on the 1983 short film; additionally, Viktor Mayer assisted but uncredited)
12. Masopust
13. Jak šlo vejce na vandr (based on Josef Kluge's work; additionally, Viktor Mayer assisted but uncredited)
