= Charlatan (2020 film) =

2020 film

- Official poster
- Directed by: Agnieszka Holland
- Written by: Marek Epstein
- Produced by: Sarka Cimbalova
- Starring: Ivan Trojan; Josef Trojan; Juraj Loj; Jaroslava Pokorná
- Cinematography: Martin Strba
- Music by: Antoni Komasa-Łazarkiewicz
- Production company: Marlene Film Production
- Distributed by: Cinemart
- Release date: 27 February 2020 (Berlin International Film Festival)
- Running time: 118 minutes
- Countries: Czech Republic; Ireland; Slovakia; Poland
- Language: Czech
- Budget: 58.9 Million CZK
- Box office: 38.2 Million CZK

Charlatan (Czech: Šarlatán) is a 2020 biographical historical drama film directed by Agnieszka Holland and written by Marek Epstein, loosely based on the healer Jan Mikolášek (1889–1973), who cured hundreds of people using plant-based remedies. It was selected as the Czech entry for the Best International Feature Film at the 93rd Academy Awards making the February shortlist. It won five awards including Best Film at the 2021 Czech Lion Awards.

== Plot ==
The life of Jan Mikolášek, a well-known and successful Czech healer, who diagnosed and healed people using his intuition and his familiarity with plants. He offered remedies and prescriptions which included lifestyle and dietary changes. He healed people from the villages but also many well-known people, including the Czechoslovak President, Antonín Zápotocký. Mikolášek's diagnostic methods and healing piqued the attention of Czechoslovakia's government. He was finally arrested after strychnine was found in the bodies of two men he had treated.

In real life, Jan Mikolášek was tried and convicted in 1959 of tax and other offenses, but not for murder by strychnine poisoning, was released in 1963, and died in 1973.

== Cast ==
- Ivan Trojan as Jan Mikolášek
  - Josef Trojan as Young Mikolášek
- Juraj Loj as František
- Daniela Voráčková as Johanka
- Jaroslava Pokorná as Mülbacherová
- Miroslav Hanuš as Investigator
- Tomáš Jeřábek as Member of Secret Service
- Martin Myšička as Father
- Václav Kopta as the Judge
- Jan Budař as Bureaucrat
- Joachim Paul Assböck as Fritz Kiesewetter

== Production ==
The film was a Czech-Irish-Polish-Slovak co-production. The venture included Marlene Film Production (Czech Republic), Kevan Van Thompson, Mike Downey (Chairman of European Film Academy) and Sam Taylor – both from Film & Music Entertainment Ltd (Ireland), Madants (Poland) and Furia Film (Slovakia). Others involved were Czech Television, Barrandov Studio, Studio Metrage, Moderator Inwestycje, Radio and Television of Slovakia, CertiCon, Vladimír a Taťána Maříkovi, and Magic Lab.

Shooting started on 1 April 2019 at Mladá Boleslav Prison. Principal photography took 36 Days. Shooting concluded in July 2019. The film entered postproduction on 4 July 2019.

== Release ==
The film premiered at Berlin International Film Festival on 27 February 2020. It was set to enter distribution for Czech cinemas on 26 March 2020. Due to the COVID-19 pandemic, distribution was delayed to 20 August 2020. The film was viewed by 59,073 people during its first weekend in Czech Theatres. Despite strong competition, the film had strong attendance during its second weekend with 37,000 people, only narrowly beaten only by Tenet.

== Reception ==
The film has received generally positive reviews from Czech critics holding 74% at Kinobox.cz based on 12 reviews. The film was also positively received by foreign reviews. Charlatan has an approval rating of 89% on review aggregator website Rotten Tomatoes, based on 35 reviews, and an average rating of 6.8/10. The critics consensus says: "Charlatan's slightly dry approach is offset by unique filmmaking flourishes and a fascinating story that make this an engaging, albeit unusual, biopic." Metacritic assigned the film a weighted average score of 66 out of 100, based on seven critics, indicating generally favourable reviews.

"Charlatan is a film that does not quite satisfy the curiosity it arouses", states Peter Bradshaw in his review for The Guardian from the Berlinale. "Was Mikolášek a 'charlatan'? Rightly or wrongly, the movie is vehement that he was not. The drama in no way resides in any lingering ambiguity. This Mikolášek is a man of principle and intuitive genius who presides over a flourishing practice. (...) He is played with fiercely controlled stoicism by the veteran Czech actor Ivan Trojan, whose son Josef plays the young Mikolášek. (...) This is a forceful, capable movie with an interesting story to tell but its potency consists in a handful of gripping episodes, the most startling being when the young Mikolášek has developed a love of herbs and a vocation for healing."

=== Accolades ===
On 3 August 2020, Charlatan was chosen to be part of Telluride Film Festival 2020 lineup. It was also recommended for a nomination for the 33rd European Film Awards by European Film Academy.

It was nominated for 14 Czech Lion Awards, including the Best film. Ivan Trojan won Czech Film Critics' Award for Best Actor and Agnieszka Holland for Best Director.

On 6 March 2021, Charlatan won five Czech Lion Awards including Best Picture, Best Director (Agnieszka Holland), and Best Lead Actor (Ivan Trojan).

== See also ==
- List of submissions to the 93rd Academy Awards for Best International Feature Film
- List of Czech submissions for the Academy Award for Best International Feature Film
