= Havel (film) =

2020 Czech biopic film

- Directed by: Slávek Horák
- Written by: Slávek Horák; Rudolf Suchánek
- Produced by: Slávek Horák
- Starring: Viktor Dvořák
- Cinematography: Jan Šťastný
- Edited by: Vladimír Barák
- Production company: Tvorba Films
- Distributed by: Bontonfilm
- Release date: 16 July 2020
- Running time: 105 minutes
- Country: Czech Republic
- Language: Czech
- Budget: 60 million CZK
- Box office: 21 million CZK

Havel is a 2020 Czech historical film based on the life of dissident and former Czech president Václav Havel. It is directed by Slávek Horák and stars Viktor Dvořák. The film focuses on Havel's life from 1968 to 1989, when he was a dissident under the communist regime, as well as his relationship with his wife Olga and friend Pavel Landovský.

== Synopsis ==
The film starts in 1968. Václav Havel works as a playwright at Theatre on the Balustrade, where he receives ovations. His career is interrupted by the Warsaw Pact invasion of Czechoslovakia. The story then moves to 1976, when he participates in the preparation of Charter 77, which leads to his imprisonment. The story largely focuses on Havel's personal life and relationship with his wife Olga. The film ends in 1989, during the Velvet Revolution.

== Cast ==
- Viktor Dvořák as Václav Havel
- Aňa Geislerová as Olga Havlová
- Martin Hofmann as Pavel Landovský
- Stanislav Majer as Pavel Kohout
- Barbora Seidlová as Anna Kohoutová
- Jiří Bartoška as Jan Patočka
- Adrian Jastraban as Alexander Dubček
- Michal Isteník as interrogator
- Jiří Wohanka as interrogator
- Miroslav Hanuš as Václav Havel’s lawyer
- Vanda Janda as secretary

== See also ==
- Dubček
- Walesa: Man of Hope
