= AZ-kvíz =

- Genre: Quiz show
- Presented by: Aleš Zbořil, Eva Machourková
- Country of origin: Czech Republic
- Original language: Czech

Production
- Producer: Czech Television
- Production locations: Brno, Czech Republic
- Running time: ~25 minutes

Original release
- Network: ČT1
- Release: 2 January 1997 – present

AZ-kvíz (English: AZ-quiz) is a Czech television quiz show airing on ČT1 since 1997. It is hosted by Aleš Zbořil and Eva Machourková.

== Rules ==
The game board

Each game consists of two players and is played on a triangular board of 28 cells. The object of the game is for a player to earn enough cells to connect all three sides of the triangle before their opponent. Players take turns choosing cells, which each contain a general knowledge trivia question and the initials of the answer; for example, if the answer was Charles de Gaulle, the cell would say "CdG".

If a player gets their question right within 5 seconds, they win the cell. If they do not, their opponent can choose to answer the question, with a correct answer earning them the cell and a wrong answer giving the original player the next turn. If neither player answers the question correctly, the cell turns black, and players can select it again, but it is instead a substitute True/False question. Getting the substitute question right wins a player the cell, and getting it wrong gives the cell to their opponent. If by the end of the allotted game time neither player has connected all three sides of the triangle, the player with the most cells wins, and if there is a tie there is a sudden death question.

Each episode has four players, with two semifinals and a final. In the semifinal rounds, cells are numbered from 1 to 28, and the answers are always multiple words. In the final round, cells have letters usually from A to Ž (letters vary between episodes) and answers are always one word starting with that letter.

The winner of the final goes to the ATM round, in which they choose three of 19 cells with different monetary amounts hidden underneath. The loser of the final gets to choose from a selection of prize items such as books or board games. The two finalists return to play in the next episode, unless a player has appeared five times in a row, in which case they do not come back but receive an AZ-kvíz t-shirt.

== Cultural impact ==
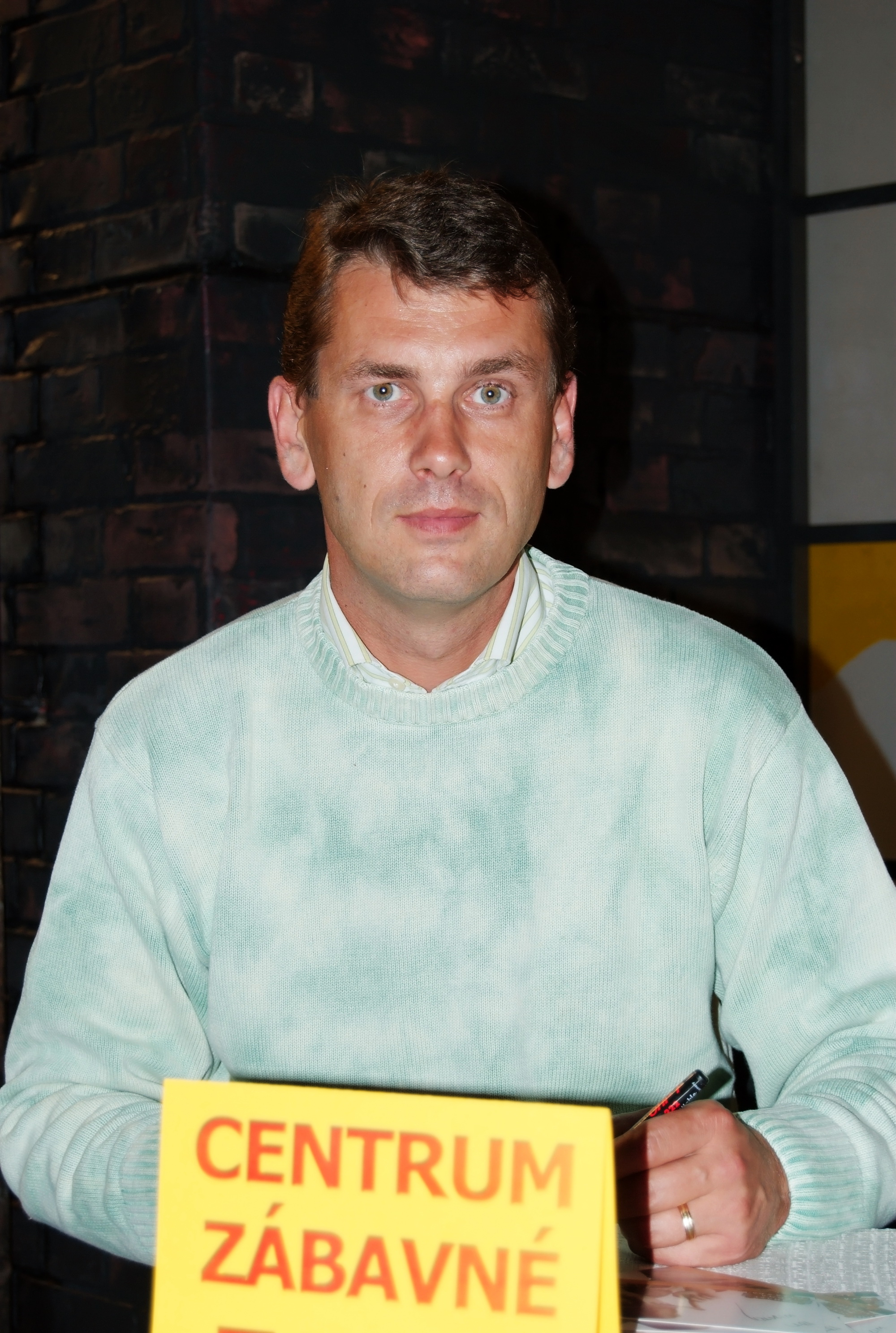
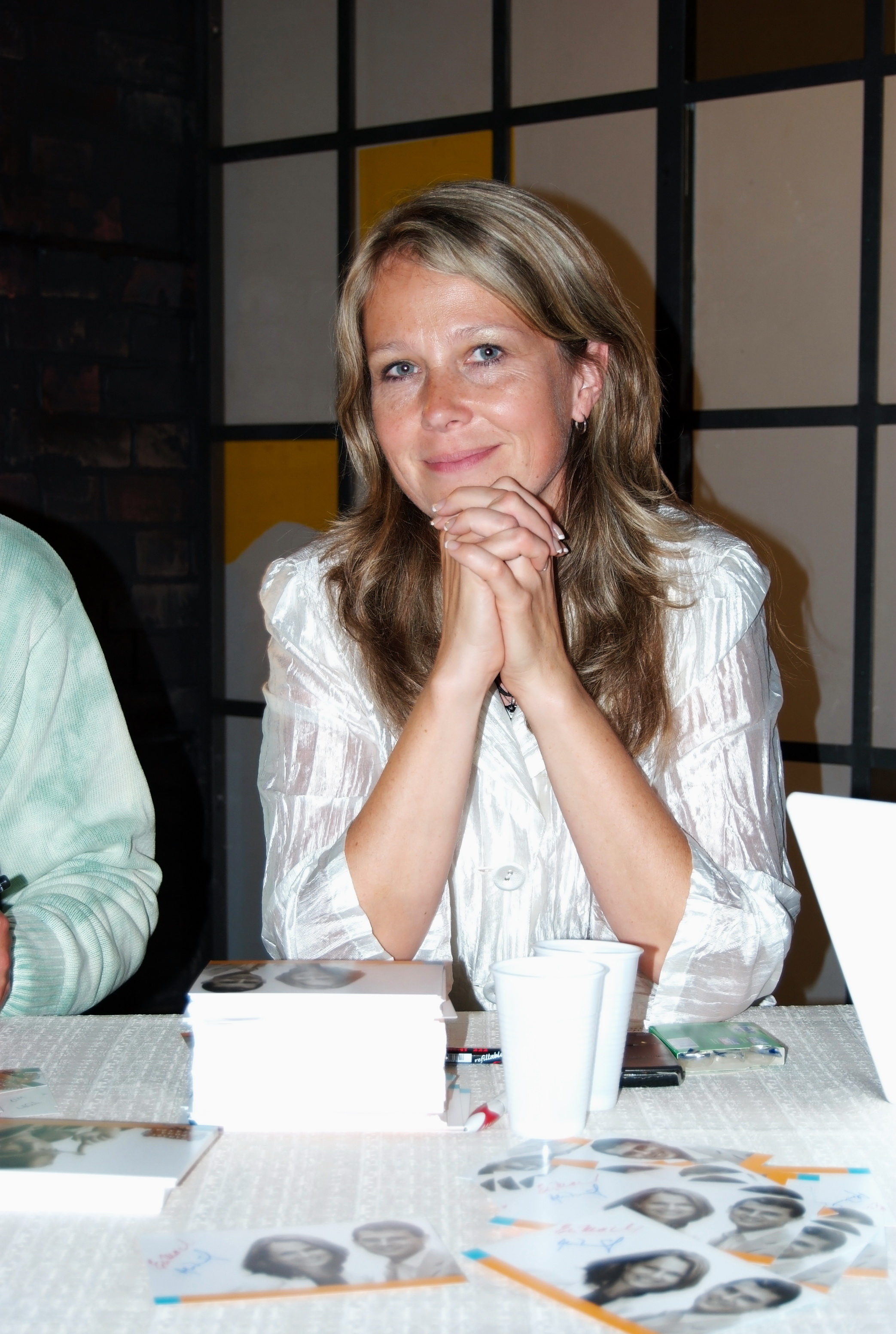
Hosts Aleš Zbořil and Eva Machourková

AZ-kvíz has been described as a Czech cultural phenomenon due to its longevity and high audience figures.

=== Notable contestants ===
Some contestants have gone on to become nationally famous due to their appearances, including:

- Ladislav Zibura, a travel writer who intentionally chose the farthest possible cells from each other in order to lose on purpose, including all three corners of the triangle. He appeared on the show to promote his new book.
- Marcela Niklová, a forest cultivation worker ("pěstební dělnice") who attracted national attention due to her unusual job and became the subject of many internet parodies. She was memorably associated with her hobby of collecting elephant figurines ("sbírám figurky slonů").
- Petr Opršal, a political science student famous for two episodes. In the first, he achieved the very rare feat of winning the lowest amount possible in the ATM round (1,100 CZK). In the second, he confidently stated Charles I of Austria was the successor of "Franz Joseph II" instead of Franz Joseph I, losing him the game, and his anguished reaction after his opponent humorously corrected him went viral.

== Variants ==
There is a version for children called AZ kvíz junior. Special celebrity editions have also been broadcast.
