= Místo zločinu Zlín =

- Genre: Crime
- Created by: Josef Viewegh
- Written by: Tomáš Koňařík; Zdeněk Zapletal; Martin Bezouška; Tomáš Chvála
- Directed by: Jiří Chlumský; Jan Hřebejk; Martin Kopp
- Starring: Radek Holub; Jitka Schneiderová; Andrea Mohylová; Daniel Krejčík; Igor Bareš
- Country of origin: Czech Republic
- Original language: Czech
- No. of seasons: 1
- No. of episodes: 12

Production
- Producers: Martin Froyda; Jan Lekeš
- Cinematography: Juraj Dobrakov
- Editors: Marek Opatrný; Vladimír Barák; Michal Lánský
- Running time: 60 minutes

Original release
- Network: ČT1
- Release: January 5, 2026

Related
- Místo zločinu Plzeň; Místo zločinu Ostrava; Místo zločinu České Budějovice

Místo zločinu Zlín is a crime drama series by Czech Television. The creators based their work on real criminal cases that took place in the Zlín region. Real cases that served inspiration for the series include the Heating oil case or 2012 Czech Republic methanol poisonings.

The main roles in the series were played by Radek Holub, Jitka Schneiderová, Andrea Mohylová, Daniel Krejčík and Igor Bareš. This is another series of the Czech Television crime series Místo zločinu; this series is connected to the previous series Místo zločinu České Budějovice by the character of Lucie Veselá (Jitka Schneiderová), who heads from České Budějovice to Zlín.

The first episode of the series premiered on ČT1 on January 5, 2026, in prime time.

== Cast ==
=== Main ===
- Radek Holub as mjr. Josef Ptáčník, šéf mordparty
- Jitka Schneiderová as mjr. Mgr. Lucie Veselá, deputy of Josef Ptáčník, former state prosecutor
- Andrea Mohylová as kpt. Marta Benešová
- Daniel Krejčík as Vojtěch Černý, operative
- Igor Bareš as plk. Vladimír Terč

== Production ==
The series was filmed mainly in the Zlín region and three directors participated in the series, Jan Hřebejk, Martin Kopp and Jiří Chlumský.

== Episodes ==
No. in series	Title	Directed by	Written by	Original air date	Czech viewers (millions)
1	"Baráž"	Jiří Chlumský	Tomáš Chvála	January 5, 2026	1.350
2	"Dlouhá cesta"	Jan Hřebejk	Tomáš Koňařík	January 12, 2026	1.255
3	"Nenávist"	Jan Hřebejk	Tomáš Chvála	January 19, 2026	N/A
4	"Déjà vu"	Jiří Chlumský	Tomáš Koňařík	January 26, 2026	N/A
5	"El Paso"	Unknown	Unknown	February 2, 2026	N/A
6	"Lest"	Unknown	Unknown	February 9, 2026	N/A
7	"Amulet"	Unknown	Unknown	February 16, 2026	N/A
8	"Baťův odkaz"	Unknown	Unknown	February 23, 2026	N/A
9	"Tanečnice"	Unknown	Unknown	March 2, 2026	N/A
10	"Pozdní sběr"	Unknown	Unknown	March 9, 2026	N/A
11	"Smrt aktivisty"	Unknown	Unknown	March 16, 2026	N/A
12	"Poklad na jezeře"	Unknown	Unknown	March 23, 2026	N/A
