= Shadow Country (film) =

2020 Czech historical drama film

- Film poster
- Directed by: Bohdan Sláma
- Written by: Ivan Arsenjev
- Starring: Magdaléna Borová, Stanislav Majer
- Distributed by: Bontonfilm
- Release date: 12 August 2020
- Running time: 135 minutes
- Country: Czech Republic
- Language: Czech
- Budget: 56 million CZK

Shadow Country (Czech: Krajina ve stínu) is a 2020 Czech historical drama film directed by Bohdan Sláma. It is inspired by Tušť massacre from May 1945. It chronicles life of a small village from 1930s to 1950s. The film premiered at the 2020 Summer Film School Uherské Hradiště and is set to release to theatres on 10 September 2020. The film won six Czech Lion Awards including Best Actress, Best Supporting Actress, and Best Screenplay.

== Cast ==
- Magdaléna Borová as Veberová
- Stanislav Majer as Veber
- Barbora Poláková as Marta Lišková
- Csongor Kassai as Josef Pachl
- Petra Špalková
- Zuzana Kronerová
- Pavel Nový
- Cyril Drozda
- Marek Taclík
