= Zrádci =

- Genre: Crime, Thriller
- Directed by: Viktor Tauš, Matěj Chlupáček
- Starring: Cyril Dobrý
- Country of origin: Czech Republic
- Original language: Czech
- No. of seasons: 1
- No. of episodes: 6

Production
- Running time: 70 minutes

Original release
- Network: ČT1
- Release: 23 February – 29 March 2020

Zrádci (Rats) is a Czech crime thriller television series broadcast on Czech Television in 2020. The series had its gala premiere in September 2019 at the Serial Killer festival in Brno, Czechia.

== Plot ==
The story of the shows three weeks in the life of a drug dealer and police informant David Frýdl, who is part of the Czecho-Vietnamese drug mafia. After the murder of his police liaison, he is left alone with both sides at his throat — the police and the mafia — and he searches for a way to save his life.

== Cast ==
- Cyril Dobrý as David Frýdl
- Lenka Krobotová as kpt. Petra Vávrová
- Miloslav Pecháček as René
- Martin Havelka as plk. Ivan Mach
- Hoang Anh Doan as Doan
- David Novotný as mjr. Lukás Vávra
- Igor Bareš as Krejsa
- Magdaléna Borová as Blažková
- Anežka Novotná as Tereza Vávrová

== Reception ==
Series has won 2 Gold Kingfisher awards at Finále Plzeň Film Festival for the best TV Project - one from film critic jury and one from Student Jury. It also won Czech Lion Award for Best TV Series.
