= Vydrýsek =

- Written by: Jana Flašková; Václav Chaloupek
- Directed by: Václav Chaloupek
- Starring: Viktor Preiss (narrator)
- Composer: Samson Lenk
- Country of origin: Czech Republic
- Original language: Czech
- No. of seasons: 1
- No. of episodes: 13

Production
- Running time: 7-10 minutes

Original release
- Network: Czech Television
- Release: 5 January – 17 January 2003

Vydrýsek is a Czech television series filmed in 2001 and 2002 and first broadcast as part of the evening program in January 2003.

The series is part of a cycle series of natural history stories that Václav Chaloupek invented and realized for Czech Television. Each series was dedicated to a different animal species.

The filming was done by a group of cameramen led by Jiří Bálek, others were František Čech, Oldřich Mikulica, Aleš Toman and Radek Všetečka. The music was composed by Jaroslav Samson Lenk, the series was narrated by Viktor Preiss. 13 episodes were filmed, ranging from about 7 to 10 minutes.

== Synopsis ==
The main character is a small river otter from Station Pavlov, named Vydrýsek. The series shows first year of Vydrýsek's life and shows various events and adventures happening to him during that time.

== Episodes ==
1. O vydřím setkání
2. O neposlušném synkovi
3. O děravé kleci
4. O cizí řece
5. O ježatém neplavci
6. O výřím nebezpečí
7. O návštěvě na dvoře
8. O králi ptactva
9. O setkání s čuňaty
10. O blátivých stopách
11. O opravdovém nebezpečí
12. O šumavském bloudění
13. O příchodu zimy
