= Méďové =

- Directed by: Václav Chaloupek
- Starring: Václav Chaloupek
- Composer: Jaroslav Samson Lenk
- Country of origin: Czech Republic
- Original language: Czech
- No. of seasons: 2
- No. of episodes: 29

Production
- Running time: 8-9 minutes

Original release
- Network: Czech Television
- Release: 22 January 2001 – 6 January 2005

Méďové is a Czech television series filmed in 2000, first broadcast as part of an evening program in January 2001. After several years, in 2003, a second season was filmed, loosely connected, also known as Méďové II – Povídání pro Aničku. It was broadcast at the turn of 2004 and 2005.

The series is part of a cycle series of natural history stories that Václav Chaloupek invented and realized for Czech Television. Each series was dedicated to a different animal species.

The camera was secured by Jiří Bálek in cooperation with his colleagues. The music was composed by Jaroslav Samson Lenk including the lyrics, Tomáš Töpfer narrated the story in season 1. A total of 29 episodes were filmed, lasting between approx. 8 and 9 minutes.

In 2013 Chaloupek filmed continuation series Méďové na cestách.

== Synopsis ==
The main characters are three little bear cubs, Kuba, Vojta and Matěj, who lost their mother and had to be taken care of by a person - the photographer Václav, with whom they experience various incidents...

The second series takes viewers to the celebration of their third birthday, when their "adoptive father", photographer Václav, learns on a visit to Beroun that two little bear cubs have been born at the castle in Český Krumlov, which the mother does not seem interested in...

== Cast ==
- Václav Chaloupek as photographer Václav
- Tomáš Töpfer as narrator (season 1)
- Josef Dvořák as narrator (season 2)

== Episodes ==
=== Season 1 ===
1. Překvapení v polomu
2. Nový domov
3. První vycházky
4. Na tetřívčím tokaništi
5. Když taje sníh
6. Nebojácný tetřev
7. Jarní den
8. V kraji houpavých mechů
9. Cesta za sluncem
10. Výlet k řece
11. Ve skalním bludišti
12. Za posledním sněhem
13. Srnčí tajemství
14. Toulání v rákosí
15. Letní setkání
16. Loučení

=== Season 2 ===
1. Méďové se rodí v lednu
2. Šumavské klouzání
3. Čas kvetoucích strání
4. Výlet do nemocného lesa
5. Brdské toulání
6. Když je horko v kožichu
7. Medvědí občerstvení
8. Pásli ovce Valaši
9. Cestami medvědů
10. V kraji vyhaslých sopek
11. Dobrodružství ve skalách
12. Medvědí express
13. Okolo Třeboně
