= Dabing Street =

- Genre: Comedy
- Directed by: Petr Zelenka
- Starring: Hynek Čermák; Klára Melíšková; Václav Neužil; Tereza Voříšková; Marek Adamczyk
- Country of origin: Czech Republic
- Original language: Czech
- No. of seasons: 1
- No. of episodes: 12

Production
- Running time: 31 minutes

Original release
- Network: Czech Television
- Release: January 9 – March 26, 2018

Dabing Street is a Czech comedy TV series. The plot is set in the summer of 2001 and describes what happens in a fictional dubbing company Studio ZERO after its owner dies. His widow takes over the company and tries to share the management of the studio with the employees.

The series is based on the play of the same name by Dejvické Theatre, which won the title of Best Comedy of 2013 at the XIV. of the Grand Festival of Laughter in Pardubice. The actors of the Dejvické Theatre are therefore cast in most roles. Several well-known actors were cast in "civilian" roles playing themselves (e.g. cameo of Filip Švarek, Jiří Bartoška, Viktor Preiss). The dubbed foreign language scenes are not from actual films, but were filmed specifically for the series. It was a TV series debut for director Petr Zelenka.

== Cast ==
- Klára Melíšková as Eva Archová, studio co-owner, unsuccessful actress
- Hynek Čermák as Karel Bartoš, oldest technician and loyal employee
- Václav Neužil as Pavel Vlas, technician, Eva's lover
- Tereza Voříšková as Lada Bartošová, cleaning lady and Karel's sister
- Marek Adamczyk as David, youngest technician
