= Magdaléna Borová =

Czech actress

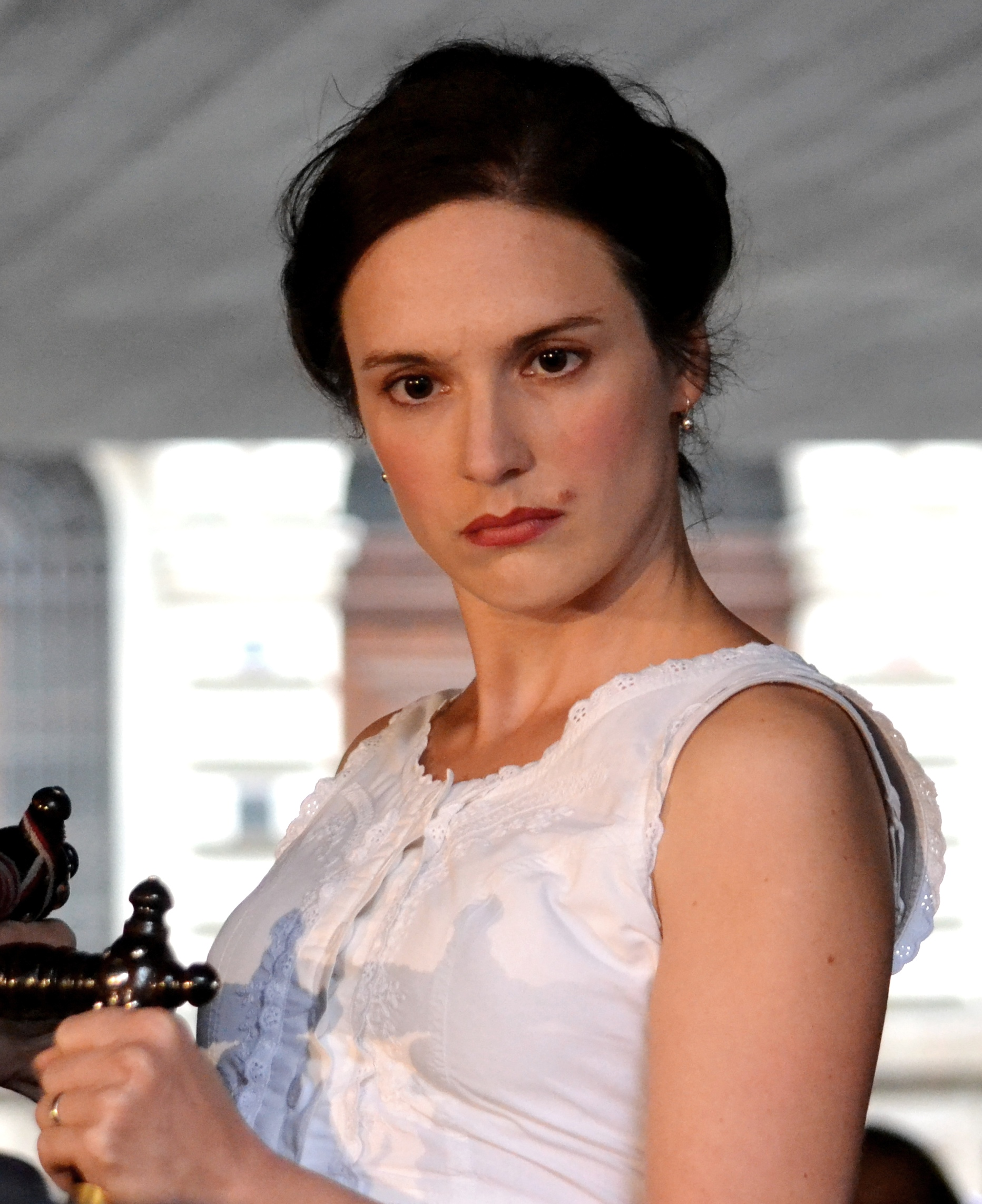
- Borová in 2014
- Born: 14 April 1981 (age 45); Frýdlant, Czechoslovakia
- Education: Academy of Performing Arts in Prague
- Occupation: Actress
- Years active: 2005–present
- Spouse: Miloslav König
- Children: 2

Magdaléna Borová (born 14 April 1981) is a Czech actress.

Borová graduated from Academy of Performing Arts in Prague in 2005, after which she joined the National Theatre in Prague. She appeared in the movie Hrubeš a Mareš jsou kamarádi do deště and in two TV films produced by Czech Television. She received the Alfréd Radok Award in the category Talent of the Year.

== Notable performances ==
- 2006 – Thomasina Coverly in Arcadia, Czech National Theatre
- 2005 – Marcela in The Dog in the Manger by Lope de Vega, Czech National Theatre
- 2004 – Helena in All's Well That Ends Well, Klicpera's Theatre in Hradec Králové
- 2003 – Daughter in The Shameless by Koffi Kwahulé, DISK

== Cinema ==
- 2020 – Veberová in Shadow Country, Czech film: Krajina ve stínu by Bohdan Sláma)
- 2016 – Me, Olga Hepnarová
- 2009 – Hrubeš and Mareš reloaded
- 2009 – My husband's wife
- 2005 – Hrubeš and Mareš are Friends to the Rain
- 2005 – Fairy Tale about Violin and Viola (TV film)
- 2003 – Maryška (TV film)
