= Actor (miniseries) =

- Genre: Drama
- Written by: Petr Bok, Pavel Gotthard
- Directed by: Peter Bebjak
- Starring: Jan Cina
- Country of origin: Czech Republic
- Original language: Czech
- No. of seasons: 1
- No. of episodes: 3

Production
- Running time: 76 minutes

Original release
- Network: ČT1
- Release: October 11 – October 25, 2020

Herec (English: Actor) is a Czech drama television series directed by Peter Bebjak. It is set in Czechoslovakia in the 1950s.

The title role in the series, the young actor Stanislav Láník, is played by Jan Cina. Láník finds himself in a difficult situation: State Security takes advantage of his homosexuality and uses him as bait to compromise influential figures, in exchange for help with his acting career. Jenovéfa Boková, Emília Vášáryová, Martin Finger and Adrian Jastraban also star in the series.

The three-part series was broadcast every Sunday evening on the ČT1 channel from 11 to 25 October 2020.

== Cast ==
- Jan Cina as Standa Láník
- Jenovéfa Boková as Anežka Láníková, Standa's sister
- Emília Vášáryová as Božena Hrubá, Standa's and Anežka's grandmother
- Martin Finger as Captain Jindřich Korčák, StB officer
- Adrian Jastraban as Karel Štěpánský, landlord and Communist
- Jan Nedbal as Zdeněk Špork, Anežka's fiancée
- Luboš Veselý as Professor Viktor Hél
- Pavel Batěk as Colonel Vladimír Kempný
- Elizaveta Maximová as Marta Švarcová, actress
- Judit Bárdos as Eva Doležalová, amateur actress
- Alexander Bárta as Daneš
- Julius Oračko as Farkaš
- Vasil Fridrich as Vaněk
- Jevgenij Libezňuk as Colonel Blochin
- Lukáš Latinák as Pasák
- Dana Černá as secretary
- Jiří Šimek as Karel Semerád

== Episodes ==
No.	Title	Directed by	Written by	Original release date	Czech viewers (millions)
1	"Herec"	Peter Bebjak	Petr Bok, Pavel Gotthard	October 11, 2020	0.728
2	"Herec"	Peter Bebjak	Petr Bok, Pavel Gotthard	October 18, 2020	0.763
3	"Herec"	Peter Bebjak	Petr Bok, Pavel Gotthard	October 25, 2020	0.673

== Reception ==
=== Awards and nominations ===
The series was nominated for the prestigious TV award Prix Europa alongside well-known European series such as My Brilliant Friend or Caliphate.

In January 2021, the series was nominated for the Czech Film Critics' Award in the non-cinema category. In the same month, the Czech Film and Television Academy also announced the nominations for the Czech Lions. The series received 7 nominations in the following categories: best actress in a leading role (Jenovéfa Boková), best actor in a leading role (Jan Cina), best actress in a supporting role (Elizaveta Maximová), best screenplay (Petr Bok and Pavel Gotthard), best cinematography (Martin Žiaran), best editing (Marek Kráľovský) and best television film or miniseries. It has won in best television film or miniseries category.
