= Čapkovy kapsy =

- Genre: Crime; Comedy
- Directed by: Jan Chramosta; Jan Těšitel; Vojtěch Moravec; Martin Kopp; Slobodanka Radun; Daniel Maráky; Rozálie Kohoutová; Jan Vejnar; Zdeněk Durdil; Josef Tuka; Jana Boršková; Jan Míka ml.
- Starring: Ondřej Pšenička; Oldřich Vízner; Karel Heřmánek; Jiří Strach; Tomáš Töpfer; Johanna Tesařová; František Němec; Václav Postránecký; Viktor Preiss; Naďa Konvalinková; Kateřina Burianová
- Country of origin: Czech Republic
- Original language: Czech
- No. of seasons: 1
- No. of episodes: 12

Production
- Running time: 19-41 minutes

Original release
- Network: Czech Television
- Release: September 4 – September 25, 2011

Čapkovy kapsy (Čapek's Pockets) is a Czech crime comedy television series. It is a cycle of 12 short stories by Czech Television based on the stories of Karel Čapek. Each episode was directed by a different director.

== Cast ==
Básník

- Ondřej Pšenička as poet
- Karel Heřmánek as dr. Vejřík
- Jiří Strach as constable No. 141
- Johana Tesařová as landlady
- Kateřina Burianová-Rajmontová as beggar
- Jakub Albrecht as student Králík
- Hana Baroňová as fiancée

Zmizení herce Bendy

- Tomáš Töpfer as doctor Goldberg
- Viktor Preiss as actor Benda
- Jaroslav Satoranský as actor Lebduška
- Jiří Štěpnička as Korbel
- Václav Postránecký as Hejtman
- Naďa Konvalinková as Marešová
- Dana Batulková as nurse
- Václav Sloup as district medician
- Pavlína Mourková as neighbour Kalousková
- Petr Janiš as chamberlain Korbela
- Radim Kalvoda as director
- Václav Knop as doorman DNV
- Oldřich Hrůza as waiter
- Karla Klimtová as inspicient Barešová
- Monika Timková as actress
- Isabela Balonová as actress
- Monika Fingerová as actress
- Jan Vondráček as policeman
- Lukáš Homola as policeman
- Miroslav Večerka as caretaker

Jasnovidec

- Martin Myšička as JUDr. Klapka
- Jan Hrušínský as Janowitz
- Manita Krausová as housekeeper Nováčková
- František Němec as judge
- Oldřich Vízner as barber
- Martin Kraus as barber assistant
- Ladislav Hampl as prince Karadagh
- Miroslav Šnajdr as drunk
- Marek Dobeš as policeman
- Pavel Hasmuk as judicial guard
- Lukáš Křišťan as civilian

Zločin na poště

- Oldřich Navrátil as sergeant Burda
- Dana Marková as Helenka Pivoňková
- Lucie Polišenská as Julie Tauferová
- Pavel Rímský as Tauferová Julie
- Karel Zima as postman Uher
- Milena Steinmasslová as Kopřivová
- Martin Hofman as controller
- Michal Novotný as assistant professor Houdek

== Episodes ==
1. Básník, directed by Jan Chramosta
2. Zmizení herce Bendy, directed by Vojtěch Moravec
3. Jasnovidec, directed by Jan Těšitel
4. Zločin na poště, directed by Martin Kopp
5. Soud pana Havleny, directed by Jan Míka ml.
6. Muž, který se nelíbil, directed by Slobodanka Raduň
7. Závrať, directed by Daniel Maráky
8. Příběh sňatkového podvodníka, directed by Rozálie Kohoutová
9. O lyrickém zloději, directed by Jan Vejnar
10. Ztracený dopis, directed by Zdeněk Durdil
11. Případy pana Janíka, directed by Josef Tuka
12. Zločin v chalupě, directed by Jana Boršková
