= Șumna =

- Commune
- Location within Moldova
- Coordinates: 47.9166666667°N 27.7°E
- Country: Moldova
- District: Rîșcani District

Government
  - Mayor: Antonina Șarban

Population (2014)
  - Total: 485
- Time zone: UTC+2 (EET)
  - Summer (DST): UTC+3 (EEST)

Șumna is a commune in Rîșcani District, Moldova. It is composed of three villages: Bulhac, Cepăria and Șumna.
