= Podezření =

- Directed by: Michal Blaško
- Starring: Klára Melíšková; Denisa Barešová; Miroslav Hanuš; Ivan Trojan
- Countries of origin: Czech Republic; France
- Original language: Czech
- No. of seasons: 1
- No. of episodes: 3

Production
- Running time: 66–73 minutes

Original release
- Network: ČT1
- Release: March 13 – March 27, 2022

Podezření (English: Suspicion) is 2022 Czech-French drama television series by Czech Television. Before its broadcast, it was shown at Karlovy Vary International Film Festival and at the Serial Killer festival, where Klára Melíšková received a special mention from the jury for her performance.

Thanks to its screening at the international Serial Killer festival in Brno, the series was selected for the competition section of the Berlinale festival. It is the first Czech series to do so.

== Plot ==
Hardworking and cold Nurse Hana Kučerová is suspected of murdering her patient. Her co-workers point to her as the natural suspect acting from their own motivations and prejudices.

== Cast ==
- Klára Melíšková as nurse Hana Kučerová
- Denisa Barešová as Hana's daughter Tereza
- Miroslav Hanuš as defense attorney Novák
- Ivan Trojan as Dalibor Vaculík
- Elizaveta Maximová as Larisa Klimenková
- Marek Pospíchal as detective Berka
- Petr Lněnička as hospital director Karel Kříž
- Milena Steinmasslová as chief nurse Jarošová

== Episodes ==
No.	Title	Directed by	Written by	Original release date	Czech viewers (millions)
1	"Podezření"	Michal Blaško	Štěpán Hulík	March 13, 2022	1.209
2	"Podezření"	Michal Blaško	Štěpán Hulík	March 20, 2022	1.194
3	"Podezření"	Michal Blaško	Štěpán Hulík	March 27, 2022	1.270
