= Šumná města =

- Genre: Documentary
- Directed by: Radovan Lipus
- Starring: David Vávra
- Country of origin: Czech Republic
- Original language: Czech
- No. of episodes: 66

Production
- Running time: 25 minutes

Original release
- Network: Czech Television
- Release: 1995 – 8 December 2008

Related
- Šumné stopy

Šumná města is a Czech documentary series, broadcast during period 1995–2008 by Czech Television. It is about the modern architecture of Czech cities. The author and director was Radovan Lipus, with whom David Vávra, who accompanied the entire cycle as a commenting architect, did not get along on the script.

In 1995 and 1996, separate documentaries Šumná Ostrava, Šumná Opava and Šumná Olomouc were filmed. In 1999, the project took the form of a television series, but in 2004, filming of the cycle was temporarily interrupted due to austerity measures at Czech Television. Filming was later continued and the entire cycle ended with the last 66th episode of Šumné Brno in 2008. The entire series was then followed by a similar cycle Šumná stopa, which focused on the work of Czech architects abroad. A shorter bonus episode Šumná Šumná, which parodied the cycle by filming in the village of Šumná, also appeared on the screens of Czech Television.

== Episodes ==
1. Šumný Krnov
2. Šumný Špindlerův Mlýn
3. Šumný Radhošť
4. Šumný Nový Jičín
5. Šumný Šumperk
6. Šumný Děčín
7. Šumný Prostějov
8. Šumný Těšín
9. Šumné Hranice
10. Šumný Zlín
11. Šumný Frýdek-Místek
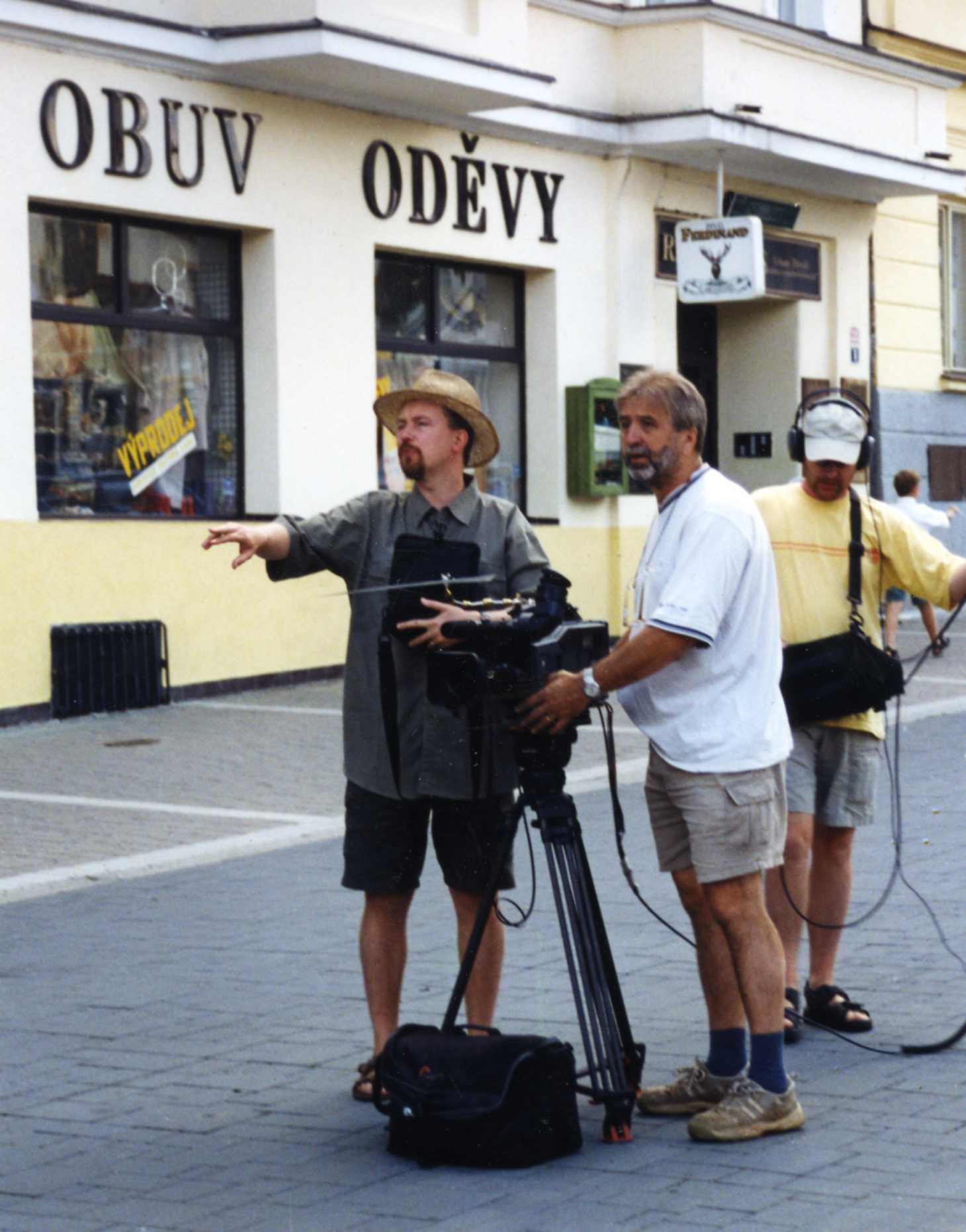
12. Director Lipus and rest of crew shooting episode Šumný Benešov.
  Šumné Ústí nad Labem
13. Šumná Orlice
14. Šumná Mladá Boleslav
15. Šumné Karvinsko
16. Šumný Náchod
17. Šumné Louny
18. Šumné České Budějovice
19. Šumný Hradec Králové
20. Šumný Český ráj
21. Šumné Pardubice
22. Šumné Poděbrady
23. Šumné Pelhřimovsko
24. Šumný Kolín
25. Šumné Teplice
26. Šumné Kladno
27. Šumný Jablonec nad Nisou
28. Šumné Karlovy Vary
29. Šumný Liberec
30. Šumný Nymburk
31. Šumný Most a Litvínov
32. Šumná Ostrava
33. Šumná Opava
34. Šumná Olomouc
35. Šumná Plzeň
36. Šumná Kroměříž
37. Šumný Benešov
38. Šumné Polabí
39. Šumné Valašsko
40. Šumný Jiráskův kraj
41. Šumné Slovácko
42. Šumný Cheb
43. Šumné Berounsko
44. Šumné Třebové
45. Šumná Litomyšl
46. Šumný Trutnov
47. Šumná Otava
48. Šumná Jihlava
49. Šumný Tábor
50. Šumné Znojmo
51. Šumná Příbram
52. Šumná Šumava
53. Šumný Rakovník
54. Šumný Přerov
55. Šumná Polička a Svitavy
56. Šumný Praděd
57. Šumné Domažlice a Klatovy
58. Šumné Horácko
59. Šumná Chrudim
60. Šumná Jizera
61. Šumná Česká Lípa a Nový Bor
62. Šumná Vysočina
63. Šumná Česká Kanada
64. Šumný Moravský kras
65. Šumný Tachov
66. Šumné Brno

== Odkazy ==
=== Literatura ===
- Šumná města. Petrov, Druhé město. ISBN 80-7227-125-3.

=== External links ===
- Official website
- Šumná města at IMDb
