= Janek Rubeš =

Czech vlogger and journalist

Jan Rubeš
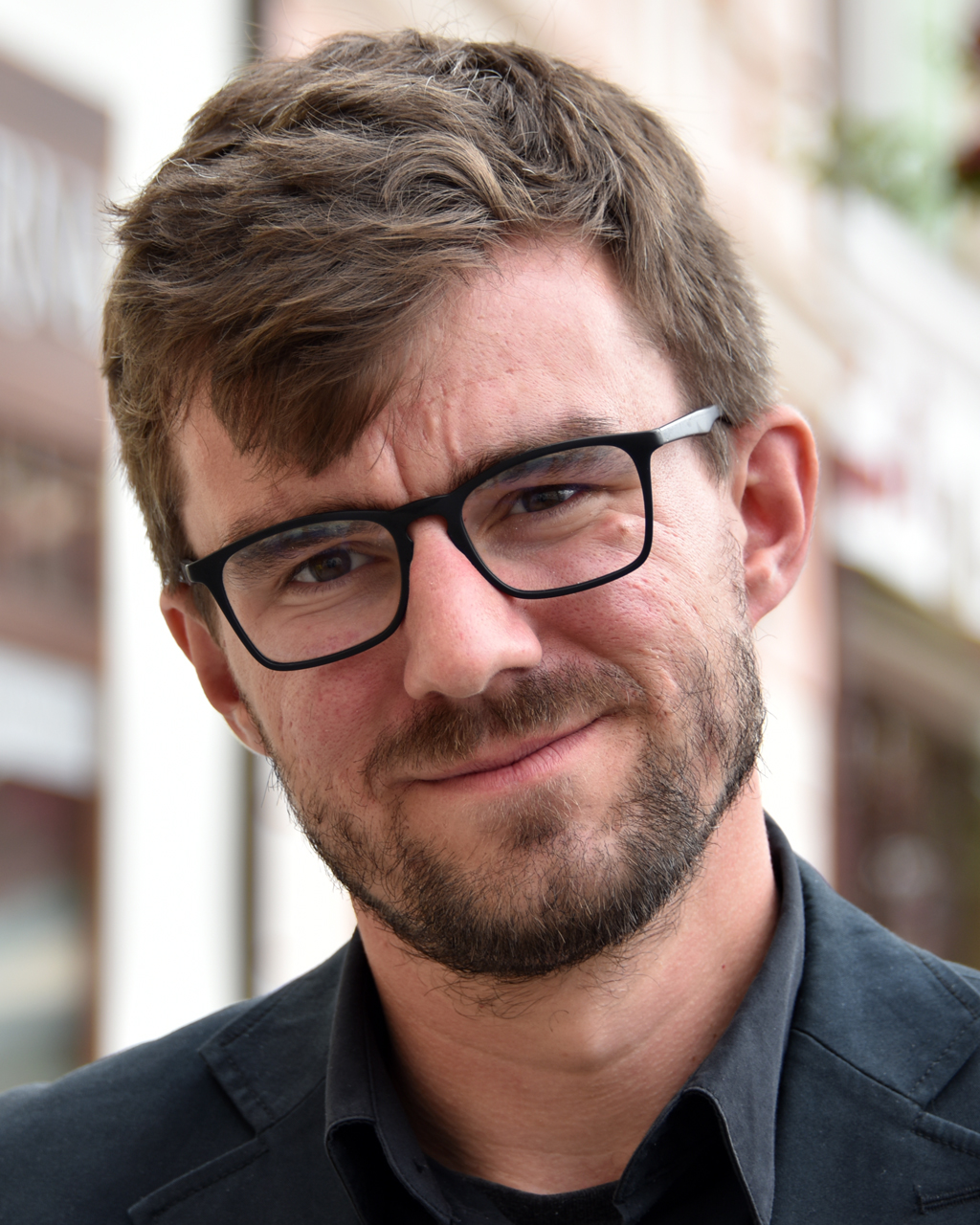
- Rubeš in 2019
- Born: Jan Rubeš; 24 December 1987 (age 38); Prague, Czechoslovakia
- Education: Film School in Písek, Tomas Bata University in Zlín
- Occupation: YouTuber

YouTube information
- Channel: Honest Guide
- Years active: 2015–present
- Subscribers: 1.85 million
- Views: 265.6 million
- Last updated: 23 January 2026
- Website: honest.blog

Jan Rubeš (born 24 December 1987), better known as Janek Rubeš, is a Czech reporter, documentarist, vlogger, tour guide and director. He is mainly known for the YouTube channel Honest Guide, which he runs with his cameraman Honza Mikulka. The channel provides tips for tourists, including tips on how to avoid tourist traps and scams in many cities, mainly Prague.

In 2016 the Czech edition of Forbes featured Rubeš in their 30 under 30 list: 30 of the most talented Czechs under 30 years old. In 2019, he won the Novinářská křepelka (Journalist Quail), awarded to young journalists under the Cena Karla Havlíčka Borovského award of Karel Havlíček Borovský for his investigative and brave journalism. The British newspaper The Independent named him and Honza Mikulka "the patron saints of Prague tourism".

== Personal life and education ==
Rubeš studied at Film School in Písek and Tomas Bata University in Zlín. His father, Jan Rubeš, is known for his work in television production and film distribution. Rubeš is married and the couple has a child.

== Career ==
In 2006, Rubeš filmed viral videos as part of a duo called Noisebrothers with Jindra Malík. The same year, he joined the Czech internet television channel Stream.cz, for which he created a number of successful programs, including How to Do It, NBN, Life in Luxury, City of Scams?, and Prague vs. Crooks. In Prague vs. Crooks (2015), he documented organized crime in Prague. For example, he captured taxi drivers scamming tourists by charging them many times the normal price. He was also a cameraman for the architecture series Gebrian versus and Jídlo s.r.o..

In 2018, he left Stream.cz and joined the newly emerging Czech news channel Seznam Zprávy, which is under ownership of the Czech internet portal and company Seznam.cz. Between 2018 and 2019, he hosted the talkshow V centru (In The Centre), of which he was the writer.

On 13 January 2026, Rubeš was awarded the Ď Award for moral role model and exemplary personality.

=== Honest Guide ===
Since 2016, he has published his most popular series Honest Guide with his cameraman friend Honza Mikulka on YouTube. It is filmed in English. The channel provides tips for tourists, including tips on how to avoid tourist traps and scams in many cities, mainly Prague. They have also filmed in multiple cities in the Czech Republic (such as Český Krumlov, Pardubice, and Brno) and abroad (New York City, Kraków, Innsbruck, Kyiv, and Tampere). As of February 2023, the YouTube channel has more than 1 million subscribers and more than 117.8 million views. Many of the videos from the Honest Guide channel were deleted in March 2021 due to a copyright dispute. Janek Rubeš and Honza Mikulka were employed by TV Seznam until the end of 2020 and they shot the same videos from the Honest Guide for their employer. The videos for TV Seznam were in Czech, but the content was the same. On October 2, 2020, Rubeš and Mikulka created a new channel called Kluci z Prahy (English: Guys from Prague), which are all Honest Guide videos translated to Czech.

According to the Czech version of Forbes magazine, both YouTube channels earned them 22 million CZK (approx. US$1,051,411) from July 2024 to June 2025, made them 6th most paid YouTubers and streamers in the Czech Republic.

On 3 August 2025, Rubeš disclosed that he was facing legal action over a critical video about a restaurant near Prague Castle, titled How They Work Magic in a Prague Pub with Beer. The video shows beer being poured from plastic bottles despite signage and taps indicating a well-known beer brand. The restaurant owner had filed a lawsuit demanding the removal of the video, a public apology and financial compensation. In August, the dispute between Rubeš and restaurant owner Yvetta P. ended in a settlement. Rubeš published a explanatory post on YouTube and Facebook, Yvetta P. dropped her second lawsuit which she filled with the District Court for Prague 5.
