= Alena Šolcová =

Czech mathematician and science historian

- Born: 26 March 1950 (age 76)
- Education: Charles University; Czech Technical University in Prague
- Occupations: Mathematician, science historian

Alena Šolcová (born 26 March 1950) is a Czech mathematician and science historian. She is the founder of the Kepler Museum, an astronomy museum in Prague.

== Life and work ==
Between 1968 and 1973, Šolcová studied mathematics at the Faculty of Mathematics and Physics and Philosophy at Charles University. Between 2002 and 2005, she completed her doctoral studies in mathematics in Civil Engineering with the doctoral thesis titled Fermat's Ideas Revived in Mathematics Applied in Engineering, and in 2009 she completed her habilitation at the Czech Technical University in Prague, and was appointed associate professor in the field of applied mathematics.

Šolcová works at the Faculty of Information Technologies of the Czech Technical University in Prague, where she teaches mathematical logic and the history of mathematics and computer science. She also deals with logic, number theory, some numerical methods and the history of mathematics, computer science and astronomy. Since 1992, she has led the SEDMA seminar (Seminar for the History of Mathematics, Informatics and Astronomy) and the working group for the history of exact sciences HEXA. She was the initiator and founder of an astronomy museum, the Kepler Museum in Prague (after its establishment, the museum was managed by the Czech Astronomical Society, in operation from 2009 to 2017).

She initiated the establishment of commemorative plaques to Albert Einstein on Prague's Old Town Square and another to Austrian mathematician Johann Radon in Děčín, Czech Republic.

Šolcová is an honorary member of the Union of Czech Mathematicians and Physicists and has served as its chairman beginning in 2018. She is also a member of the editorial board of the Czechoslovak Journal for Physics. She remains an active member of the Czech Mathematical Society and the Czech Society for Cybernetics and Informatics, which provides expertise concerning issues in logic, probability and reasoning.

=== Honors ===
- The magic of numbers - From great discoveries to applications, Academia Praha, 2009, 2011, 2018 with co-authors Michal Křížek and Lawrence Somer, was awarded the Hlávká prize for scientific literature in 2010 (First prize).
- In 1998, the International Astronomical Union named planet No. 58682 Alenašolcová in her honor.

== Selected publications ==
- Šolcová, Alena, and Michał Křižek. "Fermat And Mersenne Numbers In Pepin's Test1." Demonstratio Mathematica 39, no. 4 (2006): 737–742.
- Křížek, Michal, Alena Šolcová, and Lawrence Somer. "Construction of Šindel sequences." Commentationes Mathematicae Universitatis Carolinae 48, no. 3 (2007): 373–388.
- Solcova, Alena, and Michal Krizek. "Vladimír Vand (1911–1968): Pioneer of Computational Methods in Crystallography." IEEE Annals of the History of Computing 33, no. 4 (2011): 38–44.
- Křížek, Michal, Lawrence Somer, and Alena Šolcová. From great discoveries in number theory to applications. Cham: Springer, 2021.
