= V centru =

- Genre: Talkshow
- Presented by: Nikola Čechová, Karel Kovář (Kovy), Janek Rubeš and Tomáš Verner
- Country of origin: Czech Republic
- No. of series: 1
- No. of episodes: 40

Production
- Editor: Filip Vícha

Original release
- Network: Televize Seznam
- Release: 2017 – 2018

V centru (translated as In The Centre) is a Czech TV show from 2018 and 2019. The format of the show was a talk show with guests, created in the presence of a live audience and was live streamed on Televize Seznam (Seznam TV) and on the Facebook profile of Seznam Zprávy. The presenters of the show were Nikola Čechová, Karel Kovář (artistic name Kovy), Janek Rubeš and Tomáš Verner. The programme targeted a young audience, for example by allowing viewers to ask the guests questions via the presenters' social networks.

The filming took place in the premises of the Skautský Institut (Scout Institute) on Old Town Square in Prague. In the first episode, the guest was Adriana Krnáčová, the then mayor of Prague, interviewed by Janek Rubeš. When she asked him how to deal with fraudulent taxi drivers at the Praha hlavní nádraží station, he replied that all he had to do was to dismantle the signposts with arrows to the taxi parking. Subsequently, the arrows were removed from the station. Other guests of the program were, among others, Dita Přikrylová, Erik Tabery, Josef Průša, Zdeněk Hřib and Petr Pavel.
