= New Game + (TV programme) =

2019 Czech TV program

- Genre: Entertainment
- Country of origin: Czech Republic
- No. of series: 1

Production
- Running time: 40 minutes

Original release
- Network: Televize Seznam
- Release: 21 March – 11 July 2019

New Game + is a cancelled Czech television programme hosted by Alžběta Trojanová and Mikoláš Tuček, broadcast in 2019 on Televize Seznam, focused on reviews, rankings, news, reports and interesting things from the gaming world.

The premiere episode was broadcast on Television Seznam on 21 March 2019. The weekly was broadcast every Thursday at 18.00 on Television Seznam, now only recaps of previous episodes are broadcast. It is archived on the online broadcast of Television Seznam and on Stream.cz. After the broadcast of the program, a live debate with the creators of the program Alžběta Trojanová and Mikoláš Tuček on followed the Twitch platform.

The show stopped airing in July 2019. The original information about a holiday hiatus changed in 2020 to the definitive cancellation of the show and a change of format to New +. The final episode aired on 11 July 2019, owing to declining ratings; the last episodes could not cross the 10,000 audience mark. In comparison, the first three episodes started with 30,000 viewers.

== Authors and Moderators ==
- Alžběta Trojanová previously worked as editor-in-chief of the server Hratelně.cz and host of the programme Re-play.
- Mikoláš Tuček performed in the programs such as Re-play, Game Page, SCORE live, Applikace and FRAG live. For several years, he was editor-in-chief of SCORE magazine.

== Editors ==
External editors led by Alžběta Trojanová participated in creation of individual sections. This includes Melichar Oravec (FlyGunCZ), Radek Starý (Sterakdary), Zuzana Cinková (Baty Alquawen), Jana Kilianová (megayuffie), Barbara Hacsi (barbarahacsi), Šárka Tmějová (still_not_sane), Petr Ciesarík (cisi82), Zbyněk Povolný (zypomann), Václav Pecháček (engiecz), Miroslav Ježek, Tomáš Baksa (bajtygame) and Michael Irišek (michaelirisek).

== Program sections ==
- Review
- Review +
- Interview with a guest
- Discussion
- TOP 5
- Competition
