= Hana Vagnerová =

Czech stage and television actress (born 1983)

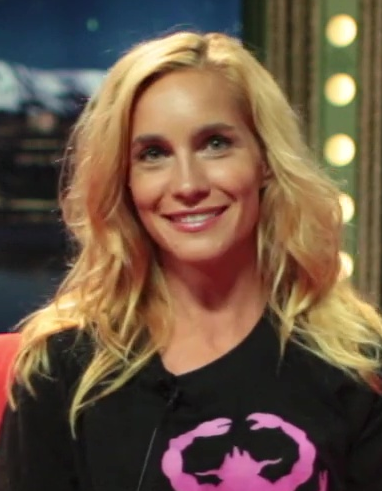
- Hana Vagnerová (2021)
- Born: 21 February 1983 (age 43); Prague, Czechoslovakia
- Occupation: Actress
- Years active: 2000–present
- Website: hanavagnerova.com

Hana Vagnerová (born 21 February 1983) is a Czech stage and television actress.

== Biography ==
She was born in 1983 in Prague, Czechoslovakia. She was raised in Prague's district Jižní Město. She began as a model. She studied at a Gymnasium and at the Theatrical Academy of Musical Arts.

== Filmography ==
=== Film ===
- Vyvraždění rodiny Greenů (2002) (TV)
- Seance Fiction (2003)
- Probuzená skála (2003) (TV)
- Pokus (2006) (TV)
- O Šípkové Růžence (2006) (TV)
- Aussig (2007), as Lenka Šimková
- Báthory (2007)
- Ďáblova lest (2008) (TV), as Iveta Runová
- Pohádkové počasí (2008) (TV)
- Hlasy za zdí (2011)
- A Vote for the King of the Romans (2016)
- Bikers (2017)
- Špindl 2 (2019)
- Snowing! (2019)
- Bet on Friendship (2021)
- Borders of Love (2022)
- A Murder Between Friends (2025)

=== Television ===
- Zdivočelá země (1997), as Miss Maděrová
- On je žena (2004), as Erika Maxová
- Horákovi (2006), as Eva Krátká
- Proč bychom se netopili (2009)
- Vyprávěj (2009–2013)
- Odsúdené (2009–2010)
- Organised Crime Unit (2011–2016), as Tereza Hodáčová
- Vraždy v kruhu (2015), as Sábina Borová
- Lajna (2017–2021), as Deniska

== Theatre ==
=== ABC Theatre ===
- České Vánoce .... Anča
- Anna Karenina .... Kitty Shchebackaya
- Miláček Ornifle .... Markéta
- Our Town .... Emilie Webb

=== Other stage works ===
- A Streetcar Named Desire .... Stella, Disko Theatre
- Bedbound .... girl with polio, A Studio Rubín
- Faust .... Markétka, A Studio Rubín
- Don Juan .... Elvira
- Oresteia .... Elektra
- Libertin .... Young Holbach
