= Alžběta Trojanová =

Czech journalist and television presenter

- Born: 16 January 1987 (age 38); Prague, Czechoslovakia
- Occupations: Journalist, television presenter
- Years active: 2004–present

Alžběta Trojanová (born 16 January 1987) is a Czech journalist and television presenter. Trojanová is known for cohosting the video game television program Re-play from 2011 to 2019.

== Early life ==
Trojanová was born in Prague in 1987. When she was young, Trojanová and her brother often played video games together on a Sega Mega Drive that they received when she was six years old. Every week, her father would take her to a games bazaar close to his barracks to sell their old games and buy new ones. When she was older, she enjoyed games like Heroes of Might and Magic and Hexen.

Trojanová began her career writing for the now-defunct Czech version of GameStar magazine in 2004. She studied at Charles University, where she received a degree in marketing communication and public relations in 2011 and a master's degree in media studies.

== Career ==
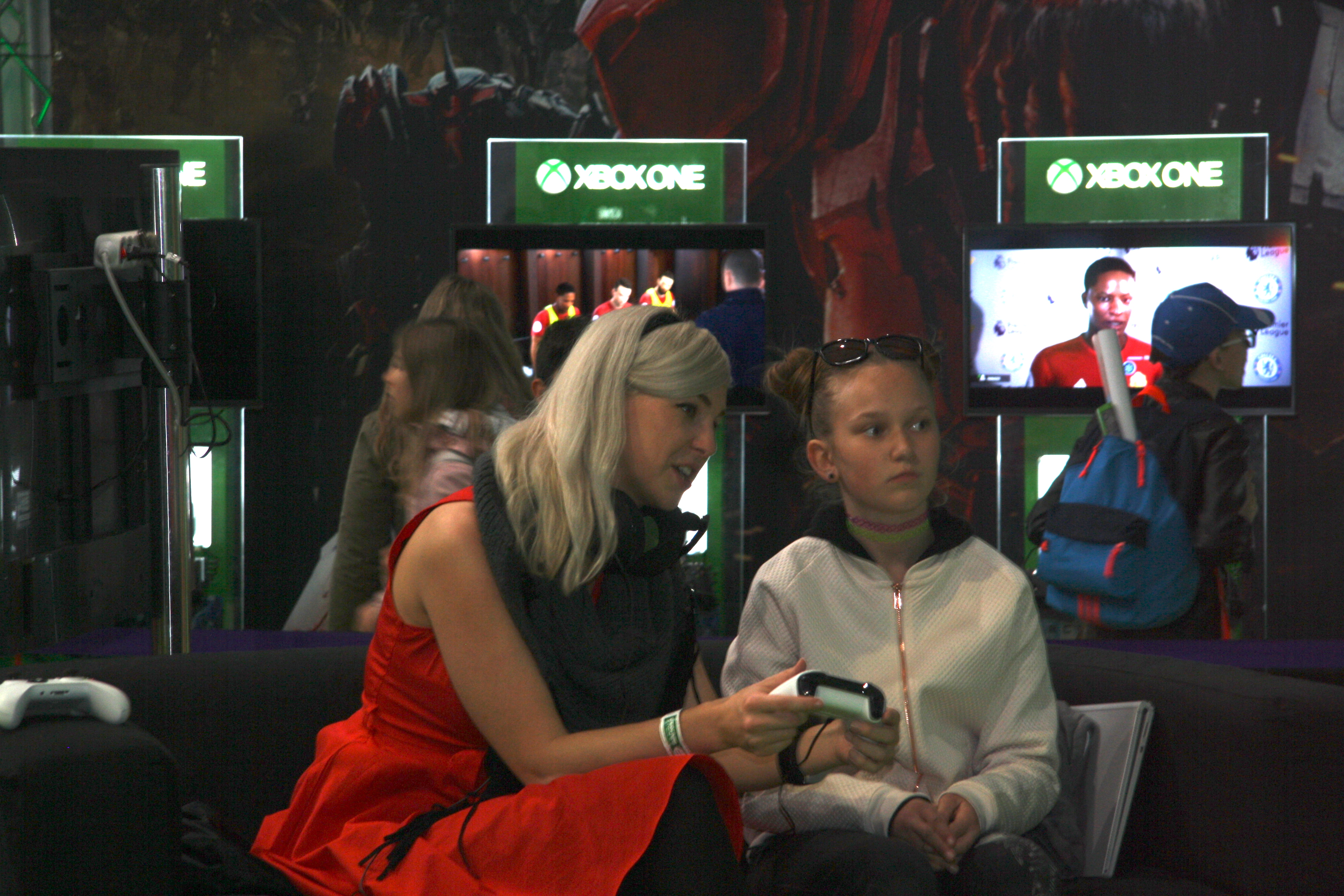
Trojanová at the Utubering festival in Prague, 2017

A job working in internet marketing at the publishing house Ringier led Trojanová to start writing about games for ABC, a youth-oriented science and technology magazine owned by Ringier, and then Score game magazine. Trojanová and Mikoláš Tuček became well known for cohosting the video game television program Re-play, on Prima Cool, from 2011 to 2019. In 2015, internet media company Tiscali Media launched entertainment website Booom.cz, that would be managed by Trojanová in collaboration with YouTubers such as Jiří Král.

Trojanová and Tuček next cohosted the Televize Seznam video game shows New Game+ in 2019 and then New+ from November 2019 to January 2020, however both were cancelled after cycling through several formats. After the pair's contract with Televize Seznam was terminated later that year, Trojanová moved to Tiscali Media, joining the editorial board and managing video content of its website Games.cz. That year she also began hosting Geek News, a technology and software news show, for online electronics retailer CZC.cz.

Trojanová has spoken on topics such as sexism and gender representation in video games.

== Personal life ==
In 2022, Trojanová disclosed on social media that she had been in treatment for breast cancer for several months.
