= Change My Mind =

Change My Mind may refer to:

== Music ==
- Change My Mind (album), a 2012 album by Billy Ray Cyrus, or the title song
- "Change My Mind" (The Oak Ridge Boys song), originally recorded by The Oak Ridge Boys in 1991 and by John Berry in 1996
- "Change My Mind" (Riley Green song), 2024
- "Change My Mind", a song by NewDad from the album Madra
- "Change My Mind", a song by One Direction from the album Take Me Home
- "Change My Mind", a song by Puddle of Mudd from the album Life on Display
- "Changed My Mind", a song by Tove Styrke
- "Changed My Mind", a song by Todrick Hall from Forbidden

== Film and television ==
- Change My Mind, a segment of Louder with Crowder
- Velký vlastenecký výlet, a 2025 Czech documentary, whose title is sometimes given in English as Change My Mind

== Other ==
- Change My Mind (meme), an internet meme introduced in 2018
