= Lajna =

- Starring: Jiří Langmajer; Hana Vagnerová; Zdeněk Piškula
- Country of origin: Czech Republic
- Original language: Czech
- No. of seasons: 3
- No. of episodes: 24

Production
- Running time: 21–25 minutes

Original release
- Network: Obbod TV (season 1); Televize Seznam
- Release: 2017 – 2021

Lajna is a Czech web series written by Petr Kolečko and directed by Vladimír Skórka. The first season was produced by Obbod TV. The second season was produced by TV Seznam. The third season was produced by TV Seznam and TV JOJ. The first season of the series has won the Best Online Series award at the Serial Killer festival. The series was renewed for fourth season produced by TV Seznam in 2023. Season 4 was eventually cancelled when Skórka decided to stop preparations as he felt exhausted. A film continuation was announced in 2026.

The main character is an ice hockey coach Luboš Hrouzek, a member of the winning team from Nagano with NHL playing experience, who is currently divorcing his wife and leaving to Havířov with his son Patrik, a talented ice hockey player, where he should train a local club.

A spin-off Luptákův vlogísek (Lupták's vlog) was filmed. It focuses on Igor Lupták. The series had 12 episodes. The script was written by Štěpán Kozub and Albert Čuba, the latter of which also directed the series.

== Cast ==
- Jiří Langmajer as Luboš Hrouzek
- Hana Vagnerová as Denisa
- Zdeněk Piškula as Patrik Hrouzek
- Norbert Lichý as snow groomer operator Zbyňa
