= Czech Technical University in Prague =

University in Czechia

- České vysoké učení technické v Praze
- Motto: Scientia est potentia (Latin)
- Motto in English: Knowledge is power
- Type: Public
- Established: 1707; 319 years ago 1806; 220 years ago
- Affiliations: PEGASUS
- Rector: Michal Pěchouček
- Administrative staff: 1,786 (2019)
- Students: 17,229 (2019)
- Location: Prague, Czech Republic; 50°6′7.8″N 14°23′18.5″E
- Website: www.cvut.cz/en

Location: Prague, Czech Republic

University rankings

Global – Overall
- QS World: =416 (2026)

Regional – Overall
- QS Emerging Europe and Central Asia: 12 (2022)

Czech Technical University in Prague (CTU) (Czech: České vysoké učení technické v Praze, ČVUT) is one of the largest universities in the Czech Republic with 8 faculties, and is one of the oldest institutes of technology in Central Europe. It is also the oldest non-military technical university in Europe.

In the academic year 2020/21, Czech Technical University offered 130 degree programs in Czech and 84 in English. It was considered one of the top 10 universities in emerging Europe and Central Asia in the same year.

== History ==
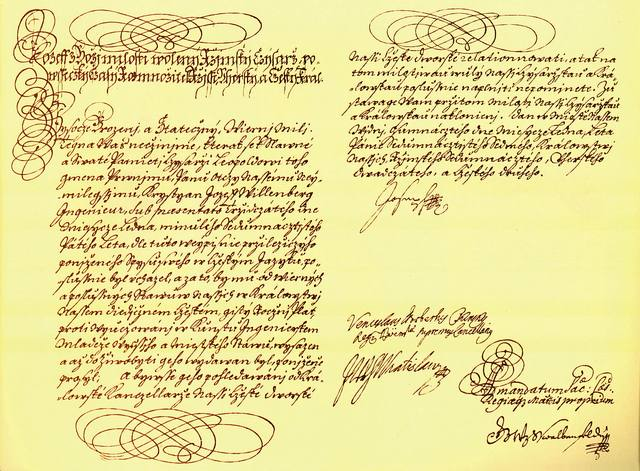
The founding decree of the Institute of Engineering (predecessor of the Czech Technical University) ratified by Joseph I, Holy Roman Emperor; January 18, 1707

It was established as the Institute of Engineering Education in 1707, but as a secondary education (high school) instead of a tertiary university, by Emperor Joseph Ias a response to Christian Josef Willenberg's petition addressed to preceding emperor Leopold I. In 1806, the institute of Engineering Education was transformed into Prague Polytechnical Institute (or Prague Polytechnic), i.e. a school independent of the University of Prague. This was a Europe-wide trend in the early 19th century, as polytechnical universities were established following the model of the French École Polytechnique. After the disintegration of the Austro-Hungarian Empire, the name of the school was changed in 1920 to the Czech Technical University in Prague.

=== Origins (18th century) ===
In 1705, Christian Josef Willenberg asked Emperor Leopold I for permission to teach "the art of engineering". Later, the emperor's only son, who succeeded him on the throne in 1707 as Joseph I, ordered the Czech state of Prague to provide engineering education. For various reasons, the request was not implemented for some time. However, in October 1716, Willenberg repeated the request. Finally, on 9 November 1717, a decree by the Czech state granted Willenberg the first engineering professorship in Central Europe (formally as part of University of Prague). On 7 January 1718, he began teaching.

Initially, Willenberg started teaching only 12 students in his own apartment (six barons, four knights, and two burghers), but gradually students proliferated (in 1779, there were around 200) and they started studying in more suitable premises. Initially, the training focused mainly on the military. Teaching in the first year lasted one hour per day; in the second year, almost two.

The successor of Willenberg was Johann Ferdinand Schor, builder of hydraulic structures in the basin of the Vltava and author of textbooks used at the school of mathematics. He began under Willenberg's leadership by teaching optics, perspectivity, technical drawing and geography. The third was professor František Antonín Herget, who mainly focused on civil engineering, particularly construction.

In September 1776, Maria Theresa allowed Herget to use the Clementinum building; in 1786, the school moved to the new and better building. In 1787, the School of Engineering was established at the decree of Emperor Joseph II and merged with the University of Prague.

=== Growth and ethnic split (19th century) ===
In 1815, the institution became independent again as the Royal Bohemian Estate Technical Institute in Prague (CS: Královské české stavovské technické učiliště v Praze, DE: Königliche böhmische ständische technische Lehranstalt zu Prag). The institute grew and changed its name several times during the 19th century. The biggest change was the split into Czech (Český polytechnický ústav království Českého) and German-speaking (Deutsches polytechnisches Institut) universities in 1869, caused by the rising ethnic tensions during the Czech National Revival.

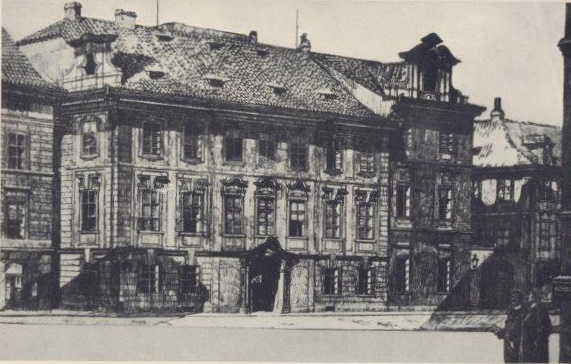
Technical University Prague before 1869

=== Closures and renewal (20th century) ===
During the Nazi occupation of Czechoslovakia, CTU was closed, along with all other Czech universities, on 17 November 1939 due to protests by Czech students. The German Technical University was not closed as it was managed directly by the Third Reich. The German University was closed by Czechoslovak President Beneš's decree in 1945 in the context of the expulsion of German speakers from Czechoslovakia. The Czech Technical University was reopened and is currently the sole successor of the institution's long and turbulent history.

== Academic profile ==
=== Rankings ===
The CTU is the best technical university in the Czech Republic. In 2010, in the world rating of THES-QS universities in the category of technical sciences, the CTU took the 121st place, in the category of natural sciences – 246th place. In 2018, Czech Technical University was ranked as 220th in Engineering and Technology in the QS World University Rankings.

=== Admissions ===
Students apply to faculty. Each faculty has different admissions requirements. Acceptance rate ranges from 52.32% (Faculty of Information Technology) to 81.51% (Faculty of Transportation Sciences). The percentage of international students grew from 2.5% in 2000 to 16.4% in 2017.

=== Graduation rate ===
Due to the pace and difficulty of CTU coursework, high percentage of students fail to complete first year of their studies. First year failure rates range from 23% (Faculty of Civil Engineering) to 47% (Faculty of Information Technology). Overall, only 48% of enrolled undergraduate students end up graduating.

== University student teams ==
During their studies, students are encouraged to join one of many student teams within the university to gain real-life experience and work in teams on projects.

=== eForce Formula ===
Team based at Faculty of Electrical Engineering building a fully electric formula racing car to compete at international competitions.

=== CTU Robotics ===
CTU Robotics is a robotics team established by students of mechanical engineering designing, with the task being building a fully autonomous space rover vehicle and drones. The students are aiming to the prestigious international competition European Rover Challenge which annually takes place in Poland.

=== CTU Space Research ===
CTU Space Research is a student team. Their goal is to design and launch space rockets and stratospheric balloons. They compete in the European Rocketry Challenge (EuRoC) in Portugal.

== International cooperation ==
=== Study and work abroad ===
CTU has international agreements with 484 foreign universities. Many of them are ranked in the first hundred in QS World University Rankings such as National University of Singapore, Nanyang Technological University, Purdue University, Korea Institute of Science and Technology (KAIST), Hong Kong University of Science and Technology, Technical University of Munich, Delft University of Technology, KU Leuven or Pontificia Universidad Catolica de Chile.

CTU has many bilateral agreements with universities outside of Europe. The most sought after universities are from Canada, Australia, Singapore, United States and Japan. That said, every year many students choose to study in attractive destinations such as Argentina, Brazil, Chile, China, Hong Kong, India, Indonesia, South Africa, South Korea, Costa Rica, Mexico, New Zealand, Peru, Russia or Taiwan.

CTU also participates in the European programmes Erasmus and Leonardo.

=== International students ===
CTU has currently over 3500 international students from 117 countries. About 750 of them are an exchange students. One of the organizations that takes care of international students is Erasmus Student Network (ESN), which organizes Buddy Programme and extra-curricular activities.

=== Dual diploma ===
CTU has currently 21 agreements with universities such as Technical University of Munich, RWTH Aachen or Trinity College Dublin.

== Constituent parts ==
Faculty/school	Year founded
Civil Engineering	1707
Mechanical Engineering	1864
Electrical Engineering	1950
Nuclear Sciences and Physical Engineering	1955
Architecture	1976
MIAS School of Business	1992
Transportation Sciences	1993
Biomedical Engineering	2005
Information Technology	2009

CTU has 8 faculties. The oldest one (Faculty of Civil Engineering) was founded in 1707, while the youngest and most selective faculty (Faculty of Information Technology) was founded in 2009.

The university also has 5 university institutes, such as Czech Institute of Informatics, Robotics and Cybernetics, Klokner Institute, Institute of Physical Education and Sport, University Centre for Energy Efficient Buildings and Institute of Experimental and Applied Physics.

Other constituent parts include Computing and Information Centre, Technology and Innovation Centre, The Research Centre for Industrial Heritage, Centre for Radiochemistry and Radiation Chemistry, Division of Construction and Investment and Central Library.

The university also has a Publishing House and service facilities.

Student clubs within the CTU are integrated in the Student Union. It has 27 members and covers a wide range of free time activities, with the biggest club being Silicon Hill. The Student Union also organizes social events for students throughout the year.

== Notable alumni ==
- Gaston Banda-Bafiot, Central African engineer, diplomat, and politician
- František Běhounek, radiologist
- Christian Doppler, mathematician and physicist
- Ivan Puluj, physicist and one of the founders of medical radiology
- Antonín Engel, architect
- Vladimír Fischer, architect
- Zbyněk Frolík, entrepreneur and founder of LINET
- Josef Gerstner, physicist and engineer
- Václav Havel, statesman, writer and former dissident, who served as the last President of Czechoslovakia
- Josef Hlávka, architect, main founder of Academy of Science, patron
- Otakar Husák, CTU graduate, chemist, General, Czechoslovak Legionnaire in Russia and France, fighter from Zborov and Terron, Chairman of President Masaryk's Military Office, Minister of Defence, First Director of the Explosia Semtín factory, prisoner of concentration camps Dachau and Buchenwald, Director of the Synthesia Semtín (1945–1948), political prisoner (Prague Nusle-Pankrác, Mírov 1950–1956)
- Eva Jiřičná, architect
- Karel Jonáš, who became Charles Jonas (Wisconsin politician), Czech-American publisher, legislator and Lieutenant Governor of Wisconsin
- George Klir, computer and systems scientist
- Karl Kořistka, geographer and technologist
- František Křižík, inventor, electrical engineer and entrepreneur
- Ivo Lukačovič, entrepreneur, founder and chairman of Seznam.cz
- Jan Hird Pokorný, architect
- Vladimir Prelog, chemist and Nobel Prize winner
- Richard Rychtarik, set designer
- Marie Schneiderová-Zubaníková, first female Czech civil engineering graduate (in 1923)
- Alena Šolcová, mathematician, historian
- Vladimír Teyssler, engineer and author
- Emil Votoček, chemist
- Emil Weyr, mathematician
- Zdeněk Ziegler, artist
- Josef Zítek, architect and engineer

== Gallery ==
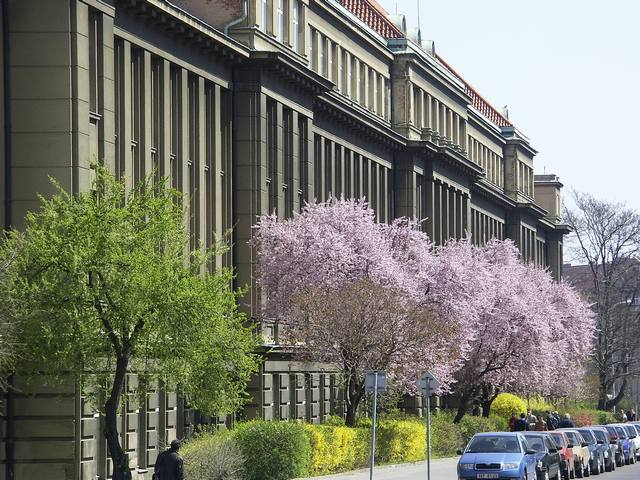
The CTU Rectorate

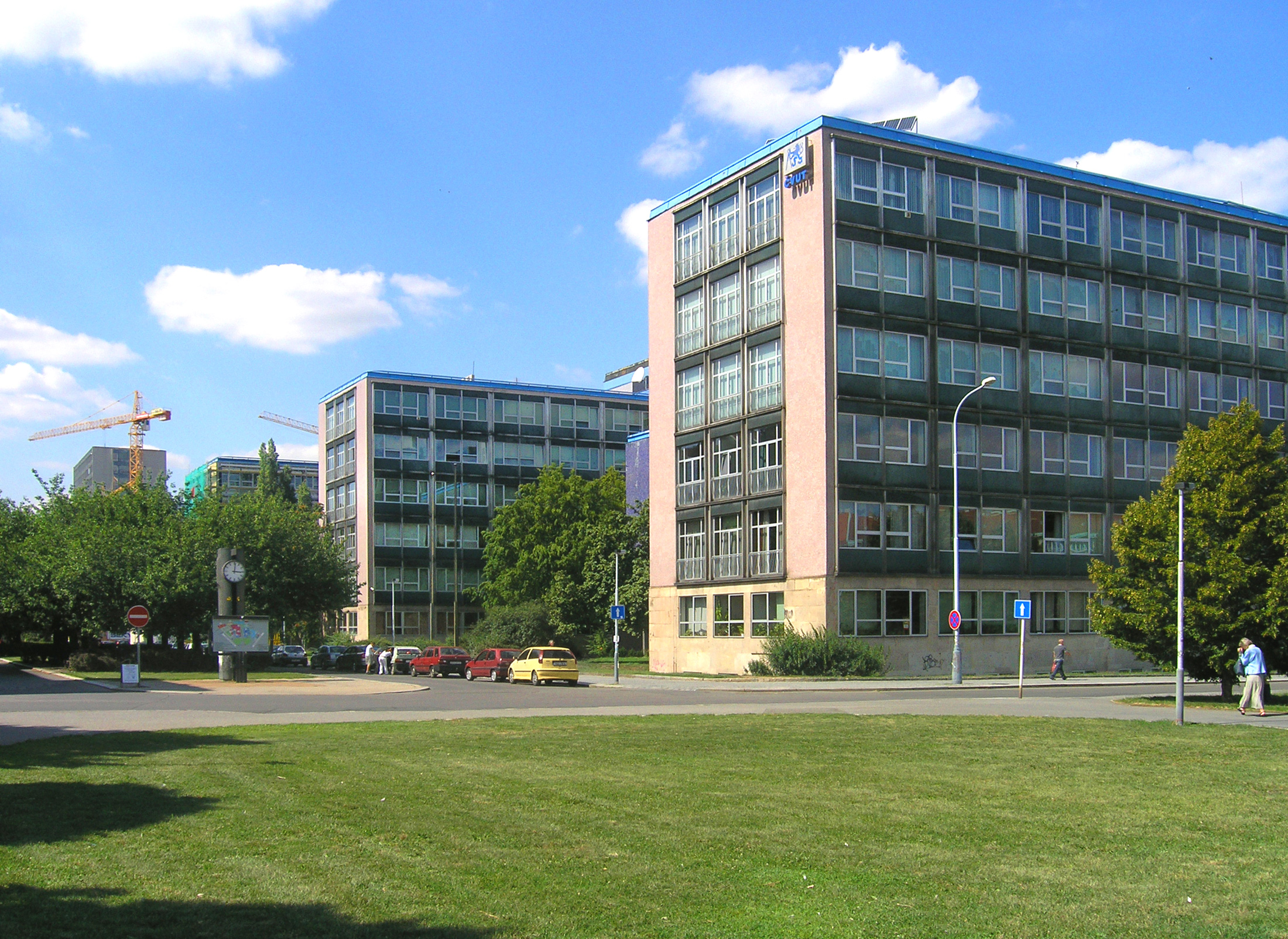
Dejvice campus

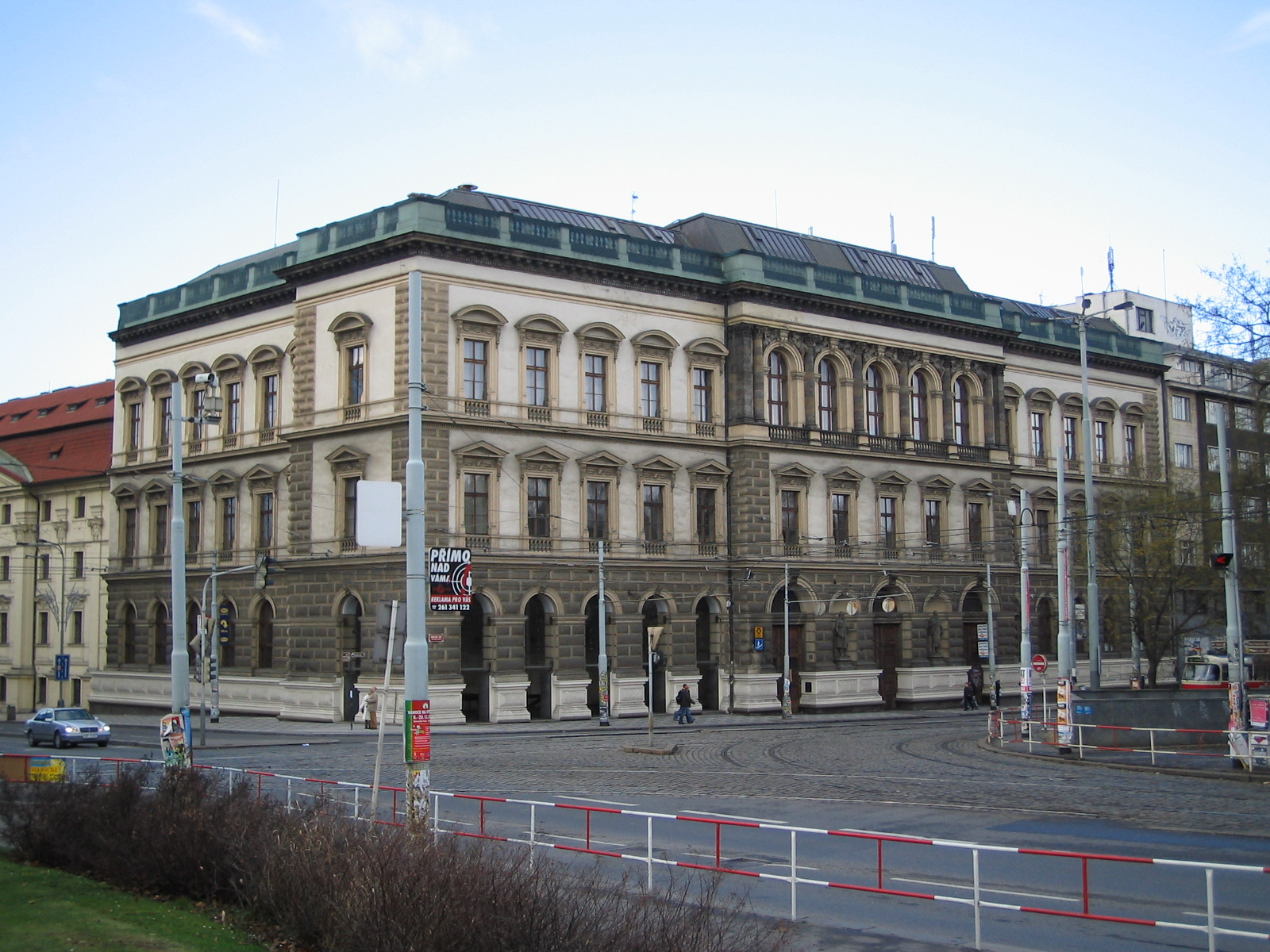
Karlovo Náměstí campus

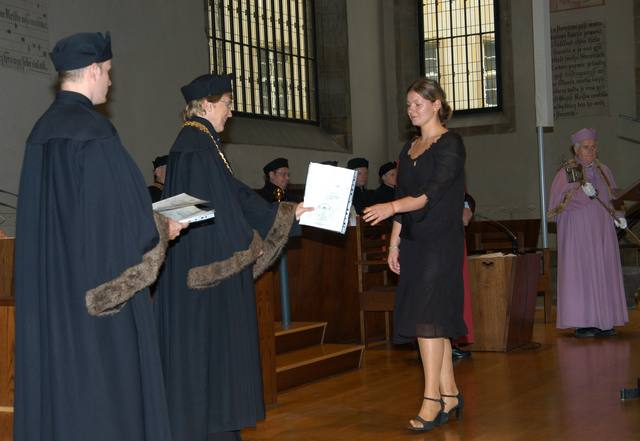
Bethlehem Chapel – The CTU's ceremonial hall

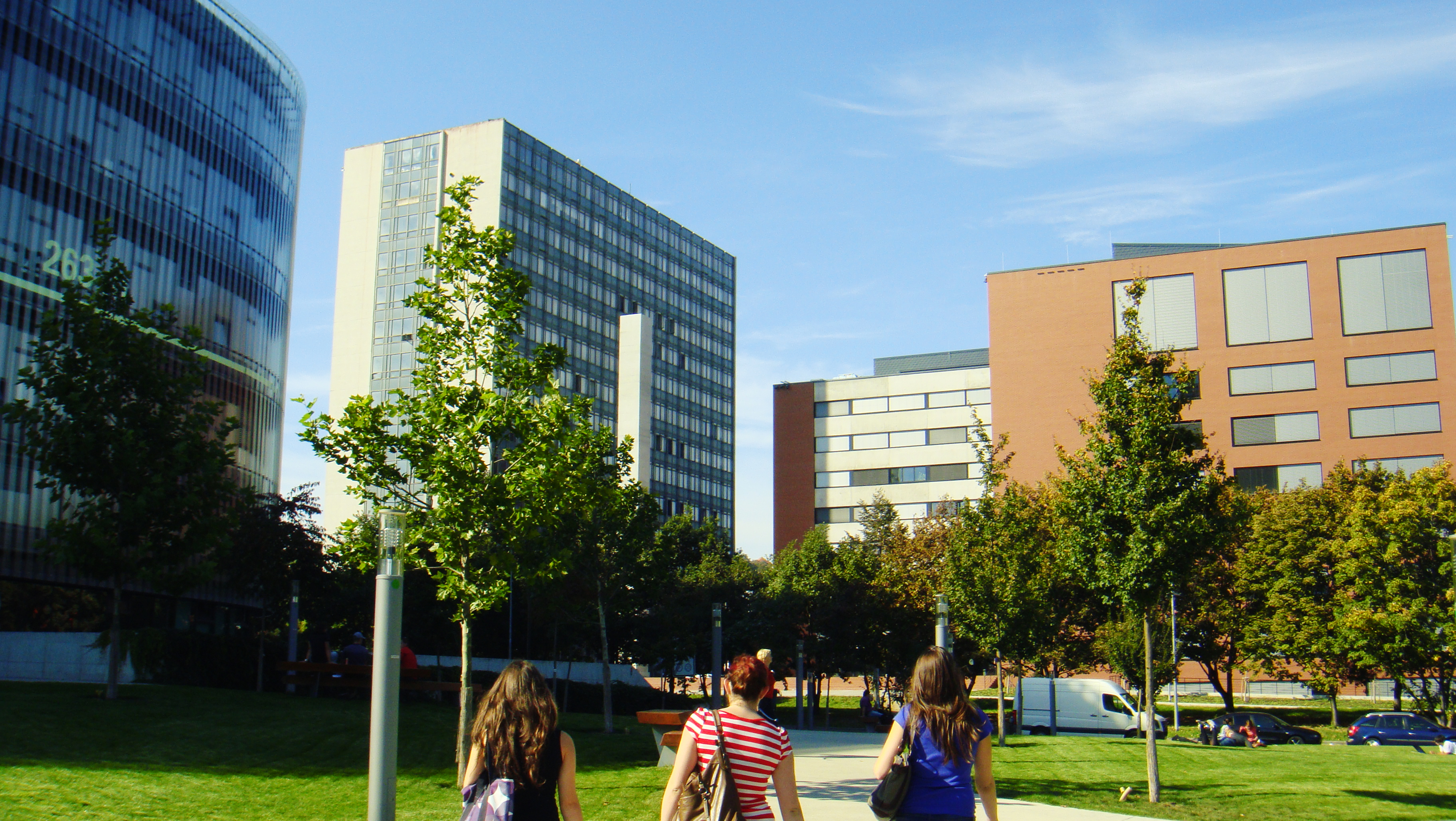
Dejvice campus - Library, FA, FIT

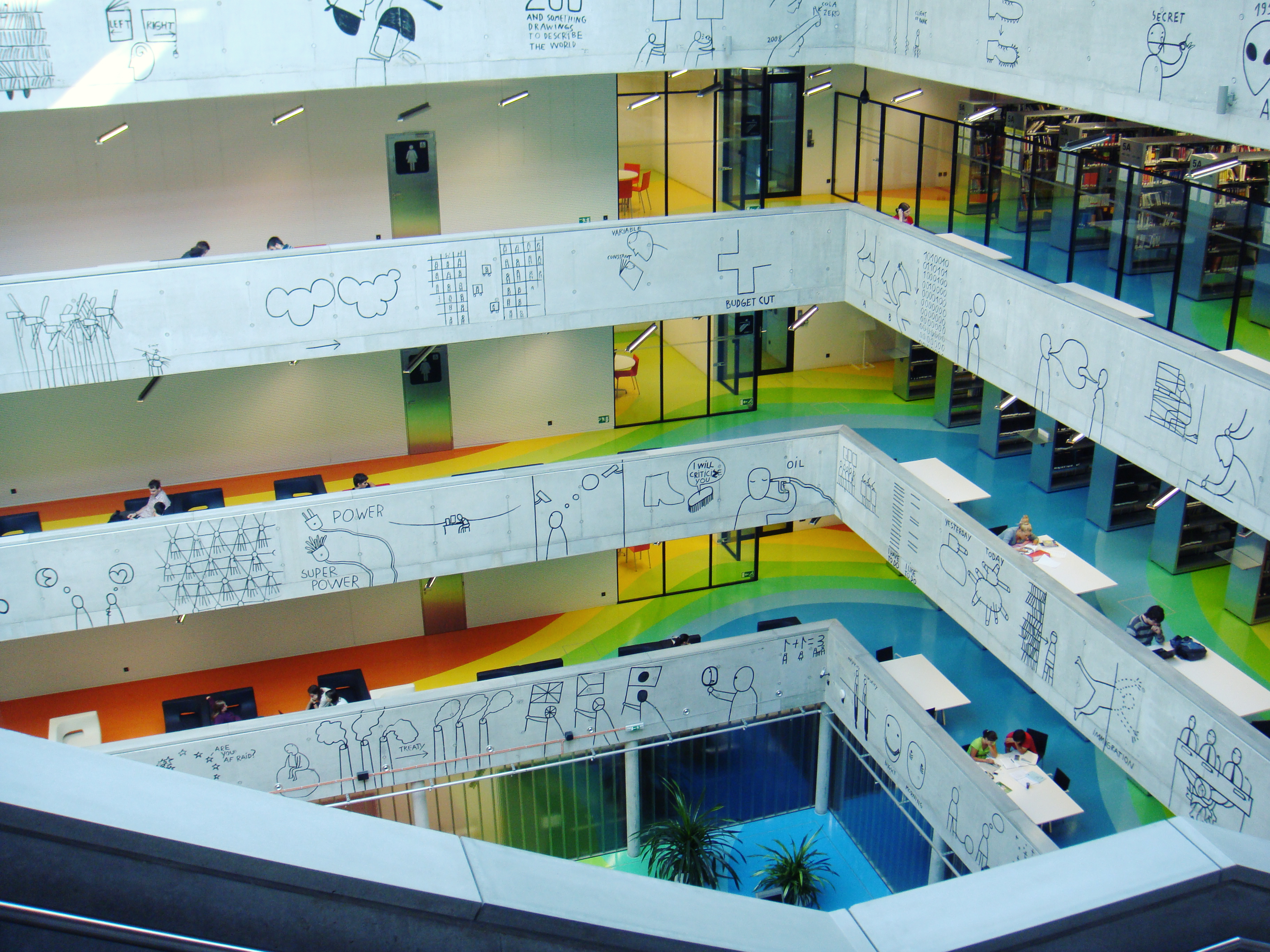
Interior of the National Library of Technology
