= Windy (weather service) =

Czech weather forecasting service

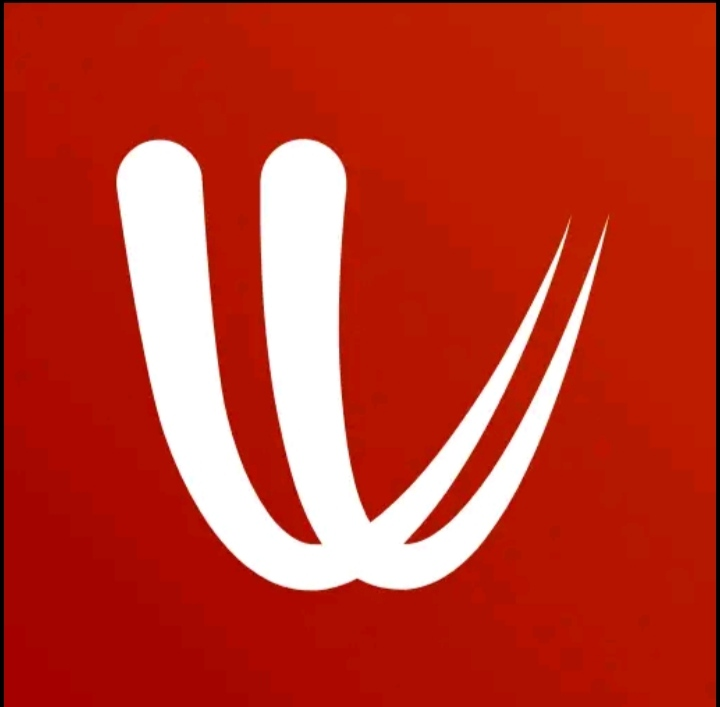
- Formerly: Windyty; Windytv
- Type: Private
- Genre: Weather forecasting
- Founded: 10 November 2014 (11 years ago)
- Founder: Ivo Lukačovič
- Headquarters: Prague, Czech Republic
- Services: Mobile applications; online forecasts
- Website: windy.com

Windy.com is a weather visualization platform that provides interactive global weather maps and forecasting tools. Founded in November 2014 by Ivo Lukačovič, the service is headquartered in the Czech Republic. Originally created as a wind visualization project, Windy has expanded into a comprehensive weather platform displaying forecasts, radar and satellite imagery, and meteorological data such as wind, temperature, precipitation and pressure.

The service uses data from multiple numerical weather prediction models, including ECMWF, GFS and ICON. It is used worldwide by weather enthusiasts and users in weather-dependent fields such as aviation and sailing.

== Weather models and data sources ==
Windy displays forecasts generated by multiple numerical weather prediction models operated by meteorological organizations and private providers. The platform allows users to compare forecasts from different models, which can vary in resolution, coverage and methodology.

=== Global models ===
The global models available include:

- Global Forecast System (GFS), operated by the National Centers for Environmental Prediction of the United States
- ECMWF model, developed by the European Centre for Medium-Range Weather Forecasts
- ICON model, developed by the Deutscher Wetterdienst (DWD) and partners
- Meteoblue AI Global Model, developed by the Swiss weather company Meteoblue

=== Regional models ===
Windy also provides regional high-resolution models for selected areas, including:

- NEMS, developed by Meteoblue
- NAM, operated by the National Oceanic and Atmospheric Administration (NOAA)
- HRDPS, operated by Environment and Climate Change Canada
- AROME, developed by Météo-France, covering France, Germany and the Alps

== History ==
Windy was founded in November 2014 by Ivo Lukačovič, the founder of Seznam.cz, as Windyty. It has initially focused on visualizing global wind patterns. The service later expanded beyond wind animation into a broader weather visualization platform and was renamed Windy.com.

During the 2020s, Windy significantly expanded its capabilities by adding new meteorological data sources, forecast models, radar and satellite products, and additional weather layers. The platform developed into a global service that allows users to compare forecasts from multiple numerical weather prediction models. The service also expanded its user base and mobile presence.

In 2024, Windy acquired a majority stake in Meteoblue.

In 2025, its mobile application surpassed 50 million downloads on Google Play.
