= Meteoblue =

Meteorological service

- Established: September 26, 2006 (20 years ago)
- Legal status: Aktiengesellschaft
- Owners: Windyty, University of Basel

Meteoblue AG (stylized as meteoblue) is a Swiss weather forecasting company. It provides weather and climate services to consumers and to businesses in sectors including agriculture and renewable energy. The service originated at the University of Basel, and the company was established as a university spin-off in 2006. Meteoblue uses artificial intelligence to combine forecasts from multiple weather models.

In 2024, the weather service Windy acquired a majority stake in Meteoblue.

== History ==
In 1986, the Sandoz chemical disaster near Basel exposed gaps in cross-border meteorological analysis when Swiss, French and German meteorological services produced conflicting assessments of the direction in which potentially toxic smoke was moving. The disaster gave new impetus to regional climate research, and the University of Basel subsequently established the Institute for Meteorology, Climatology and Remote Sensing to improve local weather modelling.

The forecasting work that became Meteoblue was developed at the institute. By 2005, meteoblue.ch was providing publicly accessible, high-resolution forecasts for Europe and had received the SWITCH Innovation Award. Meteoblue AG was established as an independent university spin-off in 2006. For the 2020 release of Microsoft Flight Simulator, developed by Asobo Studio, Meteoblue supplied global weather data used to simulate weather conditions in the game.

== Services and technology ==
Meteoblue produces weather forecasts using its own global and regional numerical weather prediction models together with forecast data from external providers. Its model families include NMM and NEMS. The company's Meteoblue Learning MultiModel (mLM) system combines output from multiple models with weather observations, radar and satellite data, using machine learning to produce location-specific forecasts.

Forecasts are made available through Meteoblue's website and mobile applications. The company also supplies forecast and historical weather data through API and provides climate datasets.
