= Velký vlastenecký výlet =

- Directed by: Robin Kvapil
- Written by: Robin Kvapil
- Produced by: Jakub Drocar, Jakub Pinkava
- Starring: Nikola, Ivo, Petra
- Cinematography: Prokop Souček, Stanislav Adam
- Edited by: Libor Alexa
- Music by: Martin Tauber
- Production company: Punk Film
- Distributed by: Bontonfilm
- Release date: 21 August 2025
- Running time: 100 minutes
- Country: Czech Republic
- Language: Czech

Velký vlastenecký výlet (lit. 'The Great Patriotic Trip'; English: Change My Mind) is a 2025 Czech documentary road movie written and directed by Robin Kvapil. It follows three Czech citizens, sympathetic to Russia and Vladimir Putin, who espouse pro-Russian narratives about the Russo-Ukrainian War and whom the director took to Ukraine to confront their views with the situation there.

== Synopsis ==
The project began with an open call aimed at people skeptical of mainstream media coverage of the war. From around sixty applicants, three participants were selected: Ivo, Nikola, and Petra—who described themselves as "dezoláti" (a Czech pejorative for naïve conspiracy believers; loosely translatable as loony). In October 2024 they traveled by minibus from Prague to the Donbas, visiting cities such as Kharkiv and the area around Izium.

The protagonists visit Kyiv and Kharkiv, where children study in metro shelters, and the forest near Izium where mass graves of Russian war crimes were discovered. Petra remarks in the film that this is "perfect material for Ukrainian propaganda". They also film destroyed neighborhoods of Kharkiv, including Saltivka, talk with residents, and visit bomb sites and hospitals.

Their reactions—ranging from trivializing tragedy to moments of emotion—are juxtaposed with the direct reality of war. They often repeat stereotypical claims, such as that Russia "had no other choice" or that it "does not bomb hospitals to kill the sick". At other times, they show respect and gratitude to Ukrainians—hugging them, praising children's education, and expressing admiration for their resilience.

== Cast and crew ==
- Robin Kvapil (director and writer)
- Petr Pojman (security analyst)
- Stanislav Adam (cinematography)
- Prokop Souček (cinematography)
- Jakub Drocar, Jakub Pinkava (producers)
- Libor Alexa (editing)
- Martin Tauber (sound)
- Peter Pöthe (psychiatrist)
- Lucija Rzegoszyková (translator)
- Nikola – cattle farmer, who justifies the Russian invasion and sexual violence by soldiers, claiming Russians "had no choice", and notes that he met many Russians who "never deceived him".
- Ivo – gardener, who relativizes Russian war crimes, including justifying child rape as a "crisis situation" for soldiers; also speaks of his own personal hardships and loneliness, and adopts the self-designation "dezolát".
- Petra – theology graduate, who fears "green liberal ideologies", criticizes Volodymyr Zelenskyy as "begging for money for a lost war". In Izium she questions the authenticity of mass graves, calling them "fake" and "propaganda material". Later in the film she begins to ask questions about the purpose of Russian actions and the fate of civilians in occupied territories.

== Production and release ==
Kvapil conceived the film in response to growing Czech Russophilia and skepticism toward supporting Ukraine. The project was carried out with the news portal Novinky.cz, which acted as a media partner. A casting call was announced in September 2024 targeting people with "anti-system attitudes", skeptical of Western support for Ukraine or openly sympathetic to Kremlin policies. Around sixty people applied, and three were chosen.

The journey was coordinated with the Czech Ministry of the Interior and the Security Service of Ukraine. Filming took place in autumn 2024 in Kharkiv, Kyiv, and the Donbas. The documentary was produced by Punk Film.

The official premiere took place on 21 August 2025, coinciding with the anniversary of the Warsaw Pact invasion of Czechoslovakia in 1968. Fragments were earlier released on social media. The distributor is Bontonfilm. One of the first screenings was accompanied by a public debate.

== Reception ==
Before its release, the film generated wide public debate in the Czech Republic, with critics emphasizing the "stunning" contrast between the protagonists' attitudes and the wartime reality. Jan Škoda in ČT24 called it a road movie and noted that participants, despite personal courage, often repeated narratives aligned with Russian propaganda. Lenka Hloušková in Novinky.cz described scenes in which participants rejected evidence of atrocities, including Petra doubting the authenticity of mass graves in Izium.

Marek Čech's review in Novinky.cz argued the film offers a "probe into the mind of a dezolát", highlighting disturbing moments such as Ivo excusing rape or Petra rummaging through ruined homes and collecting "souvenirs". Kvapil remains restrained for most of the film, confronting participants only at the end. The review concluded that the film functions as a social experiment and raises questions about manipulation, empathy deficits, and the rigidity of beliefs. Čech rated the film 80%.

MovieZone praised the engaging form and dynamic editing but noted the limitations of the method, with much footage adding little new insight. Jason Pirodsky in The Prague Reporter called it an "existentially exhausting documentary" that works more as a testimony of contemporary times than as art. He highlighted disturbing scenes, including Ivo justifying rape, which caused a crew member to leave the set, and Petra dismissing a mass grave as fake.

Balkan Insight described the film as "bold and controversial", noting both praise for its importance and criticism for potentially patronizing participants. Deutsche Welle noted that the film shocked Czech society and sparked debate on pro-Russian sentiment. It was also covered in Polish media (including Polskie Radio and TVP Info), where it was highlighted as an example of a documentary showing the impact of pro-Russian disinformation.
