= Vraždy v kruhu =

- Genre: Crime drama
- Written by: Iva Procházková
- Directed by: Ivan Pokorný
- Starring: Ivan Trojan, Richard Krajčo, Hana Vagnerová, Marek Němec
- Country of origin: Czech Republic
- Original language: Czech
- No. of seasons: 1
- No. of episodes: 12

Production
- Running time: 74 minutes

Original release
- Network: ČT1
- Release: January 5 – March 23, 2015

Vraždy v kruhu (English: The Zodiac Murders) is a Czech crime television series directed by Ivan Pokorný and starring Ivan Trojan, Richard Krajčo and Hana Vagnerová. It is based on the script by Ivy Procházková. . The specifics of the series is the connection of criminal stories with astrology. It consists of 12 episodes which form the skeleton of 12 different crimes committed from motives that are attributed to the 12 signs of the zodiac. Czech Television prepared it for its premiere broadcast on 5 January 2015, in the main Monday evening slot which is established for detective stories. The last episode aired on 23 March 2015.

The series was nominated for the Czech Lion in the category Best TV Series but didn't win.

== Cast ==
=== Main ===
- Ivan Trojan as major Marián Holina
- Marek Němec as poručík Diviš Mrštík
- Richard Krajčo as kapitán Rosťa Bor
- Hana Vagnerová as Sábina Borová
- Simona Stašová as majorka Lída Šotolová
- Jiří Štrébl as podplukovník Zdeněk Karoch
- Adéla Petřeková as poručice Pavlína Fibichová
- Pavel Oubram as podporučík Jarda Svoboda
- Adéla Gondíková as Crazy reporter
- Martina Eliášová as MUDr. Hana Léblová
- Petr Panzenberger as Medical examiner assistant
- Petra Bučková as Mudr. Jitka Uhlířová
- Zdena Hadrbolcová as neighbor Štajfová

== Production ==
Czech Television announced the filming of the series in the summer of 2013, specifically from June. It confirmed its planned inclusion in the program in March 2014, along with other series and programs. It should have been classified as a detective story of a classic socio-psychological nature, modeled after Scandinavian detective stories, and based mainly on the strong personality of the main character.
