= Borders of Love =

- Czech poster
- Directed by: Tomasz Wiński
- Written by: Kasha Jandáčková, Hana Vagnerová, Petra Hůlová, Tomasz Wiński
- Produced by: Jiří Konečný, Tomasz Wiński, Tereza Nejedlá
- Starring: Hana Vagnerová, Matyáš Řezníček
- Cinematography: Kryštof Melka
- Distributed by: Aerofilms
- Release dates: 4 July 2022 (KVIFF); 3 November 2022 (Czech Republic)
- Running time: 95 minutes
- Countries: Czech Republic; Poland
- Language: Czech

Borders of Love (Czech: Hranice lásky) is a 2022 Czech-Polish erotic drama film directed by Tomasz Wiński. It premiered at Karlovy Vary International Film Festival on 4 July 2022. The film was announced as an erotic thriller about the boundaries of love and freedom. Hana Vagnerová and Matyáš Řezníček are cast in the main roles, Martin Hofmann and Eliška Křenková appear in supporting roles. The film entered theatres on 3 November 2022.

== Plot ==
Hana and Petr live a somewhat stereotypical life and their relationship lacks energy. Hana decides to share her sexual dreams and fantasies with Petr, but she soon moves from imagination to action. The search for limits of commitment and freedom in partner life begins to gain momentum after other men and women are drawn into erotic games.

== Cast ==
- Hana Vagnerová as Hana
- Matyáš Řezníček as Petr
- Eliška Křenková as Vanda
- Martin Hofmann
- Lenka Krobotová
- Hynek Čermák
- Antonie Formanová as Antonie
- Jiří Rendl

== Reception ==
In a July 2022 review for Film Verdict, Ben Nicholson called the film a "knotty and intimate examination of honesty within relationship dynamics." Nicholson continued, "With a narrative that feels like it could easily veer into all-out erotic melodrama, Borders of Love is impressively anchored by the performances of its two leads which don’t feel inauthentic for a single beat."
