= Vladimír Teyssler =

Czechoslovak Professor at the Czech Higher Technical School and engineer

Vladimír Teyssler (31 December 1891 in Prague – 15 February 1958 in Prague) was a Czechoslovak engineer and professor at the Czech Higher Technical School in Prague (later Czech Technical University). From 1927 to 1949 Teyssler, together with editor Václav Kotyška, published Technický slovník naučný (Technical Encyclopedia), a massive illustrated Czech-language encyclopedia covering technical topics.

After matura exams in 1909, Teyssler went to study mechanical engineering at the Czech Higher Technical School, which he finished in May 1914. During World War I he served in the Austro-Hungarian Army. In 1921 he started to work for his alma mater, in the newly established engineering laboratory (which he managed for over 30 years). Starting in 1933 Teyssler taught technical measurements; in 1938 he was appointed docent. When Czech universities were forcibly closed in 1940, Teyssler was named director of a certification engineering institute (ZÚS, until 1947). After 1945 he taught at the technical university again; in 1952 he was appointed professor and was active until his death in 1958.

== Technical author ==
Since 1921 Teyssler published numerous technical articles, engineering textbooks and proceedings. In 1925–1926 preparations for a technical encyclopedia started: the first volume was published in 1927, the last (15th) in 1939. Two addenda were printed, in 1941 and 1949. Over a thousand editors participated in the work.
