= Organised Crime Unit (TV series) =

- Genre: Action Crime drama
- Directed by: Petr Kotek
- Starring: Robert Jašków; Hana Vagnerová; Pavel Zedníček
- Country of origin: Czech Republic
- Original language: Czech
- No. of seasons: 2
- No. of episodes: 34

Production
- Running time: 75 minutes

Original release
- Network: TV Nova
- Release: 2011 – 2016

Organised Crime Unit (Czech: Expozitura) is a Czech action crime series which was aired on TV Nova. It was filmed in 2008, but premiered in September 2011. The series is based on the real case of Berdych's gang. It is the most expensive television series ever produced in the Czech Republic. Broadcasting rights were later sold to United States of America. Season 2 was broadcast in 2015-2016 under name Atentát (Assassination).

== Cast ==
Main cast of Organised Crime Unit:

- Robert Jašków - Dan Chládek - The main male protagonist. He is an experienced cop and a member of the Organised Crime Unit.
- Hana Vagnerová - Tereza Hodáčová - The female lead in the series - a young cop who is accepted into the Organised Crime Unit.
- Pavel Zedníček - Vladimír Orava -The oldest member of the Unit. He seems to be friendly, wise and humane. It turns out that he is corrupt and connected to organised crime. He is the main antagonist.
- Jan Dolanský - Ota Kofčín - Partner of Orava. He is also very corrupt
- Jan Kanyza - Viktor Skutek - The leader of the Unit. He is depressed, but remains a good cop.
- Jan Novotný - Jaroslav Brousil - The second in command of the Unit. He is very arrogant and tries to get publicity in media.
- Zuzana Bydžovská - Anna Hajnová - Analyst in the Unit. She is fixated on her dog but is very capable and a good person.
- Martin Sitta - Drobeček - A criminal connected to organised crime.

== List of episodes ==
- 1:Volavka (Undercover)
- 2:Hyena (Hyena)
- 3:Hadí střela (Snake's Shot)
- 4:Sedmý den (Seventh Day)
- 5:Tři králové (Three Kings)
- 6:Smrt policajta (Death of a Cop)
- 7:Únosy (Kidnappings)
- 8:Řezníci (The Butchers)
- 9:Král je mrtev (The King Is Dead)
- 10:Ruská spojka (The Russian Connection)
- 11:Osamělá mise (Solitary Mission)
- 12:Pašeráci (Smugglers)
- 13:Válka gangů (War of the Gangs)
- 14:Loupež století (The Robbery of the Century)
- 15:Korunní svědek (The Star Witness)
- 16:Vysoká hra (High Game)
