= A Murder Between Friends =

Comedy film starring Joan Collins

- Directed by: Trent Garrett; Jacob Young
- Written by: Mark Rozzano
- Produced by: Joan Collins; Percy Gibson; Trent Garrett; Jacob Young
- Starring: Joan Collins; Jacob Young; Toby-Alexander Smith; Nadia Bjorlin; Simon Cotton; India Thain; Hana Vagnerová
- Cinematography: Lukas Kalmar
- Music by: Daniel Davis; Trevor Barroero
- Production company: Northshire Entertainment Group
- Distributed by: Vision Films
- Release date: January 13, 2026
- Running time: 90 minutes
- Country: United States
- Language: English
- Budget: €700,000

A Murder Between Friends is a 2026 American mystery crime comedy film directed by Trent Garrett and Jacob Young and written by Mark Rozzano. The film stars Joan Collins as Francesca Carlyle, a true-crime television star and a European mansion owner. It also features supporting ensemble cast Jacob Young, Toby-Alexander Smith, Nadia Bjorlin, Simon Cotton, India Thain and Hana Vagnerová. It was shot on location at Úsobí Castle in the Czech Republic.

A Murder Between Friends was released in US on VOD and digital platforms on January 13, 2026 by Vision Films. It made its debut on UK digital platforms on June 15, 2026.

== Cast ==
- Joan Collins as Francesca Carlyle
- Jacob Young as Josh
- Toby-Alexander Smith as Sydney
- Nadia Bjorlin as Kat
- Simon Cotton as Devin
- India Thain as Sonia
- Hana Vagnerová as Louisa
- Trent Garrett as Alec
- Jim Borstelmann as Chauncey
- Espen Hatleskog as Andrej

== Reception ==
Film critic Leslie Felperin from The Guardian gave it 2 out of 5 stars, praising Collins' performance, but criticised the direction and other cast performances. Alan Ng from Film Threat gave it 6.5 out of 10 stars.
