= Ivo Lukačovič =

Czech IT entrepreneur

- Born: February 7, 1974 (age 52)
- Organization(s): Seznam.cz, Windy.com

Ivo Lukačovič (born 7 February 1974, in Prague) is a Czech Internet entrepreneur and founder and chairman of Seznam.cz, one of the Czech Republic's largest internet companies and a major Czech-language search engine. Founded in 1996, Seznam developed from an early web directory into a major provider of internet services, including search, email, news and maps.

Lukačovič also founded Windy.com, a global weather visualization platform providing interactive meteorological data. According to Forbes, he is one of the wealthiest people in the Czech Republic.

== Early life and Seznam.cz ==
Lukačovič was born in Prague and studied at the Czech Technical University in Prague, but discontinued his studies after seven years. During the early development of the World Wide Web in the Czech Republic, he created a Czech-language web directory written in Perl. The project developed into Seznam.cz, which was launched in 1996 and became one of the first major Czech internet services.

=== Seznam.cz ===
Originally created as a web directory, Seznam.cz expanded into a broader internet services company, including web search, email, news, maps and online advertising. The company became one of the largest Czech internet companies and maintained a significant position in the Czech market after the expansion of Google Search.

After selling a minority stake in Seznam.cz to foreign investors in 2007, Lukačovič later reacquired full ownership of the company in 2016.

== Technology projects ==
Lukačovič has also developed technology projects outside Seznam.cz. Citationtech, founded in 2011, focused on creating three-dimensional maps from aerial imagery and geospatial data.

The weather visualization platform Windy.com was launched in 2014. The service provides interactive visualizations of global meteorological data, including wind patterns, forecasts and satellite imagery.

== Aviation interests ==
Between 2010 and 2015, Lukačovič financed the restoration of a historic Lockheed Model 10 Electra aircraft previously owned by Jan Antonín Baťa. The aircraft was flown from Toronto to Točná Airport near Prague in 2015, where it became part of a private aviation collection.
