= A Studio Rubín =

Theatre in Prague, Czech Republic

A studio Rubín
- A studio Rubín

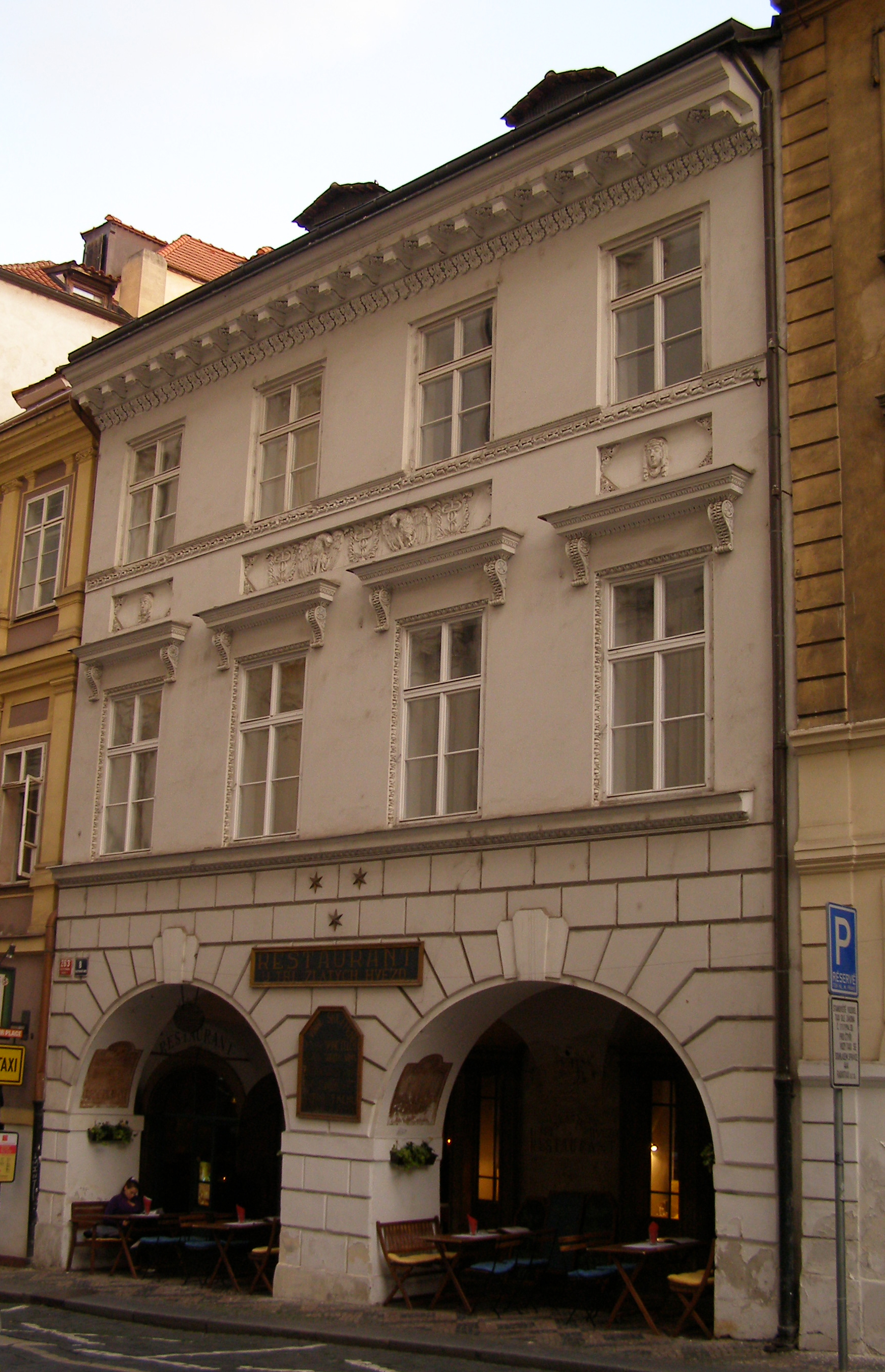
- An image of A Studio Rubín
- Interactive map of A studio Rubín
- Address: Malostranské náměstí 262/9; Prague 1 Czech Republic
- Coordinates: 50.088924°N 14.402475°E

Website
- Official website

A studio Rubín is a historic building and theatre located at Malostranske Namesti 262/9, 118 00 Praha Malá Strana in Prague in the Czech Republic. It is located in a late medieval building known as the "House of the Three Crowns", which was built around 1465 and since 1484 served as a hospital. It was later rebuilt in 1603 and from 1684 has served as a residential house. Today's appearance of the facade is from 1883.
