= Faculty of Information Technology, Czech Technical University in Prague =

Faculty of Information Technology
- Fakulta informačních technologií
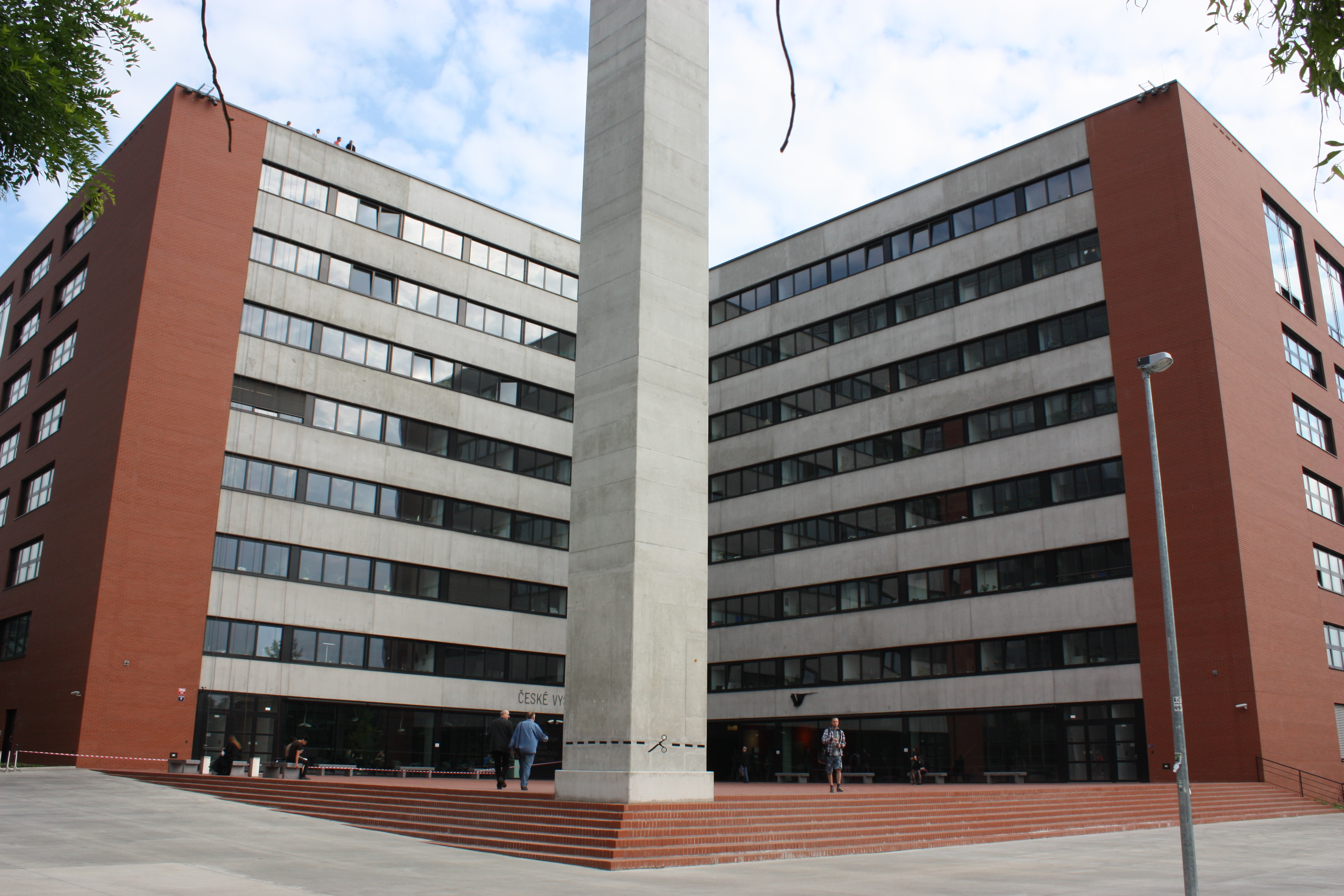
- One of FIT CTU buildings
- Type: Public
- Established: 2009
- Affiliations: Czech Technical University in Prague
- Dean: doc. Ing. Jan Janoušek, Ph.D.
- Students: ≈2250
- Location: Prague, Czech Republic; 50°6′18″N 14°23′23″E
- Campus: Urban
- Website: fit.cvut.cz

Location: Prague, Czech Republic

Faculty of Information Technology, Czech Technical University in Prague (FIT CTU) (Czech: Fakulta informačních technologií, České vysoké učení technické v Praze; FIT ČVUT) was established on 1 July 2009, as the eighth and the youngest faculty of Czech Technical University in Prague. The school offers undergraduate and graduate programmes including doctoral programme. FIT CTU is part of many alliances and associations such as Informatics Europe.

== History ==
FIT CTU was established on 1 July 2009 and its first academic year started on 21 September 2009. It was created by splitting of faculty of electrical engineering's computer department. About 500 student's were admitted to the first academic year of the institution. Of these 500 students, about 10% were women and about 20% were international students.

== Academic profile ==
Students in undergraduate and graduate study programme can choose from variety of specializations from Computer Science, Computer Engineering, Computer Security, Web and Software Engineering to Data Science. Specializations can be selected throughout the study programme, but it needs to be selected before choosing bachelor's/master's thesis topic.

People studying in Czech study at FIT CTU for free. On the other hand, the tuition fee for people studying in English is 64000 CZK (or 2475 EUR) per semester as of 2020.

Due to the pace and difficulty of FIT's coursework it has the highest first year failure rate out of all faculties at CTU. It has also the lowest acceptance rate (52.32%).

== Conferences and events ==
Every year, FIT CTU organizes many Czech and international events. One of them is international Linux conference LinuxDays. Another event for Linux operating system enthusiasts co-organized by FIT is InstallFest. Additionally, the biggest meeting of Python community PyCon CZ, law and IT conference LAW FIT or international stringology conference The Prague Stringology Conference takes place on FIT's premises.

== Photos ==
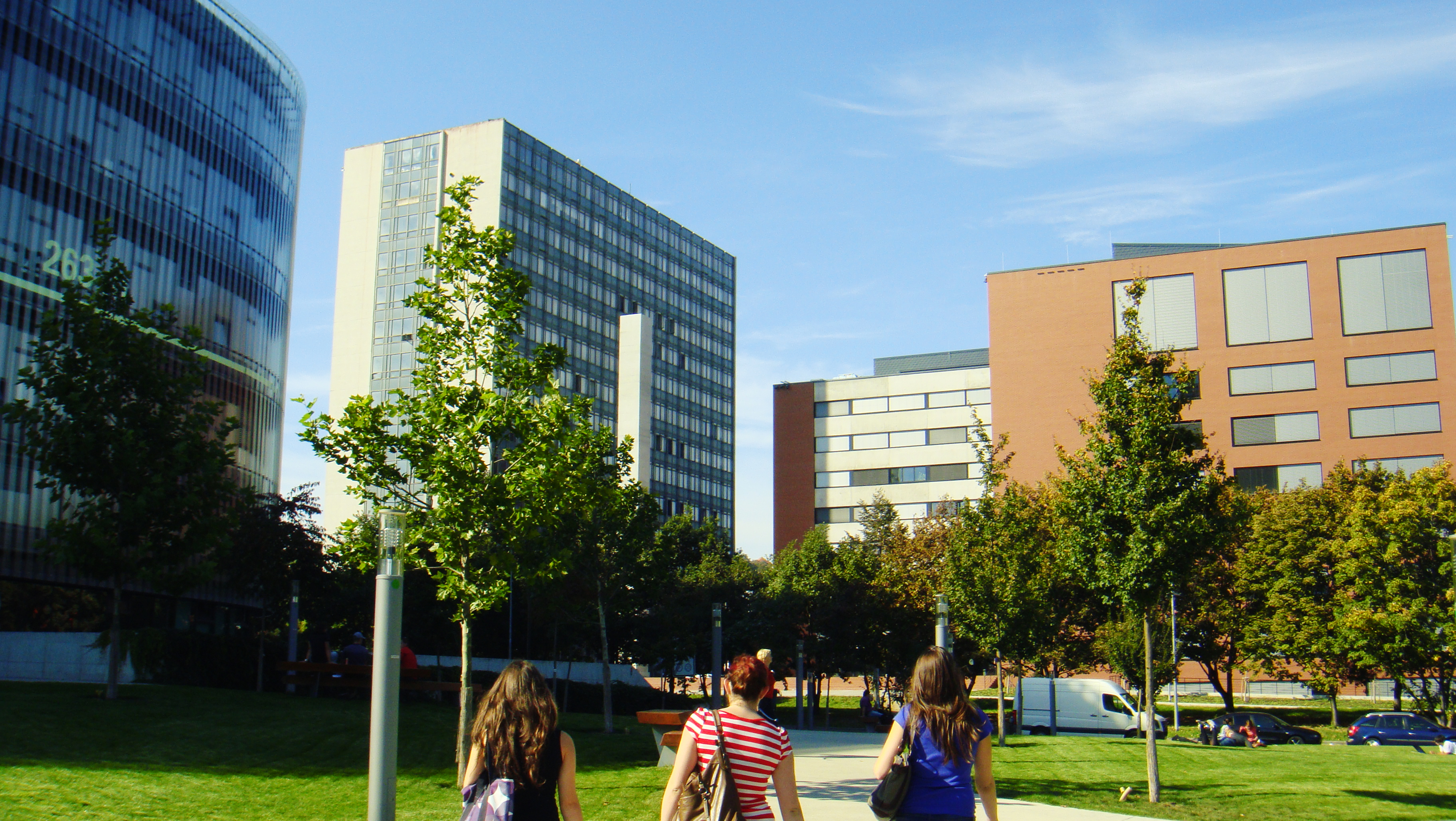
Dejvice campus - Library, FA, FIT

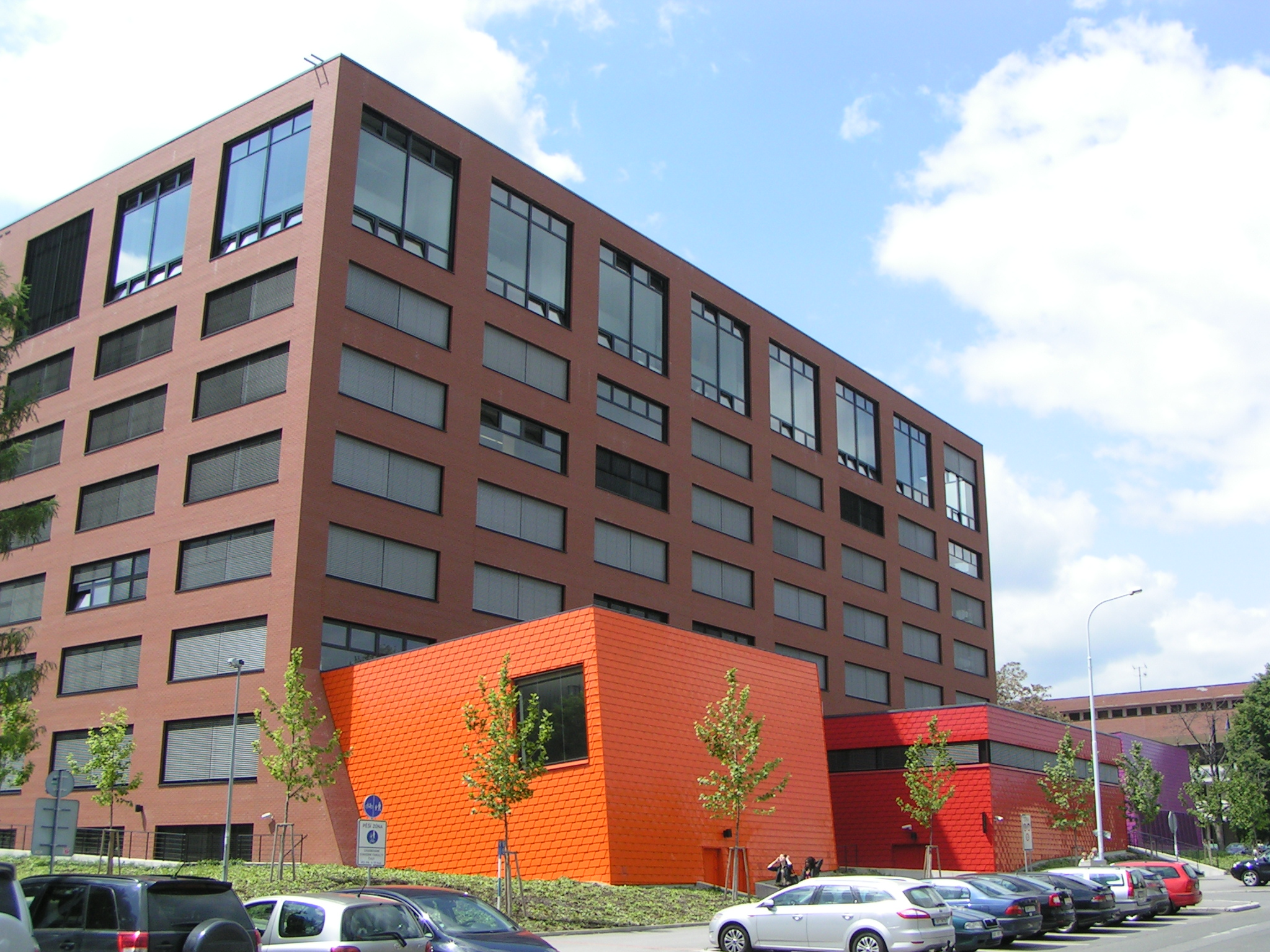
Lecture halls of FIT CTU.

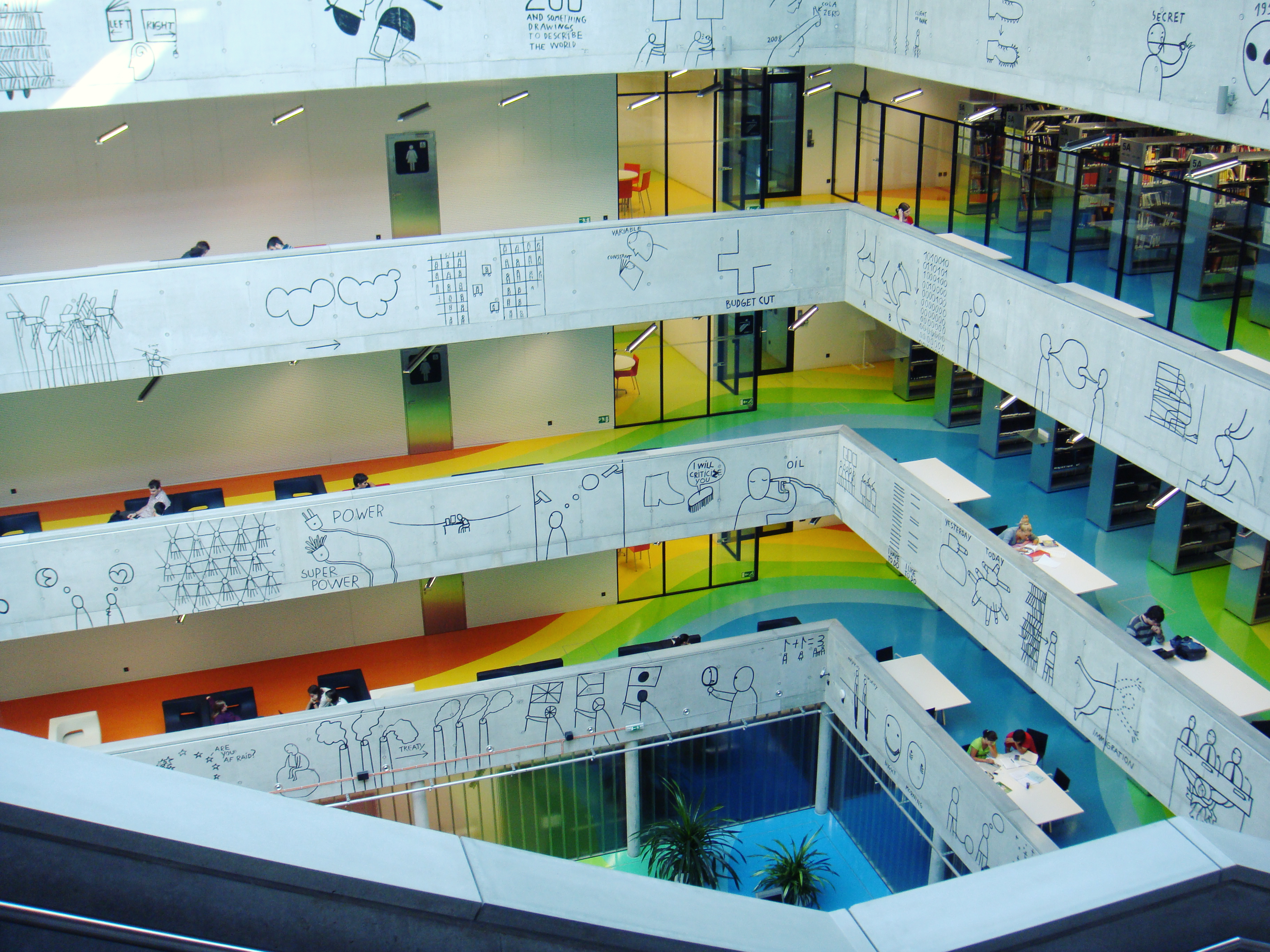
Interior of National Technical Library

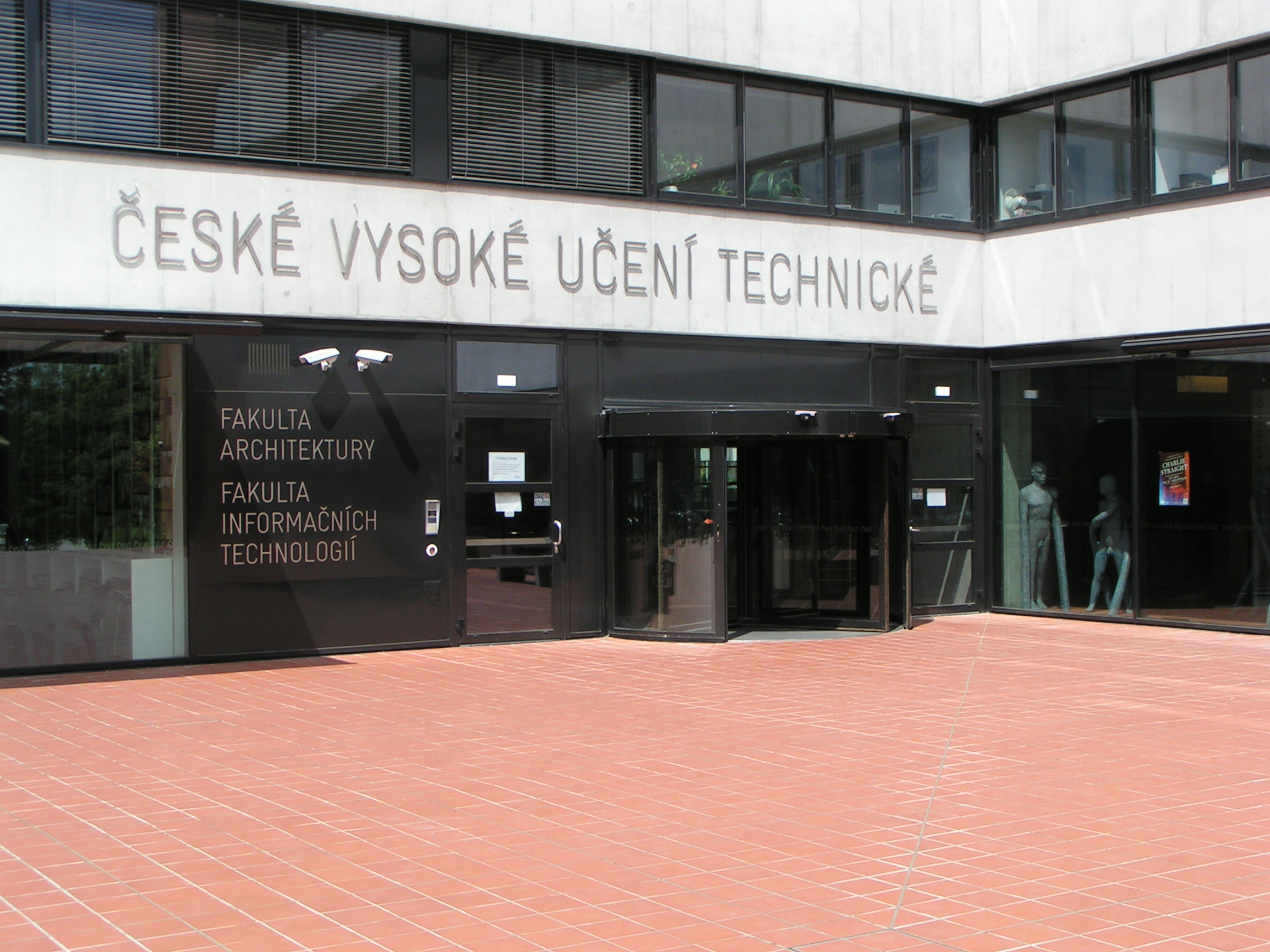
Entrance to the Faculty of Information Technology, Prague - Dejvice
