= Film School in Písek =

The Film Academy of Miroslav Ondříček in Písek
- Filmová akademie Miroslava Ondříčka v Písku
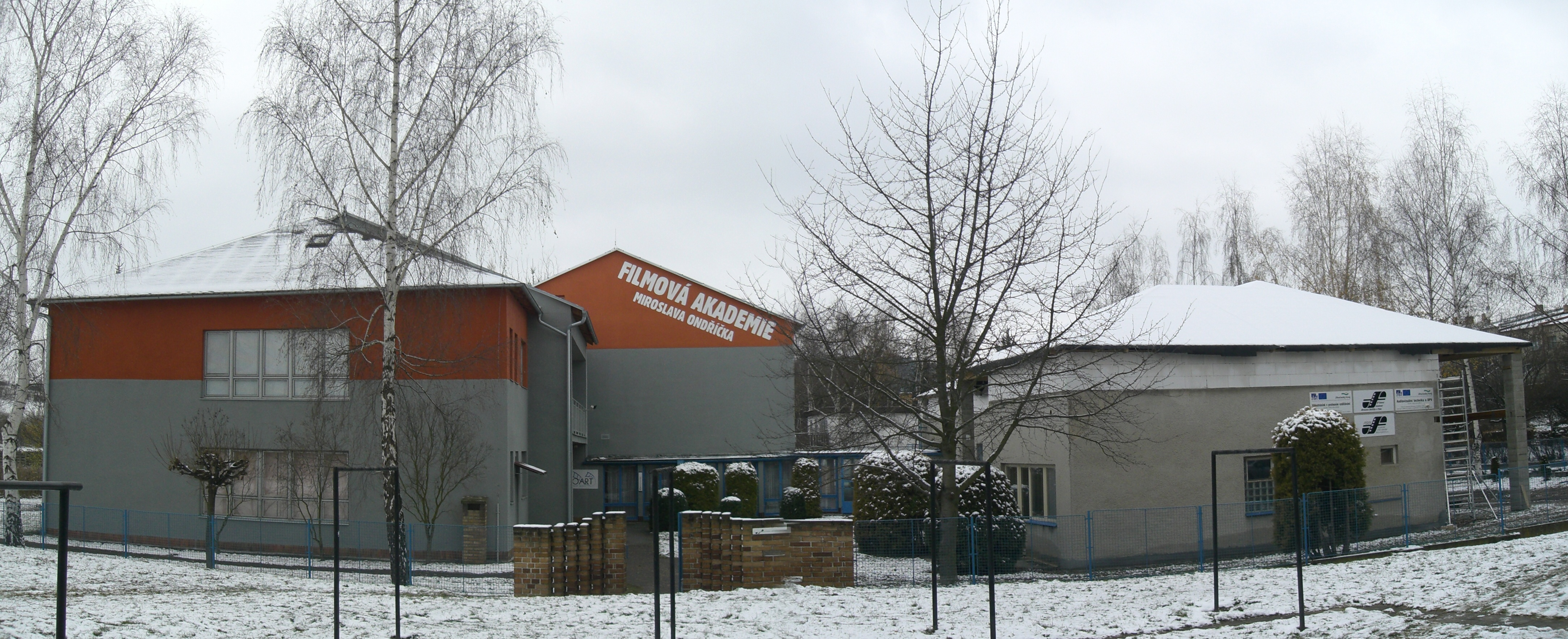
- Type: Private
- Established: 16 April 2004
- Location: Písek, Czech Republic; 49°18′1.68″N 14°8′38.29″E
- Website: https://filmovka.cz/ifs/
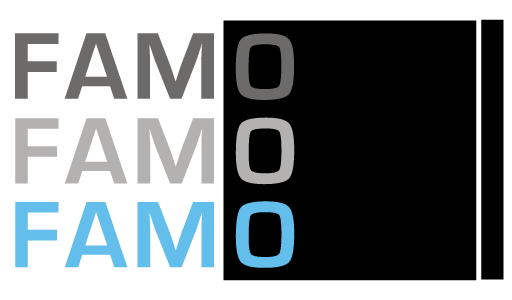

The Film Academy of Miroslav Ondříček in Písek (Czech: Filmová akademie Miroslava Ondříčka v Písku, FAMO) is a private film university which was established in 2004 by Czech documentary cameraman and school owner / director Miloň Terč. The patron of the school, and school name are dedicated to famous Czech cinematographer Miroslav Ondříček. The school offers accredited bachelor's and master's degree programs in the Czech and English languages.

== Location ==
FAMO's single campus and studios are located in Písek in the South Bohemian Region.

== Studies ==
Studies at the school take place in the field of audio-visual design, and students have the choice to major in:

- Directing
- Screenwriting and dramaturgy
- Documentary film
- Cinematography
- Editing
- Sound design
- Production
- Visual effects and animation
