= Game Page =

- Genre: Entertainment
- Presented by: Roman Zach
- Country of origin: Czech Republic
- Original language: Czech

Original release
- Network: ČT2
- Release: 1999 – 2012

Game Page was the first television show about video games in the Czech Republic. It was broadcast by Czech Television on ČT2 channel each Saturday.

First episode was broadcast on 5 January 1999 and the last on 30 June 2012. Runtime started on 9 minutes and was increased to 14 minutes and then 18 minutes.

The first host of the show was an actor Roman Zach, who was later replaced by Šárka Ullrichová.
