= Seznam Zprávy =

Czech news website

- Type: news website
- Format: Online newspaper
- Owner: Seznam.cz
- Editor: Robert Čásenský
- Launched: 4 October 2016; 9 years ago
- Language: Czech
- Website: www.seznamzpravy.cz

Seznam Zprávy is a Czech news website operated by Seznam.cz. Launched in October 2016, it covers domestic and international news, business, politics and current affairs, and also publishes investigative reporting, analysis and commentary.

== History ==
Seznam.cz launched Seznam Zprávy on 4 October 2016, with Jakub Unger as its first editor-in-chief. At launch, the newsroom had 34 journalists, including recruits from Economia, Mafra, Czech Television and Czech Radio. The service initially placed an emphasis on video journalism, and Seznam.cz built a television studio for its production.

The newsroom continued to expand after its launch and had about 50 employees by early 2017. Jiří Kubík succeeded Unger in 2019.

Robert Čásenský, founder of the magazine Reportér, became editor-in-chief in January 2025.

== Audience ==
According to NetMonitor, Seznam Zprávy was the most-visited Czech news website in 2023, with an average of about 4.66 million real users per month.

The Reuters Institute for the Study of Journalism found in 2026 that 49% of Czech respondents used Seznam Zprávy for online news each week, the highest share among the online news brands included in the survey.

In 2020, Seznam Zprávy won the news and current affairs category of the Křišťálová Lupa Czech Internet awards.

== See also ==
- Mass media in the Czech Republic
- Novinky.cz
