= Kepler Museum =

- Keplerovo muzeum
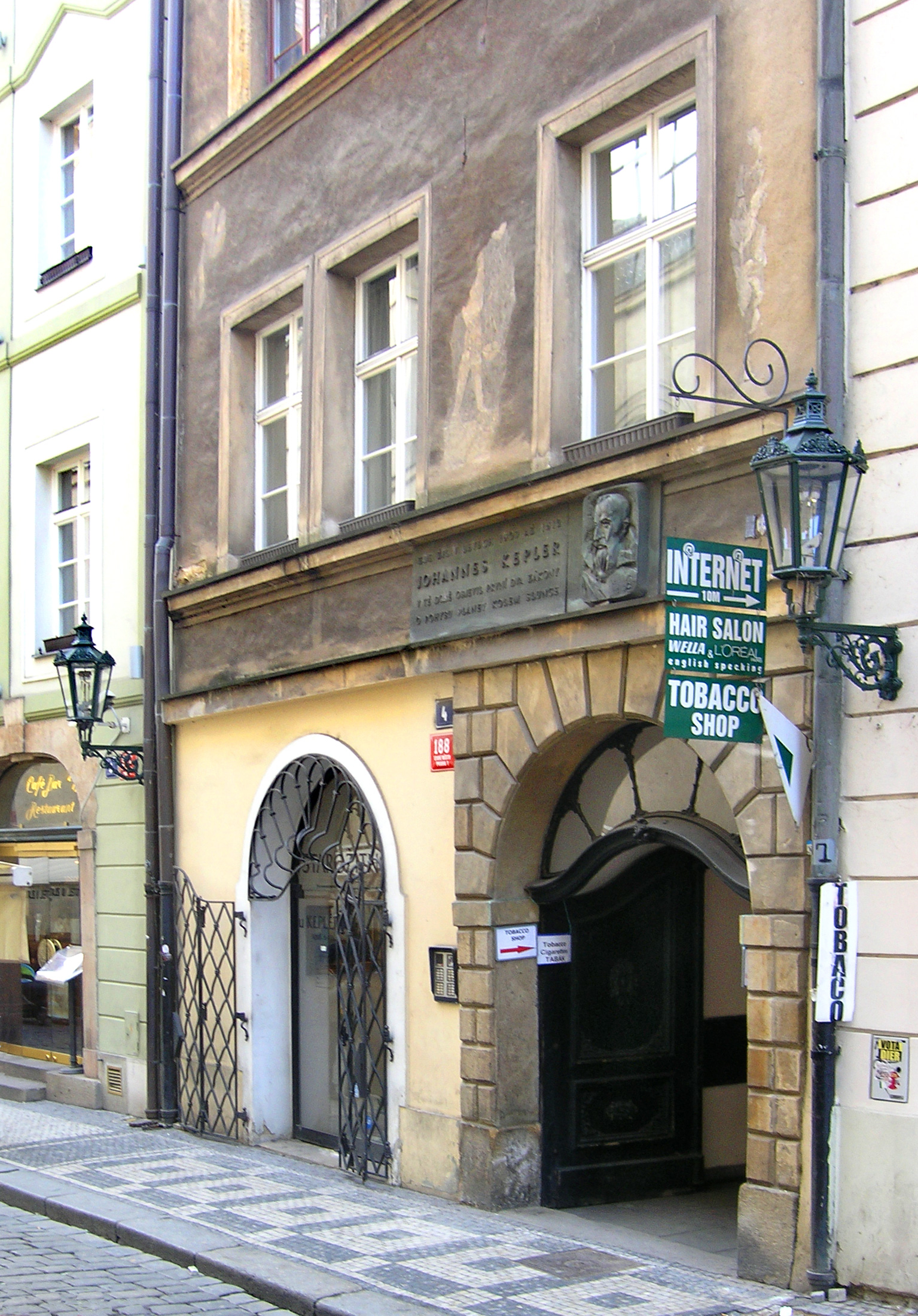
- Interactive fullscreen map
- Established: 2009; 17 years ago
- Dissolved: 2017; 9 years ago
- Location: Karlova 4-18, Prague 1, Czech Republic, 110 00
- Coordinates: 50°05′9.5″N 14°24′53.5″E
- Website: https://www.keplerovomuzeum.cz/

The Kepler Museum (Czech: Keplerovo muzeum) is a museum of astronomy in Prague, Czech Republic, named for the German astronomer Johannes Kepler. It was founded in 2009, the International Year of Astronomy, with financial support from the Magistrate of the Capital City of Prague and Agentura ProVas, professional and organisational support from the Czech Astronomical Society and using premises owned by Jitka Steinwaldová.

The Museum's graphic designers are Mrs. Lenka Kerelová, Ms. Kateřina Kerelová, and Mrs. Lenka Kotuláková. The Czech Astronomical Society is a scientific society established in 1917 and a member of the Council of Science Societies of the Academy of Sciences of the Czech Republic.

The three circles in the logo of the Kepler Museum represent the planet Mars, the Earth, and the Sun, the bodies whose mutual positions were studied by Johannes Kepler while he was in the city. The entrance tickets to the museum feature the astronomic dial of the Prague Astronomical Clock with the exact moment of entry to the museum, with the same data also expressed in the Old Bohemian and in the Babylonian manner. The sidereal time is also included. The original entrance ticket was designed by Vojtěch Sedláček, CEO of Agentura ProVás.

On 31 December 2017, the Kepler Museum in the Old Town closed after eight years, to be taken over by the National Technical Museum (NTM). The installation was transferred to the National Technical Museum and opened since spring of 2019.
