= Novinky.cz =

Czech news website

Novinky
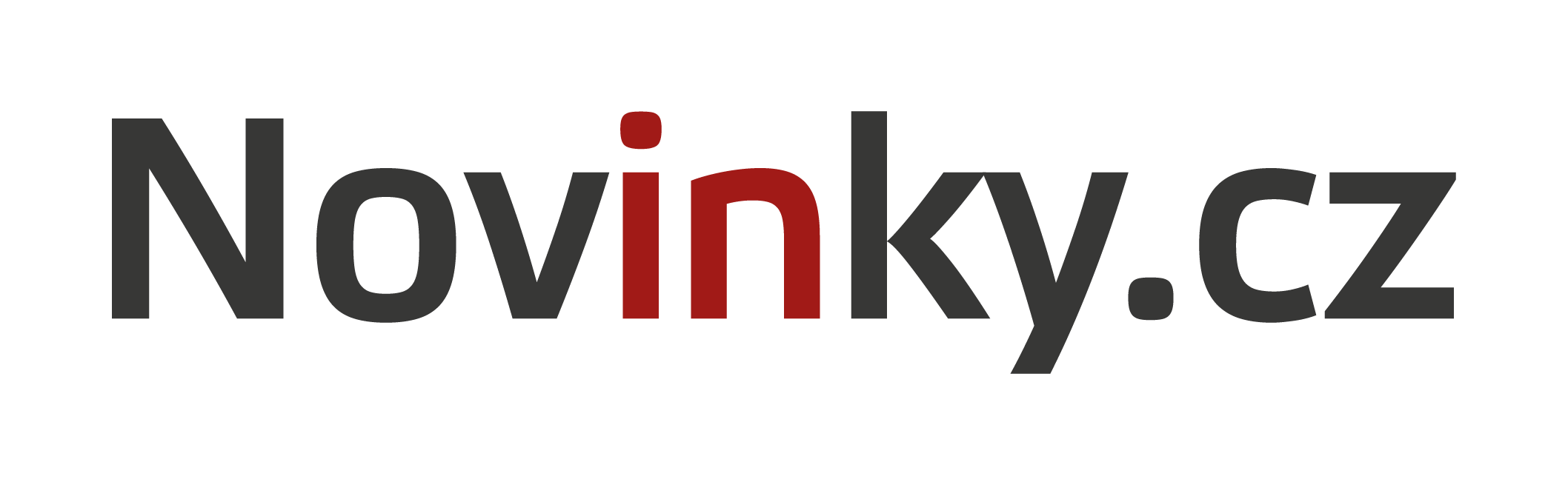
- Type: news website
- Format: Online newspaper
- Publisher: Borgis a.s.
- Editor-in-chief: Miroslav Benč
- Founded: 1998
- Language: Czech
- Website: www.novinky.cz

Novinky.cz is a Czech online news website owned and operated by Seznam.cz, with its editorial content supplied by Borgis, publisher of the daily newspaper Právo. The site originated in 1998 as an entertainment-oriented online magazine and was relaunched as a news service at the beginning of 2003 as a joint project of Seznam.cz and Borgis.

It has since become one of the most visited online news websites in the Czech Republic. In 2024, NetMonitor data ranked Novinky.cz first among Czech news websites by average monthly users.

== History ==
Novinky.cz was launched in May 1998 as an online magazine associated with Seznam.cz. The early site published entertainment and general-interest articles, many written by external contributors. Version from 1998 show its magazine-style format and calls for contributions from readers.

On 1 January 2003, Seznam.cz and Borgis relaunched Novinky.cz as a general news website. Borgis's existing FlashNews editorial team became part of the project and supplied its news content, while Seznam provided the online platform and distribution. The partnership combined Seznam's large internet audience with the newsroom resources of Borgis and Právo.

After about a decade of cooperation, Seznam.cz acquired a 33.6% stake in Borgis in July 2013. The companies also formalized their content-sharing arrangement, under which Borgis continued to provide news and other editorial material for Novinky.cz.

In 2023, Seznam.cz gained control of Borgis. The Czech Office for the Protection of Competition noted that Novinky.cz was already owned and operated by the Seznam group, while Borgis supplied its editorial content under a long-term agreement. By September 2024, Seznam.cz held 97.56% of Borgis.

Miroslav Benč became editor-in-chief of Novinky.cz in December 2025, succeeding Vladimír Dušánek.
