= Televize Seznam =

Czech television channel

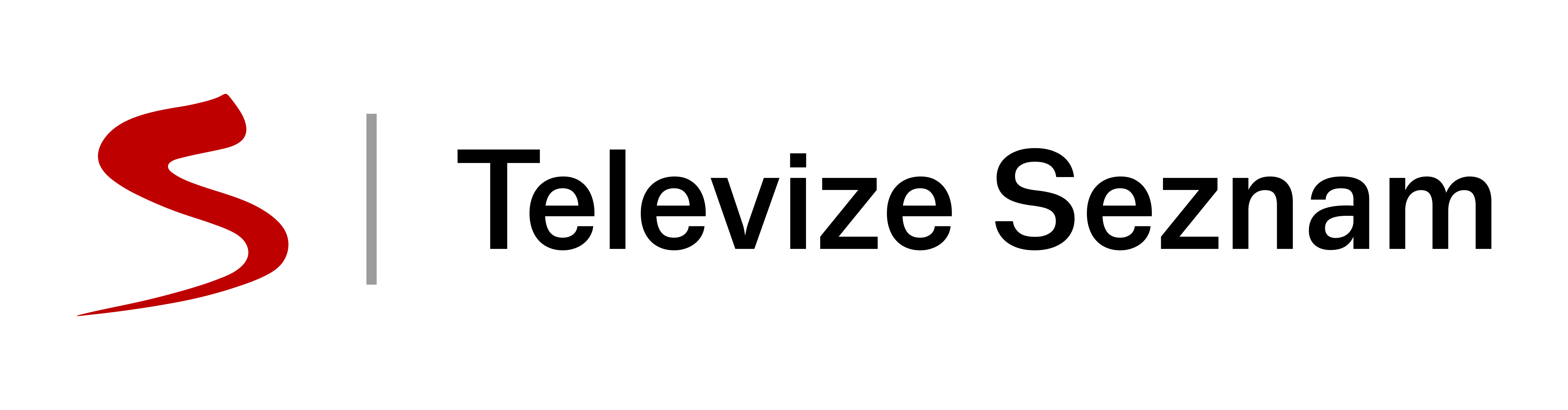
- Country: Czech Republic
- Broadcast area: Czechia

Programming
- Language: Czech

Ownership
- Owner: Seznam.cz

History
- Launched: 12 January 2018; 8 years ago

Links
- Website: Official website

Availability

Terrestrial
- DVB-T/T2: MUX 23 (FTA)

Televize Seznam (Seznam.cz TV) is a Czech full-format commercial television station offering nationwide broadcasting in the Czech Republic. Its director is Ivan Mikula, the operator of Seznam.cz is Ivo Lukačovič. It started broadcasting on January 12, 2018, at 7:00 a.m. and focuses mainly on documentaries, series and films, while also offering programs of its own creation originally broadcast on Seznam Zprávách or on its website. The title of the most-watched program was won by the fairy tale Give the Devil His Due, which had a share of 14.61% in the target group of 15–69 years on Christmas Day, which at the time represented an average viewership of 339,000 viewers. Right after it, the fairy tale film The Brave Blacksmith (13.45%) and Once Upon a Time, There Was a King...... (10.89%) were the most watched fairy tale films during the Christmas holidays. The first episode of the new TV series Seznam, entitled Revír, achieved an above-average share of 5.21% in the audience group 15–69 on Saturday, March 25. A total of 167,000 viewers over the age of 4 watched the start of the series. This is shown by the data of the official ATO-Nielsen Admosphere viewership measurement. The second episode broadcast subsequently on Televize Seznam gained a share of 4.32%* (CS 15–69).

== Program ==
Televize Seznam is a full-format television station. It focuses on Czech and foreign films and series. It also broadcasts of its own original programming, originally available only on the Stream.cz video portal.

In August 2018, the television presented a new broadcast schedule for autumn 2018. The broadcast was complemented by a new format from the world of business, Studio Byznys, and a sports show by the trio of presenters Luďek Mádl, Jiří Hošek and Jindřich Šídl. The weekend broadcast was expanded by a Friday block of independent films and a Sunday block of series. The Mysteries of Josef Klíma were also an important program.

Since 2018, the television station has been broadcasting a daily news summary called Večerní právy. The show lasted approximately 25 minutes and included news from home, abroad and from the world of sports. The editor-in-chief of the television news division is Pavel Cyprich. In February 2022, the television management presented a new studio, its architect is Jaroslav Holota. The visual appearance of television news has undergone many changes, including new graphic and musical equipment.

The first broadcast in this studio took place on February 14, 2022, the show was moderated by Barbora Hlaváčková with Pavel Cyprich. Other faces of the news review were Alexandr Komarnický, Žaneta Slámová, Martin Tyburec, Alžběta Kvitová and Jana Slavíková. Sports news is provided by Adam Kuřica and Kryštof Kousal.

Among the most popular creations of Televize Seznam is the comedy series Lajna from the hockey environment with Jiří Langmajer in the lead role. Ostrava director Vladimír Skórka has so far shot three series of eight episodes each. The third season of this series was watched by an average of 182,000 viewers in the 15+ category on Televize Seznam.

== Availability ==
The broadcast of Televize Seznam can be tuned into Multiplex 23, where it is available in HD quality. It is part of the offer of most satellite and cable TV signal providers Digi TV, Skylink and UPC. The spectrum is completed by several dozen IPTV providers, such as O2 TV, T-Mobile TV or Kuki, which distribute the TV signal over the Internet.
