= Seznam.cz =

Czech internet portal and search engine

Seznam.cz, a.s.
- Type: Joint-stock company
- Industry: Internet services
- Founded: 1996
- Founder: Ivo Lukačovič
- Headquarters: Prague, Czech Republic
- Area served: Primarily Czech Republic
- Key people: Ivo Lukačovič (founder and owner); Pavel Zima (senior executive)
- Products: Search engine, digital advertising, mapping, media services, online marketplaces
- Revenue: CZK 5.939 billion (2023)
- Operating income: 1,640,000,000 Czech koruna (2020)
- Net income: CZK 1.362 billion before tax (2023)
- Total assets: 3,443,000,000 Czech koruna (2020)
- Owner: Ivo Lukačovič
- Number of employees: 1,500–1,999 (2023)
- Parent: Masaryk Holding
- Website: www.seznam.cz

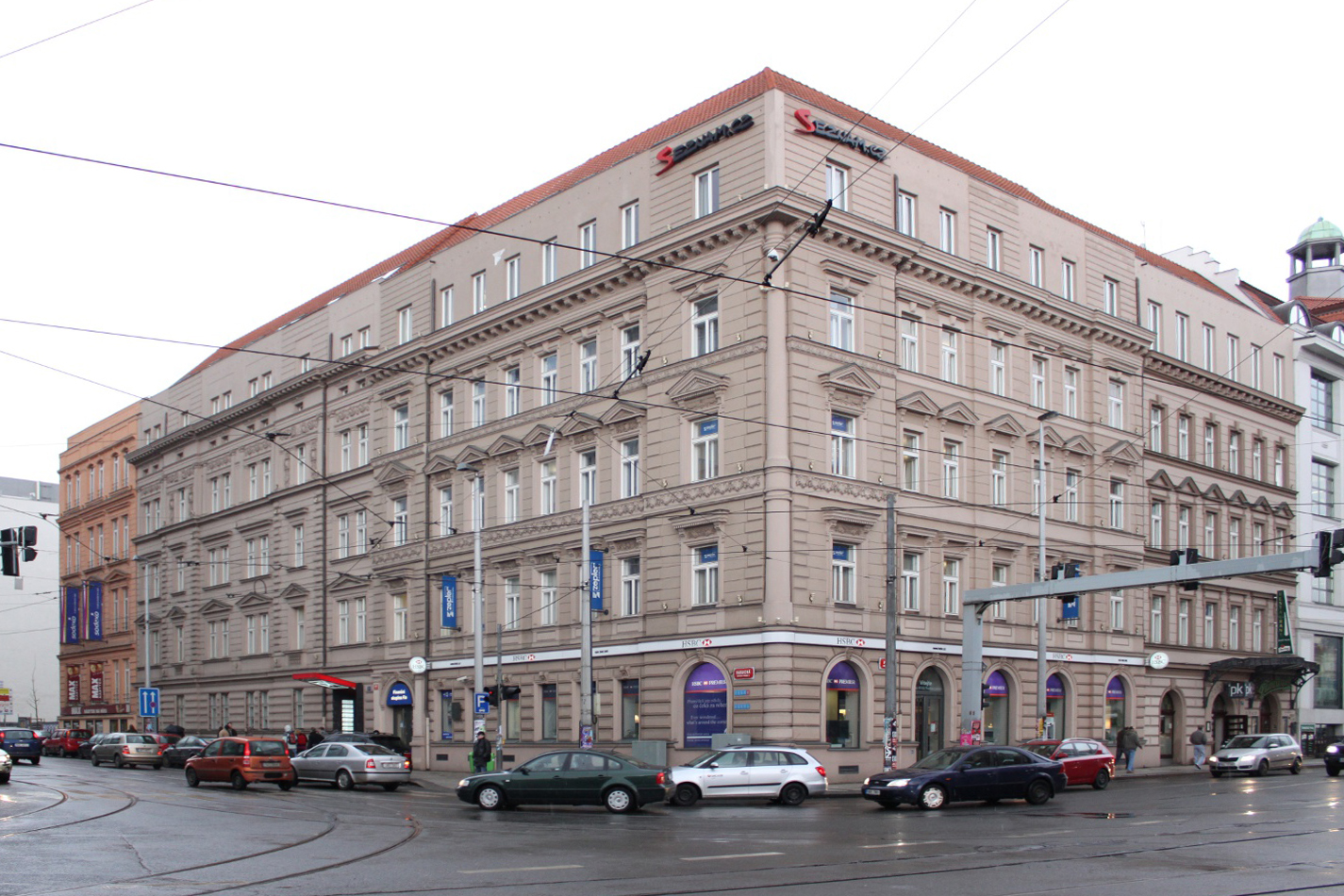
Seznam.cz headquarters in Prague

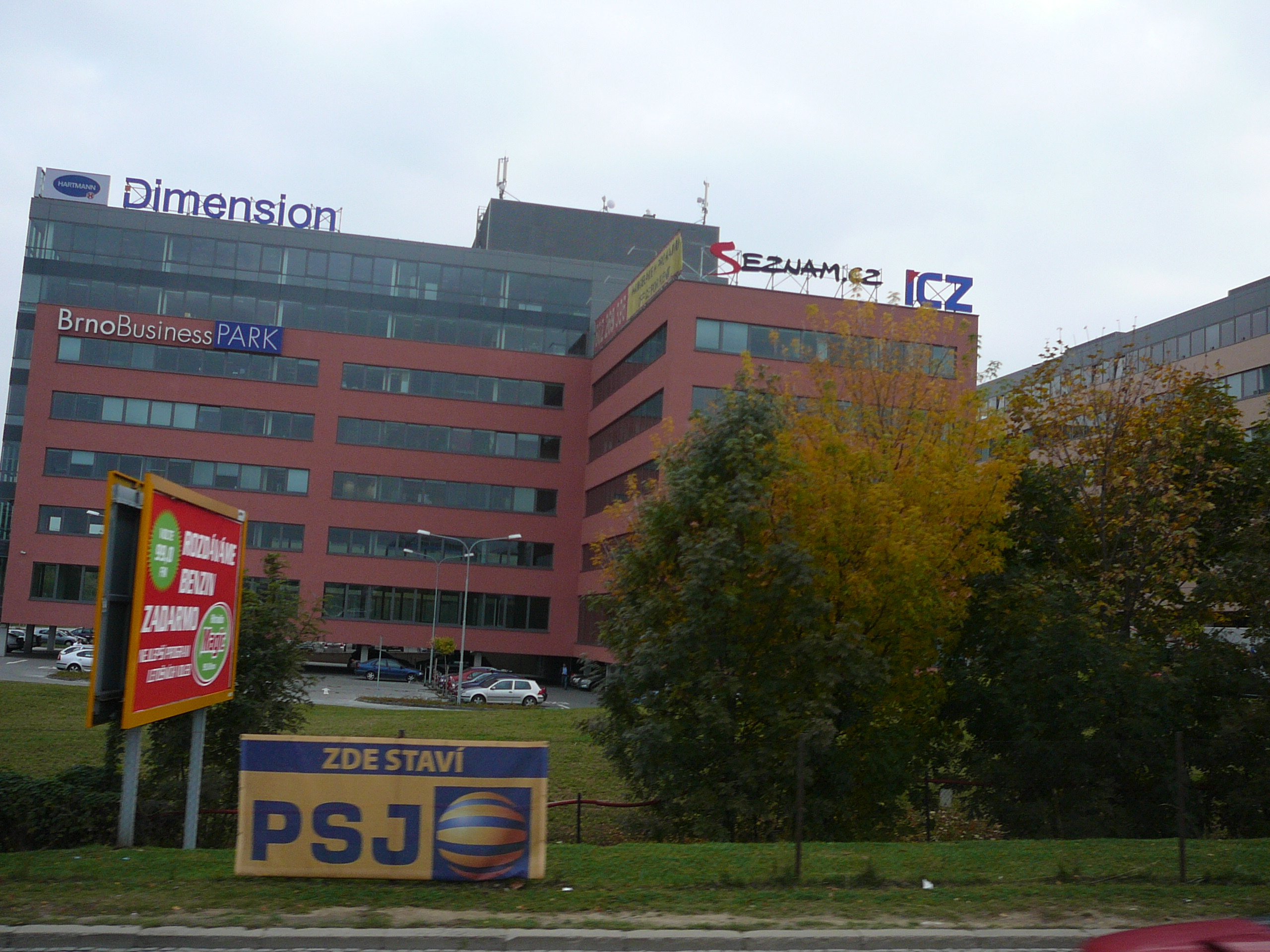
Seznam.cz branch in Brno-Štýřice

Seznam.cz (or Seznam, meaning "list" in Czech) is a Czech technology company that operates an internet portal, search engine, digital advertising platform, mapping service, media services, and online marketplaces. Founded in 1996 by Ivo Lukačovič in Prague, it began as an internet directory and search service and later expanded into a broader digital ecosystem.

The company's services include the Seznam.cz search engine, Mapy.com, email services, Seznam Zprávy, Stream.cz, advertising system Sklik, and specialised services such as Sreality.cz, Sauto.cz, Zboží.cz, and Firmy.cz. Seznam became one of the most significant Czech internet companies and was historically one of the few search engines outside the United States and China to maintain a substantial position against Google in its domestic market. It has maintained its importance through diversification into local-language content, mapping, advertising, and vertical online services.

== History ==
Seznam was founded in 1996 by Ivo Lukačovič in Prague as the first Czech internet directory and search engine. Lukačovič started the company with 50,000 Czech koruna from his own savings. In 1998, Seznam launched its email service using the @seznam.cz domain and gradually expanded into other online services, including news, weather, dictionaries, maps, and community features.

In 2000, Swedish internet company Spray International invested in Seznam, helping the company transition into a joint-stock company. Following the collapse of the dot-com bubble, plans for a possible public offering were abandoned. Lukačovič later regained a controlling position in the company and has remained its main shareholder.

In the early 2000s, Seznam used a full-text search technology developed by the Czech company Jyxo. In 2005, the company introduced its own search technology and acquired ATC, the operator of Email.cz. The acquisition expanded Seznam's email services, which were later integrated with its existing Seznam.cz email platform.

In 2006, Seznam entered a new phase of development as Ivo Lukačovič stepped back from day-to-day management and Pavel Zima became CEO. The company continued expanding its services, including through the acquisition of users of the Czech On Line portal's @post.cz email service. In this period, Seznam was the main competitor to Google in the Czech search market.

In 2007, Seznam acquired a 50% stake in Global Inspiration, the company operating the Czech online video platform Stream.cz, expanding its services into online video and original content. In 2011, Seznam acquired the remaining shares and became the sole owner of Stream.cz's operator.

Google gradually became the dominant search engine in the Czech Republic during the early 2010s. Instead of competing only in search, Seznam increasingly focused on building a wider digital ecosystem of Czech-language services.

Since 2016, Seznam has expanded its media activities through Seznam Zprávy, an online news outlet, and Televize Seznam, launched in 2018. Its mapping service Mapy.com (originally Mapy.cz) became one of its most important products, offering navigation, hiking, cycling, and outdoor mapping features. Seznam also operates specialised services such as Sreality.cz, Sauto.cz, Zboží.cz, and Firmy.cz, which support its broader advertising and marketplace ecosystem.

In 2022, Seznam adopted the IndexNow protocol to allow websites to notify search engines about content changes more efficiently.

== Services ==
Seznam.cz operates a portfolio of internet services focused primarily on Czech-language users. Its services include search, digital advertising, mapping, communication, media, and online marketplaces.

Selected Seznam services
Service	Category	Description
Seznam.cz	Portal and search	Main web portal and search engine
Seznam Email	Communication	Email service
Sklik	Advertising	Online advertising platform
Firmy.cz	Business services	Business directory and listings
Mapy.com (formerly Mapy.cz)	Maps and navigation	Mapping and navigation service with route planning, hiking, cycling and outdoor features
Seznam Zprávy	Media	Online news service
Novinky.cz	Media	News portal operated with Borgis
Sport.cz	Media	Sports news portal
Super.cz	Media	Entertainment news portal
Stream.cz	Media	Video platform and original content service
Televize Seznam	Media	Television and online broadcasting service
Sreality.cz	Marketplace	Real estate marketplace
Sauto.cz	Marketplace	Vehicle marketplace
Zboží.cz	Marketplace	Shopping comparison service
Sbazar.cz	Marketplace	Classified advertisements
Volná místa.cz	Marketplace	Jobs portal
Lidé.cz	Community	Social networking and community service
Počasí.cz	Weather	Weather forecasts
Seznam Slovník	Language	Online dictionary service

Seznam has also operated several community and portal services that were later discontinued, such as Spolužáci.cz (a platform for classmates).

== Search technology ==
Seznam operates its own search engine technology and uses its own web ranking system known as S-Rank, which evaluates websites on a scale from 0 to 10 and serves as an indicator of website importance.

== See also ==
- Comparison of search engines
- List of search engines
- Timeline of web search engines
