= List of massacres in the Czech Republic =

The following tables include the incidents that occurred in the territory of the present-day Czech Republic in which the killing of more than five non-combatant people (unarmed civilians, prisoners, or prisoners of war) took place.

== Massacres before the Hussite Wars (up until the year 1419) ==
The following is a list of massacres and antisemitic pogroms that occurred in the territory of the present-day Czech Republic before the year 1419:

Name	Date	Location	Deaths	Notes
Prague 1096 Pogrom	June 30, 1096	Prague	Several hundred	Part of the massacres committed during the First Crusade; the victims were Jewish; the precise number of victims is unknown.
Moravia 1096 Pogroms	July 1096	several towns in Moravia	Unknown	Part of the massacres committed during the First Crusade; the victims were Jewish; the precise number of victims is unknown.
Prague 1161 Pogrom	1161	Prague	85	85 Jews were burned to death outside the city gate to Vysehrad after accusations of poisoning wells, water sources, and even the air within houses. Their ashes were thrown in the Moldau river and the city's Synagogue was destroyed.
Prague 1389 Pogrom	April 18, 1389	Prague	More than 3,000	The victims were Jewish. The massacre took place on Saturday before Easter in the absence of King Wenceslaus IV of Bohemia from the city. Most sources say more than 3,000 (of a Jewish community of 4,000) were killed (some sources estimate 400–500); Gaon Avigdor Karo (Abigedor Ḳara), a poet and scholar of the kaballah, composed an elegy to commemorate the tragedy which was incorporated into the Selichot or communal prayers recited during the Jewish High Holidays and on Jewish fast days.

== Massacres during the Hussite Wars (1419 to c. 1434) ==
The following massacres and antisemitic pogroms occurred in the territory of the present-day Czech Republic during the Hussite Wars of 1419–c. 1434. During these wars, many atrocities were committed by both Hussites and Catholics. Most Hussites were ethnic Czechs, but there were also German and Polish adherents of this movement. On the other side, most Catholics involved in this conflict were ethnic Germans, but Hungarian, Czech, and Polish Catholics were also killed during the fights and massacres. Jews who sided with the reformer Jan Hus were also victimized during this period. Many killings of the Hussite Wars took place outside the borders of today's Czech Republic; they are not included here.

Name	Date	Location	Deaths	Notes
Prague 1421 Pogrom	1421	Prague	unknown	The Jewish quarter of Prague was looted and many Jews were killed. The pogrom seems to have taken place early in 1421, as sources relate that it happened soon after the battle of Vysehrad which ended on November 1, 1420.
Lipany 1434 Killing of Surrendered Hussite Soldiers	1434, May 30	Lipany	about 700	After the defeat of the radical Hussites or Taborites in the battle of Lipany, about 700 ordinary soldiers who surrendered after promises of renewed military service were burned to death in nearby barns. Almost all of the victims were ethnic Czechs.

== Massacres between 1436 and 1900 ==
The following is a list of massacres and pogroms that occurred in the territory of the present-day Czech Republic between the years 1436 and 1900:

Name	Date	Location	Deaths	Notes
Prague 1483 Pogrom	1483	Prague	unknown	The victims were Jewish.
Massacre in Běchovice	June 17, 1848	Prague	7 (at least) were killed.	At least 50 were injured; this massacre was part of the Revolutions of 1848 in the Austrian Empire.

== Massacres between 1900 and 1939 ==
The following is a list of massacres and pogroms that occurred in the territory of the present-day Czech Republic during the 20th century, but before World War II:

Name	Date	Location	Deaths	Notes
Massacre in Kadaň (Massaker von Kaaden)	4 March 1919	Kadaň	17	25 were killed (including those of about 70 injured who later died); part of the 4th of March general strike in World War I and its aftermath in the German provinces.
Massacre in Šternberk (Massaker von Sternberg)	4 March 1919	Šternberk	15	Part of the 4th of March general strike in World War I and its aftermath in the German provinces.
Frývaldov strike (Freiwaldau strike)	25 November 1931	Dolní Lipová	8	At least 13 more were injured; part of the Great Depression strike movement.

== Massacres during World War II ==
The following is a list of massacres and pogroms that occurred in the territory of the present-day Czech Republic in the time of Nazi Occupation of Czechoslovakia, until the end of World War II on May 8, 1945. The only exception is the biggest single-day mass murder of Czech citizens in history, which was committed at the Theresienstadt family camp at Auschwitz II-Birkenau in modern-day Poland, on March 8–9, 1944. There were also single-day mass murders of Czech citizens in the Nazi concentration camps outside the Czech lands, such as in Maly Trostenets, 28 August 1942 (999 killed); Riga, 28 August 1942 (1001 killed); Mauthausen, 24 October 1942 (262 killed); Mauthausen, 10 April 1945 (235 killed) etc. If not stated otherwise, the victims were of Czech ethnicity.

Name	Date	Location	Deaths	Notes
17 November Raid against universities and colleges	17 November 1939	Prague	9	Nine student leaders were executed and about 1500 students were sent to concentration camps, where 35 were executed or died later; part of the German occupation of Czechoslovakia.
First Martial Law (First Heydrichiada)	28 September 1941 – 19 January 1942	Prague	247 killed outright	The complete toll has been estimated at 1500, including those executed and other deaths in concentration camps; the victims were of various ethnicities, mostly Czech civilians and Czech Jews; part of the German occupation of Czechoslovakia and the Holocaust.
First Martial Law (First Heydrichiada)	28 September 1941 – 19 November 1941	Brno	239 killed outright	The complete death toll has been estimated at 1000, including those executed and other deaths in concentration camps); the victims were Czech citizens and Czech Jews; part of German occupation of Czechoslovakia and the Holocaust.
Massacre in Lidice	10 June 1942	Lidice	181	172 men were shot in Lidice, nine more men from Lidice shot in Prague. Complete toll at least 318, with 52 women and 85 children from Lidice being killed in concentration camps, older sources claim 340; part of the German occupation of Czechoslovakia.
Massacre in Ležáky	24 June 1942	Ležáky	33 killed outright	The complete toll has been estimated at 44, including deaths in concentration camps; part of the German occupation of Czechoslovakia.
Liquidation of the Theresienstadt concentration camp	8–9 March 1944	Auschwitz-Birkenau	3,792	The victims were Czech Jews; approximately 144,000 Jews, most of then Czech citizens, were sent to Theresienstadt concentration camp; about a quarter of the inmates (33,000) died in Theresienstadt. When the camp was liquidated, inmates were sent to Poland; although the Polish killings were committed outside the territory of the Czech Republic, this was the largest mass murder of Czech citizens in history; part of the Holocaust; see also the History of the Jews in Czechoslovakia.
Massacre in Životice	6 August 1944	Životice	36 killed outright	The complete toll was 44, including deaths in concentration camps; the victims were 35 ethnic Poles, 8 Czechs and one German; part of the German occupation of Czechoslovakia.
Massacre of downed American airmen	9 December 1944	Kaplice	5	Five downed American pilots, all of whom were unarmed and had surrendered, were murdered by Karl Lindemeyer and Franz Strasser. Lindemeyer killed himself on 8 May 1945. Strasser was arrested by U.S. officials and put on trial for war crimes. He was found guilty of shooting two of the airmen, sentenced to death, and hanged on 10 December 1945.
Transport of Death	24 January 1945	Brandýs nad Orlicí	18	The victims were of various ethnicities; part of the Nazi Death Marches of the Holocaust.
Transport of Death	13–14 April 1945	Stod	241	The victims were of various ethnicities; part of the Nazi Death Marches of the Holocaust.
Massacre in Jablunkov	13 April 1945	Jablunkov	12	The victims were Polish prisoners murdered by the Gestapo; part of the German occupation of Czechoslovakia.
Transport of Death	15 April 1945	Nýřany	about 100	The victims were of various ethnicities; part of the Nazi Death Marches of the Holocaust.
Killing in the Mikulov clay pit	15 April 1945	Mikulov	21	This was the mass murder of Hungarian Jewish prisoners working in a clay pit; part of the Holocaust.
Murder in Gästehaus	17 April 1945	Kyjov	7 killed outright	The complete death toll was 9, including two men subsequently shot on the street; part of the German occupation of Czechoslovakia.
Massacre in Ploština	19 April 1945	Ploština	24 killed outright	The complete death toll was 28, including subsequent executions; part of the German occupation of Czechoslovakia.
Massacre in Zákřov	20 April 1945	Zákřov	19	Part of the German occupation of Czechoslovakia.
Court-martial in Medlánky	21 April 1945	Brno-Medlánky	15	Part of the German occupation of Czechoslovakia.
Massacre in Prlov	23 April 1945	Prlov	19 killed outright	The complete death toll was 23, including subsequent executions; part of the German occupation of Czechoslovakia.
Massacre near Salaš	29 April 1945	Bunč	21	Part of the German occupation of Czechoslovakia.
Massacre near Suchý	30 April 1945	Suchý	10	Part of the German occupation of Czechoslovakia.
Massacre in Letovice	May (?) 1945	Letovice	19	The bodies of 19 murdered German Gestapo prisoners of war were discovered on 15 May 1945; part of the German occupation of Czechoslovakia.
Last execution in Theresienstadt	2 May 1945	Theresienstadt	52	At the request of Karl Hermann Frank, the "most dangerous" political prisoners were murdered; the majority of the victims were Czech communists; part of the German occupation of Czechoslovakia and the Holocaust.
Execution in Lazce	2 May 1945	Olomouc-Lazce	23	21 participants or hostages captured during the uprising in Přerov and 2 local members of the resistance were killed; part of the German occupation of Czechoslovakia.
Execution in Fort XIII	2 May 1945	Olomouc-Nová ulice	17	Captured participants of the uprising in Přerov and hostages were murdered; part of the German occupation of Czechoslovakia.
Transport of Death	3–6 May 1945	Olbramovice	82	The victims were of various ethnicities; part of the Nazi Death Marches of the Holocaust.
Death March	4–6 May 1945	Podbořany-Kaštice	268 killed outright	The complete death toll was about 600, including those killed outright and those who died on the way from Johanngeorgenstadt to Lovosice); the victims were of various ethnicities; part of the Nazi Death Marches of the Holocaust.
Massacre in Javoříčko	5 May 1945	Javoříčko	38	Part of German occupation of Czechoslovakia.
Brandýs Tragedy	5 May 1945	Brandýs nad Orlicí	15	Part of the German occupation of Czechoslovakia.
Death March of Volary	6 May 1945	Volary	95–217	All of the victims were women, most of them Hungarian Jews. When the march departed from Helmbrechts concentration camp in Germany on 13 April 1945, it comprised 1167 women, 577 of them Jewish and 590 non-Jewish, including 25 German Christian women, all of whom survived. The complete death toll seems to be at least 217 (including about 123 who were killed or perished in Germany before the march passed the border on April 14 near Aš/Asch); 59 of the victims were shot and 158 perished from exhaustion; part of the Nazi Death Marches of the Holocaust.
Massacre in Velké Meziříčí	6 May 1945	Velké Meziříčí	58 killed outright	The complete death toll was 60, including subsequent executions; part of German occupation of Czechoslovakia.
Massacre in Leskovice	6 May 1945	Leskovice	18	The complete death toll was 26, including 8 insurgents executed or killed in a fight on the previous day; the German SS commander responsible for the massacre of civilians was Walter Hauck; part of German occupation of Czechoslovakia.
Massacre in Prague, Úsobská street	6 May 1945	Prague	51	Part of the Prague uprising.
Massacre in Psáry	6 May 1945	Psáry	13	Part of the Prague uprising.
Massacre near Lednice	7 May 1945	A village near Lednice (German: Eisgrub)	22	Both perpetrators and victims were German. 22 German soldiers were shot as alleged deserters without any trial; the killing was personally ordered by Marshal Ferdinand Schörner.
Kolín massacre	7 May 1945	Kolín	13–16	Part of the German occupation of Czechoslovakia. Ordered by Paul Hermann Feustel.
Massacre in Třešť	7 May 1945	Třešť	34	Part of the German occupation of Czechoslovakia.
Massacre in Velké Popovice	7 May 1945	Velké Popovice	29	Part of the German occupation of Czechoslovakia.
Massacre in Lahovice	7 May 1945	Prague-Lahovice	21	Part of the Prague uprising.
Czech Hell	7 –11 May 1945	Prague	500–1,000	Hundreds of Estonian Waffen-SS troops of the 20th Waffen Grenadier Division of the SS (1st Estonian) were massacred by partisans; part of the Prague uprising
Massacre in Masarykovo nádraží	8 May 1945	Prague	53	The station was captured by the Waffen-SS and 53 surrendered resistance fighters and non-combatants were massacred. Part of the Prague uprising.
Massacre in Trhová Kamenice	8 May 1945	Trhová Kamenice	13	Part of the German occupation of Czechoslovakia.
Malín tragedy	8 May 1945	Kutná Hora-Malín	11	a group of SS arrived from Kolín and invaded 2 houses and executed 11 people. Part of the German occupation of Czechoslovakia.

== Massacres after World War II up until communist takeover on 25 February 1948 ==
The following is a list of massacres that occurred in the territory of the present-day Czech Republic between 9 May 1945 and 25 February 1948 (the day of the communist takeover):

Name	Date	Location	Deaths	Notes
Killing of Germans in Bartolomějská ulice	8 May 1945	Prague, Old Town	9	9 Germans were slain in the Old Town of Prague, (Barthomoläusgasse/Bartolomějská ulice no. 9) in the afternoon of May 8. Three of them were soldiers of the Wehrmacht; part of the aftermath of the Prague uprising.
Massacre of Germans in Bořislavka(cz)	9 May 1945	Prague-Bořislavka	41	Part of the aftermath of the Prague uprising; the killing of these Germans was ordered by an unidentified person wearing the uniform of a Soviet officer.
Burning of Lejčkov	9 May 1945	Lejčkov, Dolní Hořice	24	Part of the German occupation of Czechoslovakia; this massacre was committed by German troops after the German surrender.
Massacre in Běloves	9 May 1945	Náchod	9	Part of the German occupation of Czechoslovakia; this massacre was committed by Waffen-SS troops one whole day after the German surrender came into force.
Liquidation of soldiers of the Vlasov army	after 9 May 1945	Prague	about 200	The victims were Russians. On the morning of 9 May 1945, Soviet Red Army troops conquered Prague. Very soon afterwards, about 200 members of the Nazi German collaborationist Russian Liberation Army or Vlasov Army, who had remained in the city, were shot by the Soviets as traitors to Russia. The complete death toll among the "Vlasovci" was much higher, with many of them being killed elsewhere.
Killings in Prague's Strahov Stadium	May/June 1945	Prague-Strahov	several hundred	After 8 May 1945, several thousand Germans were interned in Prague's largest stadium for several weeks under extreme conditions. There were repeated executions without trial and high mortality due to a lack of food and shelter; according to the report of a German physician, a total of 25,000 people were arrested there. In the beginning most of the inmates were disarmed German soldiers, after the middle of May most were civilians. The stadium had an average occupancy of about 9,000 persons and several hundred were killed or perished. The stadium was used as a camp at least until 19 June 1945. Part of the expulsion of Germans from Czechoslovakia.
Massacre in Lanškroun	17–21 May 1945	Lanškroun (German: Landskron)	at least 51	The victims were Germans; part of the expulsion of Germans from Czechoslovakia.
Massacre in Německý Šicndorf	19 May 1945	Dobronín (German: Dobrenz)	13–15 or more	The victims were Germans, slain with hoes and shovels; part of the expulsion of Germans from Czechoslovakia. The mass grave was examined by Czech police in 2010; they found at least 13 human bodies. Survivors claimed that there had been several dozen victims; in May 2011 Czech police found another mass grave nearby.
Hanke Lager Massacres	27 May – 12 June 1945	Ostrava (German: Mährisch Ostrau)	231	The victims were German civilians from Ostrava and the surrounding area; most were killed by hanging, several were tortured to death. Massacres happened on 27 May (6 killed), 28 May (18 killed), 29 May (17), 30 May (28) 1 June (12), 3 June (14), 4 June (23), 8 June (18), 9 June (26), 12 June (32). After that the guards were exchanged by Czech authorities and only 5 more people died until 3 July. All victims are known by full name, the event is well documented by Czech historians whose post-1990 findings confirm earlier Sudeten German information.
Killings in Ivančice	May / June 1945	Ivančice (German: Eibenschütz)	30–35	The "Josef Hybeš" Czech partisan group, under the command of A. Řepka, killed 30 to 35 Germans and alleged Czech collaborators of Nazi Germany. 18 of them were executed after the trial of a "revolutionary people's court" on 10 May 1945; 10 names are documented by a German source, 17 names from Czech documents.
Brno Death March	from 30 May to June 1945	Brno (German: Brünn) and villages south of the city	estimated range from 647 to about 4,140	According to Czech historians, 649 Germans were killed or perished on Czech (Moravian) soil and another estimated 1,050 died in Austria as a consequences of the death march. Austrian researchers claimed 1,950 victims of the march itself, 2,000 victims in the Pohořelice camp and another 190 victims in surrounding villages. In total 4,140 German victims from Brno. plus 1,062 who died in Austria.
Executions in Nový Bor	2 June 1945	Nový Bor	7	The victims were Germans; the complete death toll was 8, including one German bystander killed during the executions; the families of the victims were forced to move behind nearby German borders; part of the expulsion of Germans from Czechoslovakia
Massacres in Tocov	2, 3 and 5 June 1945	Tocov (German: Totzau)	31	The victims were Germans; three massacres took place: on 2 June, five were killed), during the night of 2 June to 3 June, six were killed) and on June 5, 20 were shot. part of the expulsion of Germans from Czechoslovakia; the event was examined in 1999 by German and Czech prosecutors, who confirmed the facts and identified the perpetrators.
Massacre in Postoloprty	3–7 June 1945	Postoloprty (German: Postelberg)	at least 730	The victims were German men and boys; 822 men from Postoloprty were reported missing after 7 June 1945; in 1947 a total of 763 bodies were found in Postoloprty; part of the expulsion of Germans from Czechoslovakia, but some of the mass graves were attributed to the earlier Nazi Death Marches of the Holocaust.
Massacre in Podbořany	7 June 1945	Podbořany (German: Podersam)	68	The victims were male German civilians; part of the expulsion of Germans from Czechoslovakia. The names of all of the victims and most of the perpetrators are known and so are the sites of two mass graves with 32 and 36 bodies, which were investigated by Czechoslovak authorities in 1947. The event is well documented by Czech and German authors, among them Ota Filip.
Massacre in Švédské Šance	18–19 June 1945	Přerov (German: Prerau)	265	The victims were ethnic Germans from Slovakia; one Slovak woman and her boy were spared, the German father was shot; part of the expulsion of Germans from Czechoslovakia. The leading perpetrator of the massacre, Karol Pazúr, was arrested and court-martialed for his involvement. In January 1949, he was sentenced to 7.5 years in prison, which was increased to 20 years on appeal. However, in 1951, Pazúr was released early due to a presidential amnesty. He died from liver cirrhosis on 25 April 1976, at the age of 59.
Massacre at Buková hora(cz)	30 June 1945	Teplice nad Metují	23	The victims were Germans; women, children, and old men were marched to the border to be expelled; as Polish authorities refused thementry, the Germans were killed; part of the expulsion of Germans from Czechoslovakia
Ústí massacre	31 July 1945	Ústí nad Labem (German: Aussig)	43–2800	The victims were Germans; the official Czechoslovak investigation confirmed 43 people had been killed, but the actual number is estimated at least 100; part of the expulsion of Germans from Czechoslovakia. Before 1990, Sudeten German organisations were claiming 600–2800 victims, or sometimes "thousands."

== Massacres during the communist rule (1948–1989) ==
The following is a list of massacres that occurred in the territory of the present-day Czech Republic between 1948 and 1989:

Name	Date	Location	Deaths	Notes
Slánsky Trial	3 December 1952	Prague	11	Eleven leading members of the Communist Party of Czechoslovakia were executed by hanging and three more were sentenced to life imprisonment after an openly antisemitic eight-day show trial inspired by Stalin; 11 of the 14 defendants were of Jewish origin; all 14 defendants were rehabilitated between 1960 and 1963 after internal Czechoslovak investigations (published only much later).
Jeseník tragedy(cz)	27 February 1967	Jeseník	8	Mentally ill Josef Svoboda killed his whole family with an ax and then committed suicide.
Fight for the Czechoslovak Radio station	21 August 1968	Prague-Vinohrady	9 (16)	During the attempt of unarmed demonstrators to defend the Czech radio station building against Soviet invaders, 4 men were shot dead and 5 men were hit and killed by a Soviet military truck; the same day at the same place 4 men died due to the explosion of a Soviet tank which was set ablaze by demonstrators, and another 3 people died after the fire spread to surrounding buildings; in other parts of Prague, 2 people were shot dead and 2 people were crushed by Soviet tanks; part of the Soviet invasion of Czechoslovakia.
Occupation of Liberec	21 August 1968	Liberec	9	In the early hours of the Soviet invasion, 4 people were shot dead by Soviet troops in the main square and 24 were injured, 2 of whom died later; a few hours after this, a Soviet tank rammed the arcade at the square causing the immediate death of 2 people and injured 9 (1 died later); part of the Soviet invasion of Czechoslovakia.
JAT Flight 367 bombing	26 January 1972	Srbská Kamenice	27	JAT Flight 367 is brought down by an explosion, killing 27 out of 28 onboard except one Yugoslav flight attendant named Vesna Vulović who survives a 10,160 meter (33,330 ft) drop. Officially a bomb was placed on the plane by Ustasa agents, but speculation exists that the plane was downed by two Czechoslovak SA-12 surface-to-air missiles because it had entered a restricted military area without permission. The McDonnell Douglas DC-9 airplane is destroyed.
Truck attack at the tram stop	10 July 1973	Prague	8	The truck-murderer Olga Hepnarová killed 3 people immediately and injured 17, of whom 5 died later.
Motorest Kadrnožka shooting(cz)	1 June 1981	Motorest Kadrnožka, Tachov District	5	A soldier Lubomír Bugár with a service rifle shot and killed 4 motorist employees. He killed himself after a police pursuit.
Ústav sociální péče v Měděnci fire](cz)	1 November 1984	Mědenice	26	Eva Kováčová, a patient, set fire to an institution for mentally and physically disabled women. Kováčová served 9 years in prison and remained mostly institutionalized for the rest of his life. He underwent sex reassignment surgery in the 90s, taking the name René Lízna. He committed suicide in July 2014. The tragedy was depicted in the 1992 film Requiem pro panenku.
Christmas murders	22 December 1986	Předměřice nad Labem	5	A drunk father named Vladimír Lulek stabbed to death 4 children, and his wife and wounded a neighbor. Executed in 1989.
Kolín massacre(cz)	29 April 1989	Kolín	4	17-year-old Jiří Popelka shot and killed 4 people with stolen guns (from school and his father). Part of a misguided attempt at escape into western Germany. Served 9 years in prison.

== Massacres after 1989 ==
Name	Date	Location	Deaths	Notes
Petřvald shooting	8 March 2009	Petřvald	4 (+ perpetrator's suicide)	Macedonian national Raif Kačar (41) murdered his former girlfriend (25), her parents, and her current partner with an illegally held handgun and then committed suicide. The perpetrator had previously threatened to kill the victims.
Široký důl familicide	2 September 2011	Široký Důl	4	Romana Zienertová(cz) killed her four children with knives and a pillow.
Frenštát pod Radhoštěm apartment building explosion	17 February 2013	Frenštát pod Radhoštěm	6 (+ perpetrator's death)	Antonín Blažek (57), who was facing imminent eviction, spilled gasoline and opened a natural gas valve in the hallway of an apartment building. He set it ablaze, leading to a large explosion, the collapse of part of the building, and fire. The heavily damaged block of flats had to be demolished in its entirety. The perpetrator had previously threatened his neighbors.
Harok family murder	22 May 2013	Brno	4	U.S. national Kevin Dahlgren (20) stabbed to death 4 members of his distant family.
Uherský Brod shooting	24 February 2015	Uherský Brod	8 (+ perpetrator's suicide)	Zdeněk Kovář (63) entered a restaurant and opened fire on guests and staff with a legally held handgun and a revolver. The attack occurred after police ordered him to surrender firearms due to deteriorating mental health. He had committed multiple misdemeanors over the preceding years, which would have allowed police to seize his firearms, however, those were not investigated to the fullest extent of the law.
Ostrava hospital shooting	10 December 2019	Ostrava	7 (+ perpetrator's suicide)	Ctirad Vitásek (42) shot patients in a waiting room in the University Hospital Ostrava with use of illegal CZ-75 handgun. The perpetrator had three prior criminal convictions, one of them for a violent crime. The perpetrator had been placed in a mental asylum before.
Vejprty care center arson	19 January 2020	Vejprty	8	An unknown person set ablaze a care center for the mentally handicapped in Vejprty, killing eight. There were two previous minor incidents with fire being set inside the building that had been investigated by police. A care center operator reacted by confiscating all lighters from clients, but authorities deemed that illegal so they had to be returned.
Bohumín arson attack	8 August 2020	Bohumín	11	Zdeněk Konopka (54) set on fire his son's flat which was bustling with people attending a birthday party to which he was not invited, killing 11 people. The perpetrator had four prior criminal convictions, two of them for violent crimes. The perpetrator had threatened his son and estranged wife several weeks before the attack, the police investigation into that incident was still open at the time of the attack.
Loučka attack	24 April 2022	Loučka, Vsetín District	4	Father killed his wife and 3 children with a knife. Caused house explosion.
2023 Prague shootings	21 December 2023	Prague	14 (+ perpetrator's death + perpetrator's father earlier)	An armed assailant opened fire on the grounds of Charles University in Prague hours after murdering his own father. The perpetrator had killed 14 people at the university, before the perpetrator committed suicide; earlier in the day, the perpetrator had killed his father.

== See also ==
- List of massacres in Slovakia
