= Capital punishment in the Czech Republic =

Europe holds the greatest concentration of abolitionist states (blue). Map current as of 2022 Abolished for all offences Abolished in practice Retains capital punishment

Capital punishment (trest smrti in Czech) is forbidden by the Charter of Fundamental Rights and Freedoms of the Czech Republic (part of the constitutional law of the Czech Republic) and is simultaneously prohibited by international legal obligations arising from the Czech Republic's membership in both the Council of Europe and the European Union.

Historically, capital punishment was legal, and was used, when the Czech Republic was part of Czechoslovakia, until the punishment was abolished by amendment of the federal criminal code in 1990. The last execution was carried out in 1989.

== History and methods of capital punishment ==
Capital punishment was common under the Austrian Monarchy (with a short exception from 1787 to 1795 under the rule of Joseph II), in Austria-Hungary, and from 1918 in the newly created Czechoslovakia. From 1918 to 1989, a total of 1,217 people were executed legally, the majority of them (61%) immediately after World War II; many others (21%) were executed for political reasons during the early years of communist rule and the rest of the executed people were convicted criminals (18%).

The common method of execution during the entire period was pole hanging. Other methods of hanging or firing squad were rare. Following the abolition of open-air execution areas in 1954, an execution cell was built in the basement of Pankrác Prison, where executions were carried out until 1989. The device in Pankrác's "death chamber" was a simple noose attached to the wall with a remotely-operated trapdoor in the floor.

=== First Czechoslovak Republic (1918–1938) ===
During the presidency of Tomáš Garrigue Masaryk (1918–35) 16 people were executed, including 4 for military treason. Masaryk was an opponent of capital punishment and had the privilege of commuting death sentences, one he exercised frequently. His successor Edvard Beneš signed the death sentences for 8 people, including 3 for military treason. After his resignation 2 more criminals were executed before the occupation of the country.

=== German occupation (1939–1945) ===
During the time of the German occupation thousands were executed and hundreds of thousands were killed without any trial. Although summary executions happened rarely (in comparison to other countries occupied by the Germans), such occasions happened nearly every year (see massacres during World War II). In Prague Pankrác Prison 1,079 were guillotined or hanged, about 550 were shot in Kobylisy Shooting Range, about 800 were shot or hanged in Brno, about 300 were shot or hanged in Theresienstadt, etc. Hundreds of Czech people were also tried and executed in German prisons, such as Dresden (846 people) or Berlin Plötzensee Prison (677 people). Thousands of others were killed by hanging, gas chambers or shooting in the Nazi concentration camps.

In the period of German occupation, only 3 criminals were sentenced to death and executed by Czech courts.

=== Postwar retribution (1945–1948) ===
After World War II, based on the Beneš decrees, special courts at the local level (lidové soudy, people's courts) were set up to punish war crimes and collaboration. Until 1948 they sentenced 713 people to death. Another 10 people were executed for common crimes.

=== Communist Czechoslovakia (1948–1989) ===
During the presidency of Klement Gottwald (1948–1953), 237 people were executed, of whom over 190 for political crimes. Gottwald pardoned 18 people. Among the best known of those executed are Milada Horáková, a politician, hanged in 1950. The widely publicised Prague Trials with the former party's general secretary Rudolf Slánský resulted in 11 executions.

During this period hundreds of other people died due to cruel conditions in prisons and concentration camps such as the uranium mine in Jáchymov.

During the presidency of Antonín Zápotocký (1953–1957), 94 people were executed. That figure fell to 87 people during Antonín Novotný's presidency (1957–1968), 14 people during the presidency of Ludvík Svoboda (1968–1975, including a period during which Prime Minister Lubomír Štrougal acted as President during Svoboda's illness), and then to 38 people during that of Gustáv Husák (1975–1989).

From 1954 to 1968 all executions were carried out in Pankrác Prison, Prague; after 1968 some took place in Bratislava. In 1956 the number of crimes punishable by death was reduced and mandatory review of sentences was introduced. In 1961 a law made the conditions for capital punishment more strict, with only especially brutal murders punishable by death.

The last execution in Czechoslovakia took place on 8 June 1989, when Štefan Svitek was hanged in Bratislava prison for triple murder; in today's Czech Republic the last executed person was Vladimír Lulek, hanged on 2 February 1989 in Pankrác Prison for murder of his wife and four children. The last person sentenced to death was Zdeněk Vocásek, but his sentence was changed to life imprisonment in 1990.

=== Abolition of capital punishment ===
Soon after the Communist party fell from power in 1989 the new president Václav Havel pushed the abolition of capital punishment through parliament. A May 1990 criminal law reform replaced capital punishment with life imprisonment. Furthermore, in January 1991 capital punishment became prohibited by the Charter of Fundamental Rights and Freedoms, which became part of the Czechoslovak constitutional law and since the dissolution of Czechoslovakia remains part of the Czech constitutional law. The practice became further prohibited when the Czech Republic joined the Council of Europe in 1993 and the European Union in 2004.

== Public opinion ==
A 2008 poll found that over 60 percent of those questioned said they thought the death penalty should be reintroduced. In 2007 it was 58%.

However, a 2019 poll showed that support for the death penalty was declining, with 50 percent of Czechs saying they would like the death penalty to be reintroduced, while 41 percent were against the reintroduction. A 2023 poll has shown that 51% of Czechs were against the death penalty, 42% supported it and 7% were unsure or undecided.

A 2025 poll found that 52% of respondents supported the death penalty, 45% opposed it and 3% were undecided, reversing the recent trend of increased opposition to the death penalty.
