= Dotzauer =

Dotzauer like the spelling variant Totzauer is a Sudeten German toponymic surname for an inhabitant of Totzau (Czech: Tocov), a small village in northern Bohemia that was abandoned and destroyed in 1946. Notable people with the surname include:

- Friedrich Dotzauer (1783–1860), German cellist and composer
- Richard Dotzauer (1816–1887), Czech politician and entrepreneur
- Uwe Dotzauer (born 1959), East German Nordic combined skier
