= Totzauer =

Totzauer like the spelling variant Dotzauer is a Sudeten German toponymic surname for an inhabitant of Totzau (Czech: Tocov), a small village in western Bohemia, region Carlsbad that was abandoned and destroyed in 1946. Notable people with the surname include:

- Caren Totzauer, German wheelchair curler
- Sophie Totzauer (born 1992), Austrian model
