= Svitek =

Svitek is a surname. Notable people with the surname include:

- Louis Svitek, American musician and guitarist
- Štefan Svitek (1960–1989), Czechoslovak murderer
- Štefan Svitek (basketball) (born 1966), Slovak basketball player and coach
- Vladimír Svitek (born 1962), Slovak ice hockey player
- Will Svitek (born 1982), American football player
