= Capital punishment in Slovakia =

Europe holds the greatest concentration of abolitionist states (blue). Map current as of 2022 Abolished for all offences Abolished in practice Retains capital punishment

Capital punishment in Slovakia (Slovak: Trest smrti) was abolished in 1990 and the most severe punishment permissible by law is life imprisonment. Before that, capital punishment was common in Czechoslovakia, the Slovak State, Austria-Hungary, the Kingdom of Hungary and probably all previous political entities that existed in the area of today's Slovakia. Since 1989, no one has been executed in Slovakia save for a few controversial political killings by the Slovak Secret Service in the 1990s. Since then, there have been no reports of the government or its agents committing arbitrary or unlawful killings.

The last person executed in Slovakia remains Štefan Svitek (28) from Podbrezová who killed his wife and two daughters with an axe in 1987 and was executed on 8 June 1989 in Bratislava, Czechoslovakia (at that time).

== Public opinion ==
A 2001 poll found that support for the Death penalty was 57%.

A 2005 poll carried out by the MVK agency for the SME daily found 61.7 percent of the respondents in favour of reintroducing capital punishment in Slovakia.

== See also ==
- Life imprisonment in Slovakia
