= František Zvardoň =

Czech writer and photographer (1949–2024)

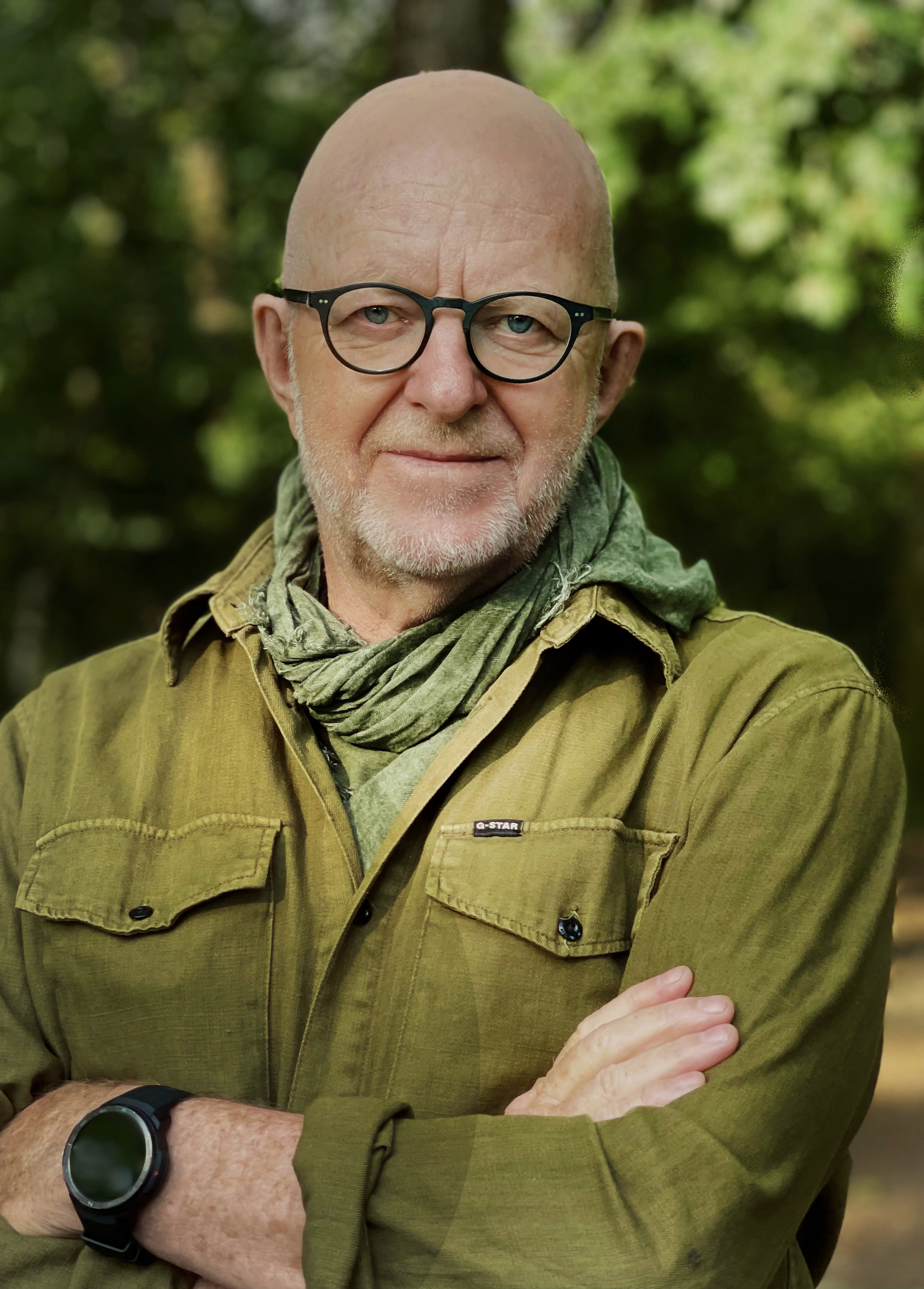
- Zvardoň in 2022
- Born: 20 June 1949; Petřvald, Czechoslovakia
- Died: 13 November 2024 (aged 75); Ittenheim, France
- Occupations: Writer, photographer

František Zvardoň (20 June 1949 – 13 November 2024) was a Czech writer, photographer and reporter.

== Life and career ==
Born in Petřvald on 20 June 1949, Zvardoň attended photography school in Brno. He began working in Opava and then Ostrava. In 1976, he was awarded a UNESCO prize for photographer in Vancouver. In 1987, he fled Czechoslovakia and landed in France, seeking political asylum. He joined the La Maison des Artistes in Paris and began reporting in 1989, working in Berlin, Istanbul, and Strasbourg. He was then published numerous magazines and other publications.

In addition to his other activities, Zvardoň also illustrated more than 300 books.

Zvardoň died in Ittenheim on 13 November 2024, at the age of 75.

== Awards ==
- UNESCO prize (1976)
- Nikon Photo Contest international Prize (1983)
- Olympus Prize (1990)
- United Nations Environment Programme prize (1996)
- Grand Prix of the Académie d'Alsace (2019)

== Publications ==
- On my own (1990)
- Vache (1992)
- Les routes du lait (1994)
- Paysages humains (1996)
- Bible 2000 (1996)
- Alsace Dialogue du paysage (2000)
- Empreinte du temps (2004)
- L'Alsace de Zvardon (2005)
- Surma (Éthiopie) (2006)
- Petra Werlé – Histoires naturelles (2007)
- Bleu de Terre (2008)
- Le Bas-Rhin (2008)
- Strasbourg (2009)
- Les Alsaciens (2009)
- La route des vins d'Alsace (2010)
- Chemins de Saint-Jacques-de-Compostelle (2010)
- Petra Werlé – De la nature des choses (2010)
- Au fil du Rhin (2010)
- Metz (2010)
- Éthiopie Instants éternels (2011)
- Au-dessus des châteaux de France (2012)
- Au-dessus des parcs et jardins de France (2013)
- Alsace Panorama (2013)
- L'excellence en Alsace (2014)
- Aurora Borealis (2015)
- Secrets de cathédrale (2015)
- Un port au cœur de la ville (2016)
- Silences d'Alsace (2017)
- Lalique, l'art de la main (2018)
- Wissembourg et ses secrets (2018)
- Notre-Dame-de-Paris - Au carrefour des Cultures (2018)
- Hagueneau et ses secrets (2018)
- Sanctuaire Notre-Dame du Laus (2019)
- Notre-Dame de Paris l'éternelle (2019)
- Saverne et ses secrets (2019)
- Notre-Dame de la Garde, Marseille (2019)
- Basilique Sainte-Marie-Madeleine (2019)
- Le champ de feu (2019)
- Hunspach l'authentique (2020)
- Secrets de la Légion étrangère (2022)
