= Ústí massacre =

Outbreak of violence against ethnic Germans in the Sudetenland soon after World War 2

Coordinates: 50°39′30″N 14°2′30″E

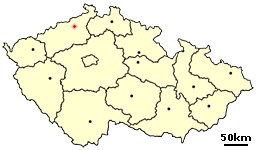
Location of Ústí nad Labem in the Czech Republic

The Ústí massacre (Czech: Ústecký masakr, German: Massaker von Aussig) was a lynching of ethnic Germans, triggered by the explosion of an ammunition depot, in Ústí nad Labem (Aussig an der Elbe), a largely ethnic German city in northern parts of the Bohemian Sudetenland, that occurred shortly after the end of World War II, on 31 July 1945.

Neither the reason for the explosion nor subsequent pogrom has ever been conclusively identified; the official government investigation following the massacre placed blame on the Werwolf forces (Nazi saboteurs), however the outcome of the investigation has been called into question by contemporary historians, as additional equally reasonable possibilities exist.

== Munitions explosion and subsequent pogrom ==
On July 31, at 15:30, an ammunition depot in Ústí nad Labem, Krásné Březno, exploded. 27 people, 7 of which were Czech, died in the explosion and dozens of others were injured.

Immediately after the explosion, a massacre of ethnic Germans, who had to wear white armbands after the war and so were easy to identify, began in three places in the city, the local train station, the Dr. Edvard Beneš bridge and a local pond used as a supply of water for fire hydrants. They were beaten, bayoneted, shot, or drowned. On the Beneš bridge, the German Georg Schörghuber shouted something provocative and was thrown by a present crowd into the Elbe river below, he was then shot at by soldiers when he tried to swim out of the river. Soon after other people began joining in the attacking of other Germans in the city.

Some Czech residents of Ústí tried to help the victims in numerous ways: some by trying to alert unaware ethnic Germans to what was happening, others by physically fighting the attackers or by hiding and sheltering those who were attacked. An examples of this was a Dutch ship anchored below the Beneš bridge who sheltered a woman with a baby and pram, who were thrown into the Elbe river and shot at, another was Josef Vondra, the towns mayor, who tried to prevent the attacks.

The perpetrators were the Revolutionary Guards (a post-war paramilitary group), Czechoslovak and Soviet soldiers, and a group of Czechs who had arrived on a train the same day as the massacre occurred from Prague. Eventually, a state of emergency and a curfew were declared, and by 18:25, the city streets had been cleared by the army.

== Count of victims ==
Estimates for the number of victims vary highly. Following the massacre, 43 bodies were conclusively identified as being related to it. The identified bodies consist of 24 gathered in the city, which were burned in the crematorium of the former concentration camp in Terezín on 1 August; a list was made of the 17 missing clerks from the Schicht factory, who were returning from work by way of the bridge at the time of the explosion; and two are mentioned in other sources. In Germany, about 80 more bodies were recovered from the Elbe river in the following weeks; however, due to the massacre taking place near the time of the Brno death march, it's impossible to say how many bodies came from Ústí nad Labem.

Vladimír Keiser, the former director of Ústí nad Labem archives, estimates that at most 80 people were killed in the events following the explosion. The post war Sudeten Germans organizations give higher estimates of up to 2000 victims.

== Cause and investigations ==
Concrete reasons and if there were organizers behind the massacre and explosion remain disputed and largely speculative. Historian Jaroslav Rokoský at the Jan Evangelista Purkyně University stated in an interview with Czech Radio that "[what or whom caused the munitions explosion] isn't clear". Vladimír Keiser, the former director of Ústí nad Labem archives, stated in the same interview "there are about 8 hypotheses, all of which are credible". Other historians, such as František Hanzlík, who was present in the city at the time as a child, disagree and find an accident to be the most likely explanation, stating "There were more similar explosions like this after the war. [It's just that those explosions] didn't happen ... in a city", Hanzlík attributes the explosion to a misfiring of a Panzerfaust.

=== Official investigation by Czechoslovak government ===
The day following the massacre, 1 August, the government of Czechoslovakia established an investigation commission led by General Ludvík Svoboda and Václav Nosek. The commission was not able to discover the reason for the explosion but attributed it to Werwolves (Nazi saboteurs). Related to the investigation was a similar incident five days prior when a train wagon with dynamite was set on fire, which likely added to the conclusion that the explosion was intentional.

=== Post-1989 investigations ===
After the 1989 Velvet Revolution, city archivist Vladimír Kaiser started to investigate the event, most recently publishing the results together with Jan Havel, another Ústí citizen, and German historian Otfrid Pustejovsky as Stalo se v Ústí nad Labem 31. července 1945. They concluded that while only indirect evidence survived, it was conclusive enough to show that the explosion and massacre were prepared by Communists within the Czechoslovak secret services, specifically Bedřich Pokorný, a communist secret service officer and leader of Ministry of Interior's Defensive Intelligence (Obranné zpravodajství) department who organized the Brno death march. The speculated motive for this was orchestrating an incident which would support the transfer of Germans from Czechoslovakia by presenting to the Potsdam Conference an argument that further cohabitation of Germans with Czechs was impossible.

In a 2000 issue of Lidové Noviny, Vladimír Kaiser also shared a hypothesis that the motive was the Western powers' interest in destroying the new Daimler-Benz DB 605 airplane engines, also stored in the ammunition dump. This was found to be far-fetched and untenable by Jiří Loewy, a chief-redactor at the Právo lidu Newspaper.

== Consequences ==
The explosion and subsequent massacre were used as a pretext by advocates of the expulsion of Germans from Czechoslovakia. During the Communist regime in Czechoslovakia (1948–1989) details of the event were suppressed, to the point of it being almost unknown to most Czechs.

== Memorial ==
On the 60 year anniversary of the event, 31 July 2005, the mayor of Ústí unveiled a memorial plaque on the Dr. Edvard Beneš bridge with the text "In the memory of victims of violence on 31 July 1945", in two languages, Czech and German.

== See also ==
- Brno death march
- List of massacres in the Czech Republic
- Sudetenland
- Potsdam conference
