= Occupation of Liberec =

- Part of Warsaw Pact invasion of Czechoslovakia
Date	21 August 1968
Location	Liberec, Czechoslovakia
Result	Soviet victory: Occupation of Liberec by Soviet army

Belligerents
Czechoslovakia	Soviet Union

Strength
Hundreds of unarmed people	Unknown

Casualties and losses
9 killed 45 injured	Unknown

Occupation of Liberec occurred on 21 August 1968 during the Warsaw Pact invasion of Czechoslovakia. In the early hours of the Soviet invasion, 4 people were shot dead by Soviet troops in the main square and 24 were injured, 2 of whom died later; a few hours after this, a Soviet tank rammed the arcade at the square causing the immediate death of 2 people and injured 9 (1 died later); Occupation of Liberec was second bloodiest event of the invasion after Battle for Czechoslovak Radio.

== Background ==
On January 5, 1968, Alexander Dubček became the first secretary of the Central Committee of the CPSU. It marked the beginning of the so-called Prague Spring. This process began to worry other Eastern Bloc countries, including the USSR. The leadership of the Soviet Union initially attempted to stop or limit the changes in the Czechoslovakia through a series of warnings. After a series of unsuccessful negotiations on the night of August 20 to August 21, 1968, the troops of the five Warsaw Pact states launched an invasion of Czechoslovakia.

== Events ==
Soviet troops reached Liberec at 2 am. At 3 am, the first incident happened when a group of Soldiers started shooting at youths who believed it was a military training. Miroslav Vlček was shot in the head but survived.

When the sun came out, crowds of people went to the streets. They expressed their opposition to the Soviet occupation by making gestures, threatening with their fists, crying and shouting at the soldiers. Some started throwing stones and pieces of construction material at them. At 6 am a Soviet tanks ran over Jan Šoltys on Beneš' square after Šoltys threw a piece of wood at the tank. Šoltys was badly injured but luckily survived. At 7 am a brick was thrown at Soviet soldiers passing through Beneš's square in a GAZ vehicle which injured the driver. Soviet soldiers started shooting at people on the square, which resulted in the immediate deaths of 4 people and the injury of many. 2 other people died of their injuries a few days later. Around 11 am a Soviet tanker crashed near town's square and killed three more.
