= Bedřich Pokorný =

Czech soldier and policeman (1904–1968)

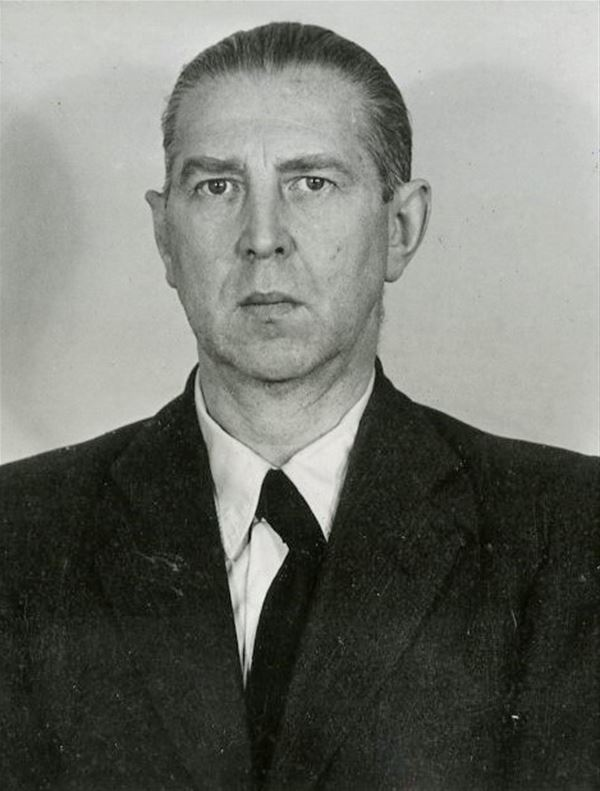
- Born: 6 March 1904; Brno, Moravia, Austria-Hungary
- Died: 25 March 1968 (aged 64) near Brni, Czechoslovakia

Bedřich Pokorný (6 March 1904 – 25 March 1968) was a Czech soldier and policeman. He was a secret service officer in the communist Czechoslovakia and an agent of the State Security.

== Life and career ==
Pokorný was born on 6 March 1904 in Brno. joined the Czechoslovak Army in 1924 and began attending the Military Academy at Hranice in 1926. After finishing courses in military intelligence in 1934, he was appointed an intelligence officer of the 12th Division in Košice and later in Prešov and worked in espionage aiming against the Kingdom of Hungary.

After the occupation of Czechoslovakia and creation of the Slovak state, he returned home. Like many other officers of the former Czechoslovak Army he got a job in the protectorate administration and became a financial clerk of the Moravian land office in Brno. During the occupation he reportedly cooperated with several resistance groups, including that run by the Communist Party of Czechoslovakia. His active resistance was later, during the show trials in the 1950s, alleged to have been fictional and he was accused instead of collaboration with the Nazis.

In April 1945, after the liberation of Brno by the Red Army, Pokorný took over command of the newly organized Czech police. In May, he became a police commander in Moravia. During the summer of 1945, Pokorný and many other senior Czechoslovak officials organized both ethnic cleansing and expulsion against the Sudeten Germans. This included the Brno death march. In July 1945 Pokorný joined the Communist Party and was appointed commander of one of the intelligence service sections of the Ministry of Interior in Prague. During the retribution, Pokorný led the investigation against many of the German war criminals, but he has since been accused of faking some testimonies and forging evidence to harm the communist party's opponents.

In January 1951 Pokorný was arrested and in December 1953 sentenced in a show trial to 16 years imprisonment for sabotage, conspiracy, protection of former Gestapo agents and collaborators, and other activities, which supposedly hindered the work of the police. The sentence was quashed in November 1956 and Pokorný was released, rehabilitated and had his party membership restored.

On 25 March 1968, during the Prague Spring, Pokorný hanged himself in a forest near Brno.
