= Vojtěch Mynář =

Czech politician (1944–2018)

Vojtěch Mynář MEP
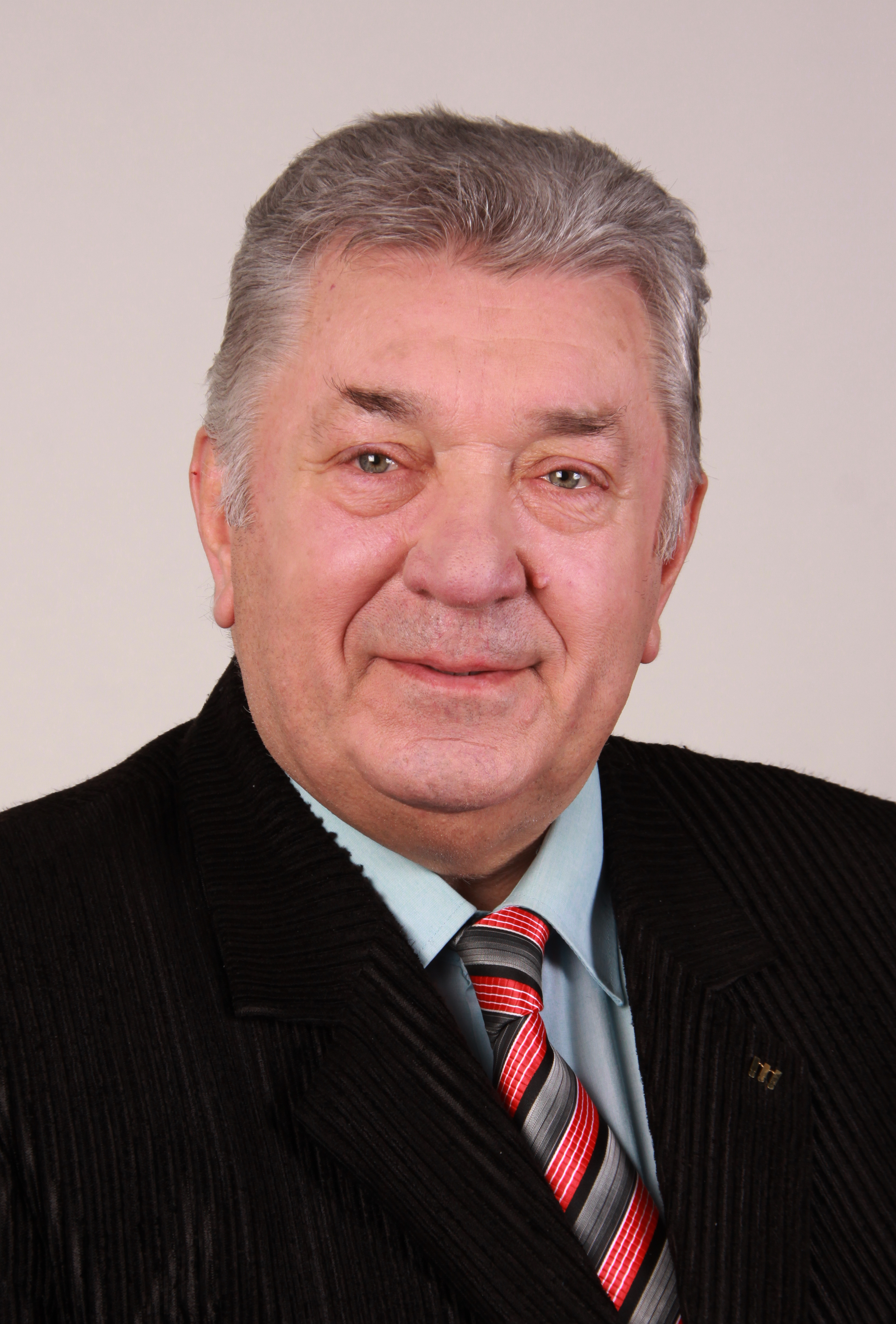

Member of the European Parliament
- In office 23 July 2012 – 30 June 2014
- Constituency: Czech Republic

Personal details
- Born: 4 May 1944 Petřvald, Czechoslovakia
- Died: 11 July 2018 (aged 74)
- Party: Social Democratic Party
- Occupation: Politician

Vojtěch Mynář (4 May 1944 – 11 July 2018) was a Czech politician, who from 2012 until 2014, was a Member of the European Parliament, representing the Czech Republic. He was a member of the Social Democratic Party.
