= Psáry =

- Municipality
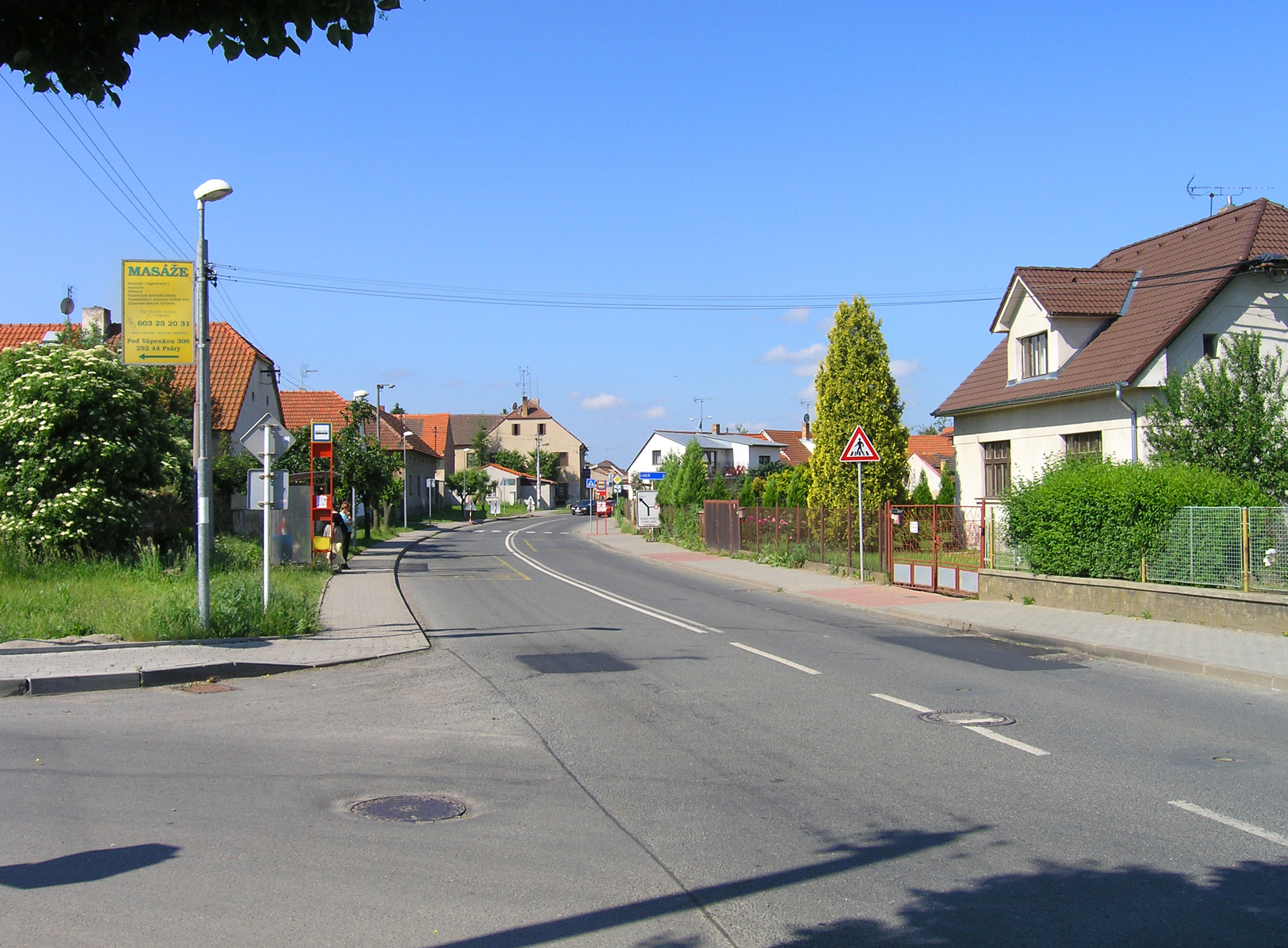
- Psárská street

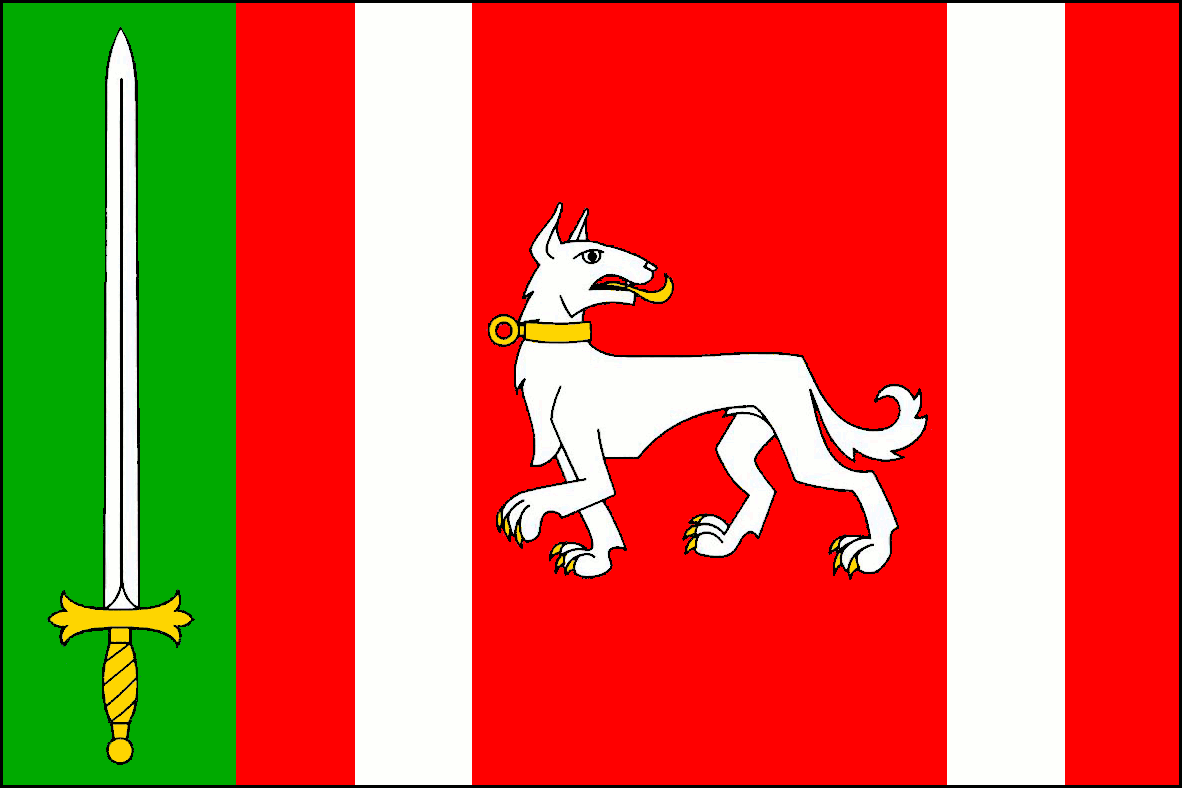
- Flag Coat of arms

- Location in the Czech Republic
- Coordinates: 49°56′11″N 14°30′46″E
- Country: Czech Republic
- Region: Central Bohemian
- District: Prague-West
- First mentioned: 1088

Area
  - Total: 11.25 km^{2} (4.34 sq mi)
- Elevation: 346 m (1,135 ft)

Population (2026-01-01)
  - Total: 4,322
  - Density: 384.2/km^{2} (995.0/sq mi)
- Time zone: UTC+1 (CET)
  - Summer (DST): UTC+2 (CEST)
- Postal code: 252 44
- Website: psary.cz

Psáry (Czech pronunciation: [ˈpsaːrɪ]) is a municipality and village in Prague-West District in the Central Bohemian Region of the Czech Republic. It has about 4,300 inhabitants.

== Administrative division ==
Psáry consists of two municipal parts (in brackets population according to the 2021 census):

- Psáry (1,493)
- Dolní Jirčany (2,796)

== Etymology ==
The name has its root in the Czech word psi (i.e. 'dogs'). It was a village where psáři lived, or people who took care of hunting dogs.

== Geography ==
Psáry is located about 10 kilometres (6 mi) south of Prague. It lies on the border between the Prague Plateau and Benešov Uplands. The highest point is at 450 m (1,476 ft) above sea level. The stream Zahořanský potok originates here and flows across the municipal territory to the west.

== History ==
The first written mention of Psáry is from 1088, when King Vratislaus II donated part of the village to the Vyšehrad Chapter. The village was historically divided into two parts with different owners.

== Demographics ==
Historical population

Year	Pop.	±%
1869	812	—
1880	921	+13.4%
1890	1,036	+12.5%
1900	1,069	+3.2%
1910	1,089	+1.9%

Year	Pop.	±%
1921	1,075	−1.3%
1930	1,125	+4.7%
1950	979	−13.0%
1961	992	+1.3%
1970	1,001	+0.9%

Year	Pop.	±%
1980	1,341	+34.0%
1991	1,309	−2.4%
2001	1,814	+38.6%
2011	3,595	+98.2%
2021	4,289	+19.3%

Source: Censuses

== Transport ==
There are no railways or major roads passing through the municipality. The D0 motorway runs north of Psáry just outside the municipal territory.

== Sights ==
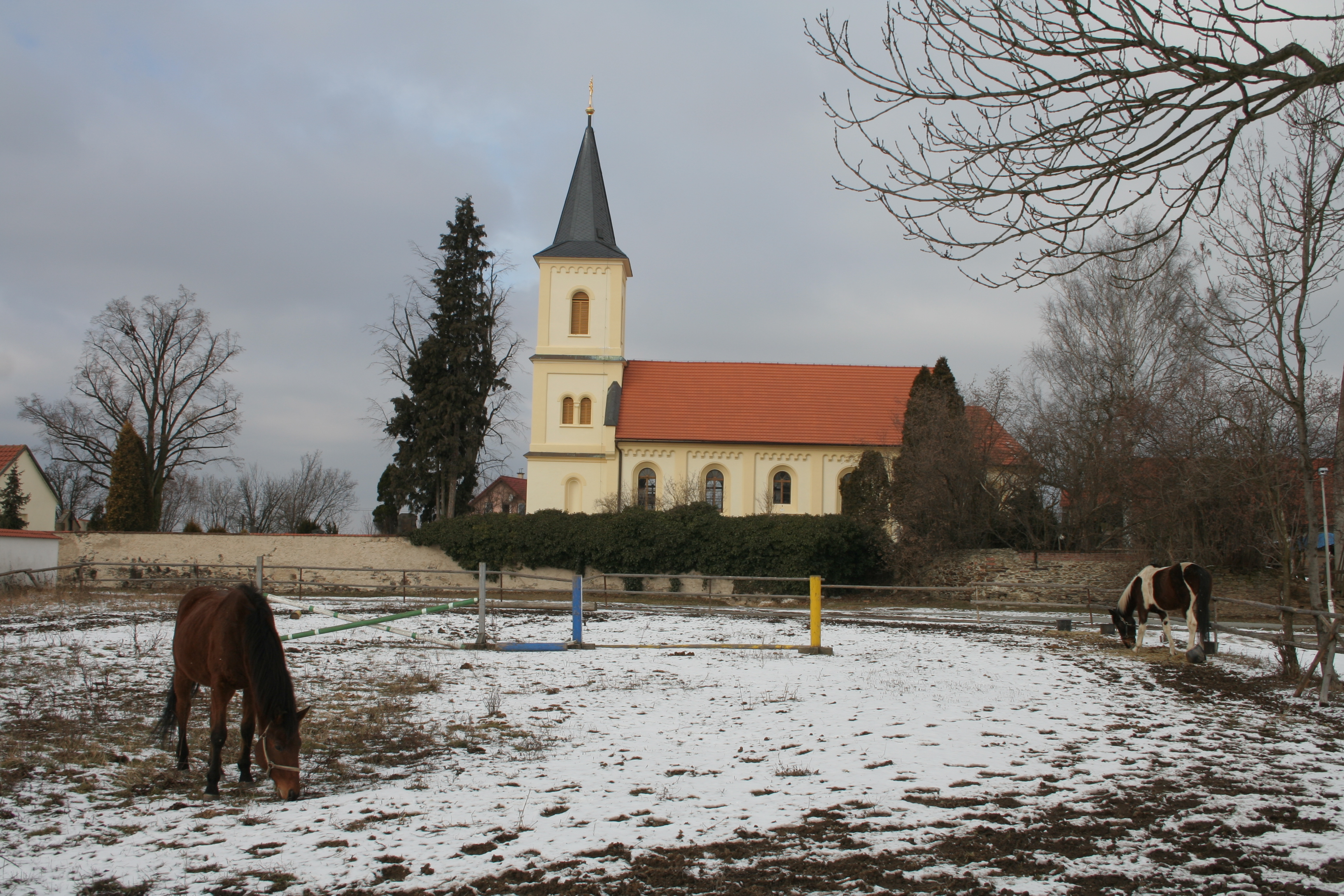
Church of Saint Wenceslaus

The main landmark of Psáry is the Church of Saint Wenceslaus. It has an early Gothic core from the 13th century. The Neo-Romanesque nave and tower were added in 1877.
