= Brno death march =

1945 expulsion of Germans from Czechoslovakia

The Brno death march (German: Brünner Todesmarsch) began late on the night of 30 May 1945 when the ethnic German minority in Brno (German: Brünn [bʁʏn]) was forcibly deported to nearby Austria following the capture of the city by the Allies during World War II. Only about half of the expellees actually crossed the border. Thousands of people were held in the provisional camps in the border area. While some Germans were later allowed to return to Brno, hundreds of others fell victim to diseases, rape, torture, and malnutrition in the following weeks. The number of fatalities caused by the march and imprisonment is disputed, as it became part of propaganda. It is estimated that between 1,700 and 2,000 people died as a consequence of the march. More recent studies during the 1990s have indicated that over 5,000 people died.

== Background ==
=== Liberation of Brno ===
After six years of German occupation, the city of Brno, capital of the Czechoslovak province of Moravia, was liberated on 26 April 1945 by the Soviet and Romanian armies of the 2nd Ukrainian Front, in the context of the Bratislava–Brno Offensive. The next day, the Nazi German administration of the city was abolished and replaced by the newly–created and Czech-led Národní výbor města Brna ("People's Committee of the City of Brno"). While at the beginning of 1945, there were about 58,000 Germans registered in the city, most of them were evacuated before the fighting reached the city, or fled on their own in fear of the Red Army. After the liberation, the Národní výbor registered about 26,000 people considered as Germans. Shortly afterward, the Germans were marked with white armbands and became subject to similar restrictions to those previously directed against the Jews by the Nazis.

=== Prelude to forced expulsion ===
Soon after the war ended, the Czechoslovak government incited the expulsion of its large ethnic German minority from the country. Over half a million people were forced to march to the German and Austrian borders, and tens to hundreds of thousands were killed. During May 1945, the Národní výbor several times discussed the need to punish Nazi war criminals, their Czech collaborators, and the general situation of Germans in the city. About 1,500 people were arrested, most of them Germans. On 23 May, the Národní výbor of Brno urged the Czechoslovak government to immediately establish courts for such criminals, because the people in Brno were rioting in front of the prison in an attempt to lynch the prisoners. Moreover, there was a severe housing shortage in Brno as a consequence of the combat and previous bombings. In particular, factory workers demanded government confiscation of the apartments of the ethnic Germans.

On 30 May 1945, the Zemský národní výbor ("Provincial National Committee"), which resided in Brno, issued its order No. 78/1945, which ordered the immediate expulsion of the non-working German population from Brno. All women, boys under the age of 14, and men over the age of 60 should leave the city immediately, and the working men after they have been replaced in their work. On the morning of 30 May, the representatives of a large firearms factory in Brno urged the police director to carry out this order immediately. They also offered armed men from the factory to assist. To select the particular Germans to be expelled, police used a rationing system which was originally introduced by the Germans at the Invasion of Poland and which also allocated food to the recipients by race and ethnicity.

== The march ==
At around 6 pm on 29 May 1945, police and assistance troops started to gather all recipients of food coupons marked with a "D" (for Germans); and at around 10 pm on 30 May the first groups of Germans were forced to start to march 55 kilometres (34 mi) south towards the Austrian border. According to police reports, 18,072 Germans were forcibly deported.

In the middle of the night, the group reached the town of Rajhrad about 15 kilometres (9 mi) from Brno, where most of those expelled spent the rest of the night in the orphanage.

The next day, 1 June, many people were too exhausted to walk, so the guards selected about 10,000 people still able to walk and escorted them to the Austrian border near Mikulov. At the time, the representatives of Austria in Brno, as well as Soviet occupation authorities in Austria, had already protested against this unarranged transfer of large numbers of people and persuaded the Czechoslovak government to stop the expulsion. About half of the expellees thus remained in the camp of Pohořelice.

== Pohořelice camp ==
=== History of the camp in Pohořelice ===
The town of Pohořelice had a large German minority, and after the Munich Agreement it became part of the Third Reich. After the outbreak of war, a small camp for prisoners of war was established near the town. In 1944, it became a concentration camp for Hungarian Jews, who were used for the hardest work. The Jews were liberated by the Red Army in the middle of April 1945, and the then empty camp was used to accommodate the Germans of Brno, whose number far exceeded the camp's capacity.

=== Living conditions ===
Since the Austrian authorities refused to accept any people before their Austrian origin was proven and since the Czech authorities in Brno considered the return of Germans to Brno as politically unacceptable, the Czechoslovak Ministry of Interior decided that the group of approximately 10,000 Germans had to stay in Pohořelice and the surrounding villages, where significant German minorities were already accommodated. As the Pohořelice camp had been abandoned more than a month before, there was no opportunity to provide proper housing, food, and health care for thousands of people. Not until 5 June was proper camp administration established and a regular food supply provided. At this time, an epidemic of dysentery (shigellosis) broke out. According to official records, 455 dead were buried near the town of Pohořelice, mostly victims of diseases. Sudeten German sources, however, estimated that between 1,300–8,000 people either died of disease or were murdered.

Later in June, the camp inmates were better identified, and about 2,000–2,500 were selected and allowed to return to Brno, most of whom had Czech origin or Czech relatives in Brno. Once the news of their return spread into the city, police reported a new wave of anti-German protests. About 1,000 expellees were accommodated by families of surrounding villages, and 1,807 mostly elderly people were relocated to the former Institute for Juvenile in Mušlov next to Mikulov. Hundreds of individuals with German or Austrian citizenship were allowed to go to Austria. Others were sent to other camps in Brno and Svatobořice.

The camp in Pohořelice was officially dissolved on 7 July 1945, when there were still about 80 Germans from Brno in Pohořelice. About 60 of them were sick people in provisory hospital.

== Casualties ==
Because of the quick, improvised course of events, the exact number of casualties is very difficult to state. The estimates vary widely and have become a source of political disputes and propaganda.

Austrian researchers found 1,950 victims of the march itself, 2,000 victims in the Pohořelice camp, and 190 victims in surrounding villages. In total, 4,140 German victims from Brno died in Pohořelice and other camps plus 1,062 who died in Austria.

German sources regard the later communist police officer Bedřich Pokorný as responsible for organizing the Ústí massacre of hundreds of ethnic Germans on 31 July 1945. There have been attempts to confirm statements that Pokorný had thousands of people executed. Emilia Hrabovec was unable to substantiate these charges, but instead, according to her research, old people and tired young children had been sent away on trucks under the supervision of Czechoslovak guards.

According to official death records from 1945, 455 people from Brno died and were buried in Pohořelice (near the town), 129 in Mušlov, and 65 in villages surrounding the town of Pohořelice. In total, 649 victims originally expelled from Brno died on Czech territory.

== Remembrance ==
In 1995, Czech writer Ludvík Vaculík filed a criminal charge for the crime of genocide related to the event of expulsion of Germans from Brno. Czech police, however, did not find evidence for such a crime as there were only 3 confirmed violent deaths (two on the march and one later in Mušlov).

In 2000 a group of young Czech students called for an adequate way to remember the events in Brno. In 2015 the council of Brno officially regretted the harm on the victims of the death march and organized a "Pilgrimage of Reconciliation" along the route.

In 2002, a joint commission of German and Czech historians collected evidence and published the results in a book titled Rozumět dějinám ("Understanding History").

In 2007, a group of young people organized a night Memorial March from Brno to Pohořelice to commemorate the event. On the first occasion, only three people participated in the march, and in the following years, about 20–30 people attended. On the 70th anniversary of the event in 2015, the march was supported by the city of Brno, and the number of participants was about 300, including some representatives of Sudeten German organizations. Until 2013, some eyewitnesses also participated in the memorial march.

There is a memorial stone in St Thomas's Abbey garden to commemorate the tragic events.

Alexandra Saemmer's digital poem Böhmische Dörfer (2012) is a retelling of the march.

== See also ==
- Ústí massacre
- Lidice massacre
