= Prague Monitor =

- Website type: News
- Available in: English
- Area served: Czech Republic, Europe, English-speaking world
- Owner: PTV Media
- Creator: unknown
- Editors: Kateřina Heilmann, Martina Čermáková
- Website: praguemonitor.com
- Advertising: Yes
- Commercial: Yes
- Registration: Optional
- Launched: 2003; 23 years ago
- Current status: Active

The Prague Monitor is an English-language electronic daily publication covering news and events in the Czech Republic.

It began publication in 2003 under the name Prague Daily Monitor. In 2009 the publication started a print run of 3,000 bi-weekly copies of a magazine covering current affairs, business and lifestyle topics related to the Czech Republic.
