= Petřvald (Karviná District) =

- Town
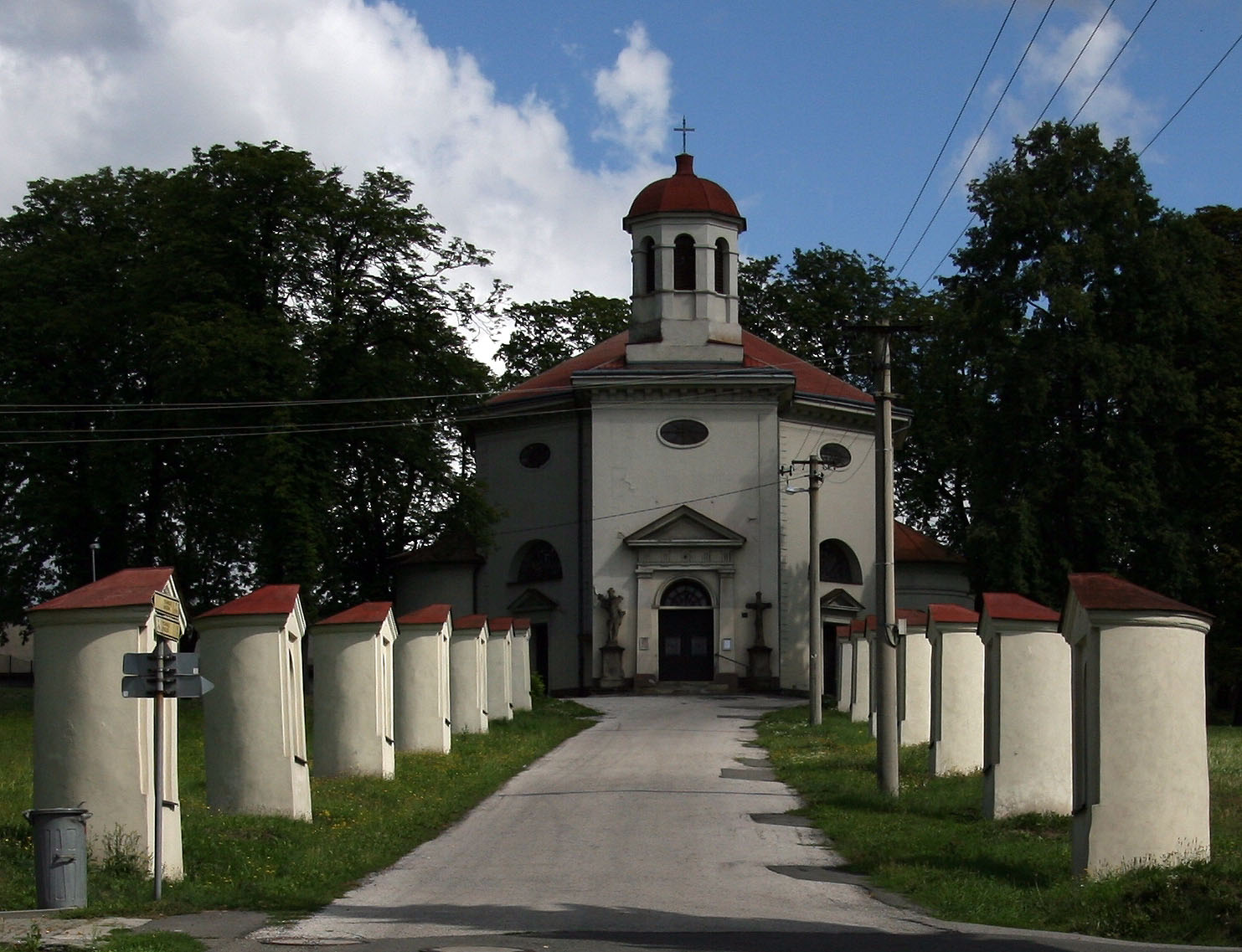
- Church of Saint Henry

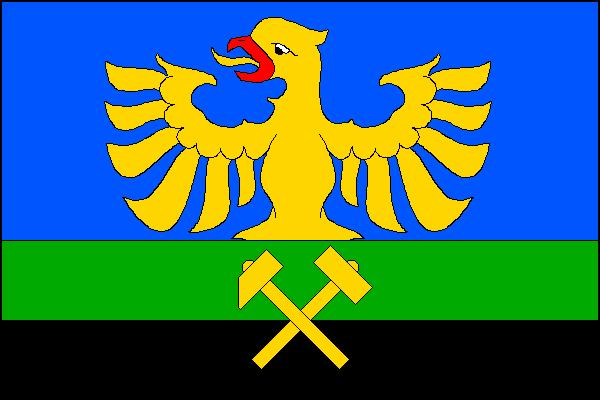
- Flag Coat of arms

- Location in the Czech Republic
- Coordinates: 49°49′38″N 18°23′9″E
- Country: Czech Republic
- Region: Moravian-Silesian
- District: Karviná
- First mentioned: 1305

Government
  - Mayor: Jiří Lukša

Area
  - Total: 12.63 km^{2} (4.88 sq mi)
- Elevation: 265 m (869 ft)

Population (2026-01-01)
  - Total: 7,350
  - Density: 582/km^{2} (1,510/sq mi)
- Time zone: UTC+1 (CET)
  - Summer (DST): UTC+2 (CEST)
- Postal code: 735 41
- Website: www.petrvald-mesto.cz

Petřvald (Czech pronunciation: [ˈpɛtr̝̊valt]; Polish: Pietwałd, German: Peterswald) is a town in Karviná District in the Moravian-Silesian Region of the Czech Republic. It has about 7,400 inhabitants.

== Geography ==
Petřvald is located east of Ostrava, in its immediate vicinity. It lies in the Ostrava Basin in the historical region of Cieszyn Silesia. The highest point is at 300 m (984 ft) above sea level.

== History ==
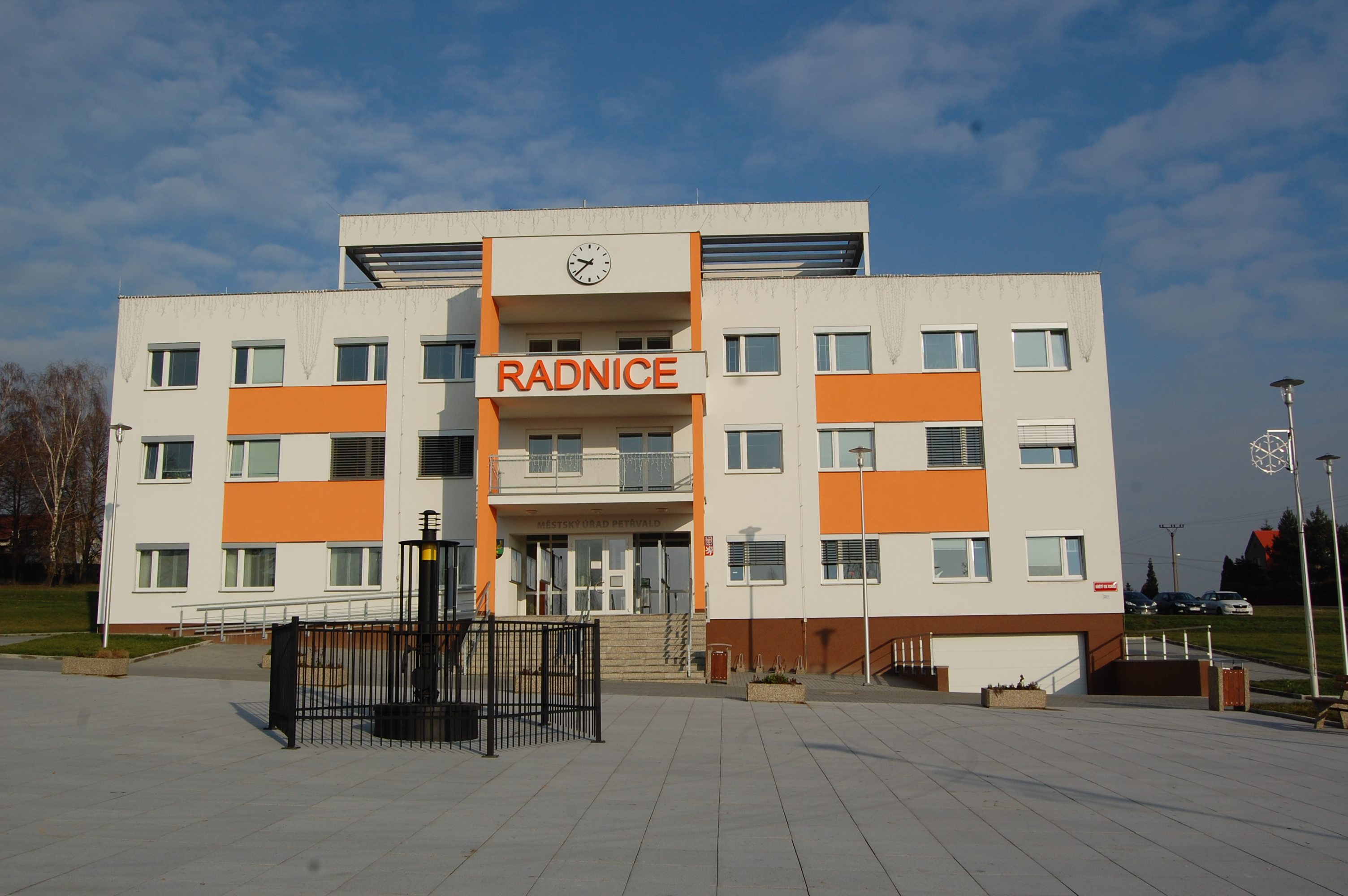
Town hall

The creation of the village was a part of a larger settlement campaign taking place in the late 13th century on the territory of what will be later known as Upper Silesia. The settlement was first mentioned in a Latin document of Diocese of Wrocław called Liber fundationis episcopatus Vratislaviensis from 1305 as Petirwalde.

Politically the village belonged initially to the Duchy of Teschen, ruled by a local branch of Piast dynasty. In 1327 the duchy became a fee of Kingdom of Bohemia, which after 1526 became part of the Habsburg monarchy.

The village became a seat of a Catholic parish, mentioned in the register of Peter's Pence payment from 1447 among 50 parishes of Teschen deaconry as Petirswalde. After 1540s Protestant Reformation prevailed in the Duchy of Teschen and a local Catholic church was taken over by Lutherans. It was taken from them (as one from around fifty buildings in the region) by a special commission and given back to the Roman Catholic Church on 26 March 1654.

In around 1790, Petřvald was bought by the Larisch-Moennich family, who became its most significant owners and held it until the 20th century. In 1833, coal began to be mined here. Two shafts were opened, both owned by the Larisch-Moennich family. In the second half of the 19th century, additional mines were established. Coal mining has fundamentally affected the development of the municipality.

After World War I, Polish–Czechoslovak War and the division of Cieszyn Silesia in 1920, it became a part of Czechoslovakia. Following the Munich Agreement, in October 1938 together with the Trans-Olza region it was annexed by Poland, administratively organised in Frysztat County of Silesian Voivodeship. It was then annexed by Nazi Germany at the beginning of World War II. After the war it was restored to Czechoslovakia.

In 1955, Petřvald became a town. In 1998, coal mining was definitively stopped.

In 2009, a man shot four people in a restaurant in the town. It was the first mass shooting in Czech history since its independence.

== Demographics ==
Historical population

Year	Pop.	±%
1869	2,503	—
1880	2,992	+19.5%
1890	3,994	+33.5%
1900	5,727	+43.4%
1910	7,352	+28.4%

Year	Pop.	±%
1921	9,375	+27.5%
1930	10,275	+9.6%
1950	9,983	−2.8%
1961	9,681	−3.0%
1970	8,120	−16.1%

Year	Pop.	±%
1980	7,382	−9.1%
1991	6,769	−8.3%
2001	6,811	+0.6%
2011	6,848	+0.5%
2021	7,460	+8.9%

Source: Censuses

== Transport ==
The I/59 road from Ostrava to Karviná runs through the town.

== Sights ==
The most important monument is the Church of Saint Henry. A parish church in Petřvald was first mentioned in 1390. The old wooden church was replaced by a new wooden one in the 18th century. The current brick church was built by Jindřich Larisch-Moennich in 1835–1837. The church complex includes the Stations of the Cross.

== Notable people ==
- Vojtěch Mynář (1944–2018), politician
- František Zvardoň (1949–2024), writer and photographer

== Twin towns – sister cities ==
Petřvald is twinned with:

- Jasienica, Poland
- Strumień, Poland
