= Petřvald shooting =

Mass murder in the Czech Republic

Coordinates: 49°49′55.54″N 18°23′33.19″E

- Location: Petřvald, Czech Republic
- Date: 8 March 2009
- Attack type: Mass shooting, mass murder, murder–suicide
- Weapon: Illegal semi-automatic pistol (exact model not known)
- Deaths: 5 (including the perpetrator)
- Perpetrator: Raif Kačar

On 8 March 2009, a mass shooting at the Sokol restaurant in Petřvald, Czech Republic. Raif Kačar, a 42-year-old Macedonian national, shot and killed four people who were celebrating a birthday party and then attempted suicide. The motive was personal disputes, and the weapon used, a semi-automatic pistol, was held illegally. It was the first mass shooting to occur in the Czech Republic since its independence in 1993.

At about 1:00 a.m., Kačar entered the Sokol restaurant, where ten people in the restaurant were celebrating their fifteenth birthday. Immediately after entering, he began shooting at the occupants. According to police, Kačar executed his victims at the scene. Four people were killed: his ex-girlfriend, her father and mother, and his ex-girlfriend's current boyfriend.

The assailant died of his injuries in hospital in Ostrava four days later, on 12 March 2009.
