= Expulsion of Germans from Czechoslovakia =

Forced removal of most Germans from Czechoslovakia after World War II

The expulsion of Germans from Czechoslovakia was the ethnic cleansing of most Germans in Czechoslovakia after World War II. It was part of a broader series of evacuations and deportations of Germans from Central and Eastern Europe during and after World War II.

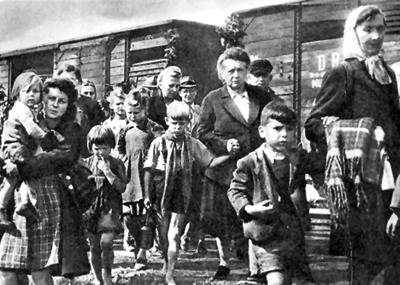
Germans being expelled from the Sudetenland

During the German occupation of Czechoslovakia, the Czech resistance groups demanded the deportation of ethnic Germans from Czechoslovakia. The Czechoslovak government-in-exile had begun calling for the deportation of Germans as early as 1938 and, during the war, obtained the support of the Allies for this proposal. However, a formal decision on the expulsion of the German population was not reached until 2 August 1945, at the conclusion of the Potsdam Conference.

Following the end of the war in Europe on 8 May 1945, forced expulsions, referred to as divoký odsun ('wild transfer') due to their widespread violence and brutality, happened from May until August 1945. On 28 October 1945, Czechoslovak President Edvard Beneš called for the deportation of ethnic Germans from Czechoslovakia (konečné řešení německé otázky, 'final solution of the German question').

The expulsions were carried out by order of local authorities, mostly by groups of armed volunteers. However, in some cases it was initiated or pursued with the assistance of the regular army. Several thousand Germans died violently during the expulsion, with many more perishing from hunger and illness as a result. The expulsion process, according to the Potsdam Conference's decisions, officially began on 25 January 1946 and continued until October 1946. Roughly 1.3 million ethnic Germans were deported to the American zone, and an estimated 800,000 were deported to the Soviet zone.

The expulsions ended in 1948, but not all Germans were expelled; estimates for the total number of non-expulsions range from approximately 160,000 to 250,000, or about 7.6 to 11.9 per cent.

In 1958, the West German government estimated the ethnic German death toll during the expulsion period to be about 270,000, a figure that has been cited in historical literature since then. Research by a joint German and Czech commission of historians in 1995 claimed that the previous demographic estimates of 220,000 to 270,000 deaths were overstated and based on faulty information; they concluded that the actual death toll was at least 15,000 persons, and that it could range up to a maximum of 30,000 persons if one assumes that some deaths were not reported. The commission statement also said that German records show 18,889 confirmed deaths including 3,411 suicides; Czech records indicated 22,247 deaths including 6,667 unexplained cases or suicides.

The German Church Search Service was able to confirm the deaths of 14,215 persons during the expulsions from Czechoslovakia (6,316 violent deaths, 6,989 in internment camps and 907 in the USSR as forced labourers).

== Plans to expel the Sudeten Germans ==
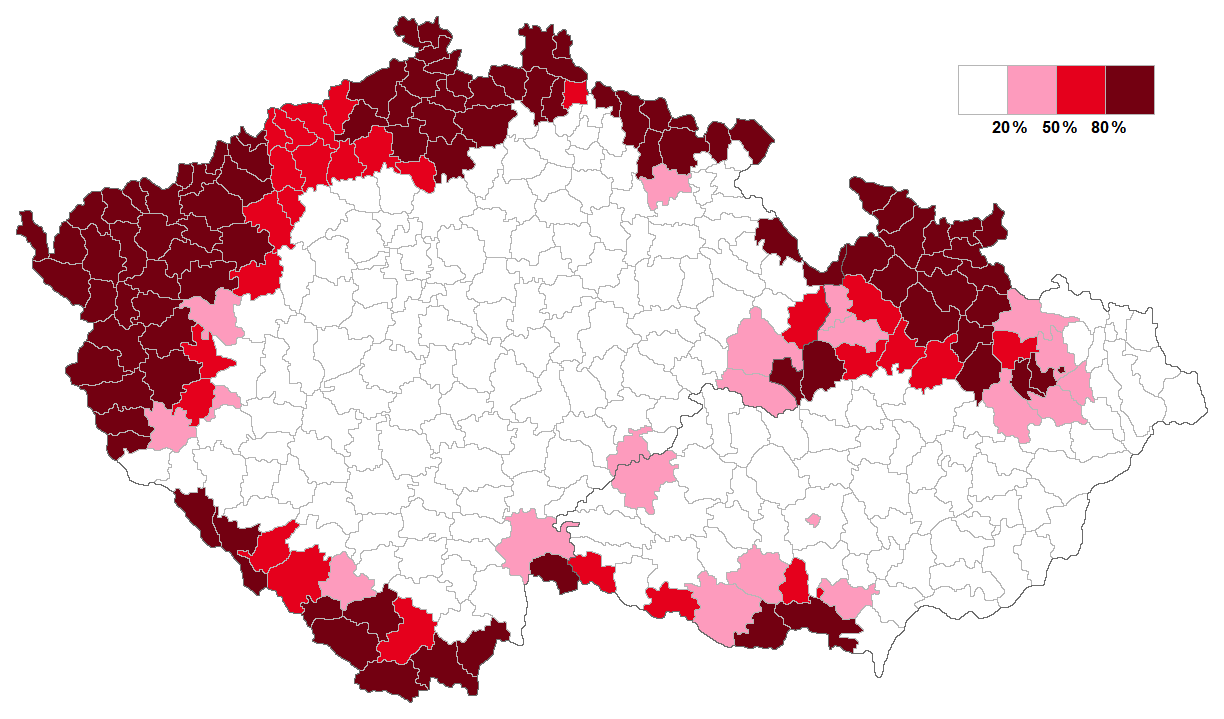
Czech districts with an ethnic German population in 1934 of 20% or more (pink), 50% or more (red), and 80% or more (dark red) in 1935

Following the Munich Agreement of 1938 and the subsequent occupation of Bohemia and Moravia by Hitler in March 1939, Edvard Beneš set out to convince the Allies during World War II that the expulsion of ethnic Germans was the best solution. Expulsion was even supported by Czechs who had moderate views about the Germans. The pro-Nazi Sudeten German Party had gained 88% of ethnic German votes in May 1938.

Almost as soon as German troops occupied the Sudetenland in October 1938, Edvard Beneš and, later, the Czechoslovak government-in-exile, pursued a twofold policy: the restoration of Czechoslovakia to its pre-Munich boundaries, and the removal, through a combination of minor border rectifications and population transfer, of the state's German minority, so as to bolster the territorial integrity of the state. Although the details changed, along with British public and official opinion, and pressure from Czech resistance groups, the broad goals of the Czechoslovak government-in-exile remained the same throughout the war.

The pre-war policy of minority protection was viewed as counterproductive (and the minorities themselves saw it as the source of unrest and instability), because it was associated with the destruction of the Czechoslovak state and its democratic regime. Therefore, Czechoslovak leaders made a decision to change the multi-ethnic character of the state to a state of two or three ethnicities (namely Czechs, Slovaks and, initially, Ruthenians). That goal was to be reached by the expulsion of most of the other minority groups and the successive assimilation of the rest. Because almost all people of German and Magyar ethnicity gained German or Hungarian citizenship during the occupation of Czechoslovakia, the expulsion could be legalised as the banishment (German: Ausweisung) of foreigners.

On 22 June 1942, after plans for the expulsion of the Sudeten Germans had become known, Wenzel Jaksch (a Sudeten German Social Democrat in exile) wrote a letter to Beneš protesting about the proposed plans.

Initially, only a few hundred thousand Sudeten Germans were to be affected – people who were perceived as being disloyal to Czechoslovakia and who, according to Beneš and Czech public opinion, had acted as Hitler's fifth column. Due to the escalation of Nazi atrocities in the Protectorate as the war progressed, there were increasing demands by the Czechoslovak government-in-exile, Czech resistance groups, and the majority of Czechs, for the expulsion of more and more Germans, with no individual investigations or inference of guilt on their part. The only exception was to be 160,000 to 250,000 ethnic German anti-fascists, and those ethnic Germans crucial for industries. The Czechs and their government did not want a future Czechoslovakia to be burdened with a sizable German minority.

The idea of expelling ethnic Germans from Czechoslovakia was supported by the British Prime Minister Winston Churchill and Britain's Foreign Secretary Anthony Eden. In 1942, the Czechoslovak government-in-exile received the formal support of the United Kingdom for the expulsion of Germans from Czechoslovakia and, in March 1943, President Beneš received Moscow's support. In June 1943, Beneš travelled to Washington, D.C., and obtained support for the evolving expulsion plans from President Franklin D. Roosevelt.

During the German occupation of Czechoslovakia, especially after the Nazis' brutal reprisal for the assassination of Reinhard Heydrich, most of the Czech resistance groups demanded the final solution of the German question, which would have to be achieved by transfer or expulsion. Those demands were adopted by the government-in-exile which, beginning in 1943, sought the support of the Allies for the proposal. The April 1945 Košice Program, which outlined the postwar political settlement of Czechoslovakia, stipulated an expulsion of Germans and Hungarians from the country. The final agreement for the transfer of the German minority however was not reached until 2 August 1945 at the end of the Potsdam Conference.

Geoffrey Harrison, who drafted article XIII of the Potsdam Communique concerning the expulsions, wrote on 31 July 1945 to John Troutbeck, head of the German Department at the Foreign Office:

The Sub-Committee met three times, taking as a basis of discussion a draft which I circulated ... Sobolov took the view that the Polish and Czechoslovak wish to expel their German populations was the fulfilment of an historic mission which the Soviet Government were unwilling to try to impede. ... Cannon and I naturally strongly opposed this view. We made it clear that we did not like the idea of mass transfers anyway. As, however, we could not prevent them, we wished to ensure that they were carried out in as orderly and humane manner as possible [...] .

== Germans in Czechoslovakia at the end of the war ==
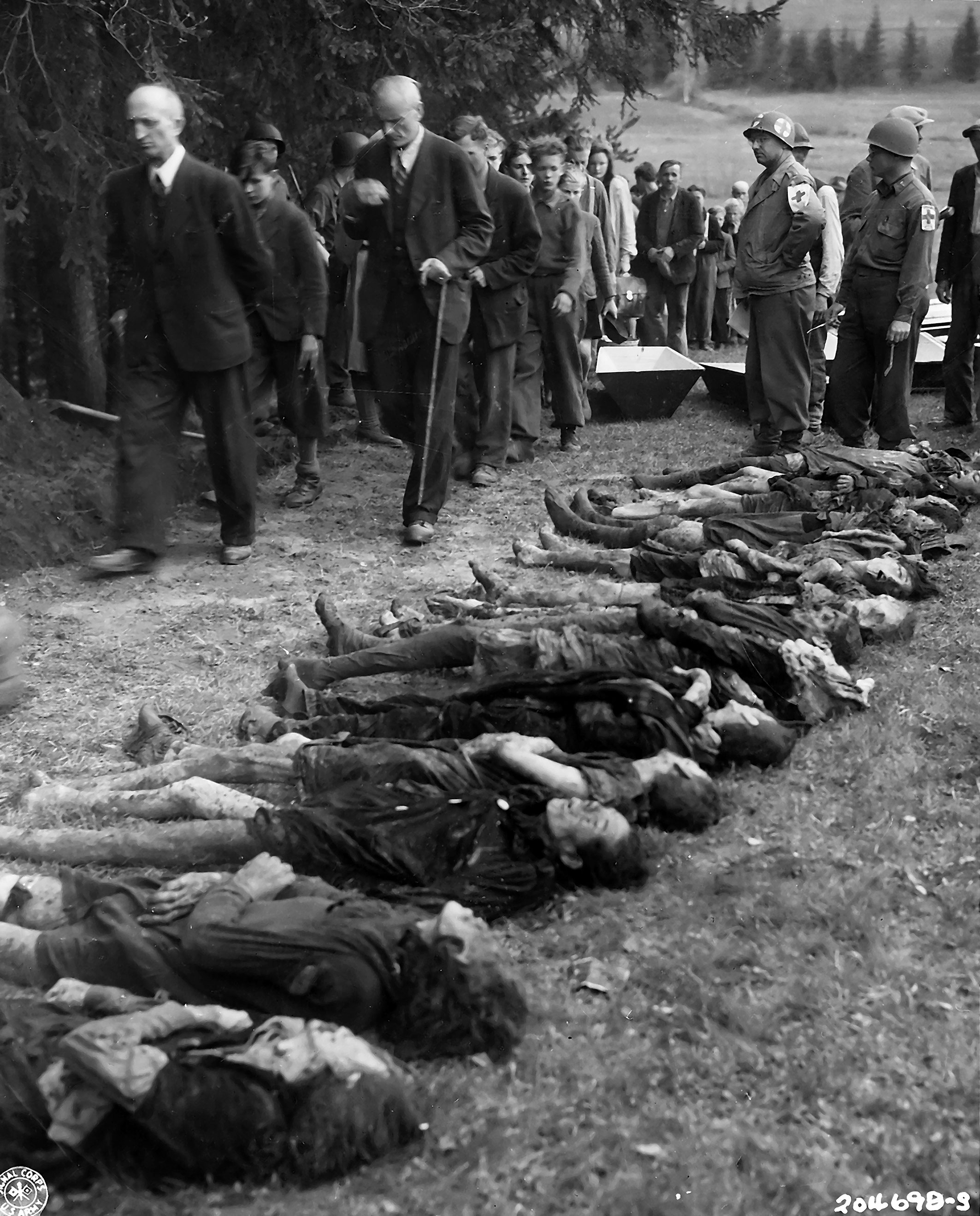
Sudeten Germans are forced to walk past the bodies of 30 Jewish women starved to death by German SS troops in Volary, where a total of 95 women were tortured to death

Developing a clear picture of the expulsion of Germans from Czechoslovakia is difficult because of the chaotic conditions that existed at the end of the war. There was no stable central government and no rigorous record-keeping. Many of the events that occurred during the period were spontaneous and local rather than governmentally directed or centrally coordinated. Among these spontaneous events was the removal and detention of the Sudeten Germans, which was triggered by the strong anti-German sentiment at the grass-roots level and organised by local officials.

According to the Schieder commission, records of food rationing coupons show approximately 3,070,899 inhabitants of occupied Sudetenland in January 1945, which included Czechs and other non-Germans. In addition, most of the roughly 100,000 Carpathian Germans from Slovakia were evacuated on Himmler's orders to the Czech region just before the end of the war. During April and May 1945, an estimated 1.6 million Germans from Polish Silesia fled the advancing Soviet forces and became refugees in Bohemia-Moravia. Thus according to German estimates there were 4.5 million German civilians present in Bohemia-Moravia in May 1945.

== Chronology of the expulsions ==
From London and Moscow, Czech and Slovak political agents in exile followed an advancing Soviet army pursuing German forces westward, to reach the territory of the first former Czechoslovak Republic. Beneš proclaimed the programme of the newly appointed Czechoslovak government on 5 April 1945, in the northeastern city of Košice.

=== Role of the Czechoslovak army ===
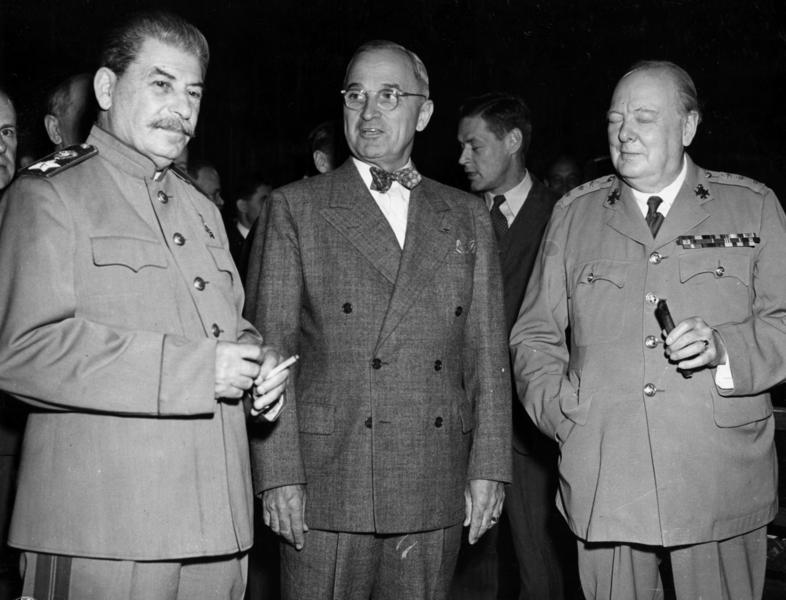
The Potsdam Conference sanctioned the expulsion of Germans from Czechoslovakia

Western Czechoslovakia was liberated by U.S. forces under General Patton. General Zdeněk Novák, head of the Prague military command "Alex", issued an order to "deport all Germans from territory within the historical borders."

A pamphlet issued on 5 June 1945 titled "Ten Commandments for Czechoslovak Soldiers in the Border Regions" directed soldiers that:

the Germans have remained our irreconcilable enemies. Do not cease to hate the Germans ... Behave towards Germans like a victor ... Be harsh to the Germans ... German women and the Hitler Youth also bear the blame for the crimes of the Germans. Deal with them too in an uncompromising way.

On 15 June, a government decree directed the army to implement measures to apprehend Nazi criminals and carry out the transfer of the German population. On 27 July, the Ministry of National Defence issued a secret order directing the transfer should be carried out on as large a scale as possible, and as expeditiously as possible to present the Western powers with a fait accompli.

=== Beneš decrees ===
Between 1945 and 1948, a series of Czechoslovak government decrees, edicts, laws and statutes were proclaimed by the president of the republic, the Prague-based Czechoslovak Parliament, the Slovak National Council (Parliament) in Bratislava and by the Board of Slovak Commissioners (an appendage of the Czechoslovak government in Bratislava).

After the revocation of Munich Agreement had been publicly announced in the British Parliament in August 1942, the British government gave its consent to the transfer of German population from the Czech Crown Lands. President of the United States Franklin D. Roosevelt joined the relocation policy in June 1943. Moscow gave its consent by a declaration on June 5, 1943. The transfer was internationally approved at the Potsdam Conference in July 1945.

Potsdam Agreement: XIII. Orderly Transfers of German Populations.

"The Conference reached the following agreement on the removal of Germans from Poland, Czechoslovakia and Hungary:— The three Governments (The United States, Great Britain and Soviet Union), having considered the question in all its aspects, recognize that the transfer to Germany of German populations or elements thereof, remaining in Poland, Czechoslovakia and Hungary, will have to be undertaken. They agree that any transfers that take place should be effected in an orderly and humane manner."

The conclusions of the Potsdam Conference were confirmed by its signatory states in 1996. The US government, said: "The decisions made at Potsdam ... were soundly based in international law. The conference conclusions have been endorsed many times since in various multilateral and bilateral contexts. ... The conclusions of Potsdam are historical fact and the United States is confident that no country wishes to call them into question". No Czechoslovak/Czech/Slovak legal norm (decree, law, etc.) ever existed that would have dealt with the displacement of the German population.

Decrees 5, 12, 33, 108/1945 concerned the expropriation of wartime traitors and collaborators. Decrees 33/1945 and 108/1945 explicitly stated that the sanctions did not apply to anti-fascists. Typically it was up to the decision of local municipalities. 160,000–250,000 Germans, some anti-fascists, but mostly people crucial for the industry remained in Czechoslovakia.

Decree No. 33/1945 of 2 August 1945. (After the decision made at Potsdam). On the basis of this decree, the Czechoslovak State released from its citizenship those persons who, "in compliance with the regulations of the foreign occupation forces had acquired German or Hungarian citizenship". Czechoslovak citizenship was maintained in the cases of those Germans (280 000) who, at the time of the increasing threat to the Czechoslovak Republic, had officially supported the Czechs, or those who had manifested "their loyalty to the Czechoslovak Republic, had never committed any offence against the Czech and Slovak nations, and who had either actively participated in the struggle for the liberation of the country, or had suffered under Nazi or fascist terror".
The decree was in accordance with the Czechoslovak constitution which did not allow dual citizenship.

Decree No. 5/1945 of 3 June 1945, determining that "any form of property transfer and transaction affecting property rights in terms of movable and immovable assets, and public and private property shall be invalidated, if it was adopted after September 29, 1938, under pressure of the Nazi occupation or national, racial or political persecution" (i.e. this Decree repealed the Nazi confiscation measures adopted against the victims of Nazism).

Decree No. 108/1945 of 25 October 1945: (After the decision made at Potsdam) "There is confiscated, without any compensation properties and property rights which are owned by:

- The German Empire; the Hungarian Kingdom ...
- Private persons of German and Hungarian nationality, (cf. Decree No. 33/1945) except for persons who have proved that they kept loyal to the Czechoslovak Republic ...
- Private persons who have performed activities against independence, autonomy ..., security and defense of the Czechoslovak Republic ..."

The confiscation was based on the international consensus declared in the documents of the Potsdam Conference and the 1945 Paris Agreement. Similar confiscation measure were also taken in other states such as the Netherlands, Belgium, Luxemburg and Denmark.

=== Massacres ===
The 1945 expulsion was referred to as the "wild transfer" (divoký odsun) due to the widespread violence and brutality not only by mobs but also by soldiers, police, and other officials. In the summer of 1945, for instance, there were localised massacres of the German population. The following examples are described in a study done by the European University Institute in Florence:

- 18–19 June 1945, in the Přerov incident, 71 men, 120 women and 74 children (265 Germans) who were Carpathian Germans from Dobšiná were passing through Horní Moštěnice near Přerov railway station. Here they were taken out of the train by Czechoslovak soldiers, taken outside the city to a hill named Švédské šance, where they were forced to dig their own graves and all were shot. The massacre did not become publicly known until the fall of the Communist regime in 1989.
- 20,000 Germans were forced to leave Brno for camps in Austria. Z. Beneš reported 800 deaths.
- On 31 July 1945, during the Ústí massacre, at least 43 German civilians were killed due to violence sparked by the explosion of an ammunition depot in Ústí nad Labem.
- 763 ethnic Germans were shot dead in and around Postelberg (now Postoloprty).

During the "wild transfer" phase, it is estimated that the number of murdered Germans was between 19,000 and 30,000. Accounts indicated that the Czechoslovak government was not averse to "popular justice" as long it did not excessively blacken the country's reputation abroad. There were even government officials who maintained that the massacres at Usti would not have happened if the government dealt with the Germans more harshly.

=== Internment camps ===
According to the German Society Against Expulsion, some Germans were sent to concentration camps. A 1964 report by the German Red Cross stated that 1,215 internment camps were established, as well as 846 forced labour and disciplinary centres, and 215 prisons, on Czechoslovak territory. Special Courts sentenced 21,469 persons to prison and 713 were executed for crimes committed during the Nazi occupation. They made rough estimate claiming 350,000 Germans in Czechoslovakia passed through one or more of these institutions and 100,000 perished. However the Red Cross was able to confirm only 6,989 deaths in the internment camps.

According to Alfred de Zayas:

One of the worst camps in post-war Czechoslovakia was the old Nazi concentration camp of Theresienstadt. Conditions under the new Czech administration are described by H. G. Adler, a former Jewish inmate as follows: ... in the majority they were children and juveniles, who had been locked up only because they were Germans. Only because they were Germans ...? This sentence sounds frighteningly familiar; only the word 'Jews' had been changed to 'Germans'. ... The people were abominably fed and maltreated, and they were no better off than one was used to from German concentration camps.

Further:

The civilian internees who survived to be expelled recorded the horrors of months and years of slow starvation and maltreatment in many thousands of affidavits. Allied authorities in the American and British zones were able to investigate several cases, including the notorious concentration camp at České Budějovice in Southern Bohemia. The deputy commander of this camp in the years 1945–6, Václav Hrneček, later fled Czechoslovakia and came to Bavaria where he was recognized by former German inmates of the camp. Hrneček was brought to trial before an American Court of the Allied High Commission for Germany presided by Judge Leo M. Goodman. The Court based an eight-year sentence against Hrneček upon findings that the Budějovice camp was run in a criminal and cruel way, that although there were no gas chambers and no systematic, organized extermination, the camp was a centre of sadism, where human life and human dignity had no meaning.

Hrneček, who'd spent two years in pre-trial custody, was pardoned by the Allied High Commission after serving another 7 months in prison.

=== Expulsions ===
Germans living in the border regions of Czechoslovakia were expelled from the country in late 1945. The joint German and Czech commission of historians estimated that there were about 15,000 violent deaths. Czech records report 15,000–16,000 deaths not including an additional 6,667 unexplained cases or suicides during the expulsion, and others who died from hunger and illness in Germany as a consequence. In 1946, an estimated 1.3 million ethnic Germans were deported to the American zone. An estimated 800,000 were deported to the Soviet zone.

=== Act No. 115/1946 Coll. ===
On 8 May 1946 the Czechoslovak provisional National Assembly passed Act No. 115/1946 Coll. It was enacted in conjunction with the Beneš decrees and it specifies that "Any act committed between 30 September 1938 and 28 October 1945, 'the object of which was to aid the struggle for liberty of the Czechs and Slovaks or which represented just reprisals for actions of the occupation forces and their accomplices', is not illegal, even when such acts may otherwise be punishable by law." This law, which is still in force, has de facto ensured that no atrocities against Germans during the time-period in question have been prosecuted in Czechoslovakia.

Decree No. 115/1946 of 8 May 1946. Activities (which would otherwise be considered criminal), were not illegal if their "objective was to contribute to the fight for regaining of freedom of Czechs and Slovaks or were aimed at righteous retaliation for deeds of occupants or their collaborators". Inappropriate violence or any other similar excesses were not amnestied. They were always crimes and were always punishable as crimes.Decrees of the President of the Republic, page 27 Without such act, many resistance combatants would be open to criminal prosecutions for their activities against Nazis. The law stipulating that the sentences pronounced against the Czech Resistance fighters during the war had been lawful were valid in Germany until 1997.President Decrees 2.a

However, the Czech government did express its regret in the 1997 Joint Czech–German Declaration on the Mutual Relations and their Future Development:

III. The Czech side regrets that, by the forcible expulsion and forced resettlement of Sudeten Germans from the former Czechoslovakia after the war as well as by the expropriation and deprivation of citizenship, much suffering and injustice was inflicted upon innocent people, also in view of the fact that guilt was attributed collectively. It particularly regrets the excesses which were contrary to elementary humanitarian principles as well as legal norms existing at that time, and it furthermore regrets that Law No. 115 of 8 May 1946 made it possible to regard these excesses as not being illegal and that in consequence these acts were not punished.

II. "The German side acknowledges Germany's responsibility for its role in a historical development, which led to the 1938 Munich Agreement, the flight and forcible expulsion of people from the Czech border area and the forcible breakup and occupation of the Czechoslovak Republic. It regrets the suffering and injustice inflicted upon the Czech people through National Socialist crimes committed by Germans. The German side pays tribute to the victims of National Socialist tyranny and to those who resisted it."Czech–German Declaration 1997

== Results ==
The joint Czech–German commission of historians in 1996 stated the following numbers: the deaths caused by violence and abnormal living conditions amount approximately to 10,000 persons killed; another 5,000–6,000 persons died of unspecified reasons related to expulsion; making the total number of victims of the expulsion 15,000–16,000 (this excludes suicides, which make another approximately 3,400 cases).

The Communist Party controlled the distribution of seized German assets, contributing to its popularity in the border areas, where it won 75 per cent of votes in the 1946 election. Without these votes, the Communist Party would not have achieved a plurality in the Czech lands. The expulsions of Germans are therefore considered a key factor in the success of the 1948 coup.

=== Long-term impact ===
According to a 2020 study, the expulsion of the Germans triggered a depopulation and de-urbanisation of the border areas. Compared to adjacent areas outside the Sudetenland, fewer people work in high-skill sectors such as finance and healthcare. Significantly lower educational enrollment was first observed in 1947 and lower educational achievement is still evident from the results of the 2011 Czech census.

== Legacy ==
The UN Human Rights Committee issued decisions in three cases concerning Sudeten Germans (Des Fours Walderode v. Czech Republic; Petzoldova v. Czech Republic; Czernin v. Czech Republic) in which violations of articles 26 and 14 of the International Covenant on Civil and Political Rights were established and the Czech Republic was ordered to return the property to the rightful owners. As of 2010, they have not been returned. Public opinion surveys indicate that the public is opposed to such measures.

According to an article in the Prague Daily Monitor:

The Czech–German Declaration [of] 1997 has achieved a compromise and expressed regret over the wrongs caused to innocent people by "the post-war expulsions as well as forced deportations of Sudeten Germans from Czechoslovakia, expropriation and stripping of citizenship" on the basis of the principle of collective guilt.

In the Czech–German Declaration of August, 1997:

The German side took full responsibility for the crimes of the Nazi regime and their consequences (the allied expulsion).
"The German side is conscious of the fact that the National Socialist policy of violence towards the Czech people helped to prepare the ground for post-war flight, forcible expulsion and forced resettlement."

"The Czech side regrets that, by the forcible expulsion and forced resettlement of Sudeten Germans from the former Czechoslovakia after the war ..., much suffering and injustice was inflicted upon innocent people." The Czech Republic has not expressed regret for the allied transfer of Sudeten Germans with Nazi-German citizenship or those who had not manifested "their loyalty to the Czechoslovak Republic".

German politicians and the deported Sudeten Germans widely use the word Vertreibung, meaning 'expulsion' or 'drive away', for the events. However, political representatives in both the Czech Republic and Poland, from where millions of Germans had to leave after World War II, usually avoid this expression and rather use the word deportation.

According to the prominent human rights expert, Felix Ermacora, who in World War II served as a private in the German army, the expulsion was "by definition an act of genocide that is, planned in advance, with the intention to destroy a people or group of people on their native soil."

The novelist Reinhard Jirgl portrayed the expulsion and its impact on a family, inspired by his own, in The Unfinished from 2003.

== Compensation to expellees ==
The British Foreign Office and the US State Department planned a "population transfer commission" similar to the arrangement in the Treaty of Lausanne of 1923 to provide compensation for private property to transferred Greeks and Turks following the Kemalist war of 1919–1923. But events went faster and the expulsions began in May 1945, long before the Potsdam Conference and before any agreement on a commission had been settled. No population transfer commission with competence to evaluate the claims of the German expellees was ever established.

Since the Czechoslovak government-in-exile decided that population transfer was the only solution of the German question, the problem of reparation (war indemnity) was closely associated. The proposed population transfer as presented in negotiations with the governments of US, UK and USSR, presumed the confiscation of the Germans' property to cover the reparation demands of Czechoslovakia; then Germany should pay the compensation to satisfy its citizens. This fait accompli was to prevent Germany's evasion of reparation payment as happened after World War I.

This plan was suggested to the Inter-Allied Reparation Agency (IARA) in 1945, but because of the advent of the Cold War was never confirmed by any treaty with Germany. The IARA ended its activity in 1959 and the status quo is as follows: the Czech Republic kept the property of expelled ethnic Germans while Germany did not pay any reparations (only about 0.5% of Czechoslovak demands were satisfied). For this reason, every time the Sudeten Germans request compensation or the abolition of the Beneš decrees, the Czech side strikes back by the threat of reparation demands.

Even during the preparation of the Czech–German declaration, the German side avoided the Czech demand to confirm the status quo by the agreement. However, Germany adopted the Czechoslovak fait accompli and has paid compensation to the expellees. One source claims the German government paid about DM 141 billion to the expellees until 1993. Other sources state an overall amount of roughly €60 billion, equivalent to €64.2 billion in 2021, paid out as partial compensation via the Lastenausgleich ('burden equalization') to all citizens of Germany and ethnic-German expellees – a group of 15 million people alone – affected by property loss due to consequences of the war. The payout to Germans from Czechoslovakia can be assumed to represent a much smaller fraction of that sum.

In contrast to Germany, the issue of compensation of expellees was, at least nominally, closed by several treaties with Austria and Hungary. The most important follow:

- Treaty of 3 February 1964: According to this treaty, Czechoslovakia pledged to satisfy all demands of Hungary and Hungarian citizens related to confiscations by paying 20 million CSK.
- Treaty of 19 December 1974: According to this treaty, Czechoslovakia pledged to pay 1 trillion ATS to cover the property demands of Austrian citizens and waived all former territory and all other demands of country or individuals against Austria. The Austrian side waived all demands against ČSSR and pledged to not support any demands of individuals against the ČSSR related to expulsion.

In February 2025, the Czech government announced a multi-million crown subsidy from the Ministry of Regional Development to support the maintenance of abandoned Sudeten German graves. Following World War II, the expulsion of over three million Germans from Czechoslovakia led to the neglect of numerous German cemeteries. Many municipalities, like Radonice, have struggled to preserve these sites due to limited resources. Historian Martin Krsek emphasises that these graves hold significant historical and artistic value, serving as chronicles of past communities. The new funding aims to assist local authorities in preserving this neglected part of the nation's heritage.

== See also ==
- List of ethnic cleansing campaigns
- Ústí massacre
- Brno death march

== Sources ==
- Beneš, Z.; Kural, V. (2002). Facing History: The Evolution of Czech–German Relations in the Czech Provinces, 1848–1948. Prague: CES. ISBN 978-80-86010-64-9.
- Biman, S.; Cílek, R. (1989). Poslední mrtví, první živí (in Czech). Ústí nad Labem. ISBN 80-7047-002-X.
- Cohen-Pfister, Laurel; Wienroeder-Skinner, Dagmar (2012). Victims and Perpetrators: 1933–1945: (Re)Presenting the Past in Post-Unification Culture. Berlin: Walter de Gruyter. ISBN 978-3-11-018982-7.
- Eberhardt, Piotr (2002). Ethnic Groups and Population Changes in Twentieth-Century Central-Eastern Europe: History, Data, Analysis. M.E. Sharpe. ISBN 0-7656-0665-8.
- Hoensch, Jörg K.; Lemberg, Hans (2001). Begegnung und Konflikt. Schlaglichter auf das Verhältnis von Tschechen, Slowaken und Deutschen 1815–1989 (in German). Bundeszentrale für politische Bildung. ISBN 3-89861-002-0.
- Kenety, Brian (14 April 2005). "Memories of World War II in the Czech Lands: the expulsion of Sudeten Germans". Radio Prague International.
- Köpcke, Monika (1 September 2017). "'Zur Liquidierung unserer inneren Kriegsschuld'" ['For the Liquidation of Our Internal War Guilt']. Deutschlandfunk (in German).
- Maguire, Richard; Carmichael, Cathie, eds. (2015). The Routledge History of Genocide. London: Routledge. ISBN 978-0-415-52996-9. OCLC 908389544.
- Schwarz, Karl-Peter (18 June 2015). "Verbrechen an Vertriebenen: Das Massaker von Prerau" [Crimes Against Displaced Persons: The Prerau Massacre]. Frankfurter Allgemeine Zeitung (in German).
- Spiegel, Silke, ed. (1989). Vertreibung und Vertreibungsverbrechen 1945–1948. Bericht des Bundesarchivs vom 28. Mai 1974. Archivalien und ausgewählte Erlebnisberichte [Expulsion and Crimes Committed During Expulsion, 1945–1948. Report of the Federal Archives, May 28, 1974. Archival Materials and Selected Eyewitness Accounts] (in German). Bonn: Kulturstiftung der deutschen Vertriebenen. ISBN 3-88557-067-X. OCLC 21976261.
- Statistisches Bundesamt Wiesbaden (1958). Die deutschen Vertreibungsverluste. Bevölkerungsbilanzen für die deutschen Vertreibungsgebiete 1939/50 [German Expulsion Losses. Population Balances for the German Expulsion Areas 1939/50] (in German). Stuttgart: Kohlhammer Verlag.
- Testa, Patrick A (2021). "The Economic Legacy of Expulsion: Lessons from Post-War Czechoslovakia". The Economic Journal. 131 (637): 2233–2271. doi:10.1093/ej/ueaa132.
- Wallace, P. (11 March 2002). "Putting the Past to Rest". Time. Archived from the original on 14 March 2005.
- Wiegrefe, Klaus [in German] (20 August 2010). "How Winston Churchill Stopped the Nazis". Der Spiegel. Translated by Sultan, Christopher.
- Zayas, Alfred M. de (1977). Nemesis at Potsdam. London: Routledge & Kegan Paul. ISBN 0-7100-8468-4.
- Zayas, Alfred M. de (1994). A Terrible Revenge. New York: Palgrave/Macmillan.
