= Dobronín =

- Municipality
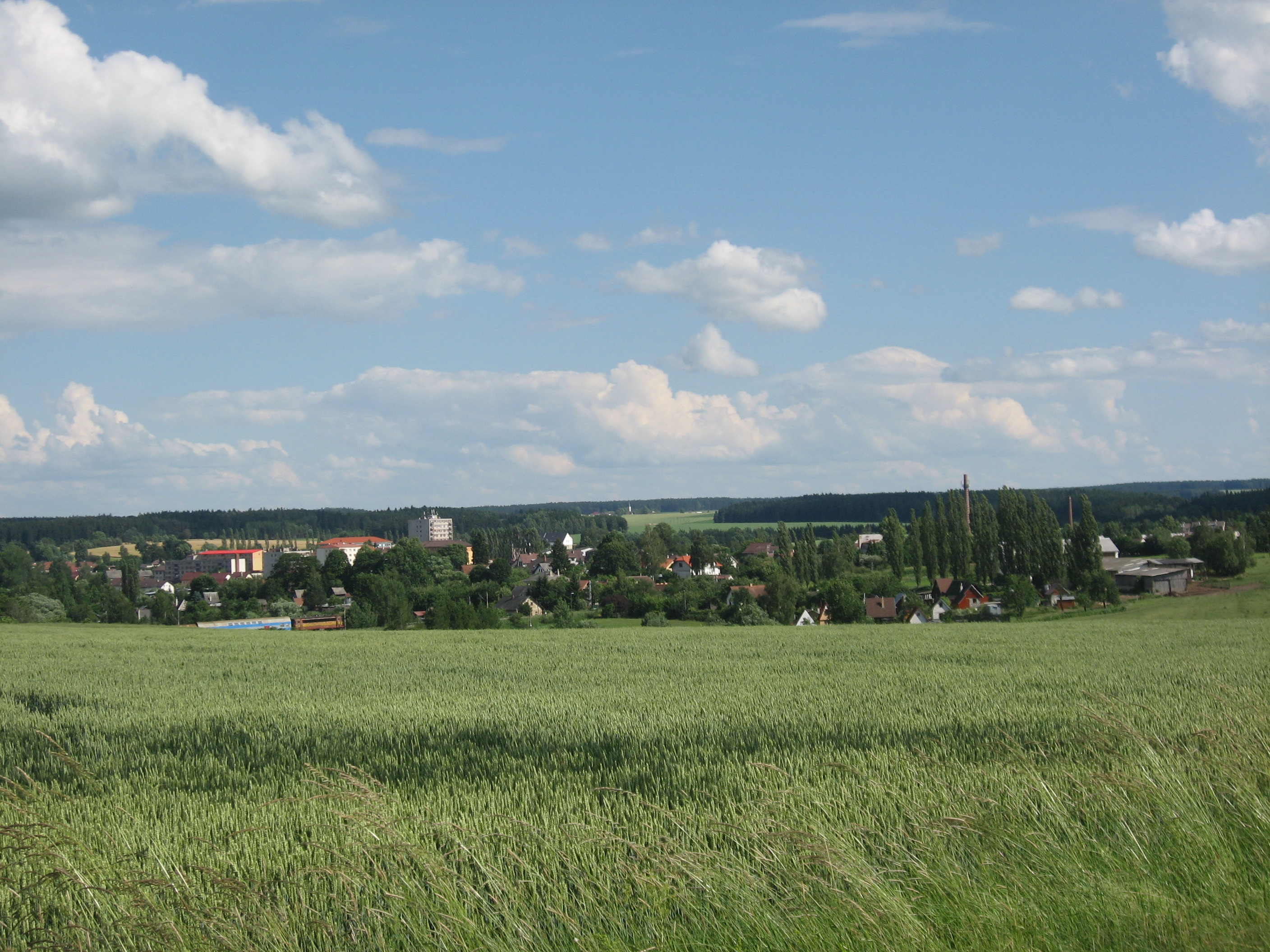
- View from the northwest

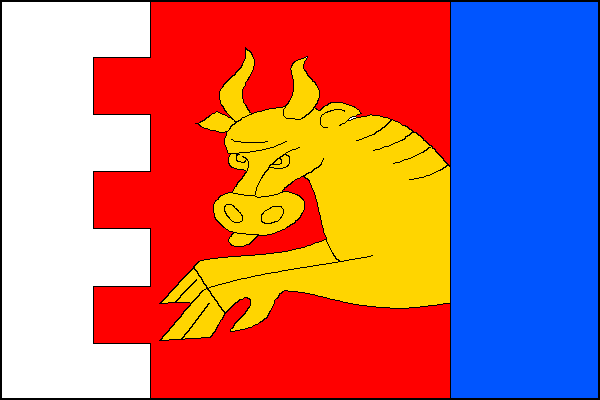
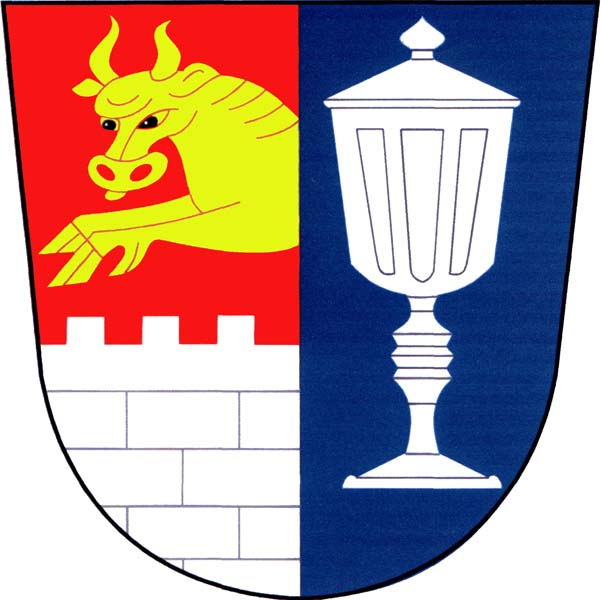
- Flag Coat of arms

- Location in the Czech Republic
- Coordinates: 49°28′42″N 15°39′0″E
- Country: Czech Republic
- Region: Vysočina
- District: Jihlava
- First mentioned: 1351

Area
  - Total: 13.72 km^{2} (5.30 sq mi)
- Elevation: 475 m (1,558 ft)

Population (2026-01-01)
  - Total: 1,851
  - Density: 134.9/km^{2} (349.4/sq mi)
- Time zone: UTC+1 (CET)
  - Summer (DST): UTC+2 (CEST)
- Postal code: 588 12
- Website: www.dobronin.cz

Dobronín (Czech pronunciation: [ˈdobroɲiːn]; German: Dobrenz) is a municipality and village in Jihlava District in the Vysočina Region of the Czech Republic. It has about 1,900 inhabitants.

== Etymology ==
The name is derived from the personal name Dobroň.

== Geography ==
Dobronín is located about 8 kilometres (5 mi) northeast of Jihlava. It lies mostly in the Upper Sázava Hills. A small northwestern part of the municipal territory lies in the Křemešník Highlands and includes the highest point of Dobronín at 534 m (1,752 ft) above sea level. The stream Zlatý potok flows through the municipality. The territory of Dobronín is rich in fishponds.

== History ==
The first written mention of Dobronín is from 1351. An unconfirmed mention is documented already in 1233. Today's municipality of Dobronín was established in 1948 by merger of villages of Dobronín and Německý Šicendorf.

In May 1945, after World War II, local Czechs massacred more than dozen local ethnic German civilians. Since 2009, police investigation continues in that case, as more human remains are unearthed in the village.

== Demographics ==
Historical population

Year	Pop.	±%
1869	708	—
1880	942	+33.1%
1890	1,193	+26.6%
1900	1,254	+5.1%
1910	1,169	−6.8%

Year	Pop.	±%
1921	1,376	+17.7%
1930	1,526	+10.9%
1950	1,257	−17.6%
1961	1,437	+14.3%
1970	1,502	+4.5%

Year	Pop.	±%
1980	1,608	+7.1%
1991	1,757	+9.3%
2001	1,905	+8.4%
2011	1,872	−1.7%
2021	1,800	−3.8%

Source: Censuses

== Transport ==
Dobronín is located on the railway line Jihlava–Havlíčkův Brod.

== Sights ==
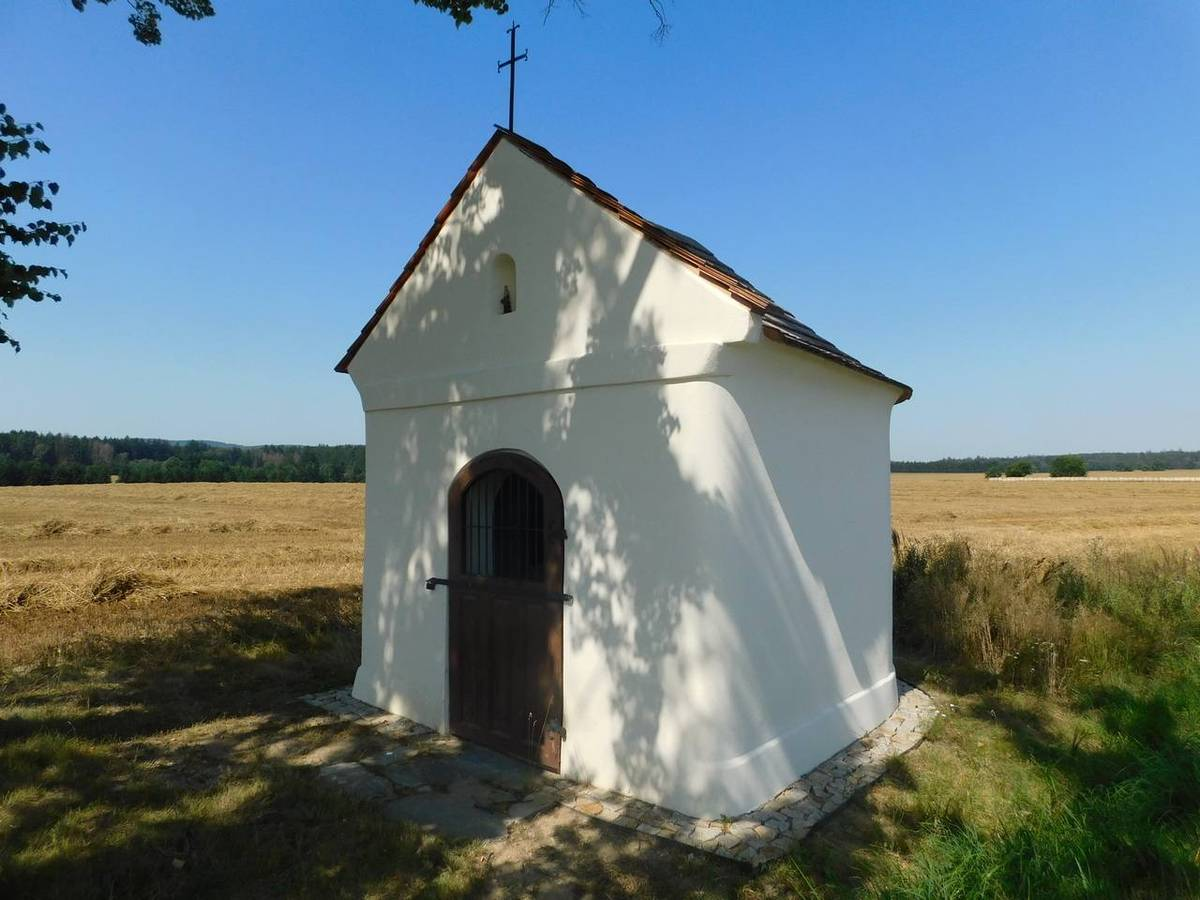
Neoclassical chapel

The only protected cultural monument in the municipality is a small Neoclassical chapel from the second quarter of the 19th century.

== Twin towns – sister cities ==
Dobronín is twinned with:

- Bellmund, Switzerland
