= Franz Strasser =

Third Reich public official and convicted murderer

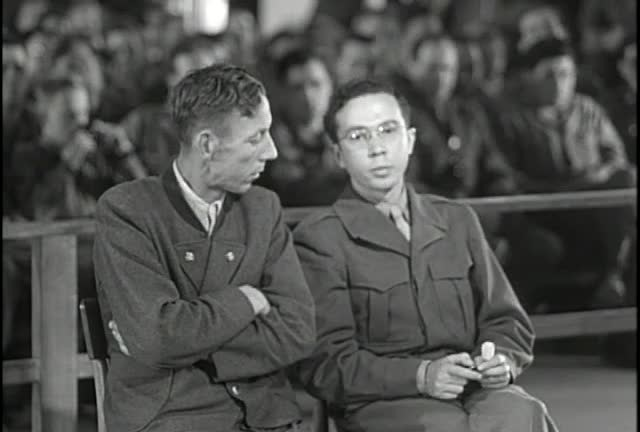
- Strasser (left) listens to his court-appointed interpreter, U.S. Sergeant Sessler (right), during his trial
- Born: 10 September 1899; Grünau im Almtal, Austria-Hungary
- Died: 10 December 1945 (aged 46); Landsberg Prison, Allied-occupied Germany
- Occupations: Former NSDAP Kreisleiter and convicted war criminal
- Spouse: Unknown wife
- Children: 3
- Status: Executed by hanging
- Conviction: War crimes
- Trial: Dachau trials
- Penalty: Death

Details
- Victims: 5 (3/4 as an accomplice)
- Date: 9 December 1944
- Country: Protectorate of Bohemia and Moravia
- Target: American POWs
- Date apprehended: June 1945

Franz Xaver Strasser (10 September 1899 – 10 December 1945) was an Austrian Nazi Party Kreisleiter (district leader) and war criminal. Strasser was the first war criminal to be judged at the Dachau trials.

== Action ==
On 9 December 1944, in Kaplice in the Protectorate of Bohemia and Moravia (present-day Czech Republic), Franz Strasser killed two American airmen of the USAAF by shooting them with a Thompson submachine gun. They were members of a group of five airmen of the 20th Bomb Squadron who stayed with pilot Woodruff Warren when he landed their plane in a field. They had voluntarily surrendered and were taken away in a truck, accompanied by Strasser and Captain Karl Lindemeyer, the chief of police of the city. During Strasser's trial, evidence showed that Lindemeyer had killed three or four of the airmen, and the verdict suggested the murders were originally Lindemeyer's idea.

The five men killed:

- Woodruff J. Warren of Maryland
- Donald L. Hart of Massachusetts
- Frank Pinto Jr. of Texas
- George D. Mayott of New York
- Joseph Cox of Alabama

== Arrest, trial, and execution ==
After Germany's surrender, U.S. Army officials sought four men for their involvement in the shootings: Strasser and Lindemeyer, and Hermann Nelböck and Walter Wolf, both of whom had accompanied Strasser on the drive to where the airmen were shot. Strasser was arrested in June 1945. Neither Nelböck nor Wolf were ever apprehended, albeit the court in Strasser's trial concluded they had no involvements in the actual murders. Lindemeyer could not be tried since he killed himself on 8 May 1945.

On 24 August 1945, Strasser was tried by a U.S. military court in Dachau, which provided a translator for him during the trial. He was found guilty of committing war crimes and was sentenced to death by hanging. On 10 December 1945, Strasser was hanged at Landsberg Prison.
