= Tocov =

- Village
- Location within Czech Republic
- Coordinates: 50°18′25.92″N 13°04′58.08″E
- Country: Czech Republic
- Kraj: Karlovy Vary Region
- Okres: Karlovy Vary District

Population (2020)
  - Total: 0
- Time zone: UTC+1 (CET)
  - Summer (DST): UTC+2 (CEST)

Tocov (Czech pronunciation: [ˈtotsof], German: Totzau) is an abandoned Sudeten German settlement located in the Hradiště military training area four kilometers southeast of Stráž nad Ohří. It lies in the Doupov Mountains at an altitude of 590 m on the Petrovský creek.

== History ==
The village was first mentioned in 1369 and became independent in 1850; till then it belonged to the town Doupov (German: Duppau). The village was inhabited mainly by Germans, who were expulsed after World War II. In an incident in May 1945 31 Germans were killed in retaliation for the killing of a policeman and the injuring of another who searched for allegedly hidden Nazis from the district centre of Kaaden.

== Demography ==
Historical population

| Year | Pop. | ±% |
|---|---|---|
| 1869 | 600 | — |
| 1880 | 609 | +1.5% |

| Year | Pop. | ±% |
|---|---|---|
| 1890 | 543 | −10.8% |
| 1900 | 541 | −0.4% |

| Year | Pop. | ±% |
|---|---|---|
| 1910 | 600 | +10.9% |
| 1921 | 577 | −3.8% |

| Year | Pop. | ±% |
|---|---|---|
| 1930 | 561 | −2.8% |
| 1950 | 34 | −93.9% |
