= Vladimír Lulek =

Czech mass murderer

Vladimír Lulek (21 May 1953 – 2 February 1989) was a Czech mass murderer who killed his wife and four children on 22 December 1986, and also attempted to kill his neighbour. He was born in Šťáhlavy in 1953, and executed on 2 February 1989 at Pankrác Prison in Prague.

== Background ==
Lulek's background included numerous criminal convictions for theft, robbery, and bodily harm. He was in prison for almost seven years between 1972 and 1979. Vladimír and Jaroslava married in 1983. He reports their marriage was good in the beginning but then the two began to drink heavily together. During this period, they would fight constantly about money. According to family and neighbors, Lulek reportedly beat her and threw knives at her but she refused to back down no matter how dangerous or violent her husband became towards her. The neighbours reported constant yelling and arguments erupting from their apartment.

== Murder ==
On 22 December 1986, Lulek's wife, Jaroslava, and 12-year-old daughter, Vendula, were home preparing the house for Christmas while the other two children slept. Meanwhile, Lulek was in town drinking at a pub and returned to his apartment with a new acquaintance from the bar. His wife is frustrated by this and tells him so. The two begin to argue and the disagreement escalates when Lulek walks away and returns with a knife and knife sharpener. His wife stops speaking, as he stares her down sharpening his knife. When she finally spoke, he hit her in the head with the sharpening block twice, knocking her to the floor. She attempted to escape out of the apartment but he ran up to her and began stabbing her in the back. The new acquaintance attempted to intervene and suffered a minor injury before fleeing out the door.

A neighbor hearing the attack, tries to provide first aid to his wife who had been stabbed 36 times. Lulek comes back into the hallway and stabs the neighbour in the stomach. Thankfully, the neighbour was able to get medical intervention in time to save their life. In the meantime, Lulek had gone to the two children who lay in bed sleeping, seven-year-old Kateřina and eight-year-old Přemysl, and stabbed them to death. When police arrived, they found twelve-year-old Vendula and one-year-old Vladimíra also dead in the apartment. Lulek then attempted to slash his own wrists and throat but did not die.

== Trial and execution ==
During his trial, Lulek went on a hunger strike and feigned mental illness as a means to avoid execution. During the duration of his trial, he refused to speak but continued to write coherent, well-thought-out letters to his parents. After assessment by the forensic psychiatric team, he was deemed incapable of rehabilitation. After sitting awaiting his death for 25 months, he was hanged on 2 February 1989.

He was the last person executed in what is today the Czech Republic. (Note: Štefan Svitek was the last person executed in entire Czechoslovakia, on 8 June 1989.)
