= Battle for Czechoslovak Radio =

- Part of Warsaw Pact invasion of Czechoslovakia
Date	21 August 1968
Location	Prague, Czechoslovakia
Result	Soviet victory: Red Army ceased the building of the radio and its activity.

Belligerents
Czechoslovakia	Soviet Union

Strength
500 people	Infantry and 6 tanks

Casualties and losses
17 killed	3 tanks destroyed

The Battle for Czechoslovak Radio was a clash between Czechoslovak citizens defending Czechoslovak Radio and soldiers of the Soviet Army during the 1968 Warsaw Pact invasion of Czechoslovakia. 17 unarmed Czechoslovak citizens were killed defending the Czechoslovak Radio on Vinohradská Street in Prague from occupation troops of the Soviet Army. When the Soviet troops tried to break into the radio building, its defenders threw stones and broke through the external diesel fuel tanks of the tanks with pickaxes, which they set fire to, managing to destroy several tanks. The encounter became a symbol of the resistance of the people of Prague against Warsaw Pact forces during the invasion of Czechoslovakia.

== Background ==
On January 5, 1968, Alexander Dubček became the first secretary of the Central Committee of the KSČ. It marked the beginning of the so-called Prague Spring. This process began to worry other Eastern Bloc countries, including the USSR. The leadership of the Soviet Union initially attempted to stop or limit the changes in the Czechoslovakia through a series of warnings. After a series of unsuccessful negotiations on the night of August 20 to August 21, 1968, the troops of the five Warsaw Pact states launched an invasion of Czechoslovakia. One of the first targets was Czechoslovak radio, which broadcast uncensored information about the invasion of Warsaw Pact troops and called for Passive resistance to the occupiers. Vladimír Fišer, Eva Kopecká, Věra Šťovíčková, Jiří Dienstbier, Ondřej Neff and others spoke to the audience from the radio. The fighting began at 5 AM.

== Events ==
A crowd of about five hundred people gathered in front of the building of the Central Committee of the Communist Party of the Czech Republic, but it was still occupied by Soviet soldiers, who opened fire on the demonstrators. 4 people died in the massacre. Around seven o'clock, the fighting moved to the radio station. Demonstrators built a high barricade in the direction of Wenceslas Square. A few hundred men attempted to stop the advance of Soviet troops on the square.

At half past six, six Soviet tanks arrived directly in front of the radio station. The demonstrators attacked the tanks with stones, but then got into a heated discussion with their crews. This tense situation lasted for several hours. After one tank drove into a truck barricade and caught fire, the situation changed. One of the defenders of the barricade climbed on top of the tank and started waving the Czechoslovak flag. The driver of the tank attempted to remove the demonstrator by maneuvering his tank, but was unsuccessful. Eventually, the demonstrator was shot dead by one of the soldiers. The Soviet troops responded to the unrest by firing on the demonstrators, causing most of them to disperse. Most of the demonstrators withdrew to Wenceslas Square and the surrounding areas. Many demonstrators were wounded and killed in the massacre, causing the demonstrators set up an emergency infirmary at the fountain under the National Museum. In the afternoon, gunfire could be heard from the Vinohradská třída and houses near Hajnovka were on fire, with the radio under control of Soviet forces.

== In popular culture ==
Battle for Czechoslovak Radio is covered in the 2024 Czech film Waves.
