= Štefan Svitek =

Slovak murderer (1960–1989)

Štefan Svitek (23 January 1960 – 8 June 1989) was a Slovak murderer, sadist and animal abuser. He is known for being the man who killed and butchered his pregnant wife and two daughters in 1987. He was dubbed Štefan the Beast (Slovak: Beštia Štefan) and "Upper Hron Ripper (Slovak: Horehronský rozparovač) by newspapers. For this crime, Svitek was sentenced to death. He was the last person executed in Czechoslovakia.

== Background ==
Svitek was born on 23 January 1960, Podbrezová. He had 4 siblings and lived in a rural, forested area. His mother died when he was 18 and his father was a violent alcoholic who abused his family often. At the age of 13, he began to consume alcohol on a near daily basis. He often engaged in various forms of self-harm including cutting himself with razors or pieces of glass. He used wire to stab into his stomach on various occasions, too and stuck red-hot needles into his genitals. In his adolescent he also began his abuse of animals. He used a broken bottle to castrate a bull and mutilate the udders of a cow. Once he hit puberty at the age of 14, he began engaging in bestiality with the farm animals.

At 16 his sexual sadism fantasies began to manifest into action. During this time he began raping a developmentally disabled woman. He kidnapped her, holding her captive to use for sex, and torture. She ultimately survived the attacks, though. Next, he attacked and attempted to rape a woman in a cemetery in Brezno at knifepoint. He expressed sexual satisfaction at seeing the blood run down her face after hitting her. Another person in the cemetery interrupted his attack and he fled. In 1979, after dropping out of school he was charged with four charges: theft, robbery, animal cruelty, and rape. Svitek was sent to prison for this and the court also forced him to go through alcohol rehab and psychiatric treatment, however he was released only after 5 months.

When Svitek got out, he seemingly got his life back together. He found a decent job, married a woman called Mária Sviteková and adopted her daughter from her previous marriage. During his testimony, he admitted that he had a month long affair with another woman but returned to Maria. He said she was understanding and forgave him for the transgression. However, it did not take too long before he started excessively drinking again and violently abusing his own family, like his father did before him.

== Murder ==
On 30 October 1987, Svitek had been out drinking at a local pub in Brezno and came home angry to find his wife and two daughters were not home. They had gone to the summer house because they knew he was violent when he drank. He showed up to the summer home, furious and demanding to be let in. His wife ignored his request and told him to go home instead. He found an axe and broke down the door and decapitated his pregnant wife. He then killed his daughter and step-daughter, Anička (4) and Helena (6). He used a knife to cut off the breasts and a razor blade to slash open the body of his pregnant wife and then threw her intestines about the room. He then did the same to his daughters and had sex with their corpses. He then removed the still living 6 month old fetus from his wife's stomach and killed it, and then had sex with the corpse. He said he was so sexually aroused by the ordeal that he masturbated numerous times until dawn. He said he snapped into reality after hearing an animal make noise outside and panicked. He then sloppily put their bodies into potato bags and fled.

Svitek then went on the run. He tried to break into various homes and slept in a cabin following the murders. The next day he ended up at his parents home, at which point he attempted to castrate himself. The first attempt failed because the knife was too dull. Svitek then tried using a razor blade but stopped. Next, he attempted suicide. He hanged himself but the rope snapped under the weight of his body and he came crashing to the floor. Blood continued to pour from his genitals and his head was pounding as he wandered the streets for a few more hours. The scene at his home had been discovered and the police were searching for him. When he saw a police car, he approached it and confessed immediately.

== Trial and execution ==
Forensic psychiatrists and psychologists assessed Štefan and concluded that he was a psychopath. They came to this conclusion after reviewing his history of rape, physical assault, murder of his family, necrophilia, and bestiality. They stated he had a below average IQ of 81 and the abuse suffered at the hands of his father growing up played a major role in the development of his personality. However, they conclusively agreed that he did not suffer from any mental illness, disorder, or psychosis at the time of the murders. He was diagnosed with Alcohol Use Disorder and dependency on analgesics. The forensic psychiatrist, Ľubomír Vražda, testified that rehabilitation for Svitek would be impossible.

After the murder of his wife and daughters, he wrote in a letter from prison: "Now they ask me what kind of punishment I deserve and what kind of punishment I expect. I don't care at all if they give me a rope, prison or psychiatry. Just let me get rid of my stupid ideas and thoughts that have haunted me for years."

During Svitek's recounting of the murder, he expressed the experience was the greatest sexual experience of his life. Additionally, he did not express remorse for his actions and later tried to claim mental illness as the cause of his actions. On 30 May 1988, the chairman-judge announced the verdict in the largest courtroom of the Banská Bystrica Court. Svitek received the death penalty. He attempted to appeal the decision while awaiting execution. The appeal was rejected and the execution was carried out by hanging in Bratislava, on 8 June 1989.

At the age of 29, Štefan Svitek became the last executed criminal in the history of entire Czechoslovakia.

== See also ==
- Vladimír Lulek - the second to last executed person in Czechoslovakia and the last one in what is today the Czech republic
- List of most recent executions by jurisdiction
