= Police of the Czech Republic =

Czech national law enforcement agency

Police of the Czech Republic Policie České republiky
- Abbreviation: PČR
- Motto: Pomáhat a chránit To Help and to Protect

Agency overview
- Formed: 1991
- Preceding agency: Public Security (Czechoslovakia)
- Employees: 40,152

Jurisdictional structure
- Operations jurisdiction: Czech Republic
- Map of Police of the Czech Republic's jurisdiction
- Governing body: Ministry of the Interior (Czech Republic)
- General nature: Civilian police

Operational structure
- Headquarters: Presidium of Police, Prague
- Agency executive: genmjr. Martin Vondrášek, Police President

Website
- www.policie.cz

The Police of the Czech Republic (Czech: Policie České republiky) is the national agency in the field of law enforcement in the Czech Republic. It was established on 15 July 1991 under the jurisdiction of the Ministry of the Interior of the Czech Republic. The agency is tasked with protecting citizens, property and public order and as of 2015, there were around 40,500 employees. Czech state police cooperates with municipal police departments, which are present in some municipalities.

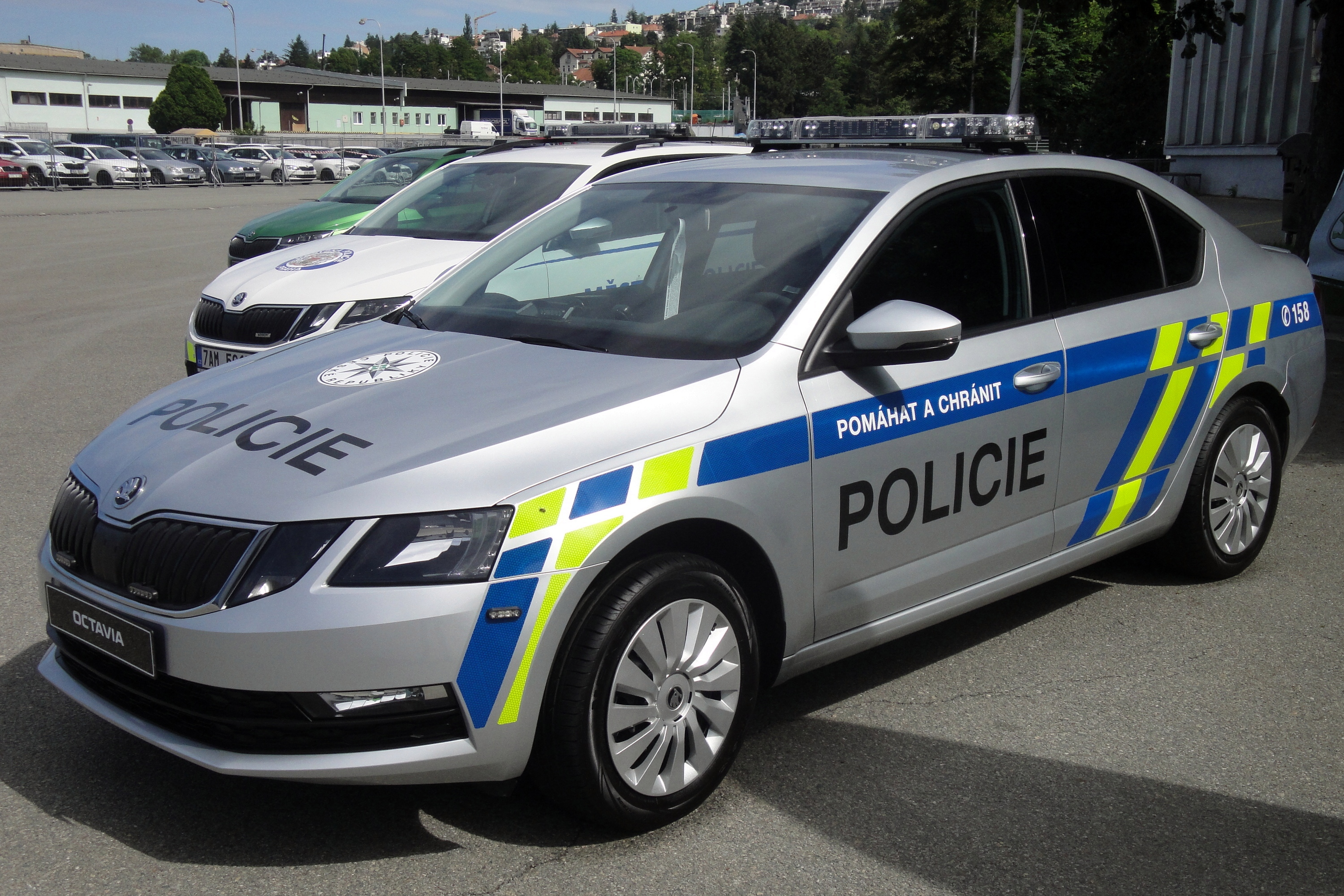
Czech police squad car, Škoda Octavia, in 2019.

== History ==
The Police of the Czech Republic took over land management after the communist SNB in the Czech Republic with the exception of military police (provosts) who are part of the army. Members were recruited from the former communist SNB (National Security Corps), after passing a vetting "democratic" commission established after the Velvet Revolution in 1989 to eliminate from the police force communist ideologues and agents of the secret police. A similar procedure was also undertaken in the then-Slovak Republic. Some police officers were employed by a small federal police force, whose mandate expired on 31 December 1992.

== Jurisdiction and organisation ==
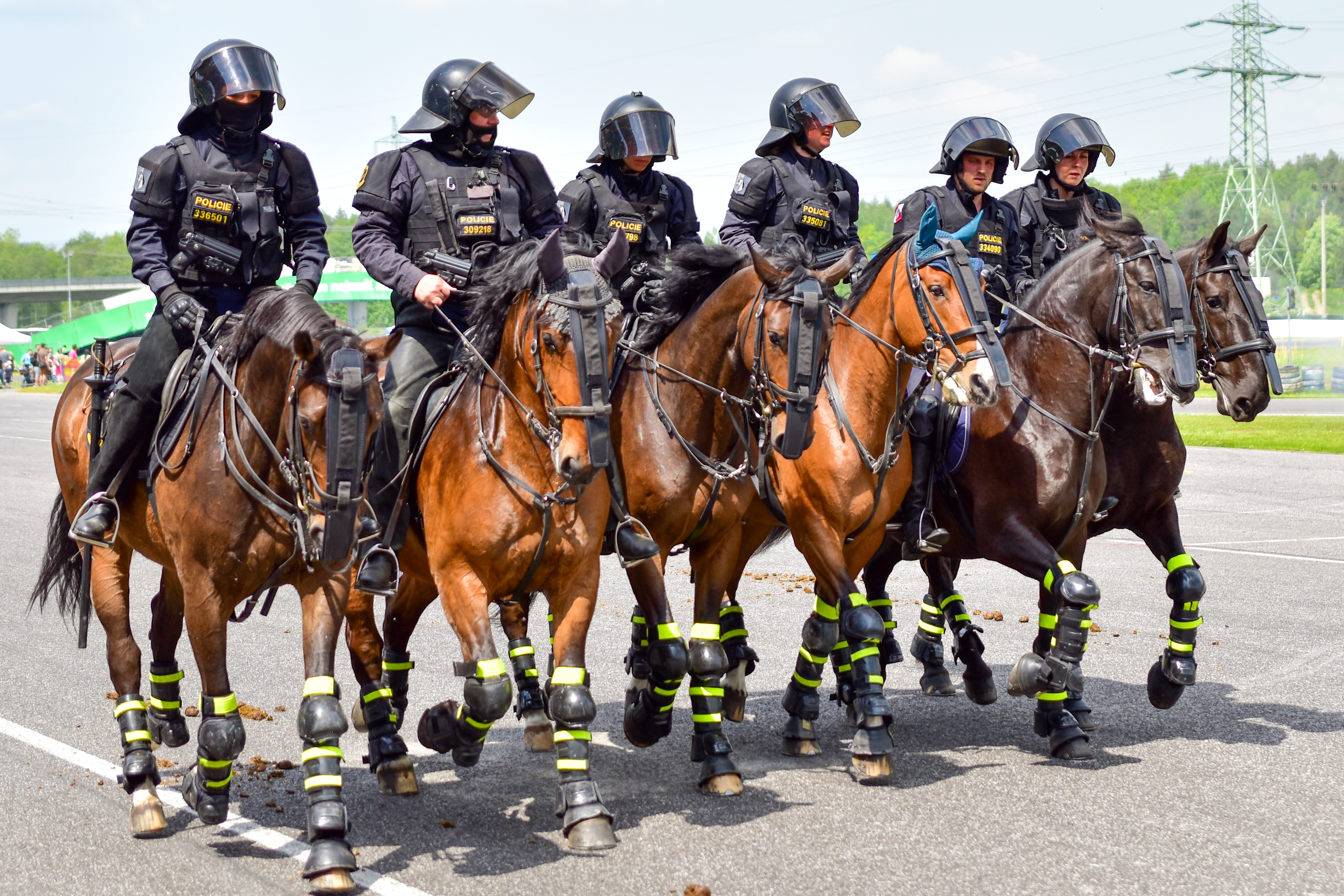
Mounted police

The Police of the Czech Republic has general jurisdiction in the investigation of misdemeanors and crimes. Its proceedings are overseen by an independent prosecutor, who can bring charges in criminal matters. It does not have jurisdiction in fields falling within the competence of other specialized bodies, such as the Customs service, military police, judicial guard or the Secret service. PČR is the main investigative body of the Ministry of the Interior. It should not be confused with the municipal police, which may be established by a municipality and which supervises public order and road safety; municipal police also have jurisdiction only over misdemeanours, and in criminal investigations may serve only in a supportive role for the state police.

The Police of the Czech Republic is responsible for search and rescue operations and on this behalf cooperates with Mountain Rescue Service of the Czech Republic that is highly professional rescue agency.

Some crimes (such as terrorism) are being solved in co-operation with intelligence agencies such as BIS or ÚZSI.

On-duty officers are obliged to carry service weapons depending on the nature of their work (administrative vs. field work) or by their superior executive officer ordinance.

Regardless of being assigned to nationwide or regional units all police officers while on or off-duty have the right (and obligation) to act if the crime or serious offense is happening and life, health or property may be in imminent danger. Civilian employees of police are obliged to act only while on-duty. Generally, police officers are not allowed to carry service weapons while off-duty if not approved by regional or unit police chief, which is on condition that their life may be in serious immediate danger. If a police officer still wants to carry a weapon off-duty, he/she has to use their personal handgun like any other armed citizen. Off-duty officers can use their personal weapon when acting as a police officer (which makes him on-duty).

=== Organisation ===
- Police President of the Czech Republic
  - Office of the Police President
  - First Deputy for External Service (uniformed)
    - Protection Service
    - Explosive Ordnance Disposal Service
    - Aviation Service
    - Police Education and Service Training Unit
    - Directorate of Alien and Border Police Service
    - Directorate of Public Order Police Service
    - Directorate of Traffic Police Service
    - Directorate of Weapons and Security Material Service
  - Deputy for Criminal Police and Investigation Service
    - Bureau of Criminal Police and Investigation Service
    - National Headquarters Against Organized Crime of the CPIS (NCOZ)
    - National Counterterrorism, Extremism, and Cybercrime Agency of the CPIS (NCTEKK)
    - National Drug Headquarters of the CPIS (NPC)
    - Unit for Special Operations of the CPIS (USČ)
    - Unit for Intelligence Gathering of the CPIS (UZČ)
    - Rapid Response Unit (URNA)
    - Office of Documentation and Investigation of Crime of Communism of the CPIS
  - Deputy for Economics
    - Logistics Support Administration
  - Directorate of Administration and Service Support
  - Regional Police Directorates
    - Capital City Prague
    - Central Bohemian Region
    - South Bohemian Region
    - Plzeň Region
    - Karlovy Vary Region
    - Ústí nad Labem Region
    - Liberec Region
    - Hradec Králové Region
    - Pardubice Region
    - South Moravian Region
    - Vysočina Region
    - Zlín Region
    - Moravian-Silesian Region
    - Olomouc Region

=== Police Ranks ===
==== Warrant Officers (Praporčíci) ====
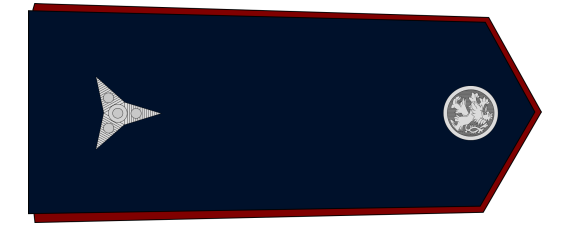
Staff Sergeant (Rotný)

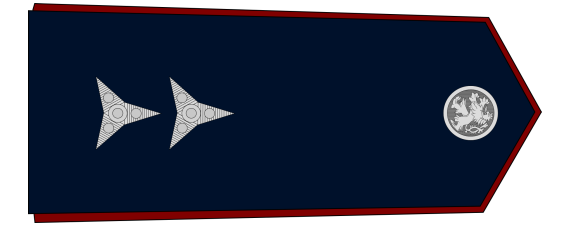
Sergeant (Strážmistr)

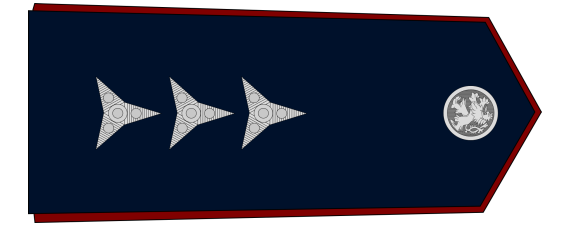
Sergeant (Nadstrážmistr)

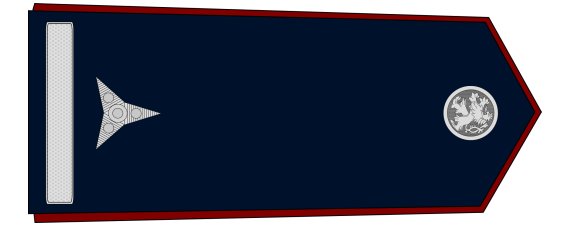
Warrant Officer (Podpraporčík)

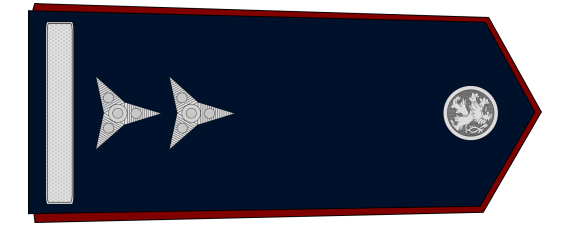
Warrant Officer (Praporčík)

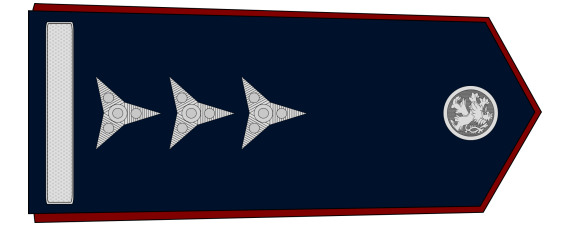
Warrant Officer (Nadpraporčík)

==== Commissioned Officers (Důstojníci) ====
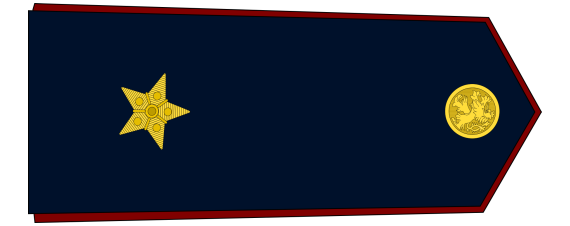
Second Lieutenant (Podporučík)

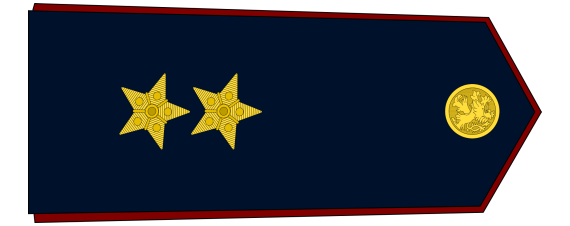
Lieutenant (Poručík)

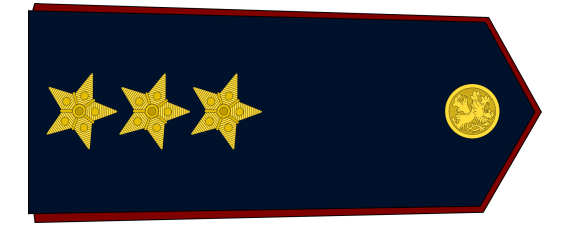
First Lieutenant (Nadporučík)

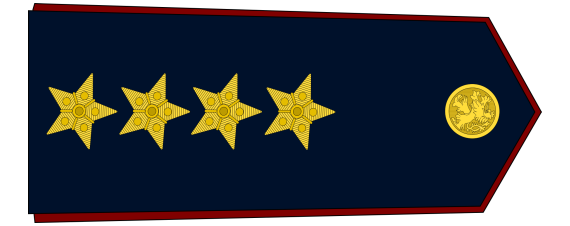
Captain (Kapitán)

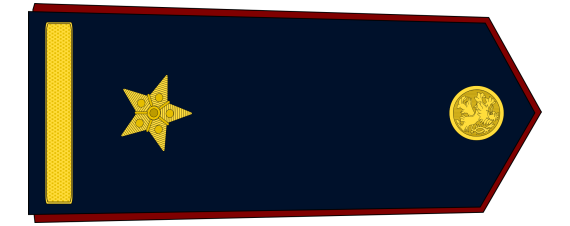
Major (Major)

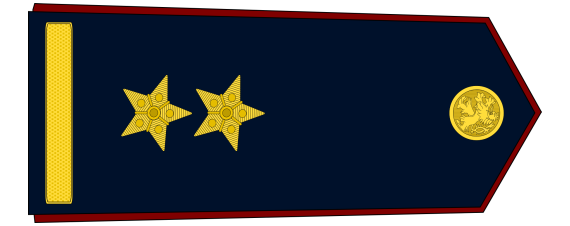
Lieutenant Colonel (Podplukovník)

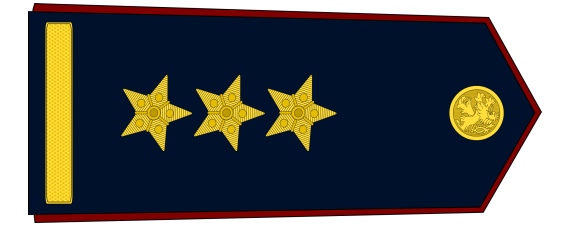
Colonel (Plukovník)

==== Generals (Generálové) ====
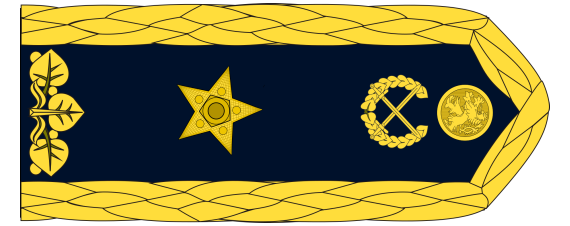
Brigadier General (Brigádní generál)

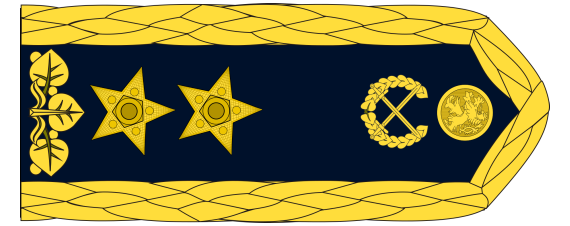
Major General (Generálmajor)

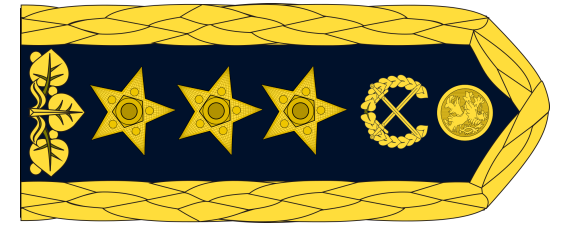
Lieutenant General (Generálporučík)

=== Nationwide jurisdiction ===
- Institute of Criminalistics Prague
- Aviation Service
- National Headquarters Against Organized Crime of the Criminal Police and Investigation Service - created in August 2016 by joining two nationwide operating units of the Criminal Police and Investigation Service:
  - Unit for Organized Crime
  - Unit for Corruption and Financial Criminality
- National Drug Headquarters of the Criminal Police and Investigation Service
- Unit for Special Operations of the Criminal Police and Investigation Service - cover IDs, undercover cops, fake money transfers, short-term protection of important crime witnesses (support unit, no investigation)
- Unit for Intelligence Gathering of the Criminal Police and Investigation Service - wiretapping, personal surveillance, etc. (support unit, no investigation)
- Office of Documentation and Investigation of Crime of Communism of the Criminal Police and Investigation Service
- Explosive Ordnance Disposal Service
- Directorate of Alien and Border Police Service
- Unit for Protection of the President of the Czech Republic
- Unit for Protection of constitutional office holders
- Police Education and Service Training Unit
- Rapid Response Unit

=== Regional jurisdiction ===
There are 14 regional headquarters, with jurisdictions covering the regions of the Czech Republic.

Police officers serving under regional HQs are usually organized in the following sections:

- Public Order Police Service (Služba pořádkové policie) - general and largest, most versatile, police officers on general patrolling duty serving at local and district police stations, most usually first responders. Squad cars usually carry two officers, apart from pistols usually with at least one select-fire gun stored in car's rear seats or trunk.
  - Public Order Units - perform specific tasks in the area of protecting people and property, special equipment and training, most often dispatched in large numbers (riot gear for crowd control, assault rifles for active shooter engagement, assisting criminal police, etc.). Squad minivans usually with seven heavily armed policemen.
  - Intervention Units - regional SWAT teams (8 teams covering 14 regions). Mainly for assisting criminal police with arresting dangerous offenders who have committed extremely serious crimes or to perform preliminary measures against terrorists, kidnappers or hijackers. They may be even assigned tasks related to the protection of buildings or the transport of dangerous substances, objects or valuables. Apart from cars equipped also with transport helicopters.
  - First Response Patrol - these units reinforce the public order service units on patrolling duty. Squad cars usually with two or three policemen armed either with Heckler & Koch G36, MP5 or MP7. The official target is to have enough such patrols in service so that at least one squad car with heavily armed and active-attacker response drilled officers can reach any place within 10 minutes.
  - Waterway Units - assigned duties at waterway stations established at major waterways. They control compliance with navigation rules and the Water Act, maintain public order on waterways and bodies of water, help rescue drowning people and clearing up after floods and other natural disasters.
  - Police Divers - assigned not only to waterway stations but also to intervention and rapid deployment units.
  - Railway Units - in train stations of major railway hubs, also operate in trains (catching thieves, looters)
- Cynology Service - training of dogs and dog handlers, about 800 dogs are in active service with the Czech Police (K9 officers themselves are part of the above-mentioned units)
- Hippology Service - training of horses and mounted policemen mainly for patrolling in natural reserve areas and for riot duty (mounted policemen themselves are part of the above-mentioned units)
- Traffic Police Service - supervising the safety and flow of road traffic, dealing with traffic accidents and to check whether traffic rules are followed.
- Weapons and Security Material Service - deals with civilian firearms ownership and issuing of gun licenses, business with military equipment, explosives, gun ranges etc.
- Explosive Ordnance Disposal Service - apart from disposing of explosive materials also provides expert opinions in the field of forensic pyrotechnics
- Criminal Police and Investigation Service - second largest service, usually divided into:
  - White Collar Crime Division (Operative Search, Investigation) - economical, tax, currency related crime
    - Usually divided into specialized sections (according of size of department)
  - Analytics and Cybercrime Division (analytics for other two divisions, cybercrime)
  - General Crime Division (Operative Search, Investigation) - usually divided into specialized sections (according of size of department):
    - 1st Section - Homicides, violent crimes, suicides
    - 2nd Section - Robberies, extortions/blackmail
    - 3rd Section - Sexual and/or juvenile related crime, rape, prostitution
    - 4th Section - Vehicle thefts
    - 5th Section - Thefts, property related crime
    - 6th Section - Search for people and things
    - 7th Section - Permanent crime scene response unit
    - 8th Section - Drug related crime
    - 9th Section - Extremism, racially motivated crime, hooligans
  - Forensic Laboratories and Expertise Service (OKTE)
  - Operative Documentation Division
  - Technical Security Division

== Selection process ==
Anyone who wants to become a police officer must undergo a selection process. The selection procedure usually lasts 3 months. During the procedure, the applicant must undergo a psychological examination, a physical fitness test, a medical examination and other personnel procedures. The applicant must be of legal age and of criminal record.

=== Conditions for admission ===
1. citizenship of the Czech Republic
2. age over 18 years
3. full legal capacity
4. integrity
5. secondary education and higher
6. physical, health and personal fitness to perform the service*
7. is not a member of a political party or political movement
8. does not carry out a trade or other gainful activity and is not a member of the management or control bodies of legal entities that carry out business activities

==== Psychological examination ====
The psychological examination is focused on determining personal prerequisites for the performance of the service. If the applicant does not meet the conditions, he will be able to take the examination again in 2 years at the earliest.

==== Physical fitness test ====
The physical fitness test consists of four physical tests.

1. Shuttle run
2. 1000 meter run
3. Celometric test
4. Cranks

==== Medical examination ====
Assesses the applicant's medical fitness.

== Equipment ==
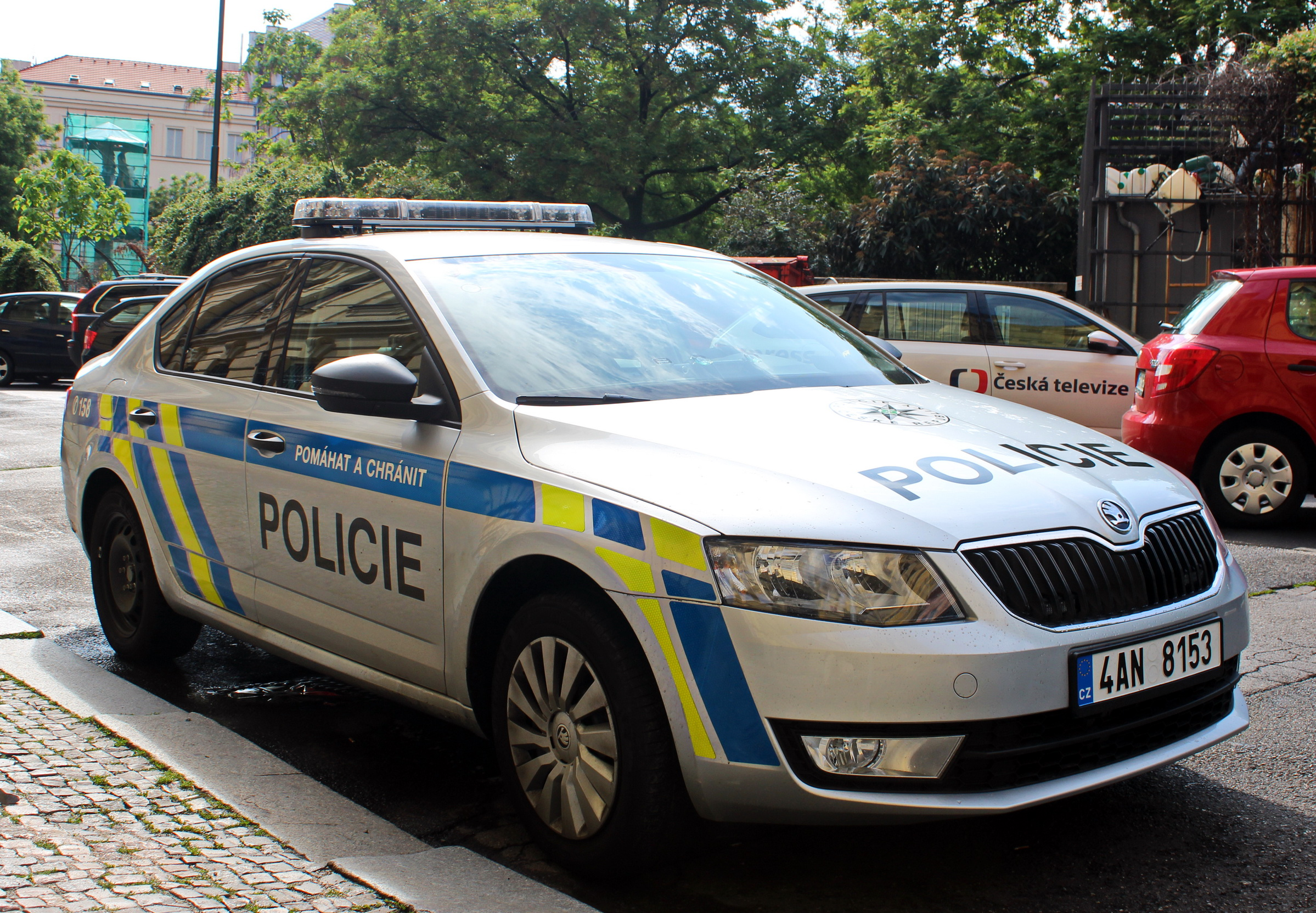
Škoda Octavia Police 2016

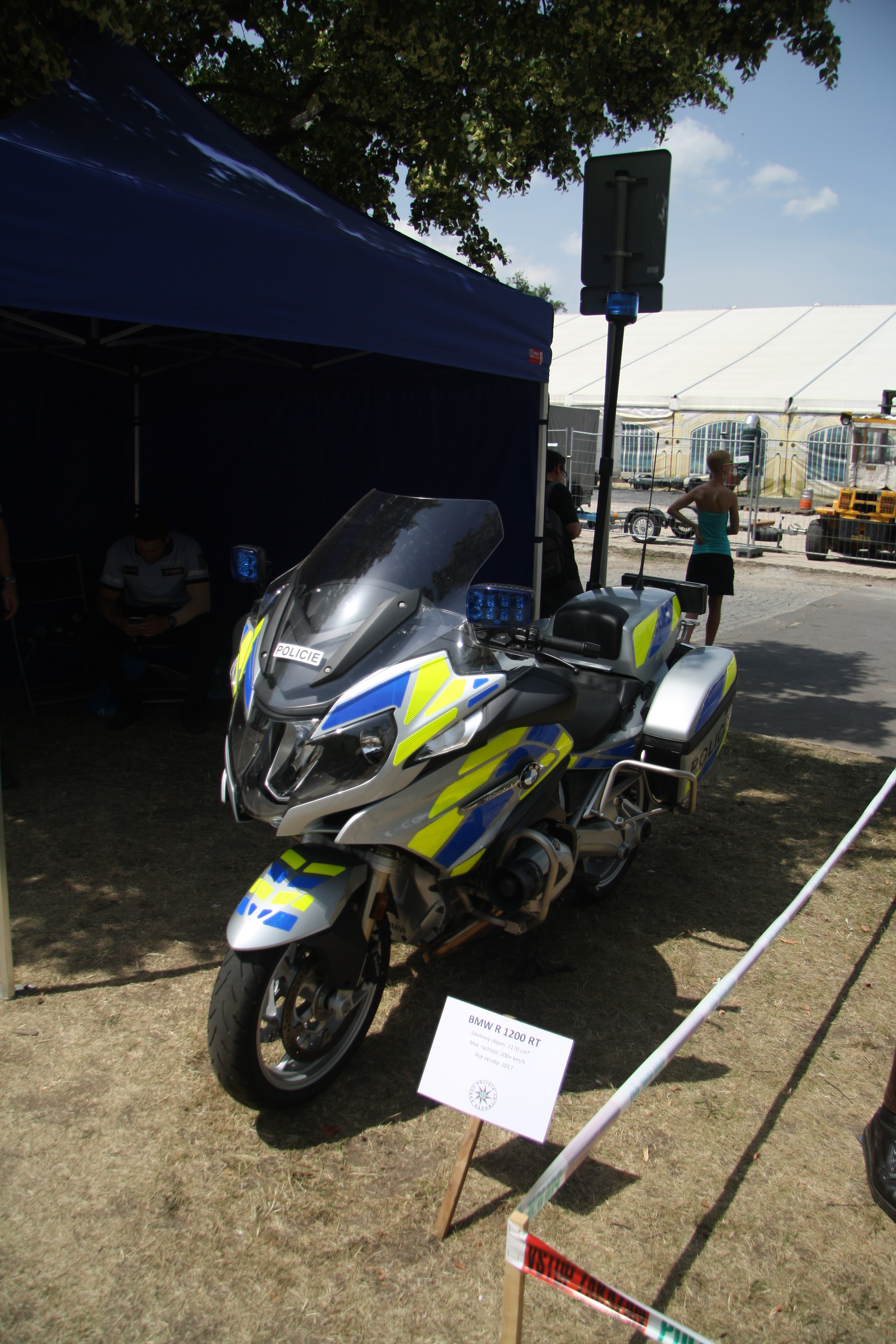
Police BMW 1250 RT

As of 2011, the Police of the Czech Republic employs about 41,000 officers, with a ratio of about 45 officers per 10,000 population. Of these, about 3,500 are traffic-police officers.

=== Transport ===
==== Cars and motorcycles ====
- Typical patrol cars:
  - Škoda Octavia 1.8 (118 kW, 132 kW) & 2.0 (140 kW)
  - Škoda Kodiaq 2.0 (140 kW, 180 kW, 192 kW)
  - Škoda Scala 1.5 (110 kW)
  - Hyundai Tucson 1.6 (130 kW)
  - Hyundai Ioniq Electric (100 kW, 38.3 kWh battery)
  - Hyundai Kona Electric (150 kW, 64 kWh battery)
- Typical offroad patrol cars:
  - Škoda Yeti
  - Volkswagen Amarok
  - Ford Ranger
  - Land Rover Discovery
  - Toyota Land Cruiser
- Typical traffic police vehicles:
  - Škoda Superb 2.0 (206 kW) (unmarked & marked)
  - Volkswagen Passat VR6 3.6 (221 kW) (unmarked)
  - BMW 540i xDrive Touring (245 kW) (unmarked & marked)
  - Ferrari F 142–458 Italia (416 kW) (marked, originally confiscated as proceeds of criminal activity)
  - VW Transporter (marked)
  - BMW Motorcycles (800 and 1250 ccm) (marked)
- Other:
  - Various unmarked cars for general duty (usually Škoda models).
  - Marked and unmarked Audi A6/A8 and BMW 7 for the department of protective service.
  - Various unmarked cars seized from criminals (Porsche, etc).
  - VW Transporter T6 and T6.1 as minivans, mobile offices
  - VW Crafter, Ford Transit, Mercedes-Benz Sprinter as minivans, vans
  - Tatra trucks for special purposes
  - Iveco buses
  - BRDM-2

==== Helicopters ====
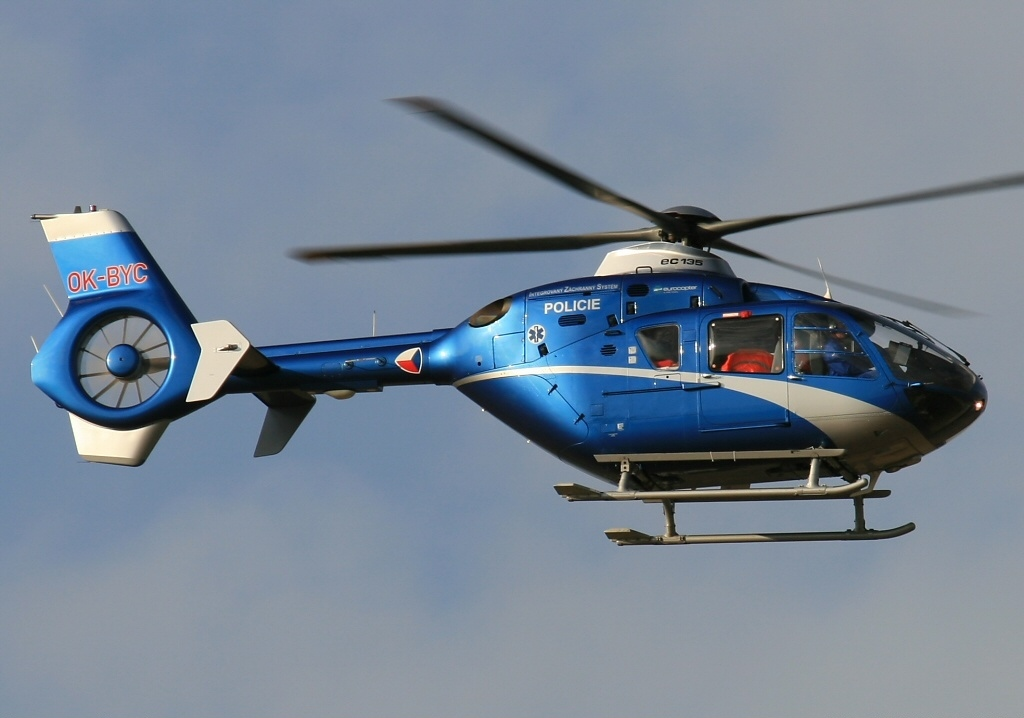
Eurocopter EC135

Aircraft	Origin	Role	Versions	Registration	Number
Bell 412	United States	VIP transport, transport of material, rescue operations, policing	Bell 412 HP	OK-BYN; OK-BYQ	2
Bell 412	United States	Policing	Bell 412 EP	OK-BYP; OK-BYR; OK-BYS	3
Bell 412	United States	Policing	Bell 412 EPI	OK-BYT	1
Eurocopter EC135	European Union	Policing, air rescue service	EC 135 T2, EC 135 T2+	OK-BYA; OK-BYB; OK-BYC; OK-BYD; OK-BYE; OK-BYF; OK-BYG; OK-BYH	8

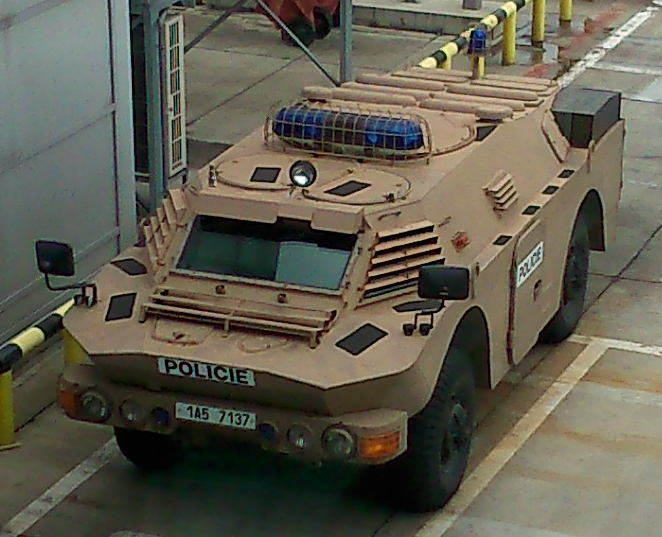
Armoured police vehicle in Prague Airport

==== Watercraft ====
2 motorboats Marine 15Y on the Elbe river in Ústí nad Labem Region, since 2006. Since 2016, a new cabin boat was delivered.

At Slapy Reservoir in the Vltava river, the 15 years old police boat was replaced in 2015 with 2 new boats. In 2015, 16 new police boats (6× cabin boats Tinnsilver 870-Cabin and 10× low-draft boats Alunautic LC 7,50) were delivered, 5 of them to Central Bohemian Region (3 cabin boats and 2 low-draft boats). Other of the police boats were delivered to Orlík Reservoir on the Vltava, to Elbe in Nymburk, and other to South Bohemian Region, Hradec Králové Region and Pardubice Region. River departments of police are in Slapy Reservoir and Prague on the Vltava and in Ústí nad Labem and Nymburk on the Elbe, other boats are used by local police departments on Lipno Reservoir, Orlík Reservoir, Nové Mlýny Reservoir and others.

The Prague river department of the police had in 2004 two cabin boats MB 075 produced in GDR, and planned to replace their Russian ZiL engines with Volvo Penta engines. Other watercraft was 5-meter ship Mayer with a Volvo Penta engine, 6-meter SeeStar Patrol boat with Volvo Penta engine, 4-meter Ryds 500 GTS boat, two rubber boats: 5-meter Bombard with Mercury 25 engine and 4-meter Quick Silver with Johnson 10 engine. In Prague, also the Municipal Police has their watercraft.

=== Firearms ===
The following firearms are used by the Police of the Czech Republic:

Weapon	Origin	Type	Notes	References
Colt Python	USA	Revolver	In reserve	
CZ 75 PCR Compact	Czech Republic	Semi-automatic pistol	In use	
CZ 75 SP-01	Czech Republic	Semi-automatic pistol	In use	
CZ 75 P-01	Czech Republic	Semi-automatic pistol	In use	
CZ 2075 RAMI	Czech Republic	Semi-automatic pistol	In use	
CZ P-07	Czech Republic	Semi-automatic pistol	In use	
CZ 97B	Czech Republic	Semi-automatic pistol	In use	
CZ P-10 C	Czech Republic	Semi-automatic pistol	In use	
Glock 17	Austria	Semi-automatic pistol	In use	
Glock 19	Austria	Semi-automatic pistol	In use	
Glock 26	Austria	Semi-automatic pistol	In use	
Glock 47	Austria	Semi-automatic pistol	In use	
Škorpion vz. 61	Czechoslovakia	Submachine gun	In reserve	
Heckler & Koch MP5	Germany	Submachine gun	Most commonly used	
Heckler & Koch UMP	Germany	Submachine gun		
Heckler & Koch MP7A1	Germany	Submachine gun		
CZ Scorpion Evo 3	Czech Republic	Submachine gun	In limited use	
Steyr AUG Carbine 9x19	Austria	Submachine gun		
Benelli M3	Italy	Shotgun		
Fabarm SDASS Tactical	Italy	Shotgun		
Sa vz. 58	Czechoslovakia	Assault rifle	In reserve	
Heckler & Koch G36	Germany	Assault rifle	Most commonly used	
Heckler & Koch 416	Germany	Assault rifle		
CZ 700	Czechoslovakia	Sniper rifle	Phased out	
Heckler & Koch HK417	Germany	Sniper rifle		
Accuracy International Arctic Warfare	UK	Sniper rifle		
Sako TRG	Finland	Sniper rifle		
SIG Sauer SSG 3000	Switzerland	Sniper rifle		
Heckler & Koch HK69A1	Germany	Grenade launcher		
Pepperball	France	Grenade launcher		
vz. 44/67	Czechoslovakia	Flare gun		

== See also ==
- Band of the Castle Guards and the Police of the Czech Republic
- Law enforcement in the Czech Republic
- Public Security (Czechoslovakia)
