= Horní Planá =

- Town
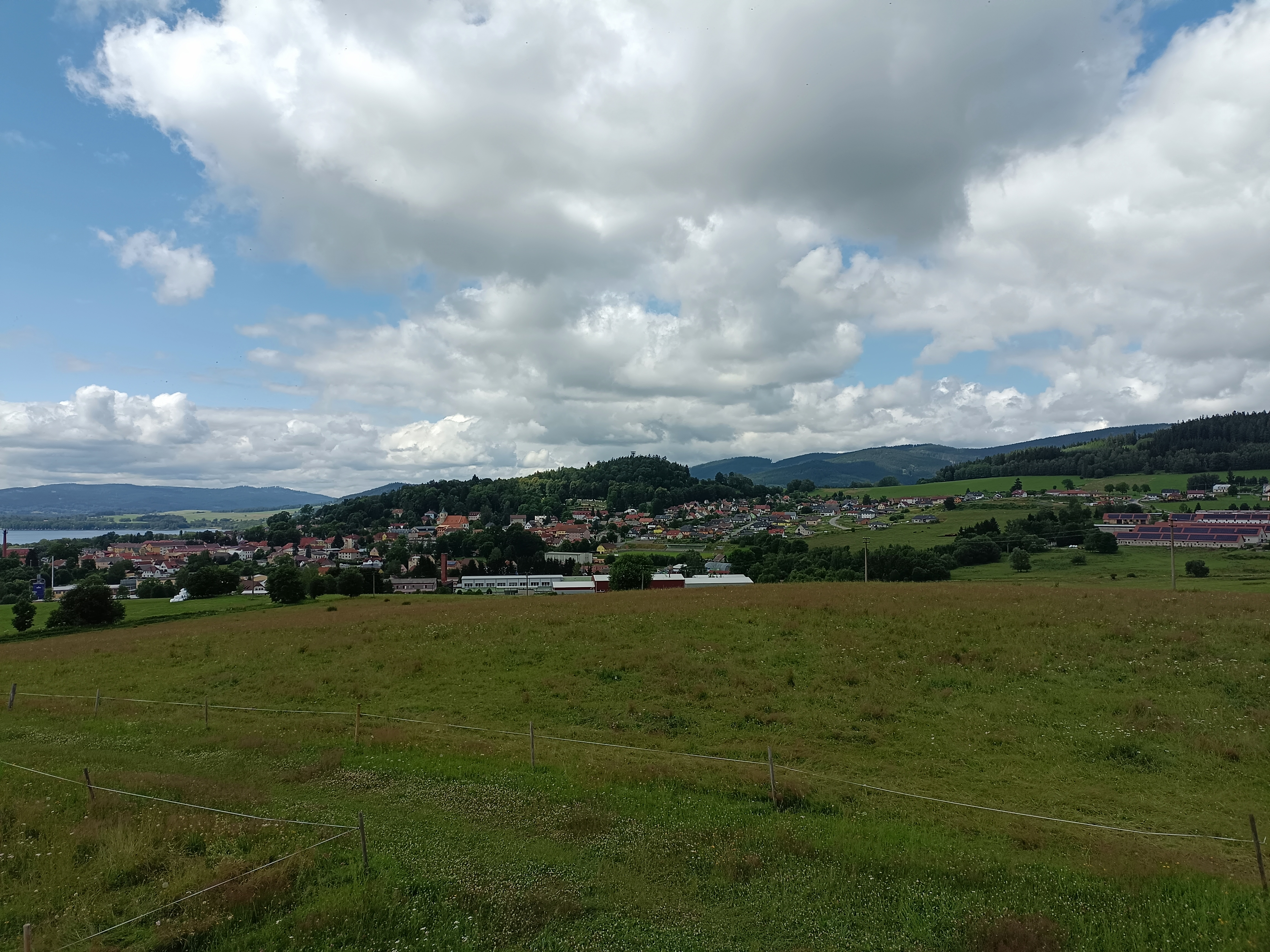
- General view of the town

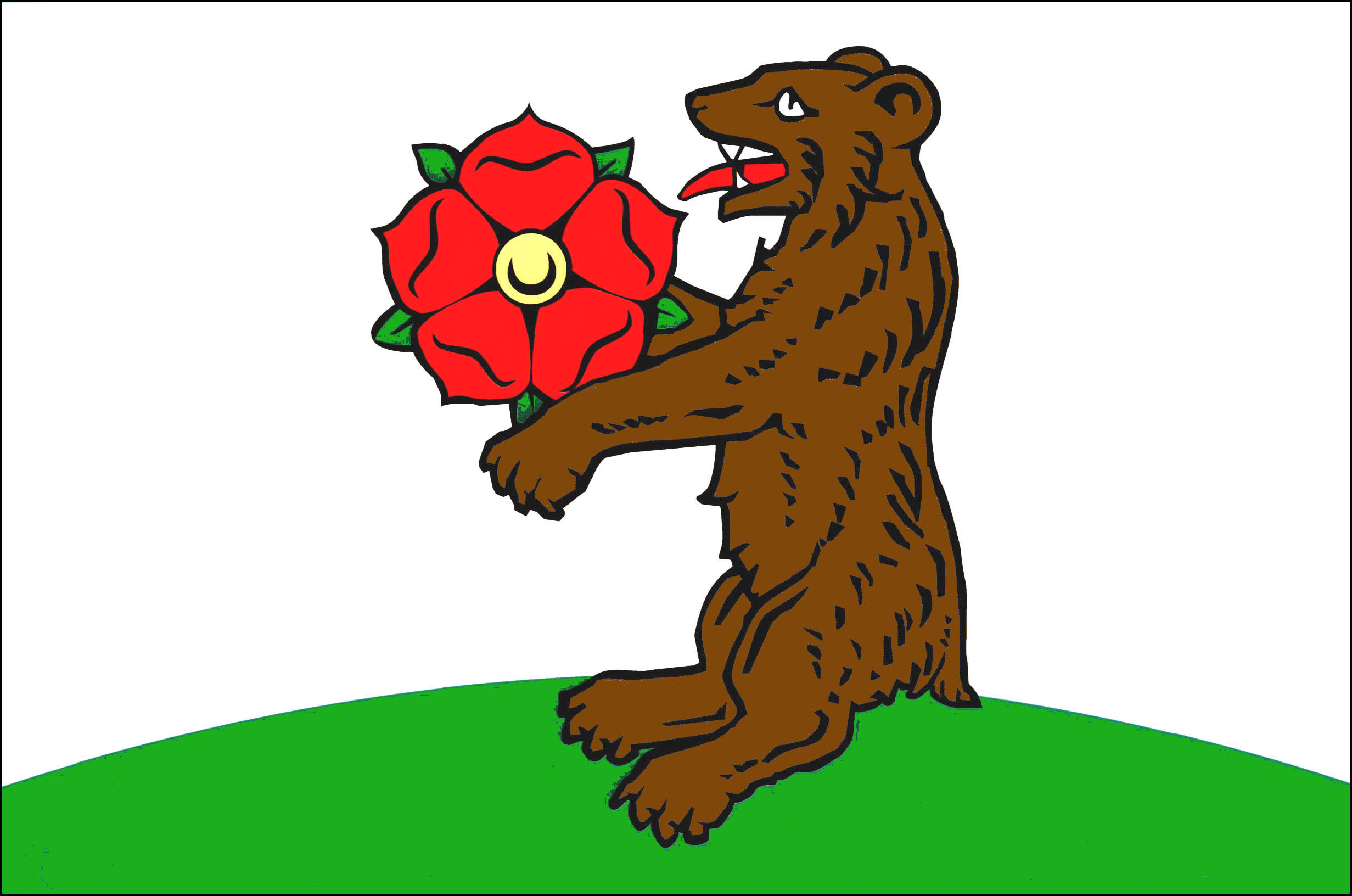
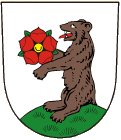
- Flag Coat of arms

- Location in the Czech Republic
- Coordinates: 48°46′3″N 14°1′57″E
- Country: Czech Republic
- Region: South Bohemian
- District: Český Krumlov
- First mentioned: 1332

Government
  - Mayor: Petr Šimák

Area
  - Total: 127.18 km^{2} (49.10 sq mi)
- Elevation: 776 m (2,546 ft)

Population (2026-01-01)
  - Total: 1,933
  - Density: 15.20/km^{2} (39.37/sq mi)
- Time zone: UTC+1 (CET)
  - Summer (DST): UTC+2 (CEST)
- Postal code: 382 26
- Website: www.horniplana.cz

Horní Planá (Czech pronunciation: [ˈɦorɲiː ˈplanaː]; German: Oberplan) is a town in Český Krumlov District in the South Bohemian Region of the Czech Republic. It has about 1,900 inhabitants.

== Administrative division ==
Horní Planá consists of eight municipal parts (in brackets population according to the 2021 census):

- Horní Planá (1,652)
- Bližší Lhota (35)
- Hodňov (62)
- Hory (4)
- Hůrka (143)
- Olšina (18)
- Pernek (81)
- Žlábek (14)

== Etymology ==
The Czech word planá meant 'barren', but it also denoted a wide, open landscape. At the end of the 16th century, the name Horní Planá ('upper Planá') first appeared. The historic German name of the town appeared in the forms Plan, Ober Plan and Oberplan. In 1921, the town returned to its Czech name Horní Planá.

== Geography ==
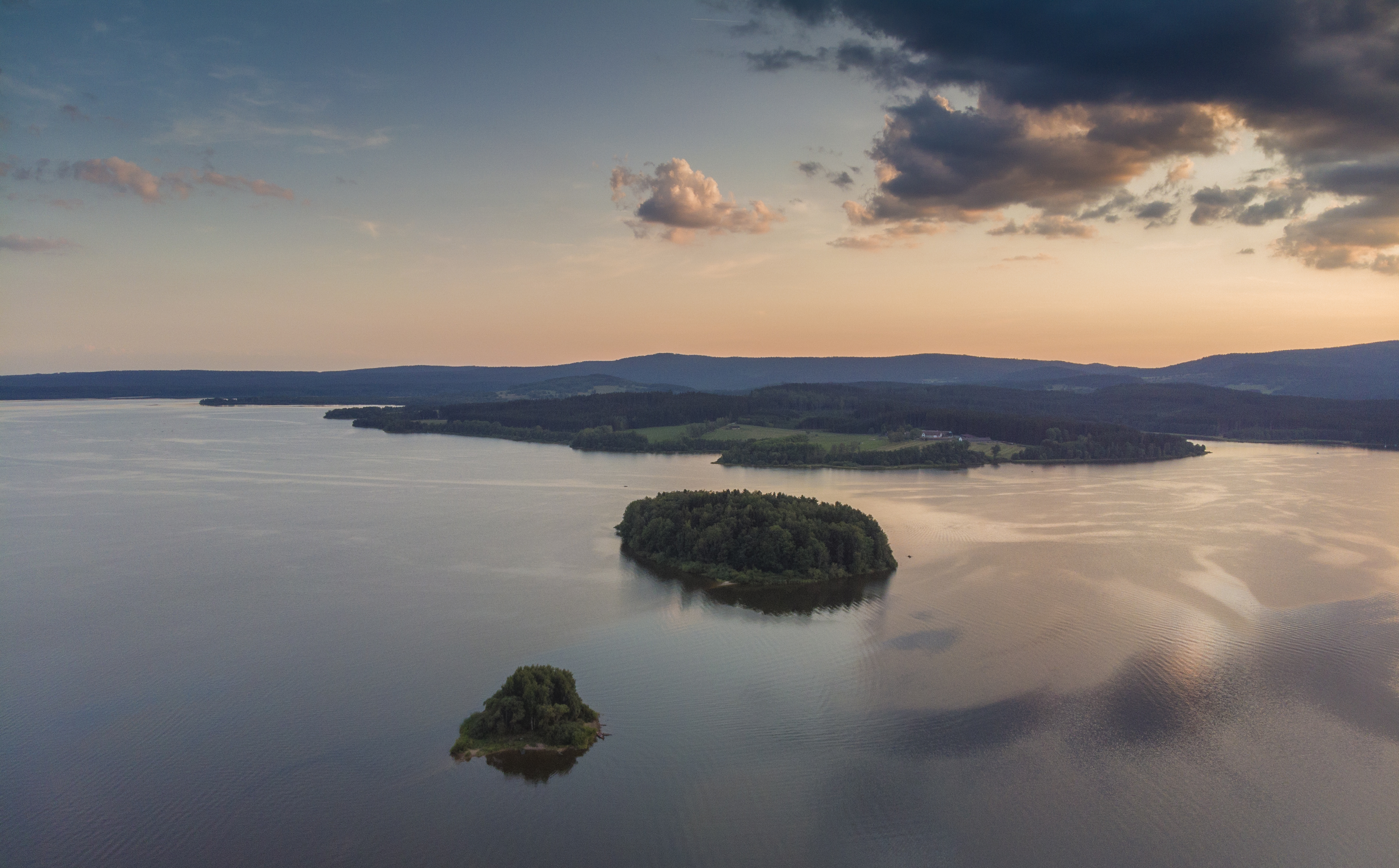
Tajvan, the largest island of the Lipno Reservoir

Horní Planá lies about 21 kilometres (13 mi) southwest of Český Krumlov and 38 km (24 mi) southwest of České Budějovice. It lies on the border with Austria.

Horní Planá is situated in the Bohemian Forest on the southeastern rim of the Šumava National Park, in the Šumava Protected Landscape Area. The highest point of Horní Planá and of the entire Český Krumlov District is a point on the top of the mountain Smrčina with an altitude of 1,333 m (4,373 ft).

Horní Planá is located on the northern shore of the Lipno Reservoir, south of the Boletice Military Training Area. Tajvan, the largest island of the reservoir, is located in the territory of Horní Planá. Beyond the Lipno Reservoir, a densely forested area with several abandoned villages stretches up to the Vltava–Danube drainage divide (part of the main European Watershed).

== History ==
Horní Planá was founded by monks from the Zlatá Koruna Monastery in the first half of the 14th century. In 1349, it was promoted to a market town by King Charles IV.

During the Hussite Wars in 1420, it was incorporated into the Český Krumlov estate, then held by the Rosenberg family. The Rosenbergs insignia were adopted in the town's coat of arms. The good location on the trade route from Bohemia to Austria and later the construction of the Schwarzenberg Canal and the railway had a significant influence on the town's development.

Until 1945, the local population predominantly consisted of ethnic Germans. In 1930, they made 98% of the population. In 1938, the town was annexed by Nazi Germany upon the 1938 Munich Agreement and incorporated into the Reichsgau Oberdonau. After World War II, it was restored to Czechoslovakia, while the remaining German-speaking population was expelled.

== Demographics ==
Historical population

Year	Pop.	±%
1869	6,332	—
1880	7,245	+14.4%
1890	7,473	+3.1%
1900	7,830	+4.8%
1910	7,658	−2.2%

Year	Pop.	±%
1921	7,233	−5.5%
1930	6,836	−5.5%
1950	2,473	−63.8%
1961	1,926	−22.1%
1970	1,967	+2.1%

Year	Pop.	±%
1980	2,130	+8.3%
1991	2,302	+8.1%
2001	2,293	−0.4%
2011	2,233	−2.6%
2021	2,009	−10.0%

Source: Censuses

== Transport ==
The I/39 road (the section from Český Krumlov to Volary) runs through the town. The Zadní Zvonková / Schöneben road border crossing is located in the territory of Horní Planá.

Horní Planá is located on the railway line České Budějovice–Nové Údolí. There are four train stations and stops in the municipal territory.

== Sights ==
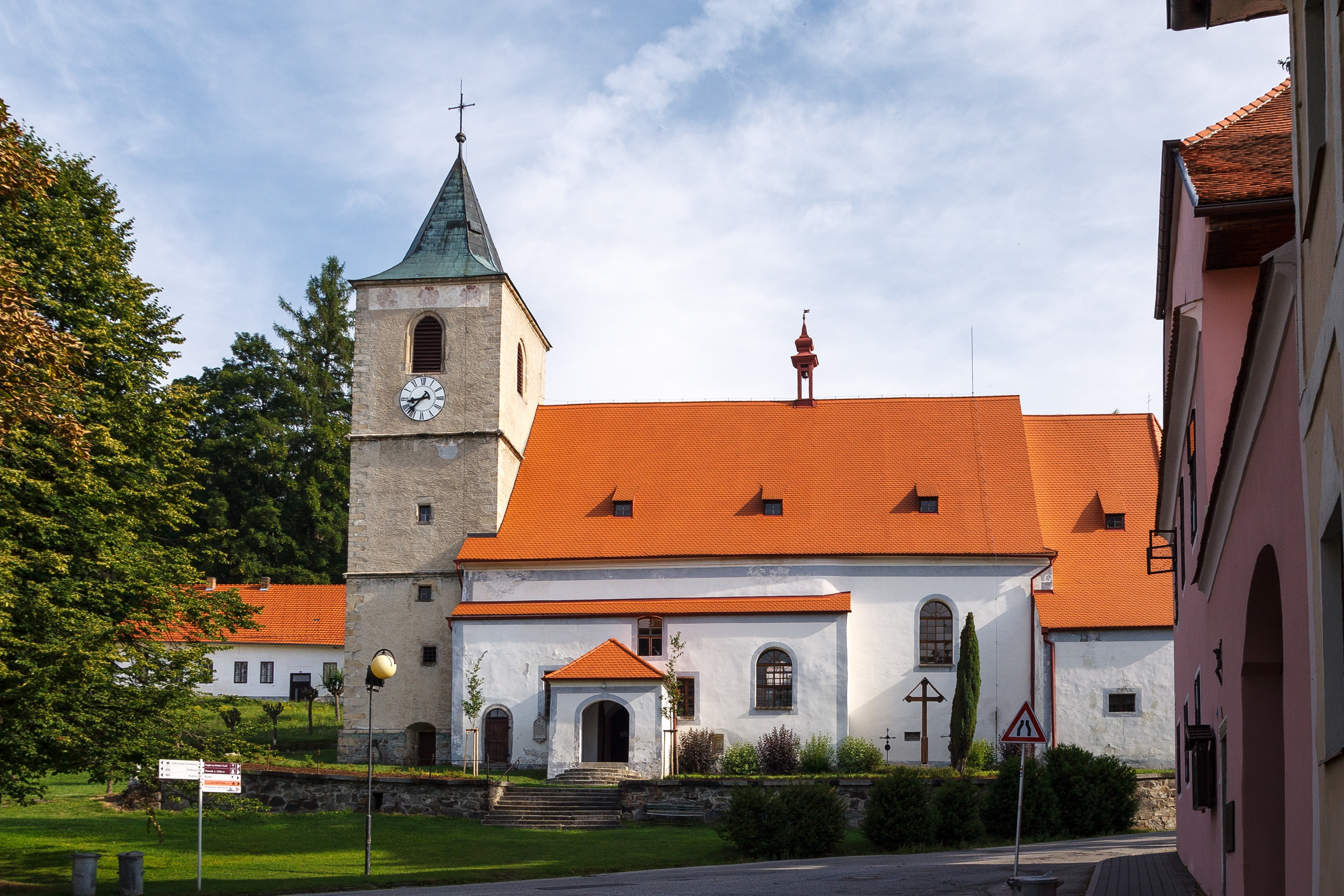
Church of Saint Margaret the Virgin

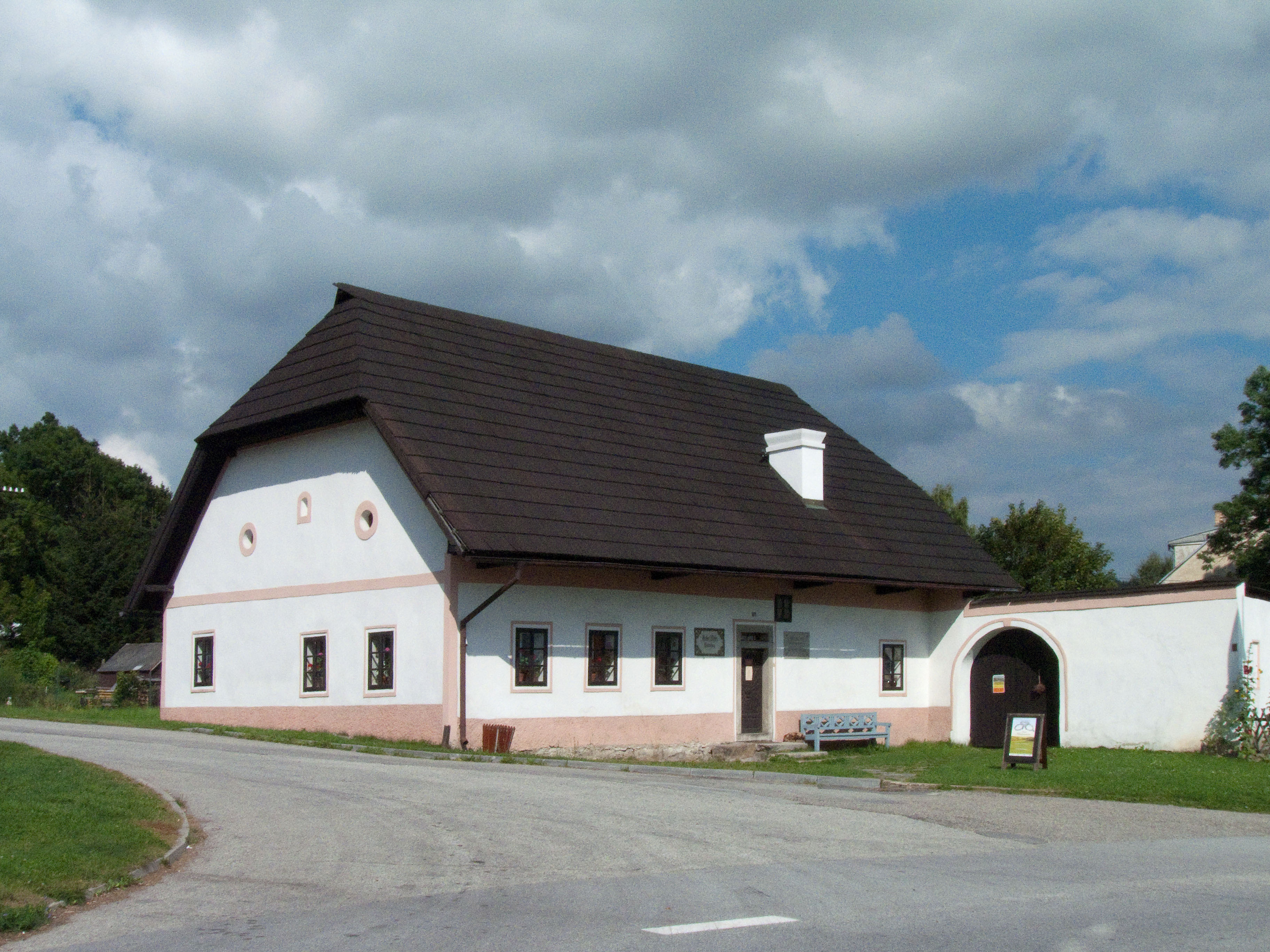
Adalbert Stifter's birthplace

The main landmark of Horní Planá is the Church of Saint Margaret the Virgin. Its existence is first documented in 1374. It was later rebuilt in the Neo-Gothic style and has preserved Renaissance murals, made between 1530 and 1580.

The birth house of Adalbert Stifter now houses a museum dedicated to his life and work. There is also a park named after Stifter with his monument.

A landmark on the town square is the Neo-Baroque town hall from 1896.

== Notable people ==
- Adolf Martin Pleischl (1787–1867), chemist and medical doctor
- Adalbert Stifter (1805–1868), writer, poet and painter
- Leopold Wackarž (1810–1901), Cistercian abbot general
- Johann Evangelist Habert (1833–1896), composer and organist
- Matěj Ryneš (born 2001), footballer

== Twin towns – sister cities ==
Horní Planá is twinned with:

- Ulrichsberg, Austria
