= Female Saint of Dolní Vltavice =

Wooden statue made in Prague

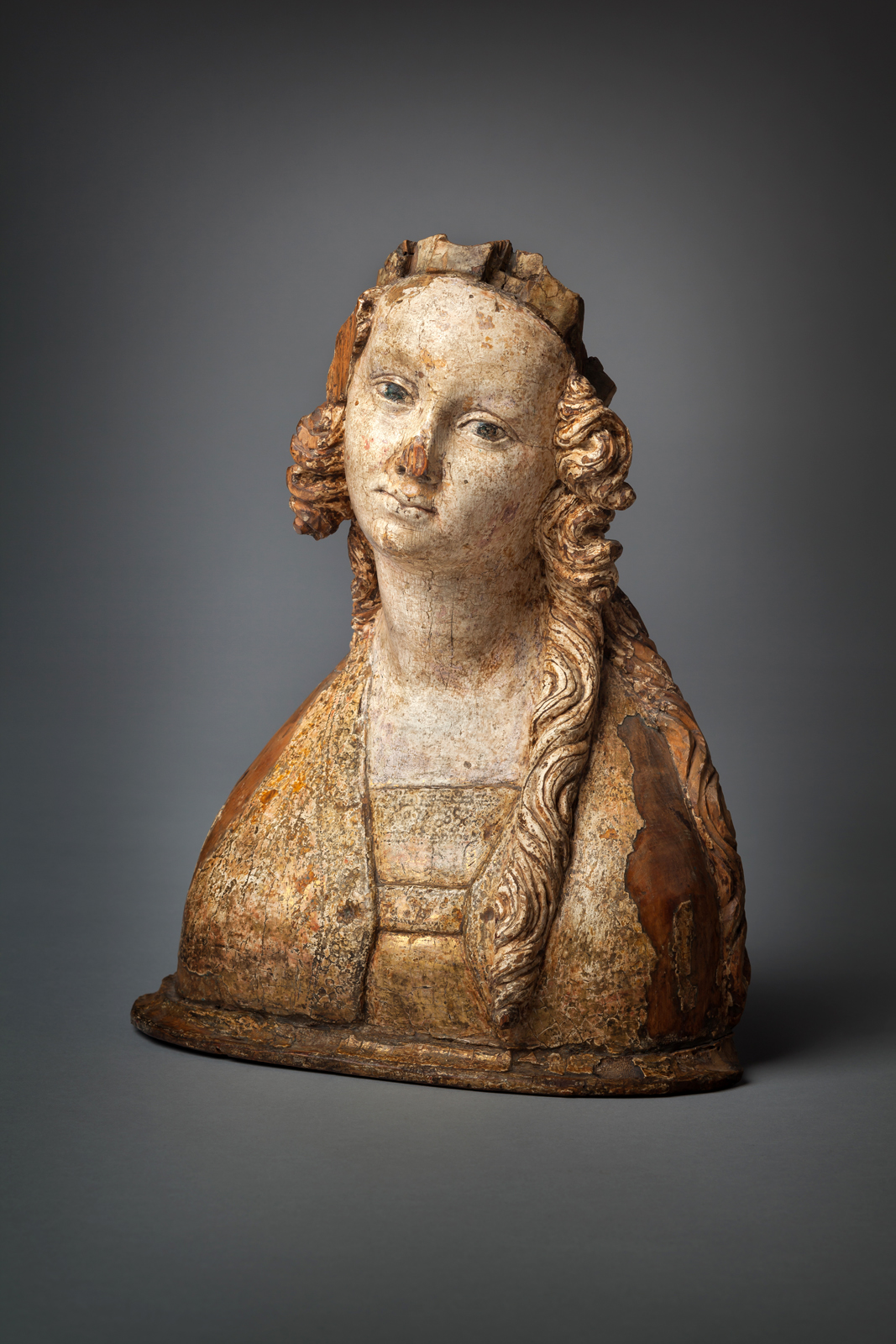
Female Saint of Dolní Vltavice, Aleš South Bohemian Gallery in Hluboká nad Vltavou

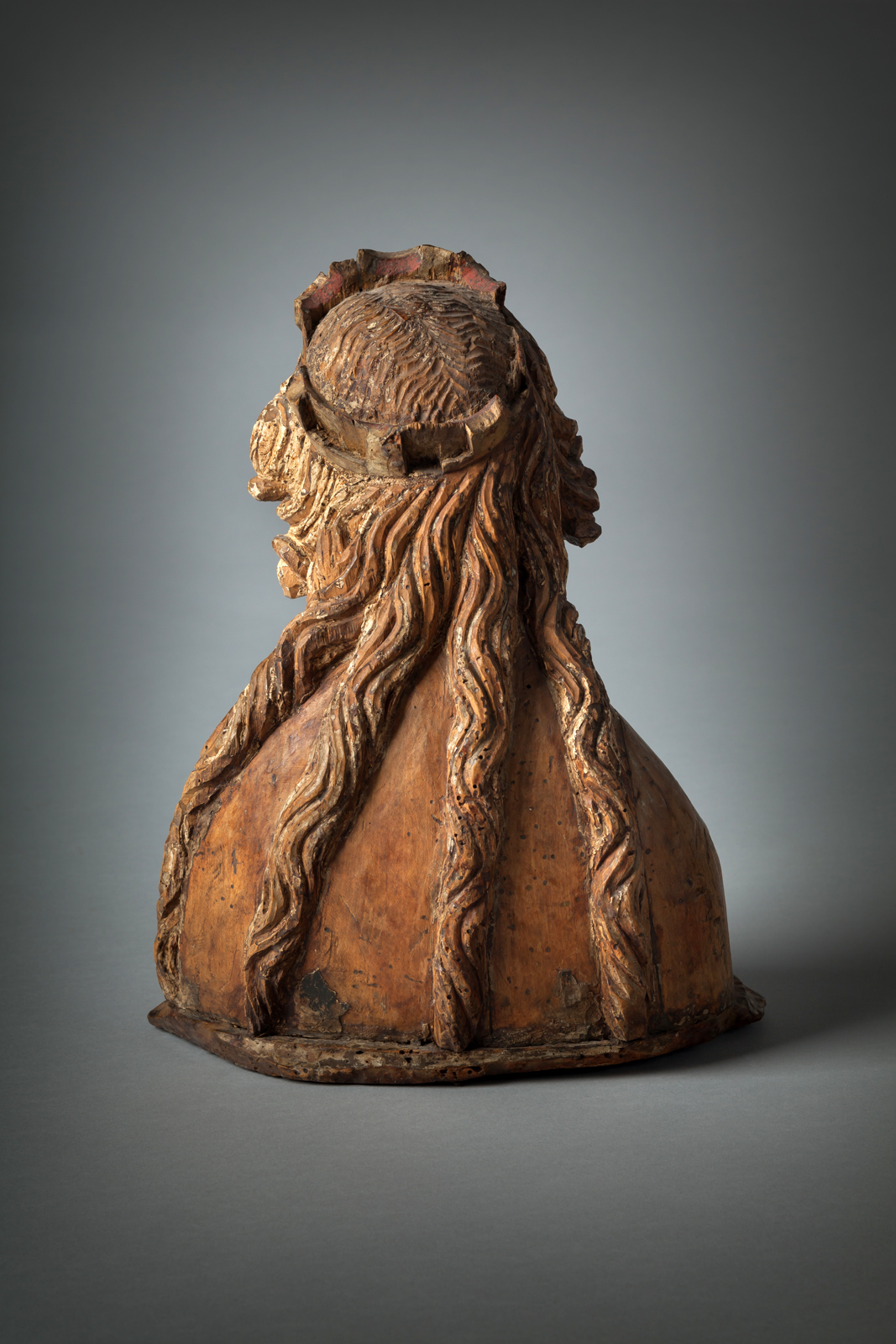
Female Saint of Dolní Vltavice (rear side)

The Female Saint of Dolní Vltavice is a bust of an unknown saint made in a Prague carving workshop between 1380 and 1390. It is on display in the permanent exhibition of the Aleš South Bohemian Gallery in Hluboká nad Vltavou.

== History ==
The statue is said to have come from the church of St. Linhart (founded in 1355) in Dolní Vltavice (Hirschau), which was demolished when the Lipno Reservoir was filled. However, the quality of the carving suggests that it originated in the Zlatá Koruna monastery, which owned the village from the 13th century, or in the nearby Cistercian monastery in Vyšší Brod. In 1929, the bust was purchased from the private estate of J. Starhoň in Český Krumlov by the Municipal Museum in České Budějovice. In 1953 it was transferred to the collections of the Aleš South Bohemian Gallery in Hluboká nad Vltavou.

== Description and classification ==
A fully plastic sculpture made of lime wood on a low oval pedestal, with preserved original polychromy, size 33 x 26 x 16 cm. Part of a lock of hair on the right side and the tip of the nose are missing. Restored by Bohuslav Slánský (1934) and Jiří Tesař (1967).

The bust has narrow vertical shoulders and a low crown on her head. Her long wavy hair is divided into five strands, one of which falls over her left shoulder onto her breast and four of which flow down her back. A flowing cloak is thrown over her dress, fastened in front with a wide ornate belt. The cloak and dress have decorative trim around the neckline. The round and soft face with a dreamy expression is reminiscent of the female figures in the paintings of the Master of the Třeboň Altarpiece and foreshadows the sculptures of what is to be known as the "International Gothic style".

In size and shape, the statue corresponds to the reliquary busts and is believed to have served as their complement on the altar. It is artistically related to another two similar reliquary busts from Dolní Vltavice, purchased in 1934 for the Kunstmuseum Düsseldorf (Stiftung Museum Kunst Palast), and also to the busts of the Parler workshop in the triforium of St. Vitus Cathedral (Wenceslas von Radetz, Anna von Schweidnitz, Elizabeth of Bohemia). As the carved pews in the choir of the cathedral (destroyed in a fire in 1541) also came from Parler's workshop, it can be assumed that the author of the bust may have worked there.

== Sources ==
- Registration sheet, inv. no. P-18, Aleš South Bohemian Gallery in Hluboká nad Vltavou
- Hynek Látal, Petra Lexová, Martin Vaněk, Meziprůzkumy, AJG Collection 1300–2016, No. 6, AJG Hluboká nad Vltavou 2016, ISBN 978-80-87799-52-9
- Roman Lavička, Gothic Art, Aleš South Bohemian Gallery 2008, p. 15, ISBN 978-80-86952-57-4
- Jiří Fajt (ed.), Charles IV, Emperor by the Grace of God. Culture and Art during the Reign of the Luxembourgers 1310–1437, Academia, Prague 2006, ISBN 80-200-1399-7
- Hynek Rulíšek, Gothic Art of South Bohemia, Guide, vol. 3, Alšova jihočeská galerie v Hluboká nad Vltavou 1989, ISBN 80-900057-6-4
- Hynek Rulíšek, Gothic Art in South Bohemia, National Gallery in Prague 1989, pp. 16–17, ISBN 80-7035-013-X
- Anton Legner (ed.), Die Parler und der Schöne Still 1350–1400. Europäische Kunst unter den Luxemburgen, Handbuch zur Ausstellung 2, Schnütgen-Museum, Köln 1978
- Jaroslav Pešina, Jaromír Homolka (ed.), Czech Gothic Art 1350–1420, Academia, Prague 1970
- Albert Kutal, Czech Gothic Sculpture 1350–1450, SNKLU Prague 1962
