= Tajvan =

Island in the Czech Republic

Native name: Tajvan
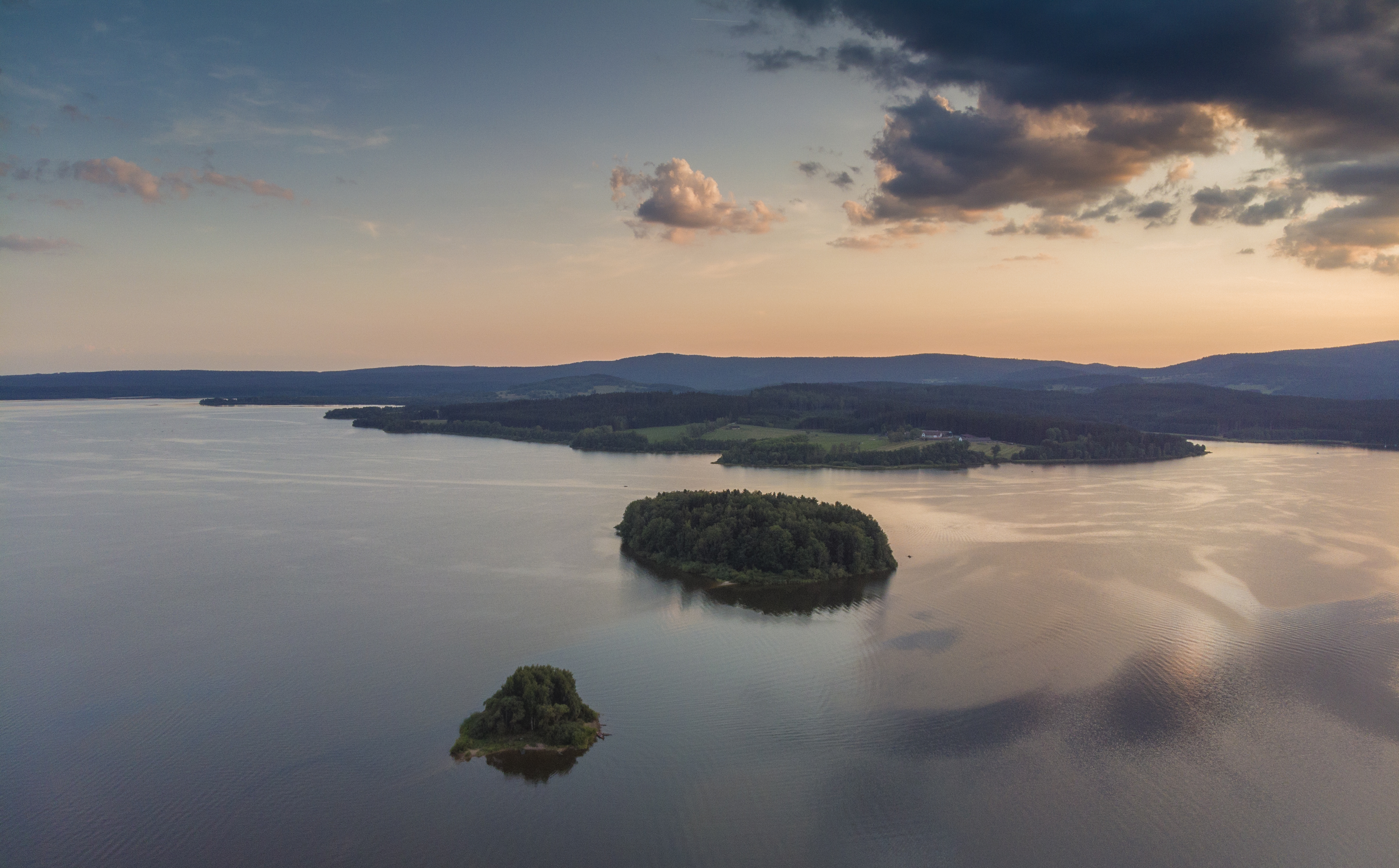
- Interactive map of Tajvan

Geography
- Location: Lipno Reservoir
- Coordinates: 48°44′30″N 14°3′46″E

Administration
- Czech Republic

Tajvan is the largest island on Lipno Reservoir on the Vltava River in the South Bohemian Region of the Czech Republic. It is located in the territory of Horní Planá.

== Geography and nature ==
The highest point of the island reaches an altitude of 737 m. The island is covered with a mixed forest with a predominance of pines and birches. The island is known for the occurrence of waterfowl and rare aquatic fauna.

== Name ==
According to one interpretation, the island was named after a fisherman who was riding a fish on it. Because he had sloping eyes, he was nicknamed the Chinese, so people began to call the island according to the island of Taiwan.

According to another interpretation, cartographers planned to construct the Lipno Reservoir, because the expected nameless island on the shape maps remarkably resembled the shape of the island of Taiwan.
