= Mountain Rescue Service of the Czech Republic =

- Horská služba České republiky

Agency overview
- Formed: 1990
- Preceding agency: Horská služba
- Headquarters: Špindlerův Mlýn, Czech Republic
- Parent agency: Ministry of Regional Development
- Website: www.horskasluzba.cz

The Mountain Rescue Service of the Czech Republic (Czech: Horská služba České republiky, HS ČR) provides nationwide mountain rescue operations and search and rescue operations in difficult terrains in close cooperations with the Air Rescue Service and Police of the Czech Republic. It is a part of the integrated rescue system in the Czech Republic.

== History ==
On 24 March 1913 two skiers died in Krkonoše. Bohumil Hanč participated in a 50 km long ski race and Václav Vrbata, his friend, came to cheer on him. During the race Hanč became exhausted and so Vrbata gave him his jacket to keep him warm. Both of these men died of hypothermia and this day is known as the Day of the Mountain Rescue Service of the Czech Republic.

In virtue of this incident was the Mountain Rescue Service in Krkonoše founded. It happened on 12 May 1935.

Later on, in 1948 was Mountain Rescue Service founded in Jeseníky, the same year also in Šumava, 1949 in Orlické hory, 1951 in Beskydy, 1954 in Jizerské hory and finally 1955 in Krušné hory.

On 1 December 1954 Mountain Rescue Service became one united organisation. All volunteer teams were transferred into this organisation. Regional committees were established to control over its members.

On 21 June 1968 Mountain Rescue Service joined IKAR (International Mountain Rescue Services Federation) and UIAA (Union Internationale des Associations d´Alpinisme).

Since 2004 Mountain Rescue Service is under Ministry of Regional Development.

== Structure ==
As stated before, Mountain Rescue Service operates in 7 districts. These districts are:

- Krkonoše
- Jeseníky
- Šumava
- Orlické hory
- Beskydy
- Jizerské hory
- Krušné hory

Organisation's headquarters is located in Špindlerův Mlýn.

Mountain Rescue Service has two inside organisations: Horská služba ČR, o. p. s. (full-time employees) with its chief Jiří Brožek and volunteer organisation Horská služba ČR, o. s. with its chief Adolf Klepš. These organisations operate as single organisation and people won't see any difference. Full-time employees get usual salary and equipment. Volunteer members work for free and are eligible to get all the clothing and equipment. Physical exams and knowledge are the same for both of organisations. Full-time employees sometimes help in other areas; volunteers are stationed in one area only.

== Tasks and legal status ==
Mountain Rescue Service's main tasks include:

- to organise and carry out rescue and search actions in mountain terrain
- to provide first aid and secure transport of injured people
- to create conditions for safety of visitors of the mountains
- to secure the operation of rescue and reporting stations of the Mountain Rescue Service
- to install and maintain warning and information devices
- to cooperate with the publishing and distribution of preventive-security materials
- to inform the public about weather and snow conditions in the mountains and about the Mountain Rescue Service's measures taken to secure safety in the mountains
- to cooperate with the public administration, nature and environment protection agencies and other authorities and organisations
- to monitor the injury rate, investigate the causes of injuries in the mountains and propose and recommend measures for its reduction
- to carry out patrol service on mountain ridges and ski slopes and emergency services at Mountain Rescue Service stations and houses
- to carry out avalanche observations
- to prepare and train its members and candidates
- to cooperate with other rescue organisations both in the Czech Republic and abroad – TOPR, Slovak Mountain Rescue Service and German Mountain Rescue Service organisations.

Mountain Rescue Service's tasks are stated in the Tourism Act. Members of the Mountain Rescue Service does not have any law enforcement powers. Mountain Rescue Service Act is being worked on.

Mountain Rescue Service operates with a high-quality equipment. ATVs, snowmobiles and jeeps are used for daily duties. Also Mountain Rescue Service has snowcats for difficult rescue operations. Air rescues are conducted with Air Rescue Service or State Police cooperation. Because the organisation is a member of integrated rescue system, they are used during the floods and other incidents. Also the organisation is authorised to use emergency vehicle lighting and sirens. This possibility is used during the emergency responses, search and rescue operations or trainings. Every member and candidate has to be trained to use the emergency lighting and sirens.

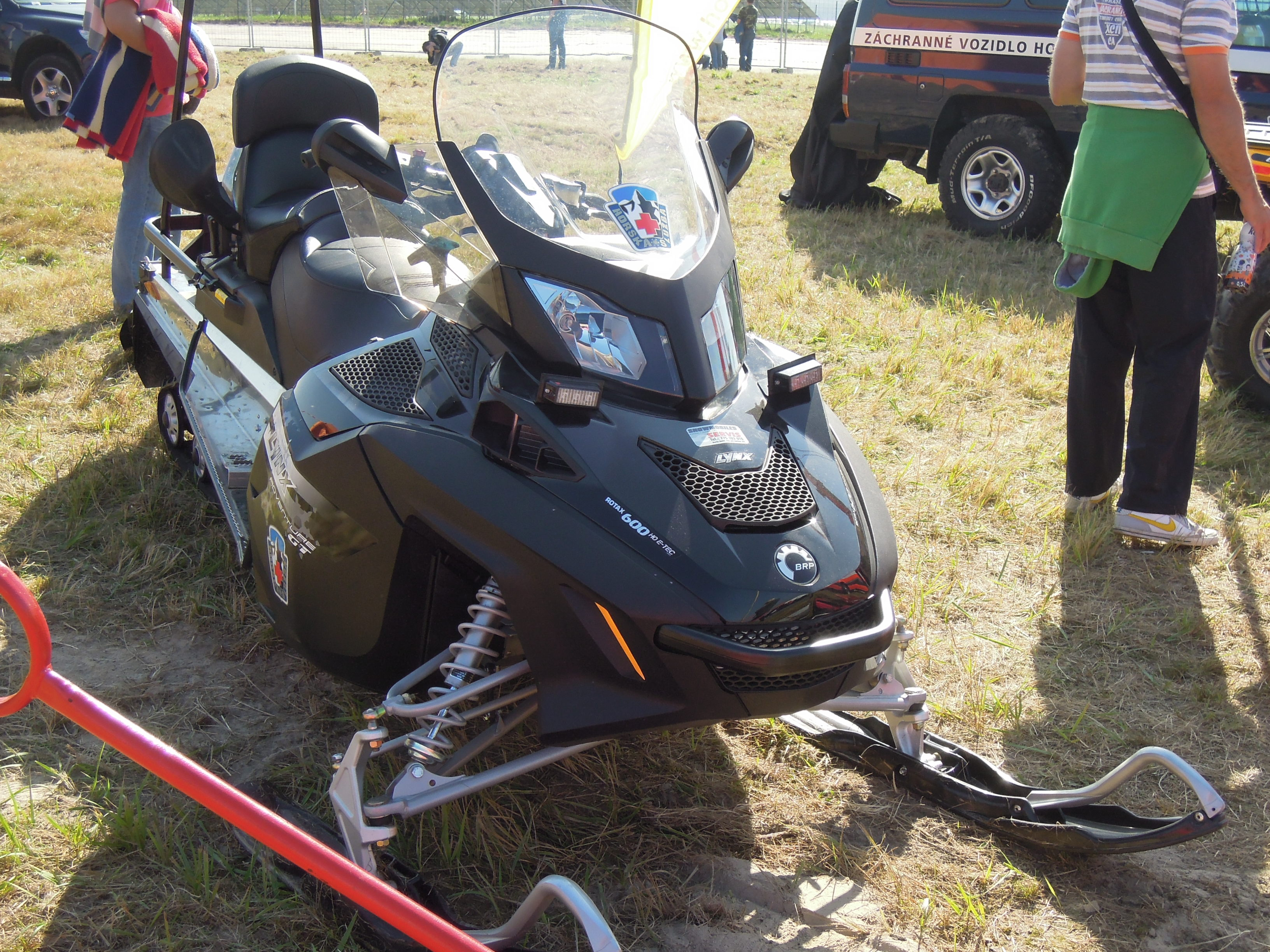
Mountain Rescue Service's snowmobile

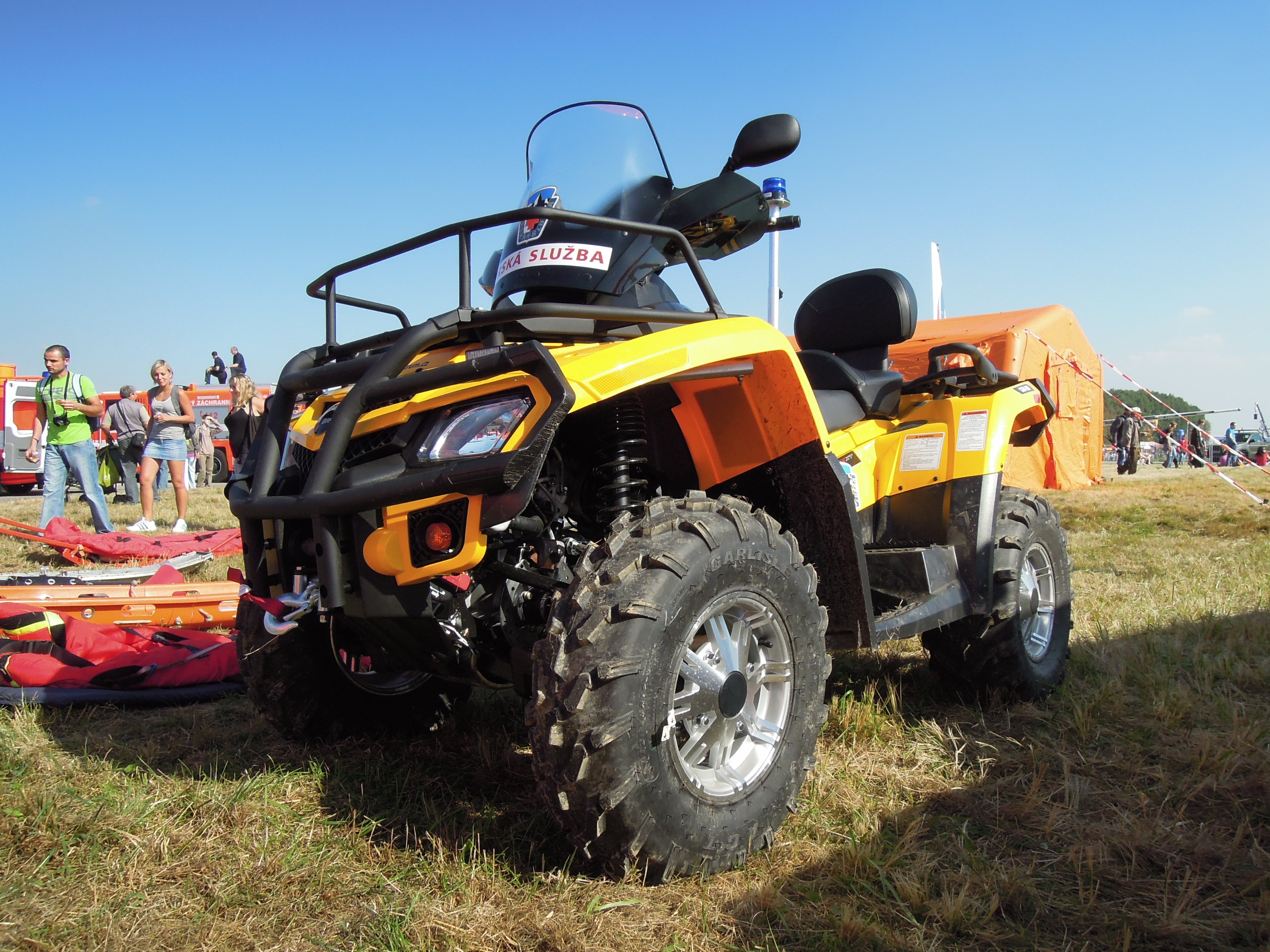
Mountain Rescue Service's ATV

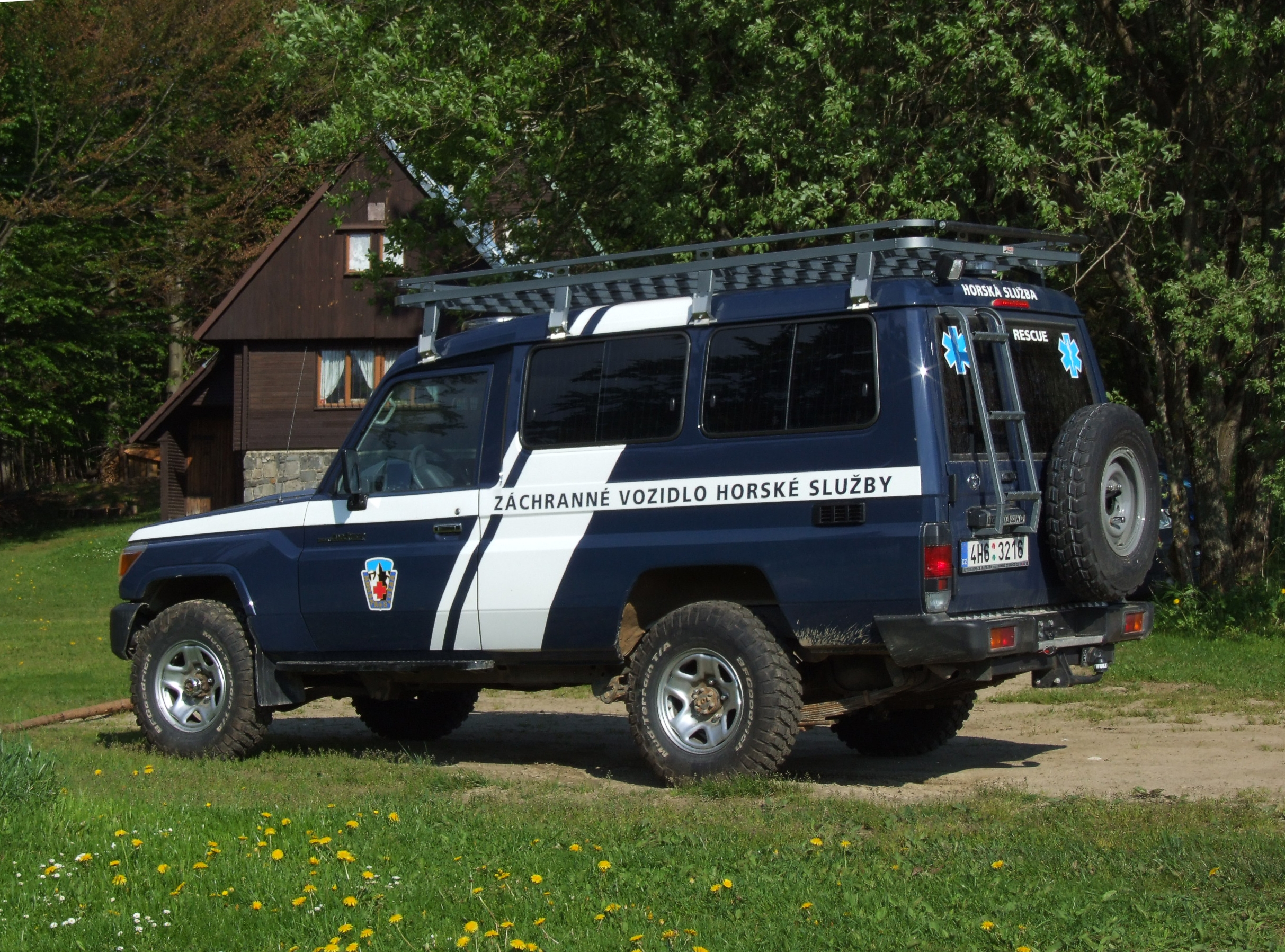
Old Mountain Rescue Service's SUV

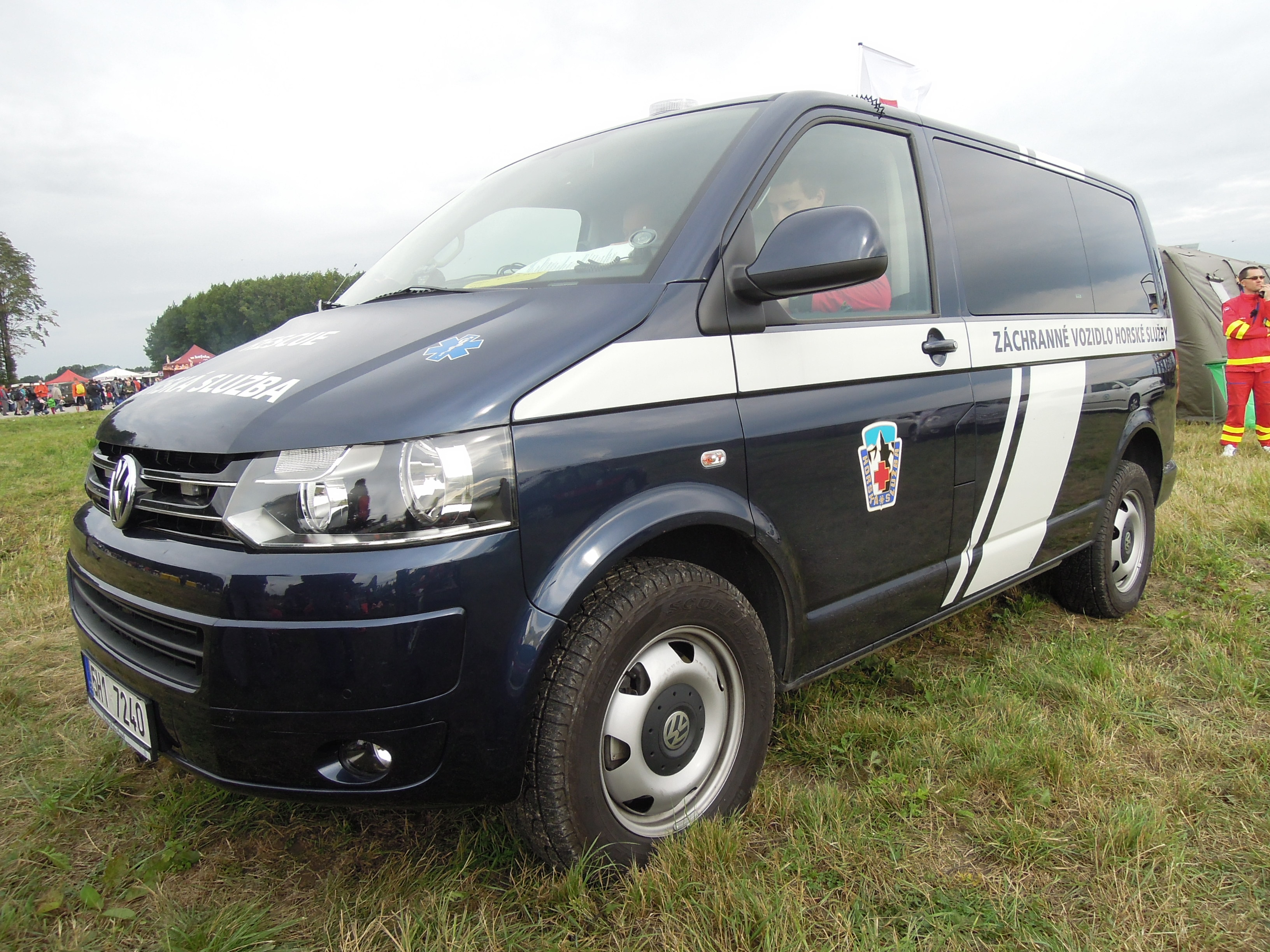
Mountain Rescue Service's VW Transporter T5

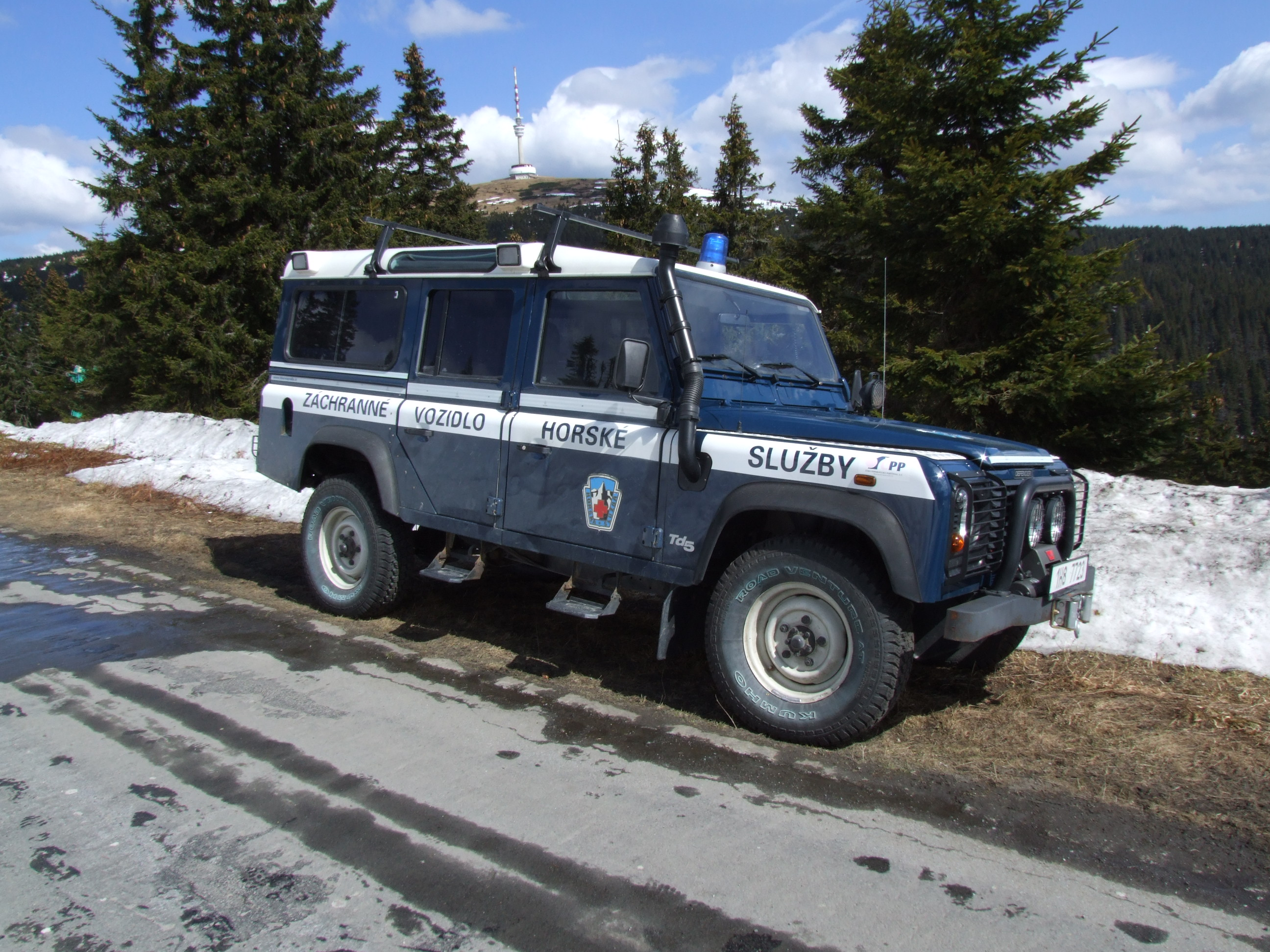
Mountain Rescue Service's Land Rover

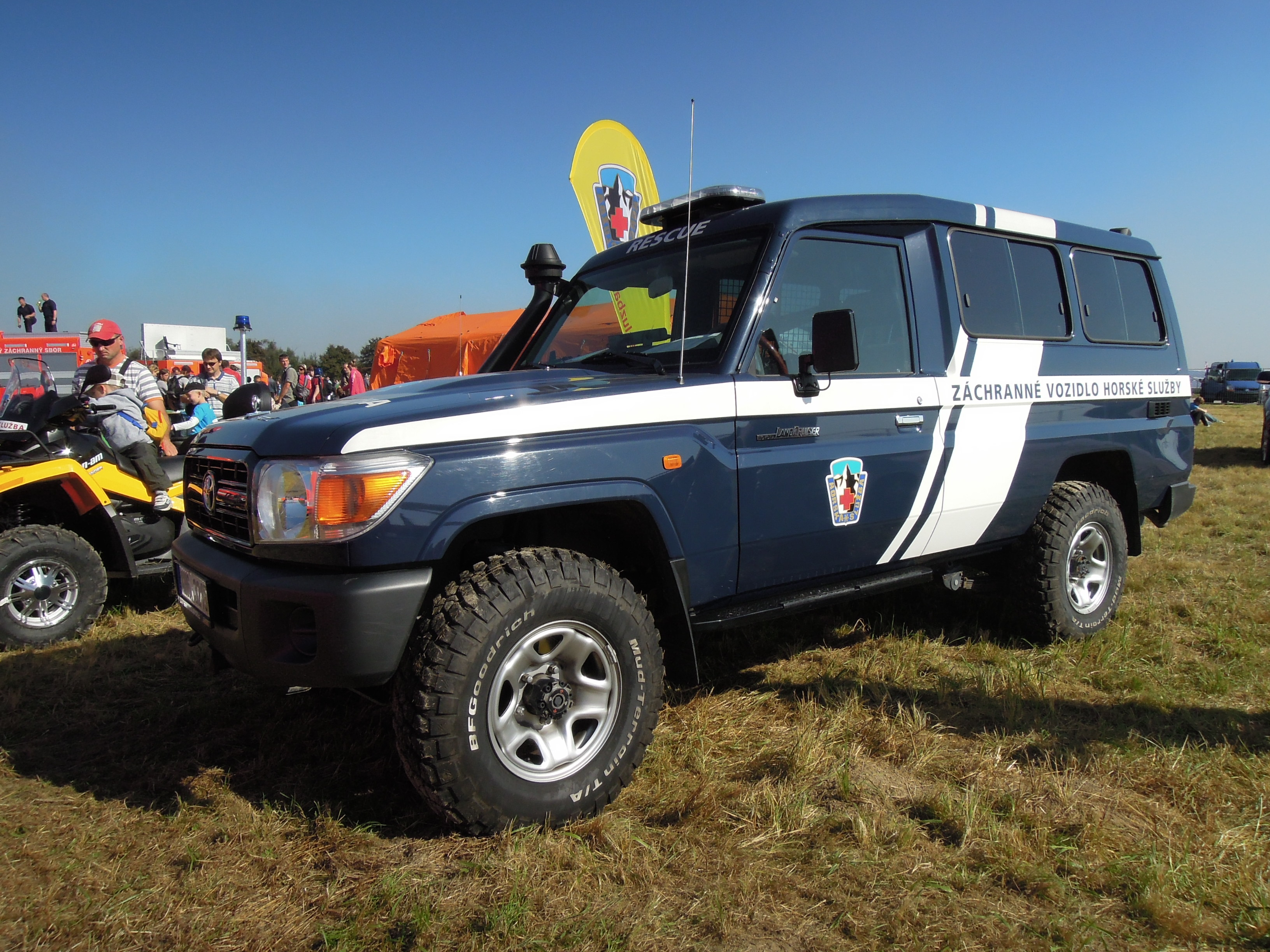
Mountain Rescue Service's Toyota Land Cruiser

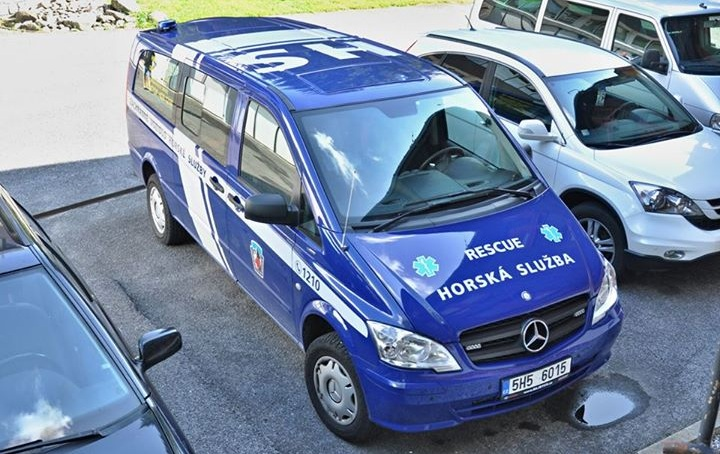
Mountain Rescue Service's Mercedes Vito

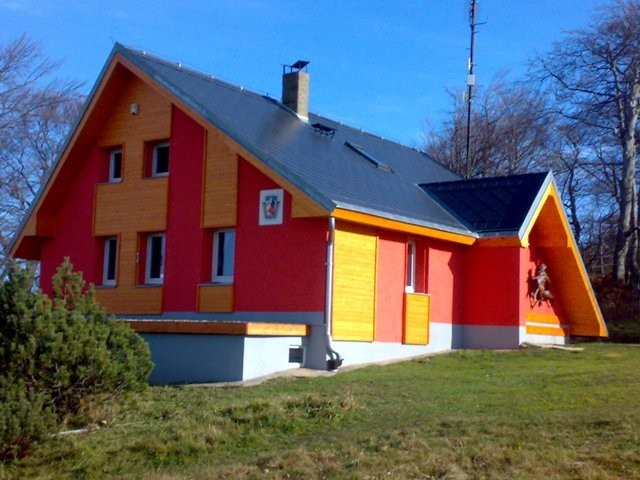
Mountain Rescue Service station on the Bouřňák

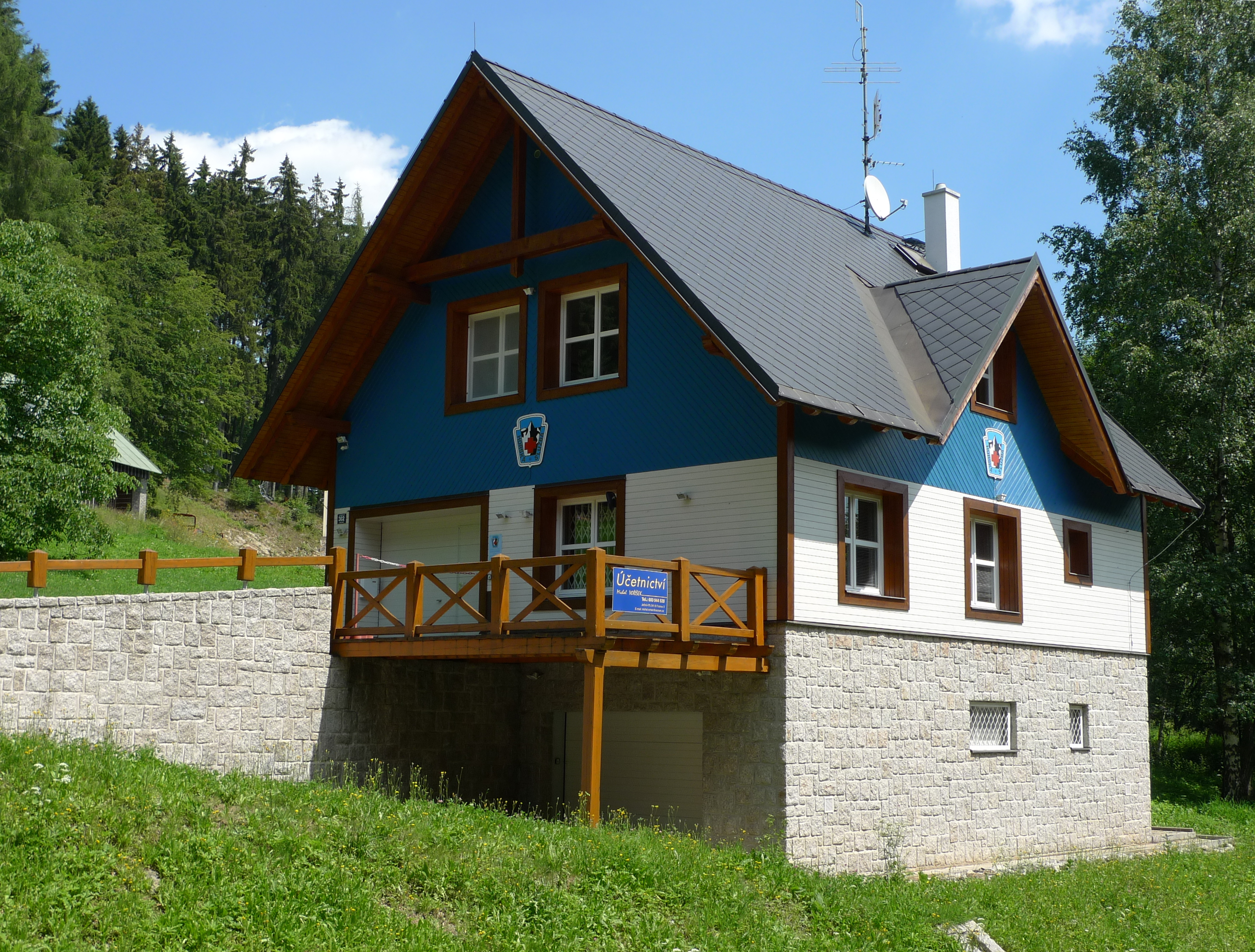
Mountain Rescue Service station in Jánské Lázně

== Payment for rescue operations ==
Only citizens of the Czech Republic are not required to pay for their rescue, other persons have to pay specific fees for treatment and transportation costs. Several insurances cover the Mountain Rescue Service's operations, foreign visitors can locally obtain additional insurance.
