= Hochficht =

Hochficht (Smrčina)
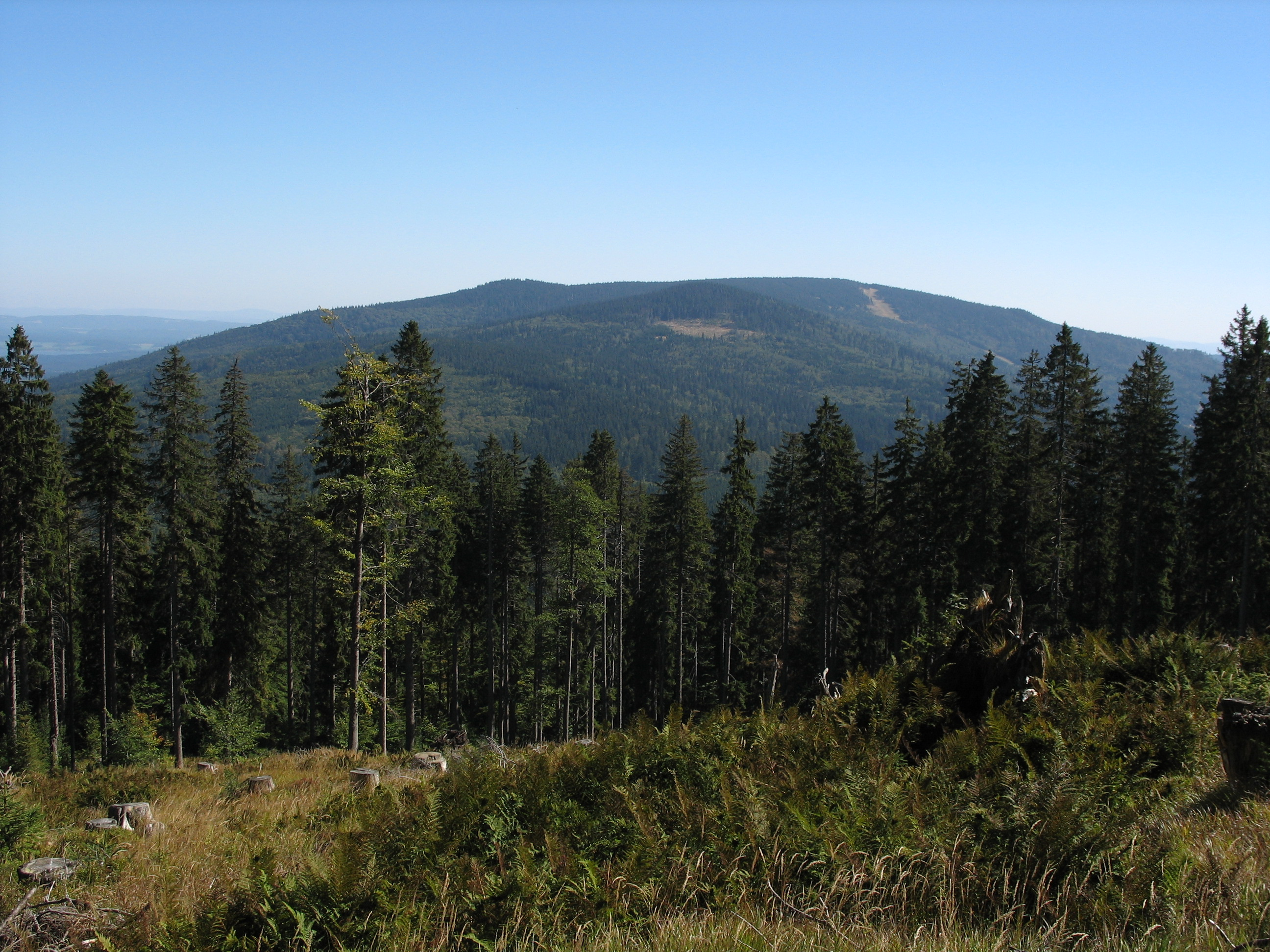

Highest point
- Elevation: 1,338 m (4,390 ft)
- Prominence: 1,338–1,018 m ↓ northwest of Studničná
- Isolation: 5.7 km → Plöckenstein
- Coordinates: 48°44′11″N 13°55′16″E

Geography
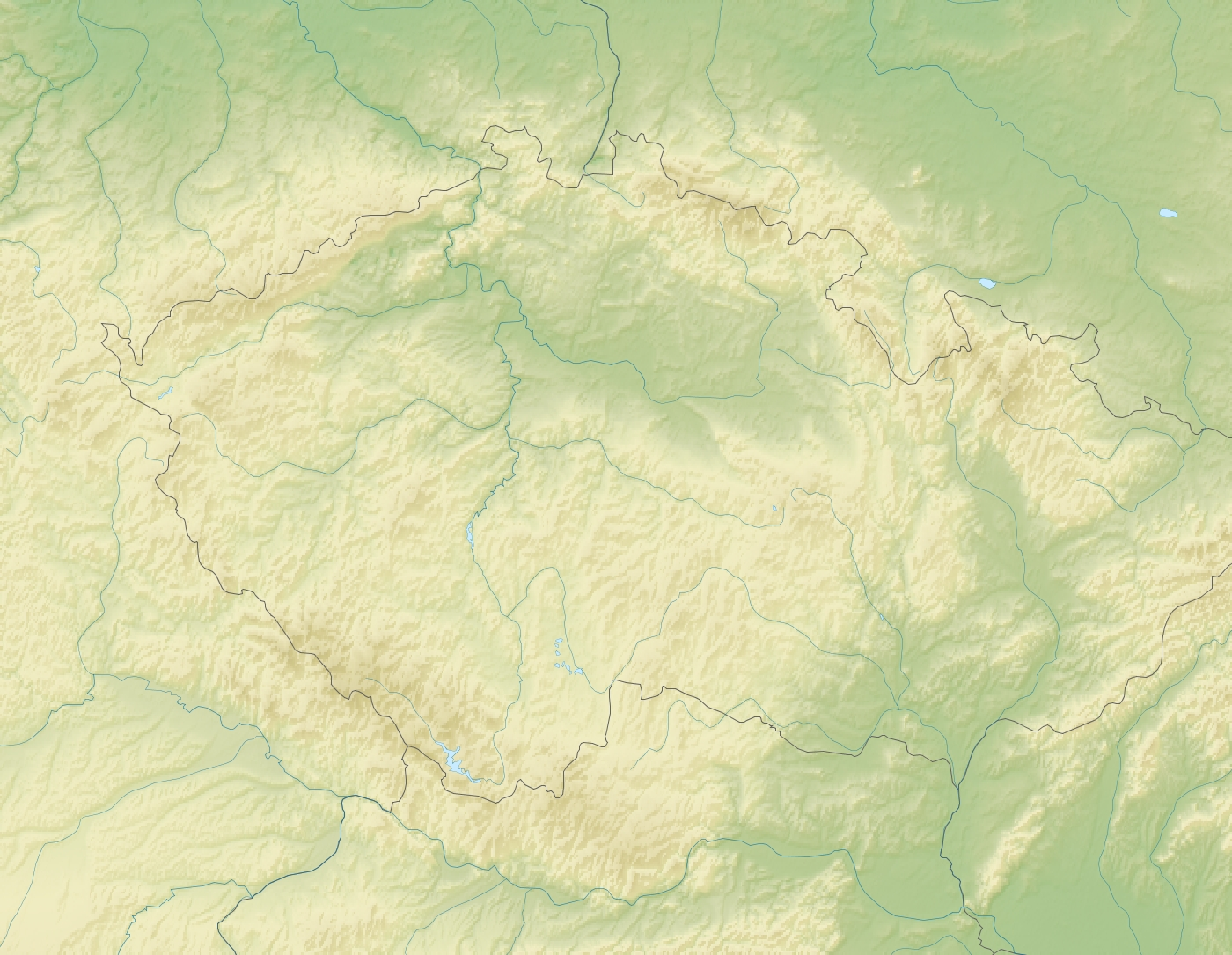
- Location: Upper Austria, Austria and South Bohemian Region, Czech Republic
- Parent range: Bohemian Forest

Geology
- Rock type: Weinsberg Granite

The Hochficht (Czech: Smrčina) is a mountain on the border between Austria and the Czech Republic with an elevation of 1,338 m (4,390 ft). It is situated in the Bohemian Forest mountain range.

The Austrian side belongs to the Klaffer am Hochficht municipality and there is a rock outcrop with a summit cross, a ski lift station and a weather station. The Czech side belongs to the Horní Planá municipality and is in the core zone of the Šumava National Park. The highest point is located on the Austrian side of the mountain, and the Czech–Austrian border has an elevation of 1,333 m (4,373 ft).

== Winter sports area ==
The Hochficht is also a winter sports area, which covers the three adjacent mountain of Zwieselberg (1,163 m above sea level (AA)), Reischlberg (1,281 m above sea level (AA)) and Hochficht, and is open annually to the end of March or early April (usually until Easter). The start of the ski season here depends on the weather. There are 8 pistes with a total length of around 20 km and a ski route. They are served by 2 drag lifts and three 4-seater chair lifts (Hochfichtbahn since 1994, Schwarzenbergbahn since 2001, Zwieselbergbahn since 2004) Since 2017 the 10-seater, 2-leg gondola lift, the Reischlbergbahn, has transported skiers up the Reischlberg. The longest ski run is the Stierwiesen run from the Hochficht, the second longest is the FIS run, on which Europacup races take place. At the Zwieselberg there is also a FIS slalom run, where Europacup races also take place. The majority of pistes (55%) are rated as easy. The valley station is at 800 m. Six langlauf routes, three of which are free, with a total length of around 165 km complete the winter sports facilities.

== Hiking ==
In summer all the lifts are closed and there is only a small café open. Several hiking trails, including the Nordwaldkammweg from the tripoint to the Waldviertel, run over the summit; in addition there are viewing points at Stinglfelsen (1,260 m above sea level (AA)) and Schönbergfelsen (1,305 m above sea level (AA)).
