= Zlatá Koruna =

- Municipality
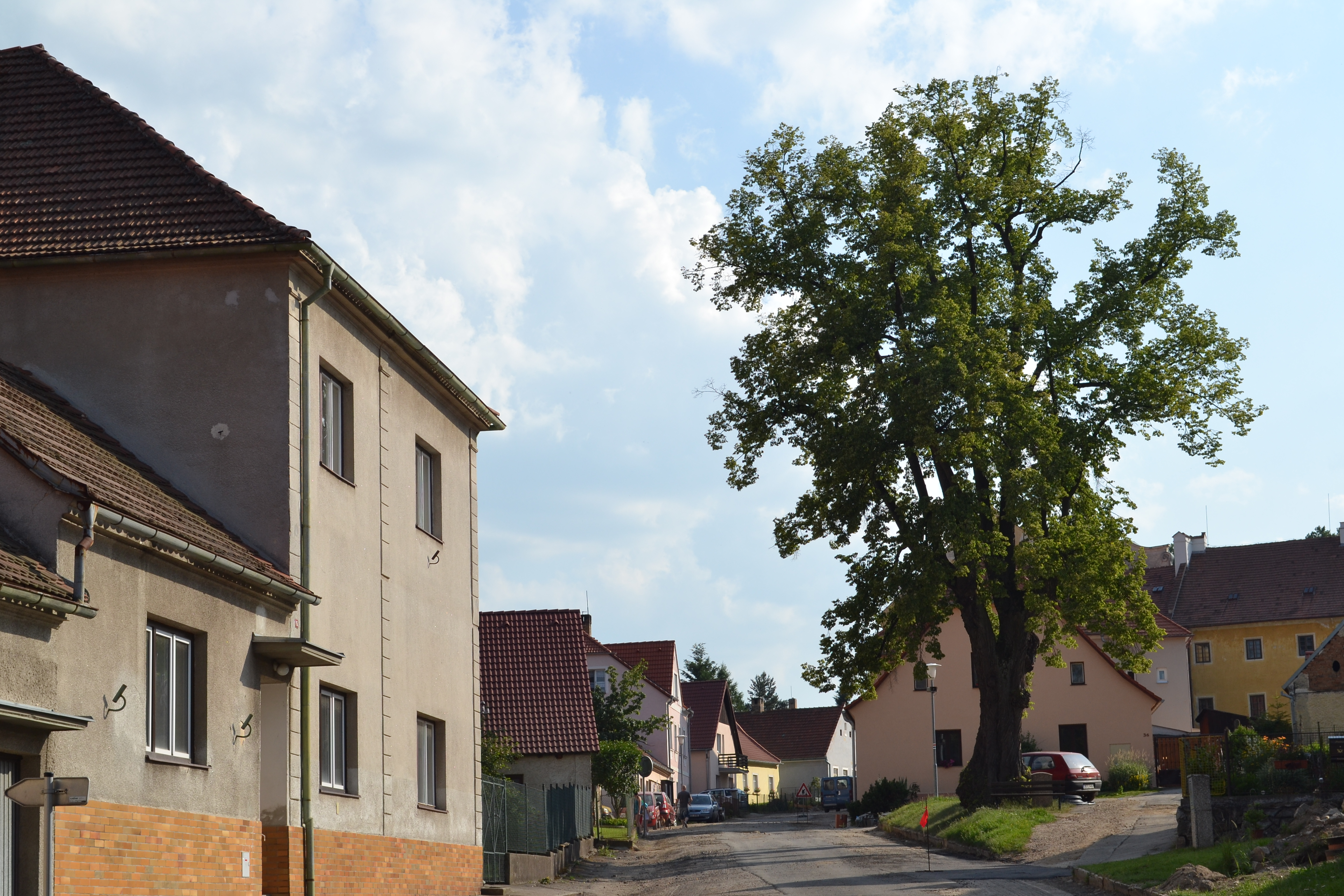
- Centre of Zlatá Koruna

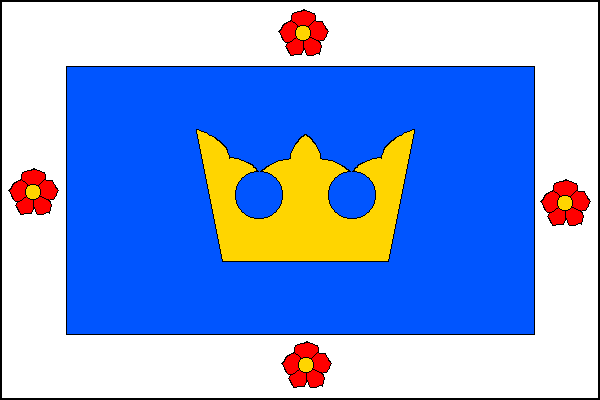
- Flag Coat of arms

- Location in the Czech Republic
- Coordinates: 48°51′17″N 14°22′10″E
- Country: Czech Republic
- Region: South Bohemian
- District: Český Krumlov
- Founded: 1263

Area
  - Total: 8.82 km^{2} (3.41 sq mi)
- Elevation: 473 m (1,552 ft)

Population (2026-01-01)
  - Total: 799
  - Density: 90.6/km^{2} (235/sq mi)
- Time zone: UTC+1 (CET)
  - Summer (DST): UTC+2 (CEST)
- Postal code: 381 01
- Website: www.zlatakoruna.cz

Zlatá Koruna (Czech pronunciation: [ˈzlataː ˈkoruna]; German: Goldenkron) is a municipality and village in Český Krumlov District in the South Bohemian Region of the Czech Republic. It has about 800 inhabitants. The municipality is located on the Vltava River.

Zlatá Koruna is known for the Zlatá Koruna Monastery, which is protected as a national cultural monument.

== Administrative division ==
Zlatá Koruna consists of three municipal parts (in brackets population according to the 2021 census):

- Zlatá Koruna (442)
- Plešovice (133)
- Rájov (197)

== Etymology ==
The initial name of the local monastery was Svatá Koruna ('holy crown'). Allegedly, it was named in honour of the thorn from the crown of French King Louis IX (Saint Louis), with which he dedicated the foundation of the monastery to the Bohemian King Ottokar II. From 1315, the name Zlatá Koruna ('golden crown') appeared.

== Geography ==
Zlatá Koruna is located about 6 kilometres (4 mi) northeast of Český Krumlov and 15 km (9 mi) southwest of České Budějovice. Most of the municipal territory lies in the Gratzen Foothills, only the western part lies in the Bohemian Forest Foothills. The highest point is at 718 m (2,356 ft) above sea level. The Vltava River flows through the municipality; the village of Zlatá Koruna is situated in its meander. A large part of the municipality lies in the Blanský les Protected Landscape Area.

== History ==
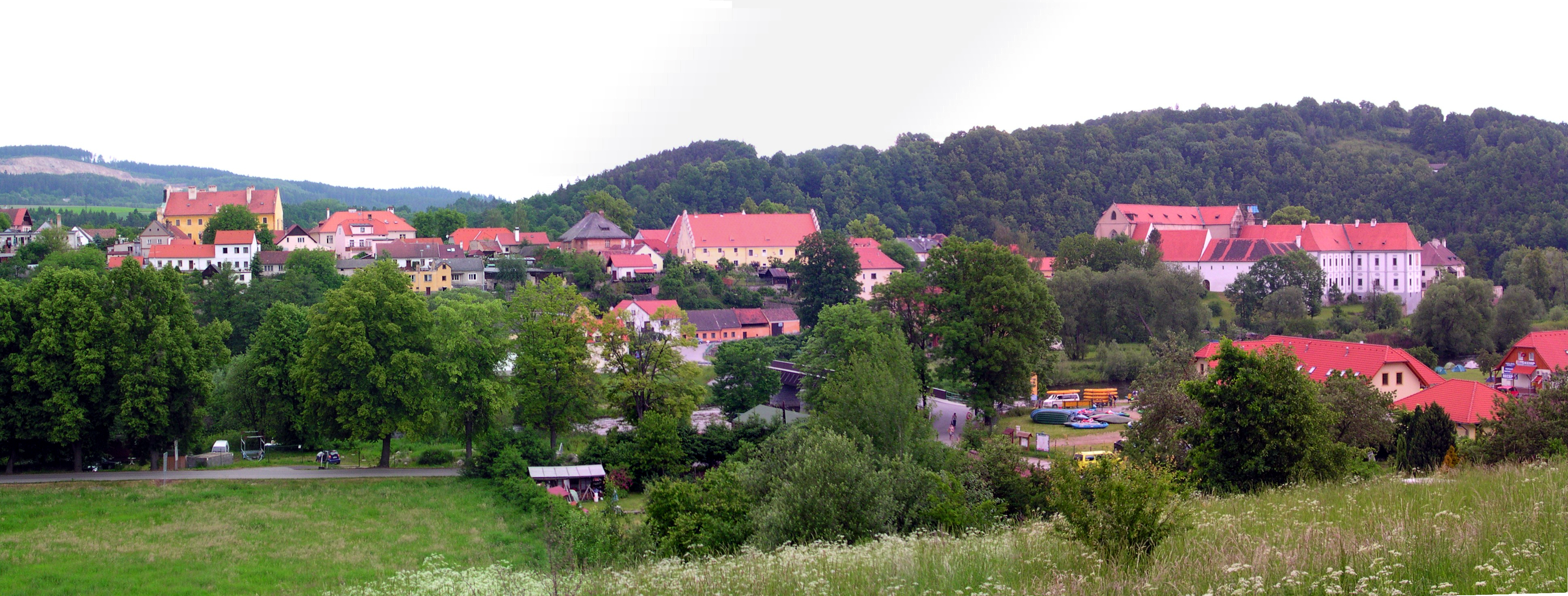
Panorama of Zlatá Koruna with the Cistercian monastery on the right

The Cistercian Zlatá Koruna Monastery was founded in 1263 by King Ottokar II. Until the 18th century, the houses of the inhabitants, who ensured the economic operation of the monastery, were located only inside the monastery complex and were property of the monastery. In 1785, Emperor Joseph II abolished the monastery. In 1787, the Schwarzenberg family bought Zlatá Koruna and the village expanded beyond the borders of the monastery. The Schwarzenbergs rented the former monastery buildings to various manufacturers, and the village began to fill up with workers' houses.

== Demographics ==
Historical population

Year	Pop.	±%
1869	1,133	—
1880	1,079	−4.8%
1890	1,223	+13.3%
1900	1,151	−5.9%
1910	1,044	−9.3%

Year	Pop.	±%
1921	1,088	+4.2%
1930	1,006	−7.5%
1950	815	−19.0%
1961	823	+1.0%
1970	762	−7.4%

Year	Pop.	±%
1980	760	−0.3%
1991	632	−16.8%
2001	638	+0.9%
2011	721	+13.0%
2021	772	+7.1%

Source: Censuses

== Transport ==
The I/39 road, which connects Český Krumlov with České Budějovice, runs through the municipality.

Zlatá Koruna is located on the railway line České Budějovice–Volary.

== Sights ==
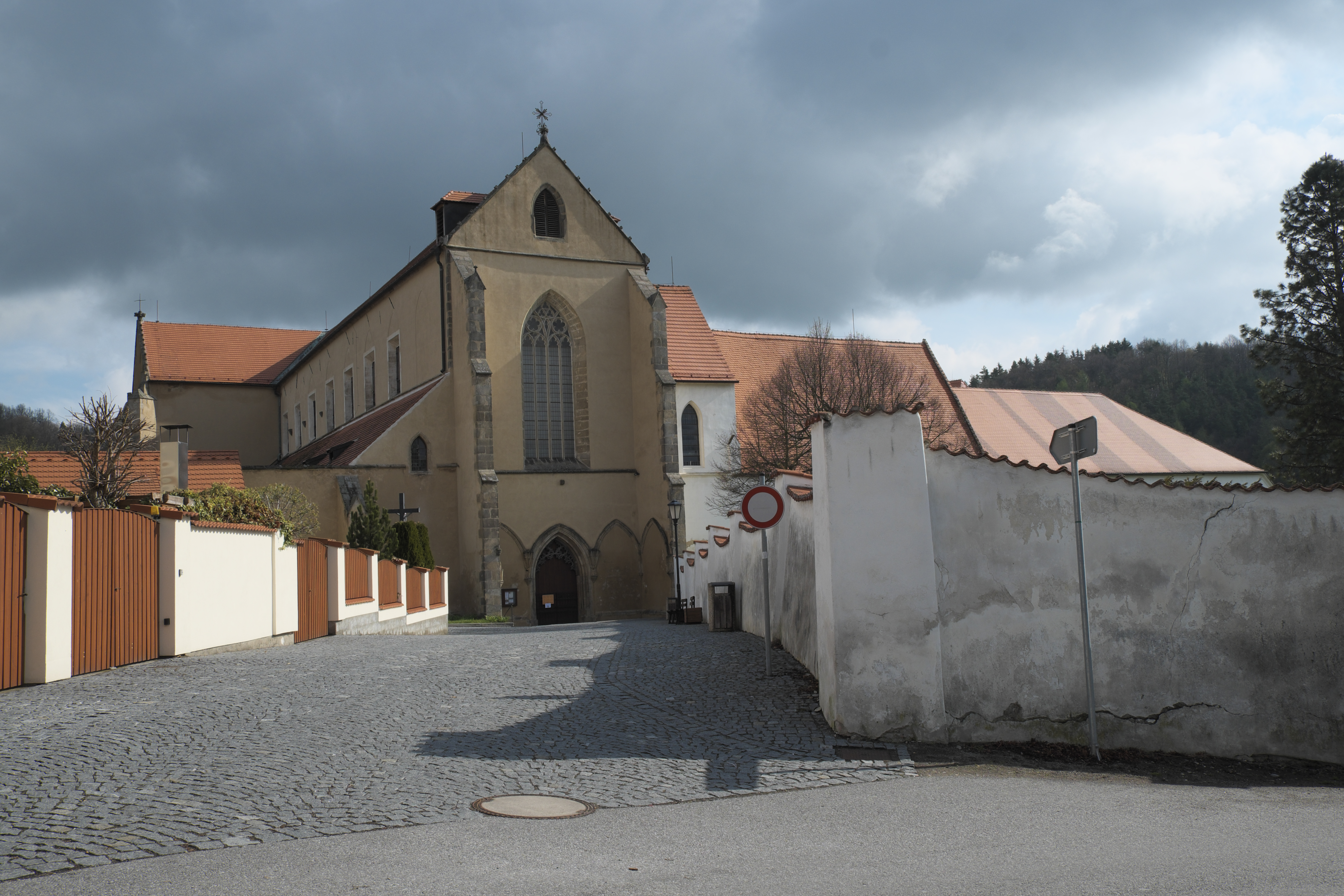
Church of the Assumption of the Virgin Mary

Zlatá Koruna is known for the Zlatá Koruna Monastery, one of the best preserved medieval monasteries in Bohemia. It was built in the early Gothic and high Gothic styles. The monastery complex includes the Church of the Assumption of the Virgin Mary, which is the largest church in the South Bohemian Region. Today the monastery is owned by the state. It is open to the public and offers guided tours. For its value, it is protected as a national cultural monument.

== See also ==
- 4408 Zlatá Koruna, an asteroid
- Female Saint of Dolní Vltavice
