= Alien and Border Police =

Agency responsible for border checks in Czechia

Foreign Police Služba cizinecké policie

Agency overview
- Formed: 1993
- Preceding agency: Pohraniční stráž

Jurisdictional structure
- Operations jurisdiction: Czech Republic
- Governing body: Ministry of the Interior (Czech Republic)
- General nature: Civilian police
- Specialist jurisdictions: Immigration; National border patrol, security, integrity

Operational structure
- Headquarters: Olšanská 2, 130 51, Prague 3, Czech Republic
- Agency executive: plk. Mgr. Aleš Benedikt, Director

Website
- policie.cz/sluzba-cizinecke-policie.aspx

The Foreign Police (Czech: Služba cizinecké policie) is an agency that is responsible for border checks in the Czech Republic.
