= Lipno Reservoir =

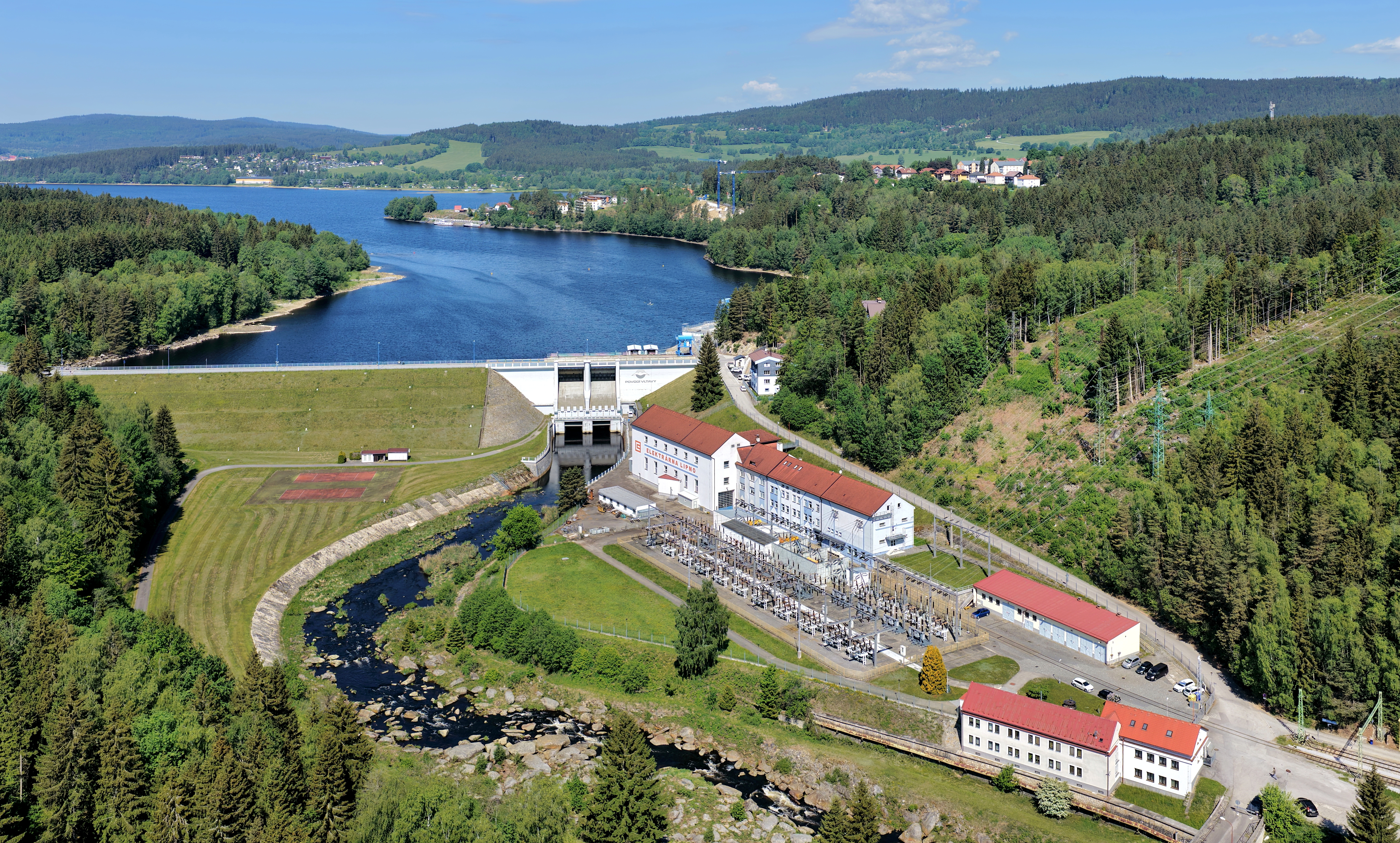

- Location within Czech Republic
- Location: Lipno nad Vltavou
- Coordinates: 48°42′N 14°04′E
- Type: reservoir
- Primary inflows: Vltava
- Primary outflows: Vltava
- Basin countries: Czech Republic
- Max. length: 42 km (26 mi)
- Max. width: 5 km (3.1 mi)
- Surface area: 48.70 km^{2} (18.80 sq mi)
- Average depth: 6.5 m (21 ft)
- Max. depth: 25 m (82 ft)
- Water volume: 309,502,000 m^{3} (250,917 acre⋅ft)
- Surface elevation: 725.6 m (2,381 ft)
- Islands: 1

Lipno Reservoir (Czech: přehrada Lipno) is a dam and hydroelectric plant constructed along the Vltava River in the Czech Republic. It is the largest water area in the Czech Republic.

== History ==
Due to frequent flooding and subsequent damage, the Vltava River in Southern Bohemia was problematic for Český Krumlov and other settlements situated on it. To harness the power of the river, and to prevent continued catastrophe, it was decided that a hydroelectric plant would be built high on the Vltava. Preparatory work at the municipality of Lipno nad Vltavou began in 1951. Construction on the dam began in 1952, and the dam was completed in 1960.

== Geography ==
The stream bed of the Vltava near Lipno was chosen because it has a slight incline, facilitating the construction of a reservoir there. The dam is built along the highest-elevated stage of the Vltava River's cascade (roughly 726 metres above sea level), thus enabling large amounts of hydropower out-put. This area is mountainous, and borders the Šumava National Park and Nature Reserve. A smaller reservoir near Vyšší Brod is linked to the main reservoir by an artificial underground waterway. This smaller reservoir, named 'Lipno II', serves to level the water of the main reservoir.

== Power plant ==
Lipno Hydro Power Plant has two turbines with a nominal capacity of 64 MW each having a total capacity of 128 MW.
