= List of Czech criminals =

This is a list of Czech people who have been convicted of serious crimes.

== Child sex offenders ==
Czechs convicted of child sex offences:

- František Merta
- Hubert Pilčík

== Corruption ==
Czechs convicted of corruption offenses:

- David Rath
- Alexandr Novák

== Fraudsters ==
Czechs convicted of fraud:

- Hynek Bílek
- Milan Brych
- Jan Drozd
- Harry Jelínek
- Viktor Kožený
- Victor Lustig
- Pavel Minařík
- Tomáš Řepka

== Gangsters ==
- Antonín Běla
- Ivan Jonák
- Radovan Krejčíř
- František Mrázek

== Murderers ==
Czechs convicted of murder:

- Vojtěch Běloch
- Bohumír Ďuričko
- Marie Fikáčková
- Jaroslav Gančarčík
- Jiří Kajínek
- Stanislav Kotačka
- Jaroslav Papež
- Jaroslav Řehák
- Miroslav Stehlík
- Stanislav Večeřa
- Martin Vlasák
- Zdeněk Vocásek
- Ladislav Winkelbauer
- Albert Žirovnický

=== Mass murderers ===
- David Kozák
- Zdeněk Konopka
- Olga Hepnarová
- Zdeněk Kovář
- Ctirad Vitásek
- Vladimír Lulek
- Jiří Popelka
- Josef Svoboda
- Romana Zienertová

=== Serial killers ===
- Oto Biederman: member of "The Kolínský Gang" who murdered five people from 1993 to 1995, including a former accomplice; sentenced to life imprisonment.
- Jan Philopon Dambrovský: Roman Catholic priest who poisoned four archbishops in the 16th-century; arrested and later executed.
- Jaroslava Fabiánová: murdered four men between 1981 and 2003 for financial reasons; sentenced to life imprisonment.
- Ladislav Hojer: sadist who raped and strangled at least five women from 1978 to 1981 around Czechoslovakia; executed in 1986.
- Kateřina of Komárov: 16th-century noblewoman who tortured and maimed between 14 and 30 serfs in Pičín and Příbram; exiled to Prague Castle, where she died in March 1534.
- Václav Mrázek: convicted of the murders of seven women around Chomutov; executed in 1957.
- Martin Lecián: responsible for killing three policemen and a prison officer; executed in 1927.
- Orlík killers: five-man gang who killed people for monetary gain from 1991 to 1993, then stuffed their bodies in barrels and dumped them in dams; sentenced to various terms of imprisonment.
- Hubert Pilčík: killed at least five people whom he helped cross the border from Czechoslovakia into West Germany; committed suicide in prison in 1951.
- Martin Roháč: former soldier who robbed and killed 59 people between 1568 and 1571 with his accomplices; all were executed in 1571.
- Ivan Roubal: occultist who murdered five people from 1991 to 1994; sentenced to life imprisonment and died in 2015.
- Svatoslav Štěpánek: known as "The Roudnice Monster"; killed one child and at least two women in Roudnice nad Labem from 1926 to 1936, mutilating the female victims' bodies; executed in 1938.
- Jaroslav and Dana Stodolovi: couple who robbed and killed eight pensioners from 2001 to 2002; both sentenced to life imprisonment.
- Jiří Straka: known as "The Spartakiad Killer"; teenager who raped and robbed 11 women in Prague between February and May 1985, killing three; sentenced to 10 years imprisonment and psychiatric treatment, released in 2004.
- Petr Zelenka: male nurse convicted of murdering seven patients in Havlíčkův Brod by lethal injections to "test" doctors; sentenced to life imprisonment.

=== Spree killers ===
- Viktor Kalivoda
- Josef Kott and Michael Kutílek
- Roman Postl

== Rapists ==
Czechs convicted of rape:

- Jaroslav Barták
- Jaroslav Dobeš
- Dominik Feri
- Jaroslav Gančarčík
- Ladislav Hojer
- Hubert Pilčík
- Miroslav Stehlík
- Jiří Straka

== Robbers and thieves ==
Czechs convicted of robbery or theft:

- Josef Koudela
- Johana Peřková

== Terrorism ==
- Jaromír Balda
- Samer Shehadeh

== War criminals ==
- Stanislav Kotačka
- Bedřich Pokorný
- Karel Vaš

== Others ==
- Ludmila Brožová-Polednová
- Tomáš Plavnický
