= 2023 Prague shootings =

Mass murder in the Czech Republic

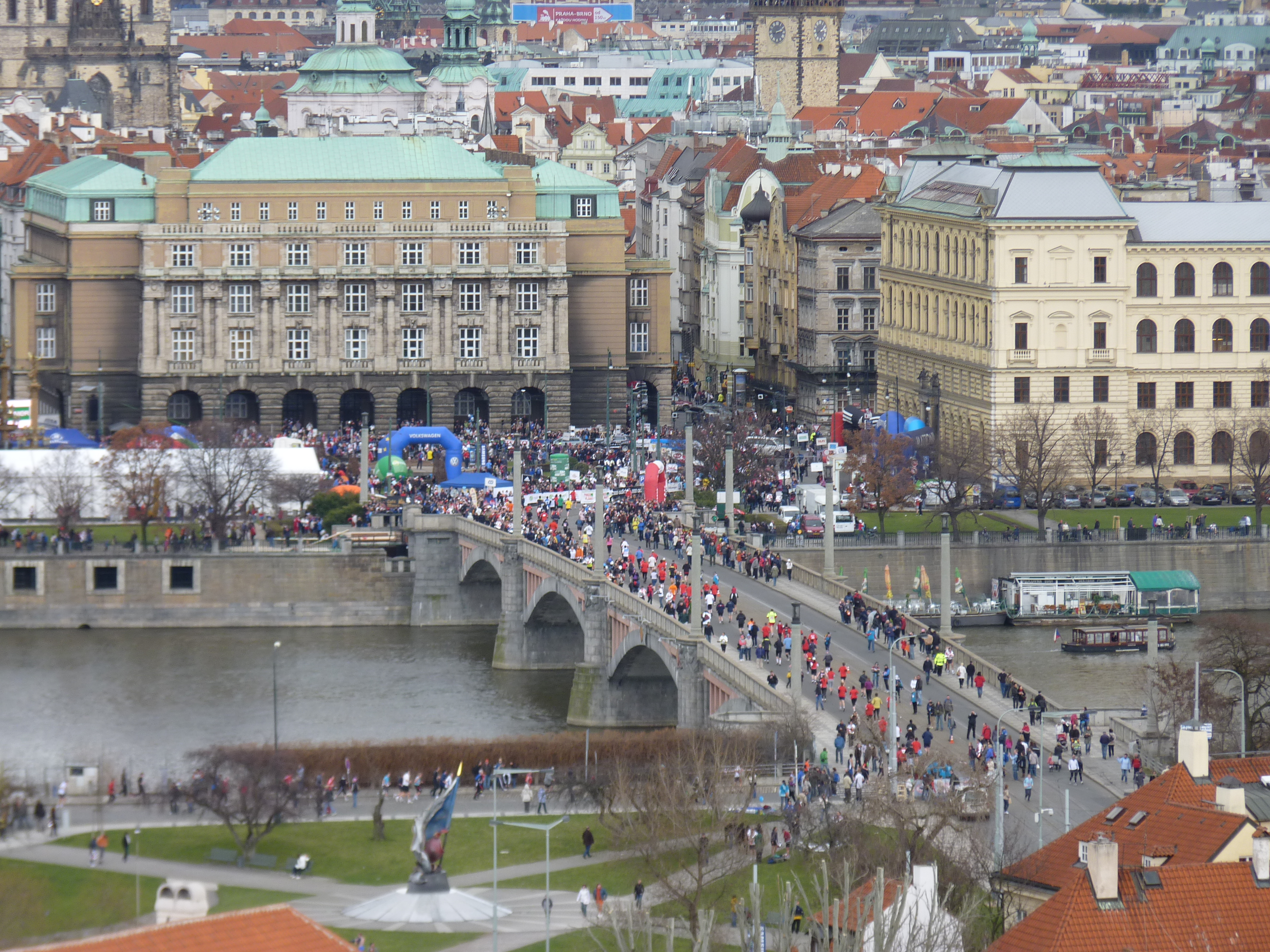
- Faculty of Arts, Charles University and Mánes Bridge, the site of the shooting

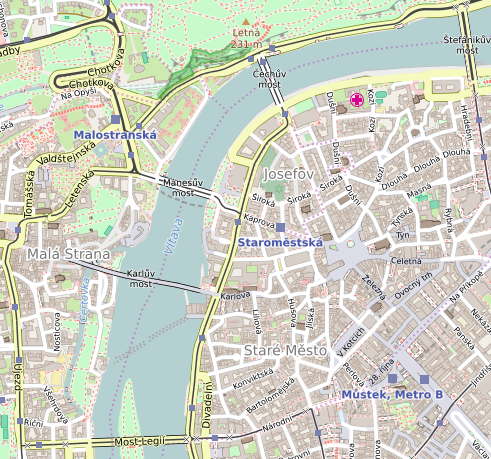
- 2023 Prague shootings (Prague city centre)
- Location: 50°05′21″N 14°24′58″E (Faculty of Arts, Charles University main building); Prague and Hostouň, Czech Republic
- Date: Klánovice Forest murders: 15 December 2023; Charles University attack: 21 December 2023; 14:54 – 15:19 (CET, UTC+1)
- Target: Students and staff at Charles University and random civilians
- Attack type: School shooting; mass shooting; mass murder; spree shooting; murder–suicide; patricide; pedicide
- Weapons: Klánovice Forest: 9mm Glock 45 semi-automatic pistol w/ silencer; Hostouň: .380 ACP Škorpion semi-automatic pistol; Charles University: 9mm Glock 47 semi-automatic pistol w/ silencer (inside); .22 LR SIG Sauer P322 semi-automatic pistol w/ silencer (inside); .308 ZEV AR-10 semi-automatic rifle (on terrace); 12-gauge Francolin Guardian pump-action shotgun (inside & perpetrator's suicide)
- Deaths: 18 (including the perpetrator) (Note: 2 in Klánovice Forest on 15 December; Perpetrator's father in Hostouň on 21 December; 15 at Charles University on 21 December (including the perpetrator and 1 indirect death))
- Injuries: 25
- Perpetrator: David Kozák
- Motive: Revenge on society

Location of the murder sites in and around Prague. Hostouň is located just off the edge of this map.

Between 15 and 21 December 2023, 24-year-old David Kozák killed 13 people and injured 25 others in a spree shooting in and around Prague, Czech Republic. Kozák first killed a 32-year-old father and his two-month-old daughter in the Klánovice Forest on 15 December 2023. He was one of about 4,000 potential suspects whom the authorites had identified in the murders, but committed the University attacks before the police managed to focus down onto him. Six days later, Kozák fatally shot his father at his home in Hostouň and then committed a mass shooting at the Charles University Faculty of Arts main building before killing himself after exchanging gunfire with police; an additional victim died indirectly from falling to her death while trying to escape the perpetrator.

The shooting was the deadliest mass murder in the Czech Republic since its independence in 1993, surpassing the 2020 Bohumín arson attack.

== Events ==
=== Klánovice Forest murders and initial investigation ===
On 15 December 2023, a 32-year-old father and his two-month-old daughter in a stroller were shot dead in the Klánovice Forest on the eastern outskirts of Prague, approximately 25 kilometres (16 mi) away from Charles University. Later investigation revealed that the perpetrator, David Kozák, had only visited the Klánovice Forest once before committing the murders. On the day of the Charles University shooting, he had written a suicide note on his computer detailing the Klánovice murders; he had also hidden the murder weapon in the family garden, outside of the house that was rigged with IED. According to the letter, Kozák used public transport on the day of the murders and switched off his phone while changing transport on the other side of Prague. He carried a brown beige backpack and was armed with two handguns—a Glock 45 and a Beretta 71.

Upon entering the forest, Kozák initially wanted to shoot a woman with two children whom he saw at a playground along the main forest path, but then he noticed a man with a stroller heading towards a side path and decided that he was an easier target. Kozák followed him closely for a while before shooting the man multiple times using the Glock 45 pistol, which was equipped with a silencer. He then fired two rounds into the stroller, killing the man's infant daughter, before fleeing the scene.

Kozák fled on foot towards Úvaly, took a bus to Klánovice railway station, and left the area by train sometime between 16:00 and 16:45 CET. At some point during his escape, he passed by a couple with a stroller and considered shooting them as well but decided not to after hearing sirens in the distance.

The police conducted a detailed search of the entire forest with hundreds of officers, while a special task force was set up in order to find the perpetrator. As police had no direct leads, the scope of the investigation was first directed at owners of registered firearms matching the ballistic report from the crime scene, which initially limited the search to about 30,000 people. This was then further limited to 4,000 people, of which about 40 people lived in the vicinity of the Klánovice Forest. On 20 December, police said that they had no leads in the case but were continuing to search for the perpetrator.

Once a personal or work-related motive was exhausted, the investigation focused on the possibility of a random murder. The firearms website zbrojnice.com noted a similarity of the case with the 2005 "Forest Killer" murders, in which a former police officer killed three random victims in forests in preparation for a planned mass murder in the Prague Metro, which was prevented by his early arrest; the article ended with an appeal to readers to remain vigilant and carry their concealed firearms.

The chief detective of Prague's 1st General Crime Unit said that because Kozák lived in the Central Bohemian Region, which has a separate police directorate from Prague, they were a few days short of being able to prevent the Charles University attack.

=== Hostouň patricide and police manhunt ===
At an unknown time on 21 December 2023, six days after the Klánovice Forest murders, Kozák murdered his father, 55-year-old Stanislav Kozák, by shooting him three times in the head at their home in Hostouň, about 9 kilometres (5.6 mi) west of Prague. Stanislav was shot from behind with a semi-automatic variant of the Škorpion machine pistol while sitting at a table, before his body was moved and his neck was laid on a block of wood. An axe was found lying next to him, which indicated that Kozák had probably intended to cut his father's head off but did not do so for unknown reasons.

At 12:19 CET, the Central Bohemian Police received a call from Kozák's mother. One minute later, a friend of Kozák's, only identified as K.C., called the medical emergency line, saying Kozák was planning to take his own life. She also said that "[Kozák] could be dangerous", that he told her "he will do something she will hear about", and that he was on his way to Prague from his hometown of Hostouň. Police officers went to the Kozák residence at 12:33 and found his father's body, as well as improvised explosive devices that were decommissioned by specialists later that day. The police discovered that Kozák was a student of Charles University's Faculty of Arts in Prague. A search warrant was issued, indicating that Kozák was armed and dangerous.

At 13:10, the Central Bohemian Police, whose jurisdiction the village of Hostouň falls under, directly alerted the Prague Police. The Prague police dispatcher issued an all-points bulletin (APB), which said that Kozák was being sought due to suicide threats, that he may be dangerous, and that he also may be connected to a violent crime. A security operation was commenced at Václav Havel Airport near Hostouň, where Kozák worked alongside his father, a member of the airport security department. Prague Police also checked the Central Registry of Firearms, noting that Kozák owns multiple firearms, and that one of them was of the same type of focus in the Klánovice Forest murders investigation. The APB was expanded with information that Kozák should be considered extremely dangerous.

At 13:23, Kozák entered the Faculty of Arts main building on Jan Palach Square through the busy main entrance without arousing any suspicion. He was carrying a heavy suitcase containing firearms, a large amount of ammunition, cleavers, chains, and bicycle locks. Kozák proceeded to the fourth-floor bathrooms, where he apparently remained until the start of the attack. Before the shooting, he placed his ID, a floor plan of the fourth floor with handwritten notes about the classrooms' capacities, an unopened alcohol bottle, and a Rivotril pack under the bathroom window.

At 13:30, two police units, altogether six officers, entered the main building, where they talked to the reception personnel and two vice deans whom they met in the corridors. The officers searched the building's ground and first floors, then visited the Student Affairs Office and the Department of History. There, they learned that Kozák was supposed to attend a lecture starting at 14:00 in a different building on Celetná Street, a twelve-minute walk from the main building.

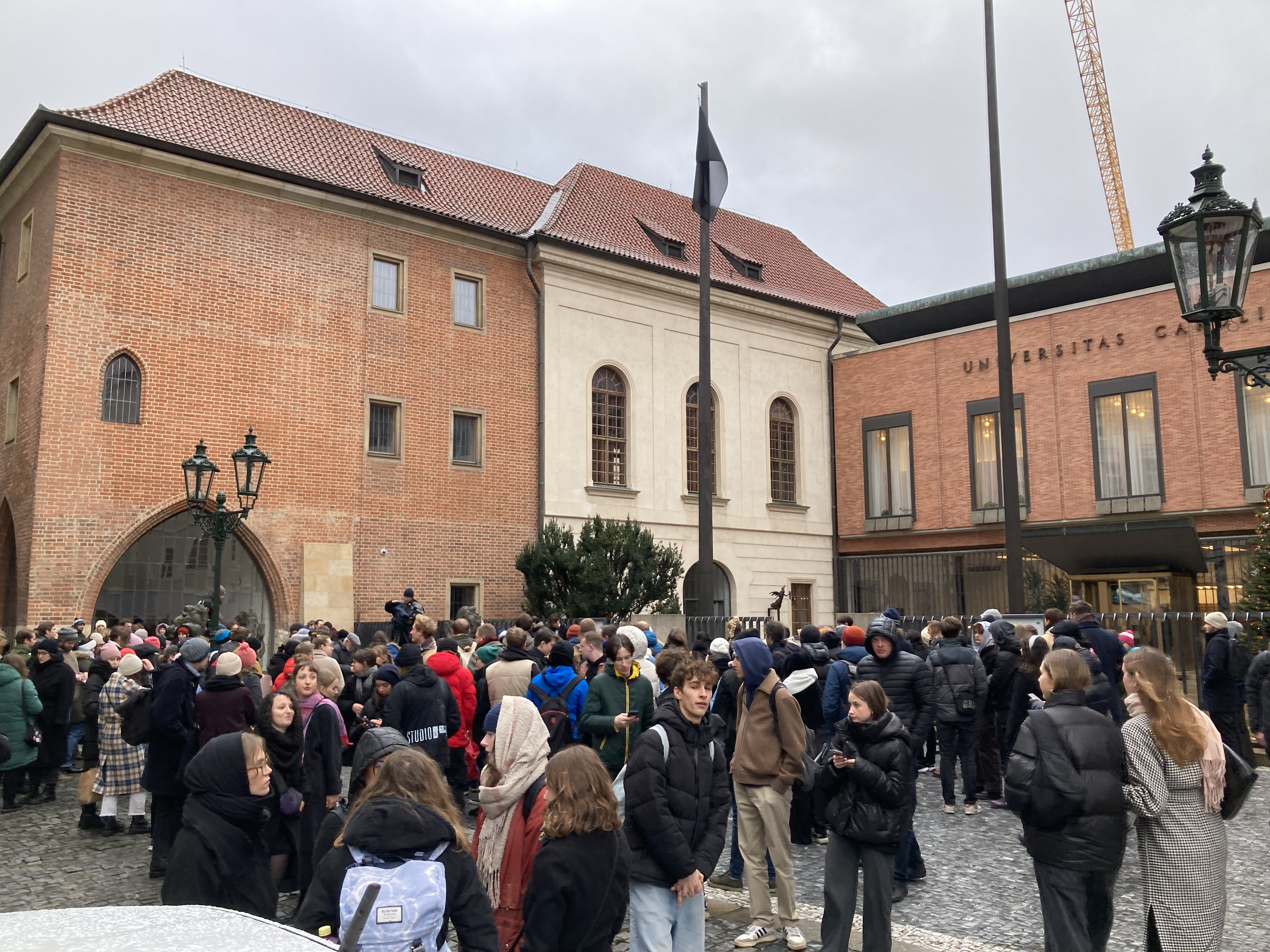
The Faculty of Arts building on Celetná Street, Charles University, evacuated prior to the shooting (photographed the day after the shootings)

At 13:57, multiple police units were sent to evacuate the Celetná building, including the six police officers who searched the main building. They left without taking any further action and proceeded to the Celetná building, where they would stand guard until the start of the attack. At 14:04, the following information was relayed by the dispatcher through the police radio transmitter:

Increased caution for all patrols in the case of this Kozák. He's a really dangerous, very dangerous offender, suspect, and there's a lot of concern that he could use a weapon anytime, anywhere.

The evacuation of Celetná building was finished at 14:22; Kozák was not found in the building or in its vicinity. Multiple students who were evacuated from the Celetná building subsequently walked to the main building at Jan Palach Square. At 14:38, Kozák's phone was turned on and registered by a telecommunications tower located near the Old Jewish Cemetery about 100 metres (330 ft) from the main building. The manhunt thus continued on the street level in this area, including the Jewish Quarter, Pařížská street, the Old Town Square, and Staroměstská metro station. Dozens of heavily armed police officers, including the Prague SWAT unit, were spread out in the crowded area where Christmas markets were taking place. Some plainclothes criminal detectives moved from the Celetná building into the wider area of Jan Palach Square in front of the main building. They did not enter the main building as they were informed that it had already been searched by other police units.

=== Charles University shooting ===
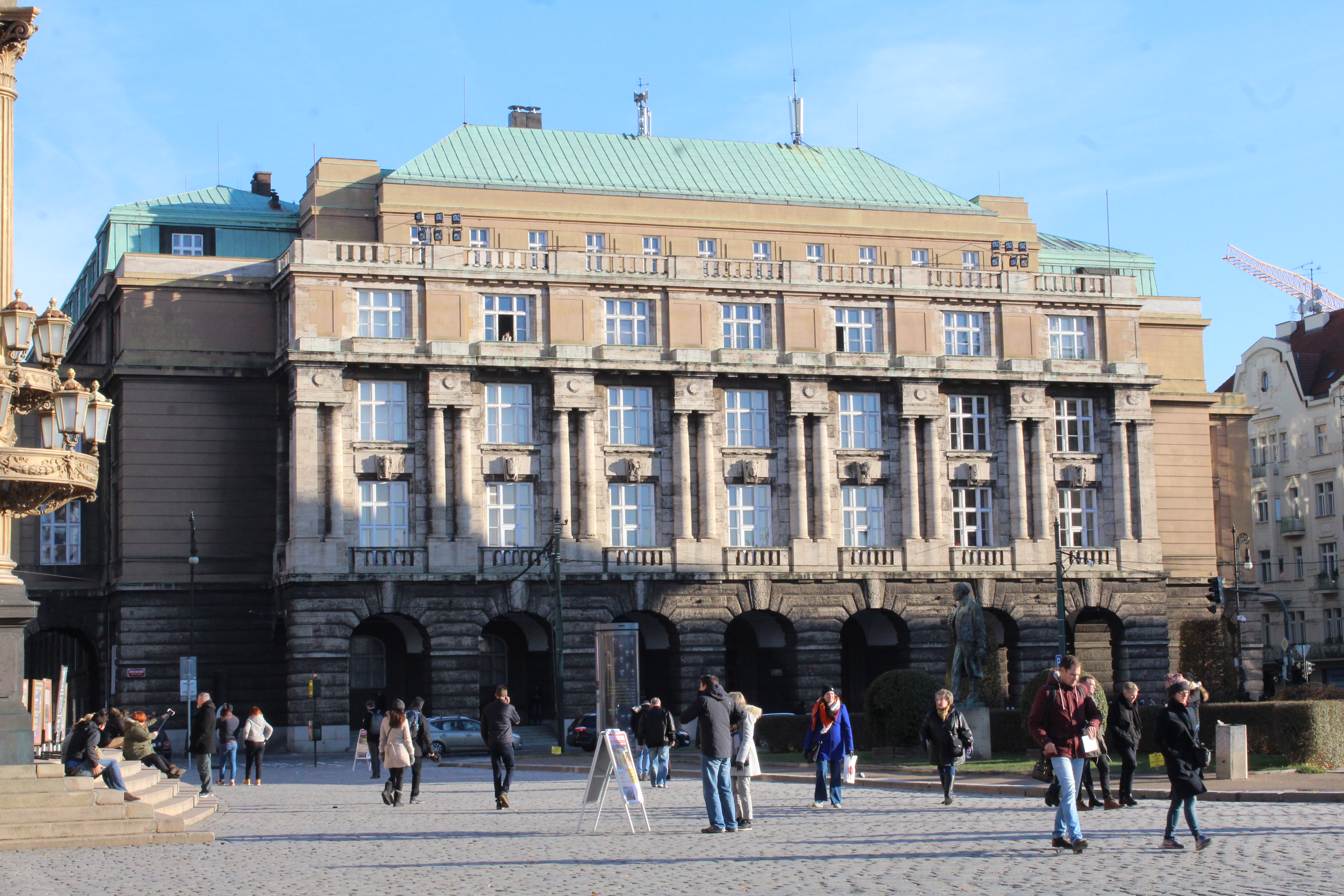
The Faculty of Arts, Charles University main building at Jan Palach Square

At around 14:54 CET, Kozák, armed with a pistol, exited the restroom and opened fire inside the main building's fourth-floor corridors and classrooms. He repeatedly entered classroom no. 423, targeting everyone inside. Once he moved further away from this classroom, one of the students led the remaining survivors to barricade the door. All of the people in this classroom were either killed or suffered life-threatening injuries.

A third-year history student named Tomáš Hercík has been credited with saving the lives of several people during the shooting. At 14:59, one of the students present at a lecture taking place on the second floor received a message about the ongoing killing spree, prompting Hercík to head to the fourth floor. While passing by the third floor, he noticed people mingling in the corridors, seemingly unaware of the ongoing attack. Upon reaching the fourth floor, he immediately heard gunshots and people's cries. While avoiding Kozák, Hercík entered numerous classrooms and warned the people inside about the shooting, making sure that they locked the doors, switched off the lights, and remained quiet. He then retreated to the third floor, where he continued warning classrooms.

Several of the students present in other fourth-floor classrooms fled to the exterior terrace, then climbed onto a ledge on the other side of the building before jumping to a third-floor balcony, sustaining injuries from the fall. Among them was student athlete Klára Holcová, who slipped from the ledge and fell to her death.

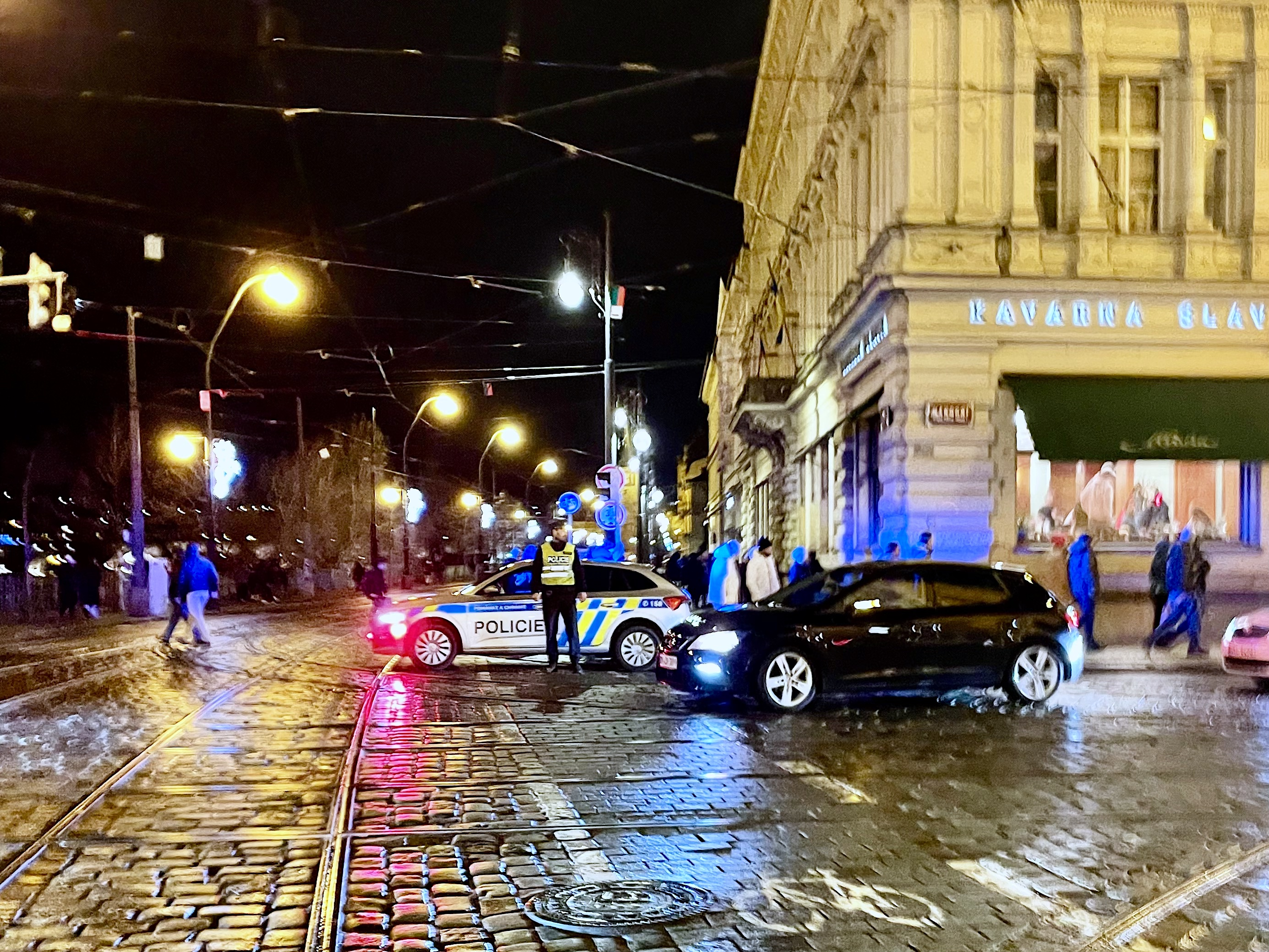
Police gradually shut down a large part of Prague's city centre during the shooting

At 14:57:28, the medical emergency line received the first phone call about the attack. Police were alerted to the shooting at 14:59:06 and arrived about three minutes later. By that point, the gunfire had temporarily ceased, which led police officers to move slowly in "search mode" instead of the fast "contact mode". Students were evacuated from the lower floors to the Rudolfinum across the street, while the search party headed upstairs.

Outside the building, three plainclothes police detectives from a car theft unit entered Jan Palach Square through the Mánes Bridge and began forcing onlookers to take cover behind the Rudolfinum. As they were clearing out the square, at 15:11:19, Kozák started shooting from the fourth-floor exterior terrace using his AR-10 rifle. The gunfire caused panic outside the building, with crowds of people fleeing the nearby Charles Bridge.

Detective First Sergeant Jiří P. took cover behind a thick lamp post and started relaying information about Kozák's actions over the radio. Armed with only a Glock 19 pistol, he initially hesitated to shoot back as there were multiple windows within the perpetrator's vicinity, and he was concerned about hitting people who were inside the building. Reporter Jiří Forman, who took cover behind Jiří P., recorded Kozák's actions from the ground. Forman shouted at Kozák in an attempt to draw his attention away from students evacuating the building; Kozák appeared to have seen Forman and fired shots in his direction. Kozák was visible only for a few brief moments to those outside, as he kept moving around the terrace and out of view from the ground.

Meanwhile, officers who were searching the third floor were alerted that Kozák was shooting at people outside. It was first erroneously reported that the gunman was on the rooftop when he was actually on the fourth-floor terrace, directly above the officers searching the building. The officers then lost time searching for a route towards the fourth floor and then to the outer terrace, as the area is difficult to navigate; while the first three floors are accessible by the main central staircase, the position of the side staircase leading to the fourth floor was not immediately visible to the officers.

At 15:12, the advancing police forces reached the fourth floor with assistance from Hercík and split into two groups. The first group continued their search for Kozák, while the second group began initiating first aid to the victims in the corridor. Authorities reported seeing "piles of ammunition" inside the building, adding that Kozák had brought multiple weapons into the university. The city's emergency services also deployed a large number of ambulance units to the scene.

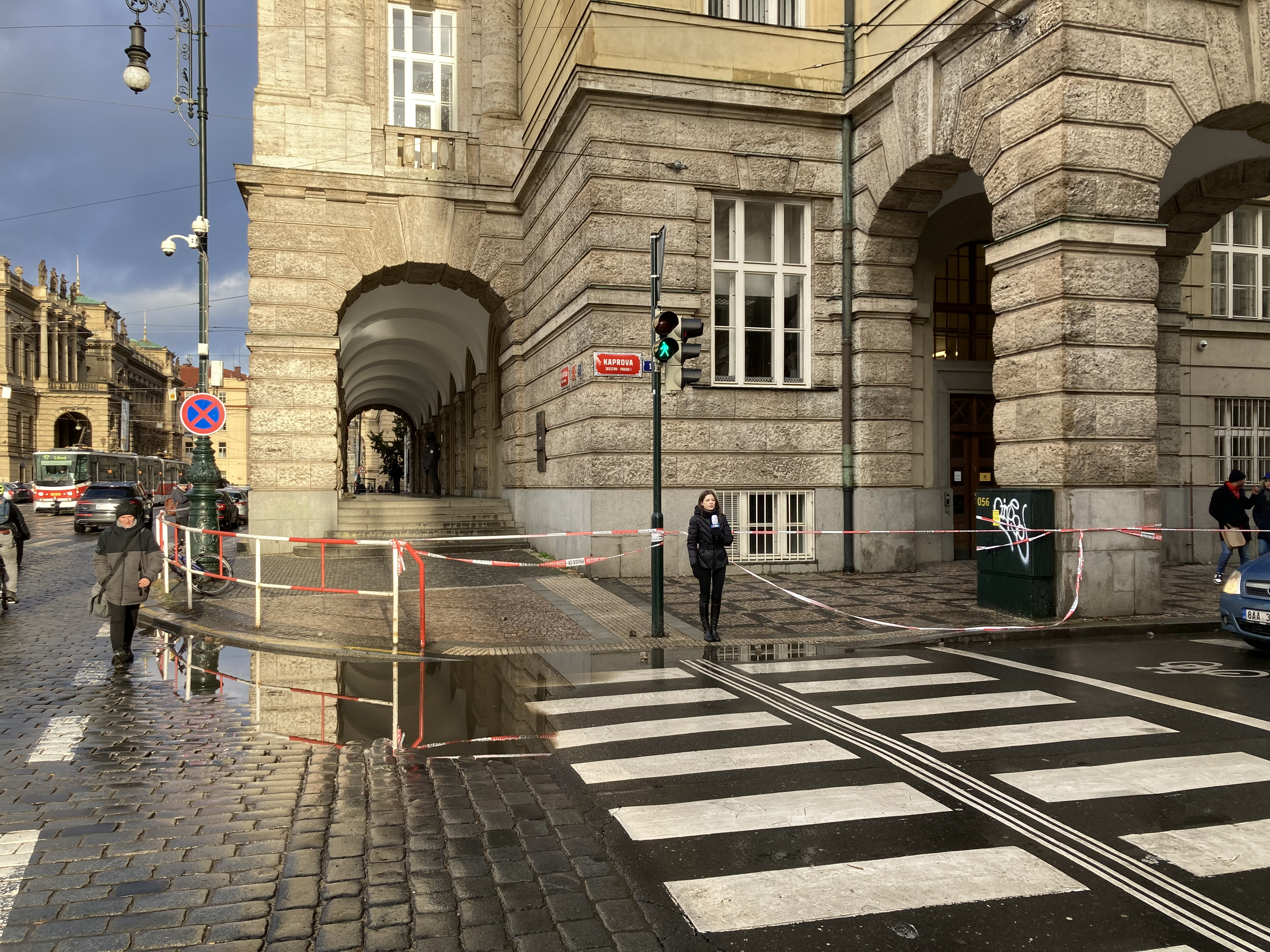
The Faculty of Arts main building and its surroundings remained closed the day after the mass shooting

In total, Kozák fired thirteen rounds from his rifle, with the last shot being fired at 15:18:51. In between shots, Kozák moved towards the right side of the terrace, which gave First Sergeant Jiří P. the opportunity to move to a better vantage point. Between 15:18:54 and 15:18:59, as Kozák was briefly visible to those below, Jiří P. fired three shots at him from a distance of 105 metres (344 ft). Two of the shots closely missed Kozák, with one bullet hitting a wall behind him and the other hitting a spotlight just above his head. Meanwhile, two other officers armed with G36 carbines climbed to the top floor of a hotel on the opposite side of the street. At 15:18:57, one of the officers aimed his carbine at Kozák through a closed window but did not fire at him. Kozák was likely not aware of the police presence in the opposite building.

At 15:19:10, Kozák threw his loaded rifle off the roof and then, at 15:19:24, committed suicide by shooting himself in the head with a shotgun, bringing the rampage to an end. At 15:23, policemen entered classrooms 423 and 417, where the majority of the victims were situated, and started providing first aid. At 15:25, other policemen reached the fourth-floor terrace, where they confirmed the perpetrator's death.

== Victims ==
List of victims

Klánovice Forest
- Martin P., 32
- Unnamed two-month-old daughter

Hostouň

- Stanislav Kozák, 55 (perpetrator's father)

Charles University

- Eva Brožová, 20 (student)
- Jan Dlask, 50 (lecturer, Department of Germanic Studies)
- Ad Feynmann, 20 (student)
- Lucie Fríbertová, 23 (student)
- Lenka Hlávková, 49 (Head of the Institute of Musicology)
- Klára Holcová, 20 (student)
- Adam Jurák, 34 (student)
- Magdalena Křístková, 20 (student)
- Sára Lidická, 19 (student)
- Agáta Michalová, 21 (student)
- Aneta Richterová, 20 (student)
- Tereza Skolková, 23 (student)
- Eliška Šimůnková, 20 (student)
- Lucie Špindlerová, 20 (student)

The shootings claimed the lives of 17 people, not counting the perpetrator. Three people were murdered prior to the attack at Charles University: a 32-year-old man and his two-month-old daughter were killed in Klánovice Forest on 15 December 2023, while Kozák's father was killed at their home on the morning of the attack.

Fourteen people—two staff members and 12 students—died during the Charles University attack. Thirteen people were pronounced dead on the scene, including one who fell from an exterior ledge, and one died from their injuries at hospital. Twenty-five people were also injured, with 10 of them being in serious condition; some of them sustained injuries while jumping from the fourth-floor ledge to escape Kozák. Three of the wounded were shot outside the building when Kozák opened fire from the fourth-floor terrace. Three vehicles, including two police cars, were also hit by gunfire.

One of the injured victims was a daughter of MP and Parliamentary Committee for Education member Jan Richter, who criticized police for allegedly wrongly triaging her as a low-priority victim; consequently, Richter's daughter nearly bled to death before reaching a hospital. Three foreign nationals—one Dutch and two Emiratis—were reported to be among the injured.

Two of the victims were staff members: Lenka Hlávková, head of the Institute of Musicology of Charles University, and Jan Dlask, a lecturer at the university's Department of Germanic Studies. The remaining fatalities were students, consisting of 10 women and two men between the ages of 19 and 34.

== Investigation ==
=== Department of Internal Investigation ===
On 9 January 2024, the Czech Police's Department of Internal Investigation presented the conclusion of its inquiry into police conduct during the attack. The department's director, Michal Tikovský, stated that they had found no mistakes in the police's handling of the case, adding that the officers' actions were "in accordance with the applicable legislation and internal regulations. The police intervention can be assessed as prompt and professional." Tikovský said the police could not have known where the perpetrator was heading, nor that he was preparing to carry out a mass murder. Applicable rules had also been followed when issuing the perpetrator's gun license.

The Parliamentary Security Committee requested the department's closing report. On 6 February 2024, they received a fifty-page report, but most of the pages were either completely or largely redacted, with the unredacted pages indicating that the police supposedly had no information about the perpetrator's intentions; on page 39, it was stated that "it cannot be concluded that the police knew that the lives of the students of the Faculty of Philosophy in the building on Jana Palach Square were in real and immediate danger." Opposition ANO party members were angered by the redaction of the document and stated their intent to establish a Parliamentary Inquiry Commission with full investigative powers in order to receive complete information about the case.

=== Public criticism of police ===
"They were covering it up from the beginning, that no one could have expected what he would do, and that it would be just a normal suicide. I think the arsenal of weapons he had, the fact that he killed his father and planted a bomb in the house, should have led everyone to know that this was not normal."
– Father of one of the victims

While the police intervention during the attack was generally accepted as correct, strong criticism was aimed at apparent mistakes in its search for Kozák beforehand. In January 2024, Prague Police Chief Petr Matějček defended the police's actions, claiming that the authorities were acting under the impression that Kozák was a danger only to himself due to his remarks about committing suicide. Interior Minister Vít Rakušan also commented that authorities had no indication of anyone else at risk other than the perpetrator himself, and that the police had only known about the death of Kozák's father after decommissioning the explosives found within his home, which took place after the university attack had ended.

These statements were contradicted by the information provided by K.C., a friend of Kozák who had initially contacted the authorities about his statements to her, in her initial emergency call and the murder scene within the house. According to Lidové noviny, the circumstances of Kozák's father's death clearly indicated that he had been murdered, that police had information about Kozák's firearms possession, and that Matějček personally ordered a tactical unit to be present in the Staroměstské náměstí (Old Town Square) area before the attack commenced.

Moreover, on 26 June 2024, Seznam Zprávy published action reports filed by the policemen that had unsuccessfully searched for Kozák in the Faculty of Arts main building. Three policemen signed under first report wrote that they were searching for the perpetrator because he was "suspected of murdering his father", while the report of the other unit explicitly stated: "He was suspected of murdering his father while threatening suicide. Other information suggests that he is a mentally disturbed man who also possesses several weapons."

During the Parliamentary Security Committee hearing on 24 June 2024, Matějček further alleged that it was technically impossible for the police officers who entered the building at 13:30 to review the security camera footage at that time. The footage later revealed Kozák's entry just seven minutes before at 13:23. University officials labeled Matějček's statement as false, claiming that reviewing of previous footage can be done immediately, but that the police only asked for it hours after the attack. The university's information about the camera footage's availability was later confirmed by the spokesman of the Prague police directorate, Jan Daněk, who claimed it would've, in any case, not have been helpful, as Kozák was not facing the camera and had a different hairstyle compared to photo available to the police.

Matějček also repeated the statement that there was no initial information that Kozák might commit a murder, but later added that he had been considered a murder suspect in relation to his father's death. Matějček admitted that the police were aware that one of his firearms was of the type which was the focus of the Klánovice Forest murders investigation. He also stated that the police sent "everything they had" into the city centre of Prague.

Police issued a formal decision on the conclusion of the investigation in June 2024. Multiple injured victims, their relatives, as well as Charles University filed an appeal against the decision. The victims' relatives were especially outraged by the fact that police officers entered shortly after the perpetrator, but did not properly search the main building, did not order the evacuation of the students, and did not remain within the building. Matějček stated that the police officers "followed a hot lead", and therefore remaining in the main building would've been "counterproductive". Matejček further said if the building had been evacuated, the perpetrator would have become aware of it and "anything could have happened".

Several relatives of murdered students and journalists called for the resignation of Matějček, Interior Minister Rakušan, and Police President Martin Vondrášek. Matějček in particular was accused by the media of falsely implying that Central Bohemian Police did not provide correct information, and thus the Prague Police was not aware of the danger. On 27 June 2024, Echo24 daily accused Rakušan and Matějček of "covering evidence" and "undermining people's trust in the state". Rakušan reacted by stating that he only had information from public sources and that he hopes that the police "will explain any inconsistencies."

=== General Inspection of Security Forces ===
The General Inspection of Security Forces (GIBS), which is tasked with investigating crimes committed by Czech law enforcement, concluded its investigation at the beginning of June 2024. On 6 June 2024, GIBS Director Vít Hendrych informed members of the Parliamentary Security Committee that no crime was committed by any police officer in the case. Opposition members of the committee unsuccessfully requested the inspection's closing report. Hendrych stated that the full 50-page report is confidential and that even police will receive only a three-page summary, which was released on 9 July 2024. The media noted that the summary does not answer any of the pertinent questions, such as what exact information the police had while searching for the perpetrator, and especially why the police officers had left the main building before the attack commenced.

=== Parliamentary Inquiry Commission ===
Opposition party ANO repeatedly requested establishment of a Parliamentary Inquiry Commission, which would investigate conduct of the police in the case. The government repeatedly refused to do so, with the head of Parliamentary Security Committee, Pavel Žáček, stating that they have "full trust in the police and the state attorney's office". This, however, changed following the June 2024 formal conclusion of investigation and after the hearing of the Parliamentary Security Committee, with the Czech Pirate Party breaking ranks with the rest of the Government and announcing it would support the opposition's vote for the Inquiry Commission's establishment.

On 26 June 2024, the ANO's proposal for establishment of the commission was approved in a vote by the Chamber of Deputies of the Czech Republic. The commission has the power to procure documents, demand explanations and interview witnesses and, depending on the nature of the case, hire an expert and an interpreter.

== Aftermath ==
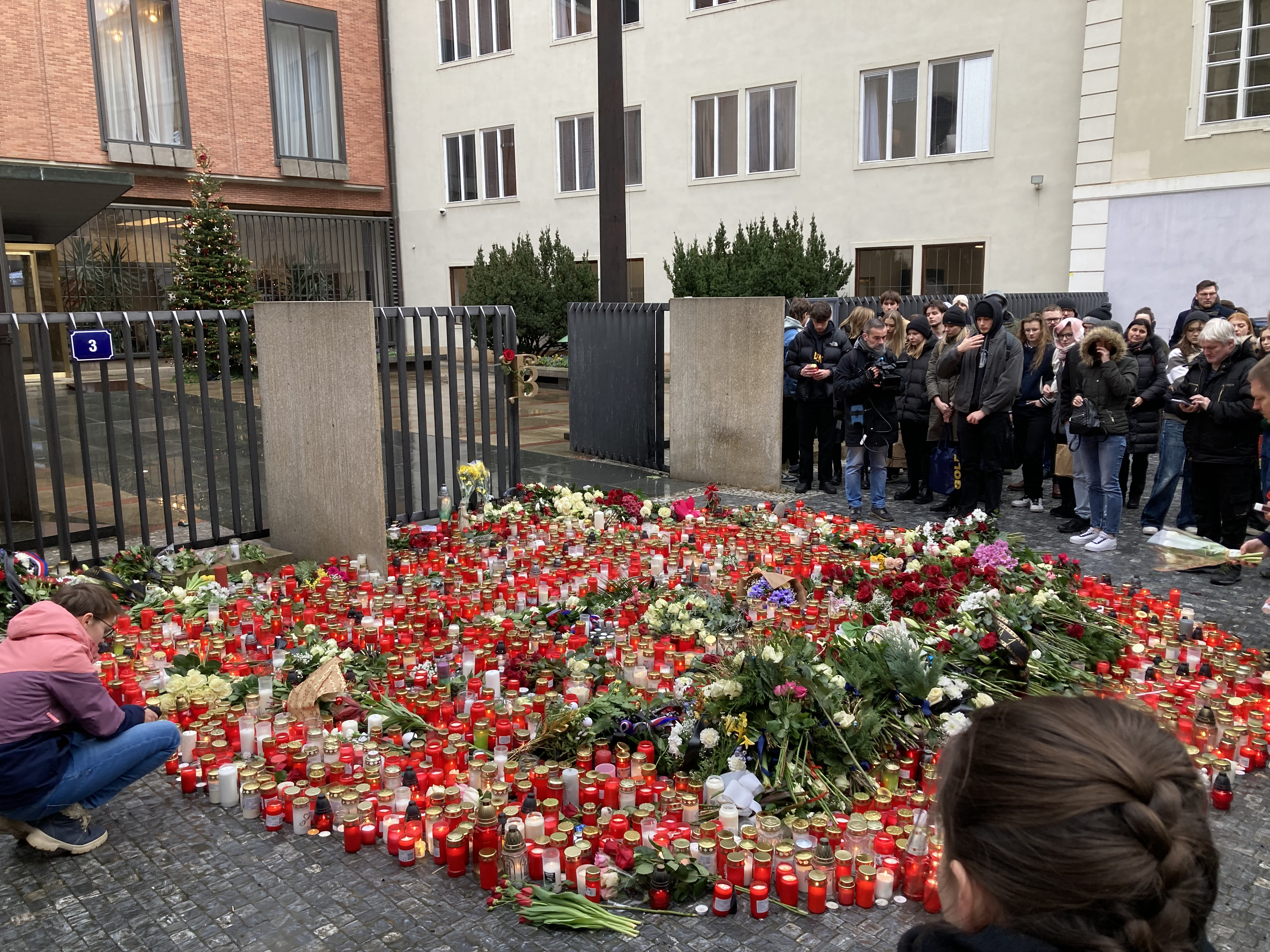
Place of remembrance next to Karolinum, the seat of the Charles University, the day after the attack

The evening after the attack, passersby lit candles and left flowers at the site of the attack. The Charles University Foundation and the community of Klánovice announced humanitarian online fundraisers to help those affected by the tragedy. The 2023–24 UEFA Women's Champions League football match between Slavia Prague and St. Pölten, set to be played at home in Prague on the day of the shooting, was postponed. Several other sports and cultural events were also called off, while Christmas markets across of the country were either closed or reduced operations on 23 December. Interior minister Vít Rakušan called on mayors across the country to cancel New Year's fireworks displays in light of the killings and urged citizens to mark the event peacefully out of respect for those traumatised by the shootings.

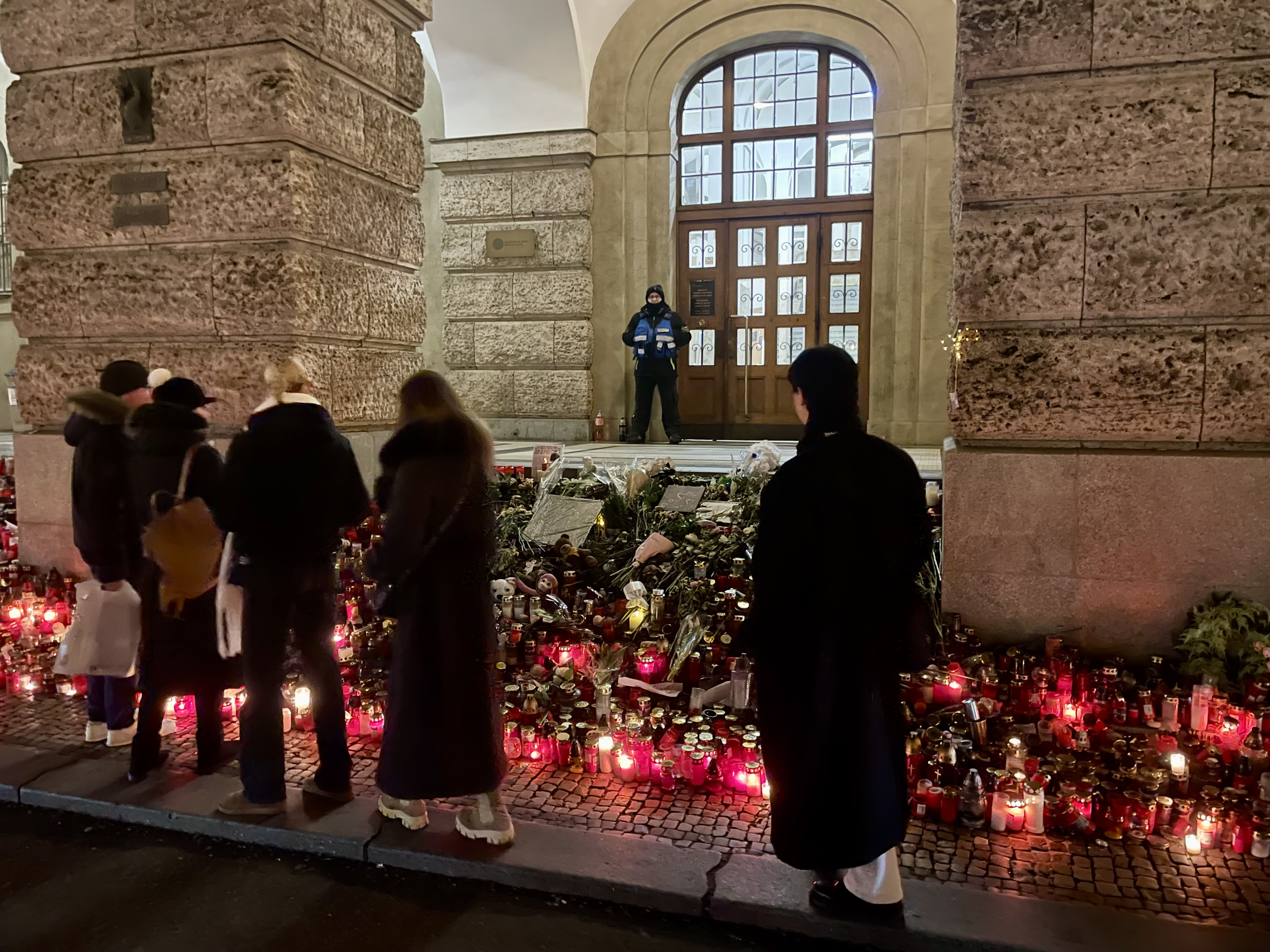
Candles of remembrance in front of the closed building of Faculty of Arts on Jan Palach Square, few weeks after the attack

Authorities responded to several false alarms about potential attacks following the incident, including two bomb-related hoaxes in Prague and Václav Havel Airport. In Slovakia, a 64-year-old man in Žilina was arrested by police after calling emergency services and saying that he intended to do "what happened in Prague" on the evening after the attack. He was subsequently charged with spreading general alarm.

At some point after the shootings, the perpetrator's house in Hostouň was broken into, and subsequently put under police guard.

On 4 January 2024, a march was held from the main building of Charles University to the Faculty of Arts main building to commemorate the victims of the shootings, after which students formed a human chain around the building in a symbolic embrace. A fire was also lit at Jan Palach Square as bells in nearby churches tolled for 14 minutes.

On 26 January 2024, the Chamber of Deputies passed a new firearms act, which had been in the making since 2017 and was formally publicly introduced in September 2022. The new act, which will become effective in 2026, includes several changes, such as requiring businesses to report suspicious purchases of firearms and ammunition to police, requiring gun owners to undergo a medical examination every five years (as opposed to ten years under the current laws), giving doctors access to databases to find out if their patients are gun owners, and expanding reasons for the preliminary seizure of firearms by police. The legislation passed unopposed in the lower house, and must be approved by the Senate and President Petr Pavel for it to become law.

On 14 June 2024, the Czech police closed the investigation. The report was first provided to the relatives of the victims, and later to the general public. Investigators concluded that the shooter was a lone assailant, that the attack was not planned to target anyone in particular, and that the motive was that he felt misunderstood by society and wanted to draw attention to himself.

On 20 June 2024, a memorial for the victims of the attack was installed in Jan Palach Square. It weighs approximately eight tons and is a three meters high piece of sandstone. The sculptre was designed by Vojtěch Adamec Jr. and placed down by architect Vojtěch Králíček.

On 12 April 2025, Lenka Šimůnková, the mother of one of the victims, Eliška Šimůnková, committed suicide by jumping into the Macocha Gorge. Šimůnková was the biggest critic of the police conduct in the case and had not come to terms with her daughter's death or the results of the investigation.

On 21 September 2025, a plaque with carved names of the victims was installed near the memorial for the victims of the attack in Jan Palach Square.

=== Copycat incidents ===
Following the shooting, police detained four people on suspicion of threatening to stage copycat attacks or expressing approval of the incident, while police presence in selected sites, including schools, were heightened until 1 January 2024.

In November 2024, an unidentified minor female student from South Moravia was sentenced to two years imprisonment for planning to murder three other students, and for expressing approval of the Prague attack. The student had first tried to gain access to firearms owned by her friends' family members, and after failing to do so, she opted to commit the attack with a kitchen knife. She was arrested on 1 January 2024, a day before she planned to commit the murders. Additionally, the court decided that after serving her prison term, the girl will be involuntarily committed into a mental institution. Her release would be conditional upon a new court decision, subject to an expert opinion that she no longer poses a threat to society.

In June 2025, an unnamed 24-year-old German woman was arrested at the Faculty of Arts main building as she was making a video celebrating the attack and its perpetrator. She was charged with publicly approving a criminal offence. On 13 June 2025, the woman was sentenced to three months of imprisonment, with the sentence being suspended for a probation period of two years; she was further prohibited from entering the Czech Republic for a period of five years.

== Perpetrator ==
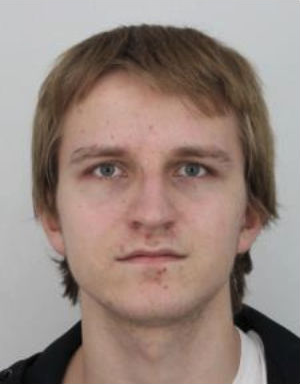
Photo of David Kozák, the perpetrator.

The perpetrator was identified as David Kozák (born 12 August 1999), a 24-year-old masters in world history student from Hostouň, 21 kilometers (13 mi) outside Prague, who had graduated with a bachelor's degree in History and European Studies from the Faculty of Arts. Kozák had successfully defended his bachelor's thesis, entitled The Problematics of the Antagonism of the Galician Peasant Revolt and the Kraków Uprising in the Year of 1846, at the Institute of World History, Faculty of Arts, Charles University, supervised by professor František Stellner. The thesis was defended with an excellent grade, with Kozák receiving the Marian Szyjkowski Award by the Polish Institute in Prague. Kozák also had no prior criminal record and had passed an enhanced background check by the Civil Aviation Authority as part of a hiring process for his job at the Václav Havel Airport.

=== Personal background ===
According to State Attorney Jana Murínová, Kozák had been watching videos with "bizarre violence and bizarre pornography", particularly Asian films in which the actresses were made to look like zombies or corpses.

Kozák's father was generally considered to be a very gentle, kind, and helpful person, while his mother had been the authoritative figure in the family. According to the psychologist, Kozák's parents did not provide effective emotional support for their son, and that family conflicts had played a role in the development of the perpetrator's suicide tendencies. Classmates testified that Kozák had described being under stress due to his parents pressuring him to finish his bachelor's degree early. He also described being punished for failing to do household chores and having little sleep, eating lightly and drinking only green tea. His mother contradicted these testimonies, claiming that her son was a calm and happy boy and that the family functioned well, adding that she did not understand his actions.

Kozák was unable to establish romantic relationships, with unsuccessful attempts to find a girlfriend during high school. His feelings of loneliness deepened when he started studying at Charles University, particularly during the COVID-19 restrictions. A survivor of the attack testified that the perpetrator had said, "You don't talk to me much. You don't communicate with me much," while murdering his victims.

Interior Minister Vít Rakušan said the authorities did not suspect any ideological or extremist links. On 26 April 2024, Murínová stated during a public hearing of the Parliamentary Security Committee that the perpetrator was not suffering from a mental disorder.

A Telegram account attributed to him contained writings in fluent Russian that praised two school shooters from Russia, namely Ilnaz Galyaviev and Alina Afanaskina, and described suicidal tendencies. This information was shared by Czech media but was not officially confirmed by police. A Russia correspondent at Czech Radio suggested the Telegram account was likely fake, as one post was edited after the shooter's death and the posts were written "in the language of a young native Russian speaker". Police made no definitive conclusion regarding the Telegram account, citing refusal of Russian authorities to cooperate in the case.

=== Mental state ===
"At least in the last year of his life, David Kozák was characterised by a long-lasting and strong incitement to murderous activity. The correlation of the homicidal urges were the feelings of injustice, resentment and hatred. By the end of 2022, he showed an association between suicidal and homicidal ideation."
Psychologist's expert opinion (post mortem)

Czech Police Chief Martin Vondrášek said that Kozák had a gun license and owned eight firearms, which he obtained as part of his plan to commit a mass murder. As a European Union member state, the Czech Republic adheres to the European Firearms Directive and legal accessibility of firearms is comparable to other EU countries. In 2021, a constitutional amendment to the country's Charter of Fundamental Rights and Freedoms codified the citizens' right to defend themselves or others with a weapon. To legally possess a firearm in the Czech Republic, a person must first obtain a firearms license, which requires, among other things, a medical examination. A bill of health is issued by the general practitioner, who can also request a review of the applicant's mental state.

One of Kozák's friends, who has been named only as K.C. by the media, became worried about his mental state in the summer of 2022. Due to her intervention, Kozák underwent four visits with a psychiatrist between September and November 2022. Here, he first disclosed suicidal thoughts, but during the visits, he progressed towards murderous ideas aimed at his parents as well as other unassuming people. The psychiatrist advised Kozák to visit a psychologist, which he did only once in December 2022.

Psychiatrists in the Czech Republic have a legal duty to send their medical reports to the patient's general practitioner, "if the practitioner is known to them". As Kozák did not disclose the name of his general practitioner, no report was sent. Lidové noviny, however, cited several psychiatrists, according to whom it was easy to find information about a patient's general practitioner, claiming that it took "only three clicks" through an online communication channel with the patient's insurance provider. The Czech Medical Association confirmed that a psychiatrist may learn about the general practitioner through this method; however there is no legal requirement to do so. Due to the absence of his general practitioner, Kozák's medical clearance was issued by a substitute doctor, a graduate of Guangdong Medical University who specialized in Chinese medicine. The police asked the Czech Medical Association to review whether a substitute doctor may issue a medical clearance instead of the general practitioner, as required by law.

Kozák's general practitioner could have learned about his psychiatric visits from an online database of the patient's medical prescriptions. However, reviewing this information is not obligatory, and the general practitioner that issued the bill of health failed to do so. The only information in the bill of health for the gun license was that Kozák had to wear glasses when using firearms.

According to a police-ordered post-mortem psychological evaluation, Kozák had a personality that was "schizoid with narcissistic and dissociative traits and a very solid IQ", but did not suffer from any particular mental disorder.

In September 2024, the vice-chairman of the Parliamentary Defense Committee Pavel Růžička, together with the Minister of Defense Jana Černochová and other deputies, lodged a proposal to amend the Firearms Act to remedy the errors in the process of health clearance which were uncovered during the investigation.

=== Planning of the attack ===
Police concluded that the perpetrator had been planning to conduct a mass murder for a long time. He researched information about murderers, including the Forest Killer, the Spartakiad Killer, and Anders Behring Breivik.

From the beginning of 2023, Kozák gradually started to identify with Keiji Kiriya, a character in the Japanese science fiction light novel All You Need Is Kill, which had previously been the topic of an essay he wrote in high school. In September 2023, he limited his planning to the university and its vicinity. He researched teaching schedules of the fourth-floor classrooms and downloaded floor plans of the buildings on Jan Palach Square and Celetná Street. Kozák also made notes of the probable number of students in each of the classrooms and researched public events at the nearby Rudolfinum, Jan Palach Square, and other locations within the Prague Old Town.

Kozák received a gift of CZK 300,000 (approximately US$13,000) from his grandmother and liquidated CZK 400,000 (US$17,000) from a long-term savings account. This money, as well as income from his airport job, was used towards the purchase of firearms and ammunition.

Kozák had told several friends about his gun purchases. He shared most information with K.C., whom he also informed about taking shooting courses. On 3 November 2023, Kozák told K.C. that he started exercising, as he would have to carry heavy bags in a month or two. Kozák wrote further messages to K.C. on 6 December 2023, which, in hindsight, according to the investigators, showed clear determination to commit a murder.

== Reactions ==
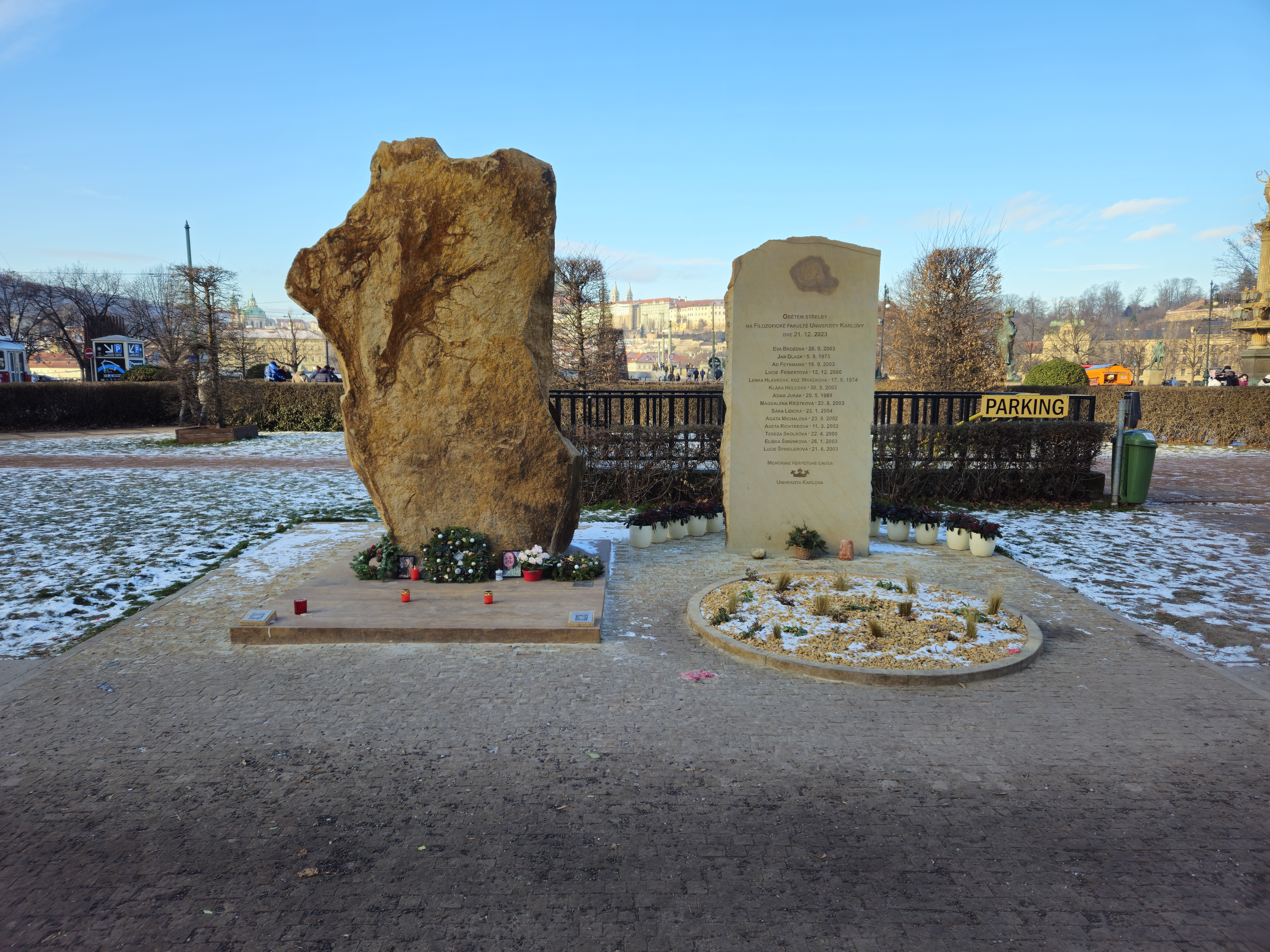
Memorial to the shooting on Jan Palach Square

=== Domestic ===
During a vigil at Charles University on 22 December, its rector, Milena Králíčková, said, "The academic community is shaken, deeply shaken." Prime Minister Petr Fiala cancelled his scheduled events in Olomouc and travelled to Prague shortly after the shooting. President Petr Pavel expressed his "sincere condolences" to the family and friends of the victims via social media, while also cutting short a trip to France.

Fiala later announced a day of mourning for 23 December, with flags flying at half-mast and a minute of silence held at noon, along with the ringing of bells for the victims. A mass for the victims was also held that day at Saint Vitus Cathedral, which was attended by Pavel, Senate president Miloš Vystrčil, and Chamber of Deputies President Markéta Pekarová Adamová. The service was officiated by Jan Graubner, the Roman Catholic Archbishop of Prague, who expressed shock at the incident and expressed the "need to clearly condemn what happened" while also looking into the future. University rector Milena Králíčková also said during the event that "Nobody should be left alone in these tough moments." Religious services for the victims were also held in other parts of the country.

In a social media post, SPD MP Jiří Kobza blamed the "inclusive progressive school system" at the Faculty of Arts for creating the shooter. The post was later deleted. The Czech Rectors Conference called Kobza's post "absolutely shocking, crossing the boundaries of decency, morality, good manners, but also the boundaries of humanity." Charles University announced it would file a criminal complaint against Kobza. On 9 January 2024, Kobza apologized on social media, claiming he was under emotions at the time of his initial post. Charles University called his apology "unsatisfactory".

=== International ===
Many international leaders expressed condolences, including European Commission president Ursula von der Leyen, United States president Joe Biden, Ukrainian president Volodymyr Zelenskyy, Canadian prime minister Justin Trudeau, Israeli president Isaac Herzog, Slovak president Zuzana Čaputová and prime minister Robert Fico, German chancellor Olaf Scholz, Hungarian prime minister Viktor Orbán, French president Emmanuel Macron, Finnish president Sauli Niinistö, Pope Francis, and Taiwanese president Tsai Ing-wen.

== See also ==
- Měděnec arson attack, a 1984 mass murder, deadliest in Czechia's post WW2 history
- Žďár nad Sázavou school stabbing, a 2014 Czech mass stabbing at a secondary school
- Uherský Brod shooting, a 2015 mass shooting
- Ostrava hospital attack, a 2019 Czech mass shooting
- Bohumín arson attack, a 2020 mass murder which had been the deadliest in the Czech Republic prior to this incident
- Virginia Tech shooting, another university shooting that involved the perpetrator using 9mm and .22 caliber pistols inside of the building.
- 2023 University of Nevada, Las Vegas shooting, another university shooting that took place in December 2023.
