= Lenka Hlávková =

Czech musicologist (1974–2023)

- Born: Lenka Mráčková; 17 August 1974; Louny, Czechoslovakia
- Died: 21 December 2023 (aged 49); Prague, Czech Republic
- Occupation: Musicologist

Lenka Hlávková (née Mráčková; 17 August 1974 – 21 December 2023) was a Czech musicologist. She served as head of the Institute of Musicology of Faculty of Arts, Charles University from 2012 to 2015 and again from 2021 until being fatally shot in the 2023 Prague shootings.

== Life ==
Hlávková studied musicology at the Faculty of Arts, Charles University in Prague. She finished her master's studies in 1998, and in 2004 she received her Ph.D. During her studies, she completed internships abroad, including a doctoral internship at the Humboldt University of Berlin from 1999–2000.

== Career ==
Hlávková worked as an assistant professor at the Institute of Musicology at the Faculty of Arts of Charles University, where from 2012 to 2015 she was director, then deputy director, and then from December 2021, director of the institute again. She participated in various research projects and was the author of several professional articles. She had been a member of the European Academy of Sciences and Arts since 2019. She specialized in Renaissance music, the musical culture of Central Europe in the Late Middle Ages, and researched Czech music of the 15th and 16th century. She also worked to relate musical traditions within the context of the Hussite and post-Hussite time periods for contemporary listeners and experts.

== Death ==
Hlávková was a fatality of the Prague mass shooting at the Faculty of Arts of Charles University on 21 December 2023. Hlávková was apparently on her way out of her office on the fourth floor when the shooting started, as an Advent concert was also starting in the faculty building, in which thirteen more people were also killed. She was 49.
