= Vilém Prusinovský z Víckova =

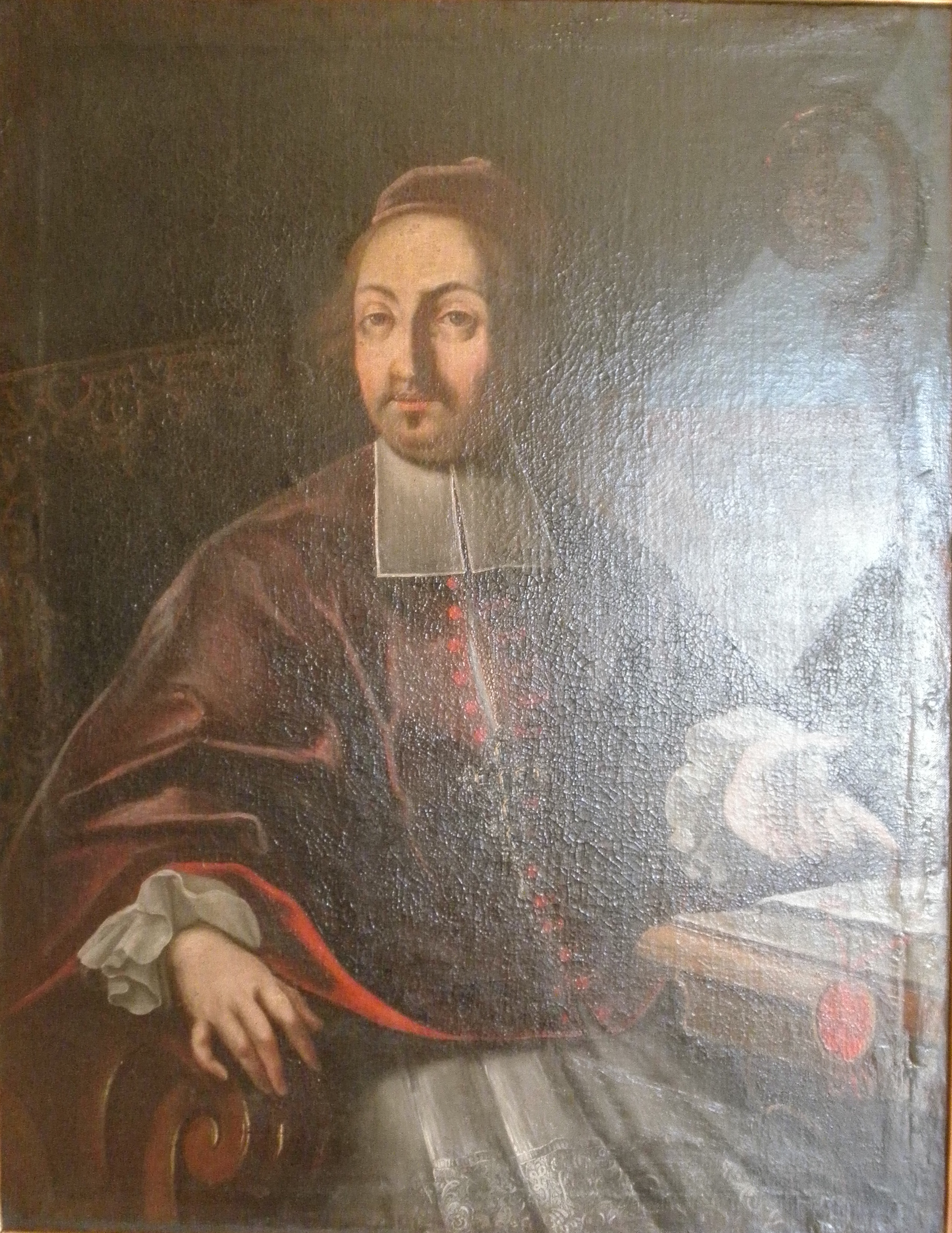
Portrait of Vilém Prusinovský z Víckova. Oil on canvas by a Moravian painter from the first half of the 18th century.

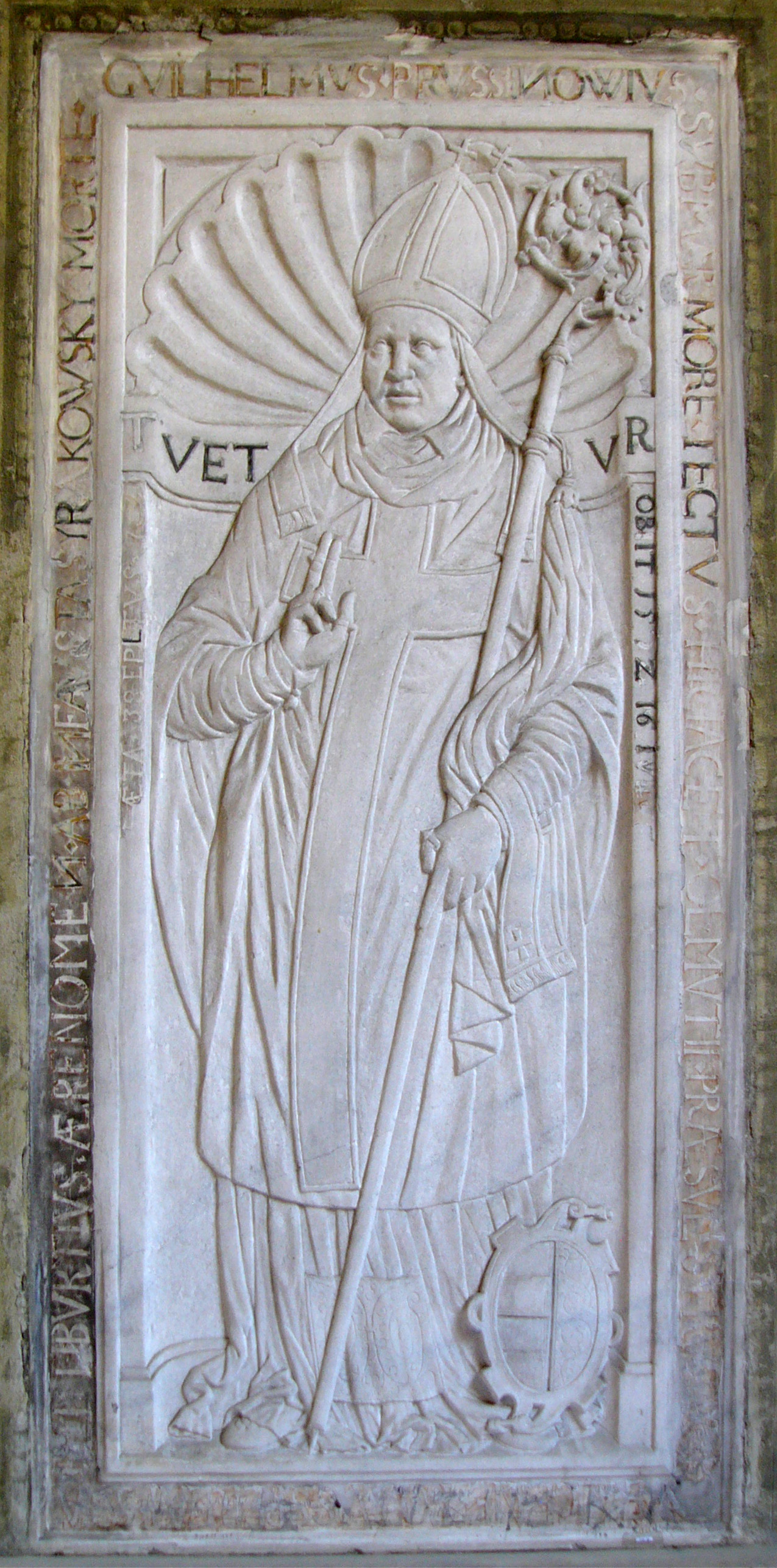
tombstone of Vilém Prusinovský in The Church of the Virgin Mary of the Snow in Olomouc

Vilém Prusinovský z Víckova (in German: William Prusinowsky von Wiczkov) (1534 – June 16, 1572) was a bishop of Olomouc in 1565–1572. He started his office in the times of Catholic-Protestant controversy and followed the policy of the Council of Trent. He forced the Utraquists to accept his authority. He invited Jesuits to Olomouc and a year after his death, in 1573, his plan of promotion of the Olomouc school to Jesuit Academy was realized and the second oldest university in the Czech lands was established. It is possible he was poisoned by Jan Philopon Dambrovský.

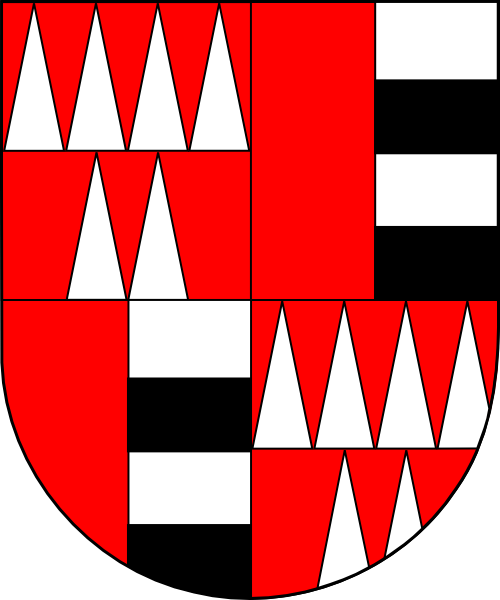
Coat of arms of Vilém Prusinovský z Víckova
