= Uherský Brod shooting =

2015 shooting in the Czech Republic

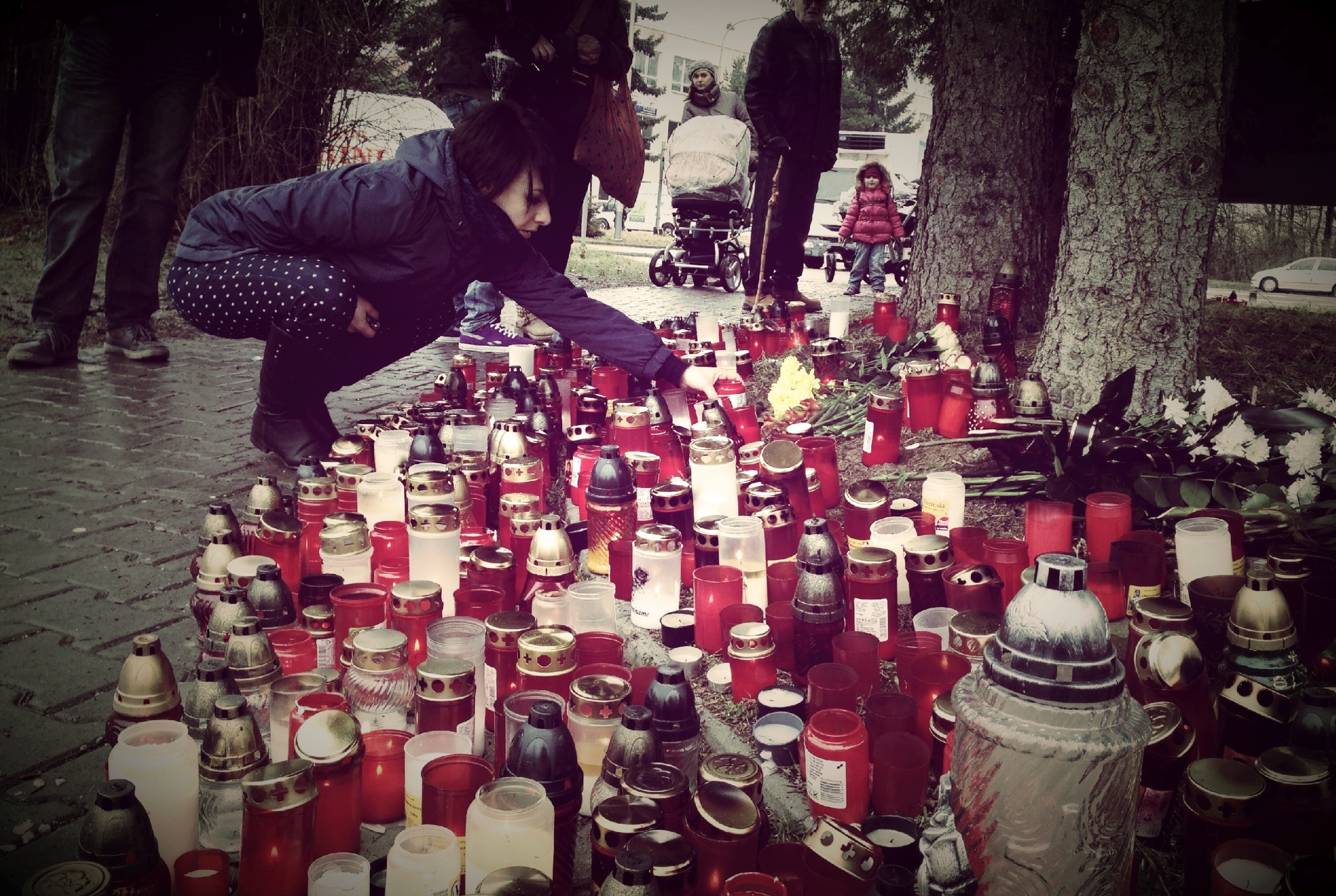
- Commemoration of the shooting

- Location: 49.0200°N 17.6492°E; Družba restaurant, Uherský Brod, Zlín Region, Czech Republic
- Date: 24 February 2015 c. 12:30 p.m. – 14:23 p.m.
- Attack type: Mass shooting, murder–suicide
- Weapons: CZ 75B pistol; Alfa 820 revolver
- Deaths: 9 (including the perpetrator)
- Injuries: 1
- Perpetrator: Zdeněk Kovář

The Uherský Brod shooting occurred on 24 February 2015 at the Družba restaurant in the town of Uherský Brod, Czech Republic. Nine people were killed, including the gunman, 63-year-old Zdeněk Kovář, who committed suicide after a standoff with police that lasted nearly two hours. In addition, one other person was injured. Uherský Brod is 260 kilometers (160 miles) east-southeast of the Czech capital Prague.

Prior to the 2020 Bohumín arson attack and the 2023 Prague shooting, the shooting was one of the two deadliest mass murders in the country's modern peacetime history, alongside a 1973 vehicular rampage committed by Olga Hepnarová. The circumstances of the shooting led to an examination of gun politics in the Czech Republic and police rules of engagement against active shooters. Czech media speculated that the rampage may have been triggered by an apparent attempt of the authorities to review Kovář's mental state.

== Background ==
Due to similarities between the perpetrators, the shooting was compared by Czech media and experts to an explosion that took place two years before in Frenštát pod Radhoštěm, another Moravian town lying 90 km northwards.

Before the shooting, Kovář's family became worried about his mental state to the point that they contacted authorities in connection with his possession of a gun license. Five days before the shooting, Kovář had received a police request to present a new health clearance under the threat of revoking his license. Before entering the Družba restaurant, Kovář visited at least two other venues. Those, however, had fewer customers, and Kovář left them immediately after entering.

== Shooting ==
Kovář entered the Družba building at about 12:30 pm, the restaurant's busiest daylight time. Around 20 people were in the small restaurant at the time. Before he entered the restaurant itself, which was situated on the first floor, Petr Gabriel, who was rushing to the bathroom, got ahead of Kovář on stairs leading to an upper floor.

Armed with a CZ 75B semi-automatic pistol, which is manufactured in the town, and an Alfa 820 revolver, Kovář opened fire without any warning immediately after entering the restaurant, shooting his victims directly in the head. Eight died immediately or soon afterwards. One female victim, who was shot twice in the chest, managed to leave the restaurant, while Gabriel remained hidden in the restaurant's bathroom. Eight other people escaped the building through the back door. Another customer, Jiří Nesázel, who took cover under a table, used a moment in which Kovář was reloading, and threw a chair at him, hitting him on the neck. This gave him an opportunity to run out through the front door with two other people.

Authorities received the first distress call from a person who escaped from the restaurant at 12:38 pm, and the first police car reached the building at 12:47 pm. The policemen were armed with the standard equipment for Czech police officers: holstered pistols (mostly with variants of CZ 75 that was also used by Kovář), body armor, and a select-fire rifle stored in their cars. The first two officers to arrive immediately entered the building with body armor on and guns drawn. Kovář, taking cover behind a bar opposite to the door, opened fire on the officers as soon as they entered. The police noted people lying on the ground and sitting on chairs between them and Kovář. Not knowing the status of the civilians, the police decided not to return fire, covered the exits, and waited for the arrival of a tactical unit. By this time, other police units as well as the first ambulance car had arrived, taking away the wounded female victim who had escaped.

At 12:56 pm, Kovář called a Prima TV station crime news reporter, claiming that he was being harassed by multiple people and that he had hostages whom he threatened to kill. The journalist who spoke to Kovář called the police, who were already sending all available units to the location.

A police negotiator contacted Kovář by phone at 13:07. During negotiations, Kovář claimed to have hostages, although all of the people remaining inside were most likely already dead (apart from Gabriel, who was hiding in the bathroom, unbeknownst to Kovář). The hostage claim delayed police entry into the building. Kovář stopped communicating at about 14:00 p.m. After attempts to contact him failed, the tactical team breached the building at 14:23 p.m. Upon the team's entry, Kovář immediately shot himself dead.

Apart from stun grenades, the policemen did not fire a single shot. After securing the restaurant, the police let in a large number of medical personnel. The only person alive who remained inside the building was Gabriel, who had been hiding in the bathroom for the entire duration of the incident.

== Victims ==
A total of eight people, excluding the gunman, died in the rampage. This included seven men, aged 27 to 66, and one woman, aged 47. Another woman, aged 37, survived despite being shot twice in the chest.

== Perpetrator ==
Zdeněk Kovář (c. 1951 – 24 February 2015) was 63 years old at the time of his death and lived with his wife in a house not far from the scene of the shooting. Neighbours described the couple as deranged and known for loudness and verbal abuse. Kovář was the son of a worker in the local Česká zbrojovka Uherský Brod (ČZUB) firearms factory, the largest small arms manufacturer in the country. Formerly an electrician, he had been unemployed for at least ten years. Kovář's wife was taken to a psychiatric hospital following the shooting.

Kovář had held a gun license since 2000, and legally owned both of the guns he used.

== Aftermath ==
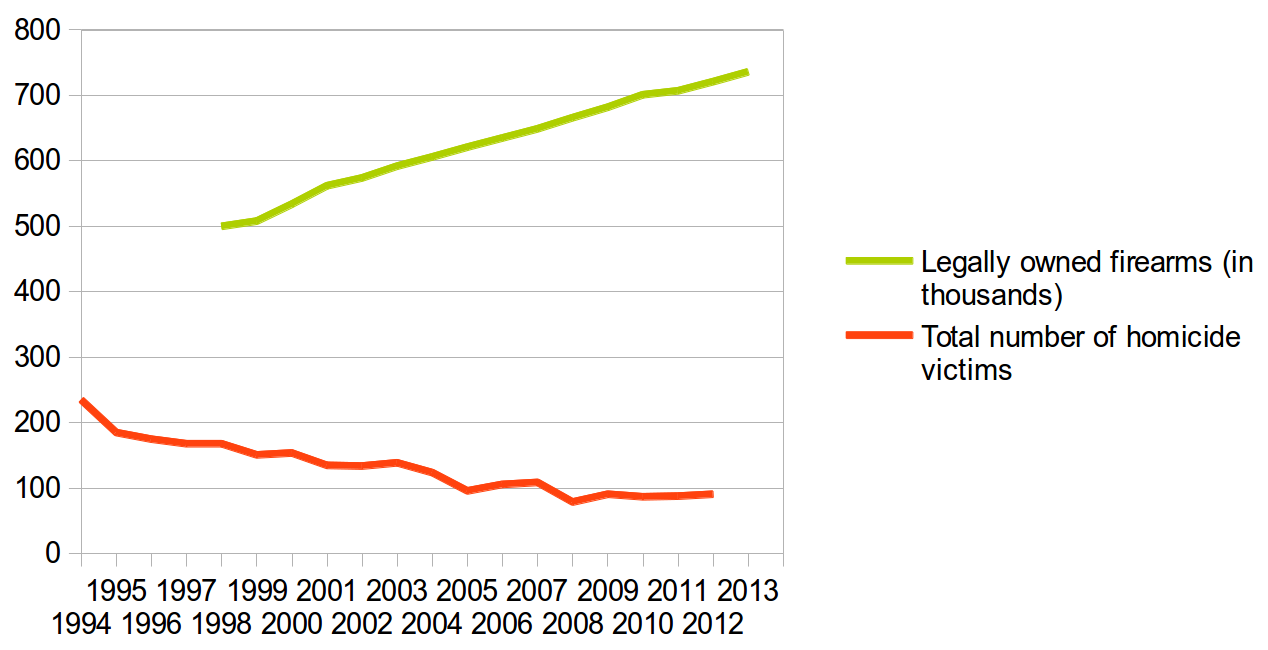
Number of legally owned firearms in the Czech Republic (in thousands) and total number of victims of intentional homicide by any object

As more information about Kovář's notoriety among neighbors surfaced, focus of investigation shifted towards the circumstances under which he gained and retained a gun license and firearms. In order to be granted a gun license in the Czech Republic, a person must pass a qualification exam, receive a health clearance by a general practitioner, who may require a further examination by a specialist, such as a psychological or psychiatric evaluation, and must pass a background check. According to Section 23 of the Czech Firearms Act, an applicant may not be granted a license if they have committed more than one misdemeanor against public order in the previous three years. Similarly, the law further makes a gun license inaccessible to people with mental illnesses. The license must be renewed every five years (every ten years for licenses issued after 1 July 2014). The renewal requires the presentation of a new health clearance, while the police conduct a new background check. Kovář's license was renewed in January 2015.

=== Misdemeanors registry ===
Kovář applied for a gun license renewal in accordance with the law. According to Kovář's brother-in-law, neighbors, and a local policeman who had repeated contacts with him, Kovář and his wife had committed misdemeanors against public order. The municipality of Uherský Brod, which deals with such misdemeanors, did not register them and thus Kovář had an apparently clean history. In turn, this satisfied the requirements and he had his license renewed.

The renewal of his license was due to the fact that while there is a central registry of crimes and of traffic misdemeanors, no such registry exists for other misdemeanors in the Czech Republic. In the case where a non-traffic misdemeanor is solved on the spot (e.g. fining by a policeman), no record of it is made. Only when the investigated person or the police refuse to deal with the misdemeanor on the spot, is an administrative proceeding before a municipal misdemeanor committee initiated and if convicted, then a record of it is made by the municipality.

The Czech government had made a decision to introduce a central registry for all misdemeanors in October 2014, planning to have the system working within two years. As police are obliged to revoke a gun license when the licensee has committed more than one misdemeanor against public order in a period of three years, the central registry of misdemeanors might have allowed police to effectively revoke the license long before the shooting.

=== Health clearance ===
We cannot foresee the outcome, but it is most probable that the [ordered health clearance reevaluation] would lead to revocation of [Kovář's] license.

— Milan Chovanec, Minister of Interior

At any time, the police may order a new health clearance inspection if they have a reasonable concern that the person is not healthy enough to continue holding their license.

According to the Uherský Brod mayor Patrik Kunčar, Kovář's family members tried to prevent him from having the license renewed by pleading with his general practitioner not to grant him the necessary health clearance, since they felt threatened and considered him mentally unstable. Nevertheless, Kovář received clearance from his general practitioner and presented it as a part of his license renewal application on 19 January 2015.

After renewing the license in January, the police were contacted by an unspecified person who reported to them on Kovář's mental state. The police subsequently contacted Kovář's general practitioner and psychiatrist, and on 17 February 2015 ordered a health reevaluation. He received the letter on 19 February 2015, five days before the shooting. Under the law, Kovář was obliged to present a new health clearance within a month or lose the license. Czech media has speculated that the apparent attempt of the authorities to review Kovář's mental state may have triggered the rampage.

A few days after the shooting, the Ministry of Interior announced its deliberation about making the gun license registry accessible to psychiatrists in order to give them the ability to report to police possible changes of mental state of their patients having an impact on their eligibility to possess firearms. This was, however, rejected by psychiatric associations. They argued that psychiatrists' main goal is to cure patients, and that potential patients may be more likely to avoid psychiatric treatment for fear of losing their gun license.

=== Police response ===
Active shooter engagement rules of the Czech police

Police were criticized for acting in contradiction with their own rules of active shooter engagement which, inter alia, include the following:

- active shooter's aim is to kill the largest number of people possible before being stopped by police or committing suicide
- on average, attacks last 13 minutes
- in an unknown building, police shall act as fast as possible to find and neutralize all shooters, thus preventing death and injury of other people
- police must react fast, immediate elimination of the active attacker must be the absolute priority in order to prevent his further actions; generally, tactical teams engage only as a second wave

One of the main topics of debate after Kovář's rampage became the way police dealt with him, especially whether the first two responding officers were, under the circumstances, supposed to immediately engage and neutralize Kovář, and whether the decision to wait for the arrival of the tactical unit was sound. The debate became more vocal after a cook, who managed to escape the rampage, claimed that she heard a slow series of single shots coming from the restaurant after the police had retreated. Another witness, who escaped unharmed, refuted this version of events, saying that shots were fired only during the initial ten minutes leading up to the point of police entry, with no shots heard thereafter.

Police said the first responders decided not to engage because they saw civilians lying and sitting in the line of fire between them and Kovář; they didn't know their status, and Kovář had taken cover behind a bar with only his head and hand holding the pistol visible. According to the Chief of the Zlín Regional Police Department, Jaromír Tkadleček, the Uherský Brod district units present had enough manpower and equipment, including select-fire rifles, to engage Kovář. However, they decided to withdraw due to Kovář's claim of having hostages and stated intent to negotiate their release.

Apart from local units, a special ordnance unit was called in from its regional headquarters in Zlín. It arrived about 30 minutes later. Because there are eight tactical teams covering fourteen Czech regions and none in Zlín, a tactical team from Brno was called in. The team's fifteen members reached the restaurant by cars in 66 minutes, opting not to use their helicopter that has a capacity of six. Furthermore, the elite police tactical unit URNA was called from Prague but its helicopters arrived after the end of the standoff. According to Tkadleček, even if URNA had its headquarters directly in Uherský Brod, it would not have changed anything about the timing nor the manner in which the police engaged Kovář.

Zlín region politicians announced they would call for the establishment of a local tactical team. Meanwhile, the Minister of Interior commented that the police were already in the process of hiring 4,000 new officers (about 10% of its total manpower), thus reversing cuts enacted by previous governments. Experts further pointed out the necessity to provide more CQB training to policemen in small municipalities and at rural areas. This type of training had until that point been largely aimed and directed at police officers in large towns.

On 10 March 2015, weekly newspaper Respekt published more details of the police engagement. By chance, an emergency motorized police unit, which usually serves as immediate reinforcement to police officers in the field, was conducting exercises not far from Uherský Brod. The unit arrived within twenty minutes of the first emergency call. Heavily armed and well trained, their officer in charge gave order to immediately engage Kovář. Within a minute, the local police station chief arrived and ordered them to stand down, began securing the perimeter, gathering information, and preparing an engagement plan. Meanwhile, Kovář called the emergency line 158 and mentioned he had five unharmed hostages and was demanding the presence of TV Prima. The officer in charge ordered the policemen to stand down just as they were about to enter the building in order to start negotiating. At that time, he could not have been aware of the status of victims inside. Fifteen minutes later, the Zlín region police chief arrived. In total, the command over the operation was passed between five people within the initial 40 minutes.

The fact that the police rules allow passing of command during engagement had been condemned a week earlier by Member of Parliament Stanislav Huml, who pointed out the Czech firemen's rules, according to which the first person in charge at the place of engagement remains in charge even if a general happens to come to join an operation afterwards. He noted that the passing of command requires briefing which not only leads to loss of time, but often also to subsequent mistakes.

As of May 2015, the only direct outcome of the inquiry into the police response to the shooting was the lowering of wage of a dispatch officer, who advised the policemen over the radio not to engage "so that nothing worse happens".

In June 2015, two members of the Security Committee of the Czech Parliament visited Uherský Brod and talked to multiple witnesses. The MPs issued a report condemning handling of the situation by the police. Among other issues, the MPs criticized that policemen parked their cars and put bullet proof vests on within the shooting range of Kovář, initially failed to get information from the witnesses and only later during the intervention attempted to contact them, and didn't cover the back exit, thus potentially allowing Kovář to escape from the building and jeopardize other people. The police had also let a helicopter land within the shooting range of Kovář. According to MPs, the police left much to be desired in regards to communication and most importantly, they wrongly decided to believe Kovář's claim of having hostages even though the witnesses could have readily confirmed that everyone inside was most likely dead. The policemen didn't seal the vicinity of the attack until 1 pm and used civilian phones in communication with superior officers instead of using either their own phones or radio transmitters. Minister of Interior Milan Chovanec commented that the MPs failed to interview the policemen and thus didn't get all the relevant information.

=== Gun politics ===
The statistics from other countries are quite clear. Curbing of access to legal firearms doesn't lead to less crime, but on the contrary. An expert debate on the topic may be useful especially due to some efforts of the European Union for absurd regulation of legal firearms possession. The Czech gun laws may serve as a model for some other European countries.

— Roman Váňa, Chairman of the Parliamentary Security Committee

In one of the first reactions on the day of the shooting, before knowing whether Kovář possessed the guns he used legally, Minister of Interior Chovanec stated that it was up for debate whether "[the society] wants to have so many gun license holders".

Support for Chovanec's comments was largely among members of parliament elected for the Communist Party. Others accused Chovanec of abusing the tragedy for his own political benefit. Some members of parliament, such as Miroslav Antl, Chairman of the Senate Constitutional Committee, commented that the licensing process is thorough enough, and pointed out that he considers carrying a concealed firearm to be a necessity due to a variety of reasons, especially during a time of rising threats of Islamic terrorist attacks. Roman Váňa, Chairman of the Parliamentary Security Committee and member of Chovanec's own Social Democratic party, refused Chovanec's argument, while some other members of parliament went in the opposite direction, claiming that there are too few armed people among the Czech population, since a single armed civilian might have stopped Kovář's assault. This sentiment was echoed by Martin Koller, a former ambassador to Kuwait and Iraq, who said that an armed attacker may be stopped only by armed force, and who pointed out the Charlie Hebdo shooting, stating that the attack might have ended quite differently had the victims been armed.

MF Dnes pointed out that despite the steady rise of firearm ownership in the country since abolition of restrictive communist legislation after the Velvet Revolution, the number of intentional homicide victims has been steadily falling since its peak in 1994.

During a press conference on 26 February 2015, Chovanec introduced five areas that were to be scrutinized in connection with the Uherský Brod attack: the communication of national police with municipal authorities, possible changes in crisis plans, operational range of tactical teams, and enhanced training of policemen. Chovanec didn't repeat his sentiment regarding the number of gun license holders, and instead specified that one of the issues to be analyzed will be the issuing and revocation of licenses under the existing legislation.

== Reactions ==
We are too benevolent to madmen. We let them out of psychiatric detention too early and then [a knife attack in] Žďár nad Sázavou happens, or we don't lock them in and then [the shooting in] Uherský Brod happens. That is where I see the basis of the problem.

— Miloš Zeman, President of the Czech Republic

Czech Minister of Interior Milan Chovanec said on Twitter that the shooting was not a terrorist incident but the actions of a "crazed individual".

Czech Prime Minister Bohuslav Sobotka, who was on a trip to South Korea at the time, said in a statement, "I am shocked by the tragic attack that happened today in Uherský Brod. I would like to express my deepest sorrow and condolences to the families and relatives of the victims." Uherský Brod mayor Patrik Kunčar also said, "I'm shaken to the core by this incident. I could not have dreamed something like this could happen here, in a restaurant that I'm so familiar with."

The day after the shooting, hundreds of people gathered in front of the Družba restaurant and lit candles to honor the victims.

== See also ==
- Harok family murder, another mass murder in the Czech Republic
- 2023 Prague shooting, worst mass shooting in the Czech Republic since Czechoslovakia's dissolution
