= Bohumín arson attack =

Arson attack in the Czech Republic

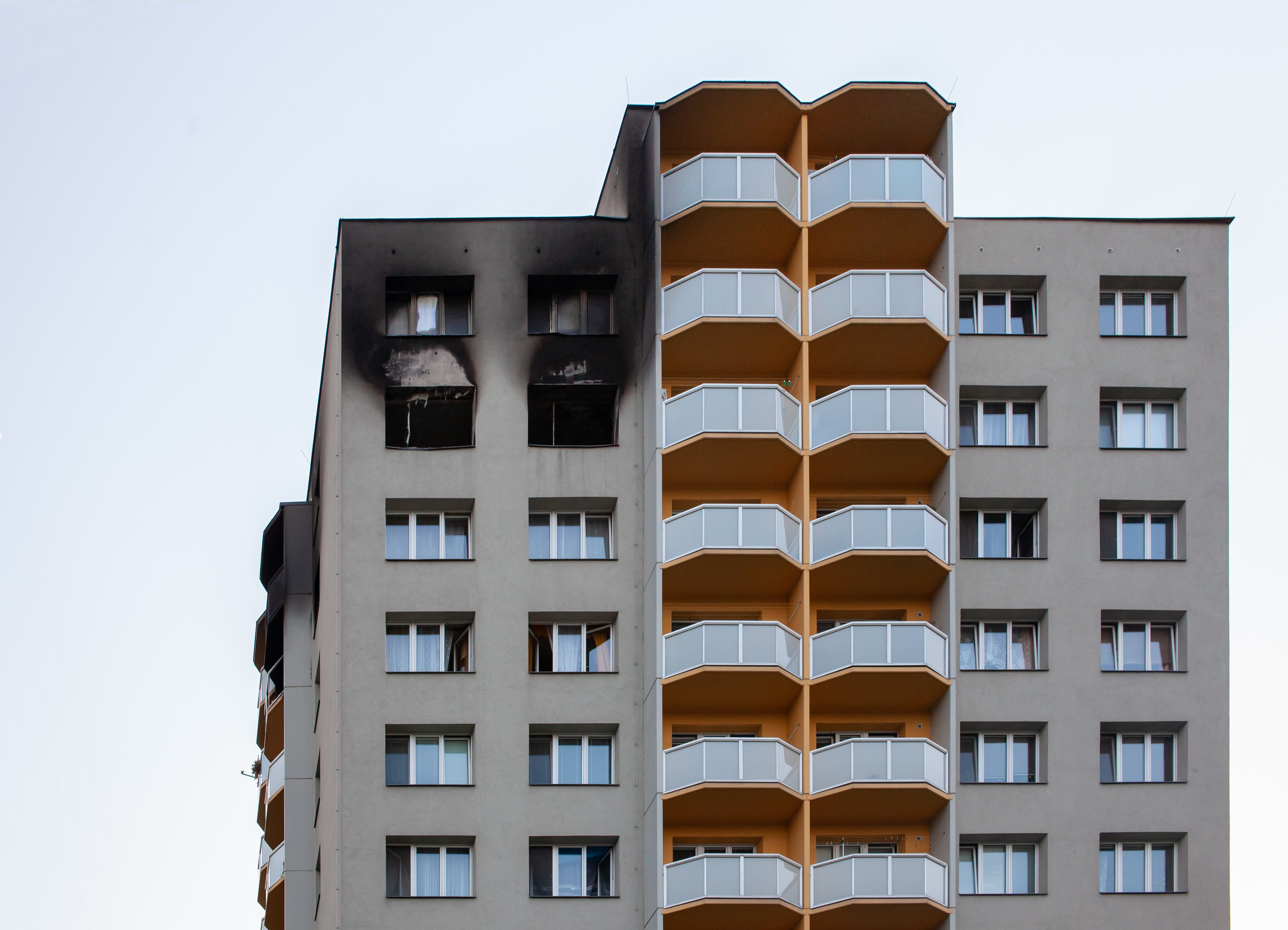
- View of the top part of the attacked building (11 August 2020)
- Location: 49°54′28″N 18°21′07″E; Nerudova Street, Bohumín, Czech Republic
- Date: 8 August 2020 c. 5:45 p.m.
- Attack type: Familicide, mass murder, arson
- Weapon: Gasoline (8 liters)
- Deaths: 11
- Injuries: 15
- Perpetrator: Zdeněk Konopka
- Verdict: Guilty; sentenced to life imprisonment

The Bohumín arson attack took place on 8 August 2020 at an apartment building on Nerudova Street in the town of Bohumín, north-eastern Czech Republic. Eleven people were killed and fifteen were injured. Police arrested 54-year-old arsonist Zdeněk Konopka in front of the building. The perpetrator, who had four prior criminal convictions, admitted to pouring 8 liters of gasoline into plastic bottles at a nearby petrol station and going to his son's flat. It was bustling with people who were celebrating a birthday party to which the perpetrator was not invited. He poured the gasoline in the hallway within the flat and then onto the entrance doors and set it ablaze. This led to the extremely fast spread of the fire throughout the flat with no escape route possible.

The fire killed six people on the 11th story of the 13-story building. Four people managed to save themselves by climbing through balconies to a nearby flat. Five more people, all of them already on fire, jumped to their deaths out of a window from a room without a balcony. Casualties included three children. The perpetrator's son, grandson, soon-to-be daughter-in-law and estranged wife all died. The perpetrator suffered burn wounds on his hands and legs.

== Fire ==
Authorities received multiple phone calls about the fire at 17:46 and 17:47. At 17:49, the fire department dispatched units from Bohumín (one fire engine and one ladder truck), Karviná (two fire engines) and Orlová (one fire engine and one ladder truck). Furthermore, the dispatcher called volunteer units from Bohumín-Šunychl (one fire engine) and Starý Bohumín (one fire engine) and a special high rise ladder truck from Ostrava.

The building was first reached by units from Bohumín and Starý Bohumín at 17:54 who immediately raced to the 11th floor to start rescue operations. Trucks from nearby Orlová reached the building at 18:01, volunteer units from Bohumín-Šunychl at 18:04 and units from 16 km-distant Karviná at 18:06. 28 firemen took part in the initial rescue operation, with more arriving afterwards for a total of 46 fire personnel with nine fire engines and three ladder trucks.

When firemen reached the building, the flat was already completely ablaze. Five people jumped out of a window to their deaths while a landing mattress was being prepared. The fire was under control at 18:30 and completely extinguished at 19:43.

== Victims ==
Six people were killed in the fire and five more from falling for a total of eleven fatalities. Nine people were rescued from other flats. Fifteen people needed medical attention, ten of them requiring transfer to a hospital. Among the injured were two firemen. A volunteer firefighter inhaled smoke and a professional firefighter suffered serious burns to the neck.

Media identified the following victims:

- Lukáš Konopka (30), perpetrator's son
- Dominik (9), perpetrator's grandson
- Lenka V. (30), perpetrator's soon-to-be daughter-in-law who was celebrating her 30th birthday
- Silvia (53), perpetrator's estranged wife and Lukáš Konopka's mother
- Jana, perpetrator's mother-in-law
- Nikola G. (17, 8 months pregnant), Lenka V.'s sister, who fell out of a window after a lengthy effort to hold onto its ledge
- Melinka
- (four dead unidentified by media)

Wounded victims who managed to climb through balconies to neighbour's flat:

- Rostislav, who was in the bathroom during initial blaze, suffered serious burns
- Žaneta, mother of victims Lenka and Nikola, who was in the bathroom with Rostislav during the initial blaze, suffered serious burns
- Jakub A., partner of victim Nikola
- Pavel

== Perpetrator ==
Police arrested Zdeněk Konopka in front of the building and two days later charged him with multiple murder and public endangerment.

According to the remand request filed by State Attorney Michal Król, the perpetrator had planned the attack in advance. He consumed alcohol in order to strengthen his resolve, filled two plastic bottles with gasoline at a nearby petrol station, and went to the flat with full knowledge of the birthday party that was taking place inside. The perpetrator stood in front of the entrance doors with open bottles of gasoline in each hand and rang the doorbell. A female, whose name was withheld in the publicly released remand request, opened the doors. Thereafter, the perpetrator threw one of the open bottles at the female victim, who reacted by slamming the doors shut. The perpetrator then poured the remaining gasoline onto the doors, with some of it pouring under the doors into the flat, and set it on fire. The perpetrator suffered burn wounds on his hands and legs. He went outside where he was confronted by the police and immediately arrested.

The Karviná district court ordered his remand on 11 August.

The perpetrator had four prior criminal convictions, two of them for violent crimes. He was known for aggression, as well as high consumption of alcohol. Several weeks before the arson attack, the perpetrator threatened his wife and son with a gas pistol at a nearby lake. Police didn't seek the perpetrator's remand at the time as the weapon used was not suitable to cause injury (the perpetrator could not legally possess a real firearm due to his criminal record). After the incident, the perpetrator's wife moved to the son's flat. Police investigation into this incident was still open at the time of the arson attack.

== Police response ==
Initial investigations conducted by the police revealed that the fire was deliberately set and concluded the incident was an arson attack. The motive was said to be a conflict within the family. Police officials detained Konopka, who was accused of setting the fire, and during an interview with Česká televize, regional police chief Tomáš Kužel compared the incident to the 2013 Frenštát pod Radhoštěm explosion which killed seven people.

== Sentencing ==
On 30 November 2021, the County Court in Ostrava accepted a plea bargain concluded between the perpetrator and the State Attorney, under which the perpetrator admitted guilt and accepted a sentence of life imprisonment. In doing so, the perpetrator avoided a lengthy public court trial.

== Other mass murders ==
The attack was the worst mass murder in post-WW2 Czech history (see list of massacres) until the 2023 Prague shooting. Other mass murders in the Czech Republic in the past decade include the 2013 Harok family murders, the apartment building explosion in Frenštát pod Radhoštěm, as well as the shootings in Uherský Brod (2015) and Ostrava (2019). According to investigators, the January 2020 Vejprty care center fire was also started deliberately, however no one has yet been charged with causing the 8 deaths that the fire caused. Another attempted mass murder by arson in Lenora in 2019 ended with only the perpetrator losing their life.

== See also ==
- 2009 Vítkov arson attack, another arson attack in the Czech Republic
