= Viktor Kalivoda =

Czech police officer and spree killer

- Kalivoda in 2004
- Born: 11 September 1977; Slaný
- Died: 26 September 2010 (aged 33); Valdice
- Cause of death: Suicide by exsanguination
- Other name: The Forest Killer
- Education: Masaryk University; University of South Bohemia in České Budějovice
- Occupation: Police officer
- Motive: Unknown
- Convictions: 3 counts of murder

Details
- Victims: 3
- Span of crimes: 13 October 2005 – October 16, 2005; 20 years ago
- Country: Czech Republic
- Location: Nedvědice
- Target: Strangers
- Weapon: 9mm Glock 34 semi-automatic pistol
- Date apprehended: 20 October 2005
- Imprisoned at: Valdice Prison

Viktor Kalivoda (11 September 1977 – 26 September 2010) was a Czech police officer and spree killer who shot and murdered three people in a forest in Nedvědice over the span of three days October 2005, and was also known by the nickname, the Forest Killer.

== Early life and education ==
Kalivoda was born in Slaný, where he studied at a local grammar school, excelling in mathematics and physics. His classmates described him as a silent, introverted loner. In 1996, he passed his matura and studied at the Faculty of Informatics of the Masaryk University in Brno and the Faculty of Education of the University of South Bohemia in České Budějovice.

== Career ==
After completing his studies, Kalivoda began working as a police officer in Prague 6 district of Prague. During this period, he attempted suicide several times, once considered to jump off of the Nusle Bridge and held a desire to commit a mass shooting on the Line C of the Prague Metro. On numerous occasions, he arrived at the metro with the intent of shooting commuters, concealing a pistol within a newspaper but each time did not find courage to go through with his plan.

In 2004, he appeared on the 333rd and 334th episodes of the Czech version of Who Wants to Be a Millionaire?, where he won 320,000 Czech koruna. He was eliminated after incorrectly guessing the name of the father of the Brothers Čapek.

== Murders and arrest ==
Kalivoda began his spree murders on 13 October 2005, where Kalivoda arrived at a forest in Nedvědice, carrying a 9mm Glock 34 semi-automatic pistol. There he spotted an elderly couple and murdered both by shooting them in the chest and head before fleeing the scene.

Three days later on 16 October, he returned to the forest where he came across a man from Malíkovice who was walking his dog. Kalivoda took the opportunity and shot him to death, but left the dog alone. On 20 October, he was arrested in front of his house in Slaný on the basis of eyewitness testimonies, where the police found the Glock 34 pistol inside of his residence.

== Trial, death and legacy ==
The trial began in 2006, Kalivoda did not admit his motive during the hearing but admitted his previous intention to commit a mass shooting on the Prague Metro before the triple murder. He did not show regret or remorse for his actions and on 27 June 2006, he was sentenced to life imprisonment; according to psychologists, the possibility of resocialization for him was zero. In prison letters, he admitted to being inspired to commit the murders by Czech mass murderer Olga Hepnarová, who murdered 8 people in 1973 by running them over with a Praga RN truck.

On 26 September 2010, Kalivoda killed himself in his cell in Valdice Prison by cutting his wrists. Over thirteen years after the suicide of Kalivoda, on the 21 December 2023, 14 people were murdered and 25 others were injured in a mass shooting at the Faculty of Arts of Charles University in Prague. The gunman, 24-year-old postgraduate student David Kozák, committed suicide by shooting himself with a shotgun afterwards, also had murdered his own father two hours before the shooting and six days prior had murdered a 32-year-old man and his 2-month-old daughter in Klánovice Forest. Investigators found that Kozák researched Kalivoda, the media drew comparisons between the two as both had murdered people in forests.

== See also ==
- David Kozák, Czech mass murderer who killed a man and his daughter in a forest in 2023
- Lava Lake murders, triple murder which occurred in a forest in Oregon, United States
