= Jan Philopon Dambrovský =

Executed Roman poisoner

- Born: 1540 (according to his will); Stryków, Kingdom of Poland
- Died: 16th-century Holy Roman Empire
- Cause of death: Execution by decapitation
- Other name: Joannes Philopon Dambrowski
- Conviction: Murder x4
- Penalty: Death

Details
- Victims: 4
- Span of crimes: 1572–1585
- Country: Holy Roman Empire
- State: Moravia
- Date apprehended: 1585

Jan Philopon Dambrovský (1540 – 1586/1587), also known as Joannes Philopon Dambrowski, was a 16th-century Roman Catholic priest and dean of the Olomouc chapter, responsible for the poisoning of four bishops.

== Accusations ==
At the end of 1585, Bishop Stanislav Pavlovský accused Dambrovský of poisoning several of his predecessors and some candidates for the episcopal see. While the church was investigating these claims, he was imprisoned at Hukvaldy Castle after he refused to proclaim his innocence. At one point, he unsuccessfully tried to escape.

The court documents themselves have either not been preserved or are kept in the Vatican Apostolic Archive, however, it is clear that Dambrovský confessed to poisoning four bishops during interrogations, starting with Vilém Prusinovský z Víckova and ending with Jan Mezoun z Telče. On February 3, 1586, he was found guilty of the murders by an Olomouc ecclesiastical court and deprived of his priesthood, honours and benefits.

Stanislav Pavlovský apparently hesitated for a long time before deciding how to deal with the disgraced former priest, who used his time to write various defences. In the end, Pavlovský decided to hand him over for execution. On 20 July 1586, he sent two Jesuits to Hukvaldy to interrogate Dambrovský. The exact date of his execution is unknown, however, in the Olomouc Book of Půhon, a "Priest Philopon" is recorded.

== See also ==
- List of serial killers by country

== Bibliography ==
- Jiří Fiala: Olomoucký pitaval, DANAL 1994, ISBN 80-901485-4-9 (in Czech)
- Breitenbacher Antonín: Candidature of Cardinal Ondřej of Austria for the Olomouc Diocese, ČMM 32 (1908) 43–64. (in Czech)
- Breitenbacher Antonín: A Contribution to the History of the Reformation of the Moravian Clergy under Bishop Stanislav Pavlovsky. The Philipon Affair. ČMM 31 (1907) 152–176, 444–445. (in Czech)
- Švábenský Mojmír: Paleographic problem. Edition of the will of the Dean of Olomouc Jan Dambrowský, bishop, from 1581, biskupotravce, z r. 1581, in: 140 let SOAB, Praha 1979, 157–172. (in Czech)
