= Klánovice Forest =

Forest in Prague, Czech Republic

Coordinates: 50.0861°N 14.6855°E

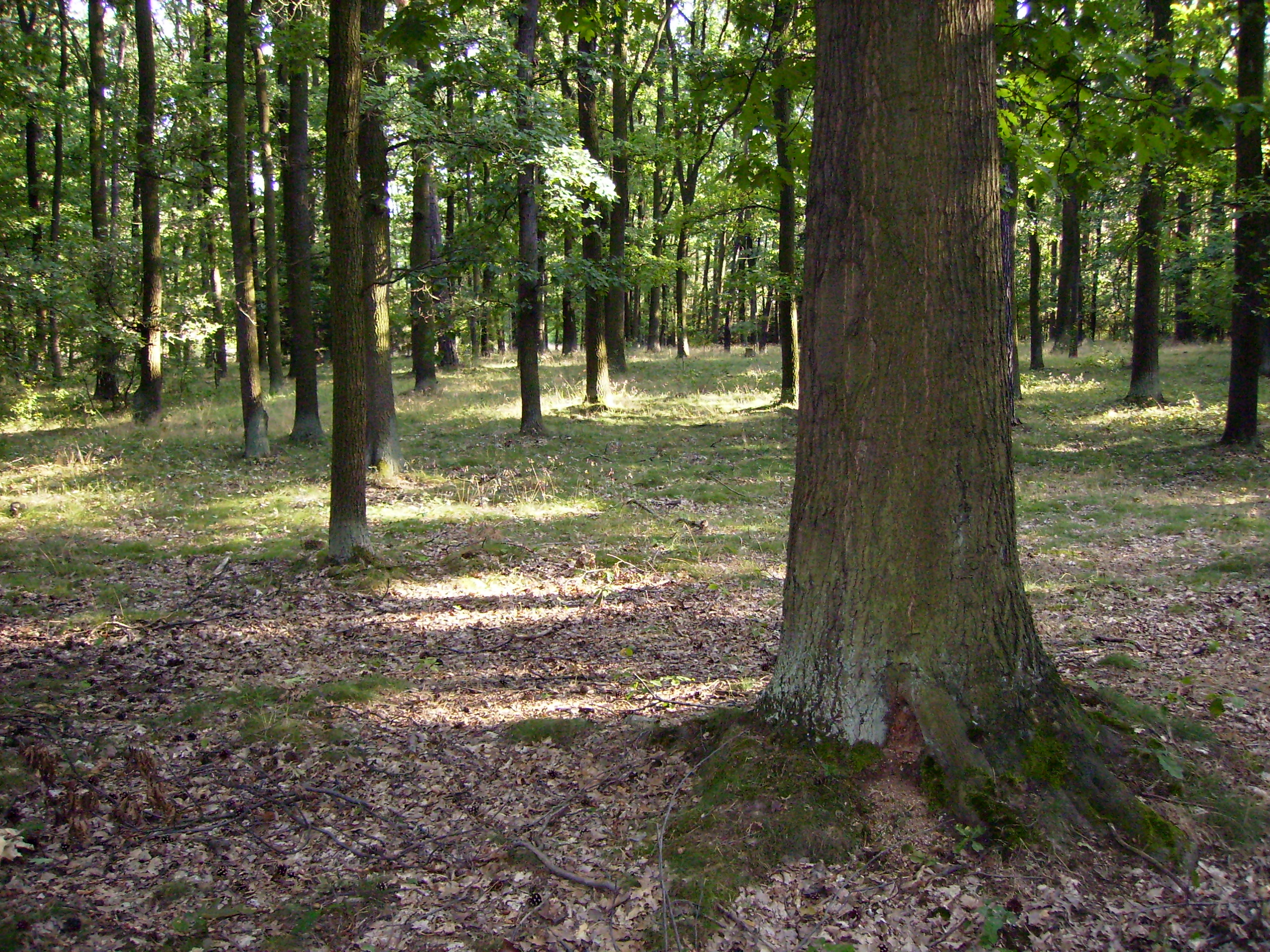
Klánovice Forest

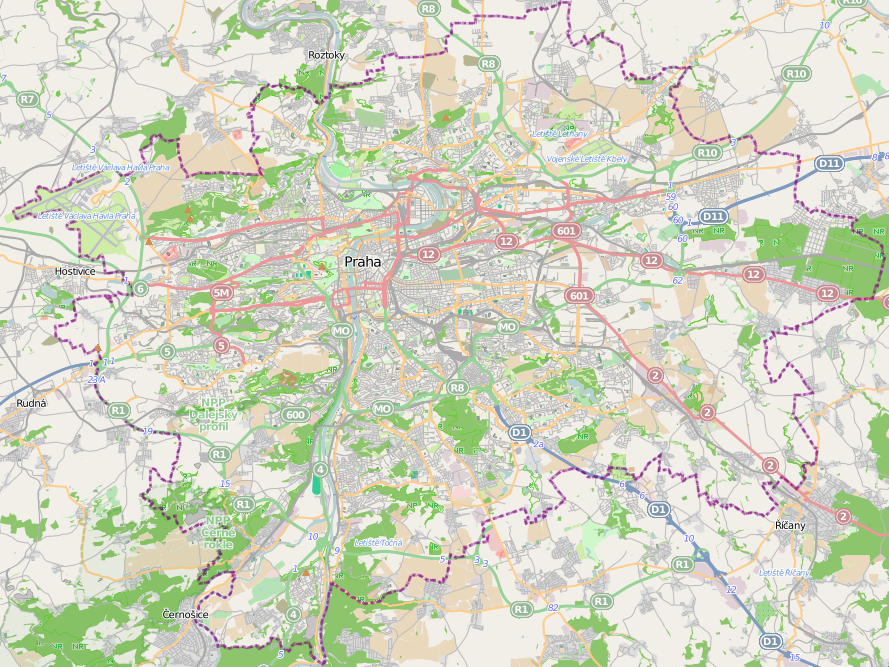

Klánovice Forest (Czech: Klánovický les, also known as Vidrholec or Fiedrholec) is a forest on the eastern outskirts of Prague, Czech Republic within the districts of Horní Počernice, Újezd nad Lesy and Klánovice, and the neighboring municipalities of Úvaly and Jirny. It is a popular tourist destination, with several designated hiking trails.

Prague eastern pole is located here.

Most of the park is protected as the Klánovice-Čihadla Nature Park, while other parts of it are protected as the Klánovický les nature reserve.

On 15 December 2023, a 32-year-old man and his 2-month-old daughter were both shot dead in Klánovice Forest by a 24-year-old postgraduate student David Kozák.
