= Žďár nad Sázavou school stabbing =

2014 incident in the Czech Republic

- Location: Žďár nad Sázavou, Vysočina Region, Czech Republic
- Date: 14 October 2014
- Target: Secondary school students
- Attack type: School stabbing, mass stabbing, hostage taking
- Weapons: 21 cm combat knife replica; Pepper spray
- Deaths: 1
- Injuries: 5+ (Note: Possibly more due to the inhalation and effects of the pepper spray) (including the perpetrator)
- Perpetrator: Barbora Orlová
- Defender: Petr Vejvoda
- Motive: Unclear

The Žďár nad Sázavou school stabbing and its earlier related incident in Havířov were two violent school stabbing attacks in the Czech Republic committed by the same woman suffering from mental illness. The first occurred on 22 May 2012 at Základní škola Moravská in Havířov, where she stabbed a staff member and held a pupil hostage. The second, more deadly incident happened on 14 October 2014 at Střední škola obchodní a služeb in Žďár nad Sázavou, resulting in the death of a 16‑year‑old student and injuries to several others.

== Stabbing ==
On the morning of 14 October 2014, Barbora Orlová, a 26‑year‑old woman from the Moravian-Silesian region entered the Střední škola obchodní a služeb by blending in with students, armed with an army knife replica with a 21 centimeters long blade and a pepper spray, and began attacking students. During the attack, a 16‑year‑old male student named Petr Vejvoda was fatally stabbed while trying to help an injured female classmate. The injured female classmate the managed to flee the scene and Orlová then proceeded to stab and take a different female student as a hostage. During the hostage taking, Orlová demanded to be shot and killed by a tactical police unit. Due to the pepper spray, first responders struggled to access the building, which complicated the rescue of the injured. Eventually, Orlová agreed to exchange her injured hostage for a police negotiator, Petr Gruber. After 28 minutes, a tactical police unit assigned to the Dukovany Nuclear Power Plant arrived at the scene and eventually neutralized Orlová using a taser. Shortly before being restrained and detained, Orlová injured Gruber by cutting his head. Vejvoda succumbed to his injuries at the scene and at least three other female students and Gruber were injured by stabbing during the attack.

== Perpetrator ==
The perpetrator was idenitified as Barbora Orlová, a 26‑year‑old woman from the Ostrava region with no prior connection to the school or its students. She had a documented history of serious psychiatric illness, including schizophrenia.

She had previously carried out a similar attack in May 2012 in Havířov, stabbing a school employee and taking a pupil hostage; that case was later discontinued due to her mental incapacity.

== 2012 incident ==
2012 Havířov school stabbing
- Location: Havířov, Moravian-Silesian Region, Czech Republic
- Date: 22 May 2012
- Target: students and staff
- Attack type: School stabbing, Hostage taking
- Weapon: Several knives
- Deaths: 0
- Injuries: 1
- Perpetrator: Barbora Orlová
- Motive: Mental illness

On 22 May 2012, the same perpetrator that attacked the Žďár nad Sázavou secondary school in 2014 entered Základní škola Moravská in the Havířov‑Šumbark district. She stabbed a staff member multiple times and took a seven‑year-old pupil hostage. Police negotiators and a specialist intervention unit secured the release of the child and arrested the assailant.

== Aftermath ==
The Czech government announced plans to review national mental health care policies and school safety protocols to prevent similar attacks. Then‑Prime Minister Bohuslav Sobotka emphasized the incident highlighted potential failures in the care and supervision of mentally ill individuals. On 28 October 2015, Petr Vejvoda was posthumously awarded the Medal of Heroism by President Miloš Zeman. The injured police negotiator, Petr Gruber also received awards for his actions during the attack.

== See also ==
- List of attacks related to secondary schools (2010s)
- 2023 Charles University shooting
