= Celetná =

Street in Prague Old Town

Coordinates: 50°5′13.7″N 14°25′28.4″E

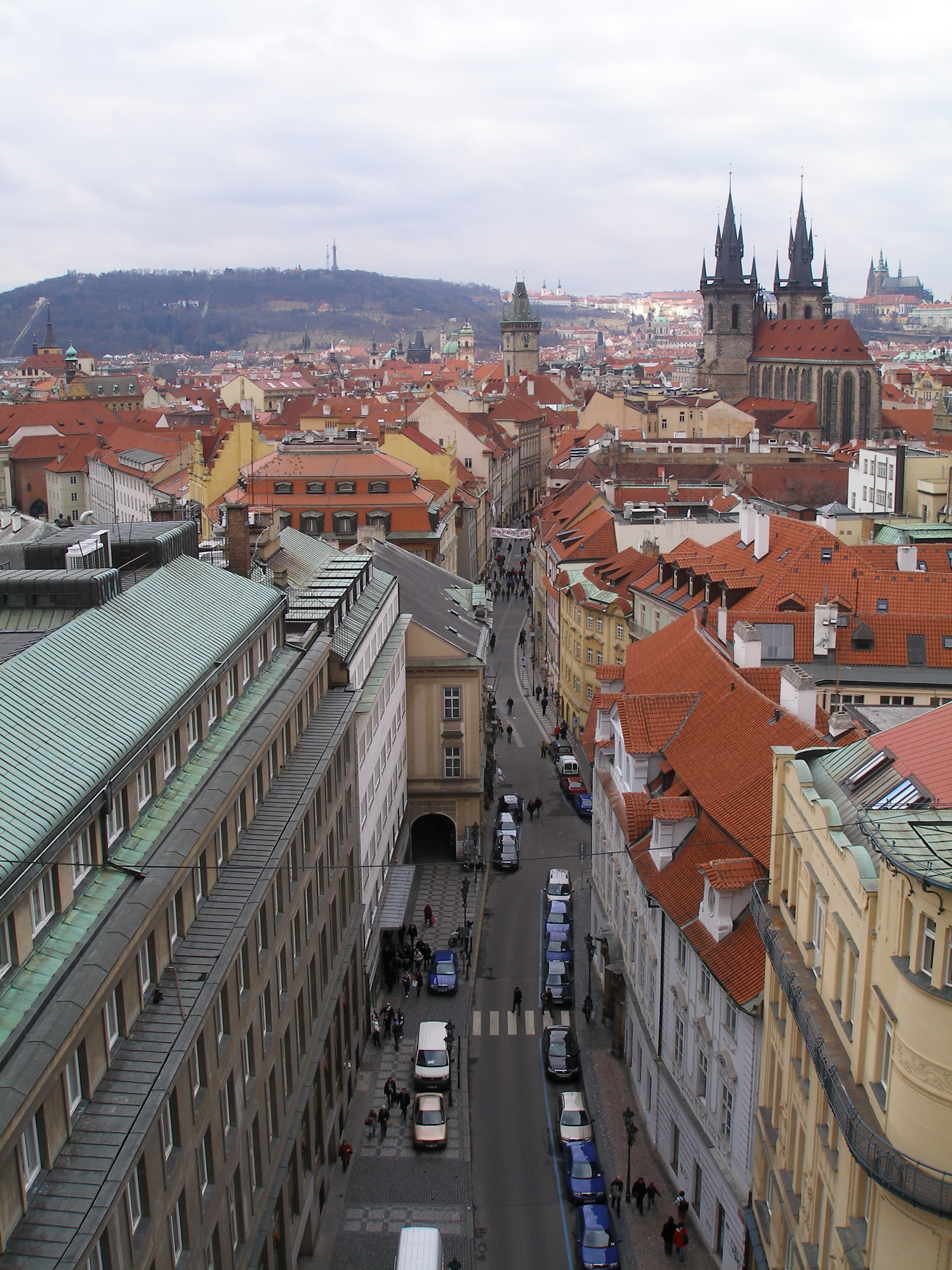
Celetná street.

Celetná (German: Zeltnergasse) is a street in the Old Town, Prague, connecting the Old Town Square with the Powder Gate. It is one of the oldest streets in Prague and is part of the Royal Route. The street is approximately 400 meters long and trams once ran on it, today most of the street has the status of a pedestrian zone.

== History ==
Celetná (formerly Caletná) is a former Prague trade route. The street is named after bread, which was called Calta, that was baked in the area during the Middle Ages. It became a part of the Royal Route in the 14th century. The coronation parade would travel down Celetná.

The Knights Templar used to hold meetings at the Temple, at 27. After the ending of the Knights Templar in 1312, secret meetings were held by the Knights in the basement. The building then became a hospital, and then a home in 1784. Franz Kafka had connections to the street, having been a lawyer at Pachta Palace. The palace, at 36, is the former headquarters of the Prague Military Commandment starting in 1784 until 1849. Kafka lived from 1888 until 1889 with his family at the Sixt House at 2, once property of Sixts' of Ottersdorf and a cafe until 1618. He lived from 1896 until 1907 At the Three Kings, at 3, next to the Týn Church. At the Golden Angel, at 29, is a former inn. Wolfgang Amadeus Mozart stayed there. At the Red Eagle, at 21, is a former cafe "U Suchých", which served as a major gathering spot for Czech National Revival figures like writer Karel Hynek Mácha and playwright Josef Kajetán Tyl. Karel Hynek Mácha used to frequent it. In Jorge Luis Borges's story "The Secret Miracle" the main character, Jaromir Hladik resides on this street in March, 1939. A Piarists school used to be located at the Menhart House at 17. Giovanni Battista Alliprandi designed the building combining High Baroque with the remains of a Romanesque house at 12, the Hrzan of Harasov Palace. One of the first stone houses in Prague of the 13th century stood at 11, Former Millesimo Palace at 13 was in the 19th century a casino of the nobility. Former Buquoy Palace at 20 since 1762 was owned by Charles University. 22, also owned by it, now is a brewery but was a jewellery factory since 1804 and changed its owners in 1861 to Mercy printing house and goldsmith Gindl. A Baroque house at 23 has a facade with a sculpture of Madonna of 1720 from Matthias Braun workshop. Now Cerna Madonna restaurant at 34 is an example of Cubism built in 1912 after Josef Gočár project.

== Today ==
Architecturally, many of the houses have been remodeled under the Baroque and Classical architecture styles. Some buildings still have Romanesque and Gothic architecture foundations. The House of the Black Madonna is located on the street.

== See also ==
- Districts of Prague
