= Ostrava hospital shooting =

2019 mass shooting in the Czech Republic

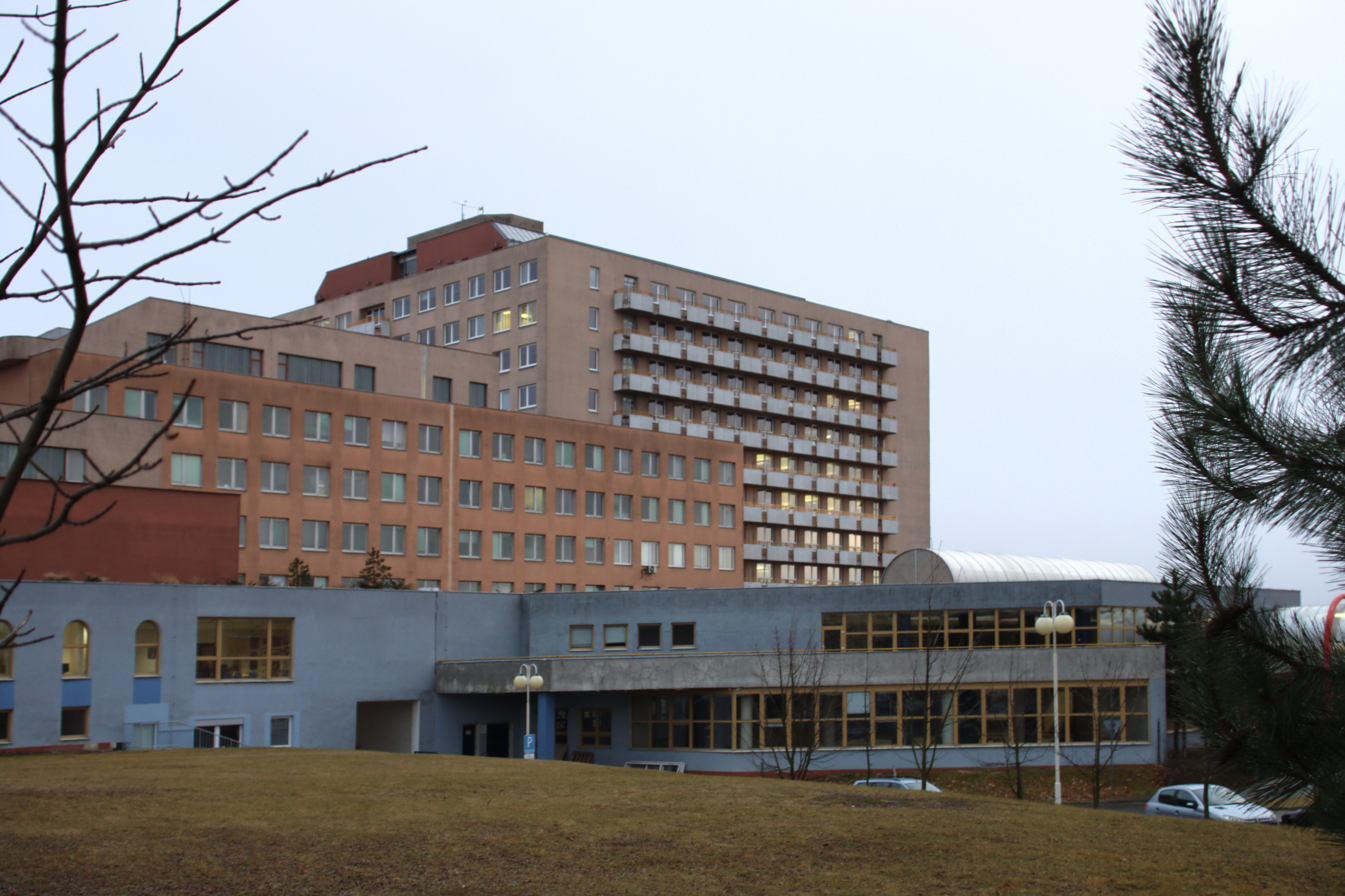
- Ostrava University Hospital

- Attack site (Czech Republic)
- Location: 49°49′44″N 18°9′37″E; Ostrava University Hospital, Ostrava, Czech Republic
- Date: 10 December 2019 c. 7:15 a.m.
- Attack type: Mass shooting, mass murder, murder–suicide
- Weapon: CZ 75B semi-automatic pistol
- Deaths: 8 (including the perpetrator)
- Injuries: 2
- Perpetrator: Ctirad Vitásek
- Motive: Uncertain (possibly hypochondriacal depression)

The Ostrava hospital shooting was a mass shooting that occurred on 10 December 2019 at the Ostrava University Hospital in Ostrava, Czech Republic. A total of seven people were killed in the attack, and two others were injured. The illegally armed perpetrator, 42-year-old Ctirad Vitásek, left the scene before the police arrived and committed suicide as police closed in on him later during the day. The perpetrator had three previous criminal convictions, including one for a violent crime, and a previous hospitalization in a psychiatric ward.

== Attack ==
The perpetrator entered the hospital in the early morning and wandered through its hallways. He briefly stopped at the cardiology waiting room and then at the gastroenterology waiting room, both of which were almost empty.

He then entered the traumatology waiting room on the third floor of the hospital building at around 7:15 a.m. There were about thirty people in the room, all of them either partially immobile (on a wheelchair or with a limb in splint) or accompanying a partially immobile family member. The perpetrator first crossed through the waiting room towards the doctor's office, however, the doors there were still locked. He rattled the locked doors, but his apparent attempt to open them failed. He then stood quietly with an illegal CZ 75B pistol in one hand in a low position by his leg. He raised the pistol to his head for a few seconds, but did not pull the trigger. Several witnesses expressed regret that there had not been anyone legally armed inside to stop the perpetrator at that moment.

After this, the perpetrator opened fire on the people inside. After firing three shots, his weapon jammed. According to an eyewitness, it was clear that the perpetrator was not practiced in using a gun. It took him about five seconds to clear the malfunction. He was visibly shaking and loudly gritting his teeth.

After clearing the malfunction, the perpetrator continued to shoot people in the room, aiming at victims' heads and necks, killing six adults. Two of the victims were off-duty prison guards, one with a leg in a splint and the other accompanying his minor daughter. A third victim in the waiting room also had law enforcement training, having left the prison service ten years prior. At the time of the attack, all three were unarmed. Three other people sustained injuries, one of them dying several days later.

When first responders arrived, the perpetrator had already escaped the scene.

== Police response ==
Police received the first emergency call at 7:19 a.m. and the first police unit reached the location of the incident five minutes later. By the time they arrived, the perpetrator had already left the hospital. All Czech policemen are armed with pistols and a typical patrol car includes two policemen who usually have at least one select-fire rifle (HK MP5, MP7 or G36) in the trunk, as well as bullet proof vests. Aside from these general purpose patrols Czech police also have a system of special "first order" patrol cars, whose two policemen have heavy body armor, a select-fire rifle each, and extensive active killer training. The first order patrol cars are positioned so as to reach any similar incident within ten minutes anywhere in the country and thus overcome the delay needed for the arrival of a complete tactical unit.

The perpetrator drove away from the hospital in a grey Renault Laguna, at some point taking down its registration plates, possibly to avoid detection by automatic traffic cameras. Three hours later, the perpetrator arrived at his parents' house in Jilešovice, 8 km (5 mi) from the hospital. There he confessed to the crime and told his mother that he was going to kill himself. His mother called the police and informed them about her son being the perpetrator, his whereabouts and a description of his car. By this time, the police had arrested eight men in the hospital, its vicinity and elsewhere in Ostrava who fit the initial general description of the perpetrator, which later turned out to be completely wrong.

The police sent a helicopter and ground units to the vicinity of Děhylov, where the perpetrator was supposed to be according to his mother, and found him after a while. As ground units closed in, he self-inflicted a gunshot wound to his head. Although he was initially conscious and communicated with first responders, he succumbed to his injury after 30 minutes of resuscitation attempts.

== Possible motive ==
The perpetrator's family and friends had observed his mental state gradually deteriorating over a long period of time. According to them his mental state significantly worsened in September 2019. The perpetrator became obsessed with a belief that he suffered from a fatal illness, supposedly pancreatic cancer. However, numerous hospital visits and detailed examinations ruled this possibility out. The perpetrator was seeking further medical examinations while on sick leave from work about a month before the attack.

During one medical examination, the perpetrator's partner told the doctor to issue a request for psychiatric evaluation, claiming that he had become "impossible to live with". She stated that the perpetrator was convinced that he would die imminently, often breaking down and crying.

Although a psychiatric evaluation was arranged, the perpetrator did not go through with it. Instead, he sought further examination for cancer. The perpetrator had spent time in a psychiatric ward two years before the attack following hospitalization for tetany, which is often accompanied by depression.

== Origin of murder weapon ==
The perpetrator had three previous criminal convictions, including one for a violent crime. He had also been hospitalized in a psychiatric ward. Both of these factors rendered him ineligible to legally possess a firearm in the Czech Republic.

The perpetrator used a CZ 75 pistol that was made about 30 years before as a non-functional cut-away replica for purposes of education and training. This free-to-buy cutaway was later illegally modified to full functionality. Police experts had not encountered a similar conversion of a cut-away before and noted that it was done in a very sophisticated way. Nevertheless, the firearm jammed at least once during the attack.
