= Law enforcement in the Czech Republic =

Law enforcement in the Czech Republic is divided between several agencies. The main agency is the Police of the Czech Republic with general vested authority limited only in areas of operation of other authorities.

== State agencies ==
Agency	Scope of operation	Area of operation	No. of officers	Governmental authority	Seal	Car livery
Police of the Czech Republic	General law enforcement and policing, investigation of any misdemeanors and crimes that don't fall within jurisdiction of other agency	Nationwide, divided into 14 regional HQs	40.500	Ministry of Interior		Czech State Police Škoda Scala
Fire Rescue Service of the Czech Republic	Apart from fire and other rescue service, also supervision of compliance with fire prevention and safety laws.	Nationwide, divided into 14 regional HQs	10.200	Ministry of Interior		Tatra Terra Firetruck
The Customs Administration of the Czech Republic	Collection of taxes (which belong to the Republic) and custom duties (which belong to the European Union), supervision of imports and exports, supervision of trade with trademarks, licenses, endangered animal species, combating illicit drugs crime, illegal immigration. Authorized also to stop vehicles and search them for possible contraband, etc.	Nationwide	4.000	Ministry of Finance		Czech Customs Škoda Kodiaq
Prison Service of the Czech Republic	Mainly runs and guards prisons, but includes also Judicial Guard that is responsible for safeguarding the courthouses or providing protection to individual judges, state attorneys or court clerks (when needed). Also conducts criminal investigation of crimes that take place within prison houses.	Mainly within buildings under its authority	10.700	Ministry of Justice		VW T6 Prisoner Transport
Road Transport Inspection	Checks adherence to road transport standards, mainly as regards professional transport (truck, buses), but may also check private cars. Technical state of vehicles, weight limits, etc. Established on 1 July 2025.	Public roads	80	Ministry of Transport		
General Inspection of Security Forces	Investigation of crimes committed by members of Czech Law enforcement agencies (policemen, Custom service officials, prison guards, etc.)	Nationwide	280	Prime Minister		
Security Information Service	Authority in the field of counterintelligence, counter-terrorism, monitoring of extremist organizations, etc.	Nationwide	Unknown	Government of the Czech Republic		
Office of Foreign Relations and Information	Foreign intelligence service.	Worldwide	Unknown	Government of the Czech Republic		
Military Police (Czech Republic)	Military police	Nationwide	1.200	Ministry of Defense		

== Municipal police ==
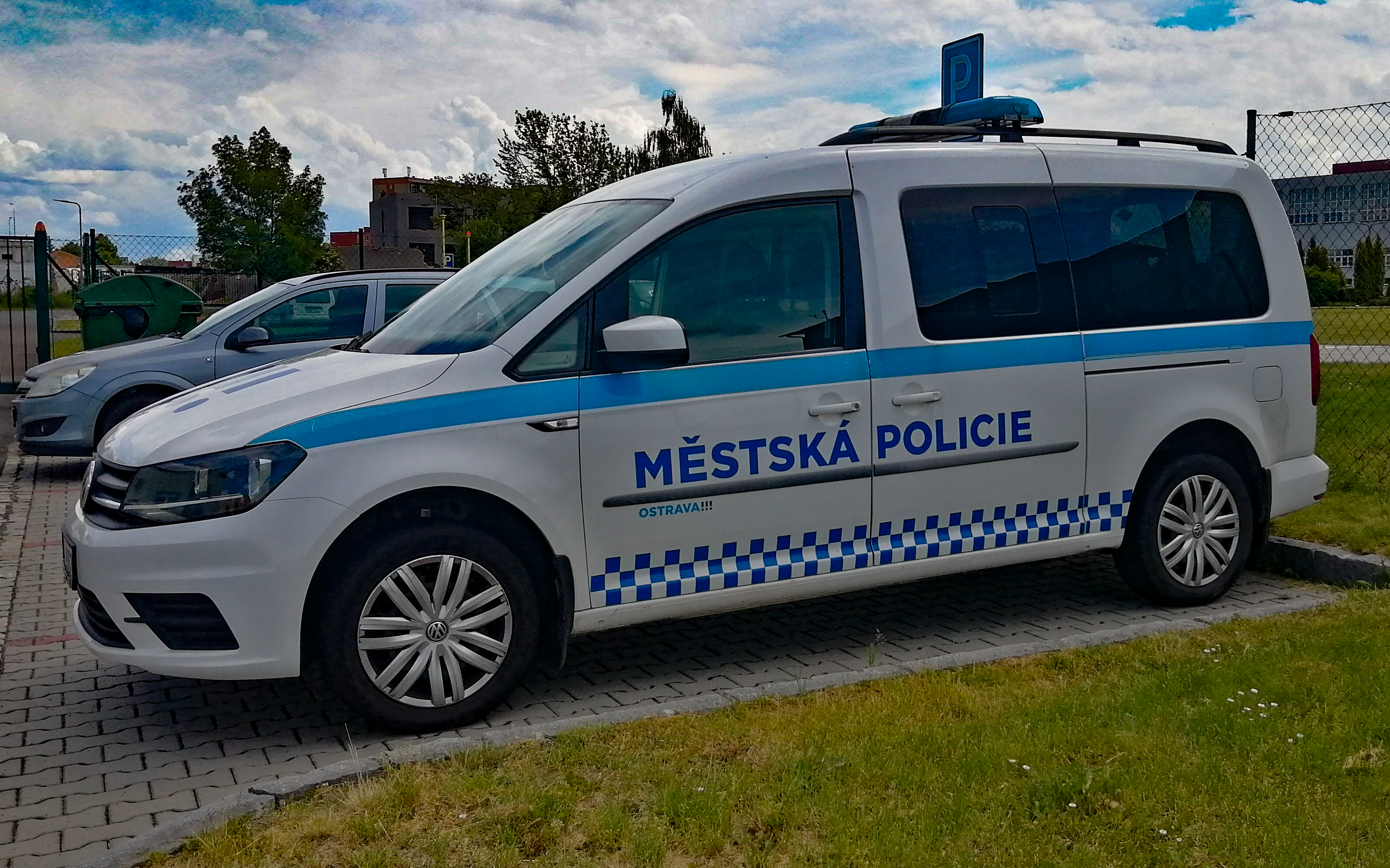
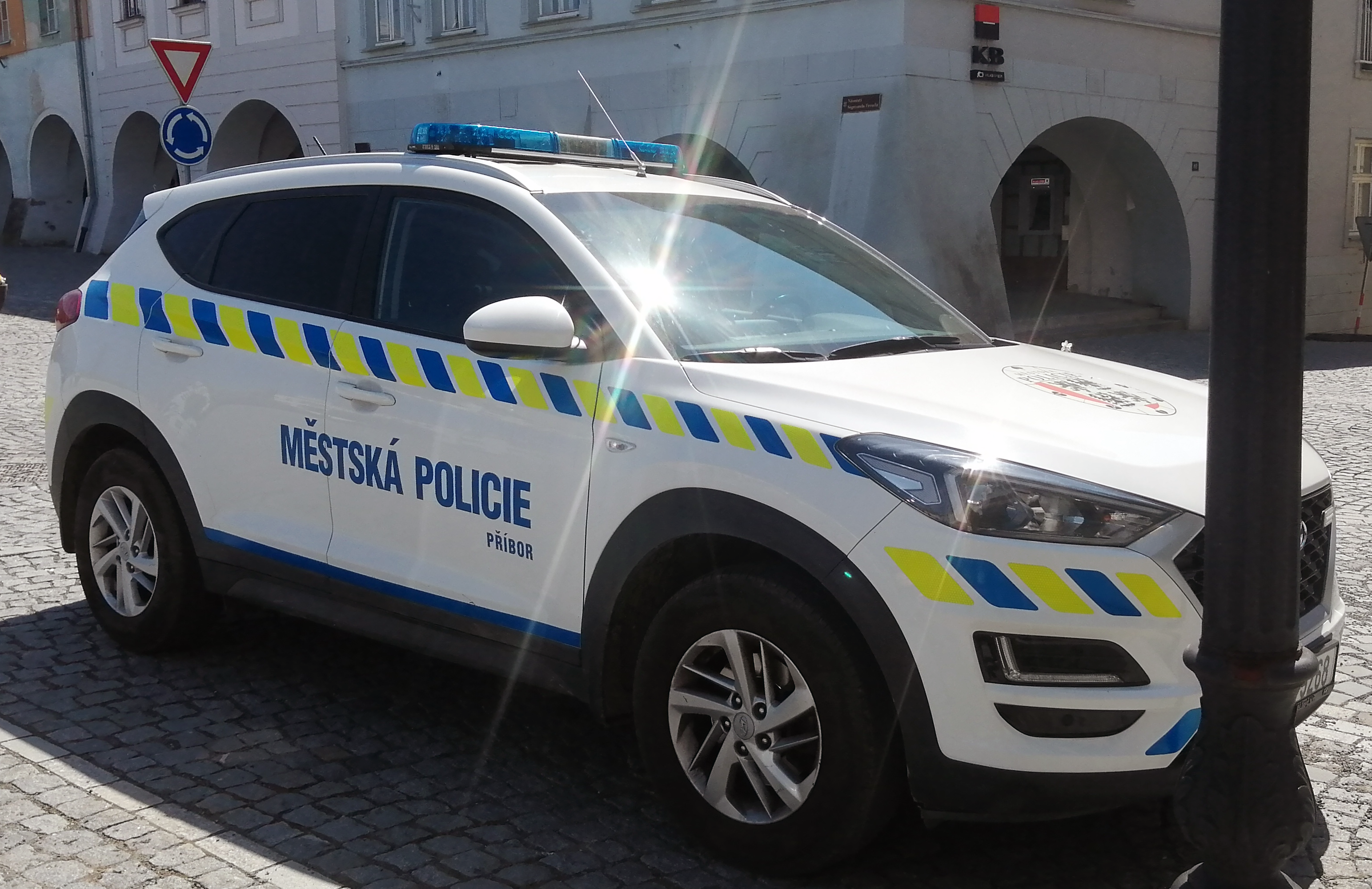
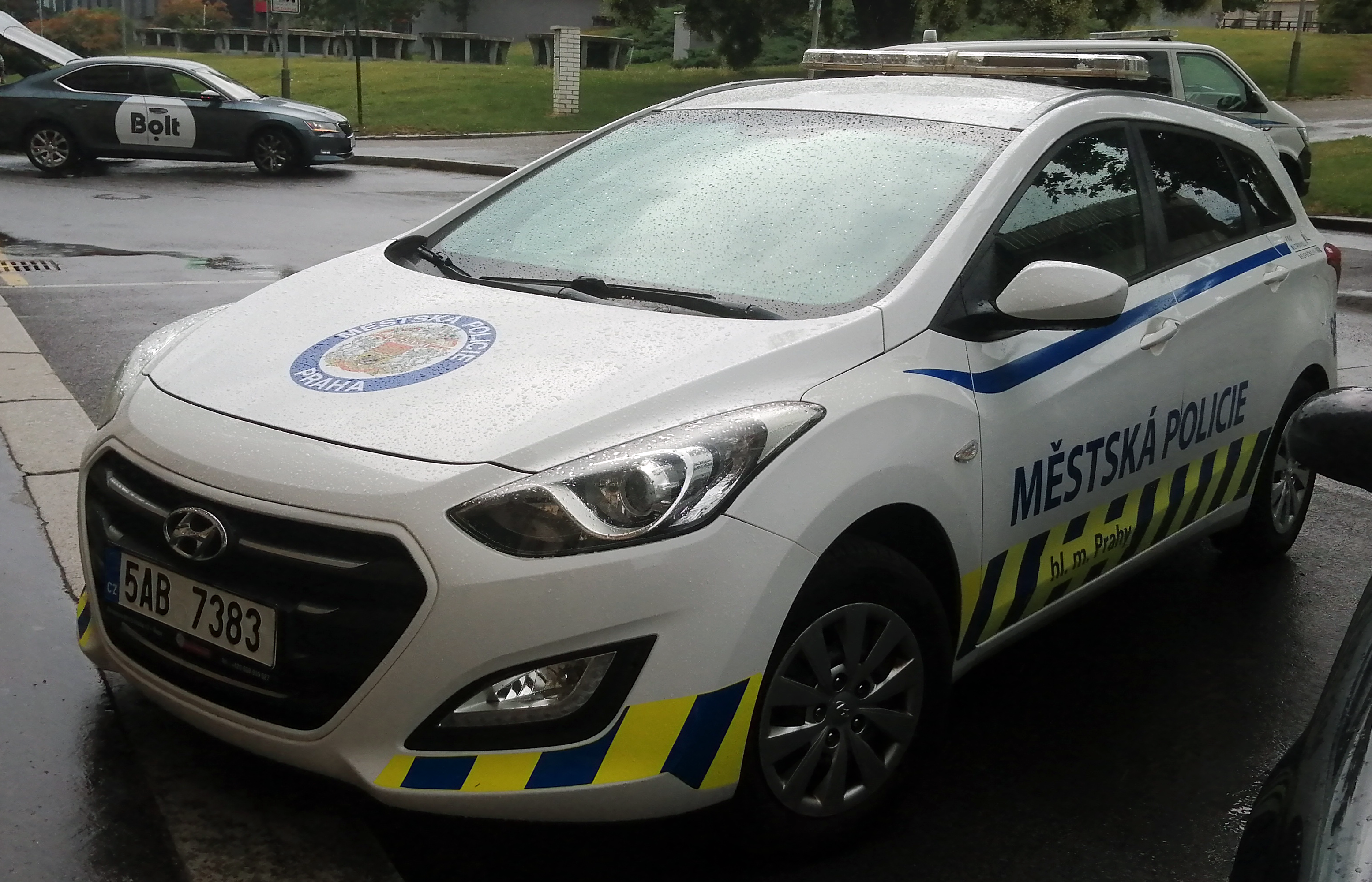
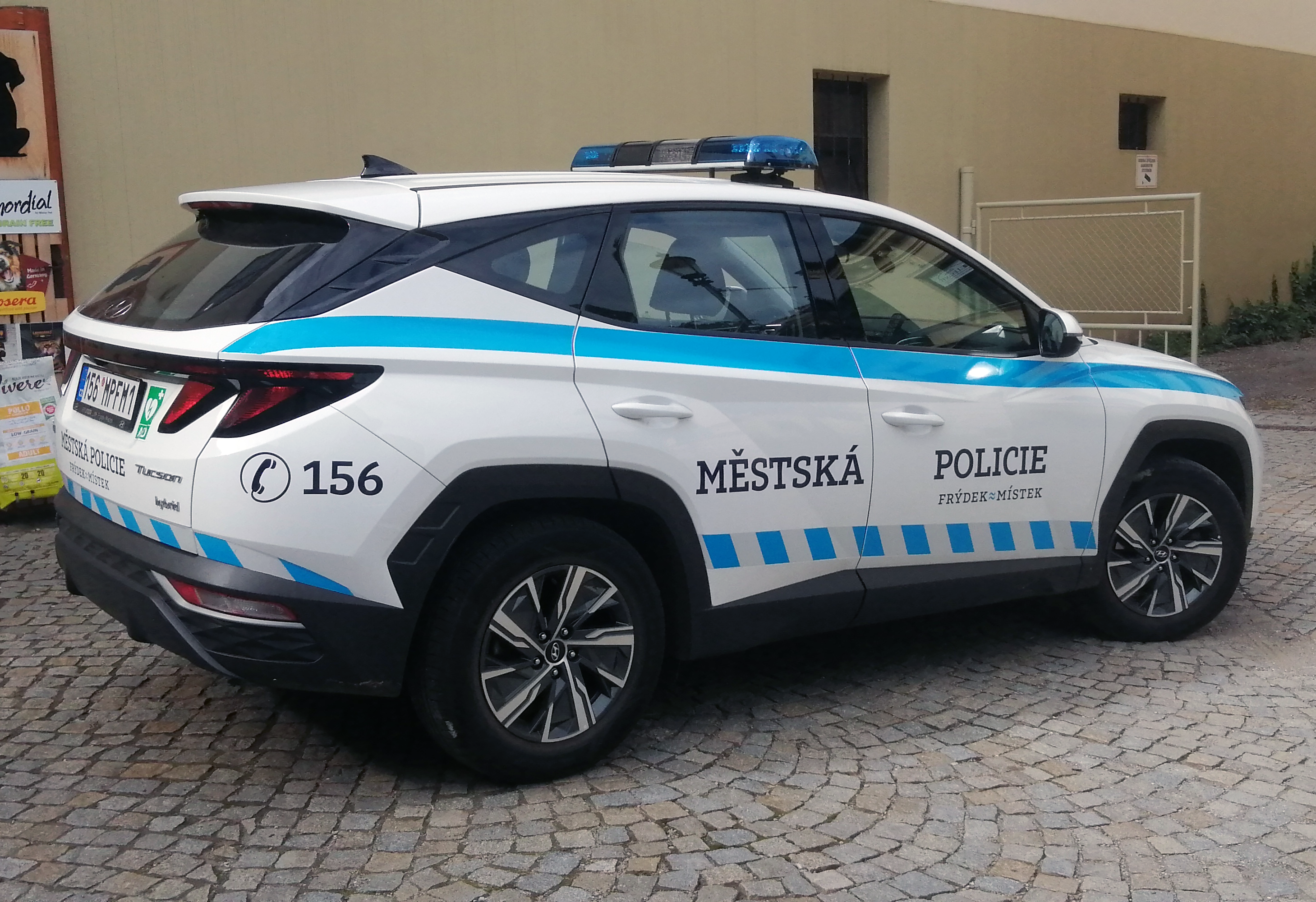
Various liveries of Czech municipal police cars.

Any municipality in the Czech Republic, no matter how large or small, may decide to establish its own Municipal police (Czech: Obecní policie or Městská policie in cities) by a local ordinance. In 2024, 390 municipalities (out of 6.254) established its own Municipal Police, employing 8.500 municipal police officers. Municipal police authority is generally limited to the area of given municipality, however neighboring municipalities may conclude agreement which extends authority of a given municipal police also over its territory (this is usually used by small municipalities located adjacent to large towns in order to save funds). Municipal police department is controlled by the mayor or another authorized member of the municipal council. The emergency phone number of the municipal police is 156.

Municipal police have jurisdiction over misdemeanors, supervise and protect the safety of citizens and properties, public order, collaborate within their competence with the state police in terms of safety on the roads, deal with offenses and other wrongs, etc. Officers of municipal police are armed and usually patrol on foot, bike, or car. Municipal police cannot investigate crimes and doesn't take investigations, municipal policemen secure the suspects on the scene (also can transport suspects to the nearest state police station) and hand the case further to the state police for investigation. Officers of the municipal police in large cities are the basic public order keepers. Many municipal police agencies have common radio frequency with the state police to provide better and quicker response. This system is highly used in larger cities where it often happens that several municipal and state police units arrive to the scene at the same time. Municipal police often conducts common safety policing campaigns with the state police. Cooperation in general is on very high level.

Unlike the state police officers, the municipal police officers are regarded as civilians. While in many other countries in Europe the municipal policemen are unarmed, the Czech municipal police officers all have firearms which they carry openly. Due to their civilian status they need to obtain a D category gun license in order to be able to be armed.

== Rangers ==
Supervision of adherence to laws in specific areas is handed to authority of sworn rangers (Czech: stráž). Rangers are civilians who conduct their duties with vested public authority.

Rangers generally have the authority to request identification of persons in their jurisdiction and issuing fines for breaches of respective laws. Due to their very limited authority, they may request assistance of municipal or state police when needed. When necessary, they may also detain a person until the state police arrives - anyone is legally obliged to obey ranger's order to wait for the arrival of state police.

Rangers can be armed under the same rules as any other civilians, see Gun politics in the Czech Republic. Unlike members of Municipal Police, who are also considered civilians with vested public authority, rangers are obliged to carry their firearms concealed. Exception being Gamekeeper Rangers, who can carry their hunting rifles openly within a hunting area.

There are four types of rangers in the Czech Republic, each of them being established by a separate act of law:

- Environmental Rangers (Czech: stráž přírody) - jurisdiction in the area of protection of environment, most usually in the natural reserve areas or places where endangered species may be found
- Forestry Rangers (Czech: lesní stráž) - jurisdiction in the area of usage of woods, especially as regards lumbering, reforestation, etc.
- Gamekeeper Rangers (Czech: myslivecká stráž) - jurisdiction in the area of adherence to hunting laws
- Fishing Rangers (Czech: rybářská stráž) - jurisdiction in the area of adherence to fishing laws (freshwater fishing is very popular in the country)

== See also ==
- Crime in the Czech Republic
- Czech Police Museum
- StB (Czechoslovak State Security) - Cold War
- Veřejná bezpečnost - Communist era police service
