= Intelligence System of the Czech Republic =

Czech government intelligence group

The Czech Republic Intelligence System (IS) is responsible for the collection, analysis, reporting and dissemination of intelligence on threats to the Czech Republic, both foreign and domestic. It is also responsible for collecting intelligence on foreign nations, organisations, person and groups. The IS is vital towards the protection and promotion of the Czech Republic and its interests. The major priorities of the systems are determined by the executive power. The activities on the IS must follow the respective laws. The President of the Czech Republic can request for information to be collected without the government's approval but with their knowledge.

== National Security Council ==
The body which coordinates security matters is the National Security Council (NSC). The NSC is headed by the Prime Minister of the Czech Republic (currently Andrej Babiš). Other members of the council include: the deputy prime minister, the minister of foreign affairs, minister of defense, minister of trade and industry, the minister of health, the governor of the Czech National Bank, the chairman of the Administration of the State Material Reserves and the head of the Office of the Government of the Czech Republic. The president also attend's NSC meetings.

== Committee for Intelligence Activities ==
While the NSC is in charge of security matters and ensuring security of the republic, the Committee for Intelligence Activities (CIA – sometimes referred to as the "Committee") is in charge of the intelligence services in the system. It is tasked with coordinating the activities on the intelligence services in the system. It is also tasked with preparing measures in respect of intelligence activity and cooperating with state agencies and offices. The committee's chairman is the prime minister. Other members on the committee include the deputy chairman (minister of the interior), the minister of foreign affairs, the minister of defence, the minister of labour and social affairs, the head of the Office of the Government of the Czech Republic, and the directors of the intelligence services of the Czech Republic. The secretariat in this committee is tasked with preparing expert conceptual documents.

== Organization of the system ==
- Government of the Czech Republic
- Security Information Service
- National Security Council
- Committee for Intelligence Activities
- Ministry of Defence
- Military Intelligence
- Ministry of the Interior
- Office of Foreign Relations and Information

== See also ==
- Centre Against Terrorism and Hybrid Threats
