= Centre Against Terrorism and Hybrid Threats =

- Centrum proti terorismu a hybridním hrozbám
- Active: started on 1 January 2017
- Country: Czech Republic
- Branch: Ministry of the Interior
- Role: Counter-terrorism, counterpropaganda

Centre Against Terrorism and Hybrid Threats (Czech: Centrum proti terorismu a hybridním hrozbám) is a counterpropaganda and counter-terrorism unit of the Ministry of the Interior of the Czech Republic primarily aimed at countering disinformation, fake news, hoaxes and foreign propaganda. The Centre also monitors internal security threats including migration, extremism, violation of public order and soft target attacks as well as "disinformation campaigns related to internal security".

== See also ==
- Czech Republic–Russia relations#Russia's espionage and other illicit activity in Czech Republic
- European Centre of Excellence for Countering Hybrid Threats of Finland
- European Union Intelligence and Situation Centre
- Intelligence System of the Czech Republic
- Security Information Service, the national intelligence agency of the Czech Republic
