= Crime in the Czech Republic =

- Homicide: 0.6 (2024)
- Assault: 39.4 (2023)
- Burglary: 271.0 (2024)
- Theft: 300.6 (2024)
- Fraud: 167.5 (2024)
- Corruption: 14.0 (2024)
- Bribery: 1.1 (2024)
- Money laundering: 12.5 (2024)
- Rape: 16.2 (2023)
- Sexual violence: 17.2 (2023)
- reported per 100,000 inhabitants

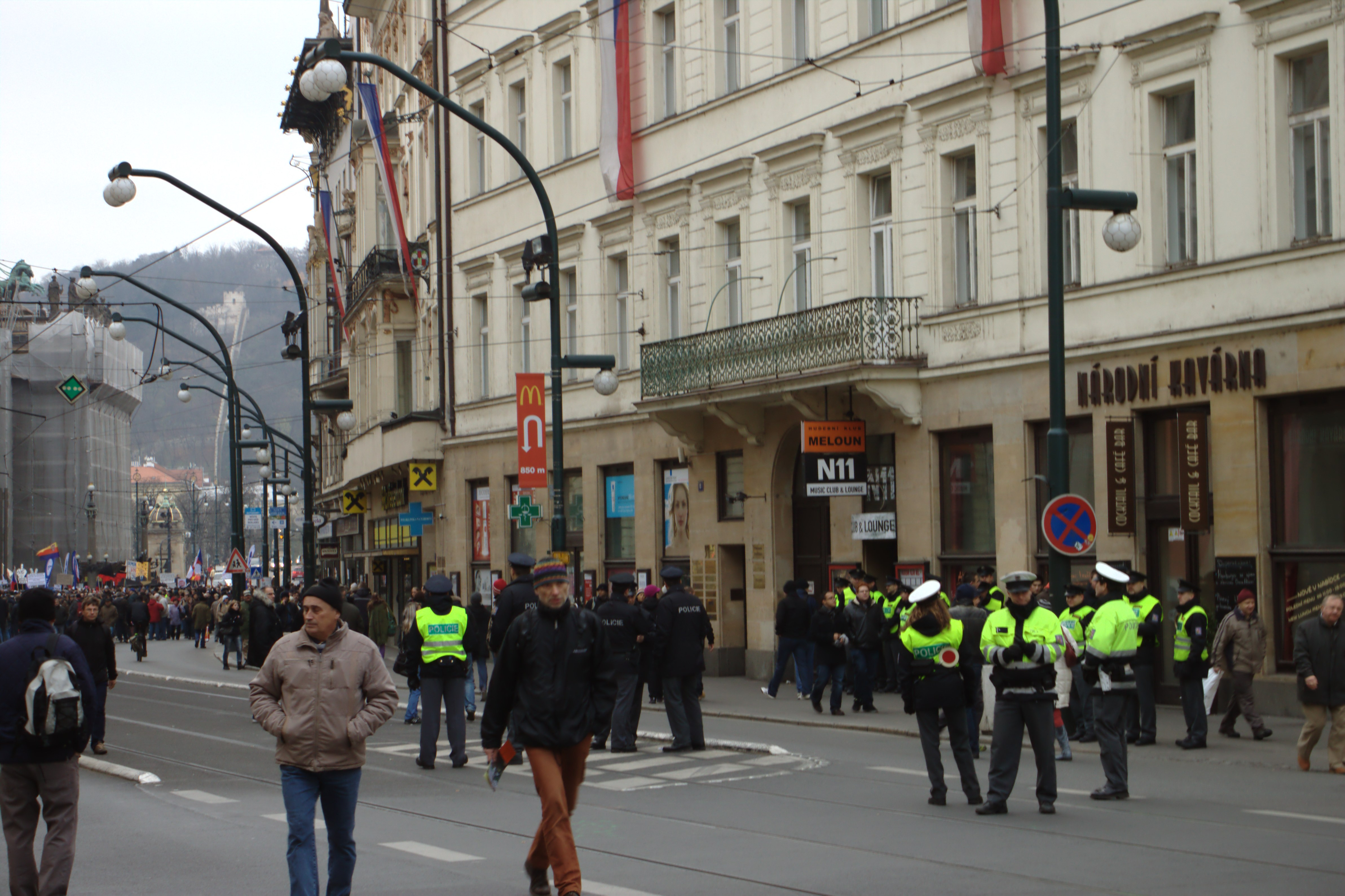
Czech Police on a street in Prague

Crime in the Czech Republic is combated by the Czech Police and other agencies.

== Crime by type ==
=== Murder ===
In 2012, the Czech Republic had a murder rate of 1.0 per 100,000 population. There were a total of 105 murders in the Czech Republic in 2012.

=== Corruption ===
Political corruption (especially bribery) and theft are some of the most severe issues in the Czech Republic. Group of States Against Corruption mainly criticises the lack of pro-active monitoring of the financing and states that an effective supervisory mechanism is missing.

A survey of Transparency International in 2009 showed that fewer than 1 in 10 respondents find the anti-corruption efforts of their government effective. In 2010, 44% of people answered that the corruption increased.

=== Terror attacks ===
In 2014, 2 explosions destroyed 2 munition warehouses in Vrbětice, killing 2 people. Originally left unsolved, the explosions were revealed in 2021 to have been committed by the Russian secret service.

In January 2019 a 71-year-old Czech pensioner, Jaromír Balda, was sentenced to four years for terrorism after he had cut down trees to block railway lines in order to pretend Islamists were responsible. He had left messages at the scene saying "Allahu Akbar" ("God is great" in Arabic). He became the first (and remains the only) Czech person convicted of terrorism. He was released after 2 years and 8 months on the condition he would accept regular psychiatric treatment.

== Youth crime ==
At the age of 15, youths are considered to have diminished criminal responsibility and reach the age of full criminal responsibility at 18. In the 10 years prior to and including 2006, there were 4,000 projects, the majority aimed at juvenile crime, introduced to increase cooperation between citizens, municipal bodies, and the Czech police. The goal of these programs is to increase education, training, and crime prevention within the communities by providing youth with several leisure and sports activities.

Boys are the victims of robbery four times that of girls but for both boys and girls, the risk of victimization of robbery decreases with grade level.

== See also ==
- Human trafficking in the Czech Republic
- Law enforcement in the Czech Republic
- List of Czech criminals
