= Ministry of the Interior (Czech Republic) =

Government ministry

Ministry of the Interior Czech Republic
- Ministerstvo vnitra České republiky

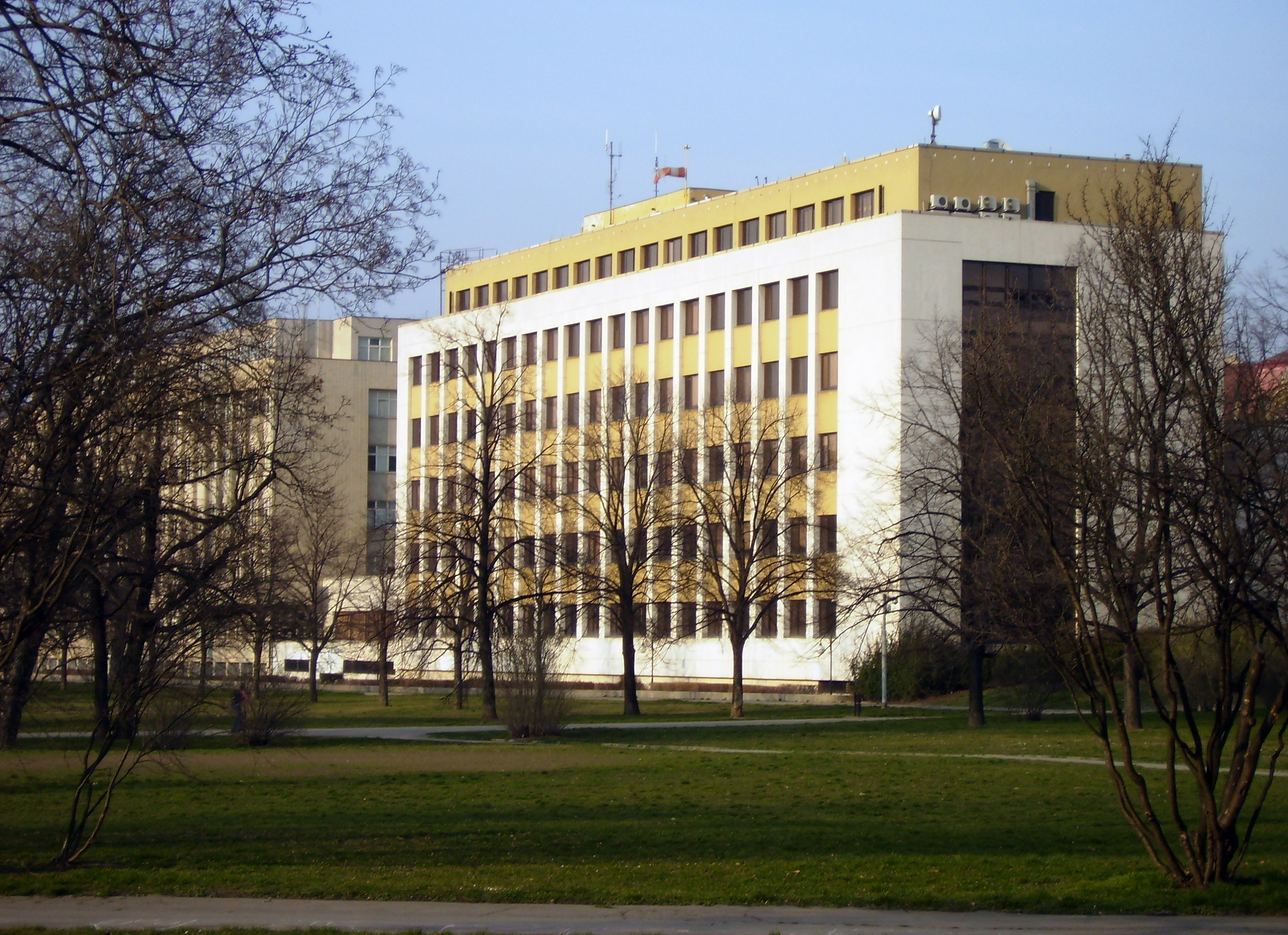
- Headquarters of the Ministry of the Interior in Prague

Agency overview
- Formed: 1969
- Headquarters: Prague 7; 50°5′54.65″N 14°25′18.86″E
- Agency executive: Lubomír Metnar, Minister of the Interior
- Website: www.mvcr.cz

The Ministry of the Interior of the Czech Republic (Czech: Ministerstvo vnitra České republiky) is a government ministry tasked with responsibilities in public and internal security, citizenship, identity cards and social security numbers, as well as travel, border, immigration control and civil service among others. The ministry has under its jurisdiction police, Office for Foreign Relations and Information (ÚZSI), fire department and Czech Post.

The current Minister of the Interior is Lubomír Metnar, in office since 15 December 2025.

== Responsibilities ==
- Internal security
- Citizenship, identity cards, social security numbers
- Public archives and collections
- Firearms regulation
- Fire services
- Travel, borders, immigration control

== See also ==
- Law enforcement in the Czech Republic
- Police of the Czech Republic
- Crime in the Czech Republic
- Human trafficking in the Czech Republic
- Gun politics in the Czech Republic
