= Gun law in the Czech Republic =

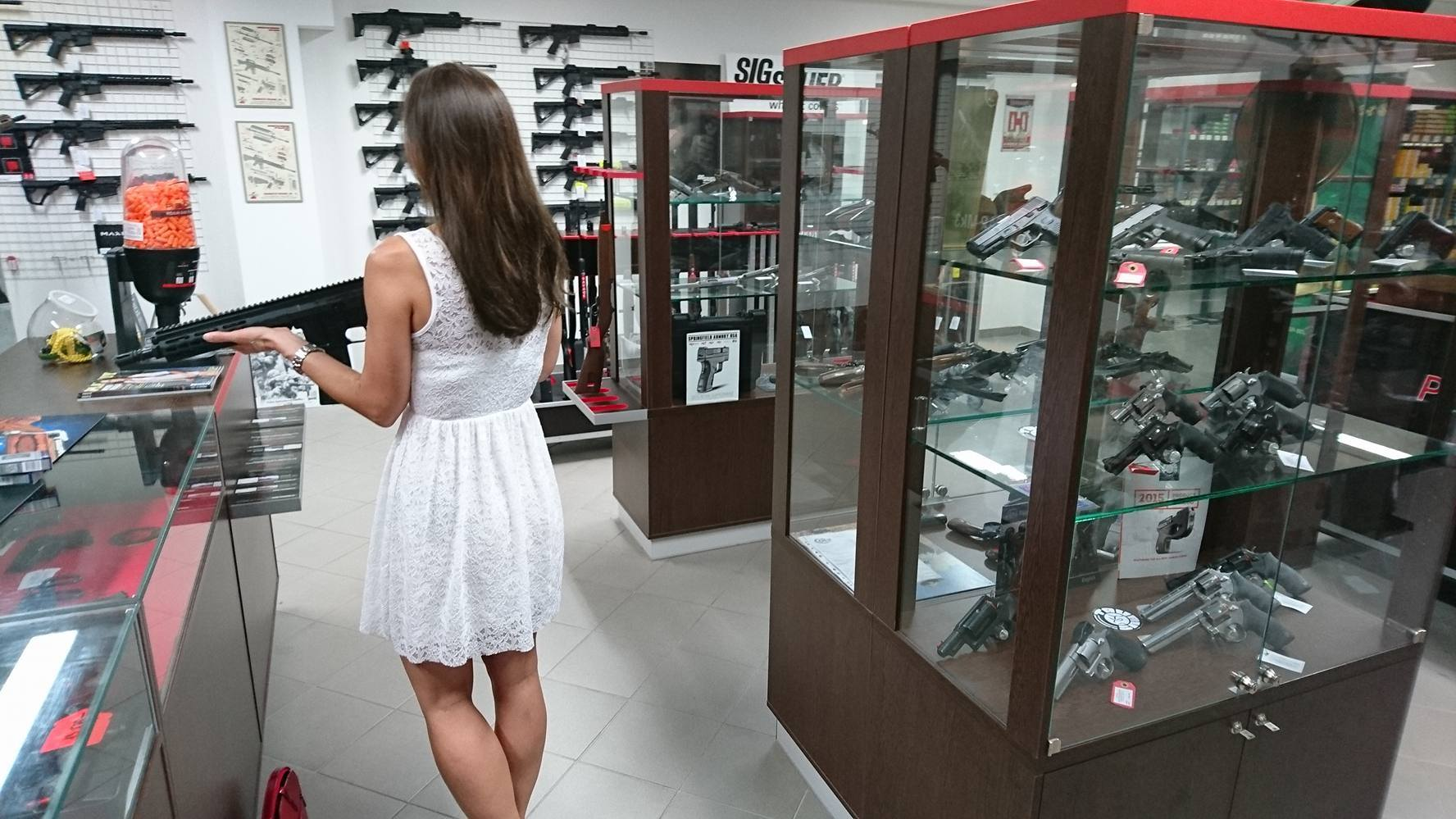
A gun shop in Prague showing a typical selection of locally most popular types of firearms

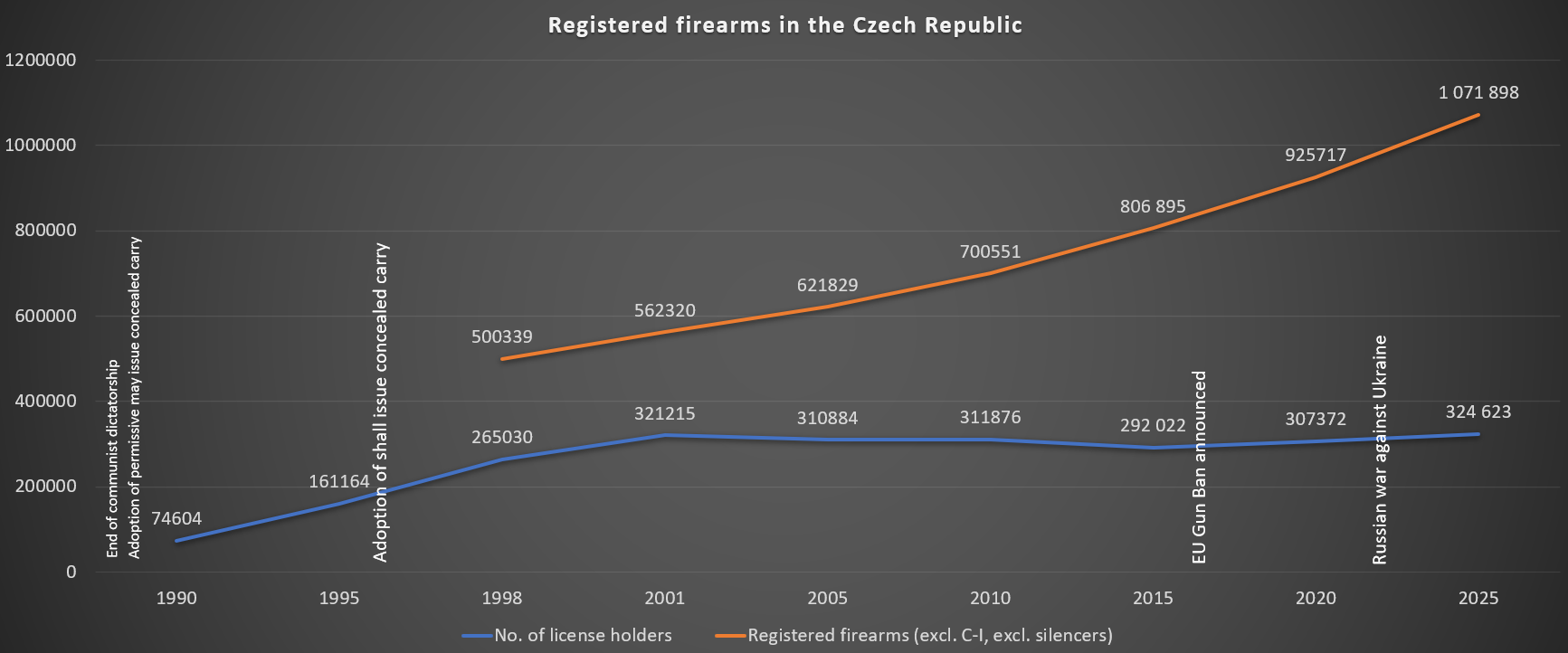
Total number of gun owners and registered firearms in the Czech Republic since the fall of communism

Gun laws in the Czech Republic adhere to the European Firearms Directive. Legal accessibility is comparable to those EU and EFTA countries which consider firearms to be primarily tools of individual or collective safety (i.e. Switzerland, Austria, Poland, Baltic states, Finland) and not just sporting instruments (see Gun laws in the European Union).

Right to keep and bear arms is considered to be an attribute of liberty in the country. It is explicitly recognized in the first Article of the Firearms Act. At the constitutional level, the Charter of Fundamental Rights and Freedoms protects the "right to defend one's own life or life of another person also with arms under conditions stipulated by law".

Firearms are available to any resident subject to acquiring a firearms authorization. Firearm authorizations may be obtained in a way similar to a driving license; by passing a proficiency exam (in Czech language only), medical examination and having clear criminal record. Unlike in most other European countries, Czech firearms legislation also permits citizens to carry concealed weapons for self-defense; 268,323 out of 324,623 gun owners were authorized to carry a concealed firearm by 31 December 2025. The most common reason for firearm possession by Czech gun owners is protection, with hunting and sport shooting being less common. Additionally, people can join government endorsed advanced shooting training courses with their privately owned firearms and become members of the militia-style Designated Reserves.

The beginnings of Czech civilian firearms possession date back to 1421, with the first use of firearms as the primary weapons of the Hussites (see History of Czech civilian firearms possession). Firearms became indispensable tools for the mostly-commoner militia in a war for religious freedom and political independence. Firearms possession became common throughout and after the Hussite wars. The universal right of "all people of all standing to keep firearms at home" was formally affirmed in the 1517 St. Wenceslaus Agreement. Throughout its 600-year history, Czech firearms legislation remained permissive, with the exception of the periods of German Nazi occupation and of the Communist regime.

The English term pistol originated in 15th-century Czech language. Mariánská skála in Ústí nad Labem is Europe's oldest continually-open shooting range, established in 1617.

== History ==
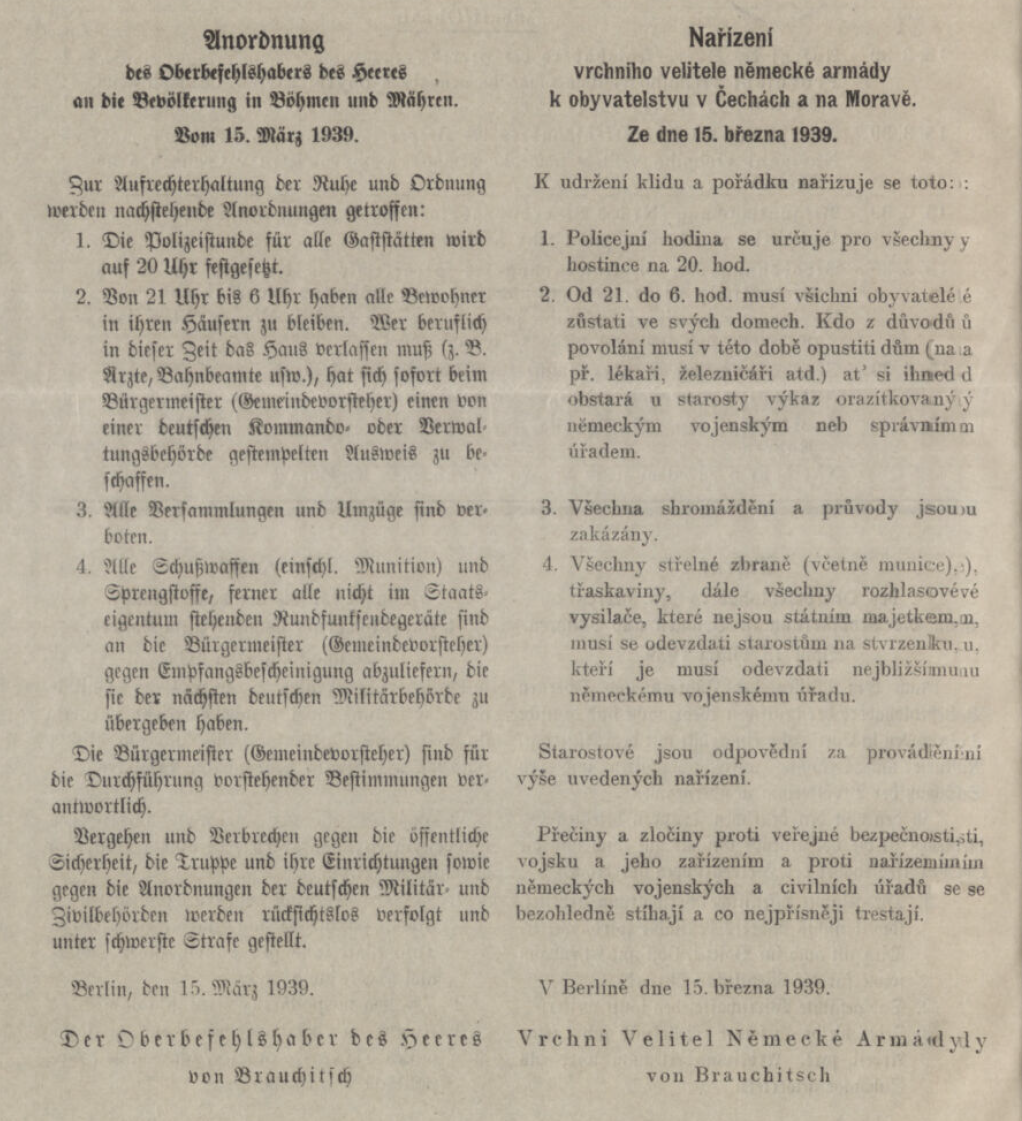
Order of the Supreme Commander of the German Army issuing curfew, banning protests and ordering surrender of firearms and privately owned radio transmitters.

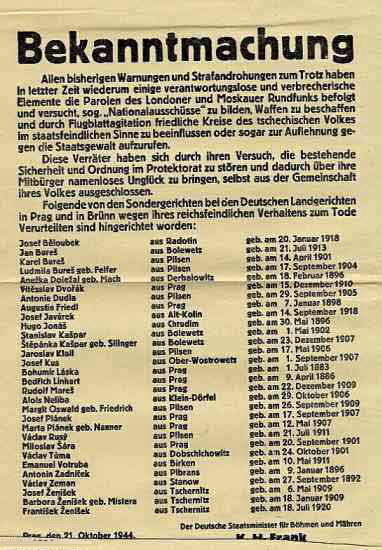
One of many listings of Czechs executed during occupation for distributing anti-Nazi propaganda, forming organizations, and possessing firearms.

On 15 March 1939, the very first enactment of the German occupation authorities banned firearms.

History of Czech civilian firearms possession extends over 600 years back, when local militia became the first force whose military strategy and tactics depended on mass use of firearms in battlefield warfare during the 1419 - 1434 Hussite wars. In 1419, the Hussite revolt against Catholic church and Sigismund, Holy Roman Emperor started. The ensuing Hussite wars over religious freedom and political independence represented a clash between professional Crusader armies from all around Europe, relying mostly on standard medieval tactics and cold weapons, and primarily commoners' militia-based Czech forces which relied on use of firearms. First serving as auxiliary weapons, firearms gradually became indispensable for the Hussite armies. 1421 marks a symbolical beginning of the Czech civilian firearms possession due to two developments: enactment of formal duty of all inhabitants to obey call to arms by provisional elected Government in order to defend the country and first battle in which Hussite Taborite militia employed firearms as the main weapons of attack.

Universal right to keep arms was affirmed in 1517 Wenceslaus Agreement. In 1524 the Enactment on Firearms was passed, establishing rules and permits for carrying of firearms. Firearms legislation remained permissive until the 1939-1945 German occupation. The 1948-1989 period of Communist dictatorship marked another period of severe gun restrictions.

Permissive firearms legislation returned in 1990s after the fall of Communist regime. Today, the "right to acquire, keep and bear arm" is explicitly recognized in the first Article of the Firearms Act. On constitutional level, the Charter of Fundamental Rights and Freedoms includes the "right to defend own life or life of another person also with arms".

== Article 6(4) of the Charter of Fundamental Rights and Freedoms ==
Czech Constitutional Charter of Fundamental Rights and Freedoms Article 6(4) states that "the right to defend own life or life of another person also with arms is guaranteed under conditions set out in the law."

Media dubbed the provision "Czech Republic's second amendment" both in connection with the protection of the right to keep and bear arms in the US constitution and due to the fact that before approval of this provision, the Czech Charter of Fundamental Rights and Freedoms had only been amended once since adoption in 1992.

The provision is interpreted as guaranteeing legal accessibility of arms in a way that must ensure possibility of effective self-defense and as constitutional stipulation which underscores the individual right to be prepared with arms against an eventual attack, i.e. that courts cannot draw a negative inference from the fact that a defender had been preparing to avert a possible attack with use of weapons.

== 2026 Firearms Law ==
The right to acquire, keep and bear firearms is guaranteed under conditions set by this law.

— Article 1 Subsection 1 of the Czech Firearms Act

Firearms Act
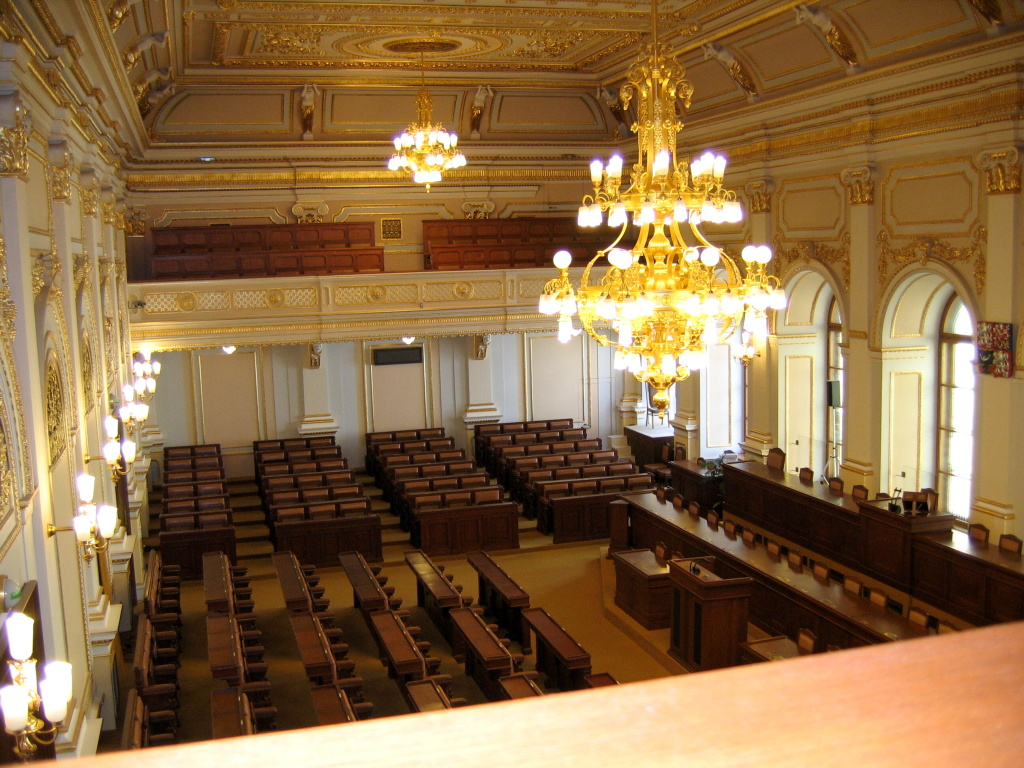

Parliament of the Czech Republic
- Long title: Act on Firearms and Ammunition
- Citation: No. 90/2024 Coll.
- Passed by: Chamber of Deputies
- Passed: 26 January 2024
- Passed by: Senate
- Passed: 6 March 2024
- Signed by: President Petr Pavel
- Signed: 22 March 2024
- Commenced: 1 January 2026

Legislative history

Initiating chamber: Chamber of Deputies
- Bill citation: Chamber Bill No. 465 (9th Legislature)
- Introduced by: Fiala Government; Represented by Vít Rakušan, Minister of the Interior
- Rapporteur: Petr Letocha
- Introduced: 5 June 2023
- Distributed to members: 5 June 2023
- Committee responsible: Security Committee
- First reading: 24 October 2023
- Second reading: 12 December 2023
- Third reading: 26 January 2024
- Voting summary: 151 voted for; None voted against; 18 abstained

Revising chamber: Senate
- Received from the Chamber of Deputies: 8 February 2024
- Rapporteur: Václav Láska
- Committee responsible: Foreign Affairs, Defence and Security Committee
- Passed: 6 March 2024
- Voting summary: 66 voted for; 1 voted against; 8 abstained

Repeals
- 2002 Firearms Act (No. 119/2002 Coll.)

Related legislation
- Government Regulation No. 504/2025 Coll. on the registration and maintenance of data in the central firearms register and on the establishment of templates for certain documents in the field of firearms, ammunition, and explosives Government Regulation No. 351/2025 Coll. on the determination of a list of diseases, defects, or conditions that exclude or limit medical fitness, and on the requirements for medical assessments pursuant to the Firearms and Ammunition Act and the Munitions Act Government Regulation No. 238/2025 Coll. on the Conduct of Examinations under the Firearms and Ammunition Act Government Regulation No. 187/2025 Coll. on Technical Requirements and Other Specifications for Certain Firearms, Ammunition, and Shooting Ranges, and for the Security of Firearms and Ammunition
- Status: In force

A new firearms act was approved in 2024 and became effective on 1 January 2026, thus replacing the 2002 Firearms Act. In the first Article, the law guarantees the right to acquire, keep and bear firearms under the conditions stipulated within the Firearms Act. The law abandonded previous model of licences which were subject to periodical renewal, and instead introduced a life-time authorization, provided that the authorized person continually fulfills required conditions. Once a person obtains the authorization, the law is relatively permissive as regards both the type of firearms that become legally accessible, as well as possibility of their concealed carry for personal protection. At the same time, there is a robust system of central registration of firearm authorization holders (Central registry of firearms) that is interlinked with databases of civil infractions and criminal convictions. Central registry of firearms is also connected to an electronic healthcare system, whereby providers of healthcare are aware of their patient's firearms authorization and are legally bound to inform the authorities in case of a change of medical status that would be incompatible with possession of firearms (which is precisely defined in legislation).

=== Types of authorizations ===
There are two types of firearms authorizations:

- General
- Expanded, the holders of which are authorized to carry a concealed firearm. It is also required for persons who hold the post of armorer or designated person for a professional license holder.

=== Obtaining an authorization ===
An applicant applies for a firearms authorization at a police station that specializes in administrative proceedings regarding civilian firearms. If the conditions of residency, age, competence (law), qualification, health clearance, criminal integrity and personal reliability are met and a fee of 3.000 CZK (US$ 138.38) is paid, the authorization shall be issued in no more than thirty days. The authorization is issued for a lifetime, provided that the holder presents a medical certificate issued by their general practitioner every five years, and that they fulfill all legal conditions on ongoing basis.

==== Age ====
Minimum age requirement for the general authorization is:

- 15 years, if the applicant is
  - a secondary school student in a field that includes instruction in hunting, gunsmithing, sport shooting, security and law, or military science, or in a similar field that includes the handling of weapons, or a secondary school that provides sport shooting or similar extracurricular activities outside of school hours, or
  - a member of an association engaged in sports shooting or similar activities, provided that such association holds a professional firearms license.
- 18 years.

Minimum age requirement for expanded authorization is 21 years.

==== Health clearance ====
Applicant (authorization holder) must be cleared by his general practitioner in line with requirements precisely defined in the law. The health check includes probes into the applicant's anamnesis (i.e. medical history) and a complete physical screening (including eyesight, hearing, balance). The doctor shall request examination by a specialist (e.g. psych eval) in case it is necessary to exclude illnesses or handicaps stated in the respective governmental regulation.

A person who had been institutionalized for compulsory treatment or protective detention, a person whose criminal or civil infraction proceedings were stopped due to criminal insanity, and a person who was involuntarily hospitalized because they posed an immediate and serious threat to themself or their surroundings and showed signs of mental disorder, can be medically cleared only by an expert statement issued by a court expert in the respective field.

==== Criminal integrity ====
The enactment specifies the amount of time that must elapse after serving a punishment for particular groups of crimes. Persons convicted of selected crimes, including public endangerment, participation in organized crime group or murder, never regain criminal integrity for the purposes of the firearms act. For other crimes, the time limits are between 20 years to 3 years from the moment the sentence was served (including alternative sentences). Foreign convictions are treated equally.

==== Personal reliability ====
Apart from criminal integrity, the law further requires "personal reliability". This is precisely defined in the law.

A person is not considered reliable for example if:

- They agreed to conditional suspension of charges in criminal proceedings (i.e. there is no criminal conviction), until the probation period ends.
- Excessive use of alcohol or abuse of drugs.
- Being convicted of more than one civil infraction in specified areas of law within past three years, if nature of the infractions make the person dangerous to internal security and safety.

==== Qualification ====
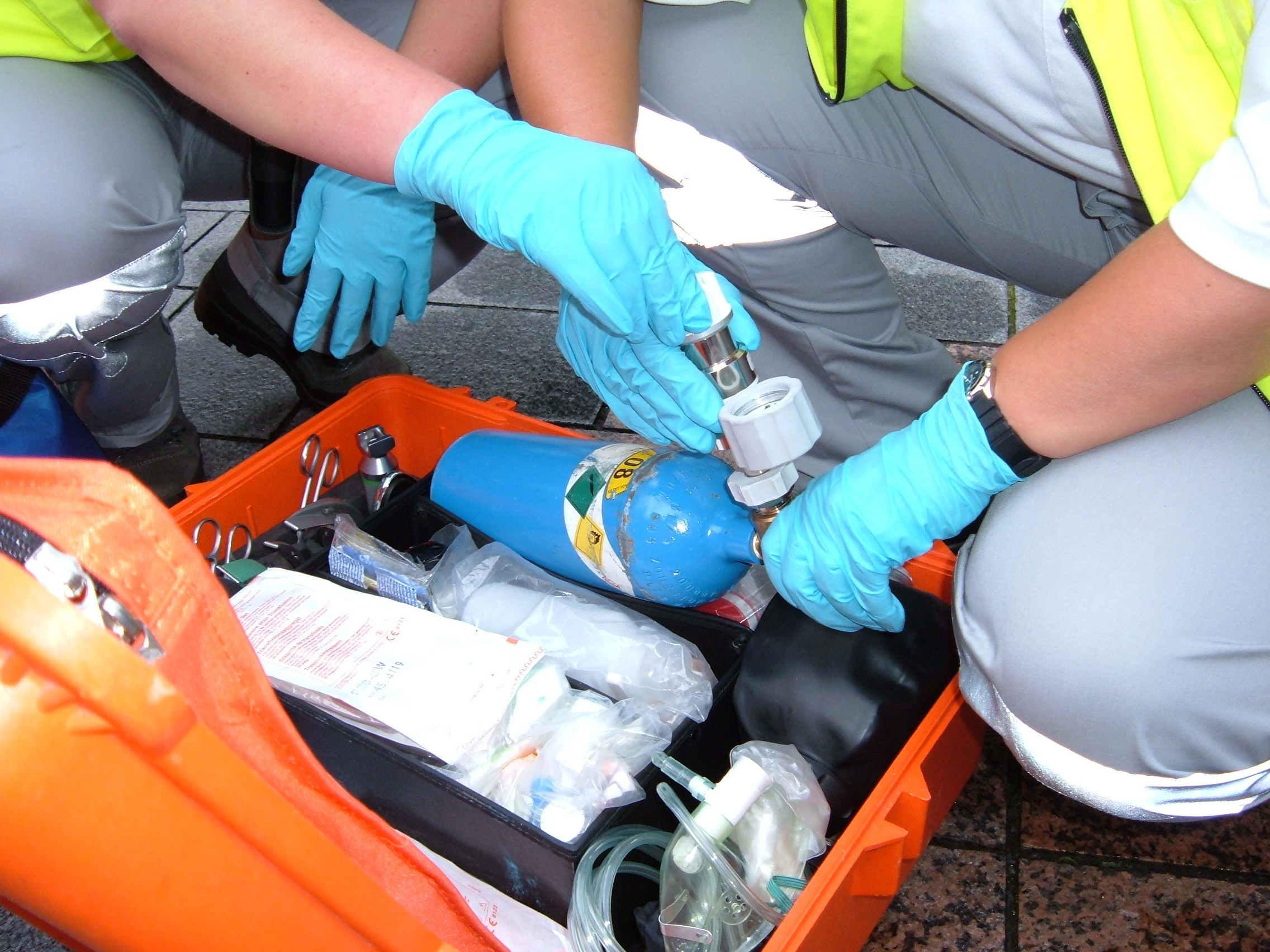
Apart from gun legislation, the theoretical part of the exam focuses also on first aid.

Obtaining the authorization requires passing a theoretical and practical exam, both in Czech language with no interpreter being allowed. The theoretical exam consists of a written test of 30 multiple choice questions (created and distributed by the Ministry of the Interior). The test deals with knowledge of firearms legislation, knowledge of legislation related to legitimate use of firearm (e.g. self-defense), general knowledge of firearms and ammunition, and first aid. The required score for general and expanded authorization differs.

Practical exam verifies ability to handle a firearm safely and shooting.

==== Obtaining of an authorization by a foreigner ====
The law distinguishes foreign residents according to their country of origin. For selected foreign residents, authorization is shall-issue as same as for Czech citizens, while for others it is a may-issue.

- Shall-issue
  - foreigners from countries of the EU, (and their family members, if having been granted long-term residency)
  - foreigners from NATO countries
  - foreigners having been granted permanent residency in the Czech Republic and long-term EU residency or long-term residency in other state of EU and longterm residency in the Czech Republic (and their family members, if having been granted long-term residency)
  - persons having been granted international asylum in the Czech Republic
- May-issue
  - other foreigners (no appeal possible against decision of appropriate police department to deny authorization).

Persons having residence also in another EU country must provide documentation showing that they are allowed to own a firearm therein when they want to obtain firearms of category R1, R2 or R3.

=== Categories of guns ===
Under the current gun law, guns, ammunition and some accessories are divided into six categories:

- Firearms subject to registration
  - R1 - Restricted firearms, which may be obtained only by professional firearms license holders. This category includes for example select-fire firearms, firearms with bore of 20mm or larger, firearms masked as other objects, etc.
  - R2 - Restricted firearms, which may be obtained by firearms authorization holders subject to shall-issue exemption permit. This category includes for example semi-automatic firearms made by conversion from a select-fire firearm, firearms with magazine capacity over 20 (short guns) or 10 (long guns) rounds.
  - R3, which can be obtained by firearms authorization holders subject to shall-issue permit. This category includes for example semi-automatic firearms, shotguns with barrel lengths lower than 600mm.
  - R4, which can be obtained by firearms authorization holders. This category includes firearms that are not part of other categories.
  - PO, which can be obtained by persons who were registered as authorized for such firearms (lower requirements than firearms authorization). This category includes for example single or double barrel black powder firearms, firearms deactivated in line with EU Regulations, air guns with bore larger than 6,35mm (with exception of airsoft and paintball).
- Firearms not subject to registration:
  - NO, which can be obtained by any resident older than 18 years. This category includes for example historical firearms, air guns with bore of 6,35mm or smaller, airsoft and paintball guns.

=== Using firearms and shooting ranges ===
Shooting is permitted only within licensed shooting ranges or when allowed by other laws, e.g. hunting or self-defense. Shooting of blank rounds and projectiles with energy lower than 50J is permitted in a place where it does not threaten life, health, property and public order

There are about two hundred shooting ranges opened for the public. Any adult can visit such a range and shoot from available weapons. A person without firearms authorization has to be supervised (if younger than 18, then by a person at least 21 years old who has been a holder of firearms authorization for at least 3 years).

=== Rules on open and concealed carry ===
Gun safes for visitors at a Czech courthouse

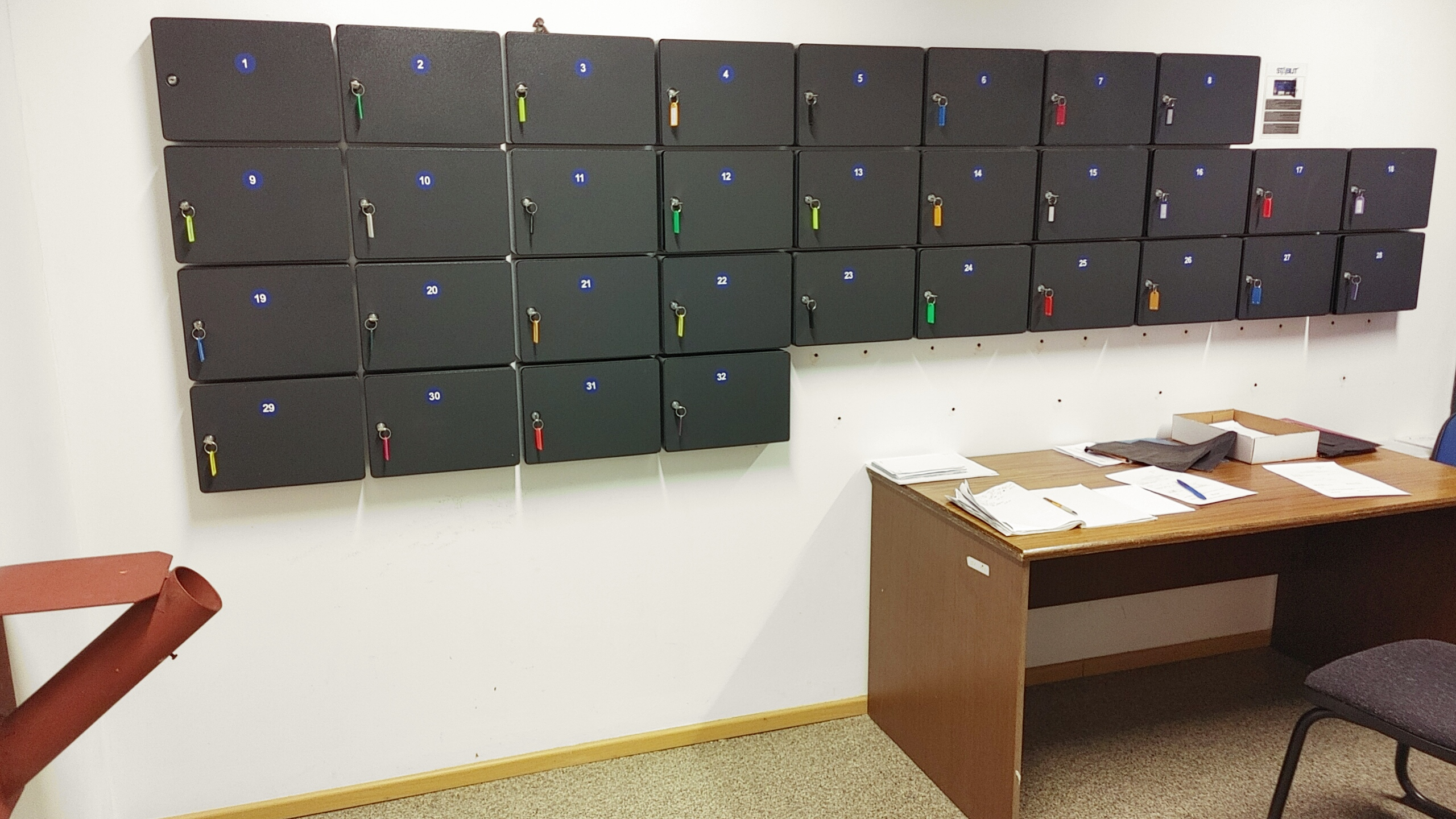
Gun safes for civilian firearms at a courthouse in Prague. It is forbidden to carry any weapons within a courthouse. Visitors can leave their firearms at gun safes upon entry, before undergoing airport-style security check.

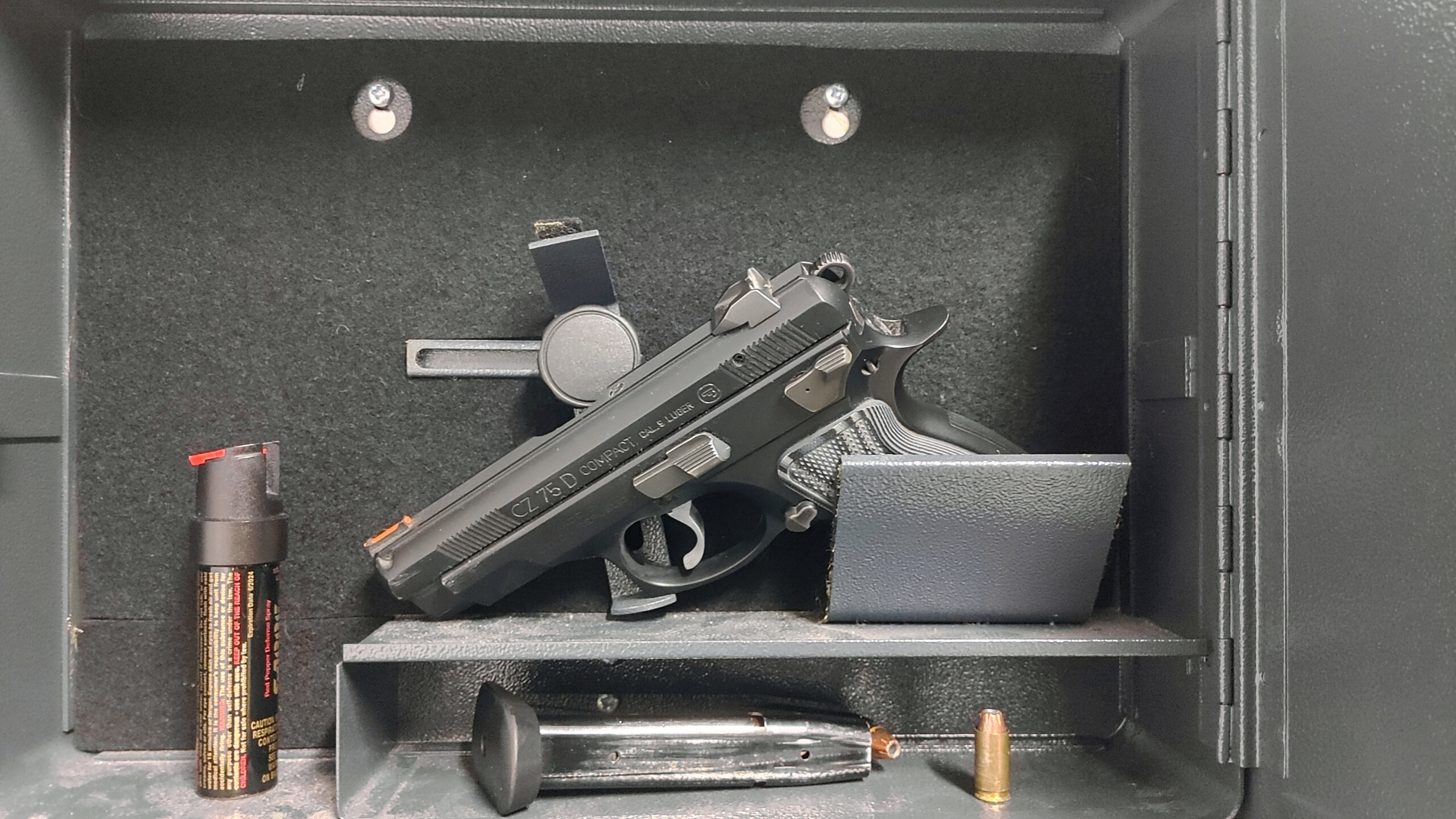
Visitor's unloaded pistol and a pepper spray within a courthouse gun safe

Carrying of firearms is regulated only within publicly accessible places where a person have with them either loaded firearm or visible firearm.

- Concealed carry is the legal default and can be performed by holders of expanded authorization.
- Open carry is possible:
  - Within a professional gun license holders' premises, shooting range, or in other clearly confined areas where firearms are handled with the consent of the owner, lessee, or operator. This is possible only for holders of expanded authorization.
  - When an authorization holder participates in an event or perform an activity in which weapons are normally used, and if the manner of carrying the weapon is appropriate to the nature of the event or activity. Open carry events or activities can only be of the following nature: (1) cultural activities, in particular film or theater activities, reconstructions of historical battles or similar events, or commemorative events, (2) instruction or training in the use of weapons, (3) sports shooting or similar leisure activities, (4) hunting or similar activities in accordance with other legal regulations.
  - Unloaded open carry is possible for participants of above mentioned events or activities, when they are moving to and from location of such activity, if the chosen mode of transport allows it and if it is customary in view of local conditions or if such transport can be considered appropriate to the nature of the event or activity.

Carrying firearm while intoxicated is illegal and can lead to heavy fines and loss of the firearms authorization. Police sometimes conduct intoxication tests of open-carrying hunters.

The law does not include any "gun-free zones" provisions, apart from general prohibition of firearm carry during protests and demonstrations. Public authorities that enact and practically enforce ban on firearm carrying within their premises are legally bound to provide option for storing a short firearm upon entry (either in a safe compliant or with a police officer).

The Czech Republic is a relatively safe country: Prague, with the highest crime rate in the country, still ranks as one of the safest capitals in the European Union. Considering the number of expanded authorizations, there are over 268,000 people who can legally carry a firearm for self-defense, of which over 210.000 people do so at least sometimes, according to a 2024 survey.

=== Ammunition and magazine restrictions ===
Ammunition may be purchased only by a firearms authorization holder. Owners of PO and NO category fiearms can also purchase ammunition suitable for their firearm. Hollow point bullets for use in short firearms are subject to shall-issue exemption permit. For use in long firearms, hollow point bullets are treated the same as other types of ammunition. There are no caliber restrictions up to 20mm (apart from signal weapons). Firearms with calber larger than 20mm are classified as R1 restricted. High-penetrating (armor-piercing) ammunition is classified S1 restricted. Special safe storage requirements apply for those having more than 500, 10,000 and 20,000 cartridges.

Magazines with 10/20 rounds for use in long/short firearms may be used subject to shall issue exemption permit.

=== Professional firearms licences ===
There are three types of professional firearms licenses:

- ZL1, available only to business license holders. This license allows manufacturing, sale, storing, transport of firearms.
- ZL2, available only to business license holders. This license allows handling of firearms other than those under ZL1 license. Requirements to obtain ZL2 are lower than for ZL1.
- ZL3, for other than business purposes (not for profit). This license allows holder to perform an activity for a specific purpose for which a ZL1 or ZL2 firearms license would otherwise be required. Requirements to obtain ZL3 are lower than for ZL2.

=== Red flag seizure ===
Under the red flag provision the police may suspend firearms authorization and/or issue a decision on seizure of firearms if:

- the holder was charged with committing intentional crime and there is a risk of loss or misuse of the firearm, or
- the holder has been declared missing, or
- there is a suspicion that the state of health of the person handling them poses a threat to life or health in connection with such handling, or
- if proceedings are being conducted against the holder for the revocation of authorization under the Firearms Act, or
- if seizure is necessary to fulfill the purpose of the police inspection under the Firearmss Act, or
- if they are being handled by a foreigner who may be denied or prevented from entering the territory of the Czech Republic under the Act on the Residence of Foreigners in the Czech Republic, or
- if sanctions are imposed on the person handling them under the Act on the Implementation of International Sanctions or under the Sanctions Act, or
- if the opinion or information of a public authority indicates that the person handling them poses a serious threat to internal order or security.

If the seized firearm or ammunition is not immediately surrendered or if the police are not allowed to take possession of it, a police officer may enter a dwelling or other premises for the purpose of seizure.

== 2021 Designated Reserves Act ==
Designated Reserves

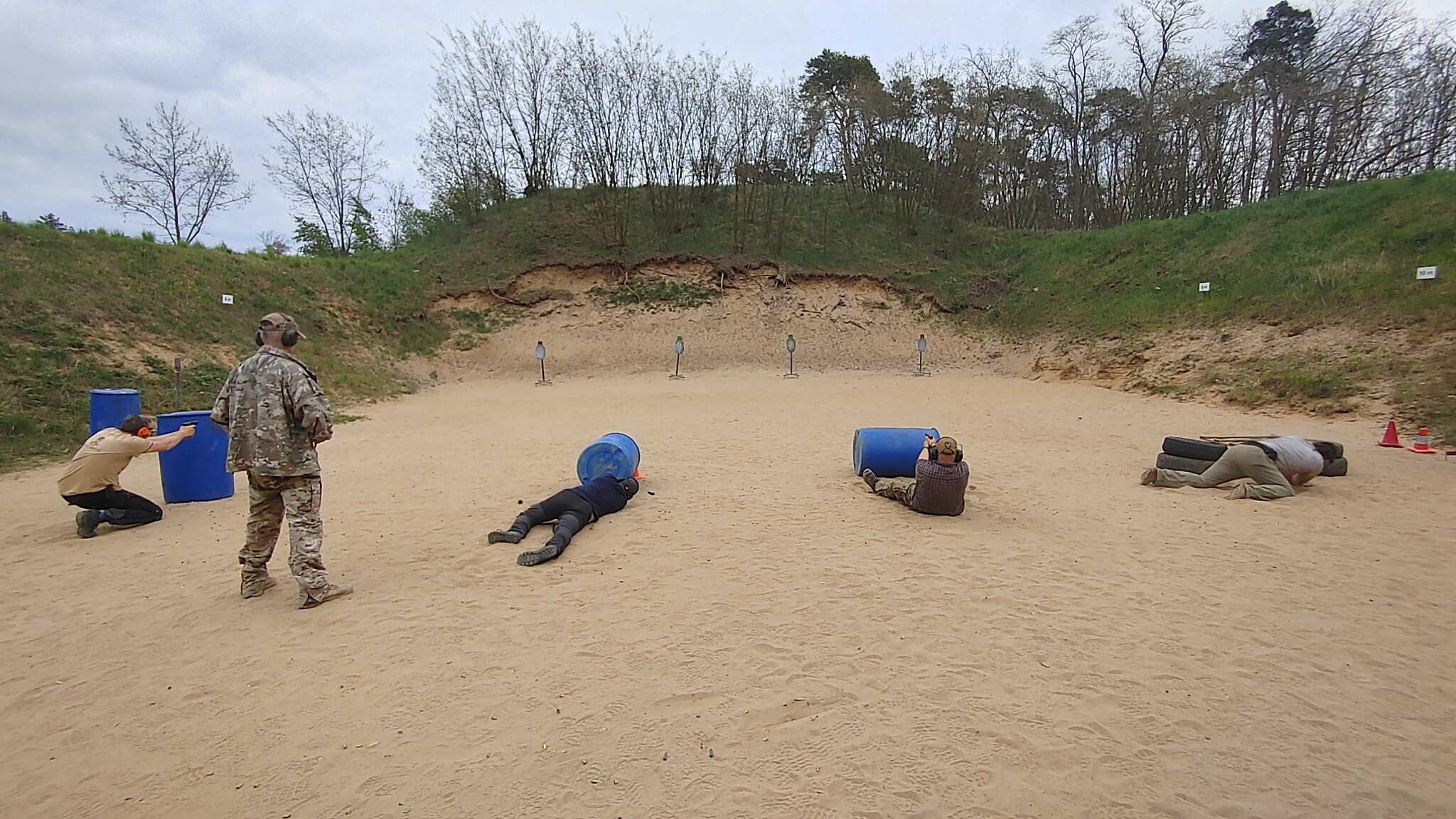
Level 1 training - shooting from concealment.

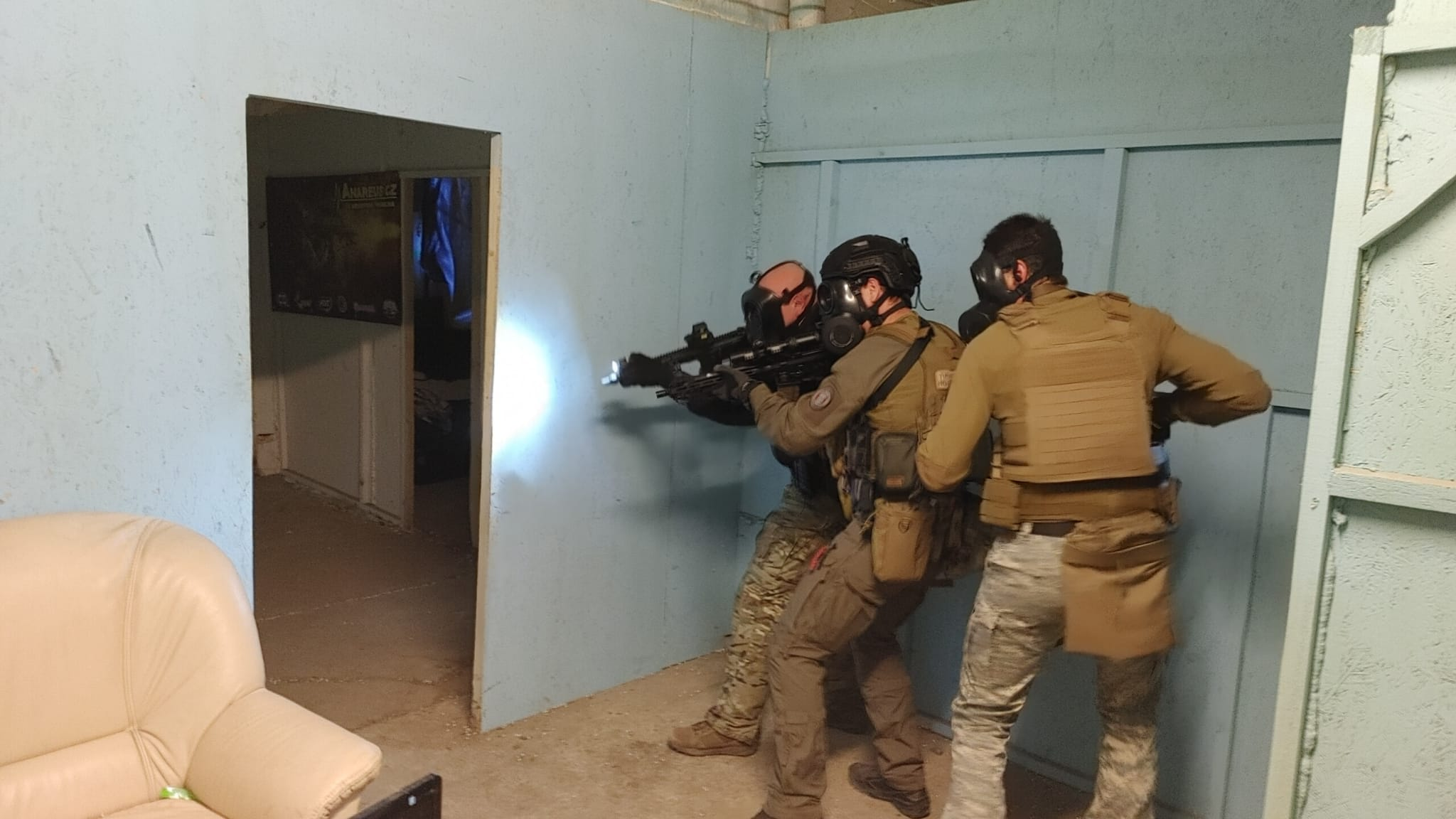
Level 3 training - teamwork elimination of active shooter (FX simmunition CQB combat).

Designated Reserves were established in 2021 by Act No. 14/2021 Coll., on the handling of weapons in certain cases affecting the internal order or security of the Czech Republic. The Act's number 14/21 symbolically refers to the 600th anniversary of civilian firearms possession in the country. The Reserves comprise civilians armed with their private firearms.

Members of the reserves undergo training within a "a system of firearms training, the purpose of which is to improve the knowledge, abilities and skills of persons authorised to handle firearms for the purpose of ensuring internal order or the security of the Czech Republic". Within the system, private companies approved by authorities provide advanced shooting training to firearm owners that have expanded firearms license. After passing a set of requirements and taking an oath, the participants become part of the Designated Reserve of the State, whereby they may be called up with their private firearms to support the work of police or armed forces in a crisis event. While the law anticipates founding of firearms training for both internal security as well as defense, as of 2026 only the former was in place.

== Self defense with firearms ==
Czech criminal law defines self-defense (nutná obrana, lit. "necessary defense") as a person's action which averts an ongoing or imminent attack and which is not manifestly (lit: "obviously grossly") disproportionate to the manner of the attack. This definition stems from the Article 29 of the Act No. 40/2009 Coll., the Criminal Code.

Self-defense is considered to be an individual human right protected under Article 2(4) of the Constitution and Articles 2(3) and 6(4) of the Charter of Fundamental Rights and Freedoms. There is no specific provisions regarding self-defense with use of a weapon. Same rules apply in case of unarmed defense or defense with any type of weapon.

A number of successful defensive uses of firearms or other weapon is being cleared as legitimate self-defense by authorities every year without raising wider public concern, including for example a 2014 shooting of an attacker by a bartender in Hořovice, or a 2014 shooting of an aggressive burglar in a garage by homeowner in Čimice.

== Gun culture and societal attitudes ==
You who know me know that advocating legal gun ownership is a matter of principle for me, it's a matter of protecting liberty. The freedom to be able to defend oneself effectively with arms in the event of an attack, the freedom to sport with a legally owned firearm, to regulate game by hunting, and, de facto, to increase the defensibility of the Czech Republic as such. Which, as Minister for Defence, I will defend, and it is logical that my position has not changed.

— 2021-2025 Minister of Defence Jana Černochová (January 2024)

Statistically, the most typical gun owner is a university-educated 45–59 years old male with above-average income who owns three firearms and practices concealed carry for self-defense. In 2024, 33% of adults were "thinking about" obtaining category E (concealed carry) firearms license, typically for the purpose of personal and family protection. 49% of population consider firearms possession as beneficial, while 45% hold the opposite view. Czech Republic's strong tradition in firearms manufacturing and competition shooting contributes to generally favorable attitudes to the legality of gun ownership.

Firearms possession was banned during German Nazi occupation and then allowed only to those deemed loyal during the Communist regime. Today, the right to be armed is seen as an attribute of liberty in the country. The 2021-2025 Government Policy Declaration undertakes to "preserve the rights of legal gun owners". 28% of members of the Chamber of Deputies of the Czech Parliament keep firearms; some of them are believed to conceal carry also within the parliament grounds.

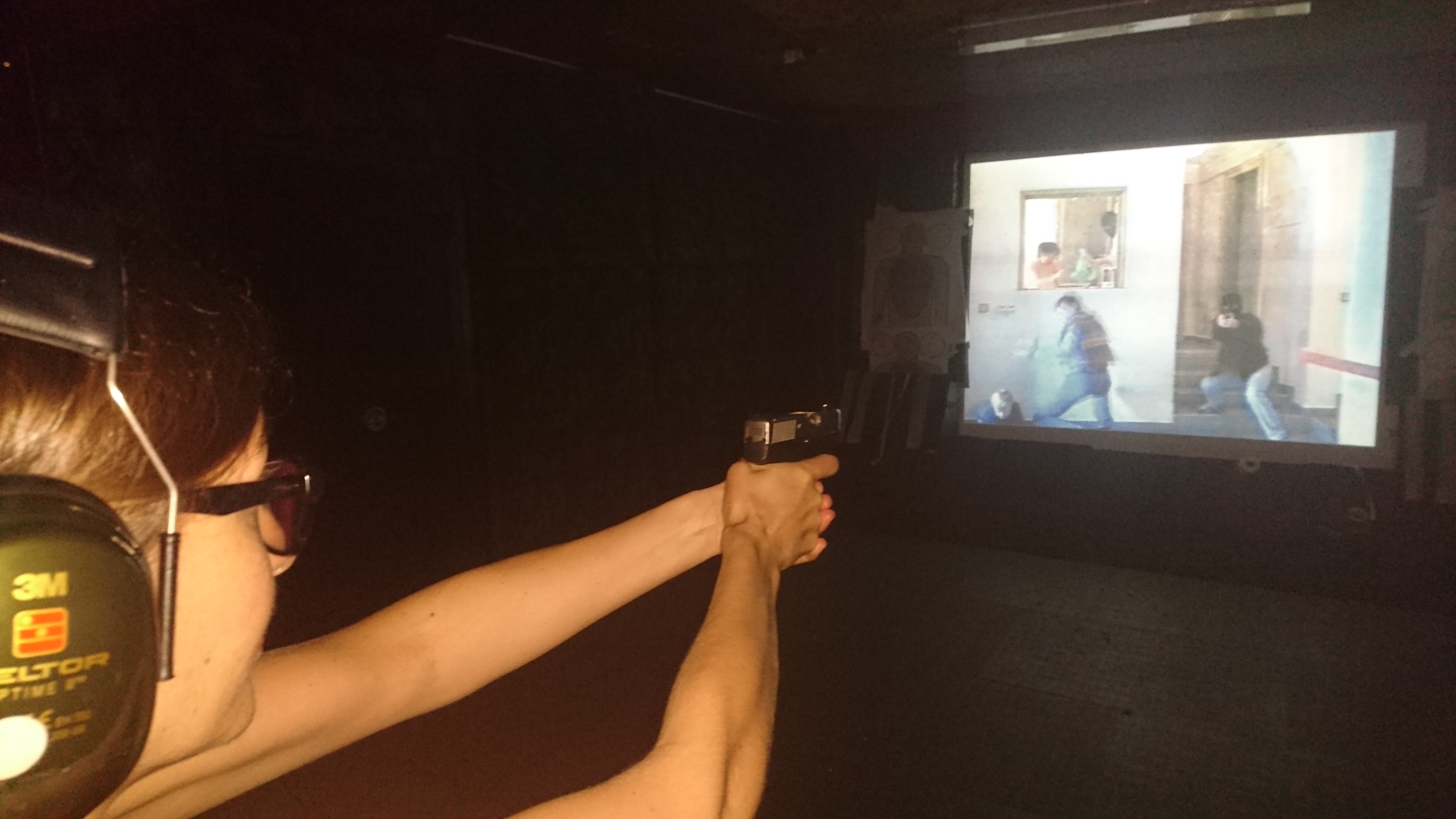
A woman trains real-life defensive gun use scenarios with live ammunition at a video shooting range in Prague, Czech Republic.

The country suffered from a crime wave following the 1989 Velvet Revolution. The subsequent rise of legal gun ownership in the 1990s correlated with general fall in crime. By 2001, some 3% of the population possessed firearms licenses. The number of license holders fell slightly from this point (faster as regards C licenses, while E licenses remained mostly level) until the 2015 EU Gun Ban Proposal, from which point the number of license holders began to rise again (mostly E licenses). The police recorded a tripling of average monthly applications for firearms licenses by the end of 2015 compared to the beginning of that year.

While the number of firearms authorization holders is rising gradually, firearm sales rose even faster in 2015, mostly prompted by the EU efforts to restrict law abiding citizens' access to firearms. Average annual rise in the number of registered firearms amounted to 14,500 guns between 2006 and 2014, there were 54,508 new registered firearms in 2015 alone.

268,000 out of 324,000 (2025) gun owners have self-defense licenses, which permit them to carry concealed firearms for protection (any B or C category firearm, not only pistols). 210.000 people (2024) practice concealed carry for self defense. Following a wave of terror attacks around Europe, a number of politicians as well as security professionals started urging gun owners to practice carrying of firearms in order to be able to contribute to soft targets protection. These included, among many others, the President Miloš Zeman, whose wife obtained E license and a revolver, as well as Libor Lochman, Chief of URNA, the country's main special forces anti-terrorism unit. There are places known for disproportionately high concealed carry rate, such as the Prague Jewish Quarter.

Unlike elsewhere in Europe, there is a relatively high proportion of semi-automatic firearms in the country, which are generally considered better suited for self-defense. The most owned firearms in the country are CZ 75 Compact and Glock 17. Other popular guns include 1911 clones and semi-automatic rifles made by Czech manufacturers, especially vz. 58 and AR-15 (of which there are 5 domestic manufacturers). There are relatively fewer revolvers, mostly from US manufacturers such as Smith & Wesson and Colt, or Czech producers ALFA and Kora.

== Incidents and gun crimes ==
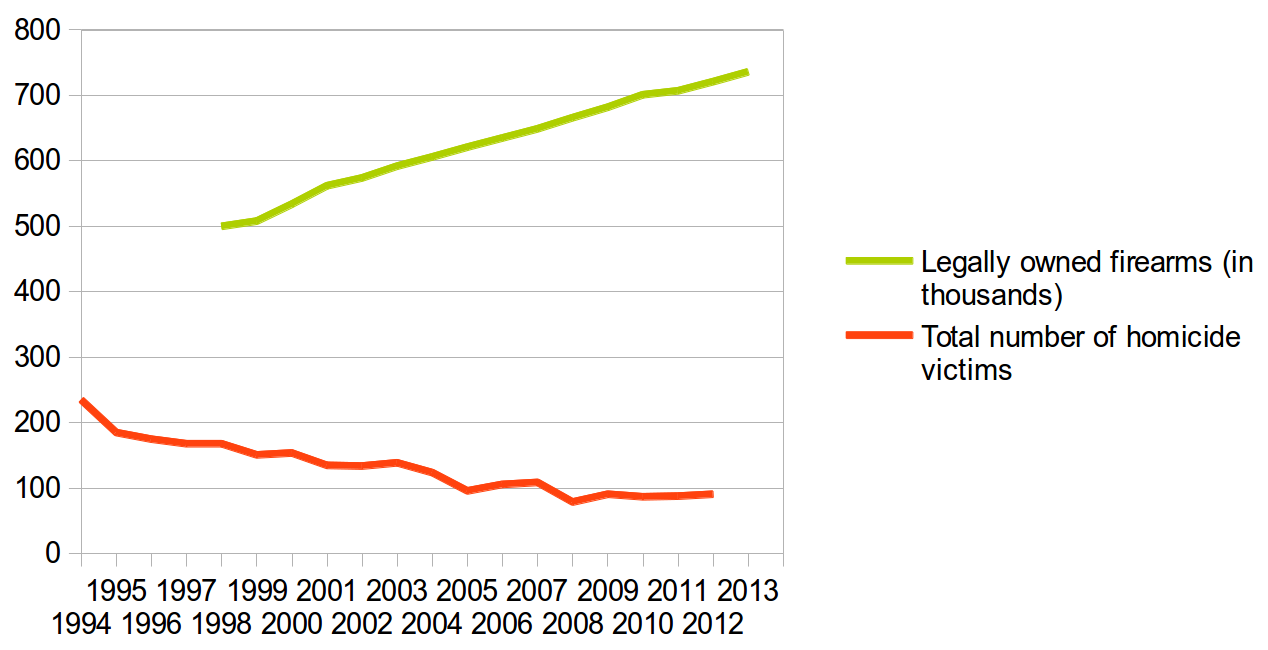
Number of legally owned firearms in the Czech Republic (in thousands) and total number of victims of intentional homicide by any object

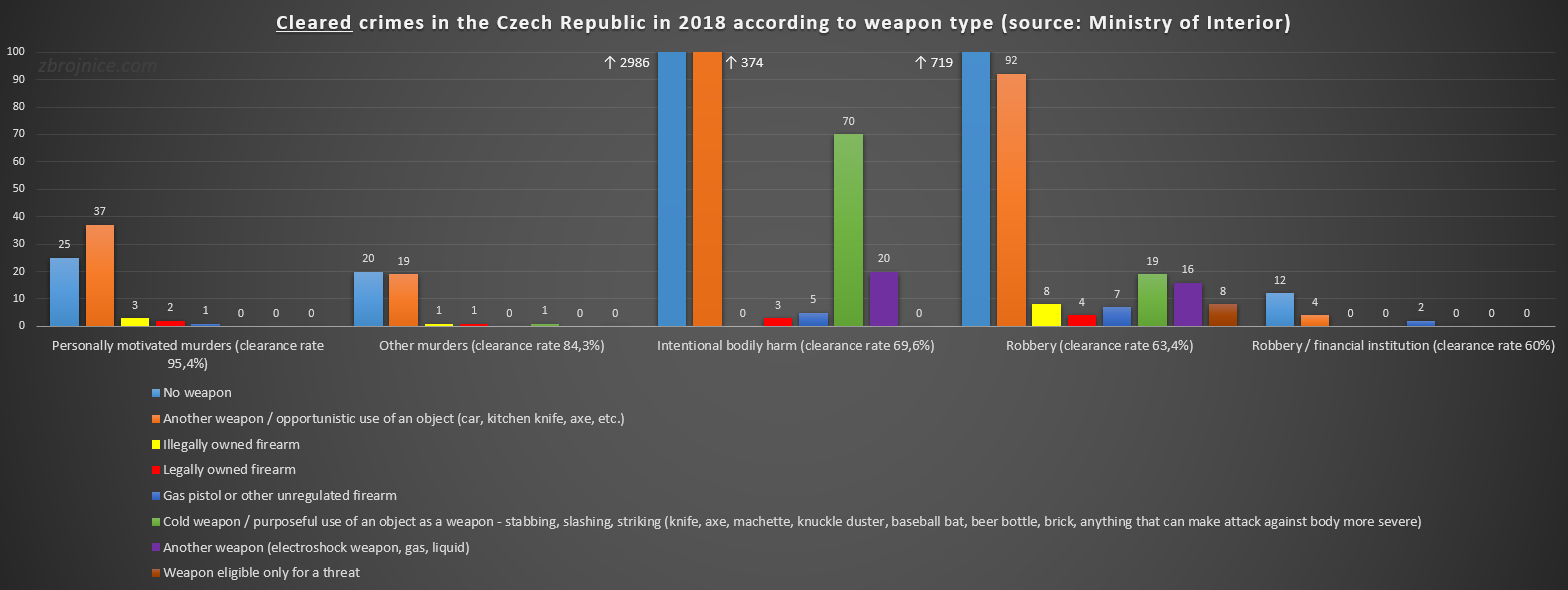
Selected crimes and perpetrator's weapon of choice (2018)

It is generally not common for authorized firearms owners to commit violent crimes with their guns, and most of the gun crimes are committed with illegal weapons that are beyond the control of the law. Annually, police investigate about 500 cases of illegal arming (with or without direct connection to committing other crime).

Police recorded 45 violent crimes (most of them, 17, being "dangerous threats" and 6 homicides - including attempts, mostly intra-family) being committed with legal firearms (A, B, C category) in 2016, down from 71 in 2014 and 51 in 2015 respectively. Meanwhile, illegally possessed firearms (A, B, C category) were used in 71 violent crimes (9 murders) in 2016. When resorting to use of firearms, perpetrators mostly utilize non-lethal free-to-buy D category weapons (see above) that resemble real guns, with 906 such crimes taking place in 2016. Apart from simple threats, the most common crime committed with firearms is robbery. Out of 1.500 robberies recorded in 2016, 153 took place with use of D category free-to-buy non-lethal weapons, 24 with illegally possessed firearms and 3 with legally possessed firearms (out of over 900,000 legally owned firearms).

Czech police records completed and attempted homicides in the same category. The total number of people shot dead (homicides, police action, self defense), without distinction of legal or illegal source of gun, is recorded by CZSO. CZSO recorded 7 gun related assault deaths in 2016, 9 in 2017 and 5 in 2018.

In 2018, police recorded three homicides with legally held firearms including attempts of which one was subsequently ruled self defense and the other was ruled manslaughter with only a probation sentence, leaving a single criminal murder.

Overall, legally held firearms are implicated in about 3.5% of murders including attempts while 7% of the adult male population owns one (adult males are responsible for about 90% of murders in the Czech Republic).

Some examples of crimes perpetrated with a legal firearm include:

- 2005 "Forest Killer", who was planning to go on a killing spree in Prague Metro, which was prevented by his early arrest in connection with his previous "training" murders committed on random hikers in forests. Being a former policeman, the perpetrator had passed a difficult psychological evaluation as part of the police selection procedure.
- 2013 Raškovice shooting, where a 31-year-old schoolteacher invaded house of one of his students, aged 17, with whom he had allegedly been previously intimately involved, and shot the student and her grandparents; the perpetrator had passed psychological evaluation ordered by his general practitioner before getting gun license.
- 2015 Uherský Brod shooting, which led to an introduction of red flag health-related provision in the firearms act.
- 2023 Prague Shooting, perpetrated by a 24-year-old Forest Killer copycat and world history student of the Faculty of Arts of Charles University.

== Other types of weapons ==
There is currently no regulation on other type of weapons such as knives, pepper sprays, batons or electrical paralyzers. These items can be freely bought and carried. Similarly as in the case of firearms, it is prohibited to carry these weapons to court buildings, demonstrations and mass meetings. The Ministry of the Interior officially recommends carrying non-lethal weapons such as pepper sprays, paralyzers, or gas pistols as means of self-defense

The Czech penal code defines "weapon" as "anything that may make an attack against a person more severe". Although there are no restrictions on possession and carrying of weapons, their use in commission of a crime is punishable by stiffer sentences. For example, blackmail carries six months to four years imprisonment, but blackmail with a weapon carries two to eight years imprisonment.
