= Office for Foreign Relations and Information =

Czech governmental intelligence agency

- Úřad pro zahraniční styky a informace
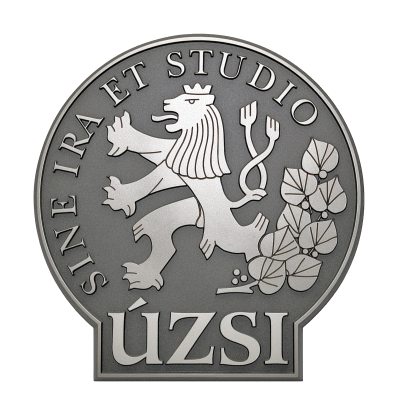
- Seal of ÚZSI

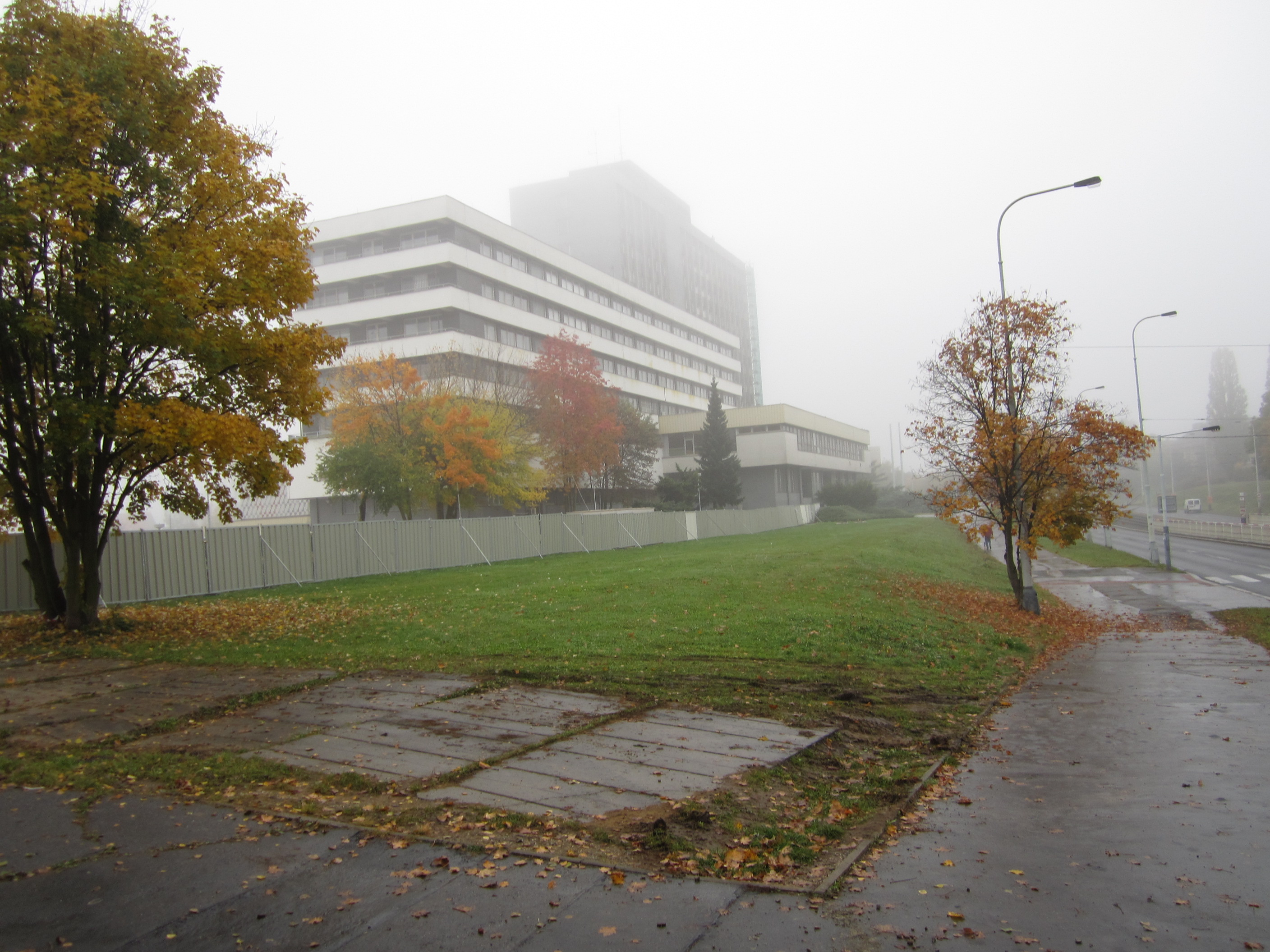
- Headquarters of ÚZSI

Agency overview
- Formed: January 1, 1993; 33 years ago
- Preceding agency: Office for Foreign Relations and Information of the Federal Ministry of the Interior
- Type: Intelligence agency
- Jurisdiction: Government of the Czech Republic
- Headquarters: Prague, Czech Republic; 50°7.54592′N 14°27.76793′E
- Motto: "Sine ira et studio" ("without anger and bias")
- Employees: Unknown
- Minister responsible: Lubomír Metnar, Minister of the Interior
- Agency executive: Vladimír Posolda, Director General
- Parent agency: Ministry of the Interior
- Website: www.uzsi.cz

The Office for Foreign Relations and Information (ÚZSI) (Czech: Úřad pro zahraniční styky a informace) is the main foreign intelligence service of the Czech Republic responsible for the collection, analysis and dissemination of intelligence. It is mandated to provide accurate and timely intelligence to the Government of the Czech Republic that is vital to support and protect foreign and economic policy interests.

The service also protects the country from terrorism, the proliferation of weapons of mass destruction, economic crimes, etc. Powers of the service are determined by the Act N.153/1994 Coll., the Intelligence Services of the Czech Republic Act which also lays out the structure of the organization. Officers of the service are mandated to act in accordance with the agency's code of ethics.

== History ==
The UZSI was located within the portfolio of the Czech Ministry of the Interior before the Act No. 153/1994 Coll. on intelligence services of the Czech Republic which made the service an independent institution. Before the Czech Republic became independent the agency was called the Office for Foreign Relations and Information of the Federal Ministry of the Interior. After the Czech independence, UZSI faced numerous challenges concerning the services development like developing a new framework of their activities, using new technologies and cooperation with foreign intelligence services.

Production had significantly increased after these improvements had been made. Today the intelligence agency is a major player on the international intelligence scene and represents the Czech intelligence community all over the world.

== Organizational structure ==
UZSI is headed by a Director-General who, on the government's consent, is appointed and dismissed by the Minister of the Interior. Czech's Interior minister is accountable to Government for the actions of UZSI. Directors in UZSI include:

- Office of the Director General – who is responsible for Security and Defense, the secretariat of Public Affairs and the Inspection and control department. Directly subordinated to the Director are advisors including the Spokesman of the Office and those who are responsible for the areas of Security and Defence, Inspection and Control.
- Deputy Director for Intelligence and Operations – who is responsible for numerous operational departments which include the Analysis department, the Signals Intelligence department and the foreign department. This director is also responsible for communication and the exchange of intelligence with foreign partners;
- Deputy Director for Logistics – who is accountable for the finance and logistics, communication and information technology, archives and administration, legal affairs, personnel and training.

== Director General ==
The current director of UZSI is Vladimír Posolda. He joined the Czechoslovak Federal Security Information Service in 1990, and worked for the Security Information Service (BIS) until 1998. Between 1998 and 2020, Posolda worked for UZSI, and was Deputy Director of Operations from 2019 until he left in 2021 due to disputes with then-director Marek Šimandl.

Former directors of the agency include:

- Oldřich Černý
- Petr Zeman
- Jiří Lang
- Karel Randák
- Ivo Schwarz
- František Bublan
- Jiří Šašek 2014–2018
- Marek Šimandl
- Petr Mlejnek

== Radio operations ==
According to Langley Pierce's Intercepting Numbers Stations, ÚZSI once operated a shortwave numbers station using the OLX callsign. The station ran under ÚZSI until 1996.

== See also ==
- Security Information Service (BIS)
- Czech Government
