= Human trafficking in the Czech Republic =

== Human trafficking in the Czech Republic ==
Human trafficking in the Czech Republic involves coercion, exploitation, and abuse of vulnerable individuals for the purposes of forced labour, sexual exploitation, and other forms of modern slavery. The country functions as a destination, source, and transit state. Victims include both foreign nationals and Czech citizens. While some are trafficked abroad, domestic trafficking remains a significant concern.

== History ==
Following the collapse of communism in 1989 and the subsequent formation of the Czech Republic in 1993, the country underwent significant political and economic transformation. The transition to a market economy, the lifting of travel restrictions, and increased migration flows contributed to the emergence of human trafficking as a growing issue in the region.

During the 1990s and early 2000s, Czechia became recognized as a country of origin, transit, and destination for victims of trafficking, particularly women trafficked for sexual exploitation. However, systematic data collection and comprehensive legal frameworks were limited in this early period.

In 2003, the Czech government adopted its first National Strategy to Combat Trafficking in Human Beings for the Purpose of Sexual Exploitation. That same year, the Ministry of Interior established a Programme for Support and Protection of Victims of Trafficking, providing legal, psychological, and social support to adult victims regardless of nationality.

Throughout the 2000s and early 2010s, legal reforms increased penalties for trafficking offenses, and more systematic data collection was introduced through annual Status Reports published by the Ministry of Interior. These reports helped inform national policy and identify trends in both sexual and labour trafficking. Czechia was consistently ranked as a "Tier 1" country by the U.S. State Department during much of this period, indicating that it met the minimum standards for combating trafficking.

On 29 March 2017, the Czech Republic ratified the Council of Europe Convention on Action Against Trafficking in Human Beings, which entered into force on 1 July 2017. This marked a significant step toward aligning national legislation with international standards.

In the 2020s, attention has increasingly shifted toward labour exploitation, internal trafficking, and vulnerable groups such as men and migrant workers. According to the Group of Experts on Action against Trafficking in Human Beings (GRETA), Czech authorities identified 90 adult victims between 2019 and 2023, primarily foreign nationals exploited in sectors such as construction, agriculture, and domestic work. No child victims were officially recorded during that time, highlighting ongoing challenges in detection and data collection.

Non-governmental organizations, such as La Strada Czech Republic, have noted an increase in male victims and in newer forms of exploitation, such as “virtual labour” or online-based coercion. Despite progress, GRETA and other international observers continue to call for improved victim identification procedures, broader access to victim services, and strengthened oversight of labour recruitment agencies.

== Victims and trends ==
Between 2019 and 2023, Czech authorities identified 90 adult victims of human trafficking, the majority of whom were foreign nationals. Victims were primarily exploited in sectors such as construction, agriculture, forestry, manufacturing, food processing, and domestic work. No data on child trafficking victims were reported during this period.

According to NGO La Strada Czech Republic, male victims—particularly in cases of labour exploitation and online-based “virtual slavery”—now represent a significant share of the caseload. The organization has emphasized that not all victims are foreign nationals; some are Czech citizens trafficked within the country.

== Legal framework and law enforcement ==
The Czech Republic has amended its Programme for Support and Protection of Victims of Trafficking in Human Beings and has adopted new legislation aimed at curbing illegal work and exploitation.

Law enforcement efforts are coordinated through the Intergovernmental Coordination Group for Combating Trafficking in Human Beings, which now includes the State Labour Inspection Office. The National Centre for Combating Organised Crime has dedicated investigators focused on trafficking cases, and a national correspondent operates within the Supreme State Prosecutor's Office.

In 2023, a major cross-border trafficking network operating between the Czech Republic and Finland was dismantled with the support of Eurojust and Europol. Thirteen suspects were arrested, and over 90 victims were identified. The traffickers used escort websites and transported women from Czechia to Finland for sexual exploitation. Authorities seized cash, apartments, luxury cars, and other assets linked to the operation.

== Protection and victim support ==
Czechia's national victim support program provides shelter, legal aid, and medical care in cooperation with NGOs. La Strada and other organizations offer free assistance to adult victims regardless of nationality or gender.

However, the Group of Experts on Action against Trafficking in Human Beings (GRETA) has expressed concern that victim identification remains closely tied to criminal proceedings. The organization has recommended that identification be based on a multidisciplinary, independent process and that more robust support be provided even to those unable or unwilling to cooperate with law enforcement.

Access to compensation, long-term reintegration support, and safe accommodation varies by region. Victims of labour trafficking often lack awareness of their rights or fear retaliation, which can prevent them from seeking help.

== Prevention and international cooperation ==
The Czech government engages in awareness campaigns and professional training to help prevent trafficking. Preventive measures include informing at-risk communities, monitoring labour conditions, and enhancing oversight of recruitment agencies.

Czechia cooperates with international bodies including the Council of Europe, the European Union, Eurojust, and Europol. It is a party to the Council of Europe Convention on Action against Trafficking in Human Beings, ratified in 2017.

In recent years, international observers have recommended that Czechia invest further in safe reporting mechanisms, improve data collection—especially on children—and proactively investigate non-sexual forms of trafficking, including labour exploitation.

== See also ==
- Human trafficking in Europe
- La Strada International
- Council of Europe Convention on Action against Trafficking in Human Beings
