= Security Information Service =

Intelligence agency of the Czech Republic

- Bezpečnostní informační služba (BIS)
- Seal of the Security Information Service

Agency overview
- Formed: 30 July 1994
- Preceding agencies: Security Information Service of the Czech Republic (1992); (Czechoslovak) Federal Security Information Service
- Jurisdiction: Government of the Czech Republic
- Headquarters: Prague, Czech Republic; 50°3′16.51″N 14°20′11.98″E
- Motto: Audi, Vide, Tace (Hear, See, Be silent)
- Employees: 1,000 (2019 estimate)
- Annual budget: $65 million (as of 2017)
- Agency executive: Michal Koudelka, Director
- Parent agency: Government of the Czech Republic
- Website: www.bis.cz

The Security Information Service (BIS, Czech: Bezpečnostní informační služba) is the primary domestic national intelligence agency of the Czech Republic. It is responsible for collecting, analyzing, reporting and disseminating intelligence on threats to Czech Republic's national security, and conducting operations, covert and overt, both domestically and abroad. It also reports to and advises the Government of the Czech Republic on national security issues and situations that threaten the security of the nation.

The BIS headquarters is located in Stodůlky, Prague 5. The Security Information Service reports directly to the Government, Prime Minister and President of the Czech Republic and is overseen by the Permanent Commission of the Chamber of Deputies. (Note: The official translated name into English is the Permanent Commission on Oversight over the work of the Security Information Service.) It is under the command of the Government and organized militarily.

== Command, control, and organization ==
The BIS is a statutory body under the Act No. 154/1994 Coll., on the Security Information Service and it is strictly apolitical and has limited police powers; BIS can detain, arrest or interrogate suspects only as part of its internal oversight. The service reports to the Government, Prime Minister and President of the Czech Republic and its activities are regulated and overseen by the Government, Permanent Commission of the Chamber of Deputies and its own internal audit. The service is headed by the Director who is appointed by the Prime Minister with consent of the Committee on Security of the Chamber of Deputies.

The current director is Michal Koudelka, who has served since 15 August 2016, after being sworn in by Prime Minister Bohuslav Sobotka.

== Duties ==
The Security Information Service performs duties associated with the analysis, democracy and constitutionality, terrorism, counter-intelligence, cybersecurity, organized crime, proliferation and use of strategically important intelligence regarding the fields of politics, economics and intelligence within the territory of the Czech Republic.

== 2014 Vrbětice ammunition warehouse explosions ==
In 2014, two explosions occurred at ammunition depots in Vrbětice, Czech Republic—the first on 16 October and the second on 3 December—resulting in two fatalities and extensive damage. Subsequent investigations by Czech authorities revealed that agents from Russia's GRU Unit 29155 were involved, allegedly aiming to disrupt weapons supplies to Ukraine. The cleanup of unexploded ordnance concluded in October 2020.

== 2025 events ==
In March 2025, revelation by Czech intelligence services of a covert Russian operation involving Belarusian journalist Natalia Sudliankova, identified as a key collaborator for Russia's military intelligence agency, the GRU. Active in the Czech Republic since 1999, Sudliankova allegedly published GRU-directed content, collaborated with pro-Kremlin organizations, and received crypto payments for espionage-related activities. Her expulsion, along with sanctions against her and GRU officer Alexey Shavrov, marked a major escalation in Czech efforts to counter Russian influence, highlighting the persistent threat of foreign intelligence operations in Europe.

== See also ==
- Centre Against Terrorism and Hybrid Threats
- 2025 GRU Exposure in Prague
