= Theatre of the Czech Republic =

Overview of theater in the Czech Republic

The theatre of the Czech Republic has a rich tradition in all genres, including drama, opera, ballet and dance, puppet theatre, black light theatre etc.

== History ==
The Czech theatre played an important role in the history of theatre since the Middle Ages. In the 19th century, the theatre was an integral part of the Czech National Revival. Later, in the 20th century, many notable theatre makers influenced the European theatre art.

Between 1739 and 1783 the Divadlo v Kotcích (English: Kotzen Theatre), a theatre and opera venue on v Kotcích street in Prague, enjoyed its heyday as the second public opera theatre in Prague. The opera theatre of Franz Anton von Sporck was also a notable public theatre in the city at this time.

The Estates Theatre was initially built with the intention of producing German dramas and Italian operas, but works in other languages were also staged. Czech productions were first staged in 1785 in order to reach a broader Czech audience but by 1812 they became a regular feature of Sunday and holiday matinees. The somewhat political nature of these performances later led to idea of founding a National Theatre after 1848 with the defeat of the revolution and the departure of J.K. Tyl. Many of the founding Czech dramatists were involved in the Estates Theatre, such as the brothers Thám (Karel and Václav), J.K. Tyl, Ján Kollár, and so on.

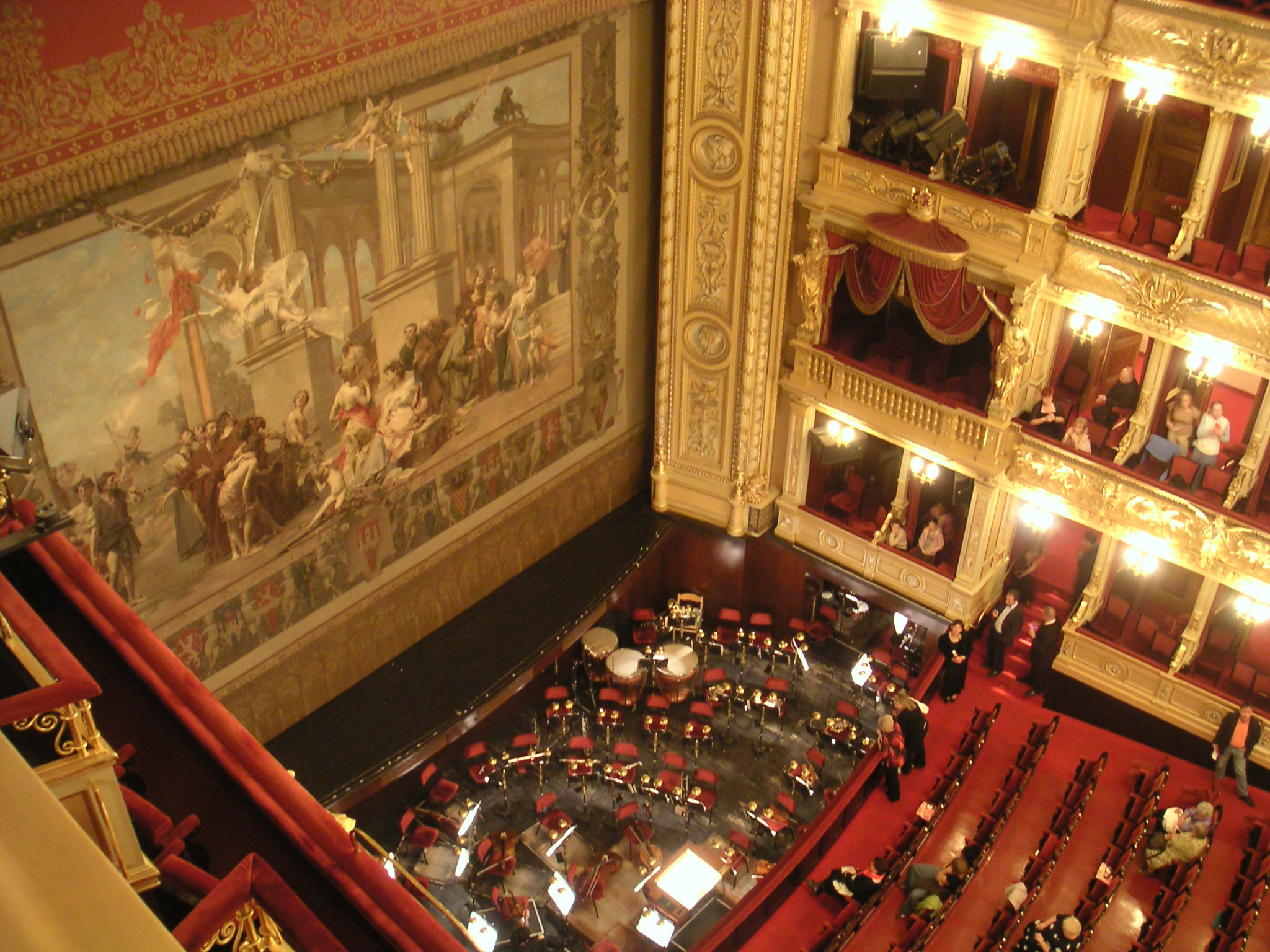
Interior of the National Theatre, 2007

Before the early 1860s almost all cultural institutions in Prague, including theatre and opera, was in Austrian hands. Bohemia was a province of the Habsburg Empire, and under that regime's absolutist rule most aspects of Czech culture and national life had been discouraged or suppressed. Absolutism was formally abolished by a decree of the Emperor Franz Josef on 20 October 1860, which led to a Czech cultural revival. The Bohemian Diet (parliament) had acquired a site in Prague on the banks of the Vltava, and in 1861 announced a public subscription, which raised a sum of 106,000 florins. This covered the costs of building a small 800-seat theatre, which would act as a home for production of Czech drama and opera while longer-term plans for a permanent National Theatre could be implemented. The Provisional Theatre opened on 18 November 1862, with a performance of Vítězslav Hálek's tragic drama King Vukašín.

The drama of the First Czechoslovak Republic followed the same stylistic evolution as poetry and prose — expressionism, followed by a return to realistic, civilian theatre (František Langer, Karel Čapek). Avantgarde theatre also flourished, focusing on removing the barriers between actors and audience, breaking the illusion of the unity of a theatrical work (Osvobozené divadlo, Jiří Voskovec and Jan Werich). In the 1930s, Karel Čapek wrote his most politically charged (and well-known) plays in response to the rise of fascist dictators.

Václav Havel found employment in Prague's theatre world as a stagehand at Prague's Theatre ABC – Divadlo ABC, and then at the Theatre On Balustrade – Divadlo Na zábradlí. Simultaneously, he was a student of dramatic arts by correspondence at the Theatre Faculty of the Academy of Performing Arts in Prague (DAMU). His first own full-length play performed in public, besides various vaudeville collaborations, was The Garden Party (1963). Presented in a series of Theatre of the Absurd, at the Theatre on Balustrade, this play won him international acclaim. The play was soon followed by The Memorandum, one of his best known plays, and The Increased Difficulty of Concentration, all at the Theatre on Balustrade. In 1968, The Memorandum was also brought to The Public Theater in New York, which helped to establish Havel's reputation in the United States. The Public Theater continued to produce his plays in the following years. After 1968, Havel's plays were banned from the theatre world in his own country, and he was unable to leave Czechoslovakia to see any foreign performances of his works.

== List of notable Czech theatre directors ==
- Jan Kačer
- Otomar Krejča
- Petr Lébl
- Jan Nebeský
- Jan Antonín Pitínský
- Alfréd Radok
- Peter Scherhaufer
- Eva Tálská

== List of notable Czech scenic designers ==
- Jaroslav Malina
- Josef Svoboda

== List of notable Czech theatre actors ==
- Jan Tříska
- David Prachař
- Karel Roden
- Miroslav Táborský
- Jiří Ornest
- Tomáš Töpfer
- Daniela Kolářová
- Marie Málková
- Iva Janžurová

== List of important Czech theatres and theatre companies ==
- Národní divadlo
- Prague State Opera
- National Marionette Theatre (Národní divadlo marionet)
- Spejbl and Hurvínek Theater – country's first professional puppet theater

== List of important Czech theatre festivals ==
- Theatre of European regions
- Theatre Plzeň
- Mateřinka
- Summer Shakespeare Holiday
- International Festival Zero Point

== Czech theatre awards ==
- Alfréd Radok Awards
- Thalia Awards

== Czech theatre schools ==
- Academy of Performing Arts in Prague
- Janáček Academy of Music and Performing Arts

== See also ==
- Czech literature
