= Cape Editions =

The Cape Editions are a selection of short books, frequently in translation, issued by UK publisher Jonathan Cape from 1967 to 1971.

The collection has been described as "the remarkable Cape Editions series of seminal modern texts: poetry, prose, anthropology, drama, many of them pioneering translations".

The general editor of the series was professor and poet Nathaniel Tarn.

== Cape Editions ==
#	Title	Author	Year	Original title or source	Cape year	Translator	SBN / ISBN
1	The Scope of Anthropology	Claude Lévi-Strauss	after 1950	?	1967	Sherry Ortner Paul, Robert A. Paul	S: SBN; H: SBN
2	Call Me Ishmael	Charles Olson	1947				S: SBN; H: SBN
3	Writing Degree Zero	Roland Barthes	1953	Le Degré zéro de l'écriture	1967	Annette Lavers, Colin Smith	S: SBN; H: SBN
4	Elements of Semiology	Roland Barthes	1964	Éléments de sémiologie			S: SBN; H: SBN
5	I Wanted to Write a Poem	William Carlos Williams	1958				S: SBN; H: SBN
6	The Memorandum	Václav Havel	1965	Vyrozumění	1967	Vera Blackwell	S: SBN; H: SBN
7	Selected Poems	Nazim Hikmet	20th c.	?	1967	Taner Baybars	S: SBN; H: SBN
8	Aphorisms & Letters	Georg Christoph Lichtenberg	18th c.	?			S: SBN; H: SBN
9	Tango	Slavomir Mrozek	1964	Tango			S: SBN; H: SBN
10	On Love ... Aspects of a Single Theme	José Ortega y Gasset	20th c.	?			S: SBN; H: SBN
11	Manhood	Michel Leiris	1939	L’Âge d’homme			S: SBN; H: SBN
12	Bees: Their Vision, Chemical Senses, and Language	Karl von Frisch	20th c.	?			S: SBN; H: SBN
13	Lunar Caustic	Malcolm Lowry	1968		1968		S: SBN; H: SBN
14	Twenty Prose Poems	Charles Baudelaire	1869?	possibly selections from Le Spleen de Paris			S: SBN; H: SBN
15	Journeys	Günter Eich	20th c.	?			S: SBN; H: SBN
16	A Close Watch on the Trains	Bohumil Hrabal	1965	Ostře sledované vlaky			S: SBN; H: SBN
17	Mayan Letters	Charles Olson	1953		1968	Robert Creeley (ed.)	S: SBN; H: SBN
18	The Courtship Habits of the Great Crested Grebe	Julian Huxley	1914				S: SBN; H: SBN
19	The Supermale	Alfred Jarry	1902	Le Surmâle			S: SBN; H: SBN
20	Poems & Antipoems	Nicanor Parra	1954	Poemas y antipoemas			S: SBN; H: SBN
21	In Praise of Krishna: Songs from the Bengali	Various	?	?			S: SBN; H: SBN
22	History Will Absolve Me	Fidel Castro	1953	La historia me absolverá			S: SBN; H: SBN
23	Selected Poems	Georg Trakl	after 1912	?	1968	Robert Grenier et al, Christopher Middleton (ed.)	S: SBN; H: SBN
24	Selected Poems	Yves Bonnefoy	after 1945	?			S: SBN; H: SBN
25	Ferdinand	Louis Zukofsky	1968				S: SBN; H: SBN
26	The Recluse	Adalbert Stifter	19th c.	?			S: SBN; H: SBN
27	Dialectical Materialism	Henri Lefebvre	1940	Le Matérialisme dialectique			S: SBN; H: SBN
28	Missing from the available listing						S: SBN; H: SBN
29	Soul on Ice	Eldridge Cleaver	1968				S: SBN; H: SBN
30	The Human Sciences and Philosophy	Lucien Goldmann	1966	Sciences humaines et philosophie			S: SBN; H: SBN
31	Selected Poems	André Breton	20th c.	?	1969		S: SBN; H: SBN
32	Soap	Francis Ponge	1967	Le Savon	1969	Lane Dunlop	S: SBN; H: SBN
33	Histoire extraordinaire: Essay on a dream of Baudelaire's	Michel Butor	1961	Histoire extraordinaire : essai sur un rêve de Baudelaire	1969	Richard Howard	S: SBN; H: ISBN 0-224-61664-1
34	Conversations with Claude Lévi-Strauss	Georges Charbonnier	1961	Entretiens avec Claude Lévi-Strauss			S: SBN; H: SBN
35	An Absence	Uwe Johnson	1964	Eine Reise wegwohin			S: SBN; H: SBN
36	A Critique of Pure Tolerance	Robert Paul Wolff, Barrington Moore Jr., Herbert Marcuse	1965				S: SBN; H: SBN
37	The Garden Party	Václav Havel	1963	Zahradní slavnost			S: SBN; H: SBN
38	Twenty Love Poems and a Song of Despair	Pablo Neruda	1924	Veinte poemas de amor y una canción desesperada	1969	W. S. Merwin	S: SBN; H: ISBN 0-224-61725-7
39	Genesis as Myth and Other Essays	Edmund Leach	1969		1969		S: SBN; H: SBN
40	Cold Mountain	Han-Shan	9th c.	?	1970	Burton Watson	S: SBN; H: SBN
41	The World, the Flesh and the Devil	J. D. Bernal	1929		1970		S: SBN; H: ISBN 0-224-61831-8
42	The Death of Lysanda	Yitzhak Orpaz	1964	מות ליסאנדה	1970	Richard Flint	S: SBN 224 61873 3 H: SBN 224 61874 1

=== Later additions ===
#	Title	Author	Year	Original title or source	Cape year	Translator	SBN / ISBN
46	Poems	Hermann Hesse	1953 (original copyright)/1970 (translated by James Wright)	?	1971	James Wright	S: ISBN; H: ISBN 0-224-00554-5

== Sources ==
A listing of the titles appears in The Death of Lysanda, Yitzhak Orpaz (p. 110).
