= Post-structuralism =

Philosophical school and tradition

Post-structuralism is a philosophical movement that questions the objectivity or stability of the various interpretive structures that are posited by structuralism and considers them to be constituted by broader systems of power. Although different post-structuralists present different critiques of structuralism, common themes include the rejection of the self-sufficiency of structuralism, as well as an interrogation of the binary oppositions that constitute its structures. Accordingly, post-structuralism discards the idea of interpreting media (or the world) within pre-established, socially constructed structures.

Structuralism proposes that human culture can be understood by means of a structure that is modeled on language. As a result, there is concrete reality on the one hand, abstract ideas about reality on the other hand, and a "third order" that mediates between the two.

A post-structuralist response, then, might suggest that in order to build meaning out of such an interpretation, one must (falsely) assume that the definitions of these signs are both valid and fixed, and that the author employing structuralist theory is somehow above and apart from these structures they are describing so as to be able to wholly appreciate them. The rigidity and tendency to categorize intimations of universal truths found in structuralist thinking is a common target of post-structuralist thought, while also building upon structuralist conceptions of reality mediated by the interrelationship between signs.

Writers whose works are often characterised as post-structuralist include Roland Barthes, Jacques Derrida, Michel Foucault, Gilles Deleuze, and Jean Baudrillard, although many theorists who have been called "post-structuralist" have rejected the label.

== History ==
Post-structuralism emerged in France during the 1960s as a movement critiquing structuralism. According to J. G. Merquior, a love–hate relationship with structuralism developed among many leading French thinkers in the 1960s. The period was marked by the rebellion of students and workers against the state in May 1968.

In a 1966 lecture titled "Structure, Sign, and Play in the Discourse of the Human Sciences", Jacques Derrida presented a thesis on an apparent rupture in intellectual life. Derrida interpreted this event as a "decentering" of the former intellectual cosmos. Instead of progress or divergence from an identified centre, Derrida described this "event" as a kind of "play."

A year later, in 1967, Roland Barthes published "The Death of the Author", in which he announced a metaphorical event: the "death" of the author as an authentic source of meaning for a given text. Barthes argued that any literary text has multiple meanings and that the author was not the prime source of the work's semantic content. The "Death of the Author," Barthes maintained, was the "Birth of the Reader," as the source of the proliferation of meanings of the text.

=== Barthes and the need for metalanguage ===
In Elements of Semiology (1967), Barthes advances the concept of the metalanguage, a systematized way of talking about concepts like meaning and grammar beyond the constraints of a traditional (first-order) language; in a metalanguage, symbols replace words and phrases. Insofar as one metalanguage is required for one explanation of the first-order language, another may be required, so metalanguages may actually replace first-order languages. Barthes exposes how this structuralist system is regressive; orders of language rely upon a metalanguage by which it is explained, and therefore deconstruction itself is in danger of becoming a metalanguage, thus exposing all languages and discourse to scrutiny. Barthes' other works contributed deconstructive theories about texts.

=== Derrida's lecture at Johns Hopkins ===
The occasional designation of post-structuralism as a movement can be tied to the fact that mounting criticism of Structuralism became evident at approximately the same time that Structuralism became a topic of interest in universities in the United States. This interest led to a colloquium at Johns Hopkins University in 1966 titled "The Languages of Criticism and the Sciences of Man", to which such French philosophers as Jacques Derrida, Roland Barthes, and Jacques Lacan were invited to speak.

Derrida's lecture at that conference, "Structure, Sign, and Play in the Human Sciences", was one of the earliest to propose some theoretical limitations to Structuralism, and to attempt to theorize on terms that were clearly no longer structuralist.

The element of "play" in the title of Derrida's essay is often erroneously interpreted in a linguistic sense, based on a general tendency towards puns and humour, while social constructionism as developed in the later work of Michel Foucault is said to create play in the sense of strategic agency by laying bare the levers of historical change.

== Relationship with structuralism ==
Structuralism, as an intellectual movement in France in the 1950s and 1960s, studied underlying structures in cultural products (such as texts) and used analytical concepts from linguistics, psychology, anthropology, and other fields to interpret those structures. Structuralism posits the concept of binary opposition, in which frequently-used pairs of opposite-but-related words (concepts) are often arranged in a hierarchy; for example: Enlightenment/Romanticism, male/female, speech/writing, rational/emotional, signified/signifier, symbolic/imaginary, and east/west.

Post-structuralism rejects the structuralist notion that the dominant word in a pair is dependent on its subservient counterpart, and instead argues that founding knowledge on either pure experience (phenomenology) or on systematic structures (structuralism) is impossible, because history and culture actually condition the study of underlying structures, and these are subject to biases and misinterpretations. Gilles Deleuze and others saw this impossibility not as a failure or loss, but rather as a cause for "celebration and liberation." A post-structuralist approach argues that to understand an object (a text, for example), one must study both the object itself and the systems of knowledge that produced the object. The uncertain boundaries between structuralism and post-structuralism become further blurred by the fact that scholars rarely label themselves as post-structuralists. Some scholars associated with structuralism, such as Roland Barthes and Michel Foucault, also became noteworthy in post-structuralism.

== Authors ==
The following are often said to be post-structuralists, or to have had a post-structuralist period:

- Kathy Acker
- Giorgio Agamben
- Jean Baudrillard
- Roland Barthes
- Wendy Brown
- Judith Butler
- Rey Chow
- Hélène Cixous
- Jodi Dean
- Gilles Deleuze
- Jacques Derrida
- Umberto Eco
- John Fiske
- Michel Foucault
- Nancy Fraser
- Félix Guattari
- Luce Irigaray
- Julia Kristeva
- Teresa de Lauretis
- Sarah Kofman
- Jacques Lacan
- Philippe Lacoue-Labarthe
- Ernesto Laclau
- Jean-François Lyotard
- Achille Mbembe
- Todd May
- Chantal Mouffe
- Jean-Luc Nancy
- Avital Ronell
- Bernard Stiegler
- Gayatri Chakravorty Spivak

== Criticism ==
Some observers from outside of the post-structuralist camp have questioned the rigour and legitimacy of the field. American philosopher John Searle suggested in 1990: "The spread of 'poststructuralist' literary theory is perhaps the best-known example of a silly but non-catastrophic phenomenon." Similarly, physicist Alan Sokal in 1997 criticized "the postmodernist/poststructuralist gibberish that is now hegemonic in some sectors of the American academy."

Historian Frances Stonor Saunders suggests in her 1999 book Who Paid the Piper? that post-structuralism was funded and encouraged by American intelligence during the Cold War in order to diminish the influence of Marxism among intellectuals and in academia. Saunders writes that the CIA "committed vast resources to a secret programme of cultural propaganda" with the aim of "nudg[ing] the intelligentsia of western Europe away from its lingering fascination with Marxism and Communism towards a view more accommodating of ‘the American way’." She also points out that a CIA report titled France: Defection of the Leftist Intellectuals praises Foucault for the "critical demolition of Marxist influence in the social sciences."

Literature scholar Norman Holland in 1992 saw post-structuralism as flawed due to reliance on Ferdinand de Saussure's linguistic model, which was seriously challenged by the 1950s and was soon abandoned by linguists:

Saussure's views are not held, so far as I know, by modern linguists, only by literary critics and the occasional philosopher. [Strict adherence to Saussure] has elicited wrong film and literary theory on a grand scale. One can find dozens of books of literary theory bogged down in signifiers and signifieds, but only a handful that refers to Chomsky."

== See also ==
- Development criticism
- Dispositif
- Narrative therapy
- Post-postmodernism
- Post-structural feminism
- Post-structuralist subject
- Poststructuralism (international relations)
- Reader-response criticism
- Semiotics
- Social criticism
- Social theory
