= Edward Einhorn =

American playwright and director

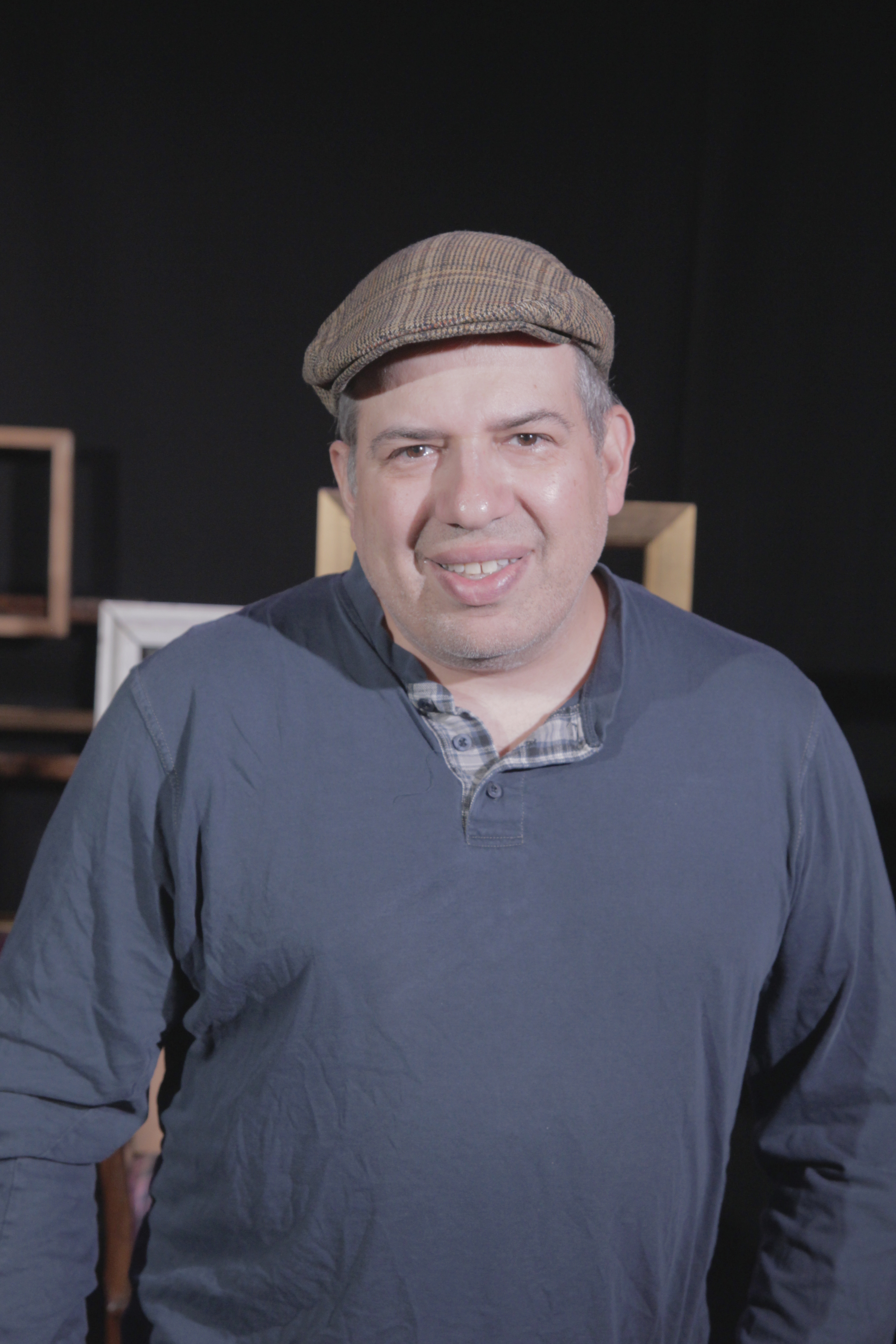
- Born: September 6, 1970 (age 55); Westfield, New Jersey, U.S.
- Education: Westfield High School; Johns Hopkins University; Guildhall School of Music and Drama
- Occupations: Playwright; theater director; novelist
- Website: www.edwardeinhorn.com

Edward Einhorn (born September 6, 1970) is an American playwright, theater director, and novelist.

== Early life, education and career ==
A native of Westfield, New Jersey, Einhorn graduated from Westfield High School, where he was an editor of the student newspaper Hi's Eye. He attended Johns Hopkins University, and he has a MA in Opera Writing from the Guildhall School of Music and Drama. In 1992, he cofounded the Untitled Theater Company No. 61 in New York with his older brother, David. He curated the Ionesco Festival in 2001 (Eugène Ionesco's complete works) and the Havel Festival in 2006 (Václav Havel's complete works). He currently also serves as the artistic director of the Rehearsal for Truth International Theater Festival, honoring Václav Havel.

== As a playwright ==
As a playwright, Einhorn became known for his absurd comic style. One of his best-known plays is The Marriage of Alice B. Toklas by Gertrude Stein, a farce set at a fantasy marriage between Stein and Toklas. The show received a Critic's Pick from Jesse Green, then co-chief reviewer of The New York Times for its production at HERE Arts. It was also produced Off-West End at the Jermyn Street Theatre. at His other works include dramas on Jewish legends and a series of plays on neurological and neuroscientific topics — The Neurology of the Soul (on neuromarketing), The Boy Who Wanted to be a Robot (on Asperger syndrome), The Taste of Blue, (on synesthesia), Strangers (on Korsakoff syndrome), and Linguish (on aphasia). He adapted Lysistrata and Iphigenia in Aulis for modern audiences. In 2023, his play The Shylock and the Shakespeareans, a darkly humorous retelling of The Merchant of Venice, was produced at The New Ohio Theatre and received a rave review from Yair Rosenberg in The Atlantic.

Adaptations include Do Androids Dream of Electric Sheep? by Philip K. Dick; The Left Hand of Darkness and The Lathe of Heaven, both by Ursula Le Guin; The Iron Heel, by Jack London; and City of Glass, by Paul Auster. He also translated and adapted Václav Havel's final play, The Pig, or Václav Havel's Hunt for a Pig, as well as translating Havel's one-act, Ela, Hela, and the Hitch. He also turned the existing fragments of Exagoge by Ezekiel the Tragedian into a play/opera/immersive Passover seder.

== As a novelist ==
Einhorn has written two Oz novels, Paradox in Oz and The Living House of Oz, both illustrated by Eric Shanower. He has written two picture books on mathematical subjects for young readers: A Very Improbable Story, on the subject of probability, and Fractions in Disguise, on the subject of fractions. A number of his plays have also been published, including a graphic novel adaptation of Iphigenia in Aulis, with art by Eric Shanower, from Image Comics.

== Podcasts ==
In 2020, his podcast The Resistible Rise of J. R. Brinkley was released, a four-part audio drama about the quack doctor turned politician, hosted by Dan Butler.

In 2021, his podcast The Iron Heel was released, a three-part audio drama adaptation of the book by Jack London.

== As a theater director ==
While working with Untitled Theater Company No. 61, he directed T. S. Eliot's Sweeney Agonistes, Eugène Ionesco's The Bald Soprano, and Richard Foreman's My Head Was a Sledgehammer, among other works. Off-Broadway, he directed Fairy Tales of the Absurd, a trilogy of one-act plays, two by Ionesco and one (One Head Too Many) by himself.

In 2014 and 2015, he created and directed the show Money Lab, an economic vaudeville, produced at HERE Arts Center in Manhattan and The Brick in Brooklyn.

In 2022, he directed a film of The Last Cyclist written in Terezín (Theresienstadt Ghetto) by Karel Švenk and reconstructed by Naomi Patz, which was originally staged at La MaMa Experimental Theatre Club and was broadcast on WNET Channel 13, a PBS affiliate, as part of Theater Close Up.
