= Lebl =

Lebl may refer to:

== People ==
- Ilektra Lebl (born 1999), Greek swimmer
- Martin Lébl (born 1980), Czech volleyball player
- Paulina Lebl-Albala (1891-1967), Serbian feminist, translator, literary critic, literature theoretician, and professor
- Petr Lébl (1965-1999), Czech theatre director, scenographer, actor, designer, and artistic director

== Other ==
- LEBL, airport code for Josep Tarradellas Barcelona–El Prat Airport in Catalonia, Spain
