= Ela, Hela and The Hitch =

Ela, Hela, and the Hitch is a play by Václav Havel. The play was written for the artistic director of the Theatre on the Balustrade, Ivan Vyskočil, as part of a longer evening, entitled Hitchhiking. Along with Ela, Hela, and the Hitch, Havel also wrote a sketch called Motormorphosis. Reportedly, Vyskočil altered Havel's sketches for the performance, though the original text was discovered by a Czech theater scholar, Lenka Jungmannová. Motormorphosis, in a translation by Carol Rocamora, was performed at the Havel Festival in 2006, a world premiere of the text as written. Ela, Hela, and the Hitch premiered in an English translation by Edward Einhorn following a revival of Motormorphosis at New York's Bohemian National Hall in 2011.
