= The Increased Difficulty of Concentration =

1969 Czech play by Václav Havel

The Increased Difficulty of Concentration is a play by Václav Havel. The English translation is by Štěpán Šimek. It is a metaphysical farce, in which Hummel, an academic, juggles lovers, philosophy, and the questions from a strange machine called Pazuk, while trying to make sense of his life.

It was originally performed in 1969 in Prague at the Theatre on the Balustrade. It won an Obie Award for distinguished play in 1970 for its production at Lincoln Center in New York.
