= Antikódy =

Antikódy (Anticodes) is a book of experimental poems and calligrammes by Václav Havel. Most of the poems are based on visual effect on the reader (e. g. a poem consisting of repetitive word "forward" only, in a shape of a cycle, or a poem made of the word "life" in a shape of cross, meaning death). It consists of four parts, first written in 1964, second 1964 – 1969, third 1970 – 1989, and the last one after 1989 (consisting of two poems: HRAD? Hrádeček? (CASTLE? Little castle?), i. e. a poem reflecting his political moods, and Kavárna Slavie (Café Slavia)).

== See also ==
- Václav Havel
- Calligramme
- ASCII art
