= Theatre on the Balustrade =

Theatre in Prague, Czechia

- Divadlo Na zábradlí

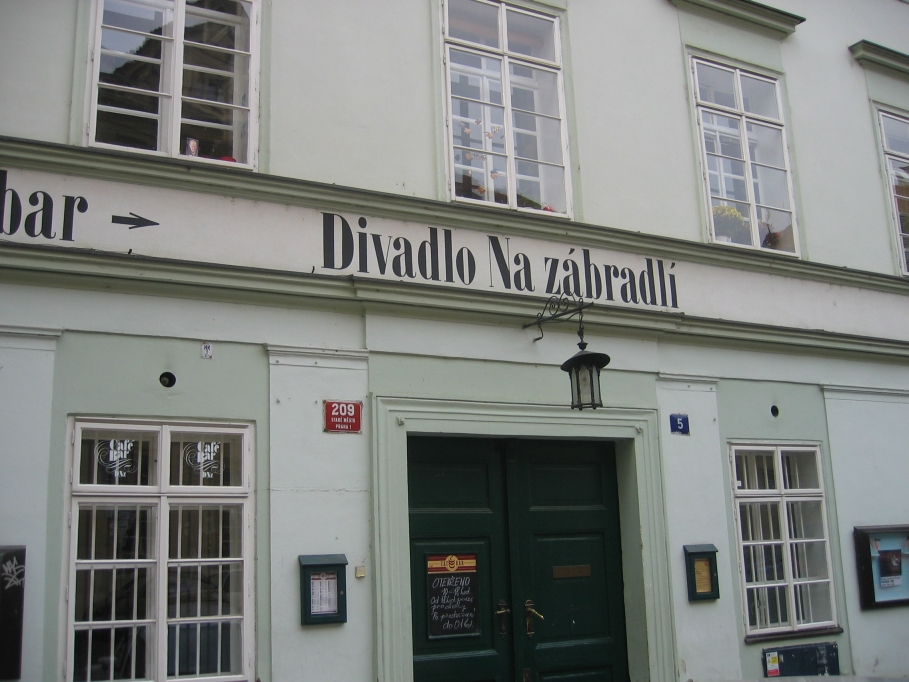
- Theatre on the Balustrade (2006)
- Interactive map of Theatre on the Balustrade
- Address: Anenské náměstí 209/5; Prague 1 Czech Republic
- Coordinates: 50.087069°N 14.415325°E

Construction
- Opened: 1958

Website
- Official website

The Theatre on the Balustrade (Czech: Divadlo Na zábradlí) is situated in Prague, Czech Republic.

== History ==
=== Early history ===
The theatre was founded in 1958. Its founders - Helena Philipová, Ivan Vyskočil, Jiří Suchý and Vladimír Vodička named their professional theatre after a street leading from the square to the river. Its first production, a musical collage titled If a Thousand Clarinets (Czech: Kdyby tisíc klarinetů), was premiered on 9 December 1958. Three months later Ladislav Fialka and his mime group joined the company with their production Pantomime on the Balustrade, and brought back fame to the almost forgotten theatre genre. Drama and mime companies coexisted at the theatre till Fialka's death in 1991.

In the early 1960s, with the arrival of director Jan Grossman, set designer Libor Fára and a stage hand and later dramaturg and playwright Václav Havel, the Theatre on the Balustrade became the centre of the Czech form of the absurd theatre (Havel's The Garden Party, Memorandum, Alfred Jarry's King Ubu, Franz Kafka's Process). Jan Grossman and Václav Havel were forced to leave the theatre in 1968 after the Warsaw Pact invasion of Czechoslovakia. In the 1970s and 1980s the theatre became a refuge for film directors of the 1960s Czech New Wave, whose film work was thwarted by the normalisation process. Apart from productions directed by Jaromil Jireš, Jiří Krejčík, Jiří Menzel and Juraj Herz, it was mainly Evald Schorm who regularly co-operated with the theatre since 1976 (e.g. The King Stag, Hamlet, The Karamazov Brothers, Marathon) and managed to group around himself a number of accomplished young actors (Jiří Bartoška, Karel Heřmánek, Jana Preissová, Pavel Zedníček, Ladislav Mrkvička).

=== After 1989 ===
In 1989 Jan Grossman returned to the theatre as a director and later its managing director, and after his untimely death in 1993 new management of the theatre was named - managing director Doubravka Svobodová and artistic director Petr Lébl. Petr Lébl was one of the most talented young directors with distinctive imagination who provoked with his interpretations of classics (Jean Genet's The Maids, Ladislav Stroupežnický's Our Our Swaggerers, Nikolai Gogol's The Government Inspector, Anton Chekhov's The Seagull, Ivanov, Uncle Vanya). After Lébl's death in 1999 the theatre continued its seeking, novel course of the present Theatre on the Balustrade with its new artistic direction of Ivana Slámová, Jiří Ornest and Jan Antonín Pitínský. From the start of the season 2002/2003 a young director and playwright Jiří Pokorný became, together with Ivana Slámová, the new artistic director of the theatre.

With arrival of new artistic director David Czesany in 2010 the Theater on the Balustrade started off with a program of theme-based seasons. The first was named “Who will be let through heaven’s gates?”, the current one (2011/2012) will be focused on public space and the city as a place for living and will be called “Whose city?”. Programming decisions as well as other projects of the theatre will be based on this topic: the upcoming season will bring exhibitions and meetings with witnesses to the changes that parts of the city have gone through. The topic of the city will also be tackled by students of art schools as a part of the Eliade Library project that introduces new creative projects, final works of art school graduates and works for children.

With the new director the ensemble has grown as well, with the introduction of new members Ivan Lupták, Natálie Řehořová and Ondřej Veselý.
