= The Pig, or Václav Havel's Hunt for a Pig =

The Pig, or Václav Havel's Hunt for a Pig is the final work by Václav Havel, co-authored by Vladimír Morávek. The English translation is by Edward Einhorn . Originally a short dialogue from 1987 (entitled simply The Pig) and printed in a samizdat, the piece is a comic (and true) story of Václav Havel's efforts to hold a pig roast for his friends.

In 2010, Morávek rediscovered the dialogue and decided to stage it. He began by giving lines to characters only mentioned in passing, but then made a more radical choice: he added sections from one of the most beloved Czech works, The Bartered Bride. This new version was the centerpiece of a theater festival in Brno that June.

The English translation was performed at the 3LD Art & Technology Center in New York as part of the Ohio Theater's Ice Factory It was later published by Theater 61 Press. It was remounted in 2014 at 3LD Art + Technology Center.

The cast and production team of this play consisted of the following:

PRODUCTION TEAM

- Director - Henry Akona
- Choreographer - Patrice Miller
- Stage Manager - Elizabeth Irwin
- Assistant Musical Director - Melissa Elledge
- Assistant Director - Joe Pilowski
- Dramaturg - Karen Lee Ott
- Set Designer - Jane Stein
- Lighting Designer - Jeff Nash
- Costume Designer - Carla Gant
- Projection Designers - Kate Freer & David Tennet
- Sound Operator - Will Campbell
- Band Coordinator - Yvonne Roen

CAST

- American Journalist - Katherine Boynton
- Accordion - Melissa Elledge
- Ensemble - Elizabeth Figols-Galagarza
- Kešot/Ensemble - John Gallop III
- Camera Op - Andrew Goldsmith
- Havel - Robert Honeywell
- Fanda/Choral Leader/Trombone - Michael Hopewell
- Violin - Amanda Lo
- Cello - Michael Midlarsky
- Tap Master's Wife/Ensemble/Clarinet - Jenny Lee Mitchell
- Grip - Mateo Moreno
- Tomačka/Ensemble/Violin - Phoebe Silva
- Soprano Soloist/Ensemble - Moira Stone
- Tenor Soloist/Ensemble - Terrence Stone
- Tap Master/Ensemble - Michael Whitney
- Olga/Ensemble/Flute - Sandy York
