= Nathaniel Tarn =

American poet (1928–2024)

- Born: Edward Michael Mendelson; June 30, 1928; Paris, France
- Died: June 26, 2024 (aged 95); Hertfordshire, England
- Other names: Edward Michael Mendelson, Michel Tavriger
- Education: Clifton College; King's College, Cambridge; Musée de l'Homme; Ecole des Hautes Etudes; Collège de France; University of Paris; Yale University; University of Chicago
- Occupations: Poet; translator; editor; professor of literature and anthropology
- Employers: London School of Economics; School of Oriental and African Studies; Princeton University; Rutgers University

Nathaniel Tarn (June 30, 1928 – June 26, 2024) was a French-American poet, essayist, anthropologist, and translator. He was born Edward Michael Mendelson in Paris, France, to a French-Romanian mother and a British-Lithuanian father.

Tarn lived in Paris until the age of seven, then in Belgium until the age of 11; when World War II began, the family moved to England. He emigrated to the United States in 1970 and taught at several American universities, primarily Rutgers, where he was a professor from 1972 until 1985. He lived outside Santa Fe, New Mexico, after his retirement from Rutgers.

== Education ==
Tarn was educated at Lycée d'Anvers and Clifton College and graduated with degrees in history and English from King's College, Cambridge. He returned to Paris and, after some journalism and radio work, discovered anthropology at the Musée de l'Homme, the Ecole des Hautes Etudes and the Collège de France. A Smith-Mundt-Fulbright grant took him to the University of Chicago; he did fieldwork for his doctorate in anthropology with the Highlands Maya of Guatemala.

== Career ==
In 1958, a grant from the Rockefeller Foundation administered by the Royal Institute of International Affairs sent him to Burma for 18 months, after which he became an instructor at London School of Economics and then lecturer in Southeast Asian Anthropology at the School of Oriental and African Studies of the University of London. Even after moving primarily to literature, he continued to write and publish anthropological work on the Highland Maya and on the sociology of Buddhist institutions, as E. Michael Mendelson.

Tarn published his first volume of poetry, Old Savage/Young City, with Jonathan Cape in 1964 and a translation of Pablo Neruda's The Heights of Macchu Picchu in 1966 (broadcast by the BBC Third Programme in 1966), and began building a new poetry program at Cape. He left anthropology in 1967. From 1967 to 1969, he joined Cape as General Editor of the international series Cape Editions and as a Founding Director of the Cape-Goliard Press, specializing in contemporary American Poetry with emphasis on Charles Olson, Robert Duncan, Louis Zukofsky and their peers and successors. In 1970, with a principal interest in the American literary scene, Tarn immigrated to the United States as Visiting Professor of Romance Languages, Princeton University, and eventually became a citizen. Later, he moved to Rutgers. Later, he taught English and American Literature, Epic Poetry, Folklore and other subjects at the Universities of Pennsylvania, Colorado, and New Mexico.

As poet, literary and cultural critic (Views from the Weaving Mountain, University of New Mexico Press, 1991, and The Embattled Lyric, Stanford University Press, 2007), translator (he was the first to render Victor Segalen's "Stèles" into English, continued work on Neruda, Latin American and French poets) and editor (with many magazines), Tarn published some thirty books and booklets in his various disciplines. His work has been translated into 10 foreign languages. In 1985, he took early retirement as Professor Emeritus of Poetry, Comparative Literature & Anthropology from Rutgers University and lived near Santa Fe, New Mexico. His interests ranged from bird watching, gardening, classical music, opera and ballet, and much varied collecting, to aviation and world history.

Among many recognitions, Tarn received the Guinness Prize for Poetry for two poems in 1963, the Wenner Gren fellowship in 1978 and 1980, a Commonwealth of Pennsylvania fellowship in 1984, a Rockefeller Foundation fellowship in 1958, and was a finalist in the Phi Beta Kappa poetry awards for Selected Poems 1950–2000. His work was variously supported by the Fulbright Program, the Wenner Gren Foundation, the Social Science Research Council, the American Philosophical Society, and a number of other foundations. Tarn's literary and anthropological papers are held by Stanford University Libraries.

Tarn died on June 26, 2024, less than a week before his 96th birthday, in Hertfordshire, England.

== Selected publications ==
- Old Savage/Young City. London: Cape, 1964; New York: Random House, 1966
- Penguin Modern Poets no. 7. London: Penguin Books, 1966
- Where Babylon Ends. London: Cape Goliard Press; New York: Grossman, 1968.
- The Beautiful Contradictions. London: Cape Goliard Press, 1969; New York: Random House, 1970; New York: New Directions, 2013.
- October: A Sequence of Ten Poems Followed by Requiem Pro Duabus Filiis Israel. London: Trigram Press, 1969.
- A Nowhere for Vallejo: Choices, October. New York: Random House, 1971; London: Cape, 1972.
- Le Belle Contraddizioni (tr. Roberto Sanesi). Milan & Samedan, Switz.: Munt Press, 1973
- The Persephones. Santa Barbara, California: Tree, 1974; Sherman Oaks, California: Ninja Press, 2009.
- Lyrics for the Bride of God. New York: New Directions, and London: Cape, 1975.
- The House of Leaves. Santa Barbara, California: Black Sparrow Press, 1976.
- From Alashka: The Ground of Our Great Admiration of Nature. With Janet Rodney. London: Permanent Press, 1977.
- The Microcosm. Milwaukee: Membrane Press. 1977.
- Birdscapes, with Seaside. Santa Barbara, California: Black Sparrow Press, 1978.
- The Forest. With Janet Rodney. Mount Horeb, Wisconsin: Perishable Press, 1978.
- Atitlan / Alashka: New and Selected Poems, the *Alashka* with Janet Rodney. Boulder, Colorado: Brillig Works Press, 1979.
- Weekends in Mexico. London: Oxus Press, 1982.
- The Desert Mothers. Grenada, Mississippi: Salt Works Press, 1984.
- At the Western Gates. Santa Fe: Tooth of Time Press, 1985.
- Palenque: Selected Poems 1972–1984. London: Oasis/Shearsman Press, 1986.
- Seeing America First. Minneapolis: Coffee House Press, 1989.
- The Mothers of Matagalpa. London: Oasis Press, 1989.
- Drafts For: The Army Has Announced That From Now On Body Bags Will Be Known As "Human Remains Pouches" . Parkdale, Oregon: Trout Creek Press, 1992.
- Flying the Body. Los Angeles: Arundel Press, 1993
- A Multitude of One: The Poems of Natasha Tarn (N.T. Editor). New York: Grenfell Press, 1994.
- I Think This May Be Eden, a CD with music by Billy Panda. Nashville: Small Press Distributors, 1997.
- The Architextures: 1988–1994. Tucson: Chax Press, 2000.
- Three Letters from the City: the St. Petersburg Poems. Santa Fe: The Weaselsleeves Press and St. Petersburg: Borey Art Center, 2001.
- Selected Poems: 1950-2000. Middletown: Wesleyan University Press, 2002.
- Recollections of Being. Cambridge and Sydney: Salt Publishing, 2004.
- Avia: A Poem of International Air Combat, 1939–1945. Exeter: Shearsman Books, 2008.
- Ins and Outs of the Forest Rivers. New York: New Directions, 2008.
- Gondwana and Other Poems. New York: New Directions, 2017.

== Translations ==
- Stelae, by Victor Segalen, Santa Barbara: Unicorn Press, 1969.
- The Heights of Macchu Picchu, by Pablo Neruda. London: Cape, 1966 (broadcast by the BBC Third Programme 1966).
- Con Cuba. London: Cape Goliard Press, 1969.
- Selected Poems: A Bilingual Edition, by Pablo Neruda. London: Cape, 1970.
- Pablo Neruda: Selected Poems. London: Penguin Books, 1975 .

== Criticism and anthropology ==
- Los Escandalos de Maximón. Guatemala: Tipographia Nacional, 1965 (as E. M. M.).
- Sangha and State in Burma: A Study of Monastic Sectarianism and Leadership. Ithaca, New York: Cornell University Press, 1975 (as E. M. M.).
- Views from the Weaving Mountain: Selected Essays in Poetics & Anthropology. Albuquerque: University of New Mexico Press, 1991.
- Scandals in the House of Birds: Priests & Shamans in Santiago Atitlán, Guatemala. New York: Marsilio Publishers, 1997.
- The Embattled Lyric; Essays & Conversations in Poetics & Anthropology, with a biographical & bibliographical essay by, and a conversation with, Shamoon Zamir. Stanford: Stanford University Press, 2007.

== Critical studies ==
- Roberto Sanesi in Le Belle Contradizzioni, Milan: Munt Press, 1973
- "Nathaniel Tarn Symposium" in Boundary 2 (Binghamton, NY.), Fall 1975
- "The House of Leaves" by A. Dean Friedland, in Credences 4 (Kent, Ohio), 1977
- Ted Enslin and Rochelle Ratner, in American Book Review 2 (New York), 5, 1980
- Translating Neruda by John Felstiner, Stanford: Stanford University Press, 1980
- "America as Desired: Nathaniel Tarn's Poetry of the Outsider as Insider" by Daria Nekrasova, in American Poetry I (Albuquerque), 4, 1984
- "II Mito come Metalinguaggio nella Poesia de Nathaniel Tarn" by Fedora Giordano, in Letteratura d'America (Rome), 5(22), 1984.
- George Economou, in Sulfur (Ypsilanti, MI.), 14, 1985.
- Gene Frumkin, in Artspace (Albuquerque), 10(l), 1985.
- Lee Bartlett, Nathaniel Tarn: A Descriptive Bibliography, Jefferson, NC & London, 1987
- Lee Bartlett, in Talking Poetry, Albuquerque: University of New Mexico Press, 1987
- "The Sun Is But a Morning Star" by Lee Bartlett, in Studies in West Coast Poetry and Poetics (Albuquerque: University of New Mexico Press, 1989).
- "An Aviary of Tarns" by Eliot Weinberger, in Written Reaction, New York: Marsilio Publishing, 1996
- Shamoon Zamir: "Bringing the World to Little England: Cape Editions, Cape Goliard and Poetry in the Sixties. An Interview with Nathaniel Tarn. With an afterword by Tom Raworth", in E. S. Shaffer, ed., Comparative Criticism, 19: "Literary Devolution." Cambridge: Cambridge University Press, pp. 263–286, 1997.
- Shamoon Zamir: "On Anthropology & Poetry: an Interview with Nathaniel Tarn", Boxkite, no. 1, Sydney, Australia, 1998.
- Shamoon Zamir: "Scandals in the House of Anthropology: notes towards a reading of Nathaniel Tarn" in Cross Cultural Poetics, no.5, (Minneapolis), 1999, pp. 99–122.
- Brenda Hillman: Review of "Selected Poems" in Jacket, 28 (internet), Sydney, Australia, 1999.
- Joseph Donahue: Review of "The Architextures" First Intensity, 16, 2001 (Lawrence, Kansas).
- Peter O'Leary: Review of "Selected Poems: 1950–2000" in XCP Cross Cultural Poetics,. 12, 2003 (Minneapolis).
- Martin Anderson: Review of "Recollections of Being" in Jacket, 36 (internet), Sydney, Australia, 2008.
- Daniel Bouchard: Conversation with NT, in Zoland Poetry, 3, 2009, Hanover, New Hampshire: Steerforth Press, 2009.
- Isobel Armstrong: Review of "Avia" in Tears in the Fence, 50, Blandford Forum, Dorset, UK, 2009.
- Joseph Donahue: review of "Ins & Outs of the Forest Rivers" in "A Nathaniel Tarn Tribute": Jacket, 39 (internet), Sydney, Australia, 2010.
- Richard Deming: Essay on "The Embattled Lyric" & "Selected Poems" in "A Nathaniel Tarn Tribute": Jacket, 39 (internet), Sydney, Australia, 2010.
- Lisa Raphals: Reading NT's "House of Leaves" in "A Nathaniel Tarn Tribute": Jacket, 39 (internet), Sydney, Australia, 2010.
- Toby Olson, Peter Quartermain, John Olson, Richard Deming, David Need, Norman Finkelstein, Peter O'Leary: "For N.T.'s 80th Birthday": Golden Handcuffs Review", 11, 2009 (Seattle).

== La Légende de Saint-Germain-des-Prés ==
Photo book by Serge Jacques with sparse texts by Michel Tavriger printed in both French and English, Paris, 1950
