= William Ratliff =

Research fellow and curator at Stanford's Hoover Institution

William Ratliff (1937 – April 11, 2014) was a research fellow and curator of Americas Collection at Stanford University's Hoover Institution, specializing in Latin America, China and U.S. foreign policy. He was also a research fellow of the Independent Institute and wrote on the economic and political development in East/Southeast Asia and Latin America. For over 20 years, he was the editor for the Yearbook on International Communist Affairs and the Journal of Interamerican Studies. He testified before the U.S. Congress on his work monitoring elections around Latin America.

== Background ==
Ratliff graduated from Oberlin College and received his M.A. and Ph.D. (in Chinese/Latin American histories) from the University of Washington. He taught at Stanford University, San Francisco State University, University of San Francisco, Tunghai University in Taiwan and Diplomatic Academy at Lake Tahoe.

Ratliff wrote in a number of newspapers including the Los Angeles Times, Foreign Affairs, the Wall Street Journal, The New York Times, Chicago Tribune, Washington Post, El Mercurio (in Santiago, Chile), The Globe and Mail and the American Chronicle. Ratliff also appeared on the PBS's NewsHour with Jim Lehrer, on CNN, NPR, the BBC, Voice of America and Radio Marti.
