= Petr Lébl =

Czech theatre director, scenographer, actor, designer and artistic director

Petr Lébl

Petr Lébl (16 May 1965 – 12 December 1999) was a Czech theatre director, scenographer, actor, designer and artistic director of the Theatre on the Balustrade. Lébl is considered one of the most significant personalities of the 20th century Czech theatre.

== Beginnings ==
Lébl was born on 16 May 1965 in Prague. He devoted himself to theatre from an early age. At the age of 15 he became a member of the amateur theatre group DOPRAPO (the group was later renamed to Jak se vám jelo and JELO), with which he performed in his first play, Kolotoč splněných přání. He studied at high-school specializing in graphic arts, and later used his experience in this area on theatre stages.

In 1982, as a high-school student, Lébl attempted to create scenic variations on the theme of the novel Slapstick by Kurt Vonnegut. The same year, he contacted Vonnegut by letter and received a reply. In 1985 Lébl adapted Slapstick as a theatre play. He directed the play and also performed in the lead role. Coincidentally, Vonnegut visited Prague at that time and attended the performance of Slapstick. According to the Czech translator of Slapstick, Jaroslav Kořán, Vonnegut was deeply impressed by the adaptation and wrote a dedication "to my sister Petr" to the Czech translation of the book. When Lébl asked him why he wrote "to my sister", Vonnegut answered that he already has one brother.

Lébl's amateur theatre was reasonably popular in the second half of the 1980s. He met the US ambassador Luers and attended parties organized by the US embassy, where he met John Updike, Edward Albee and William Styron. In his free time, he worked as a designer of shop windows for the company Textil-oděvy Prague.

As an amateur, Lébl attempted to study at the FAMU (film and TV school of the Academy of Performing Arts in Prague), but he wasn't admitted due to "lack of talent". In 1986 he began to study directing and scenography at the Faculty of Theatre, however, he didn't finish his studies.

== Professional career ==
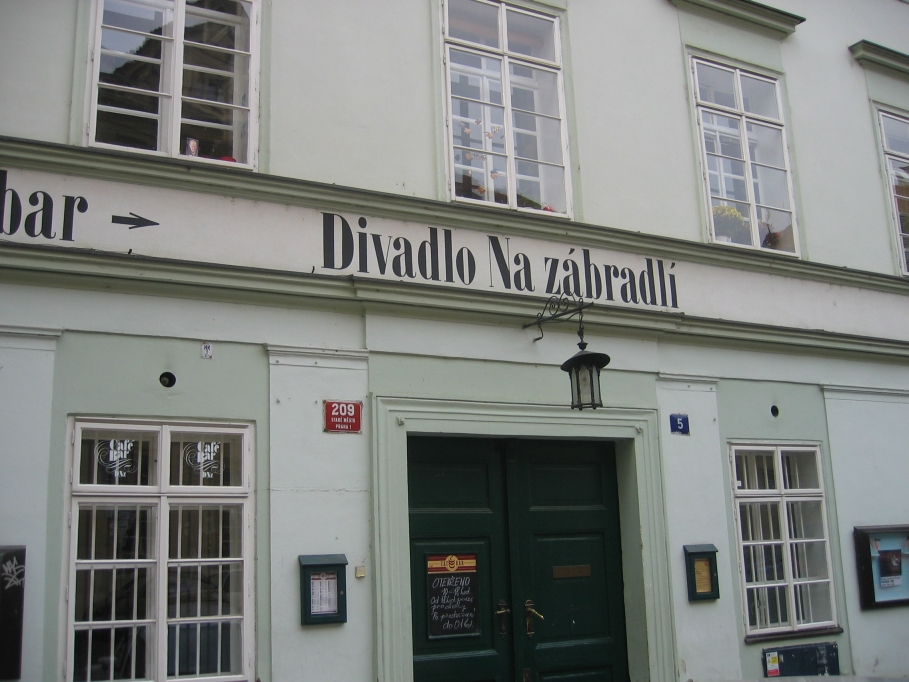
Theatre on the Balustrade

From 1992 up to his death in 1999, Lébl worked as a theatre professional. His first professional theatre experience was a direction in the Theatre Labyrint (1992). A year later, in 1993, he became the artistic director of the Theatre on the Balustrade. He was 28. Lébl's first theatre direction in the Theatre on the Balustrade, The Maids by Jean Genet, won the second place for the best theatre production in the poll of Czech theatre critics. In 1994 he became a pedagogue at the Faculty of Theatre, although he never finished his studies there. In 1995 Lébl received the Czech theatre prize, Alfréd Radok Award, for the production of The Seagull by Anton Chekhov. He gradually became one of the leading personalities of Czech theatre and significantly influenced the face of the Theatre on the Balustrade. During his engagement in the theatre he directed twelve plays, designed stage decorations and programs, organized rehearsals, sometimes he even pasted playbills. His creative and original approach to theatre, absorbing influences from culture, literature, society or politics, repeatedly attracted the attention of theatre critics and public. Two years before his death, in 1997, he received his second Alfréd Radok Award, this time for the production of Chekhov's play Ivanov. The same year, the Israeli Habima Theatre invited him to a guest production of Cyrano de Bergerac.

Petr Lébl was known as a sensitive and complicated personality. According to testimonies provided by his colleagues, he suffered from depression and often spoke openly about his suicidal tendencies. He attempted to fight with his depressive disorder, and shortly before his death he visited a psychiatrist. On 11 December 1999, he hanged himself from the flies of his home stage in the Theatre on the Balustrade. He left a short message on the door of his office: "I'm on the stage". The theatre technicians discovered his body only after the performance of Werner Schwab's play The Presidents (Die Präsidentinnen) a day later. He was 34.

In a message found after his death, Lébl assigned Czech publicist Radka Denemarková to write a book about him. She worked on it for eight years in Lébl's abandoned flat. In 2008, the book was published under the title Smrt, nebudeš se báti aneb Příběh Petra Lébla (Death, thou shall not be afraid alias the Story of Petr Lébl), and a year later it received the Magnesia Litera Award for Journalism.

In 2009, Lébl was voted the most significant Czech theatre personality of the 1989-2009 period in the poll of the Czech magazine Reflex.

== Works ==
=== Theatre direction ===
Lébl as a director of the theatre group JELO

- Horečka (Slapstick) (1985) – Kurt Vonnegut
- Tauridus (1986)
- Polepšovna (The Reform School) (1986) – Christian Morgenstern
- Had (The Snake) (1987) – Mircea Eliade
- Mata Hari (1988)
- Proměna (The Metamorphosis) (1988) – Franz Kafka
- Zpěvačka Josefína (Josephine the Singer, or the Mouse Folk) (1989) – Franz Kafka
- Wesele (1989) – Stanisław Wyspiański
- Výběrčí (1990)– Milan Uhde

Lébl as a guest of the Theatre Labyrint

- Vojcev (1992) – Egon Tobiáš;
- Fernando Krapp mi napsal dopis (Ferdinand Krapp wrote me a letter) (1992) – Tankred Dorst

Lébl as a guest of the Theatre on the Balustrade

- Pokojíček (1993) – Jan Antonín Pitínský

Lébl as a director of the Theatre on the Balustrade

- Služky (The Maids) (1993) – Jean Genet
- Naši naši furianti (Our Our Swaggerers) (1994) – Ladislav Stroupežnický
- Racek (The Seagull) – Anton Chekhov (Alfréd Radok Award)
- Revizor (The Government Inspector) (1995) – Nikolai Gogol
- Hrdina západu (The Playboy of the Western World) (1995) – John Millington Synge
- Cabaret - musical (1995)
- Ivanov – Anton Chekhov (Alfréd Radok Award)
- Matka (Mother) (1997) – Jan Antonín Pitínský
- Wesele (1998);
- Kočičí hra (Catsplay) (1998) – István Örkény
- Plukovník Pták (1998) – Christo Bojčev
- Strýček Váňa (Uncle Vanya) (1999) – Anton Chekhov

Lébl as a guest

- Cyrano de Bergerac - Edmond Rostand – Habima Theatre (Israeli National Theatre) (Tel Aviv, Israel) – 1997
- Braniboři v Čechách (The Brandenburgers in Bohemia) – Bedřich Smetana – National Theatre (Prague) – 1998

=== Television ===
- Studio Kroměříž (1992–93)
