= Elements of Semiology =

1964 compendium-like text by Roland Barthes

First edition

Elements of Semiology (French: Éléments de sémiologie) is a compendium-like text by French semiotician Roland Barthes, originally published under the title of "Éléments de Sémiologie" in the French review Communications (No. 4, 1964, pp. 91–135). The English translation by Annette Lavers and Colin Smith has been published independently as a short book.

In the slightly expanded introduction to the book, Barthes suggests that although linguist Ferdinand de Saussure conceived of linguistics as a branch of semiology, semiology should rather be seen as a branch of linguistics.

== See also ==
- Cape Editions
