= The Garden Party (play) =

1963 play by Václav Havel

The Garden Party (Czech: Zahradní slavnost) is a 1963 play by Václav Havel.

== Plot ==
The protagonist is Hugo Pludek, an average person from a middle-class Czech family. His parents are worried about his future, so they arrange an appointment for him with the influential Mr. Kalabis. Kalabis cannot show up because he is going to a garden party held by the Liquidation Office, so Hugo's parents send him there. Hugo does not find Kalabis, instead starting a sequence of absurd encounters. All of the functionaries of the Liquidation Office speak in a degenerate, ideological, content-free language, as is expected for their role in the bureaucratic system.

Hugo is intelligent and adaptive, and is therefore able to adjust his behaviour. He learns to speak platitudinally, using clichés that do not mean anything real, and finally becomes the head of the newly created Central Inauguration and Liquidation Committee. As a result, he completely loses his identity. At the end of the play, Hugo comes home so changed that his own parents do not recognise him.

== Analysis ==
Parallels may be drawn between Hugo's new behaviour and the behaviour of many among the Czechoslovak population during the Communist era, who chose to conform to the attitudes of the regime that promoted material gain over culture, individuality, and creativity.

One may also argue that the protagonist of this play, in pursuit of his career, has become a cliché himself.

== See also ==
- Cape Editions
