= The Memorandum =

1965 play by Václav Havel

- Written by: Václav Havel
- Characters: Josef Gross (Andrew Gross); Jan Ballas (Max Balas); Pillar (Victor Kubs); Maria (Alice); Hana (Shelley); Helena (Talaura); Stroll (Ken Masat); Savant (Syd Kunc); George (Josh); Thumb (Uma Kalous); Lear (J. V. Brown); Column (Suba)
- Genre: black comedy

Premiere
- Date: 1965

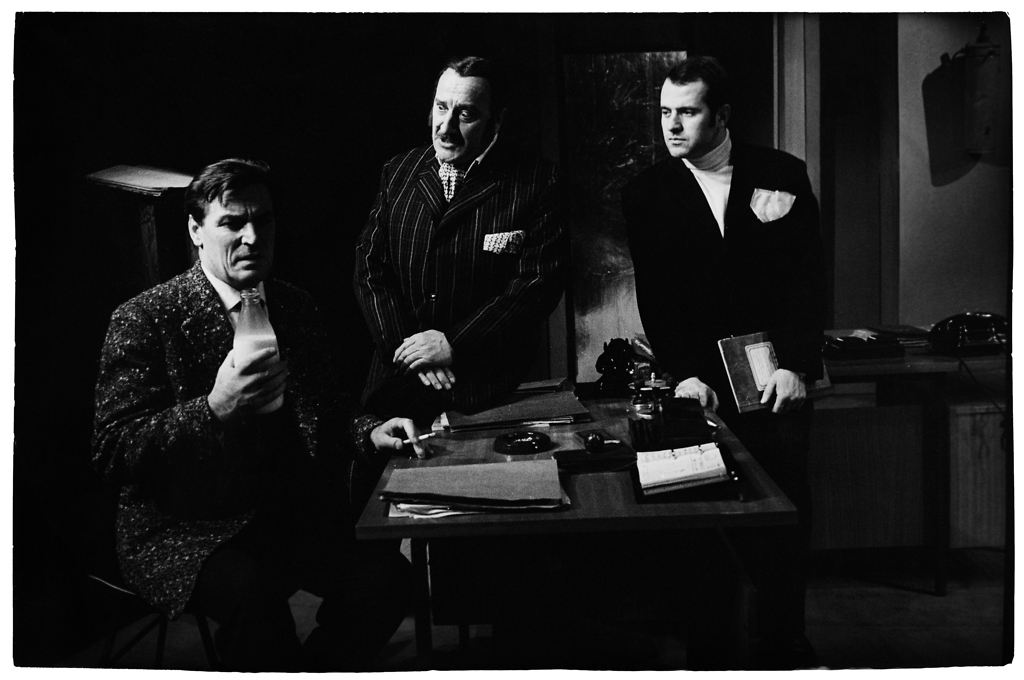
The play by the Ljubljana Drama Theatre in 1969

The Memorandum is the common name in English for the 1965 play Vyrozumění, by Czech playwright Václav Havel. The first English translation, by Vera Blackwell in 1967, used this title. In 2006, Canadian translator Paul Wilson published a new translation, titled The Memo at Havel's request.

The play is a black comedy that parodies bureaucracy and conformity. Havel wrote it prior to the Prague Spring of 1968 as an ironic satire dissenting against communist rule. Despite its veiled themes, the play was approved by government censors and published. The Memorandum centers on the introduction of a new language, "Ptydepe", that is meant to make work more efficient despite having the opposite effect. Sam Walters considers The Memorandum to be Havel’s masterpiece.

== Plot ==
Josef Gross (Andrew Gross in the Wilson translation), a director of an unnamed organization, receives a memorandum written in Ptydepe, a constructed language, about an audit. He finds out that Ptydepe was created to eliminate emotional connotations and similarities between unrelated words (such as "fox" and "ox"). Gross tries to get someone to translate the memorandum for him, and gradually becomes opposed to the use of Ptydepe. He finally finds a reluctant secretary named Maria (Alice in the Wilson translation) who explains that, while she can translate the memorandum, she does not yet have a permit to do so.

The next day, Gross's deputy Jan Ballas (Max Balas in the Wilson translation) takes over his job. Gross becomes a "staff watcher", someone who spies on the workers of the unnamed organization. Meanwhile, Maria gets fired for translating Gross's memorandum. The last few Ptydepe learners in the organization give up on the language. After a while, Ballas gives his job back to Gross. Ptydepe is replaced with another language, Chorukor, one with very extreme similarities between words so as to make learning it easier, but finally it is decided to get back to the mother language. The play ends with most of the characters going to lunch.

== Characters ==
- Josef Gross (Andrew Gross)
- Jan Ballas (Max Balas)
- Pillar (Victor Kubs)
- Maria (Alice)
- Hana (Shelley)
- Helena (Talaura)
- Stroll (Ken Masat)
- Savant (Syd Kunc)
- George (Josh)
- Thumb (Ms. Kalous)
- Lear (J.V. Brown)
- Column (Suba)

== Invented languages ==
The play's two fictional artificial languages, Ptydepe and Chorukor, are at the heart of the play's satire.

=== Ptydepe ===
According to the characters of the play, Ptydepe was constructed along strictly scientific lines, with none of the messiness and ambiguity of natural languages. In order to be able to express precisely all the subtle and easily misunderstood nuances of natural language, Ptydepe has a large, non-expandable vocabulary. Another problem of natural language that Ptydepe was intended to eliminate is the frequent similarity of unrelated words, or homonyms. To entirely avoid the possibilities for confusion that arise with homonyms and similar unrelated words, Ptydepe was created according to the postulate that all words must be formed from the least probable combinations of letters. Specifically, it makes use of the so-called "sixty percent dissimilarity" rule; which states that any Ptydepe word must differ by at least sixty percent of its letters from any other word consisting of the same number of letters. This led to the necessity of creating some very long words. The inevitable problem of pronounceability is solved by breaking very long words up into smaller clusters of letters called "subwords", which nonetheless have no meaning outside of the word they belong to and are not interchangeable.

Length of words, like everything else in Ptydepe, is determined scientifically. The vocabulary of Ptydepe uses entropy encoding: shorter words have more common meanings. Therefore, the shortest word in Ptydepe, gh, corresponds to what is so far known to be the most general term in natural language, whatever. (The longest word in Ptydepe, which contains 319 letters, is the word for "wombat" in an English translation. However in the Czech original it is a name for a nonexistent member of the genus Apus, rorýs říční.) Theoretically an even shorter word than gh exists in Ptydepe, namely f, but it has no meaning assigned and is held in reserve in case a more general term than "whatever" is discovered.

Havel's younger brother, computer scientist Ivan M. Havel, helped in its formulation.

In Czech, the word Ptydepe has been used to mean incomprehensible bureaucratic jargon, or newspeak intending to hide its true meaning.

==== Example ====
From the memorandum discovered in the office in Scene 1:

Ra ko hutu d dekotu ely trebomu emusohe, vdegar yd, stro reny er gryk kendy, alyv zvyde dezu, kvyndal fer teknu sely. Degto yl tre entvester kyleg gh: orka epyl y bodur depty-depe emete. Grojto af xedob yd, kyzem ner osonfterte ylem kho dent de det detrym gynfer bro enomuz fechtal agni laj kys defyj rokuroch bazuk suhelen...

=== Chorukor ===
Chorukor serves as the tentative replacement for Ptydepe at the end of The Memorandum.

==== Example ====
From Scene 11:
PERINA: Of course. In Chorukor, Monday is ilopagar, Tuesday ilopager, Wednesday ilopagur, Thursday ilopagir, Friday ilopageur, Saturday ilopagoor. How do you think Sunday is in Chorukor? Hmm?
(Only Kalous moves)So Kalous!
KALOUS: (standing up) Ilopagor. (he sits down)
PERINA: Correct, Kalous! Good point! Isn't it easy?
