= Václav Havel =

Last president of Czechoslovakia and first president of the Czech Republic (1936–2011)

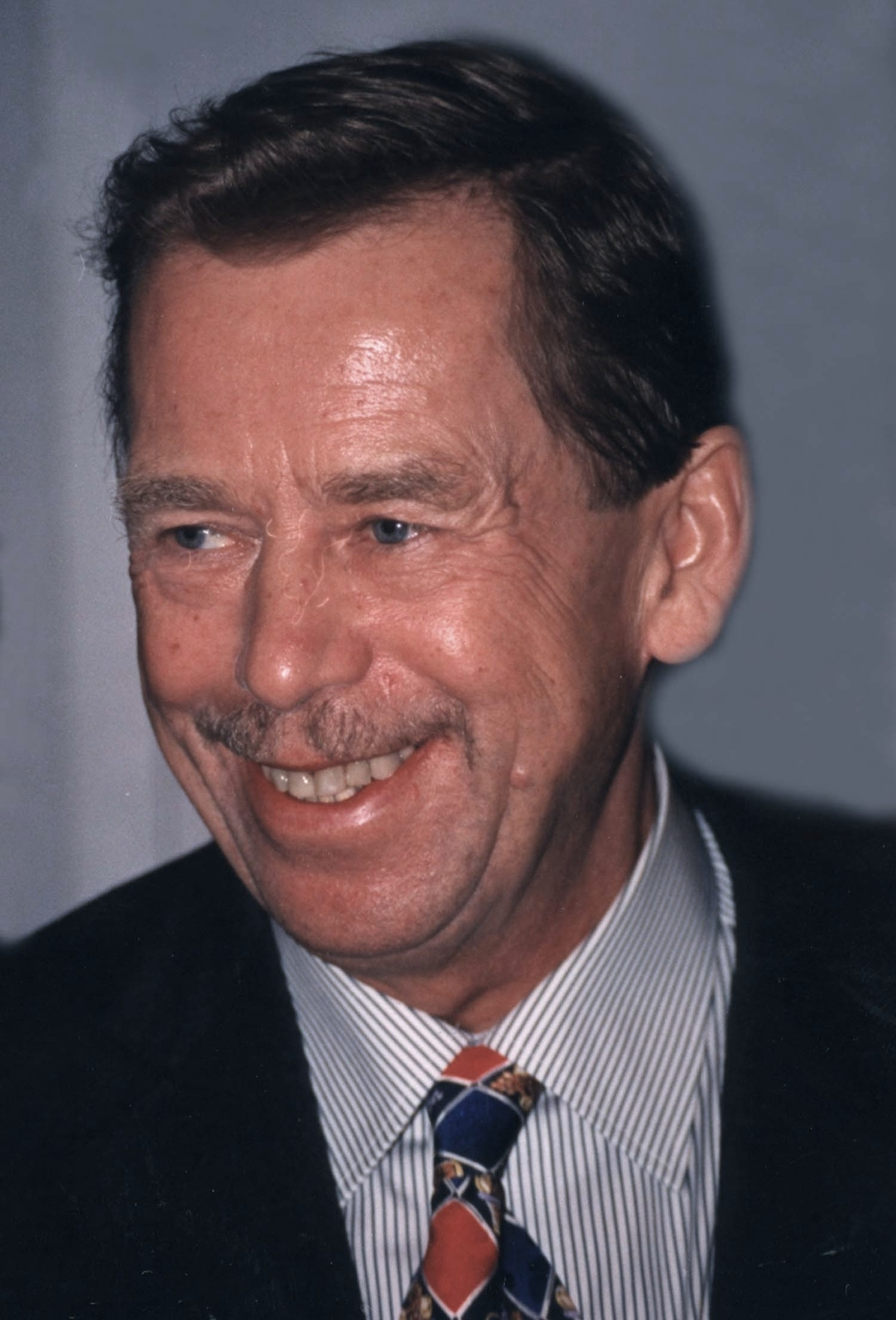
- Havel in 1997

1st President of the Czech Republic
- In office 2 February 1993 – 2 February 2003
- Prime Minister: Václav Klaus; Josef Tošovský; Miloš Zeman; Vladimír Špidla
- Preceded by: Office established
- Succeeded by: Václav Klaus

President of Czechoslovakia
- In office 29 December 1989 – 20 July 1992
- Prime Minister: Marián Čalfa; Jan Stráský
- Preceded by: Gustáv Husák
- Succeeded by: Office abolished

Personal details
- Born: 5 October 1936 Prague, Czechoslovakia
- Died: 18 December 2011 (aged 75) Vlčice, Czech Republic
- Resting place: Vinohrady Cemetery
- Party: OF (1989–1991)
- Spouses: Olga Šplíchalová (m. 1964; died 1996); Dagmar Veškrnová (m. 1997)
- Education: Czech Technical University; Academy of Performing Arts

Václav Havel (Czech: [ˈvaːt͡slav ˈɦavɛl]; 5 October 1936 – 18 December 2011) was a Czech statesman, author, poet, playwright, and dissident. Havel served as the last president of Czechoslovakia from 1989 until 1992, prior to the dissolution of Czechoslovakia on 31 December, before he became the first president of the Czech Republic from 1993 to 2003. He was the first democratically elected president of either country after the fall of communism. As a writer of Czech literature, he is known for his plays, essays and memoirs.

His educational opportunities having been limited by his bourgeois background under the Czechoslovak Socialist Republic, Havel first rose to prominence as a playwright. In works such as The Garden Party and The Memorandum, Havel used an absurdist style to criticize the Communist system. After participating in the Prague Spring and being blacklisted after the Warsaw Pact invasion of Czechoslovakia, he became more politically active and helped found several dissident initiatives, including Charter 77 and the Committee for the Defense of the Unjustly Prosecuted. His political activities brought him under the surveillance of the StB secret police, and he spent several periods as a political prisoner, the longest of his imprisoned terms being nearly four years, between 1979 and 1983.

Havel's Civic Forum party played a major role in the Velvet Revolution that toppled the Communist system in Czechoslovakia in 1989. He assumed the presidency shortly thereafter, and was re-elected in a landslide the following year and after Slovak independence in 1993. Havel was instrumental in dismantling the Warsaw Pact and enlargement of NATO membership eastward. Many of his stances and policies were controversial domestically, such as his opposition to Slovak independence, condemnation of the treatment of Sudeten Germans and their mass expulsion from Czechoslovakia after World War II, and granting of general amnesty to all those imprisoned under the Communist era. By the end of his presidency, he enjoyed greater popularity abroad than at home. Havel continued his life as a public intellectual after his presidency, launching several initiatives including the Prague Declaration on European Conscience and Communism, the VIZE 97 Foundation, and the Forum 2000 annual conference.

Havel's political philosophy was one of anti-consumerism, humanitarianism, environmentalism, civil activism, and direct democracy. He supported the Czech Green Party from 2004 until his death. He received numerous accolades during his lifetime, including the Presidential Medal of Freedom, the Gandhi Peace Prize, the Philadelphia Liberty Medal, the Order of Canada, the Four Freedoms Award, the Ambassador of Conscience Award, and the Hanno R. Ellenbogen Citizenship Award. The 2012–2013 academic year at the College of Europe was named in his honour. He is considered by some to be one of the most important intellectuals of the 20th century. The international airport in Prague was renamed Václav Havel Airport Prague in 2012.

== Early life ==
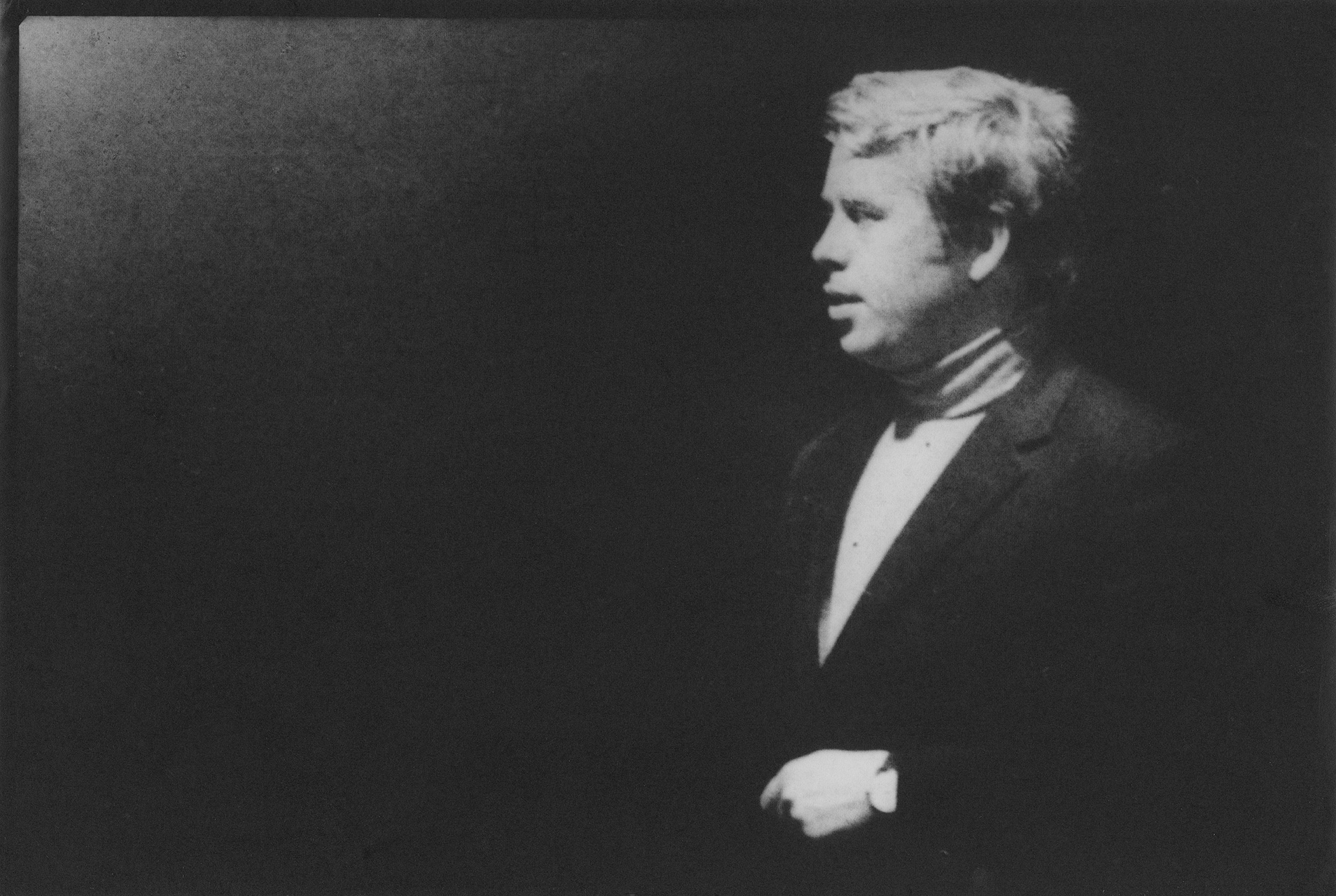
Havel in 1965

Havel was born in Prague on 5 October 1936 into a wealthy family celebrated in Czechoslovakia for its entrepreneurial and cultural accomplishments. His grandfather, Vácslav Havel, a real estate developer, built a landmark entertainment complex on Prague's Wenceslas Square. His father, Václav Maria Havel, was the real estate developer behind the suburban Barrandov Terraces, located on the highest point of Prague—next door to which his uncle, Miloš Havel, built one of the largest film studios in Europe. Havel's mother, Božena Vavrečková, also came from an influential family; her father was a Czechoslovak ambassador and a well-known journalist.

In the early 1950s, because of his class background, Havel entered into a four-year apprenticeship as a chemical laboratory assistant and simultaneously took evening classes at a gymnasium. He completed his secondary education in 1954.

For political reasons, he was not accepted into any post-secondary school with a humanities program; therefore, he opted for studies at the Faculty of Economics of the Czech Technical University in Prague but dropped out after two years. On 9 July 1964, Havel married Olga Šplíchalová.

== Early theatre career ==
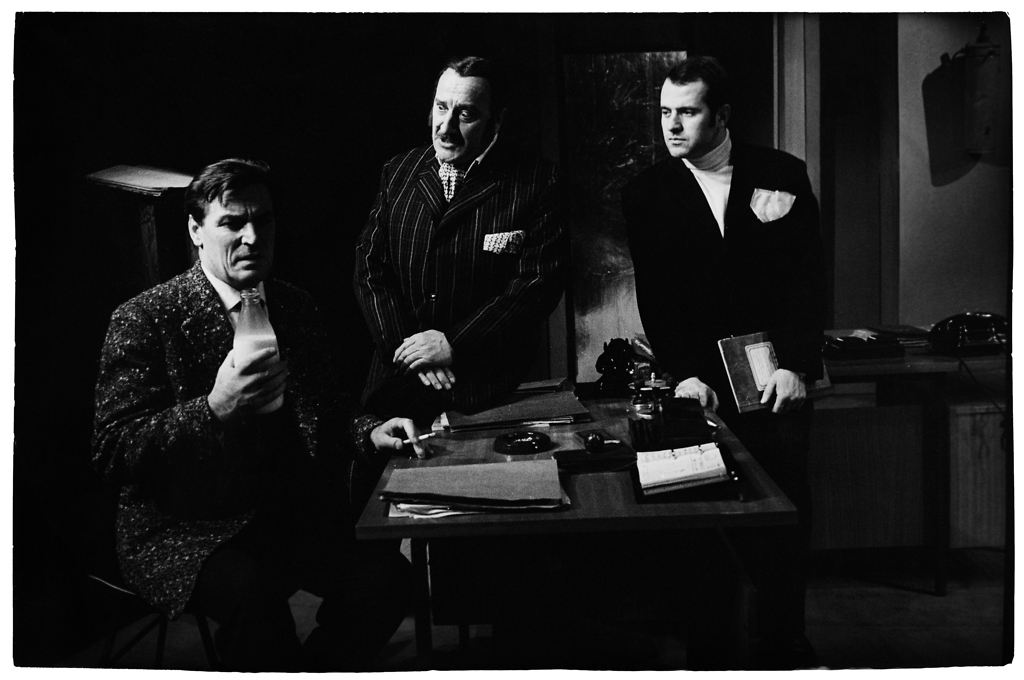
The Memorandum by the Ljubljana Drama Theatre in 1969

The intellectual tradition of his family was essential for Havel's lifetime adherence to the humanitarian values of the Czech culture. After finishing his military service (1957–59), Havel had to bring his intellectual ambitions in line with the given circumstances, especially with the restrictions imposed on him as a descendant of a bourgeois family. He found employment in Prague's theatre world as a stagehand at Prague's Theatre ABC – Divadlo ABC, and then at the Theatre on Balustrade – Divadlo Na zábradlí. Simultaneously, he was a student of dramatic arts by correspondence at the Theatre Faculty of the Academy of Performing Arts in Prague (DAMU). His first own full-length play performed in public, besides various vaudeville collaborations, was The Garden Party (1963). Presented in a series of Theatre of the Absurd, at the Theatre on Balustrade, this play won him international acclaim. The play was soon followed by The Memorandum, one of his best known plays, and The Increased Difficulty of Concentration, all at the Theatre on Balustrade. In 1968, The Memorandum was also brought to The Public Theater in New York, which helped to establish Havel's reputation in the United States. The Public Theater continued to produce his plays in the following years. After 1968, Havel's plays were banned from the theatre world in his own country, and he was unable to leave Czechoslovakia to see any foreign performances of his works.

== Political dissident ==
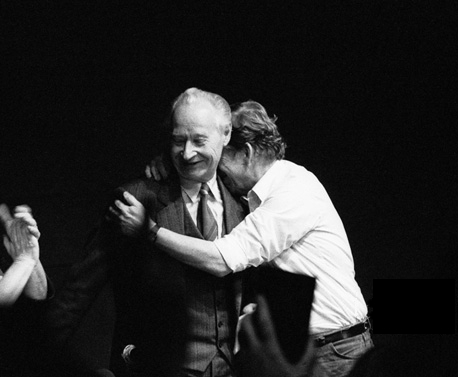
Havel embraces the former Communist leader Alexander Dubček at a meeting in the Laterna Magika theatre in Prague on 24 November 1989

During the first week of the Warsaw Pact invasion of Czechoslovakia in August 1968, Havel assisted the resistance by providing an on-air narrative via Radio Free Czechoslovakia station (at Liberec). Following the suppression of the Prague Spring in 1968, he was banned from the theatre and became more politically active. He took a job at Krakonoš brewery in Trutnov, an experience he wrote about in his play Audience. This play, along with two other "Vaněk" plays (so-called because of the recurring character Ferdinand Vaněk, a stand in for Havel), became distributed in samizdat form across Czechoslovakia, and greatly added to Havel's reputation of being a leading dissident (several other Czech writers later wrote their own plays featuring Vaněk). This reputation was cemented with the publication of the Charter 77 manifesto, written partially in response to the imprisonment of members of the Czech psychedelic rock band The Plastic People of the Universe; Havel had attended their trial, which centered on the group's non-conformity in having long hair, using obscenities in their music, and their overall involvement in the Prague underground movement. Havel co-founded the Committee for the Defense of the Unjustly Prosecuted in 1979. His political activities resulted in multiple imprisonments by the authorities, and constant government surveillance and questioning by the secret police (Státní bezpečnost). His longest period in prison, from May 1979 to February 1983, is documented in letters to his wife that were later published as Letters to Olga.

He was known for his essays, most particularly The Power of the Powerless (1978), in which he described a societal paradigm in which citizens were forced to "live within a lie" under the Communist regime. In describing his role as a dissident, Havel wrote in 1979: "we never decided to become dissidents. We have been transformed into them, without quite knowing how, sometimes we have ended up in prison without precisely knowing how. We simply went ahead and did certain things that we felt we ought to do, and that seemed to us decent to do, nothing more nor less."

Samuel Beckett's 1982 short play, Catastrophe, was dedicated to Havel while he was held as a political prisoner in Czechoslovakia. Both plays were published by Index on Censorship, which in 2022 requested a followup play on similar themes from the Iranian playwright Reza Shirmarz.

== Presidency ==
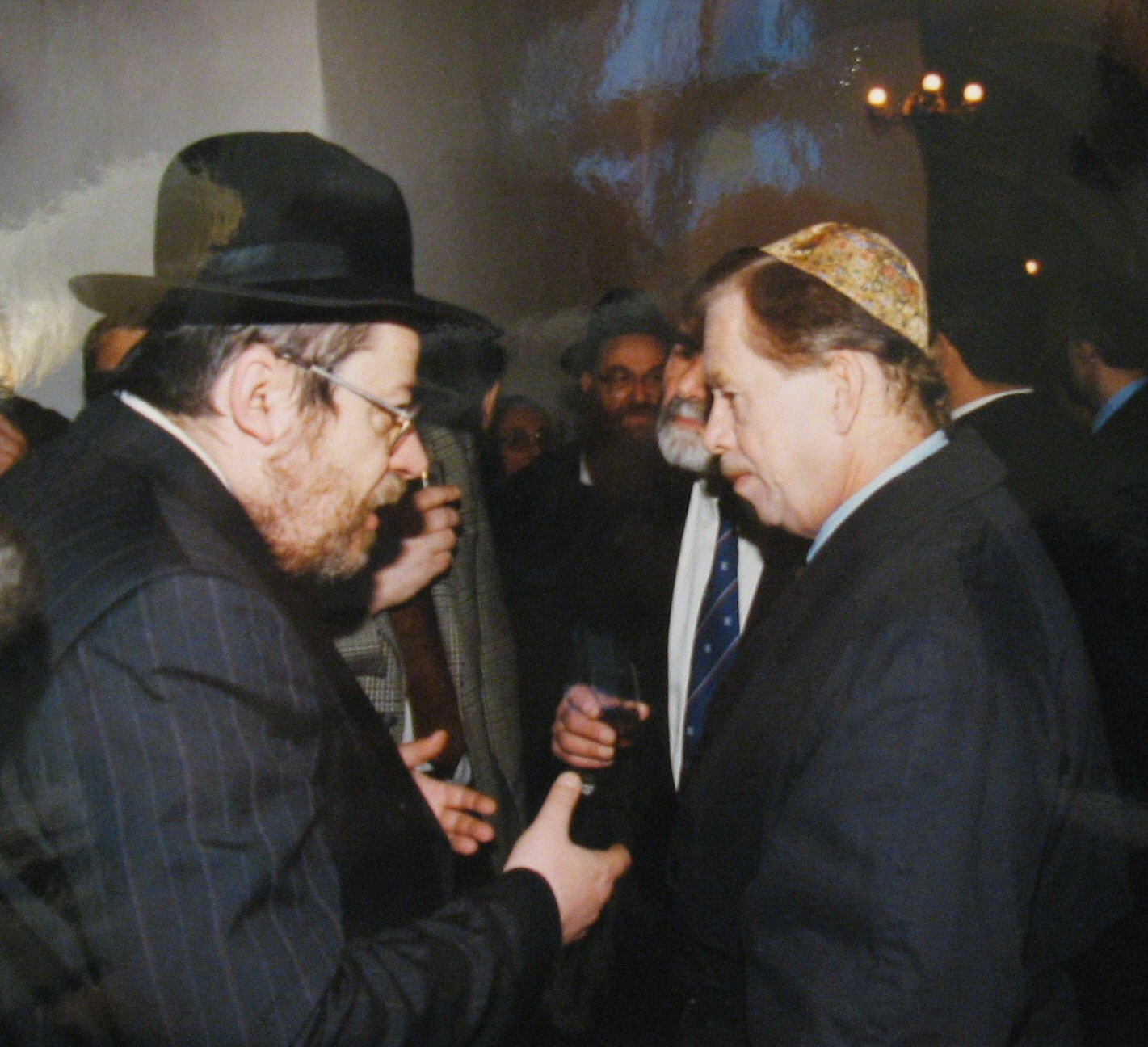
Václav Havel and Karol Sidon (left), his friend and later chief Czech rabbi

Flag of the president of the Czech Republic. The national motto "Truth Prevails" was part of the greater coat of arms of Czechoslovakia during the interwar period.

On 29 December 1989, while he was leader of the Civic Forum, Havel became President of Czechoslovakia by a unanimous vote of the Federal Assembly. He had long insisted that he was not interested in politics and had argued that political change in the country should be induced through autonomous civic initiatives rather than through the official institutions. In 1990, soon after his election, Havel was awarded the Prize For Freedom of the Liberal International.

In 1990, Czechoslovakia held its first free elections in 44 years, resulting in a sweeping victory for Civic Forum and its Slovak counterpart, Public Against Violence. Between them, they commanded strong majorities in both houses of the legislature, and tallied the highest popular vote share recorded for a free election in the country. During his early presidency, Havel gave a number of interviews to foreign media, including to Voice of America correspondent Jolyon Naegele, who had covered Czechoslovak dissident movements throughout the 1980s.

Despite increasing political tensions between the Czechs and the Slovaks in 1992, Havel supported the retention of the Czech and Slovak Federative Republic prior to the dissolution of the country. Havel sought re-election in 1992. Although no other candidate filed, when the vote came on 3 July, he failed to get a majority due to a lack of support from Slovak deputies. The largest Czech political party, the Civic Democratic Party, let it be known that it would not support any other candidate. After the Slovaks issued their Declaration of Independence, he resigned as president on 20 July, saying that he would not preside over the country's breakup.

However, when the Czech Republic was created as one of two successor states, he stood for election as its first president on 26 January 1993, and won. Although he was nominally the new country's chief executive, the framers of the Constitution of the Czech Republic intended to vest most of the real power in the prime minister. However, owing to his prestige, he still commanded great moral authority, and the presidency acquired a greater role than the framers intended. For instance, largely due to his influence, the Communist Party of Bohemia and Moravia (KSCM), successor to the KSC's branch in the Czech Lands, was kept on the margins for most of his presidency. Havel suspected that the KSCM was still an unreformed Stalinist party.

Havel's popularity abroad surpassed his popularity at home, and he was often the object of controversy and criticism. During his time in office, Havel stated that the expulsion of the indigenous Sudeten German population after World War II was immoral, causing a great controversy at home. He also extended general amnesty as one of his first acts as president, in an attempt to lessen the pressure in overcrowded prisons as well as to release political prisoners and persons who may have been falsely imprisoned during the Communist era. Havel felt that many of the decisions by the previous regime's courts should not be trusted, and that most of those in prison had not received fair trials. However, critics claimed that this amnesty led to a significant increase in the crime rate: the total number of crimes doubled, as did the number of murders. Several of the worst crimes in the history of the Czech criminology were committed by criminals released in this amnesty. Within four years of the Velvet Revolution (and following another two amnesties declared by Havel), criminality had more than tripled since 1989.

In an interview with Karel Hvížďala (included in To the Castle and Back), Havel expressed his feeling that it was his most important accomplishment as president to have contributed to the dissolution of the Warsaw Pact. According to his statement the dissolution was very complicated. The infrastructure created by the Warsaw Pact was part of the economies of all member states, and the Pact's dissolution necessitated restructuring that took many years to complete.

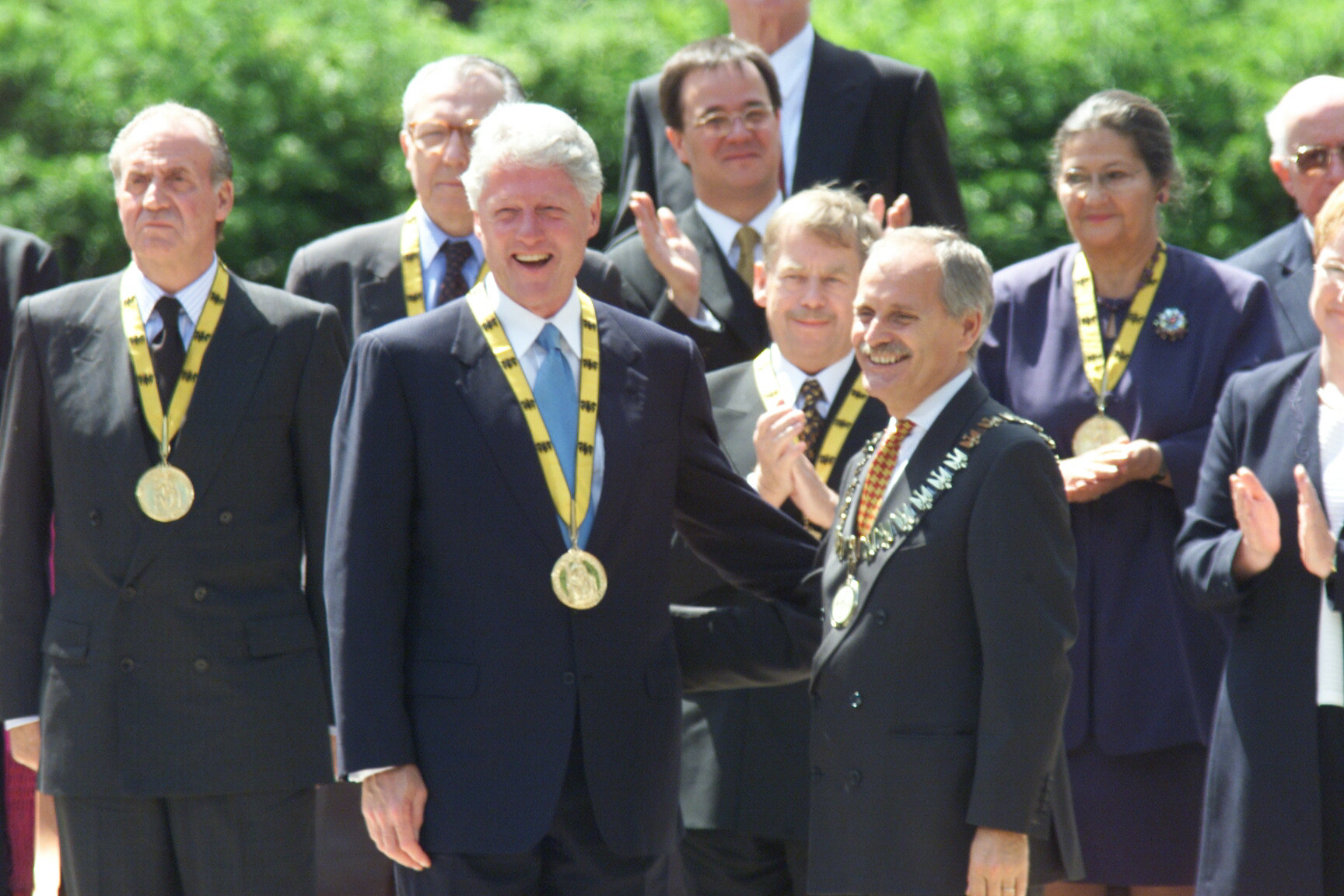
Havel, along with Bill Clinton, King Juan Carlos I of Spain and Simone Veil in 2000

Following a legal dispute with his sister-in-law Dagmar Havlová (wife of his brother Ivan M. Havel), Havel decided to sell his 50% stake in the Lucerna Palace on Wenceslas Square in Prague, built from 1907 to 1921 by his grandfather, also named Václav Havel (spelled Vácslav,) one of the multifunctional "palaces" in the center of the once booming pre-World War II Prague. In a transaction arranged by Marián Čalfa, Havel sold the estate to Václav Junek, a former Communist spy in France and head of the soon-to-be bankrupt conglomerate Chemapol Group, who later openly admitted that he bribed politicians of the Czech Social Democratic Party.

His close friend was Ivan Medek, who became the chief of the president's office.

In January 1996, Olga Havlová, his wife of 32 years, died of cancer at 62. In December 1996, Havel who had been a chain smoker for a long time, was diagnosed with lung cancer. The disease reappeared two years later. He quit smoking. In 1997, he remarried, to actress Dagmar Veškrnová.

Havel was among those influential politicians who contributed most to the transition of NATO from being an anti-Warsaw Pact alliance to its present form. Havel advocated vigorously for the inclusion of former-Warsaw Pact members, like the Czech Republic, into the Western alliance.

Havel was re-elected president in 1998. He had to undergo a colostomy in Innsbruck when his colon ruptured while he was on holiday in Austria.

On 30 January 2003, Havel signed The letter of the eight supporting planned U.S. invasion of Iraq.

Havel left office after his second term as Czech president ended on 2 February 2003. Václav Klaus, one of his greatest political adversaries, was elected his successor as president on 28 February 2003. Margaret Thatcher wrote of the two men in her foreign policy treatise Statecraft, reserving the greater respect for Havel. Havel's dedication to democracy and his steadfast opposition to communist ideology earned him admiration.

== Post-presidential career ==
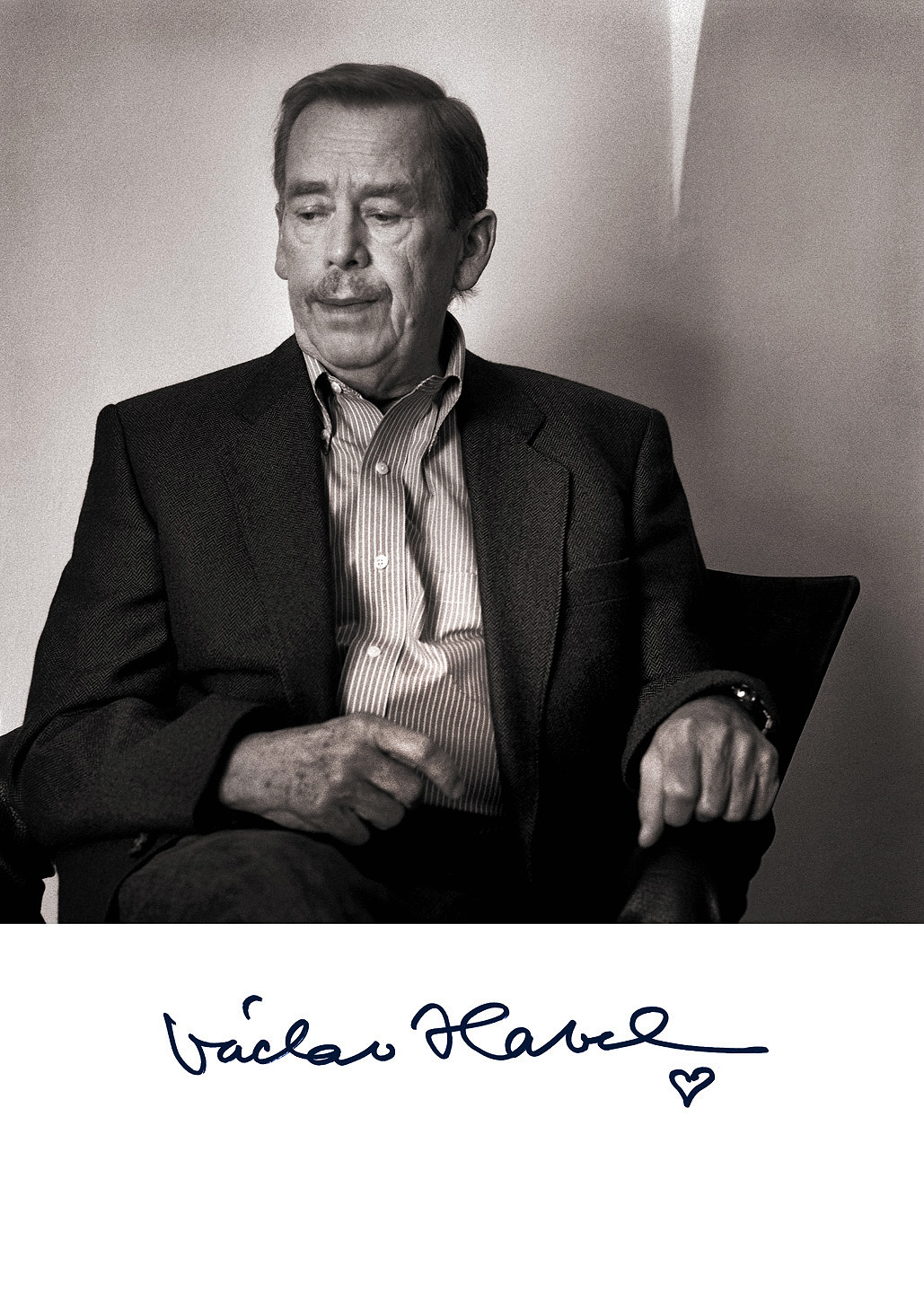
In his post-presidency Havel focused on European affairs.

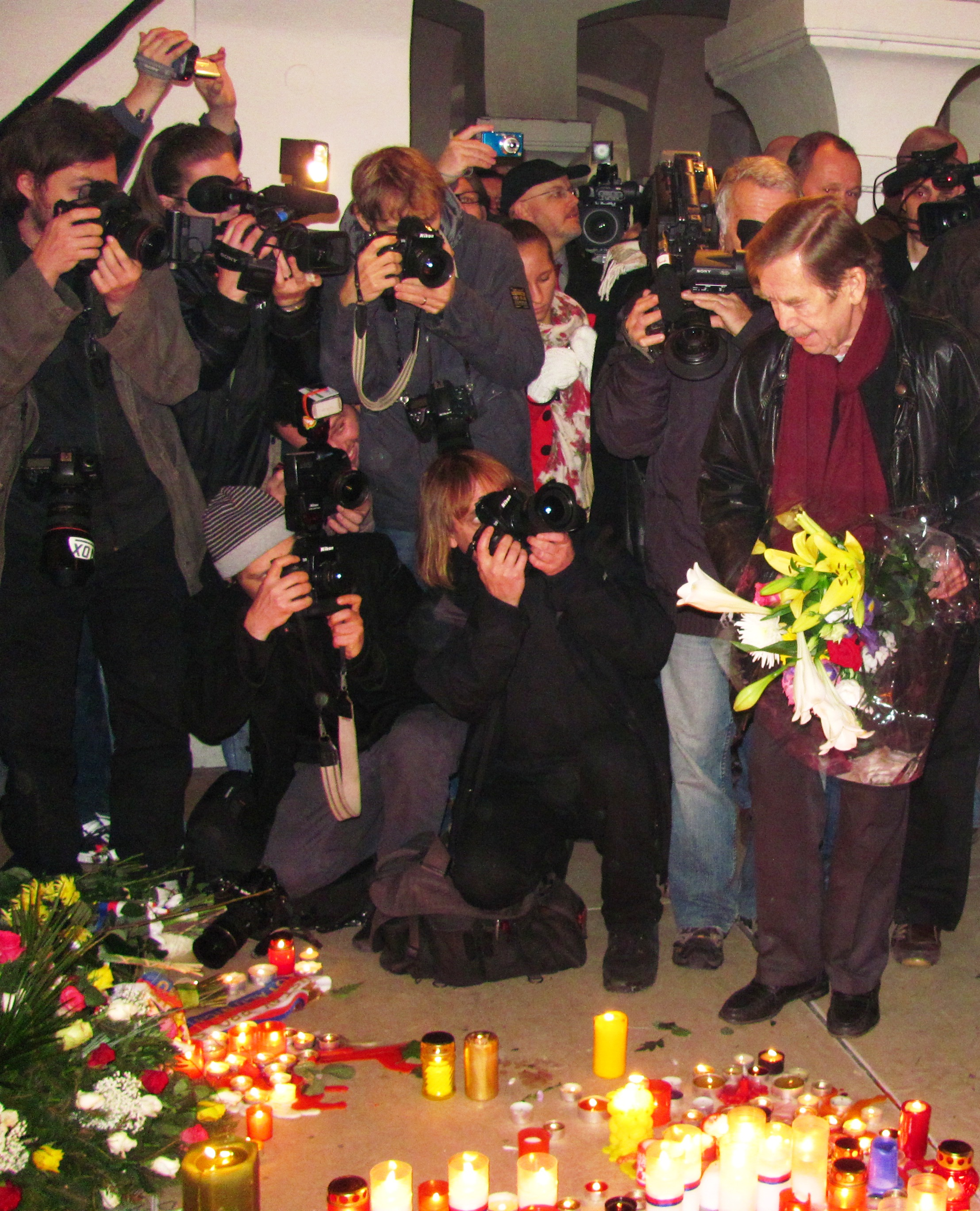
Václav Havel at Velvet Revolution Memorial (Národní Street, Prague) in November 2010

Beginning in 1997, Havel hosted Forum 2000, an annual conference to "identify the key issues facing civilisation and to explore ways to prevent the escalation of conflicts that have religion, culture or ethnicity as their primary components". In 2005, the former president occupied the Kluge Chair for Modern Culture at the John W. Kluge Center of the United States Library of Congress, where he continued his research on human rights. In November and December 2006, Havel spent eight weeks as a visiting artist in residence at Columbia University. The stay was sponsored by the Columbia Arts Initiative and featured "performances, and panels centr[ing] on his life and ideas", including a public "conversation" with former U.S. President Bill Clinton. Concurrently, the Untitled Theater Company No. 61 launched a Havel Festival, the first complete festival of his plays in various venues throughout New York City, including The Brick Theater and the Ohio Theatre, in celebration of his 70th birthday. Havel was a member of the World Future Society and addressed the Society's members on 4 July 1994. His speech was later printed in THE FUTURIST magazine (July 1995).

Havel was greatly admired by Czech citizens. In the poll taken for the 2005 TV show Největší Čech (the Czech spin-off of the BBC 100 Greatest Britons), Havel placed third.

Havel's memoir of his experience as president, To the Castle and Back, was published in May 2007. The book mixes an interview in the style of Disturbing the Peace with actual memoranda he sent to his staff and modern diary entries and recollections.

On 4 August 2007, Havel met with members of the Belarus Free Theatre at his summer cottage in the Czech Republic in a show of his continuing support, which has been instrumental in the theatre's attaining international recognition and membership in the European Theatrical Convention.

Havel went on a hunger strike in 2007 to support Kurdish doctor and human rights activist Yekta Uzunoglu in his legal battle. A former president going on a hunger strike to support the legal battle of a foreigner in his country was a first in world history.

Havel's first new play in almost two decades, Leaving, was published in November 2007, and was to have had its world premiere in June 2008 at the Prague Vinohrady Theatre, but the theater withdrew it in December as it felt it could not provide the technical support needed to mount the play. The play instead premiered on 22 May 2008 at the Archa Theatre to standing ovations. Havel based the play on King Lear, by William Shakespeare, and on The Cherry Orchard, by Anton Chekhov; "Chancellor Vilém Rieger is the central character of Leaving, who faces a crisis after being removed from political power." The play had its English language premiere at the Orange Tree Theatre in London and its American premiere at The Wilma Theater in Philadelphia. Havel subsequently directed a film version of the play, which premiered in the Czech Republic on 22 March 2011.

Other works included the short sketch Pět Tet, a modern sequel to Unveiling, and The Pig, or Václav Havel's Hunt for a Pig, which was premiered in Brno at Theatre Goose on a String and had its English language premiere at the 3LD Art & Technology Center in New York, in a production from Untitled Theater Company No. 61, in a production workshopped in the Ice Factory Festival in 2011 and later revived as a full production in 2014, becoming a New York Times Critic's Pick.

In 2008, Havel became a Member of the European Council on Tolerance and Reconciliation. He met U.S. President Barack Obama in private before Obama's departure after the end of the European Union (EU) and United States (US) summit in Prague in April 2009. Havel was the chair of the Human Rights Foundation's International Council and a member of the international advisory council of the Victims of Communism Memorial Foundation.

Havel was a supporter of the Campaign for the Establishment of a United Nations Parliamentary Assembly, an organisation which campaigns for democratic reformation of the United Nations, and the creation of a more accountable international political system. From the 1980s, Havel supported the green politics movement, partly due to his friendship with the co-founder of the German Alliance 90/The Greens party Milan Horáček. From 2004 until his death, he supported the Czech Green Party.

== Death ==
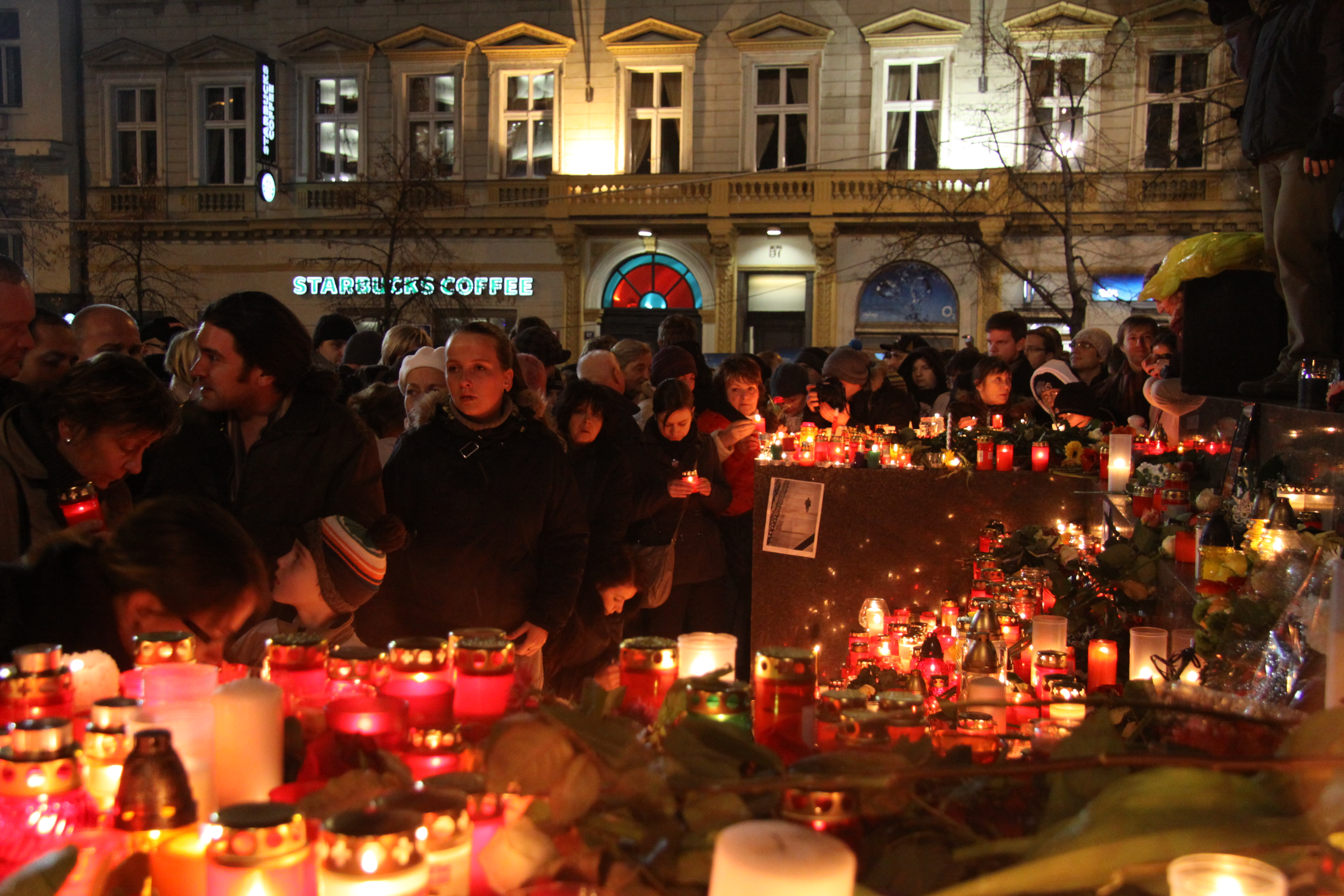
Memorial gathering of Václav Havel in Wenceslas Square in Prague on the day of his death on 18 December 2011

A week before his death, he met with his long-time friend, the Dalai Lama, in Prague; Havel appeared in a wheelchair. He died in the morning of 18 December 2011, at the age of 75, at his country home in Hrádeček.

Prime Minister Petr Nečas announced a three-day mourning period from 21 to 23 December, the date announced by President Václav Klaus for the state funeral. The funeral Mass was held at Saint Vitus Cathedral, celebrated by the Archbishop of Prague Dominik Duka and Havel's old friend Bishop Václav Malý. During the service, a 21 gun salute was fired in the former president's honour, and in accordance with the family's request, a private ceremony followed at Prague's Strašnice Crematorium, where he was cremated. Havel's ashes were placed in the family tomb in the Vinohrady Cemetery in Prague. On 23 December 2011, the Václav Havel Tribute Concert was held in Prague's Palác Lucerna.

=== Reactions ===
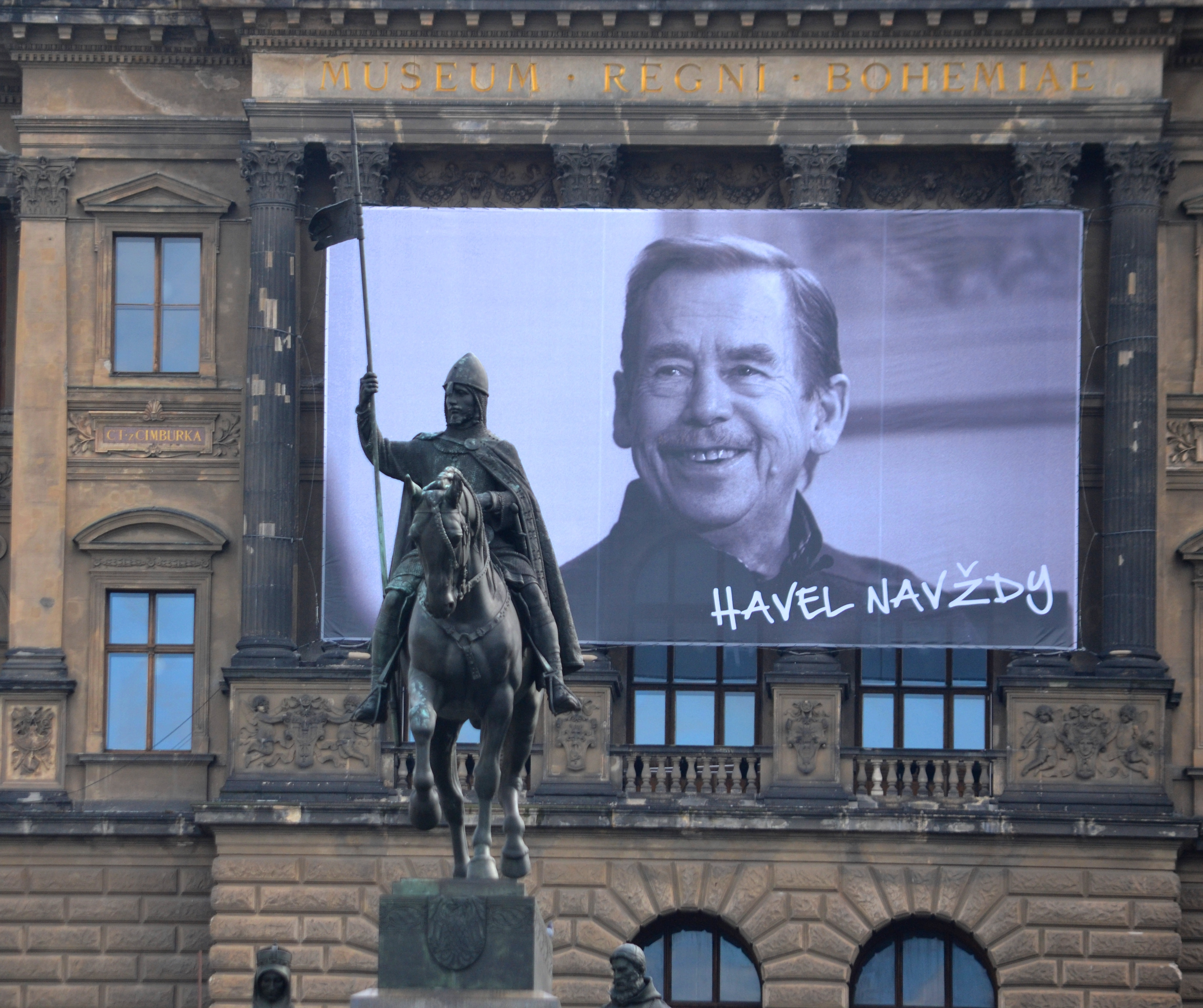
A large tapestry of Václav Havel with the caption Havel Forever was unveiled on Wenceslas Square on 17 November 2014, the 25th anniversary of the Velvet Revolution.

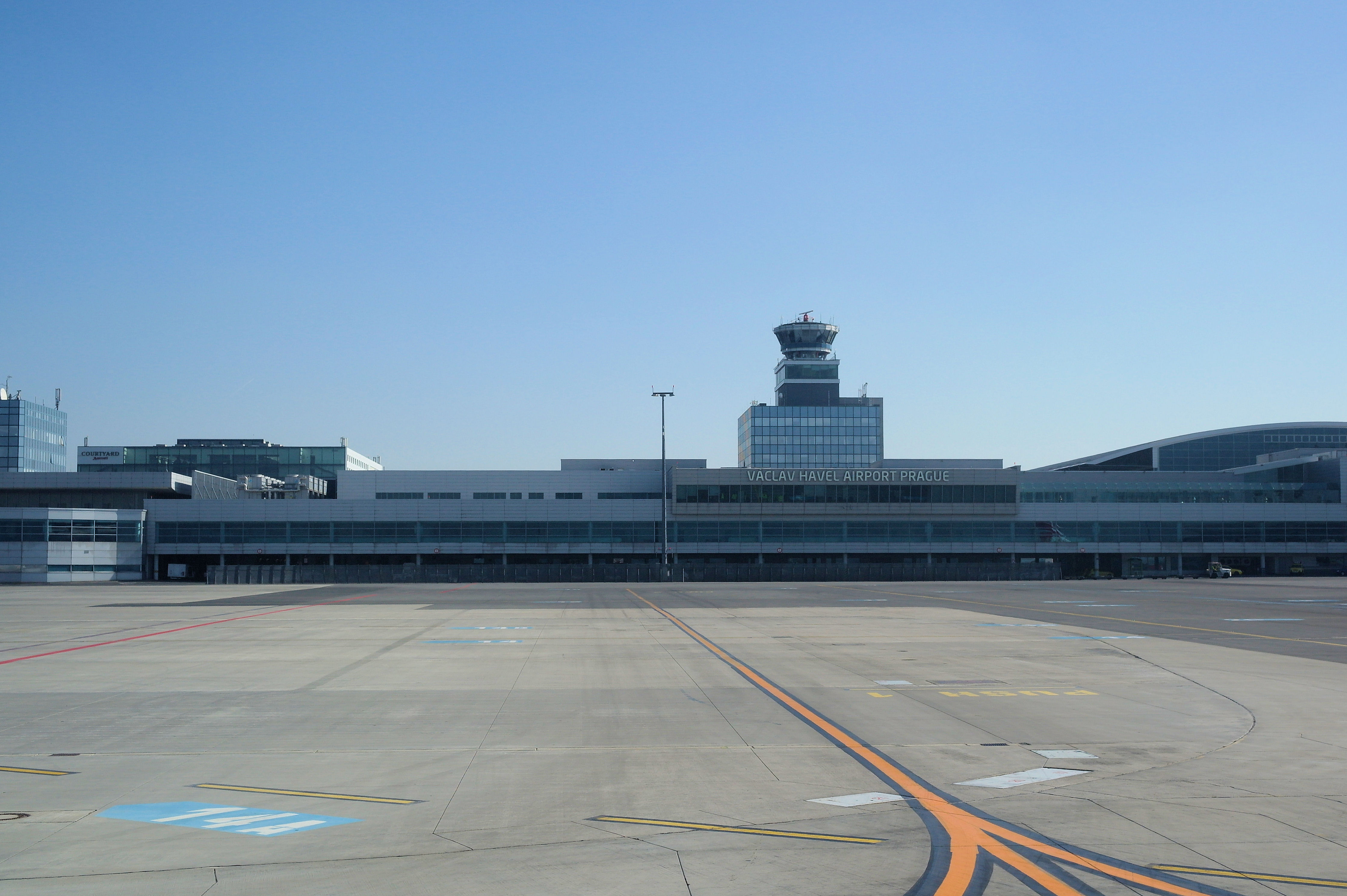
The international airport in Prague was renamed to Václav Havel Airport Prague

Within hours Havel's death was met with numerous tributes, including from U.S. President Barack Obama, British Prime Minister David Cameron, German Chancellor Angela Merkel and former Polish President Lech Wałęsa. Merkel called Havel "a great European", while Wałęsa said he should have been given the Nobel Peace Prize. The Russian Embassy sent an official condolence on behalf of the President Dmitry Medvedev and Prime Minister Vladimir Putin. Slovakia declared 23 December a day of national mourning.

At the news of his death, former U.S. Secretary of State Madeleine Albright, a native of Czechoslovakia, said, "He was one of the great figures of the 20th Century", while Czech expatriate novelist Milan Kundera said: "Václav Havel's most important work is his own life." Leader of Communist Party of Bohemia and Moravia, Vojtěch Filip, stated that Havel was a very controversial person and that his words often conflicted with his deeds. He criticized Havel for having supported the NATO bombing of Yugoslavia, repeating the charge that Havel had called the event a "humanitarian bombing", although Havel had expressly and emphatically denied ever using such a phrase.

An online petition organized by one of the best-known Czech and Slovak film directors, Fero Fenič, calling on the government and the Parliament to rename Prague Ruzyně Airport to Václav Havel International Airport attracted—in a week after 20 December 2011—support of over 80,000 Czech Republic and foreign signatories. It was announced that the airport would be renamed the Václav Havel Airport Prague on 5 October 2012.

Reviewing a new biography by Michael Žantovský, Yale historian Marci Shore summarized his challenges as president: "Havel's message, 'We are all responsible, we are all guilty,' was not popular. He enacted a general amnesty for all but the most serious criminals, apologized on behalf of Czechoslovakia for the post-World War II expulsion of the Sudeten Germans and resisted demands for a more draconian purge of secret police collaborators. These things were not popular either. And as the government undertook privatization and restitution, Havel confronted pyramid schemes, financial corruption and robber baron capitalism. He saw his country fall apart (if bloodlessly), becoming in 1993 the Czech Republic and Slovakia."

== Awards ==
In 1986, Havel received the Erasmus Prize, in 1989 the Friedenspreis des Deutschen Buchhandels, and in 1990, he received the Gottlieb Duttweiler Prize for his outstanding contributions to the well-being of the wider community. In the same year he received the Freedom medal.

In 1993, he was elected an Honorary Fellow of the Royal Society of Literature.

On 4 July 1994, Václav Havel was awarded the Philadelphia Liberty Medal. In his acceptance speech, he said: "The idea of human rights and freedoms must be an integral part of any meaningful world order. Yet I think it must be anchored in a different place, and in a different way, than has been the case so far. If it is to be more than just a slogan mocked by half the world, it cannot be expressed in the language of departing era, and it must not be mere froth floating on the subsiding waters of faith in a purely scientific relationship to the world."

Havel was elected to the American Philosophical Society in 1995.

In 1997, Havel received ex aequo the Prince of Asturias Award for Communication and Humanities and the Prix mondial Cino Del Duca.

In 1998, the jury of the Europe Theatre Prize awarded him a special prize by the President Jack Lang.

In 2001, he was elected to the American Academy of Arts and Sciences.

In 2002, he was the third recipient of the Hanno R. Ellenbogen Citizenship Award presented by the Prague Society for International Cooperation. In 2003, he was awarded the International Gandhi Peace Prize by the government of India for his outstanding contribution towards world peace and upholding human rights in most difficult situations through Gandhian means; he was the inaugural recipient of Amnesty International's Ambassador of Conscience Award for his work in promoting human rights; he received the US Presidential Medal of Freedom; and he was appointed as an honorary Companion of the Order of Canada.

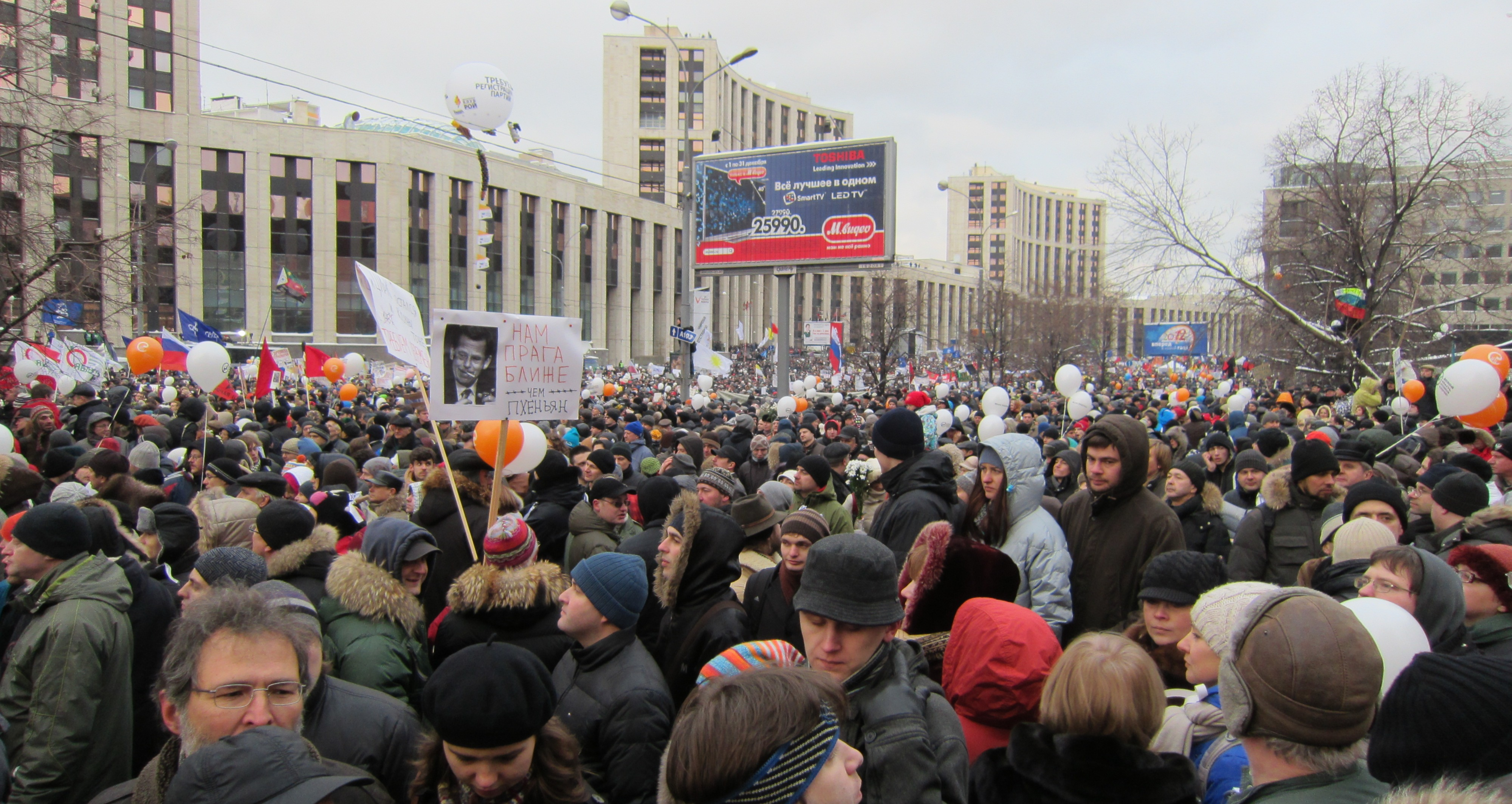
Russian protesters hold portrait of Václav Havel during an anti-regime demonstration in Moscow, 24 December 2011. The text on the sign translates to "We prefer Prague to Pyongyang" (lit. "Prague is closer to us than Pyongyang is")

In 2008 he was also awarded the Giuseppe Motta Medal for support for peace and democracy. As a former Czech President, Havel was a member of the Club of Madrid. In 2009 he was awarded the Quadriga Award, but decided to return it in 2011 following the announcement of Vladimir Putin as one of the 2011 award recipients.

Havel also received multiple honorary doctorates from various universities such as the prestigious Institut d'études politiques de Paris (Sciences Po) in 2009, and was a Foreign Associate Member of the French Académie des Sciences Morales et Politiques from October 1992 until his death.

On 10 October 2011, Havel was awarded by the Georgian President Mikheil Saakashvili with the St. George Victory Order. In November 2014, he became only the fourth non-American honored with a bust in the U.S. Capitol.

== State honours and awards ==
=== Honours ===
Country	Honours	Medal Ribbon	Date	City
Argentina	Order of the Liberator San Martin Collar		September 1996	Buenos Aires
Austria	Decoration for Science and Art		November 2005	Vienna
Brazil	Order of the Southern Cross Grand Collar		October 1990	Prague
Brazil	Order of Rio Branco Grand Cross		September 1996	Brasília
Canada	Order of Canada Honorary Companion		March 2004	Prague
Czech Republic	Order of the White Lion 1st Class (Civil Division) with Collar Chain		October 2003	Prague
Czech Republic	Order of Tomáš Garrigue Masaryk 1st Class		October 2003	Prague
Estonia	Order of the Cross of Terra Mariana The Collar of the Cross		April 1996	Tallinn
France	Légion d'honneur Grand Cross		March 1990	Paris
France	Order of Arts and Letters Commander		February 2001	Paris
Georgia	St. George's Order of Victory		October 2011	Prague
Germany	Order of Merit of the Federal Republic of Germany Special class of the Grand Cross		May 2000	Berlin
Hungary	Order of Merit of Hungary Grand Cross with Chain		September 2001	Prague
Italy	Order of Merit of the Italian Republic Grand Cross with Cordon		April 2002	Rome
Jordan	Order of al-Hussein bin Ali Collar		September 1997	Amman
Latvia	Order of the Three Stars Commander Grand Cross with Chain		August 1999	Prague
Lithuania	Order of Vytautas the Great Grand Cross		September 1999	Prague
Poland	Order of the White Eagle		October 1993	Warsaw
Portugal	Order of Liberty Grand Collar		December 1990	Lisbon
Taiwan	Order of Brilliant Star with Special Grand Cordon		November 2004	Taipei
Slovakia	Order of the White Double Cross First Class		January 2003	Bratislava
Slovenia	The Golden honorary Medal of Freedom		November 1993	Ljubljana
Spain	Order of Isabella the Catholic Grand Cross with Collar		July 1995	Prague
Turkey	First Class of the Order of the State of Republic of Turkey		October 2000	Ankara
Ukraine	Order of Yaroslav the Wise		October 2006	Prague
United Kingdom	Order of the Bath Knight Grand Cross (Civil Division)		March 1996	Prague
United States	Presidential Medal of Freedom		July 2003	Washington, D.C.
Uruguay	Medal of the Oriental Republic of Uruguay		September 1996	Montevideo

=== Awards ===
- India: Indira Gandhi Peace Prize (1993), New Delhi
- Netherlands: Geuzenpenning (1995), Vlaardingen
- European Union: Europe Theatre Prize - Special Prize (1998), Taormina
- India: Gandhi Peace Prize (08/2003), Delhi

== Memorials ==
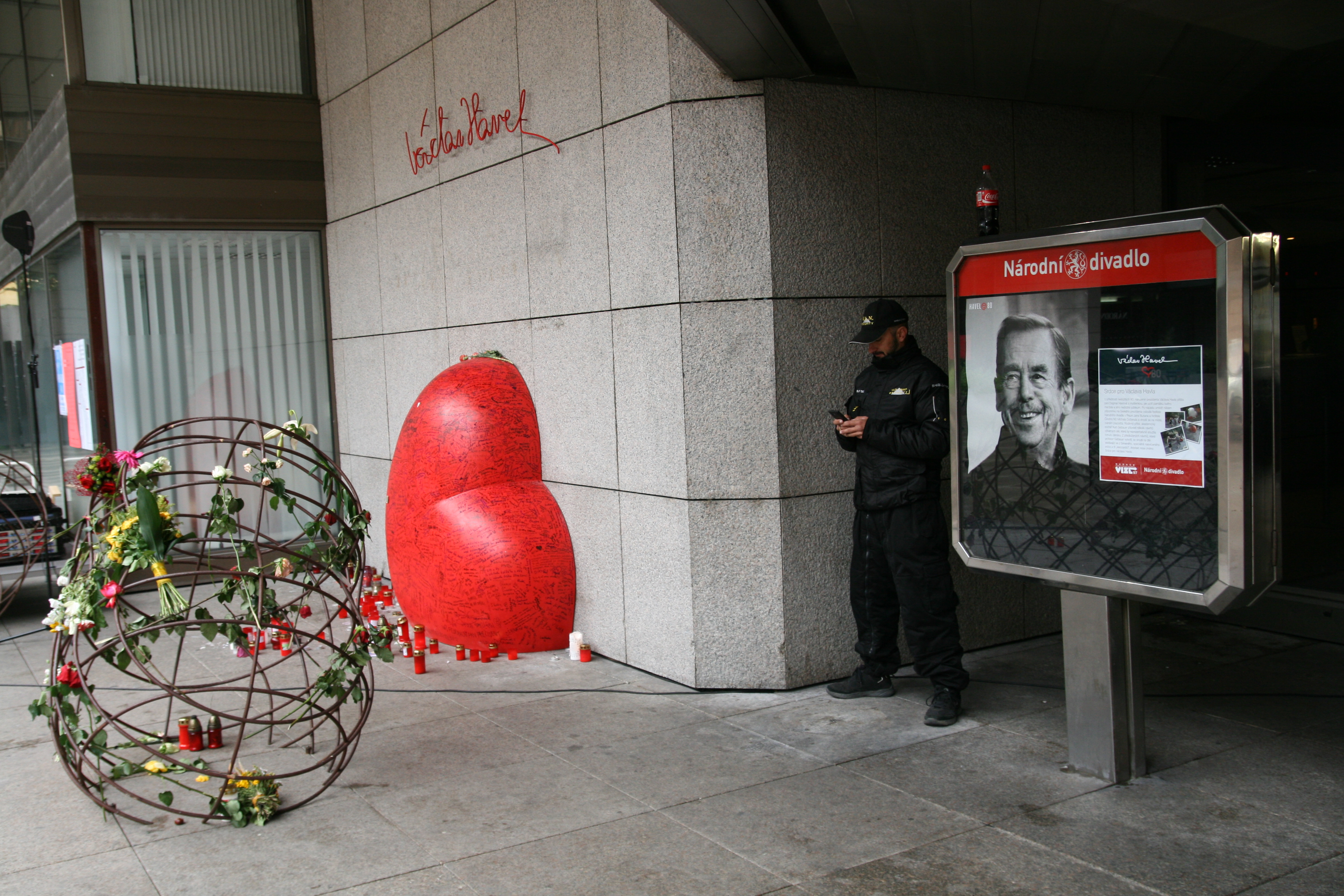
Václav Havel Square in Prague, 2016

=== Václav Havel Prize for Creative Dissent ===
In April 2012, Havel's widow, Dagmar Havlová, authorized the creation of the Václav Havel Prize for Creative Dissent. The prize was created by the New York-based Human Rights Foundation and is awarded at the annual Oslo Freedom Forum. The prize "will celebrate those who engage in creative dissent, exhibiting courage and creativity to challenge injustice and live in truth".

=== Václav Havel Library ===
The Václav Havel Library, located in Prague, is a charitable organization founded by Dagmar Havlová, Karel Schwarzenberg and Miloslav Petrusek on 26 July 2004. It maintains a collection of pictorial, audio and written materials and other artefacts linked to Václav Havel. The institution gathers these materials for the purpose of digitisation, documentation and research and to promote his ideas. It organises lectures, holds conferences and social and cultural events that introduce the public to the work of Václav Havel and club discussion meetings on current social issues.

In May 2012, the library opened a branch in New York City named the Václav Havel Library Foundation. In 2014, the Václav Havel Library moved to larger premises at Ostrovni 13, in the centre of Prague.

=== Václav Havel Building of the European Parliament ===
In July 2017, the European Parliament opened a new building on its official Strasbourg site. The building was named after Havel and decorated with a bust of the former Czech president.

=== Václav Havel Memory in Zagreb ===
On 4 October 2016, the day before what would have been the 80th birthday of Václav Havel, his photograph was presented on a fountain in Croatian capital Zagreb. Croatian-Czech Society proposed the Václav Havel Street in Zagreb.

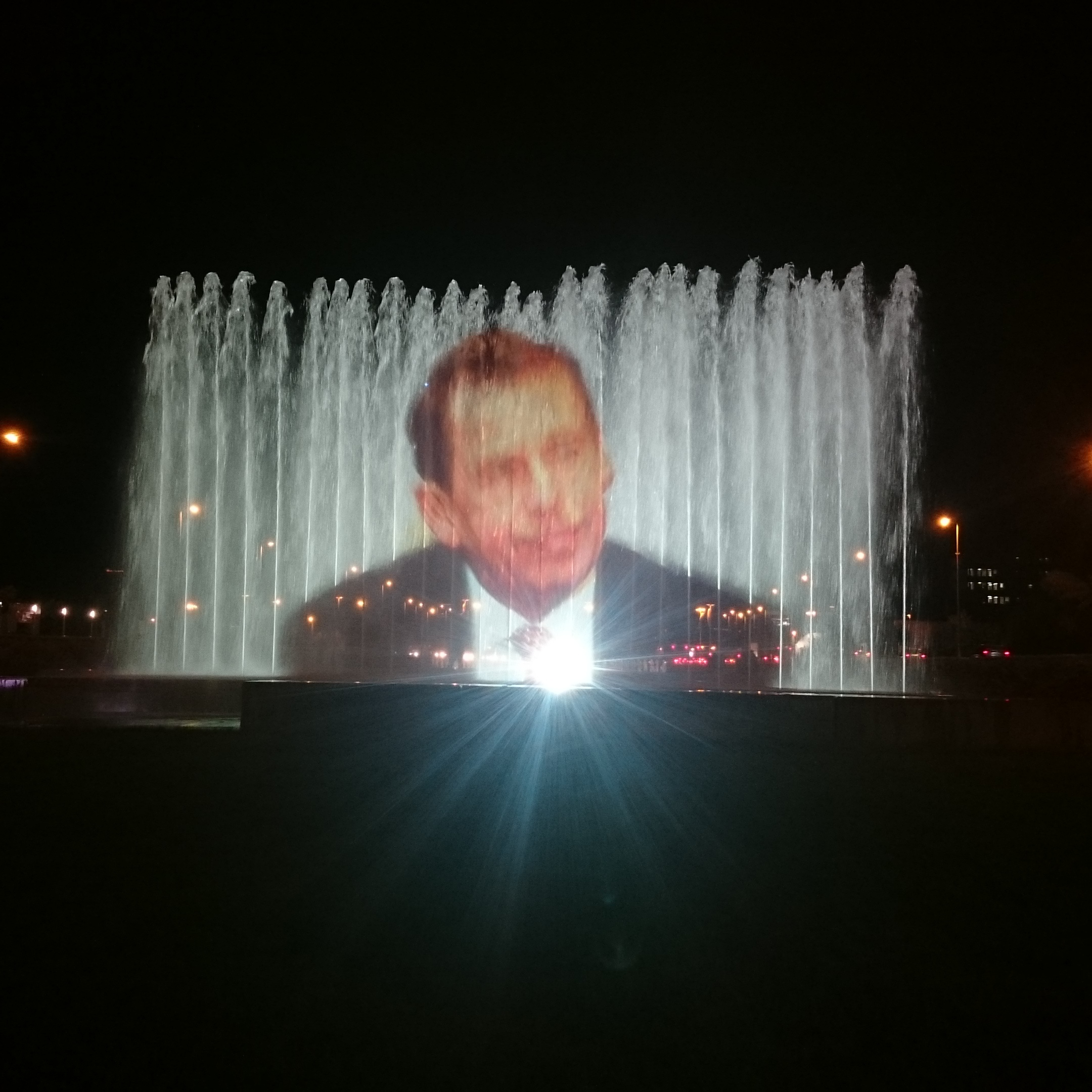
Václav Havel photograph on a fountain in Zagreb, Croatia

=== Václav Havel Boulevard and memorial plaque in Kyiv ===
In November 2016, Václav Havel Boulevard was opened in Kyiv, Ukraine. The new name has replaced the one given during Soviet era when boulevard was named in honor of the Communist politician Jānis Lepse. In December, First Deputy Chairman Iryna Herashchenko along with Minister of Culture of Czech Republic Daniel Herman and Minister of Culture of Ukraine Yevhen Nyshchuk opened memorial plaque in honor of Václav Havel.

=== Václav Havel Bench ===
The Václav Havel Bench (Havel's Place) is an artistic and urban utility project, created by Czech architect and designer Bořek Šípek. It is composed of two wooden garden chairs connected by a round table, which has a hole inside. A linden, the Czech national tree, is growing through this hole. These benches can be found in many Czech towns as well as in some foreign locations such as Washington, D.C., Dublin, Lisbon, Oxford, and Barcelona.

=== Sculptures and busts ===
On 19 November 2014, a bust of Havel, created by Czech-American artist Lubomír Janečka, was unveiled at the U.S. Congress, commemorating the 25-year anniversary of the Velvet Revolution. Havel is the fourth European ever to be honored by having a bust of himself in the U.S. Congress, after Winston Churchill, Raoul Wallenberg and Lajos Kossuth. Another sculpture of Havel is placed in a boardroom of Leinster House in Dublin, the historical seat of the Oireachtas, the Irish National Parliament.

On 22 June 2017 a statue of Václav Havel created by Georgian sculptor Jumber Jikia was unveiled in Tbilisi, Georgia.

The Václav Havel Library Foundation donated a bust of Havel to Columbia University in New York City. This bust was unveiled on 27 September 2018 while Havel was being honored by former US Secretary of State Madeleine Albright.

== Works ==
=== Collections of poetry ===
- Čtyři rané básně (Four Early Poems)
- Záchvěvy I & II, 1954 (Quivers I & II)
- První úpisy, 1955 (First promissory notes)
- Prostory a časy, 1956 (Spaces and times)
- Na okraji jara (cyklus básní), 1956 (At the edge of spring (poetry cycle))
- Antikódy, 1964 (Anticodes)

=== Plays ===
- Life Ahead/You Have Your Whole Life Ahead of You, 1959, (Život před sebou) with Karel Brynda
- Motomorphosis/Motormorphosis, 1960/1961, (Motomorfóza), a sketch from Autostop
- Ela, Hela, and the Hitch, 1960/1961, (Ela, Hela a stop), a sketch for Autostop; discarded from the play, lost; found in 2009; published in 2011
- An Evening with the Family, 1960, (Rodinný večer)
- The Best Years of Missis Hermanová, 1962, (Nejlepší rocky paní Hermanové) with Miloš Macourek
- The Garden Party (Zahradní slavnost), 1963
- The Memorandum (or The Memo), 1965, (Vyrozumění)
- The Increased Difficulty of Concentration, 1968, (Ztížená možnost soustředění)
- Butterfly on the Antenna, 1968, (Motýl na anténě)
- Guardian Angel, 1968, (Anděl strážný)
- Conspirators, 1971, (Spiklenci)
- The Beggar's Opera, 1975, (Žebrácká opera)
- Audience, 1975, (Audience) – a Vanӗk play
- Unveiling, 1975, (Vernisáž) – a Vanӗk play
- Mountain Hotel 1976, (Horský hotel)
- Protest, 1978, (Protest) – a Vanӗk play
- Mistake, 1983, (Chyba)
- Largo desolato 1984, (Largo desolato)
- Temptation, 1985, (Pokoušení)
- Redevelopment, 1987, (Asanace)
- The Pig, or Václav Havel's Hunt for a Pig (Prase, aneb Václav Havel's Hunt for a Pig), 1987; published in 2010; premiered in 2010, co-authored by Vladimír Morávek
- Tomorrow, 1988, (Zítra to spustíme)
- Leaving (Odcházení), 2007
- Dozens of Cousins (Pět Tet), 2010, a Vanӗk play, a short sketch/sequel to Unveiling

=== Nonfiction books ===
- The Power of the Powerless (1985) [Includes 1978 titular essay]
- Living in Truth (1986)
- Letters to Olga (Dopisy Olze) (1988)
- Disturbing the Peace (1991)
- Open Letters (1991)
- Summer Meditations (Letní přemítání) (1992/93)
- Toward a Civil Society (1994)
- The Art of the Impossible (1998)
- To the Castle and Back (2007)

=== Fiction books for children ===
- Pizh'duks

=== Films ===
- Odcházení, 2011

== Music ==
- Havel was a major supporter of The Plastic People of the Universe, and close friend of its leader, Milan Hlavsa, its manager, Ivan Martin Jirous, and its guitarist/vocalist, Paul Wilson (who later became Havel's English translator and biographer) and a great fan of the rock band The Velvet Underground, sharing mutual respect with the principal singer-songwriter Lou Reed. Reed interviewed Havel in his book "Between Thought And Expression." Havel was also a lifelong Frank Zappa fan.
- Havel was also a great supporter and fan of jazz and frequented such Prague clubs as Radost FX and the Reduta Jazz Club, where U.S. President Bill Clinton played the saxophone when Havel brought him there.
- Havel befriended Joan Baez after he evaded arrest by pretending to be her roadie.

== Cultural references ==
Václav Havel has been portrayed, as himself or a character based on him, in a number of feature and television films:

- Czech Century is a 2013 historical television series chronicling Czech history from 1989. Havel is portrayed by Marek Daniel.
  - Marek Daniel also portrayed Havel in a satirical web series, Kancelář Blaník.
- Havel is a 2020 historical film about Havel's (Viktor Dvořák) life before 1989.
- The Prog-related Art-rock band, Toy Matinee, recorded a song about Havel, entitled "Remember My Name" from their 1990 eponymous album released by Reprise Records.
- Havel is mentioned in the song "La Vie Bohème" from the 1996 musical Rent. "Original Broadway Cast: La Vie Bohème A". Genius.com.
- Havel is an incredibly strong, heavily armored, dragon-tooth-wielding NPC character in the Dark Souls series.

== See also ==
- Civil resistance
- Hrad (politics)
- List of peace activists
- Nonviolent resistance
- Mlýny, Czech comedy play
- Václav Havel Human Rights Prize

Political offices
Preceded by Marián Čalfa; Acting	President of Czechoslovakia; 1989–1992	Office abolished
New office	President of the Czech Republic; 1993–2003	Succeeded by Václav Klaus
