= Klement Gottwald Military Political Academy =

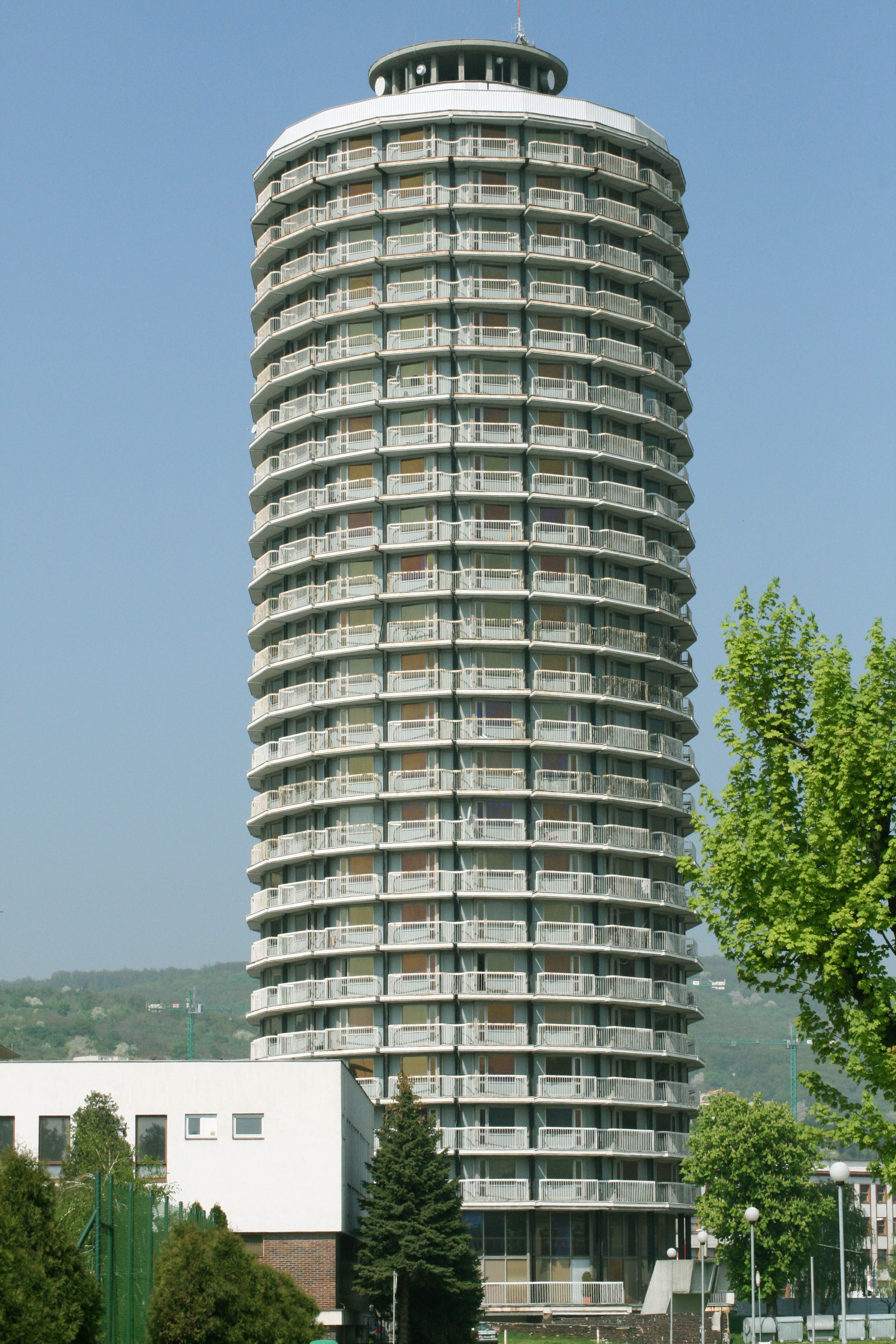
The former dormitory of the academy.

The Klement Gottwald Military Political Academy (Czech: Vojenská politická akademie Klementa Gottwalda, abbreviation VPA KG) was a military academy under the Main Political Administration of the Czechoslovak People's Army. It was based in Bratislava, the capital of the Slovak Socialist Republic, a federal subject of the Czechoslovak Socialist Republic (and later Czech and Slovak Federative Republic). prepared cadres for the political apparatus of the Czechoslovak People's Army.

== History ==
Its predecessor institution was a military political school first located in Prague, from 1953 to 1969. After the abolition of the academy in Prague, the so-called Faculty of Social Sciences in Bratislava was established on 1 September 1969, forming part of the Antonín Zápotocký Military Academy in Brno (currently the University of Defence). On 31 August 1972, this faculty was abolished and on its basis the Military Political Academy in Bratislava was established on 1 September 1972. After the Velvet Revolution, it was renamed the Higher Military Pedagogical School. In 1993, the school was merged with the Military Technical School under the name Military Academy in Liptovský Mikuláš.

== Academics ==
The academy was one of the few schools whose graduates received the title of Doctor of Social and Political Sciences. Graduates worked as political instructors, supervisory officers responsible for the political education (ideology) of the units on behalf of the Communist Party of Czechoslovakia.

== Heads ==
- Ludvík Svoboda (1955–1958)
- Jozef Belas (May 1971-1972)
- Brigadier General Jiří Reindl (1972-1989)

== Notable alumni ==
- Marcel Chládek, Minister of Education of the Czech Republic from 2014-2015.
- Eva Pavlová, First Lady of the Czech Republic
- František Kašický, former Minister of Defense of the Slovak Republic.
- Milan Feranec, Member of the Chamber of Deputies of the Czech Republic from 2017-2025.
- Lenka Smerdova, the first female Brigadier general in the Czech Army.

== See also ==
- Lenin Military-Political Academy
