= Pleva =

Pleva (feminine: Plevová) is a Czech and Slovak surname, meaning 'chaff' (waste from grain cleaning). It could have been a name used to designate an agricultural worker. Notable people with the surname include:

- Dalibor Pleva (born 1984), Slovak footballer
- Josef Věromír Pleva (1899–1985), Czech writer

== See also ==
- Zadina, a surname with the same meaning
