= Olga Havlová =

Former First Lady of the Czech Republic

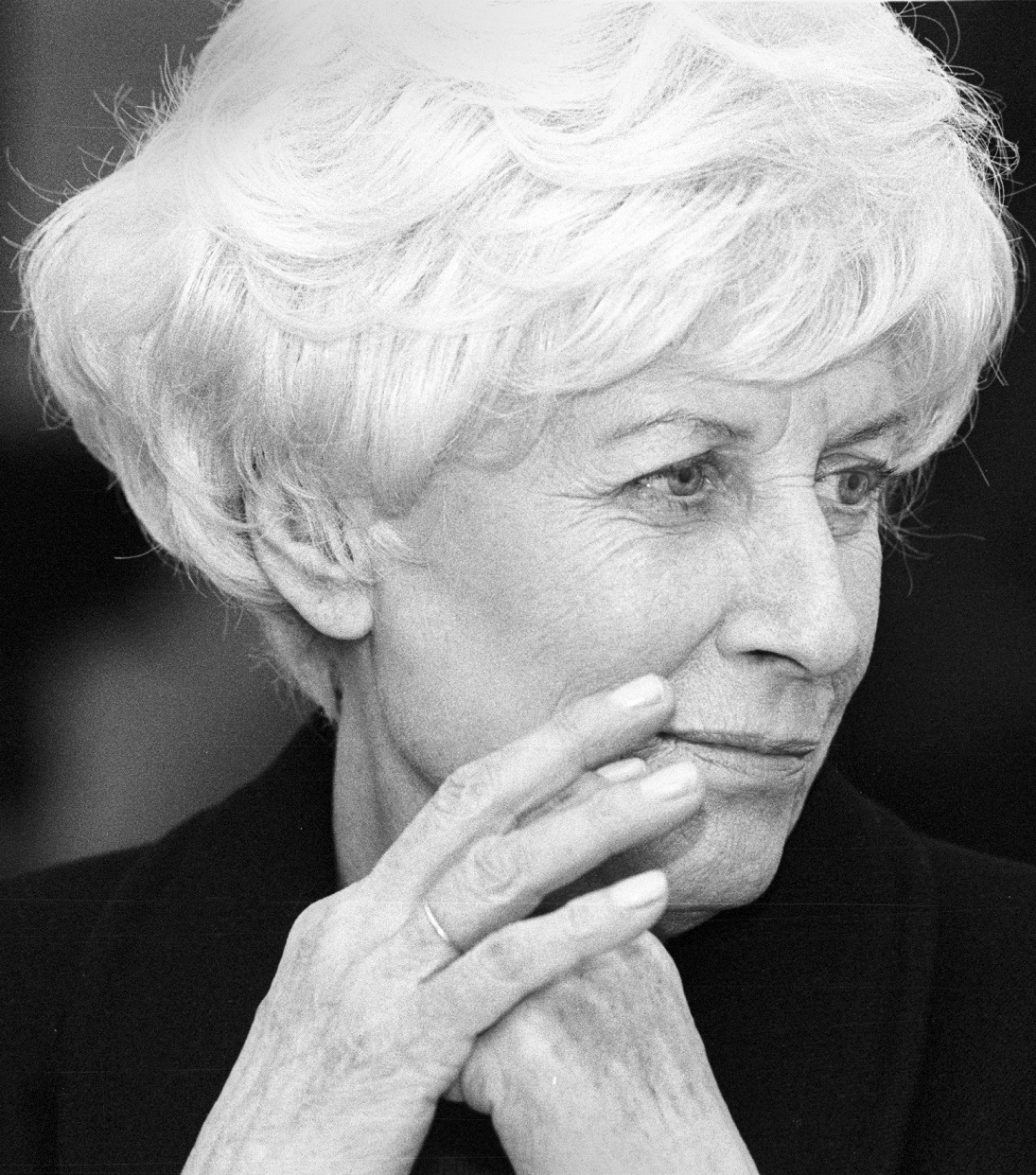

First Lady of the Czech Republic
- In role 2 February 1993 – 27 January 1996
- President: Václav Havel
- Preceded by: Position established
- Succeeded by: Dagmar Havlová

First Lady of Czechoslovakia
- In role 29 December 1989 – 20 July 1992
- President: Václav Havel
- Preceded by: Viera Husáková
- Succeeded by: Position abolished

Personal details
- Born: Olga Šplíchalová; 11 July 1933 Žižkov, Prague, Czechoslovakia
- Died: 27 January 1996 (aged 62) Prague, Czech Republic
- Resting place: Vinohrady Cemetery, Prague
- Spouse: Václav Havel (1964–1996; her death)

Olga Havlová (nee Šplíchalová; 11 July 1933 – 27 January 1996) was a Czech dissident, activist, and the first wife of Václav Havel, the last President of Czechoslovakia and first President of the Czech Republic. Havlová, the inaugural First Lady of the Czech Republic and final First Lady of Czechoslovakia, was the founder of the Committee of Good Will and a signatory of Charter 77.

== Early life ==
Olga Havel was born in Žižkov, "one of the roughest, working-class districts of Prague", in a working-class family. She spent her childhood in a way typical for such a harsh environment. Her parents split up when she was six years old. In a large family, also including Olga's older sister Jaroslava's family (a single mother of five children), any free hand was useful. Therefore, it was obvious that Olga cared for her young nieces and nephews since her childhood. As a child, she also attended Milíčův dům (Milíč House in Prague) established by Přemysl Pitter. Olga used to spend a lot of time in libraries where she acquired her strong lifelong love of literature. Although her family's life was modest, Olga's mother used to take her children to cinema and theatre quite often. After graduation from secondary school, Olga became a trainee in the Tomáš Baťa factory, where she also worked afterward. In the course of working on a sewing machine, she lost four fingers on her left hand.

When she was about twenty, she was an enthusiastic theatre lover and attended the drama classes of Professor Lydie Wegener. Together with her other pupils, she acted in an amateur theatre performance in Divadlo Na slupi (which no longer exists). During the 1950s, she worked as an accountant, a store keeper, and sales assistant.

Olga first met Václav Havel at the Prague writers' hangout Café Slavia in the early 1950s and married him in 1964. During the 1960s, her husband became a respected author both at home and in Europe. In the second half of the 1960s, as a writer and a contributor to the cultural magazines, he was involved in a democratization process, particularly in the field of culture. He advocated freedom of speech, independence of culture, return of full-fledged civil rights. During the years 1961–67, Olga Havel worked at the theatre Divadlo Na zábradlí (Theatre on the Balustrade) where her husband was also active until 1968. Václav Havel made no secret of the fact that, despite the diversity of personalities and family environment as well as all the usual problems of life and crises, Olga meant a lot to him. He appreciated how quickly this seemingly ordinary young woman from Žižkov became a part of the Prague intellectual environment of the 1950s and '60s, that she was an attentive first reader and critic of his essays and dramatic works, a valuable supporter and collaborator in the difficult years of Charter 77, as well as a lifelong partner.

In 1967, the Havels bought a country estate in the foothills called Hrádeček. Later on, when Václav Havel was gradually losing not only a possibility to find a job but also some contacts and friends in Prague, the couple moved to their cottage and practically lived there until November 1989. Olga Havel, a passionate mushroom-picker and nature-lover, fell in love with the place just as her husband did. She was fond of gardening and taking her dogs for long walks to the forest. They alternated moments of peace and seclusion used by Václav for his work with a rich social life, of which they were hospitable organizers.

== As a Czechoslovak dissident ==
Following the Warsaw Pact invasion of Czechoslovakia in August 1968 until the Velvet Revolution in 1989, Václav Havel could not publish openly in his home country. Theatres were not allowed to stage his plays and he was gradually pushed out of the public cultural activities and became one of the most prominent dissidents. As a fighter against continuously intensified totalitarian regime, he was persecuted by the secret police (Státní bezpečnost), he was often detained, interrogated and imprisoned. Olga Havel was always an important back up to her husband; she supported him in all his dissident activities and she was also involved in them. She was described as "full of forthright, even earthy common sense. A shrewd, intuitive judge of people, calm but tough, and with a natural dignity". After he was sentenced to four and a half years of imprisonment, Olga Havel together with her brother-in-law Ivan Havel took over responsibilities and obligations in samizdat Edition Expedition, which was led by Václav before. In relation to the prosecution for transporting prohibited printed material, she was accused of subversion of the republic in the case of "Karavan". Her prosecution was abolished after the fall of the Communist government.

Olga Havel was the addressee of the intellectually deep, philosophically and existentially toned letters sent by Václav Havel during the years 1979 – 1983 from prison. Some of them were intended not only for her but also for the philosophically minded circle of friends with whom he - through the letters - tried to think through different things and they tried to help him stay intellectually active. Letters to Olga, (Dopisy Olze) a selection of these letters, forms one of the most important books of Václav Havel, was first published in 1983 in the Edition Expedition. Olga also organized meetings, distributed manuscripts and participated in the Charter 77 activities. She signed Charter 77 in 1982.

In the difficult years of insecurity, persecution and imprisonment of her husband, Olga fully and with joy used the opportunity to escape from the difficulties of everyday life by joining Hrobka (Tomb), the circle of friends organizing various humorous activities. Václav Havel characterized this circle accurately: "In the early 1980s, I was – like several of my friends - imprisoned, conditions outside were harsh and so Hrobka was created as a way of self-defence; it was a cheerful community of imprisoned dissidents' wives, those who remained at large and their friends." Olga soon became one of the organizers of a diverse range of cultural and social activities and thus she returned to her creative interests from the years of amateur theatre. She added to the community life not only as a regular hostess of costumed garden parties at Hrádeček on her birthdays but, first of all, she herself came up with many ideas and inspiration.

In 1987, Olga co-founded Originální Videojournal, the samizdat video news magazine which documented the activities of dissent in pictures and informed about the present political and cultural situation in Czechoslovakia openly. She actively worked in the magazine and focused mainly on ecological topics. In late 1985, she initiated a magazine O divadle (About Theatre), and as a member of the editorial staff she helped mainly with economic and production issues.

== After November 1989 ==
=== Committee of Good Will – Olga Havel Foundation ===
As the wife of the first Czechoslovak democratic president after February 1948, Olga Havel intensively focused on charitable activities. In the era of newly emerging democracy, she was a pioneer of charity in the country. In early 1990, she and her friends from Charter 77 founded the Committee of Good Will, one of the first projects of this kind in Czechoslovakia. In 1992, she founded the Olga Havel Foundation and members of the Committee of Good Will became board members of the foundation with Olga as the chair. The main objective of the Committee of Good Will - Olga Havel Foundation (OHF) was to help people with disabilities, abandoned or discriminated against, with their integration into society. The Foundation activities soon became well known abroad. In some countries in Europe and overseas, sister organizations were established to support the main goals of the Foundation.

Olga Havel visited emerging centres for children with multiple disabilities to inquire what could make their life easier. She was often seen among senior citizens and children with disabilities. She was interested in transformation of hospitals into nonprofit, non-governmental organizations and urged ministers to support civil society organizations working in the social field. She earned respect of world politicians and cultural figures. She met outstanding personalities in and outside Europe; together with Christiane Herzog, wife of German President, she organized help for children with cystic fibrosis.

=== Olga Havel Award ===
On the fifth anniversary of the establishment of the OHF, Olga decided to present an award to a person with a disability who helped to improve living conditions of other disabled people. This prize is awarded annually in May. Olga attended just the first awards ceremony - she died in January 1996. The prize, a statue called Encouragement by Olbram Zoubek, thus also became a remembrance of a person who had always been an advocate for the rights of vulnerable citizens. One part of the Olga Havel Award project is to promote civic associations providing social and medical services in a dignified way, and using new forms of social services. For the OHF, the ceremony is also an opportunity to pay tribute to its significant donors and collaborators.

=== Last years and death ===
In 1991, Nordic foundation Stiftelsen Arets Budeje awarded Olga Havel the prestigious prize Woman of the Year 1991. In 1995, she received the Přemysl Pitter medal and became Woman of the Year 1995 in the Czech Republic. Olga Havel dedicated the last years of her life to tireless building of civil society. In 1995, Olga was according to the public survey the most significant woman of the Czech Republic and she became an authority even abroad. Thanks to her the issue of handicapped people stopped being an "indecent topic".

Olga Havel died of cancer on 27 January 1996. Her death deeply hit the entire nation. People stood in a long queue to honour her, laid flowers in the chapel at the south wing of Prague Castle, and signed a condolence book. She is buried in the Havel family tomb at Prague's Vinohrady Cemetery.

In 1997, Olga Havel was in memoriam awarded the Order of Tomáš Garrigue Masaryk for outstanding contribution to democracy and human rights. Since 1996, based on approval of the President Václav Havel, secondary school in Ostrava-Poruba carries an honorary title – Olga Havel Gymnázium. In 2014, Business Academy, specialized school and practical school in Janské Lázně, which Olga Havel opened in 1994, was officially named after her.

Olga Havel left neither letters nor a book of memories. Books by Pavel Kosatík or Marta Marková, the tribute anthology Síla věcnosti (Power of factuality) describe her life. In 1993, the documentary was made within the cycle GEN – Galery of the nation's elite, in 2006 – on the occasion of 10th anniversary of her death – a documentary Paní Olga (Lady Olga) from the cycle Příběhy slavných (Stories of the famous). In 2014, director Miroslav Janek made the documentary OLGA, which was awarded in the category Best Documentary on the 22nd film awards Český lev (Czech Lion). In 2010, a commemorative plaque was unveiled at the building where the Committee of Good Will is located (Prague, Senovážné náměstí 2); since 2012, a new street in Žižkov-Vackov bears the name of Olga Havel.

== See also ==
- Letters to Olga

== References and notes ==
Honorary titles
Vacant Title last held by Viera Husáková-Čáslavská	First Lady of Czechoslovakia; 1989–1992	Title abolished
New title	First Lady of the Czech Republic; 1993–1996	Vacant Title next held by Dagmar Havlová
