= Veselíčko =

Veselíčko may refer to places in the Czech Republic:

- Veselíčko (Písek District), a municipality and village in the South Bohemian Region
- Veselíčko (Přerov District), a municipality and village in the Olomouc Region
- Veselíčko, a village and part of Luká in the Olomouc Region
- Veselíčko (Žďár nad Sázavou), a village and part of Žďár nad Sázavou in the Vysočina Region
