= Dagmar Havlová =

Czech actress (born 1953)

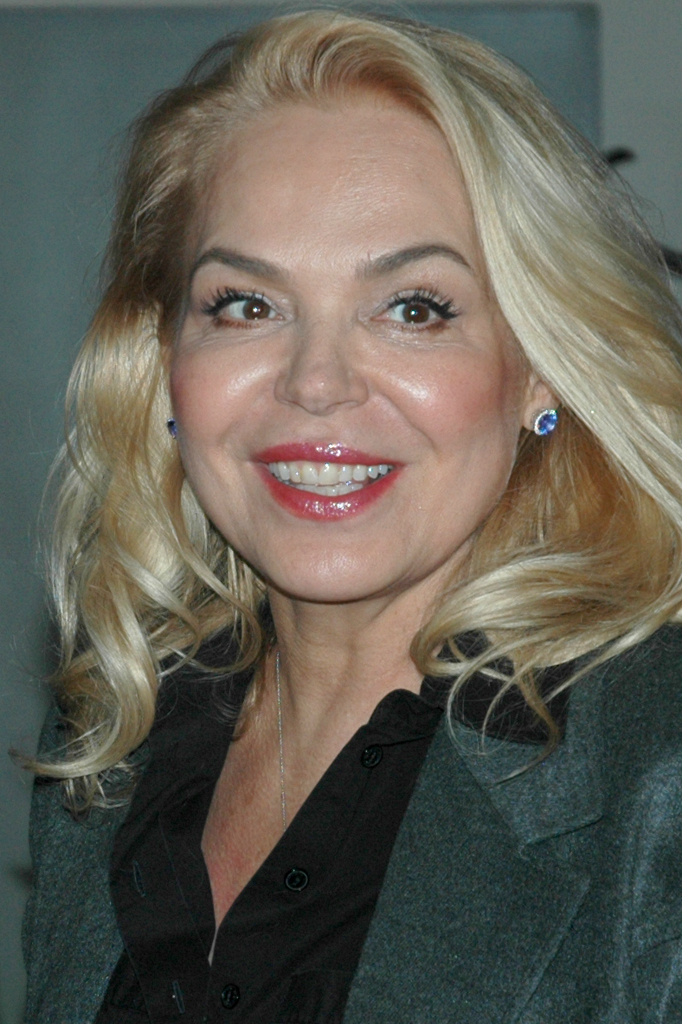
- Havlová in 2013

First Lady of the Czech Republic
- In role 4 January 1997 – 2 February 2003
- President: Václav Havel
- Preceded by: Olga Havlová
- Succeeded by: Livia Klausová

Personal details
- Born: Dagmar Veškrnová; 22 March 1953 (age 73) Brno, Czechoslovakia
- Spouse(s): Radvít Novák (m. 1975; div. 1980) Václav Havel (m. 1997; died 2011)
- Education: Brno Conservatory; Janáček Academy of Music and Performing Arts
- Occupation: Actress

Dagmar Havlová (née Veškrnová; 22 March 1953) is a Czech actress and former First Lady of the Czech Republic. She has appeared in over 50 films and made hundreds of television appearances. She became First Lady upon marrying Václav Havel, the former Czech President, on 4 January 1997.

== Early life ==
Havlová was born to Markéta Veškrnová and harmonist Karel Veškrna on 22 March 1953 in Brno. She graduated from the Brno Conservatory in 1971. In 1975, she graduated with the title of "Magister artis" (equivalent to Master of Fine Arts) from the Janáček Academy of Musical Arts. In 1976 she married her first husband Radvít Novák, with whom she has a daughter, Nina. The marriage lasted five years.

== Acting career ==
She made her debut on film in the 1974 Juraj Herz film Girls from the Crockery Shop. She made over 50 film appearances by 1996, as well as almost 200 appearances on television. In 2011 she was part of the cast in her husband Václav Havel's directorial debut Leaving, based on his play of the same name. In 2014 Havlová was named Best Actress, as well as the overall winner, of the TýTý television awards.

== First Lady of the Czech Republic ==
In 1997 she became First Lady of the Czech Republic after she married Czech President Václav Havel, less than a year after his first wife Olga had died. The ceremony, which was held on 4 January, took place in Žižkov town hall in Prague 3 and was only attended by two witnesses plus Havlová's daughter from her first marriage, Nina. The couple remained together until Havel's death in December 2011.

== See also ==
- Václav Havel
- Barrandov Terraces
- Dagmar (novel)

Honorary titles
Vacant Title last held by Olga Havlová	First Lady of the Czech Republic; 1997–2003	Succeeded by Livia Klausová
