= Svratka (Žďár nad Sázavou District) =

- Town
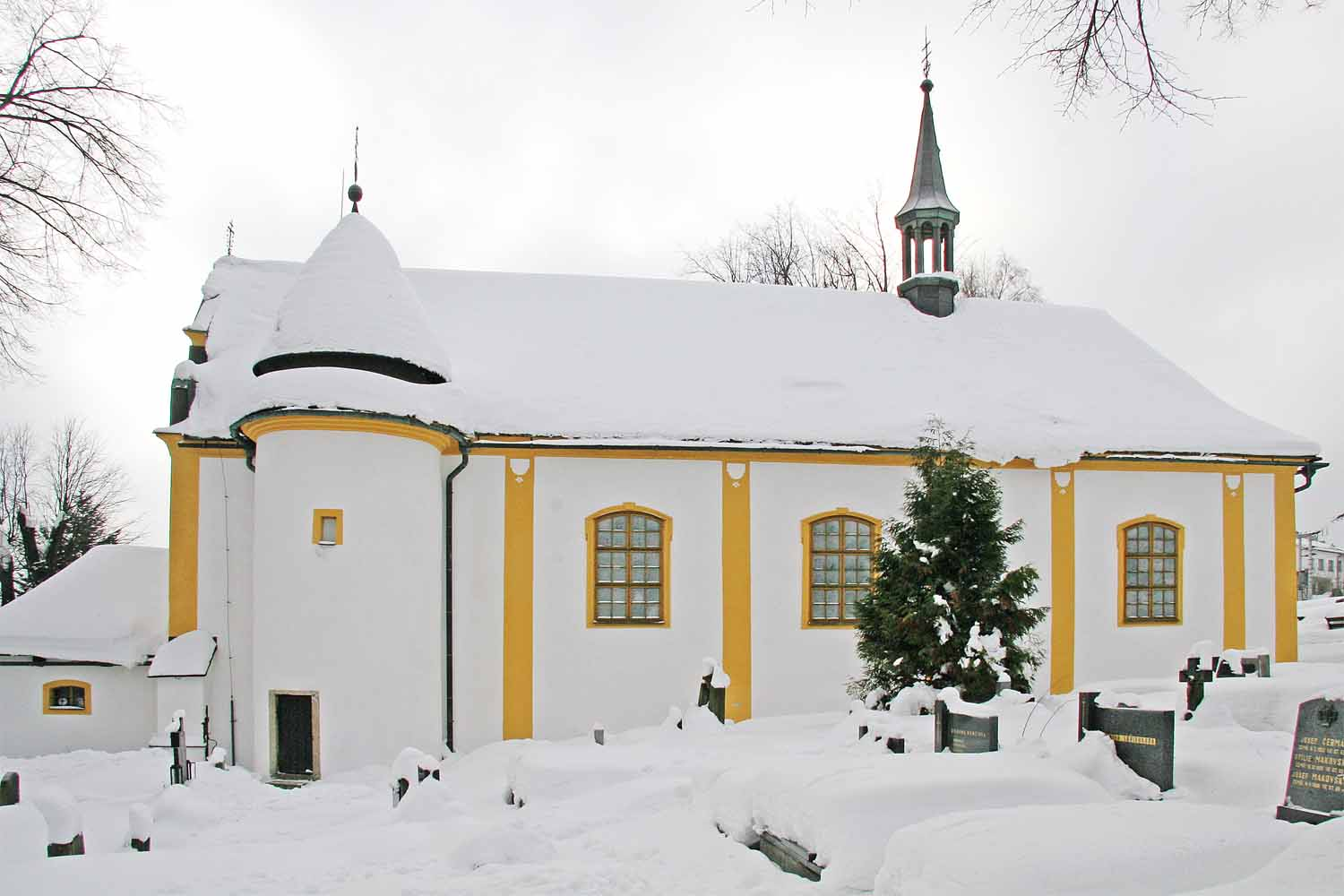
- Church of Saint John the Baptist

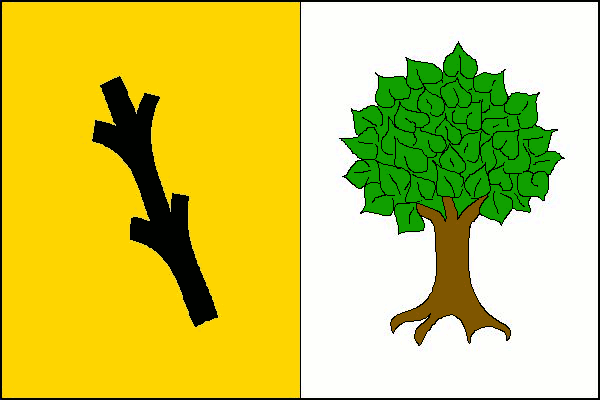
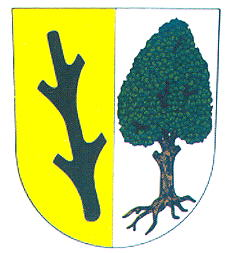
- Flag Coat of arms

- Location in the Czech Republic
- Coordinates: 49°42′39″N 16°1′56″E
- Country: Czech Republic
- Region: Vysočina
- District: Žďár nad Sázavou
- First mentioned: 1350

Government
  - Mayor: František Mládek

Area
  - Total: 14.51 km^{2} (5.60 sq mi)
- Elevation: 632 m (2,073 ft)

Population (2026-01-01)
  - Total: 1,358
  - Density: 93.59/km^{2} (242.4/sq mi)
- Time zone: UTC+1 (CET)
  - Summer (DST): UTC+2 (CEST)
- Postal code: 592 02
- Website: www.svratka.cz

Svratka (Czech pronunciation: [ˈsvratka]) is a town in Žďár nad Sázavou District in the Vysočina Region of the Czech Republic. It has about 1,400 inhabitants. The town is located on the Svratka River, on the border between the Upper Svratka Highlands and Iron Mountains.

== Administrative division ==
Svratka consists of four municipal parts (in brackets population according to the 2021 census):

- Svratka (1,102)
- Česká Cikánka (60)
- Moravská Cikánka (16)
- Moravská Svratka (151)

== Etymology ==
The town was named after the Svratka River.

== Geography ==
Svratka is located about 17 kilometres (11 mi) northeast of Žďár nad Sázavou and 46 km (29 mi) northeast of Jihlava. It lies on the border between the Upper Svratka Highlands and Iron Mountains. The highest point is 778 m (2,552 ft) above sea level. The Svratka River flows through the town, forming the historical border between Bohemia and Moravia. The town lies within the Žďárské vrchy Protected Landscape Area.

== History ==
The first written mention of Svratka is from 1350. Important noble families took turns in ownership of Svratka: the Lords of Pardubice, the Poděbrady family, the Berka of Dubá family, the Kinsky family and the Thurn und Taxis family.

The 19th century saw industry development, culminating in 1867 with the promotion of Svratka to a town. There was a paper mill and a match factory.

== Demographics ==
Historical population

Year	Pop.	±%
1869	1,762	—
1880	1,777	+0.9%
1890	1,883	+6.0%
1900	1,839	−2.3%
1910	1,933	+5.1%

Year	Pop.	±%
1921	1,759	−9.0%
1930	2,126	+20.9%
1950	1,516	−28.7%
1961	1,638	+8.0%
1970	1,612	−1.6%

Year	Pop.	±%
1980	1,666	+3.3%
1991	1,675	+0.5%
2001	1,592	−5.0%
2011	1,407	−11.6%
2021	1,329	−5.5%

Source: Censuses

== Transport ==
No railways or major roads are passing through the municipality.

== Sights ==
The most valuable monument is the Church of Saint John the Baptist. It has an early Gothic core. Its separate bell tower dates from around 1600.

== Notable people ==
- Josef Věromír Pleva (1899–1985), writer
