= Ivana Zemanová =

First Lady of the Czech Republic (2013–2023)

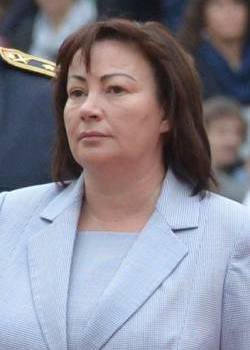

First Lady of the Czech Republic
- In role 8 March 2013 – 8 March 2023
- President: Miloš Zeman
- Preceded by: Livia Klausová
- Succeeded by: Eva Pavlová

Spouse of the Prime Minister of the Czech Republic
- In role 17 July 1998 – 15 July 2002
- Prime Minister: Miloš Zeman
- Preceded by: Bohdana Tošovská
- Succeeded by: Viktorie Špidlová

Personal details
- Born: 29 April 1965 (age 61) Nové Město na Moravě, Czechoslovakia
- Party: Social Democratic Party (1993–2003)
- Spouse: Miloš Zeman (m. 1993)
- Children: Kateřina Zemanová
- Education: Masaryk University
- Occupation: Economist

Ivana Zemanová (née Bednarčíková; born 29 April 1965) is the former First Lady of the Czech Republic and wife of the 3rd President of the Czech Republic Miloš Zeman.

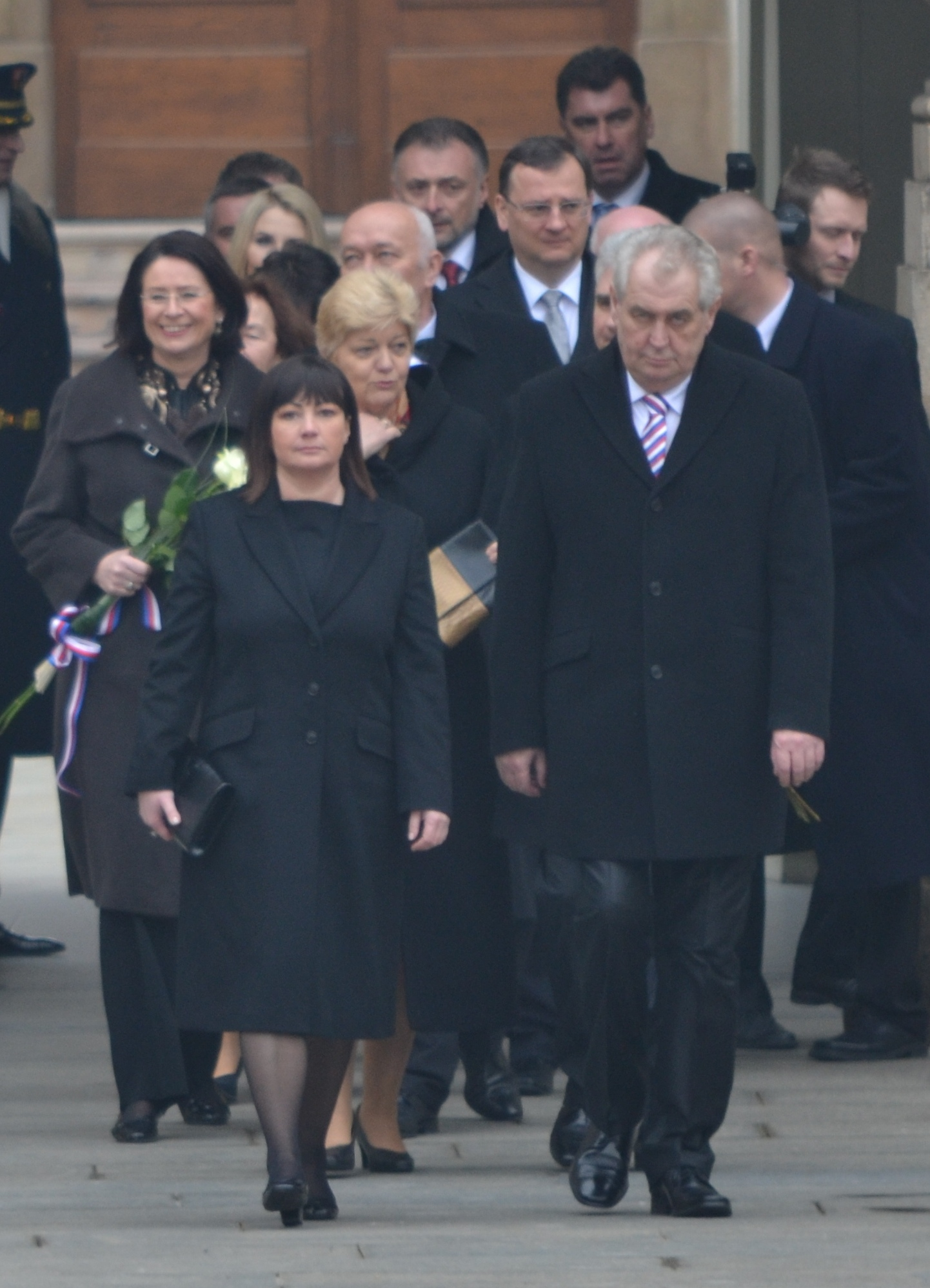
Ivana Zemanová and Miloš Zeman at presidential inauguration (8 March 2013)

== Early life and education ==
Zemanová is of mixed Czech-Slovak origin. Her father, the Slovak Pavel Bednarčík, was a political prisoner. While studying at a gymnasium in Poprad, he was arrested and, together with several other students, charged with high treason. In 1949 the court sentenced him to three years of imprisonment, and he was sent to perform forced labour in the uranium mines in Jáchymov. After his release, he settled in Dolní Rožínka. In Bystřice nad Pernštejnem he met Anastázie Plánková, a Czech woman who worked as a clerk at the post office. The couple had a son, Petr, in 1961 and a daughter, Ivana, in 1965. Pavel Bednarčík died in 1968 and Ivana's mother never remarried.

From 1979 to 1983 Zemanová attended the gymnasium in Bystřice nad Pernštejnem. After graduating, in 1983 she began studying at the Faculty of Arts of Masaryk University in Brno, where she majored in Romance studies.

== Career and marriage ==
In 1990, Zemanová met Miloš Zeman, then a researcher at the Prognostic Institute of the Czechoslovak Academy of Sciences and a member of parliament, after noticing a public remark of his that he was without a secretary. She interrupted her studies—despite having already begun work on her thesis—and from the autumn of 1990 worked as Zeman's assistant at the Prognostic Institute. Their professional relationship developed into a personal one, and after she became pregnant she married Zeman, who had previously been divorced and was twenty years her senior. The wedding took place on 2 August 1993 at the New Town Hall in Prague. Their daughter Kateřina was born on 1 January 1994.

After Zeman stepped down as Prime Minister of the Czech Republic and retired from politics in 2002, the couple's marriage became largely formal, and they began to live apart. Miloš Zeman resided in Nové Veselí in the Vysočina Region, while Zemanová and their daughter lived in an apartment in the Stodůlky district of Prague.

In 2001 and 2002 she handled promotion and sponsorship for the "Czech Cultural Season in France 2002" project organised by the Ministry of Culture. In 2010 she worked as head of the sales department for Mold Vin CZ, a Moldovan wine importer owned by her husband's friend Zdeněk Zbytek. From April 2011 to April 2012 she served as a producer in the cultural department of the Prague Castle Administration.

Zemanová held the role of First Lady of the Czech Republic from 8 March 2013 to 8 March 2023. She speaks Russian and French.

== Public activity ==
Zemanová appears only rarely at official occasions and is known for guarding her privacy. Following her husband's unsuccessful first bid to return to high political office in the 2003 Czech presidential election, she expressed her disappointment by leaving the Social Democrats and withdrawing from public life.

In contrast to her daughter Kateřina, Zemanová did not take part in her husband's campaign in the 2013 Czech presidential election. She gave her first short interview of the campaign only shortly before the second round of the direct vote.

Honorary titles
Preceded by Livia Klausová	First Lady of the Czech Republic; 2013–2023	Succeeded by Eva Pavlová
