= Slavkovice =

- Village
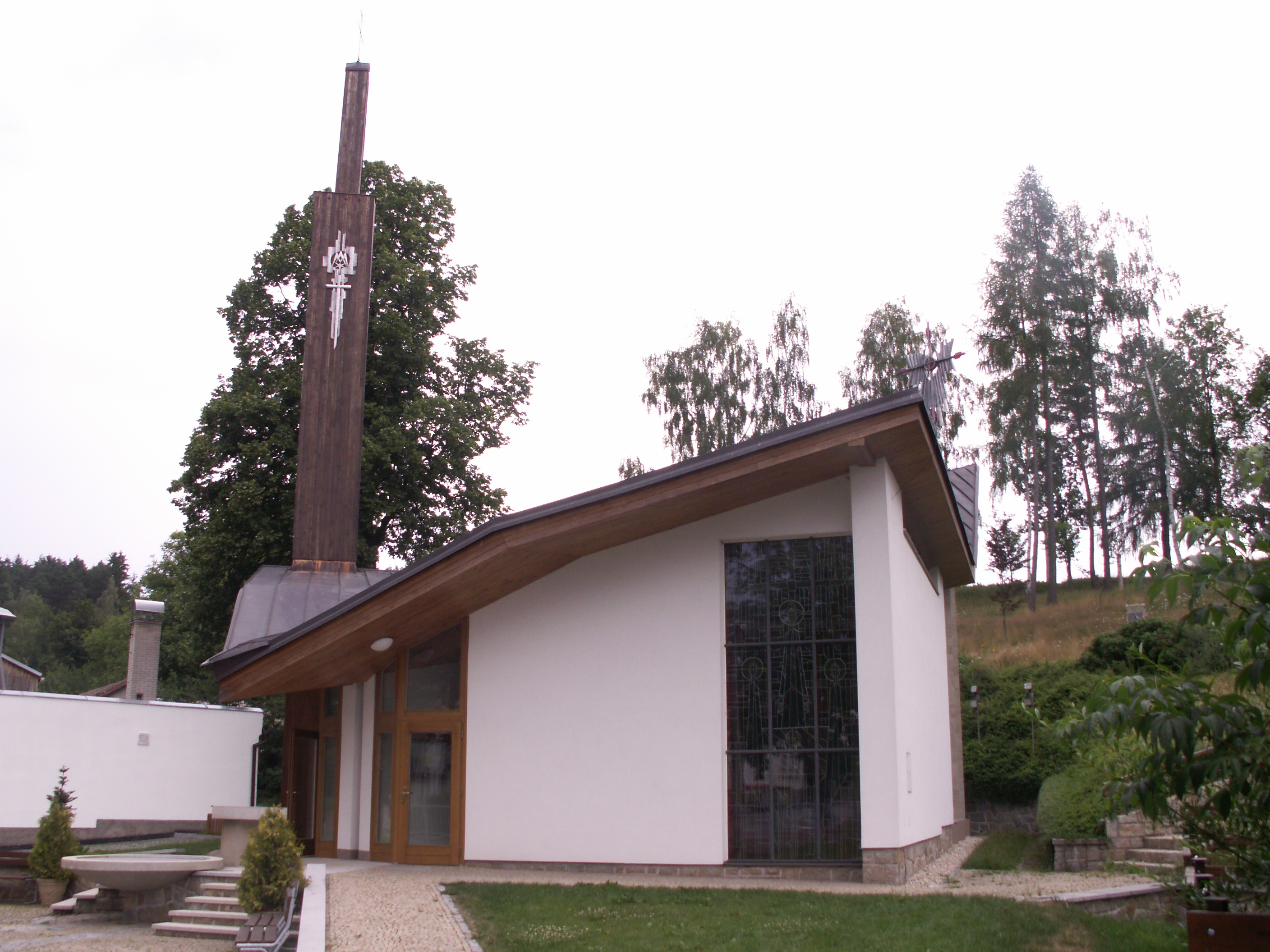
- Church of the Divine Mercy and Saint Faustina

- Location in the Czech Republic
- Coordinates: 49°33′9″N 16°1′47″E
- Country: Czech Republic
- Region: Vysočina
- District: Žďár nad Sázavou
- Municipality: Nové Město na Moravě
- First mentioned: 1264

Area
  - Total: 4.84 km^{2} (1.87 sq mi)
- Elevation: 576 m (1,890 ft)

Population (2021)
  - Total: 431
  - Density: 89.0/km^{2} (231/sq mi)
- Time zone: UTC+1 (CET)
  - Summer (DST): UTC+2 (CEST)
- Postal code: 592 31
- Website: www.slavkovice-nmnm.cz

Slavkovice (German: Slawkowitz) is a village and municipal part of Nové Město na Moravě in Žďár nad Sázavou District in the Vysočina Region of the Czech Republic. It has about 400 inhabitants.

== Geography ==
Slavkovice is located in the western part of the territory of Nové Město na Moravě, about 6 kilometres (4 mi) east of Žďár nad Sázavou and 56 km (35 mi) northwest of Brno.

The stream Slavkovický potok flows through the village. In the centre of the village, the fishpond Velký rybník is built on the stream.

== History ==
The first written mention of Slavkovice dates back to 1264, when the burgrave Bohuslav of Lichtenburg bequeathed the village to Žďár Monastery upon his death.

In 1830, a local village school was established in house No. 5. A dedicated school building was constructed in 1838.

From 1850 to 1905, Veselíčko (now part of Žďár nad Sázavou) was a municipal part of Slavkovice and shared its school.

Between 1966 and 1970, uranium ore was mined near the village.

Since 1980, Slavkovice has been a municipal part of Nové Město na Moravě.

== Demographics ==
Historical population

Year	Pop.	±%
1869	465	—
1880	406	−12.7%
1890	430	+5.9%
1900	404	−6.0%
1910	396	−2.0%

Year	Pop.	±%
1921	345	−12.9%
1930	337	−2.3%
1950	326	−3.3%
1961	337	+3.4%
1970	326	−3.3%

Year	Pop.	±%
1980	357	+9.5%
1991	374	+4.8%
2001	412	+10.2%
2011	424	+2.9%
2021	431	+1.7%

Source: Censuses

== Sights ==
There are no protected cultural monuments in Slavkovice.

In 2005–2007, the Church of the Divine Mercy and Saint Faustina was built.
