= Livia Klausová =

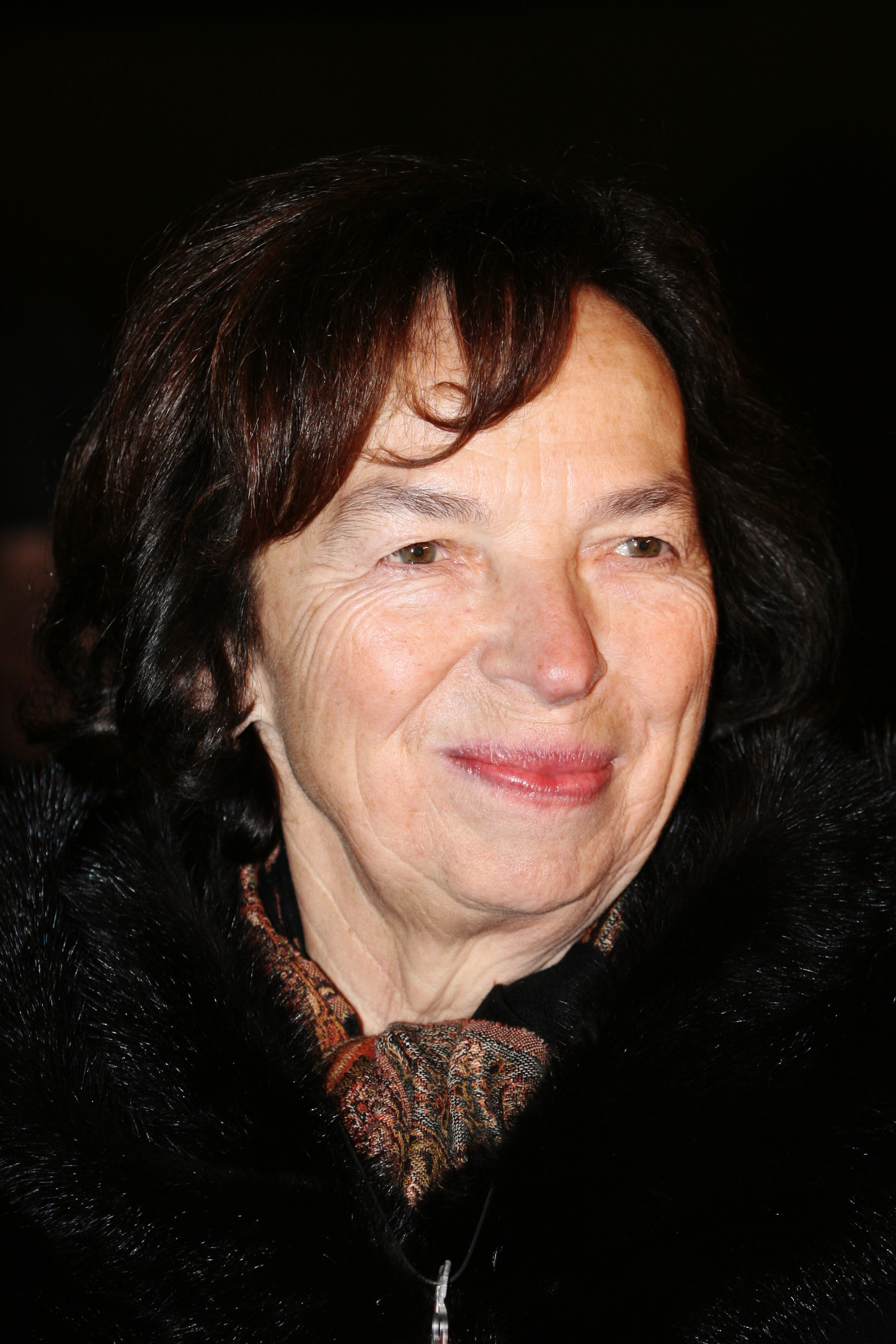

First Lady of the Czech Republic
- In role 7 March 2003 – 7 March 2013
- President: Václav Klaus
- Preceded by: Dagmar Havlová
- Succeeded by: Ivana Zemanová

Czech Republic Ambassador to Slovakia
- In office 16 December 2013 – 30 April 2018
- President: Miloš Zeman
- Preceded by: Jakub Karfík
- Succeeded by: Tomáš Tuhý

Personal details
- Born: 10 November 1943 (age 82) Bratislava, Slovak Republic (now Slovakia)
- Spouse: Václav Klaus (m. 1968)
- Occupation: Economist

Livia Klausová (née Mištinová, born 10 November 1943) is a Slovak-born Czech economist who was the First Lady of the Czech Republic from 2003 to 2013 as wife of the President Václav Klaus. From 2013 to 2018 she served as the Czech Republic's ambassador to Slovakia.

An alumna of the University of Economics, Prague, she married fellow economist Václav Klaus in 1968. The couple have two sons, Václav (b. 1969) and Jan (b. 1974), and five grandchildren. Her father was Štefan Miština, who died in 1959.

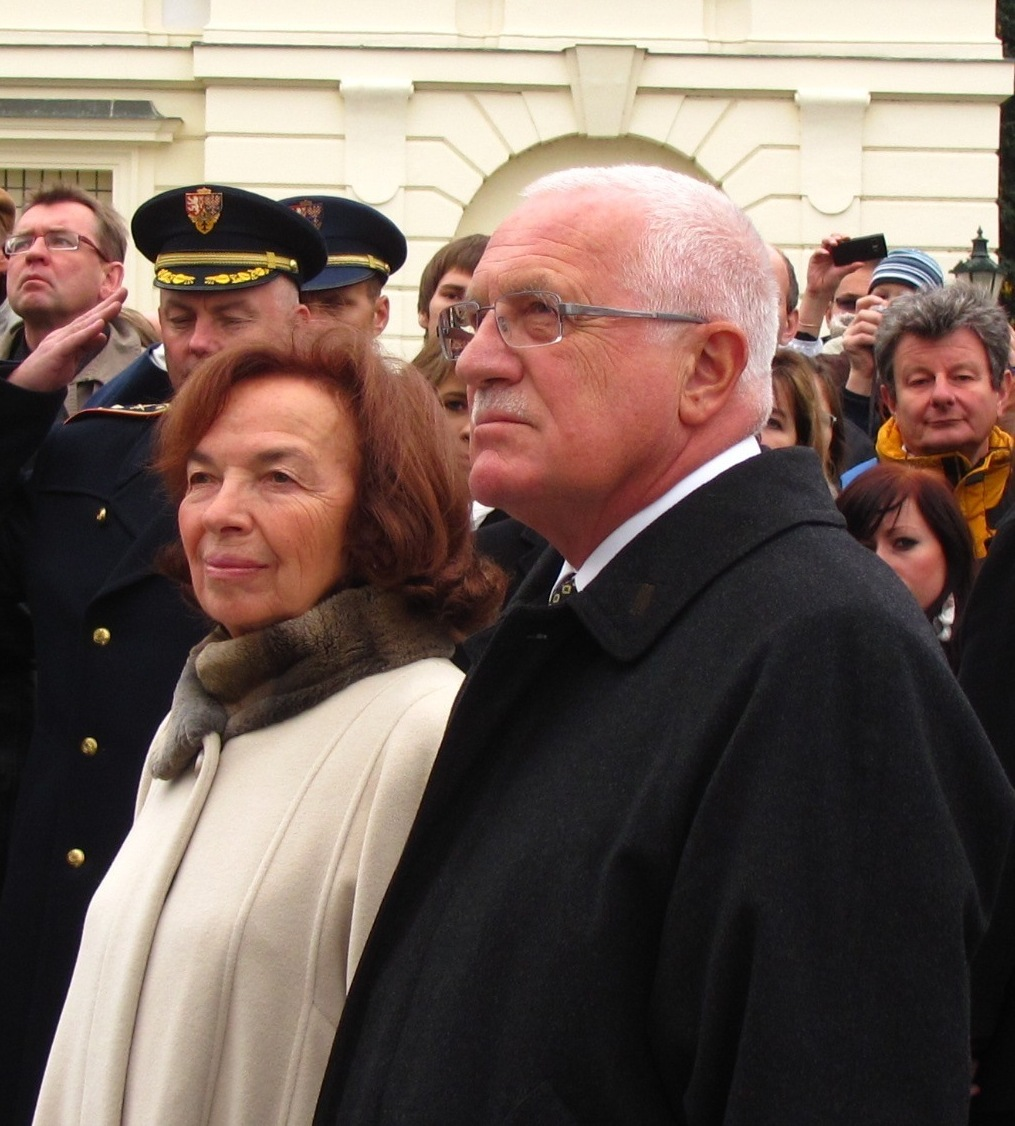
Livia Klausová and Václav Klaus (2011)

== Member of Supervisory Boards ==
Company / organization	Field	Start date	Finish date	Highest position held
Česká spořitelna, a. s.	Finance and insurance		2003	
ČEZ, a.s.	Energy			
ZVVZ Milevsko	Manufacturing		2003	

== Sources ==
- Biography of Václav Klaus from Radio Praha

Honorary titles
Preceded by Dagmar Havlová	First Lady of the Czech Republic; 2003–2013	Succeeded by Ivana Zemanová
