= Letters to Olga =

Book by Václav Havel

- Author: Václav Havel
- Original title: Dopisy Olze
- Language: Czech
- Publication date: 1989
- ISBN: 0-8050-0973-6

Letters to Olga (Czech:Dopisy Olze) is a book compiled from letters written by Czech playwright, dissident, and future president, Václav Havel to his wife Olga Havlová during his nearly four-year imprisonment from May 1979 to March 1983. (Havel was released when he came down with a high fever and received a medical discharge.) Havel was imprisoned by the communist government of then Czechoslovakia for being one of the leaders of The Committee for the Defense of the Unjustly Prosecuted (VONS) – most of whom had been signatories of the human rights document Charter 77.

Author Salman Rushdie stated in a 1999 interview, that Letters to Olga was among a small handful of books that he carried with him living in secret locations during the years he was hiding from possible execution.

== See also ==
- Olga Havlová
