= Milan Feranec =

Czech politician (1964–2025)

Milan Feranec MP

Member of the Chamber of Deputies of the Czech Republic
- In office 21 October 2017 – 10 January 2025

Deputy Minister of Transport of the Czech Republic
- In office 1 February 2014 – 16 November 2017

Member of the City Council of Olomouc
- In office 11 October 2014 – 10 January 2025

Personal details
- Born: 18 January 1964 Snina, Czechoslovakia
- Died: 10 January 2025 (aged 60) Czech Republic
- Party: KSČ; ANO (2014–2025)
- Education: Vojenská politická akademie Klementa Gottwalda; Masaryk University
- Occupation: Politician, lawyer

Milan Feranec (18 January 1964 – 10 January 2025) was a Czech politician and lawyer who served as an MP, deputy minister, and member of the city council of Olomouc as a member of ANO.

== Early life and education ==
Feranec was born on 18 January 1964. He attended the Klement Gottwald Military Political Academy in Bratislava from 1983 to 1987. During this time, he joined the Communist Party of Czechoslovakia. He then studied at the Faculty of Law of Masaryk University in Brno, from 1990 to 1995.

== Career ==
From 2002 to 2009, he worked as a manager of ownership interests for Agrofert Holding. In 2010 he worked for ZZN Pomoraví, and from 2011 to 2012, he worked for AGRO Jevišovice. He then began his own business. On 19 June 2014, he became Chairman of the Supervisory Board for České dráhy. He was dismissed in July 2018. He was a member of the city council of Olomouc from 2014 to 2025, being reelected in 2018 and 2022. In 2014, he was appointed as the first deputy to the Minister of Transport, Antonín Prachař. He resigned in 2017, when he was elected as an MP, as the two positions are not compatible. He was a member of the Chamber of Deputies from 21 October 2017 until his death in 2025 as a member of ANO.

== Personal life and death ==
He was married to Miroslava Ferancová, a fellow ANO politician.

He was diagnosed with a kidney tumor that was initially successfully treated. However, it reappeared and he died from kidney cancer on 10 January 2025, at the age of 60. He was replaced as MP by Bohuslav Hudec.
