= Josef Věromír Pleva =

Czech writer (1899–1985)

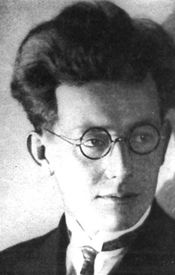
- Young Pleva
- Born: Josef Pleva; 12 August 1899; Moravská Svratka, Moravia, Austria-Hungary
- Died: 7 September 1985 (aged 86); Brno, Czechoslovakia
- Occupation: Writer
- Writing career
- Genre: Children's literature
- Notable work: Malý Bobeš

Josef Věromír Pleva (12 August 1899 – 7 September 1985) was a Czech writer of books for children. He is best known for Malý Bobeš, a book that belongs to the most important books of Czech children's literature.

== Life ==
Pleva was born in Moravská Svratka in Austria-Hungary (today part of Svratka in the Czech Republic). He was born as the eldest of eight children into an evangelical family. His father was a railway worker and the family moved frequently. Pleva trained as a bookbinder and briefly worked as a bookbinder in Frenštát pod Radhoštěm, Nové Město na Moravě and Moravské Budějovice. In 1920–1924, he studied teaching in Čáslav and subsequently became a teacher. He taught in Ječovice, Černouček and various places in the Vysočina Region.

In 1926, he became a member of the Communist Party of Czechoslovakia. Together with his friends, he founded the Group of Literary and Art Workers in 1928. It was supposed to be the opposition to Devětsil. The group ended its activities in 1930, and after he became teacher in Brno in the same year, Pleva turned to writing children's books instead. From 1932, he collaborated with the Czechoslovak Radio and from 1937, he directed broadcasts for schools and youth in this institution.

In 1941, Pleva married Veronika Kvasničková (1911–1995). In the same year he retired from teaching due to problems with hearing loss. In 1951–1952, he was the director of the Brno studio of the Czechoslovak Radio, then he was deputy chairman of the Czechoslovak State Committee for Radio in Prague. After a heart attack in 1954, he gave up all functions and returned to Brno. After the normalization in 1968, he withdrew from public life.

Pleva died in Brno in 1985 at the age of 86. He is buried at the Protestant cemetery in Nové Město na Moravě.

== Work ==
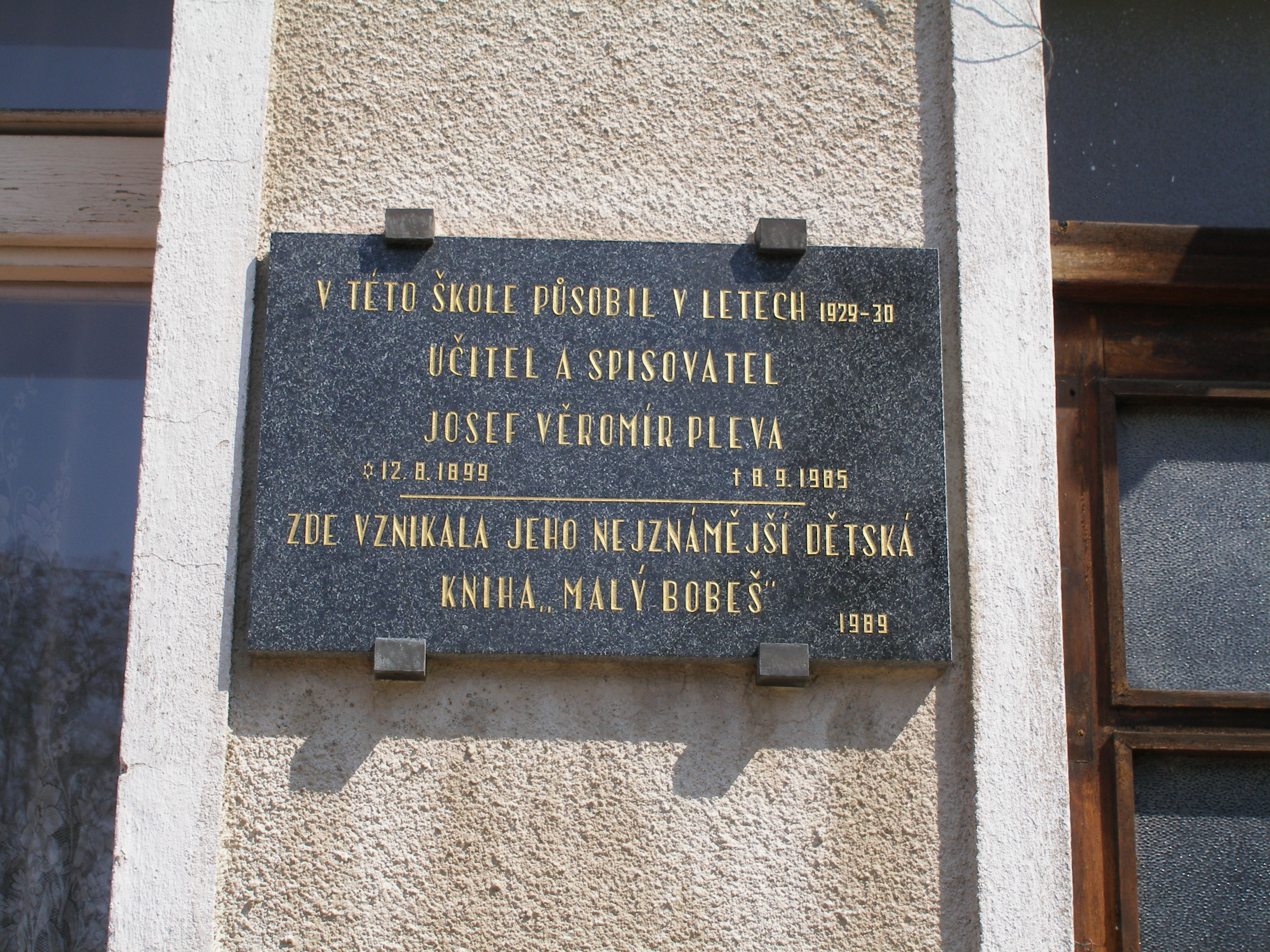
Memorial plaque at the former school in Černouček, which says that in 1929–1930 Pleva taught and wrote his best-known book Malý Bobeš here

Pleva's first prose, Eskorta (1929), was about the resistance of ordinary soldiers against the war and their rebellion. He described the strongest experience of his youth. Pleva then wrote many books for children and young adults, often with socialist orientation. Among his most notable books are:

- Malý Bobeš (1931)
- Hoši s dynamitem (1934)
- Kapka vody (1935)
- Náruč maminčina (1943)
- Budík (1948)
- Robinson Crusoe (1956)
- Jediná cesta (1964)
- Dávno tomu (1970)

=== Malý Bobeš ===
Pleva's most famous work is Malý Bobeš ("Little Bobeš"). The book became compulsory reading in Czech schools for several decades and is still considered by many to be a gem of Czech children's literature. Between 1929 and 1930, Pleva wrote ten short stories about the little boy Bobeš, which he first published as a book in 1931. The text was reworked during subsequent editions of the book, and the definitive form of the book was published in 1953. In the book, Pleva describes a view of the interwar world through the eyes of a boy who experiences various boyhood incidents, but at the same time has to face the existential problems of the adult world.

== Honours and legacy ==
The films Malý Bobeš (1961) and Malý Bobeš ve městě (1962) were based on his book.

During his life, Pleva received several awards from the communist government of Czechoslovakia, including the Order of Victorious February.

In Brno-Žabovřesky is a street named Plevova after J. V. Pleva.
