= Černouček =

- Municipality
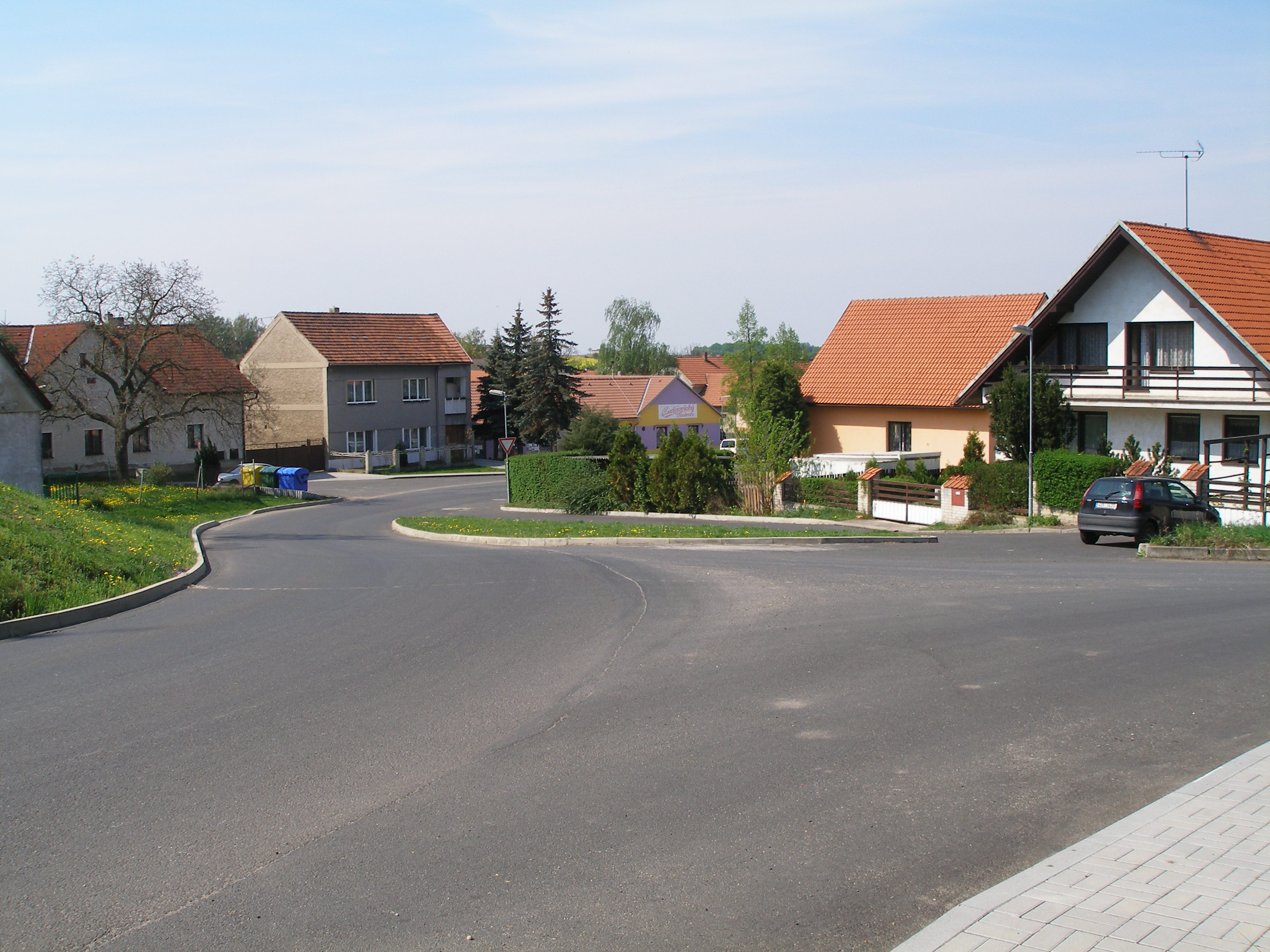
- Centre of Černouček

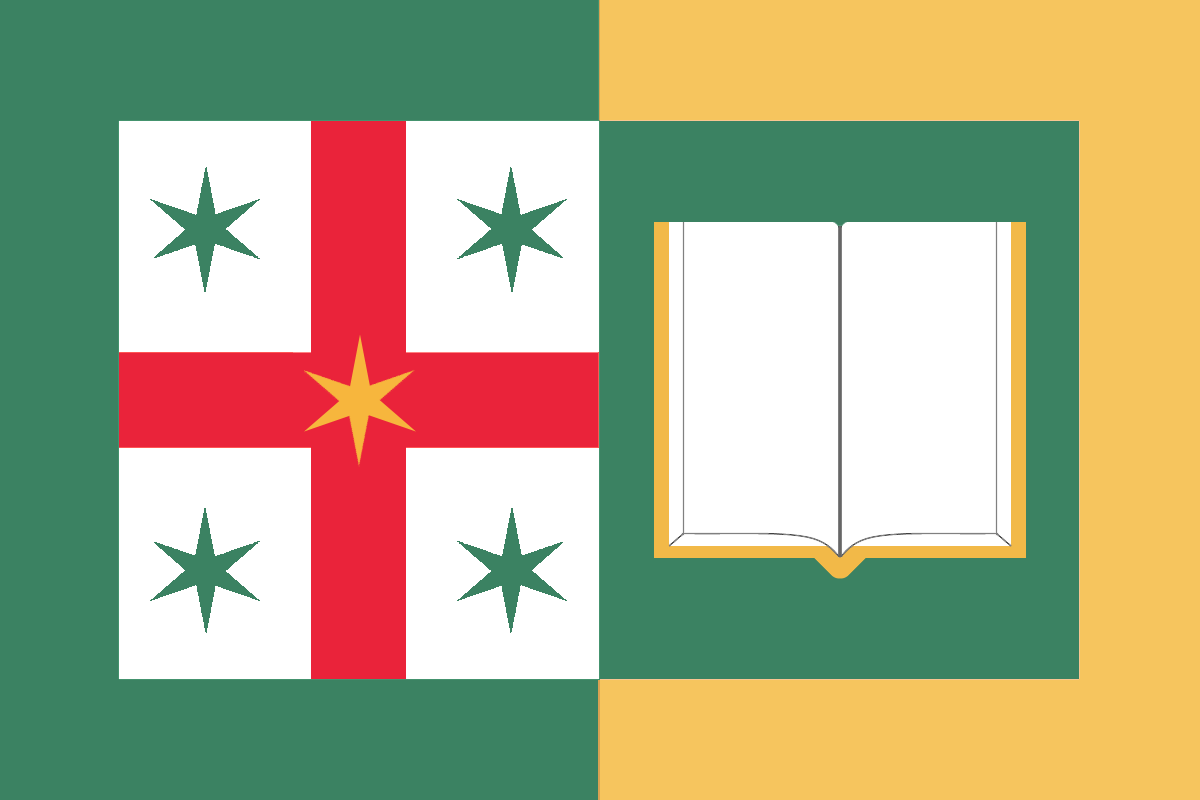
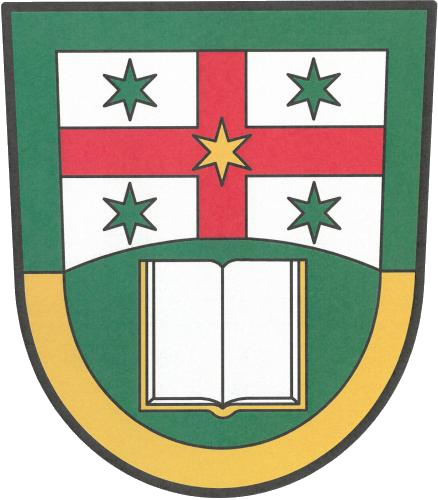
- Flag Coat of arms

- Location in the Czech Republic
- Coordinates: 50°21′39″N 14°18′27″E
- Country: Czech Republic
- Region: Ústí nad Labem
- District: Litoměřice
- First mentioned: 1100

Government
  - Mayor: Martin Král (AUTO)

Area
  - Total: 3.72 km^{2} (1.44 sq mi)
- Elevation: 245 m (804 ft)

Population (2026-01-01)
  - Total: 343
  - Density: 92.2/km^{2} (239/sq mi)
- Time zone: UTC+1 (CET)
  - Summer (DST): UTC+2 (CEST)
- Postal code: 413 01
- Website: www.cernoucek.cz

Černouček is a municipality and village in Litoměřice District in the Ústí nad Labem Region of the Czech Republic. It has about 300 inhabitants.

== Geography ==
Černouček is located about 12 kilometres (7 mi) west of Mělník and 28 km (17 mi) north of Prague. It lies in a flat landscape in the Lower Ohře Table, in the Polabí lowlands.

== History ==
The first written mention of Černouček is from 1100, when the village was donated to the Vyšehrad Chapter. From the 16th century until the establishment of an independent municipality, Černouček was part of the Roudnice estate and shared its owners.

== Demographics ==
Historical population

Year	Pop.	±%
1869	388	—
1880	427	+10.1%
1890	414	−3.0%
1900	438	+5.8%
1910	453	+3.4%

Year	Pop.	±%
1921	457	+0.9%
1930	451	−1.3%
1950	312	−30.8%
1961	346	+10.9%
1970	306	−11.6%

Year	Pop.	±%
1980	257	−16.0%
1991	211	−17.9%
2001	260	+23.2%
2011	278	+6.9%
2021	315	+13.3%

Source: Censuses

== Transport ==
There are no railways or major roads passing through the municipality.

== Sights ==
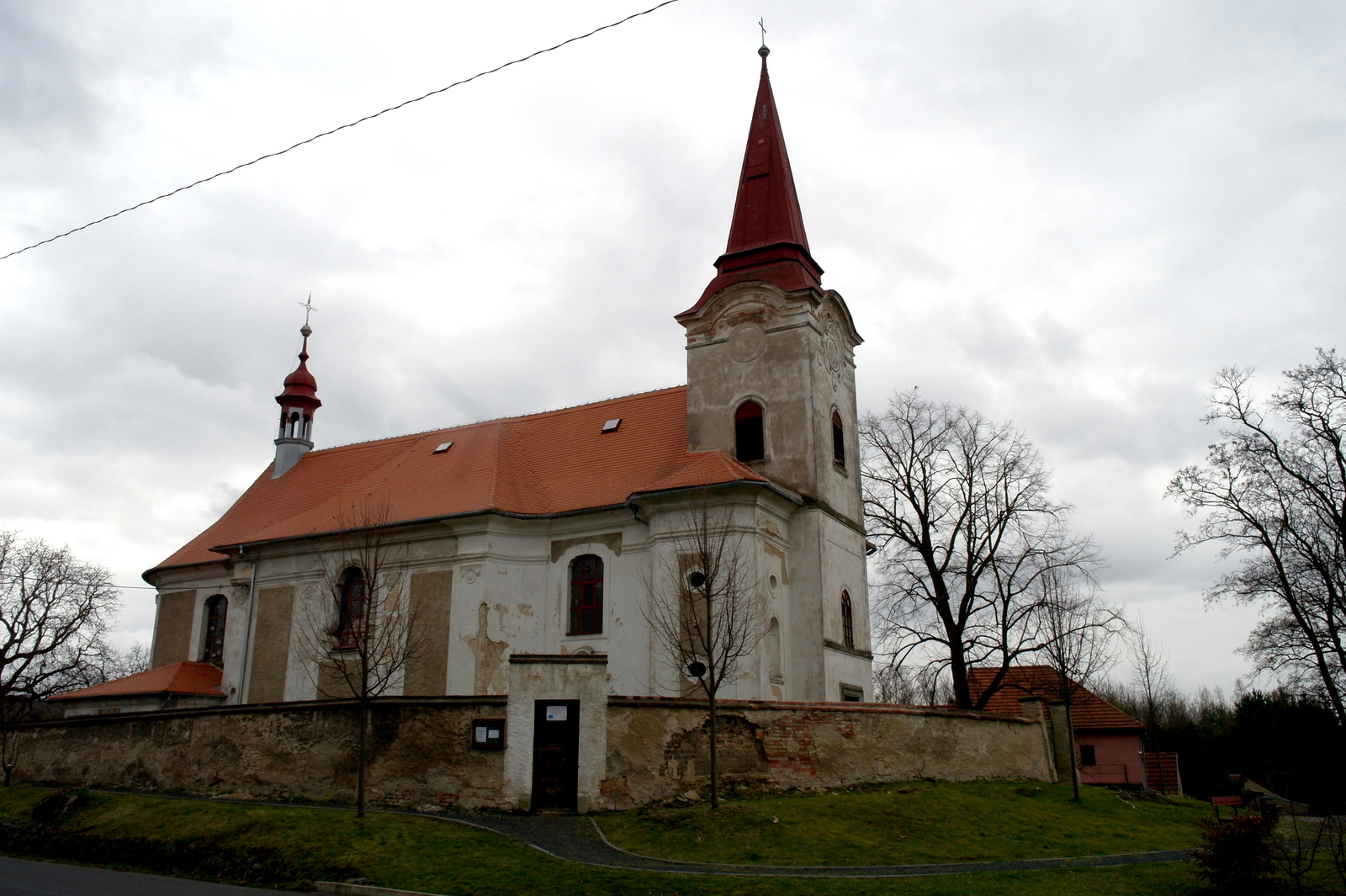
Church of Saint Bartholomew

The main landmark of Černouček is the Church of Saint Bartholomew. It was originally a Romanesque church. In 1769–1774, it was replaced by a new Baroque building.

== Notable people ==
- Josef Věromír Pleva (1899–1985), writer; taught in local school in 1929–1930
- Petr Pavel (born 1961), army general and president of the Czech Republic; lives here
- Eva Pavlová (born 1964), first lady of the Czech Republic, municipal assembly of Černouček; lives here

== Gallery ==
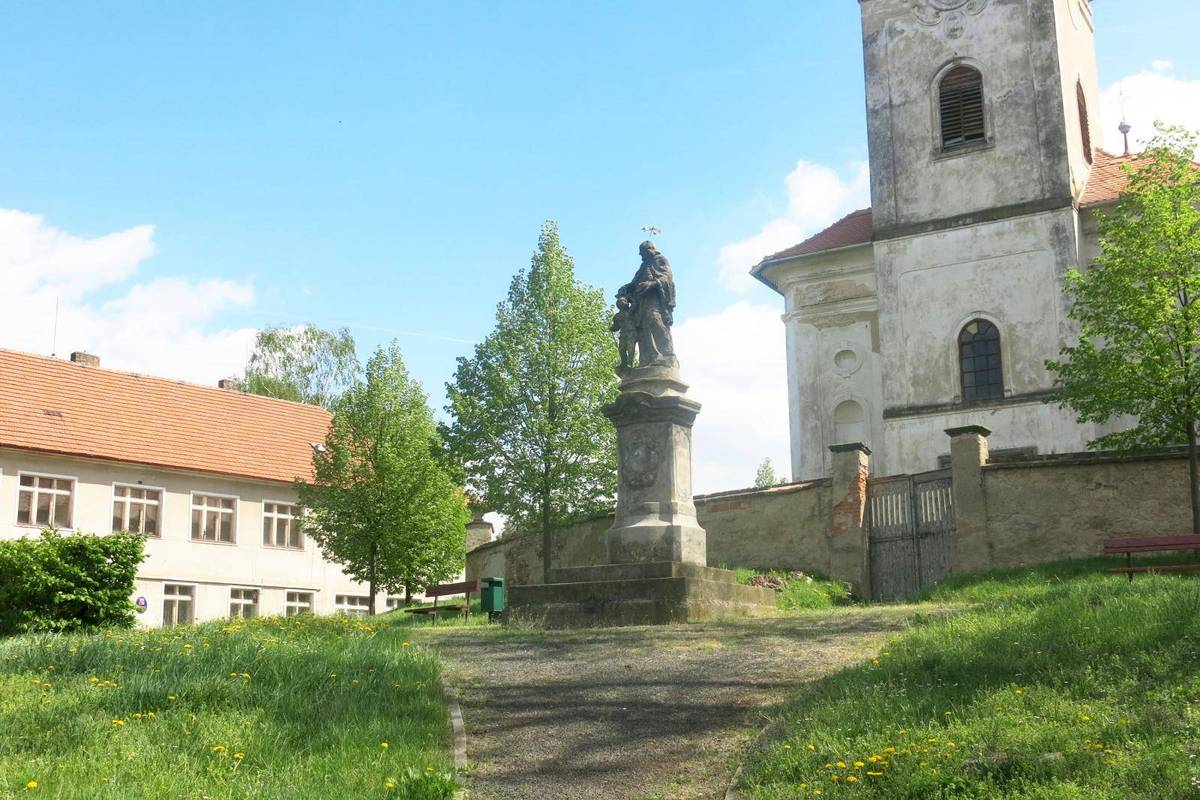
St. Joseph statue in front of the church

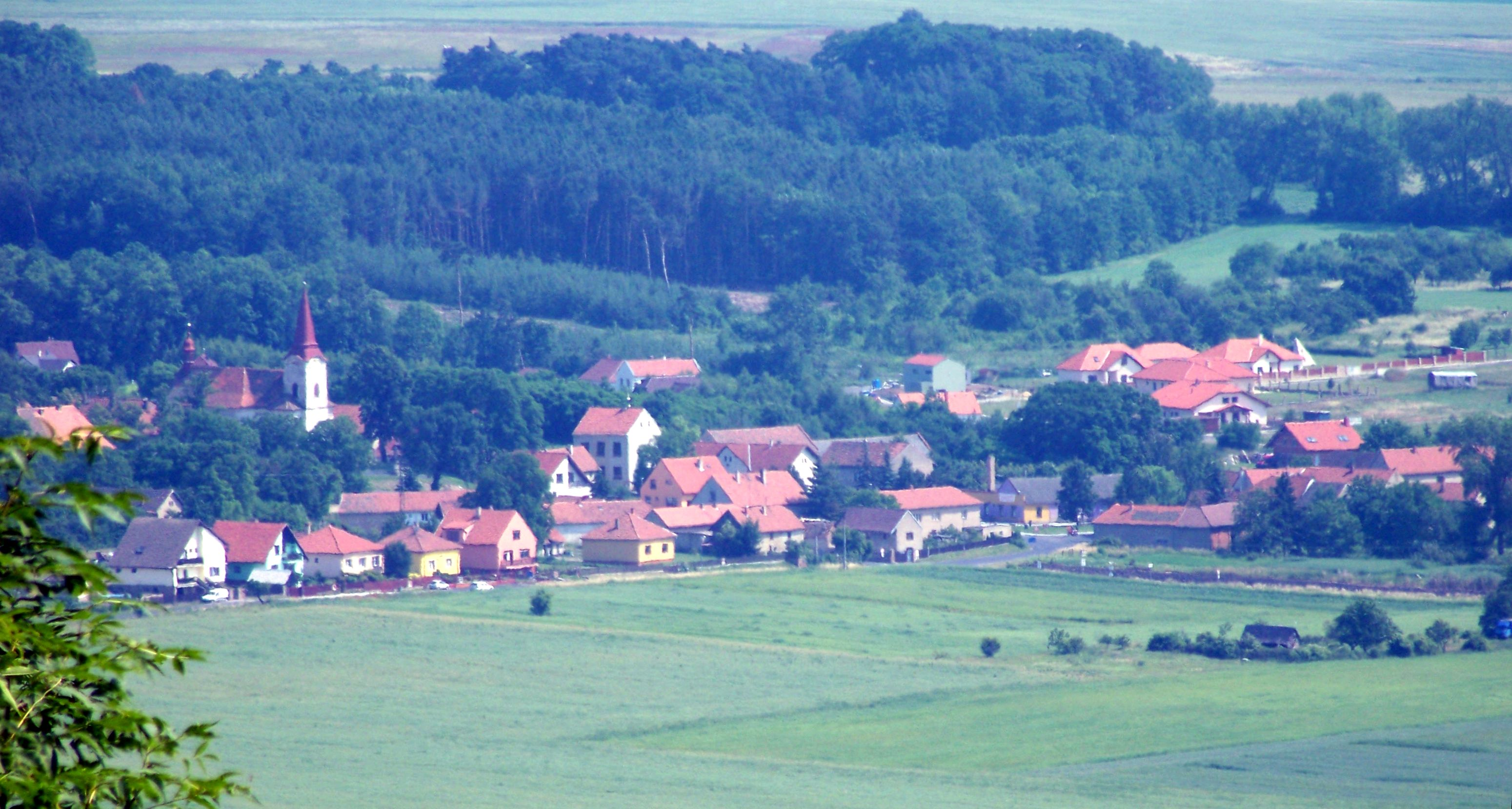
View of Černouček from Říp

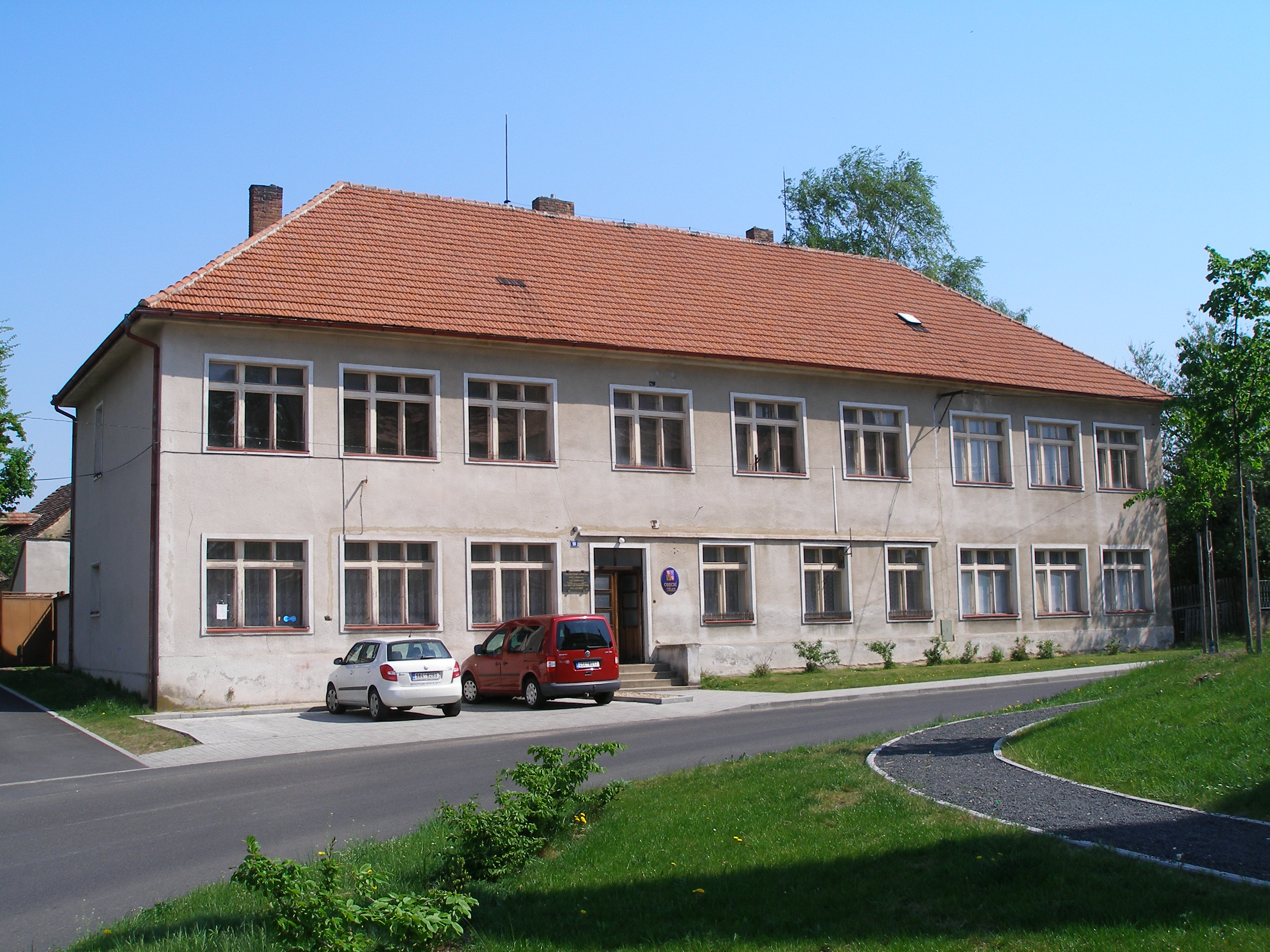
Municipal office, formerly a school
