= Veselíčko (Žďár nad Sázavou) =

- Village
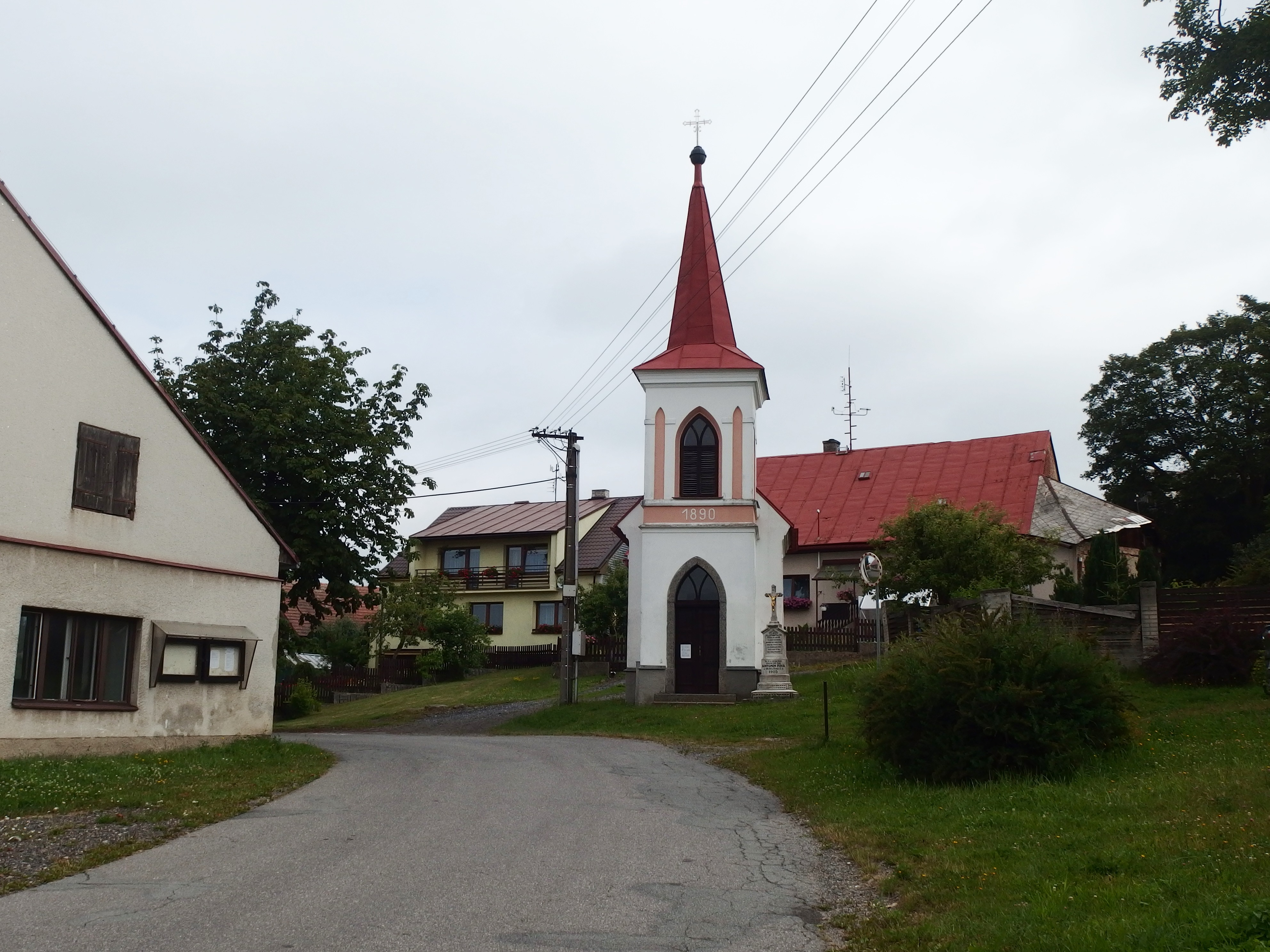
- Church of Saints Peter and Paul

- Location in the Czech Republic
- Coordinates: 49°33′23″N 16°0′20″E
- Country: Czech Republic
- Region: Vysočina
- District: Žďár nad Sázavou
- Municipality: Žďár nad Sázavou
- Founded: 1788

Area
  - Total: 3.01 km^{2} (1.16 sq mi)
- Elevation: 639 m (2,096 ft)

Population (2021)
  - Total: 163
  - Density: 54.2/km^{2} (140/sq mi)
- Time zone: UTC+1 (CET)
  - Summer (DST): UTC+2 (CEST)
- Postal code: 591 01
- Website: veselicko.zdarns.cz

Veselíčko (German: Klein Wesseln) is a village and municipal part of Žďár nad Sázavou in Žďár nad Sázavou District in the Vysočina Region of the Czech Republic. It has about 200 inhabitants. It is located in the eastern part of the town's territory.

== History ==
The first mention of the locality dates from the 17th century, when a manorial farm was established there under the supervision of Abbot Václav Vejmluva. The manorial farm was at the time colloquially referred to as Samotín (lit. 'lonely place').

In 1788, the manorial farm was parcelled into 25 smallholdings and the village Veselíčko was founded. Just a year later it received its official municipal seal.

In 1889, a major fire destroyed 25 houses and a local simple bell tower. A year later, during the reconstruction, the Chapel of Saints Peter and Paul was built as a replacement.

From 1850 to 1905, Veselíčko was administered as a municipal part of Slavkovice (today part of Nové Město na Moravě). In 1906, it became an independent municipality. Since 1980, it has been a municipal part of the town Žďár nad Sázavou.

== Demographics ==
Historical population

Year	Pop.	±%
1869	180	—
1880	164	−8.9%
1890	197	+20.1%
1900	174	−11.7%
1910	179	+2.9%

Year	Pop.	±%
1921	199	+11.2%
1930	192	−3.5%
1950	181	−5.7%
1961	211	+16.6%
1970	202	−4.3%

Year	Pop.	±%
1980	204	+1.0%
1991	198	−2.9%
2001	193	−2.5%
2011	181	−6.2%
2021	163	−9.9%

Source: Censuses

== Transport ==
The I/19 road from Žďár nad Sázavou to Boskovice runs next to the village.

Since 1905, Veselíčko has had a train station on the non-electrified single track railway between Žďár nad Sázavou and Tišnov.

== Sights ==
There are no protected cultural monuments in the municipality. In the local tavern is a functional orchestrion, which has been there since 1921.
