= Eva Pavlová =

Czech officer and politician

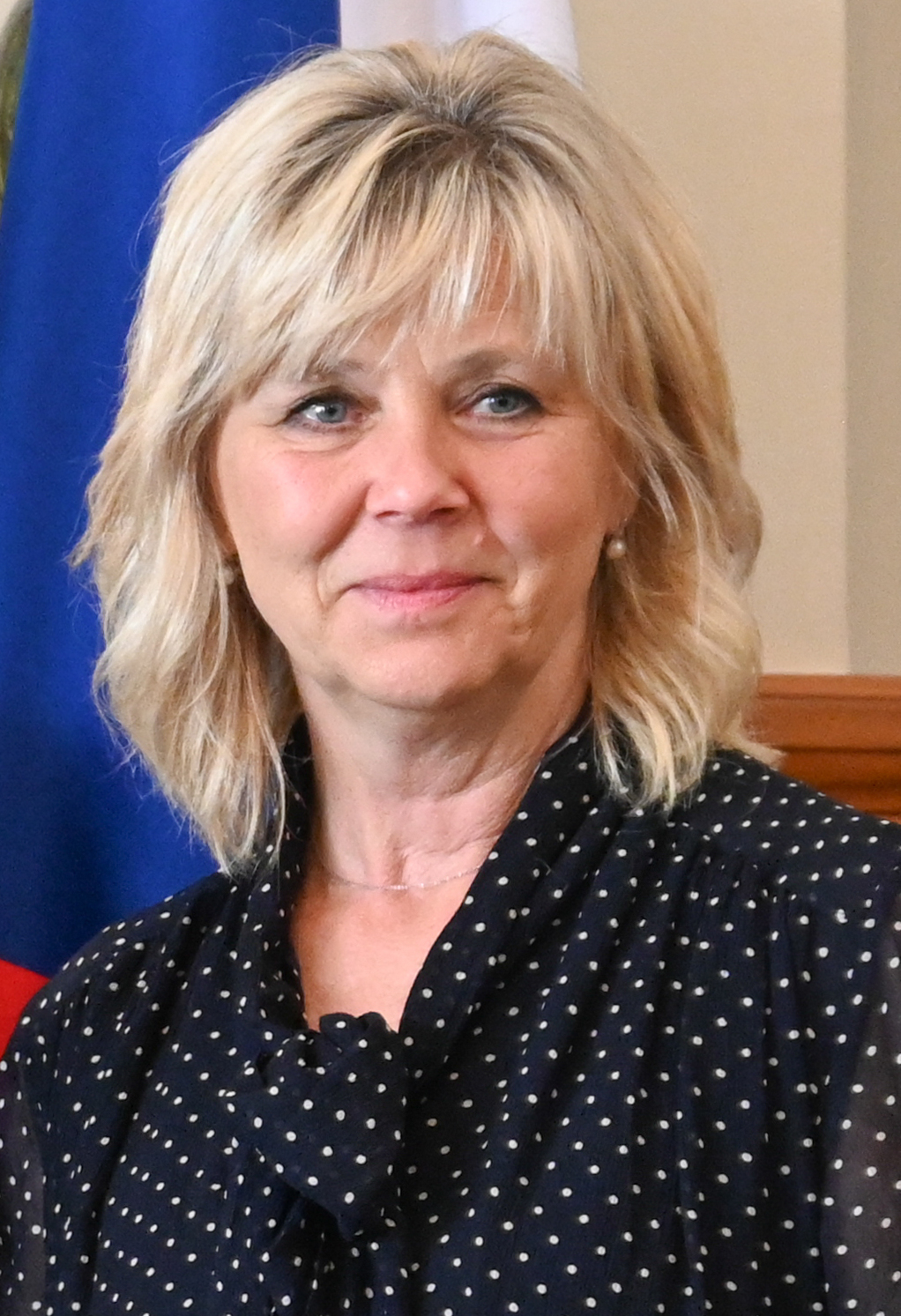
- Pavlová in 2024

First Lady of the Czech Republic
- Incumbent
- Assumed role 9 March 2023
- President: Petr Pavel
- Preceded by: Ivana Zemanová

Personal details
- Born: 5 November 1964 (age 61) Šumperk, Czechoslovakia
- Party: Communist (1985–1989)
- Spouse: Petr Pavel (m. 2004)
- Children: 1
- Education: Military Political Academy (1986–1990)

Military service
- Allegiance: Czechoslovakia (1983–1992); Czech Republic (1993–2018)
- Branch/service: Czech Army
- Years of service: 1983–2018
- Rank: Lieutenant colonel

Eva Pavlová (née Zelená; born 5 November 1964) is a Czech military officer who has been the first lady of the Czech Republic since March 2023 as the wife of President Petr Pavel. Pavlová also serves as a lieutenant colonel in the Czech Army reserve and as a member of the municipal assembly in her home municipality of Černouček.

== Early life and education ==
Pavlová graduated from grammar school and, as part of her sports activities, was mainly involved in shooting. After graduating in 1983, she continued her studies at the Female Military Vocational School at the High Military Aviation School in Košice. In 1985, she decided to continue her military career and signed up to study at the Military Political Academy in Bratislava in a program intended for future communist political commissars. She later stated that she was initially informed that she did not have a suitable "staff profile". She thus submitted an application to the Communist Party of Czechoslovakia. She finished school in 1990. At the beginning of the Velvet Revolution, on 20 November 1989, she resigned from the Communist Party. She then evaluated her membership in the party as a mistake.

Pavlová met Petr Pavel at the garrison dormitory in Prostějov. However, since they both had partners, their relationship did not begin until several years later. The wedding took place in 2004. She later worked at the General Staff at time when Petr Pavel was Chief of Staff, being put in charge of communication with foreign military and aviation attachés to the Czech Republic. After leaving the army, she started working as an assistant in a Prague family mediation centre. She lives with her husband in the village of Černouček. She participated in the 2022 municipal elections as a non-party member of SNK Černouček 2022 and was elected as a member of the municipal assembly.

== Family ==
Pavlová has a daughter from a previous marriage, Eva Friedlová, who was born in 1992.

== Honours ==
- Netherlands: Grand Cross of the Order of the Crown (4 June 2025)

== Gallery ==
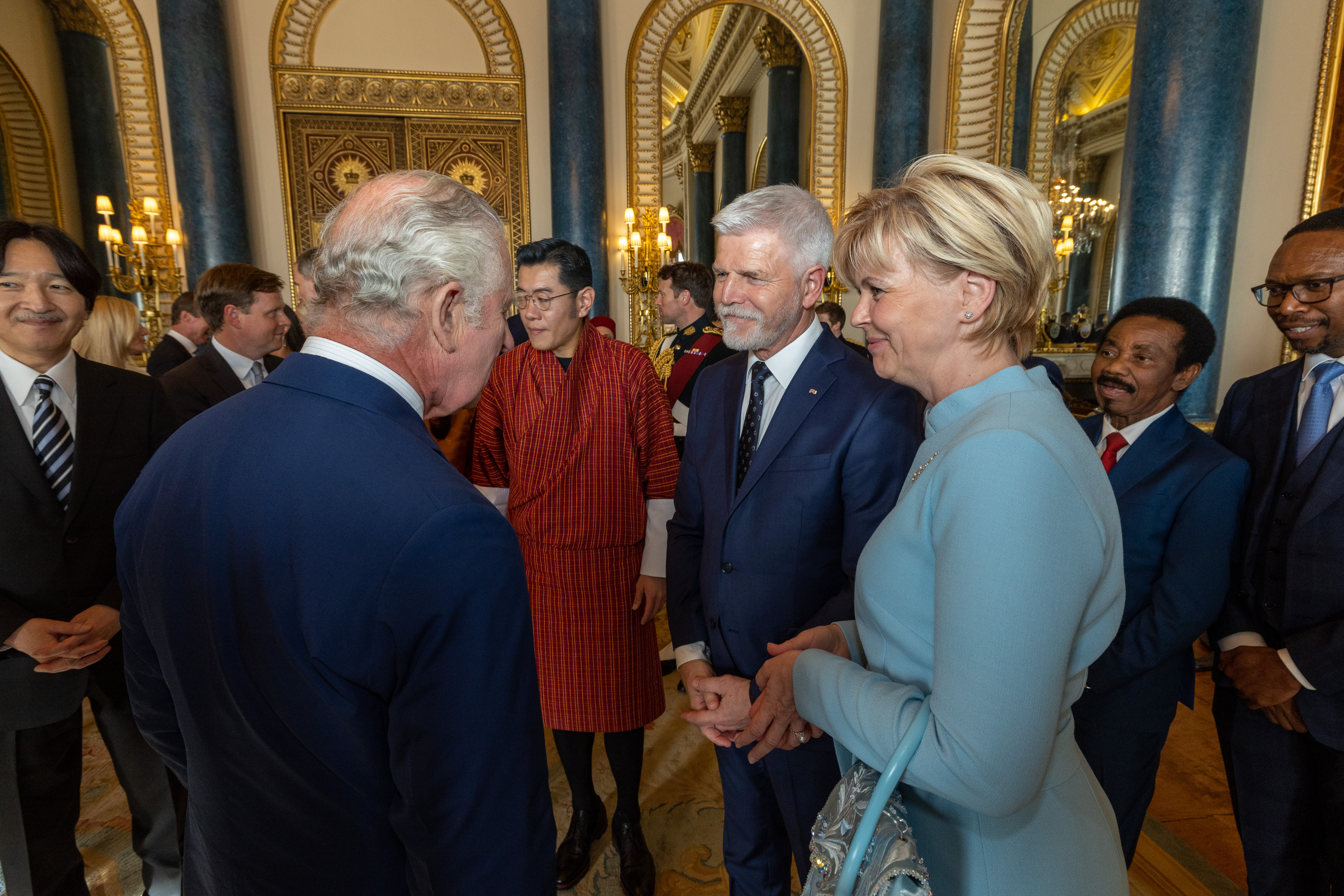
Eva Pavlová accompanying her husband during a HM King Charles III reception at Buckingham Palace, May 2023

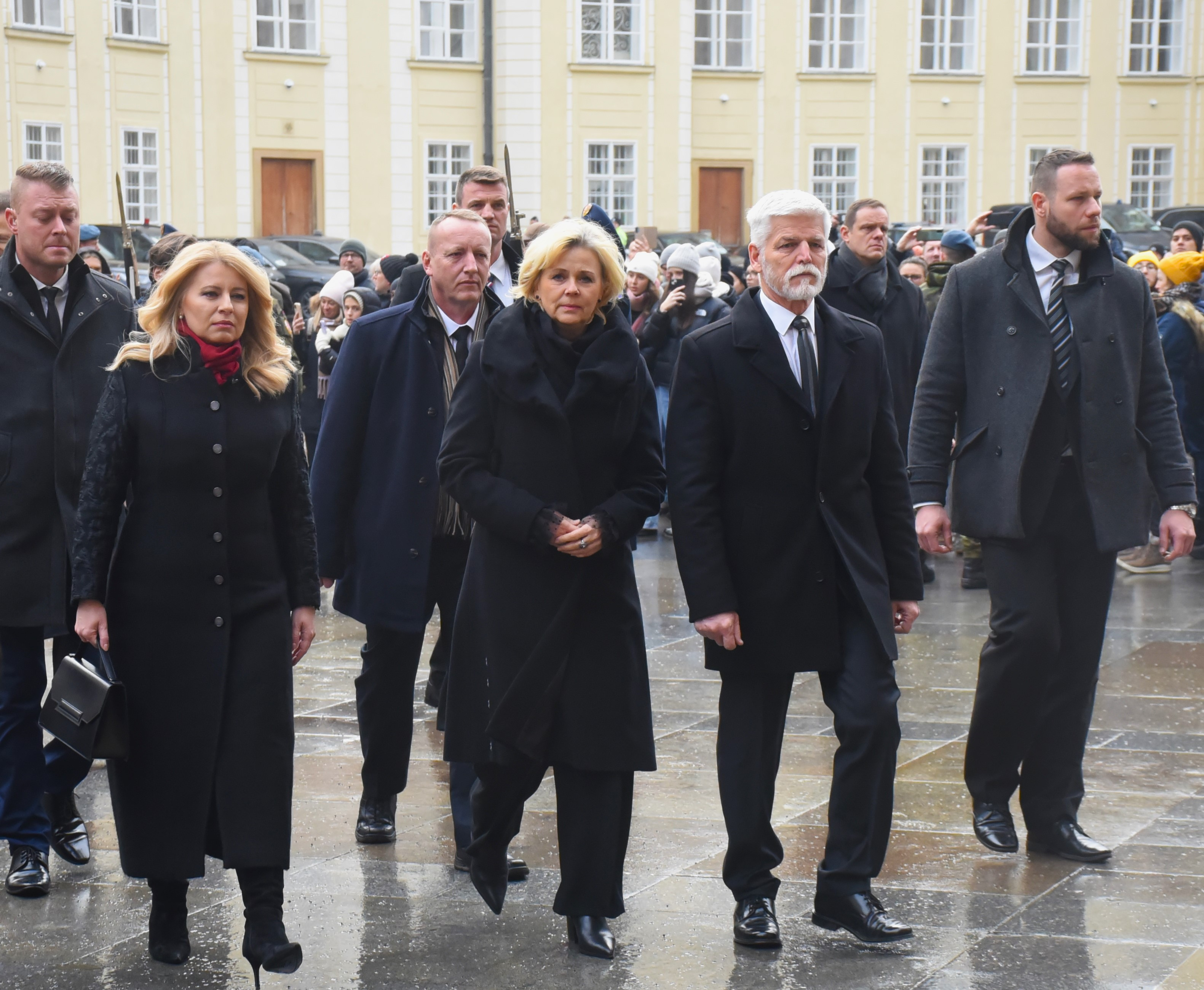
The first lady between her husband and Slovak president Zuzana Čaputová before farewell to Karel Schwarzenberg, December 2023

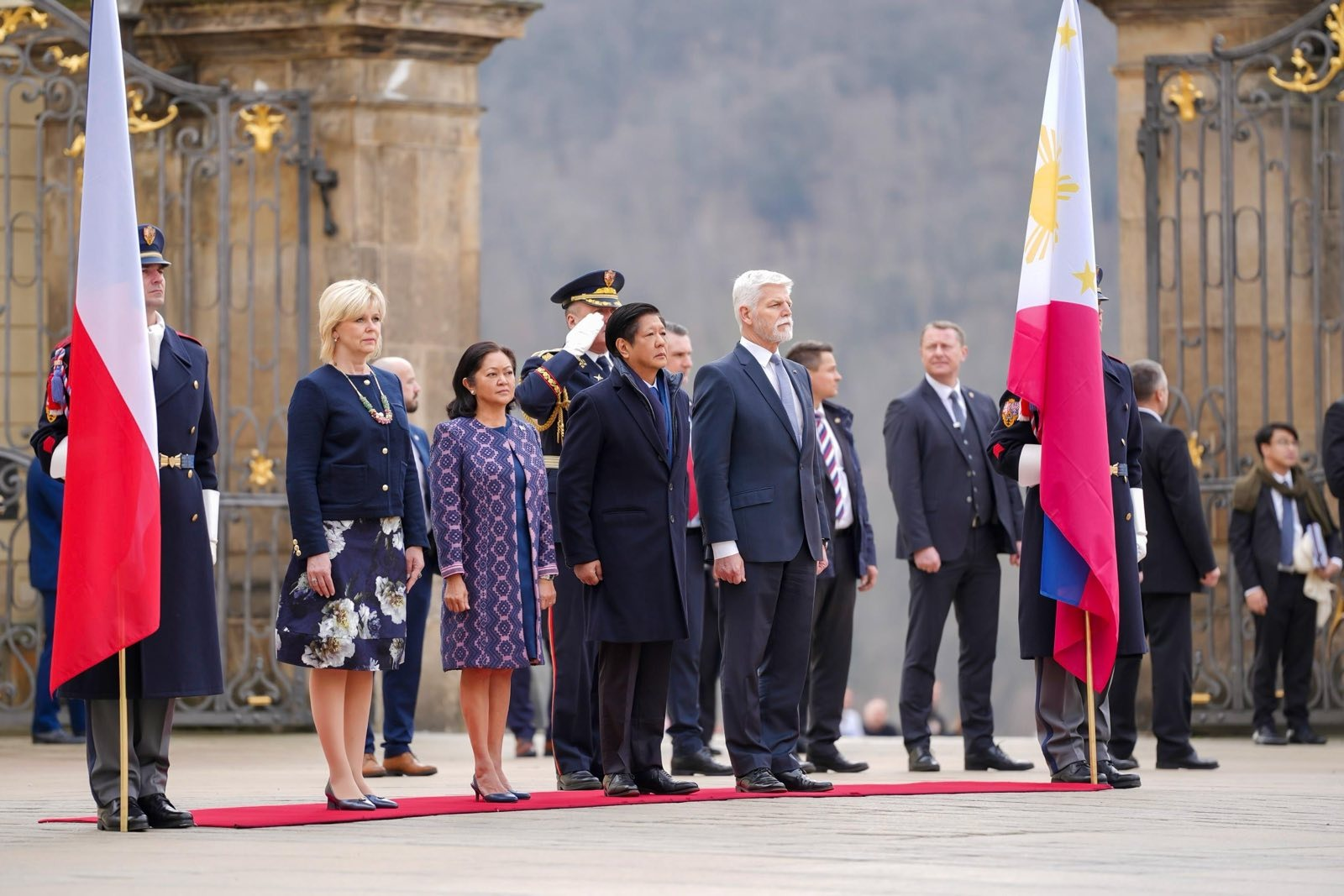
Presidential couples of the Czech Republic and the Philippines at Prague castle, March 2024

Honorary titles
| Preceded by Ivana Zemanová | First Lady of the Czech Republic; 2023–present | Current holder |
