= Zadina =

Zadina (feminine: Zadinová) is a Czech surname, meaning 'chaff' (waste from grain cleaning). It could have been a name used to designate an agricultural worker. However, the surname could also have originated from the adjective zadní ('rear', 'back') and referred to someone who lived in the back part of the village. Notable people with the surname include:

- Bridger Zadina (born 1994), American actor
- Filip Zadina (born 1999), Czech ice hockey player

== See also ==
- Pleva, a surname with the same meaning
