= Nové Město na Moravě =

- Town
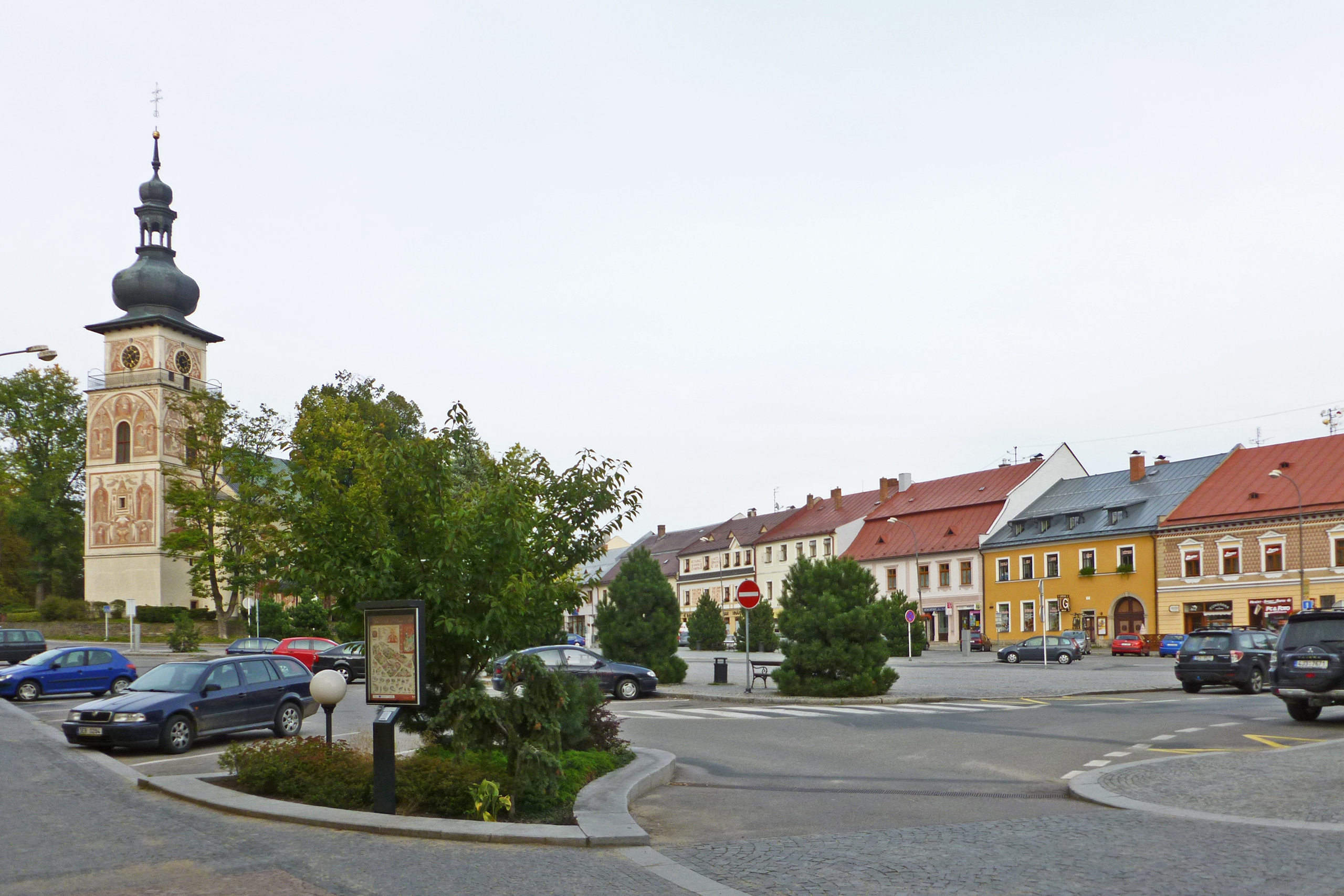
- The square Vratislavovo náměstí

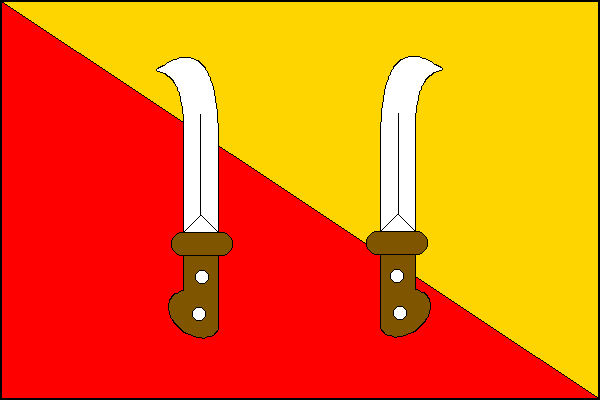
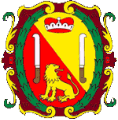
- Flag Coat of arms

- Location in the Czech Republic
- Coordinates: 49°33′41″N 16°4′27″E
- Country: Czech Republic
- Region: Vysočina
- District: Žďár nad Sázavou
- First mentioned: 1267

Government
  - Mayor: Michal Šmarda

Area
  - Total: 61.13 km^{2} (23.60 sq mi)
- Elevation: 594 m (1,949 ft)

Population (2026-01-01)
  - Total: 9,716
  - Density: 158.9/km^{2} (411.7/sq mi)
- Time zone: UTC+1 (CET)
  - Summer (DST): UTC+2 (CEST)
- Postal code: 592 31
- Website: www.nmnm.cz

Nové Město na Moravě (Czech pronunciation: [ˈnovɛː ˈmɲɛsto ˈna moravjɛ]; German: Neustadt in Mähren) is a town in Žďár nad Sázavou District in the Vysočina Region of the Czech Republic. It has about 9,700 inhabitants. Located in the Křižanov Highlands, Nové Město na Moravě is a winter sports resort, known primarily for hosting biathlon competitions.

Among the most important feudal owners of the town were the Pernštejn family, during whose rule in the 16th century the town experienced its greatest prosperity. The historic town centre with Renaissance, Baroque and Neoclassical houses is well preserved and is protected as an urban monument zone.

== Administrative division ==
Nové Město na Moravě consists of ten municipal parts (in brackets population according to the 2021 census):

- Nové Město na Moravě (7,250)
- Hlinné (166)
- Jiříkovice (235)
- Maršovice (246)
- Olešná (241)
- Petrovice (211)
- Pohledec (462)
- Rokytno (215)
- Slavkovice (431)
- Studnice (31)

== Etymology ==
The name Nové Město na Moravě literally means 'new town in Moravia' in Czech.

== Geography ==
Nové Město na Moravě is located about 9 kilometres (6 mi) east of Žďár nad Sázavou and 53 km (33 mi) northwest of Brno. It lies in the Křižanov Highlands, in the highest parts of the whole Bohemian-Moravian Highlands. The highest point is Kopeček at 822 m (2,697 ft) above sea level. The upper course of the Bobrůvka River flows through the town and supplies several small fishponds there. Most of the municipal territory is located in the Žďárské vrchy Protected Landscape Area.

== History ==
The first written mention of Nové Město na Moravě is from 1267 under the name Bočkov. It was founded during the colonisation by royal burgrave Boček of Obřany after the nearby Cistercian monastery in Žďár nad Sázavou was established in 1252, not later than in 1255. The name Nové Město was used for the first time in a deed of King Wenceslaus II from 1293 and it was first referred to as a market town.

In 1312, Nové Město was inherited by Lords of Lipá. Probably in the late 14th century, they had built a fortress here. In 1496, it was acquired by Vilém II of Pernštejn. During the rule of the Pernštejn family (especially under Vratislav II of Pernštejn in 1561–1582), the town experienced an economic boom. The Renaissance town hall was built and the fortress was rebuilt into a Renaissance castle. The Pernštejn family owned Nové Město until 1588. The next owners were Vilém Dubský, who reconstructed the castle, Archbishop Franz von Dietrichstein, and the Kratzer family, who took care of the economic prosperity of the estate and supported glass making and ironworks in the estate.

At the end of the 19th century, skiing developed, thanks to which the town became a centre of winter sports. The railway was built in 1905.

== Demographics ==
Historical population

Year	Pop.	±%
1869	5,871	—
1880	5,860	−0.2%
1890	5,746	−1.9%
1900	5,655	−1.6%
1910	5,761	+1.9%

Year	Pop.	±%
1921	5,466	−5.1%
1930	5,348	−2.2%
1950	6,021	+12.6%
1961	6,194	+2.9%
1970	8,196	+32.3%

Year	Pop.	±%
1980	9,730	+18.7%
1991	10,426	+7.2%
2001	10,471	+0.4%
2011	9,989	−4.6%
2021	9,488	−5.0%

Source: Censuses

== Economy ==
The largest employer based in the town is the local hospital. There are only small and medium-sized industrial enterprises.

Despite its mountainous location, the town has a long tradition of manufacturing. Among the significant employers are Sporten, producer of ski equipment, and Medin, producer of medical instruments. Other production includes wireless communication modems by Racom.

== Transport ==
The I/19 road from Žďár nad Sázavou to Boskovice passes through the town.

Nové Město na Moravě is located on a short railway line from Žďár nad Sázavou to Tišnov.

== Culture ==
Nové Město na Moravě is located in the ethnographic region of Horácko.

== Sport ==
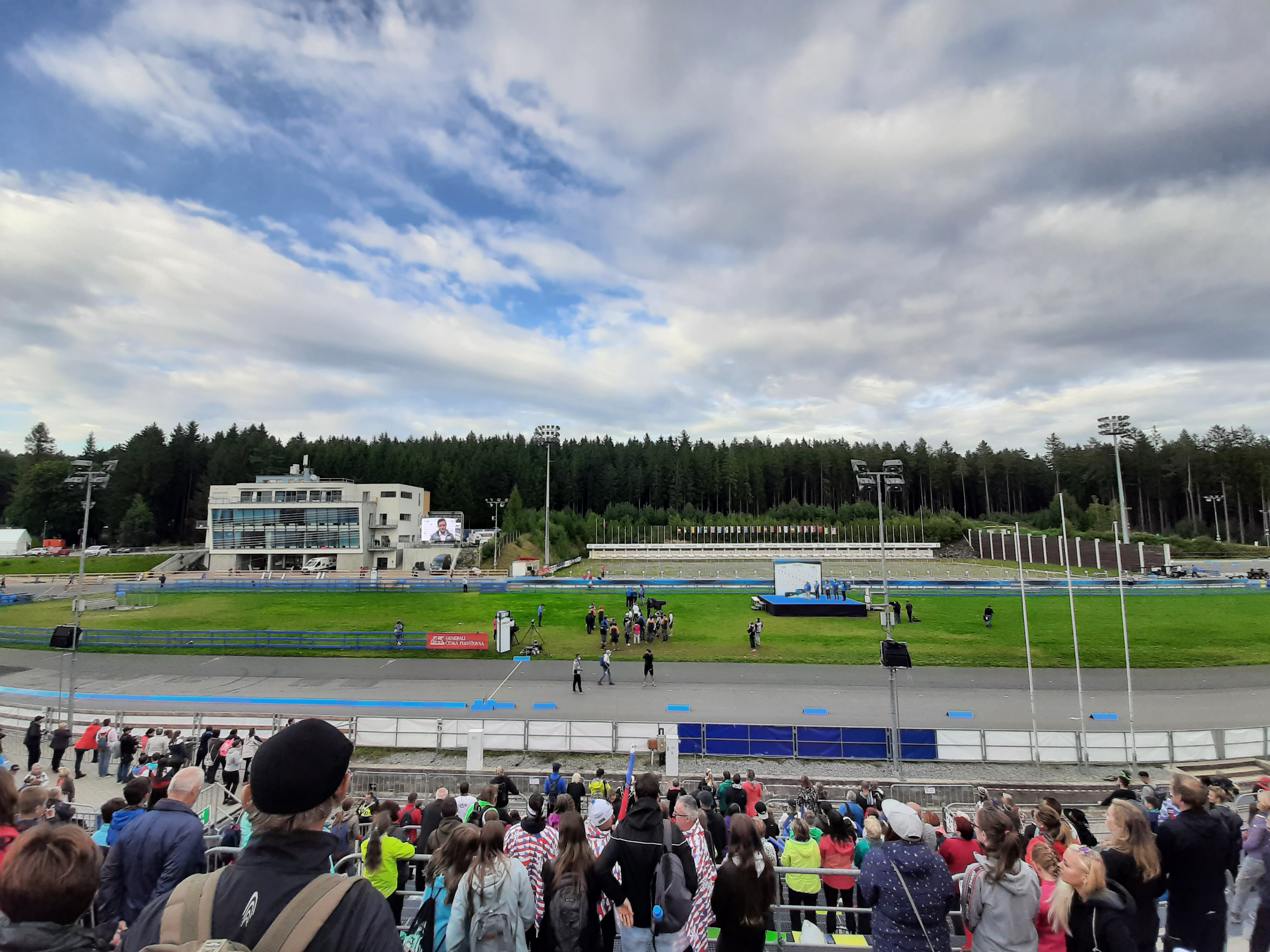
Vysočina Aréna

The town is a prominent Czech winter sports resort. The Vysočina Aréna hosted the 2013 and 2024 Biathlon World Championships and since the 2011–12 season, the Biathlon World Cup event has been held here more or less regularly. It also hosted events of the Tour de Ski in 2007–08 and 2008–09.

Mountain bike races are also being organised in Nové Město na Moravě, hosting races at the UCI Mountain Bike World Cup level as well as the cross-country event of the 2016 UCI Mountain Bike & Trials World Championships.

The local football club SFK Vrchovina Nové Město na Moravě plays in the Moravian-Silesian Football League, the third tier of the Czech football system.

== Sights ==
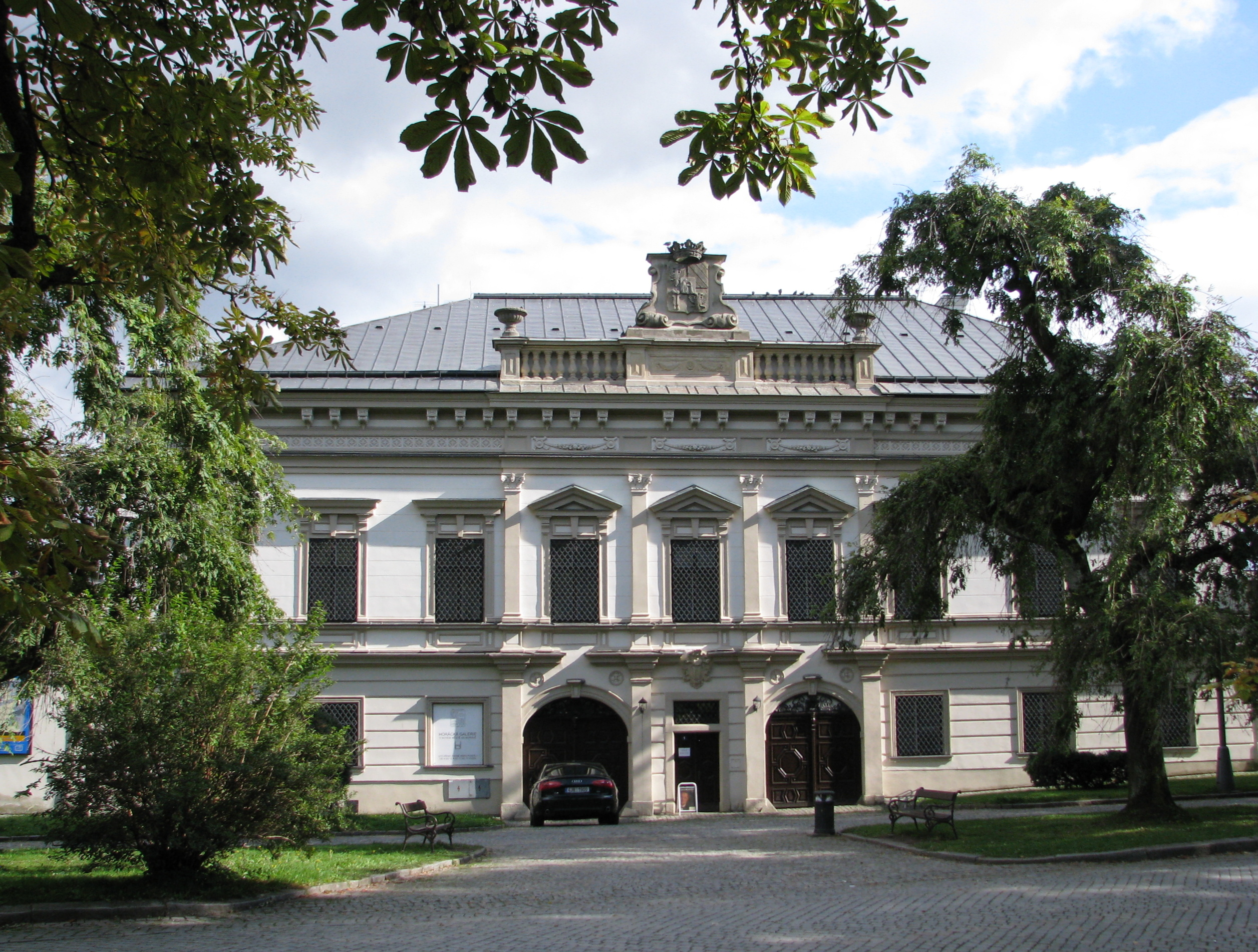
Horácko Art Gallery in the Nové Město na Moravě Castle

In the middle of the historic town centre is the square Vratislavovo náměstí, named after Vratislav of Pernštejn, where most of the landmarks of the town are located. The elongated square is lined with Renaissance, Baroque and Neoclassical houses. The historic centre is protected as an urban monument zone.

In the middle of the square is the Church of Saint Cunigunde, the oldest monument in the town. The first mention of the church is from 1362. It has façade sgraffito decoration by native artist Karel Němec, created in 1928–1929. There is also a fountain by Karel Němec on the square.

The castle in Nové Město na Moravě was rebuilt in the Baroque style in the 18th century, and in the Neo-Renaissance style in 1874. Nowadays the building houses the Horácko Art Gallery that focuses on glassmaking, landscaping and 20th-century sculpture.

The Renaissance building of the former town hall now serves as the Horácko Museum.

== Notable people ==
- Josef Vratislav Monse (1733–1793), historian
- Jan Štursa (1880–1925), sculptor
- Otakar Šín (1881–1943), composer
- Oldřich Blažíček (1887–1953), painter
- Jaromír Nečas (1888–1945), politician
- Ivan Sekanina (1900–1940), journalist, lawyer and resistance fighter
- Vincenc Makovský (1900–1966), sculptor
- František Balvín (1915–2003), cross-country skier
- George Brady (1928–2019), Holocaust survivor and brother of Hana Brady
- Hana Brady (1931–1944), Jewish girl murdered in the Holocaust, subject of documentary and children's book Hana's Suitcase
- Miroslava Němcová (born 1952), politician
- Pavel Tlustoš (born 1955), agrochemist
- Vladimír Havlík (born 1959), action artist, painter
- Ivo Strejček (born 1962), politician
- Radek Jaroš (born 1964), mountaineer and author
- Ivana Zemanová (born 1965), First Lady of the Czech Republic
- Martin Koukal (born 1978), cross-country skier
- Martina Sáblíková (born 1987), speed skater
- Martin Nečas (born 1999), ice hockey player

== Twin towns – sister cities ==
Nové Město na Moravě is twinned with:

- Mizhhiria, Ukraine
- Waalre, Netherlands
- Ziano di Fiemme, Italy
