= Vlčice (Trutnov District) =

- Municipality
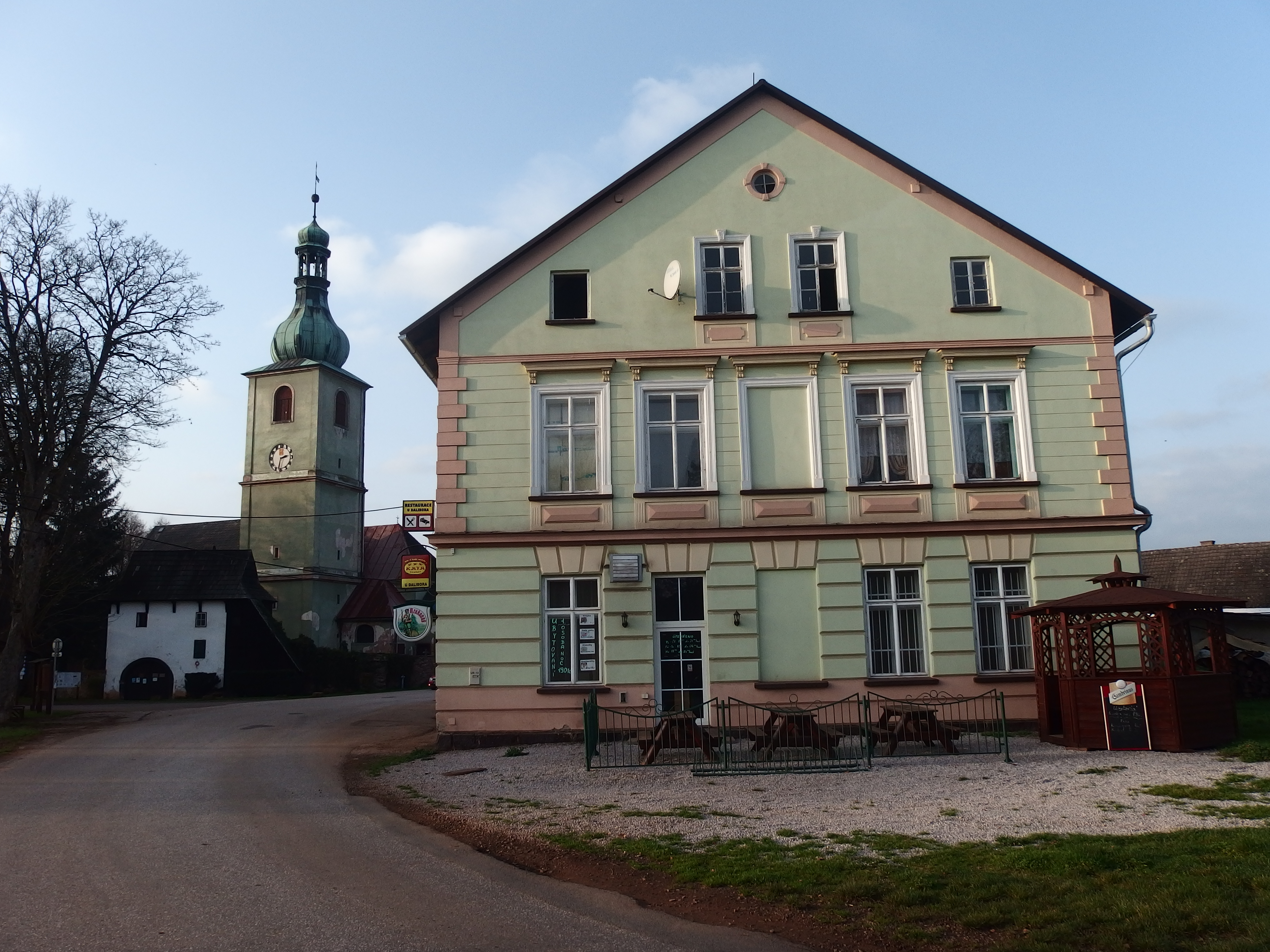
- Inn and Church of Saint Adalbert

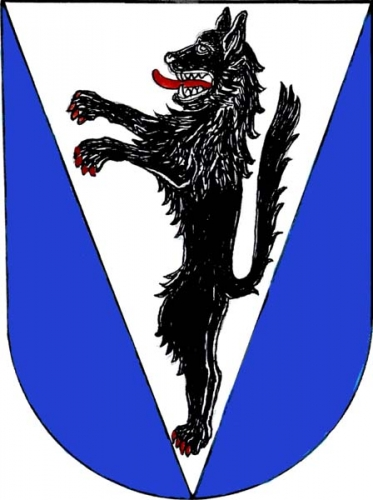
- Flag Coat of arms

- Location in the Czech Republic
- Coordinates: 50°33′45″N 15°49′18″E
- Country: Czech Republic
- Region: Hradec Králové
- District: Trutnov
- First mentioned: 1362

Area
  - Total: 19.74 km^{2} (7.62 sq mi)
- Elevation: 367 m (1,204 ft)

Population (2026-01-01)
  - Total: 578
  - Density: 29.3/km^{2} (75.8/sq mi)
- Time zone: UTC+1 (CET)
  - Summer (DST): UTC+2 (CEST)
- Postal code: 541 01
- Website: www.ou-vlcice.cz

Vlčice (German: Wildschütz) is a municipality and village in Trutnov District in the Hradec Králové Region of the Czech Republic. It has about 600 inhabitants.

== Demographics ==
Historical population
Year	Pop.	±%
1869	1,248	—
1880	1,183	−5.2%
1890	1,142	−3.5%
1900	1,122	−1.8%
1910	1,086	−3.2%
1921	987	−9.1%
1930	957	−3.0%
1950	504	−47.3%
1961	436	−13.5%
1970	424	−2.8%
1980	447	+5.4%
1991	397	−11.2%
2001	412	+3.8%
2011	489	+18.7%
2021	542	+10.8%
Source: Censuses

== Notable people ==
- Václav Havel (1936–2011), playwright, president of the Czech Republic; lived and died in the Hrádeček hamlet
