= First Lady of the Czech Republic =

Wife of the president of the Czech Republic

- První dáma České republiky
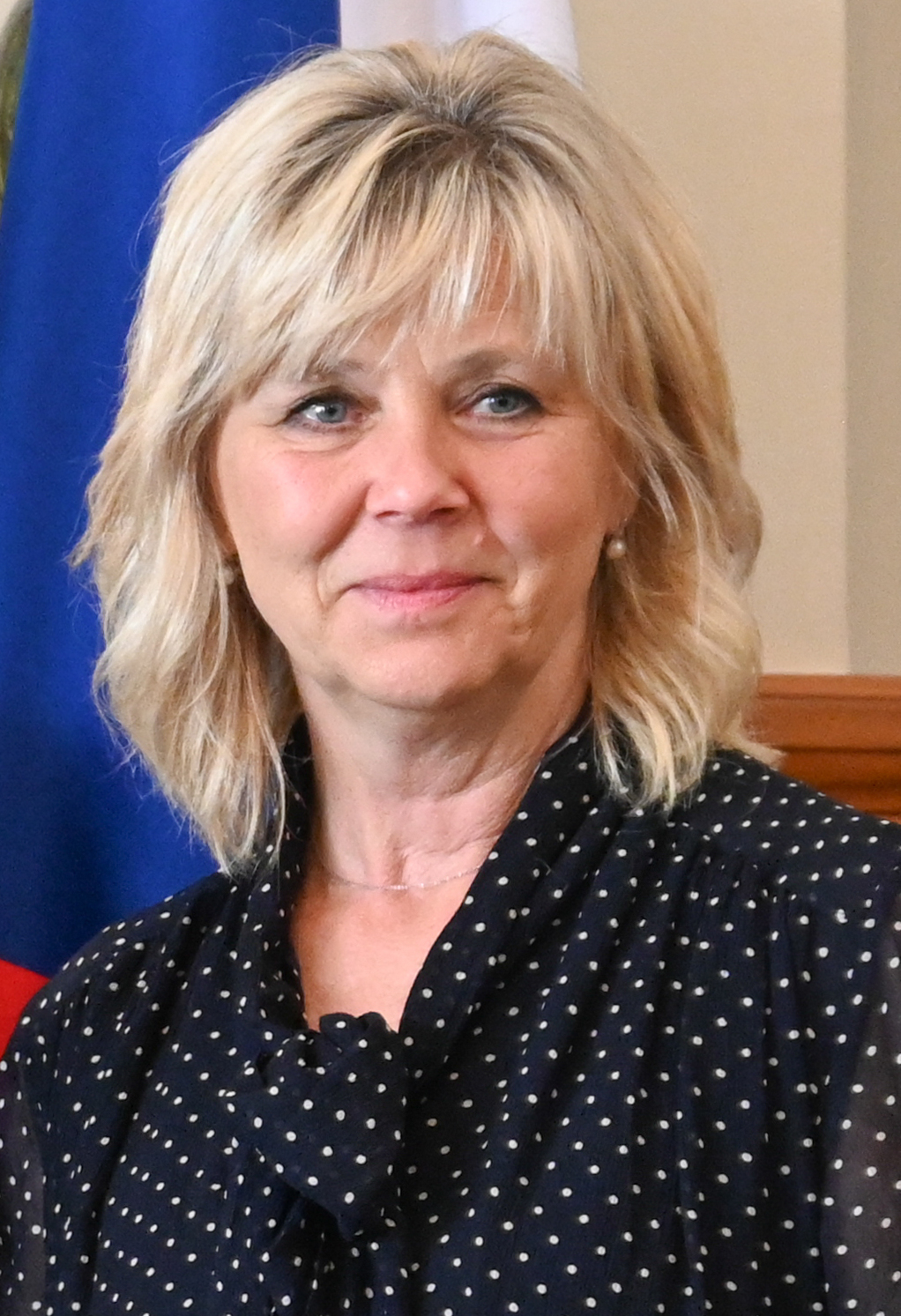
- Incumbent; Eva Pavlová since 9 March 2023
- Residence: Prague Castle
- Inaugural holder: Olga Havlová
- Formation: 2 February 1993
- Website: First Lady

The First Lady of the Czech Republic (Czech: První dáma České republiky) is the hostess of the Prague Castle, advisor to the president, and often plays a role in social activism. The position is traditionally held by the wife of the president of the Czech Republic, concurrent with his term of office. She has no official role in the presidency and her role is strictly ceremonial.

The current first lady of the Czech Republic is Eva Pavlová. She has been the first lady since 9 March 2023 as wife of President Petr Pavel.

== List of first ladies of the Czech Republic ==
No.	Portrait	Name	Marriage	Period	President
1		Olga Havlová (née Šplíchalová); 11 July 1933 – 27 January 1996 (aged 62)	1964	2 February 1993 – 27 January 1996	Václav Havel
Vacant					Václav Havel
2		Dagmar Havlová (née Veškrnová); Born: 22 March 1953 (age 73)	1997	4 January 1997 – 2 February 2003	Václav Havel
3		Livia Klausová (née Mištinová); Born: 10 November 1943 (age 82)	1968	7 March 2003 – 7 March 2013	Václav Klaus
4		Ivana Zemanová (née Bednarčíková); Born: 29 April 1965 (age 61)	1993	8 March 2013 – 8 March 2023	Miloš Zeman
5		Eva Pavlová (née Zelená); Born: 5 November 1964 (age 61)	2004	9 March 2023 – present	Petr Pavel

== See also ==
- First Lady of Czechoslovakia
