= Tsymbalyuk =

Tsymbalyuk is a Ukrainian surname. Notable people with the surname include:

- Alexander Tsymbalyuk (born 1976), Ukrainian bass opera singer
- Dmytro Tsymbaliuk, Ukrainian Greco-Roman wrestler
- Inna Tsymbalyuk (born 1985), Ukrainian actress, model and beauty pageant titleholder
- Kseniia Tsymbalyuk (born 1997), Russian road and track cyclist
- Mykhailo Tsymbaliuk, Ukrainian police officer, professor, and politician
- Yevhen Tsymbalyuk (born 1996), Ukrainian footballer
- Yuriy Tsymbalyuk, Soviet figure skater

== See also ==
- Cimbal
- Tsymbal
- Tsymbalar
- Zimbalist
