= Zimbalist =

Zimbalist, also Tsimbalist, is a Slavic-language surname of Ashkenazi Jewish origin, meaning "one who plays the cimbalom (a traditional string instrument of Central and Eastern Europe)". Notable people with the surname include

- Al Zimbalist (1910–1975), producer of low-budget films such as Cat Women of the Moon, Watusi, and Baby Face Nelson
- Andrew Zimbalist (born 1947), American economist, father of Jeff and Michael
- Efrem Zimbalist (1889–1985), Russian violinist, father of Efrem Jr.
- Efrem Zimbalist Jr. (1918–2014), American actor, son of Efrem and father of Stephanie
- Jeffrey "Jeff" (Leib Nettler) Zimbalist (born 1978), American documentary filmmaker, son of Andrew
- Michael Zimbalist (born 1980), American filmmaker, son of Andrew
- Mary Louise Curtis Bok Zimbalist (1876–1970), founder of the Curtis Institute of Music, married to Efrem
- Michelle Zimbalist Rosaldo (1944–1981), American anthropologist
- Sam Zimbalist (1901–1958), American Oscar-winning film producer
- Stephanie Zimbalist (born 1956), American actress, daughter of Efrem Jr.
- Ofra Zimbalista (1939–2014), Israeli sculptor
- Chen Zimbalista (born 1966), Israeli musician and conductor

== See also ==
- Cymbalista Synagogue and Jewish Heritage Center
- Cimbal
- Tsymbal
- Tsymbalar
- Tsymbalyuk
