= Church of the Holy Trinity, Fulnek =

Coordinates: 49°42′42.54″N 17°54′14.98″E

Church of the Holy Trinity
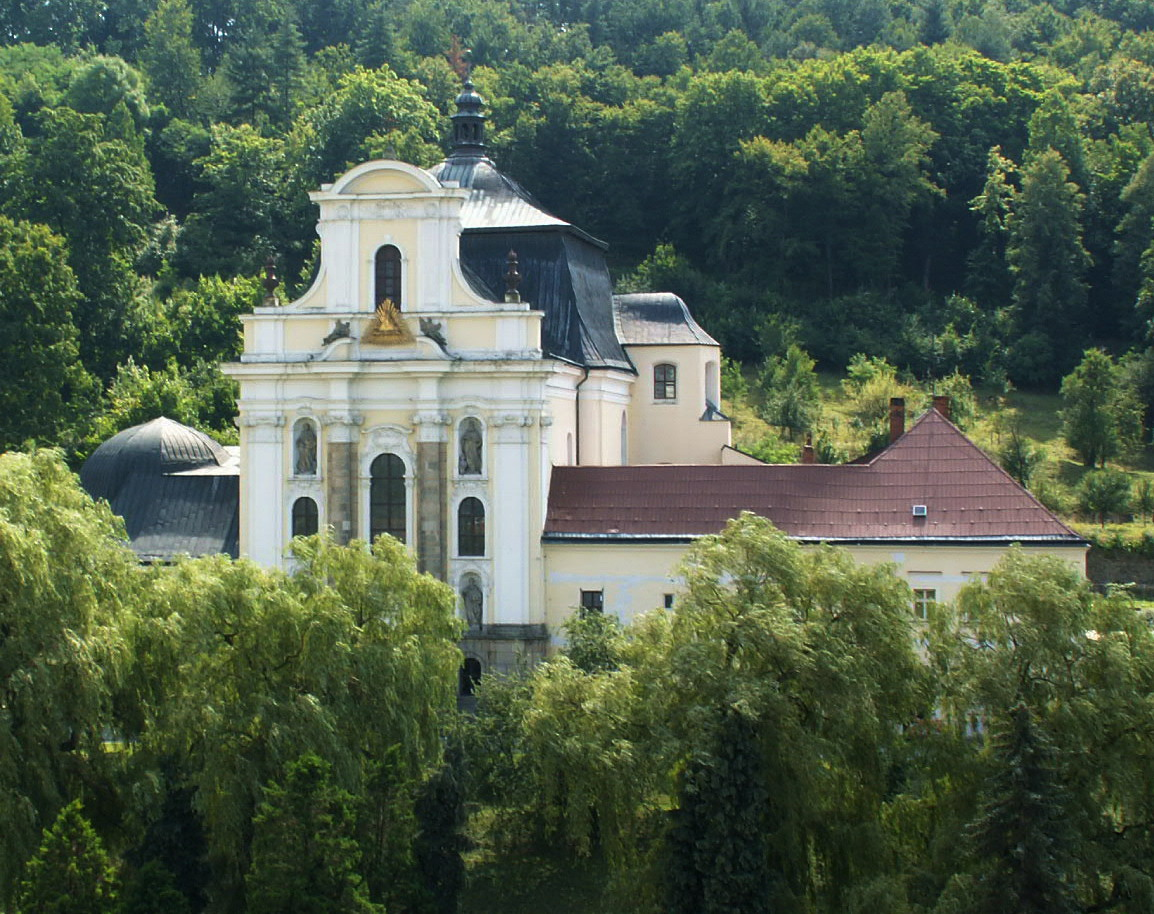
- North view of the church and rectory
- Church of the Holy Trinity
- Location: Kostelní 111, Fulnek
- Country: Czech Republic
- Denomination: Roman Catholic
- Website: farnostfulnek.cz

History
- Founded: 1760
- Founder(s): Joseph Barwig, CRSA

Architecture
- Architect: Nikolaus Thalherr

Administration
- Province: Moravia
- Diocese: Diocese of Ostrava-Opava
- Parish: Fulnek

The Church of the Holy Trinity (Czech: kostel Nejsvětější Trojice) is a Roman Catholic parish church in Fulnek, Czech Republic. Built in the 18th century, it is architecturally and culturally significant as one of the most valuable Baroque buildings of northeast Moravia. It is situated on the site of the original parish church, whose existence was documented in the 13th century.

The new church was constructed in response to a growing cult of devotion around the local portrait of the Blessed Virgin Mary. It is believed by some that the portrait shed tears and that several people were miraculously cured after praying in front of the portrait.

The architect of the church was Nikolaus Thalherr. Its interior was decorated with ceiling frescos by Joseph Ignatz Sadler, and with paintings by Ignác Viktorin Raab and Felix Ivo Leicher. Other artists have worked on various features of the church.

== History ==
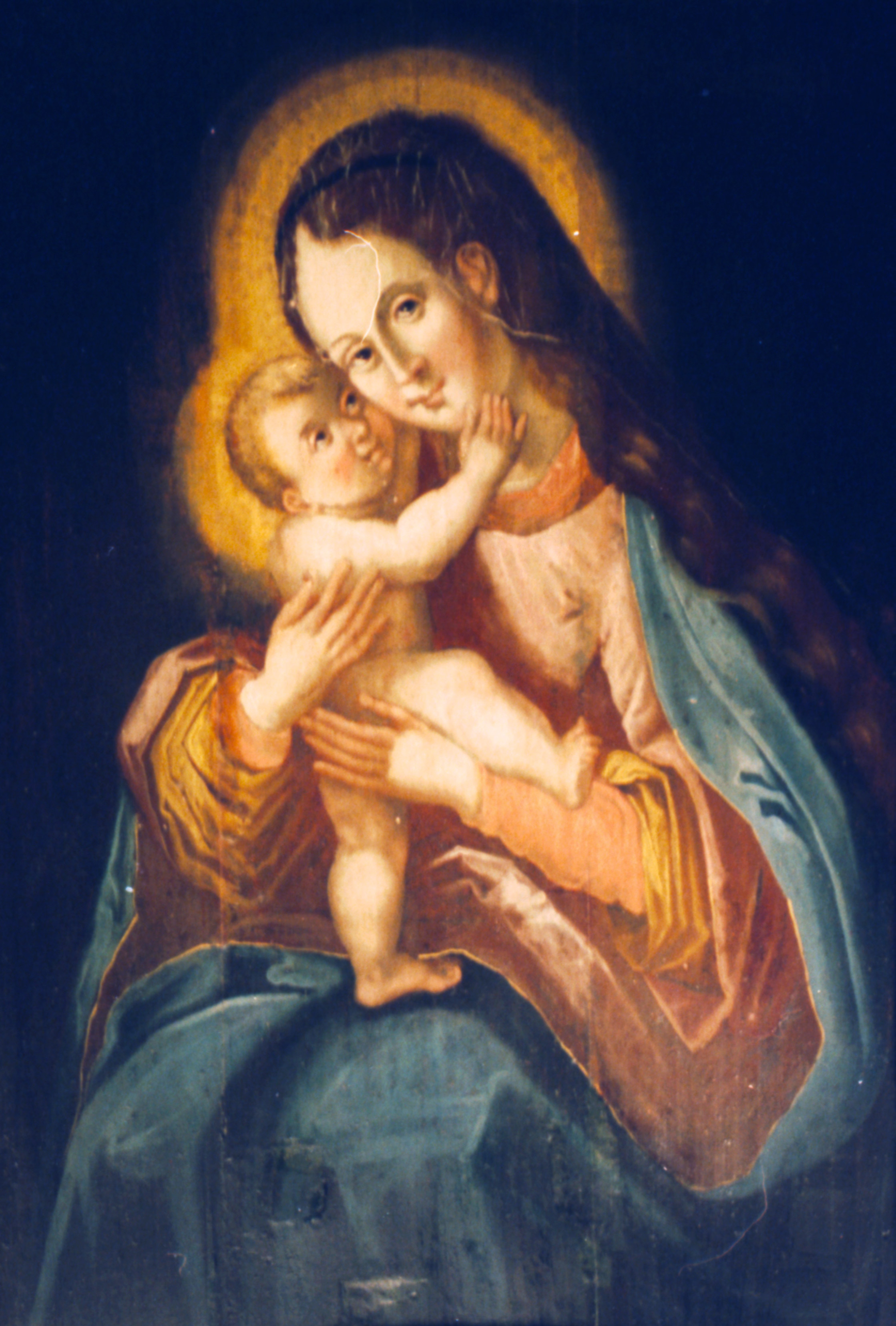
The miraculous portrait of The Virgin Mary of Fulnek

=== Original church ===
The original church of the Fulnek parish stood in the place of today's chapel of St. Joseph. The date of its construction is unknown, but it was first mentioned in 1293 in a contract of Oldřich of Lichtenburk, owner of the Fulnek domain, when he sold the Fulnek's office of mayor to Štědroň Jílovec. In 1389, an augustinian monastery was founded in Fulnek and the old church was given to them by Nicolaus of Rýzmburk, the bishop of Olomouc. Another mention of the original Fulnek church comes from 1416, when the first Land Hejtman of Moravia Lacek I of Kravaře was buried here. The monastery was burnt down and rebuilt multiple times in its history. First time in 1429, when Fulnek was set on fire by Jan of Tovačov, second time in 1559, third time the church was sacked and set on fire by the Swedish army marching through Fulnek in 1657, fourth time in 1676, and the last time was in 1695.

=== Cult of the miraculous painting ===
The cult around the painting of Virgin Mary of Fulnek began to form after 1746. The belief that the painting sheds tears began to spread in 1749 and it started to draw crowds. A small wooden chapel for the painting was replaced by a brick-and-mortar chapel in 1750. The chapel was not enough and a decision was made to build a new bigger church instead. The author of the design was Nikolaus Thalherr, an architect based in Fulnek, who is also credited with building the churches in Budišov nad Budišovkou and Šternberk.

=== Building of the new church ===
The foundation stone of the new church was laid on 19 October 1750. It can be seen today under the pulpit and the inscription with the year 1750 is still noticeable. The church was consecrated on 22 October 1760 by Jan of Schärffenberg, the auxiliary bishop of Olomouc. Since then the church has not undergone any major constructional overhaul, only two renovations from 1900 to 1903 and from 1950 to 1983.

== Interior ==
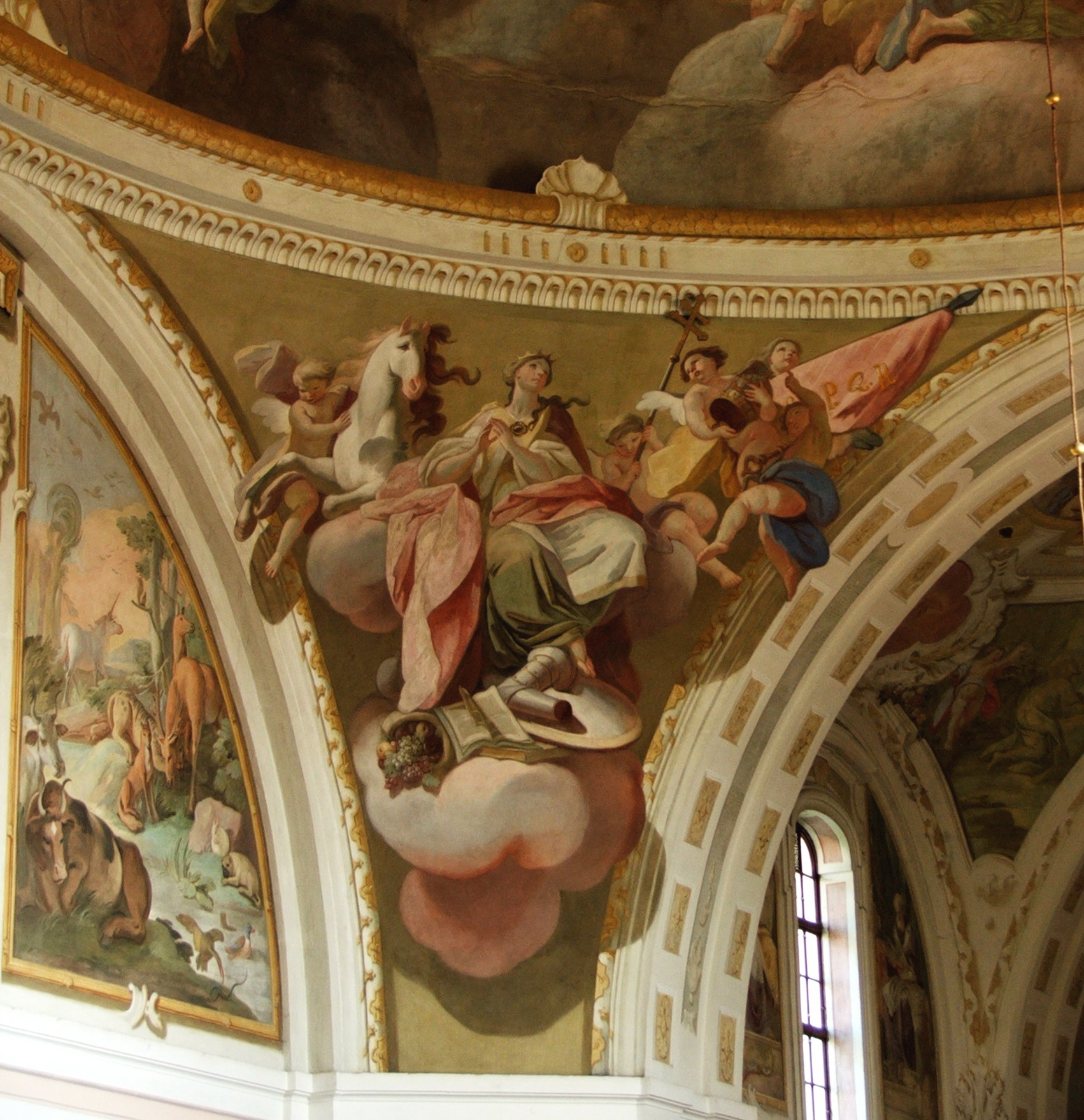
Allegory of Europe (1760) – fresco by J. I. Sadler

The miraculous portrait of The Virgin Mary of Fulnek is placed above the tabernacle on the main altar. It was gifted to the church by Mudrák family to commemorate the premature death of their two sons in 1678. Originally, it was placed on the outer wall of the monastery. The local sacristan Josef Hopp recorded 106 instances of pilgrims claiming to receive God's help after praying in front of the picture. The church is decorated by frescoes from the Olomouc painter Joseph Ignatz Sadler. Paintings hung on the walls and side altars were created by a jesuit painter Ignác Viktorin Raab. The painting on the main altar was painted by Felix Ivo Leicher – a pupil of Franz Anton Maulbertsch and a native of the nearby town of Bílovec. It shows Saint Augustine holding a pen that is leaving a fiery trace behind, which symbolizes his inspiration from the Holy Spirit. The main motif of the culprit's decoration are the three virtues represented by three women: Hope on the left, Faith in the middle and Love on the right.
