= Jakub Seidler =

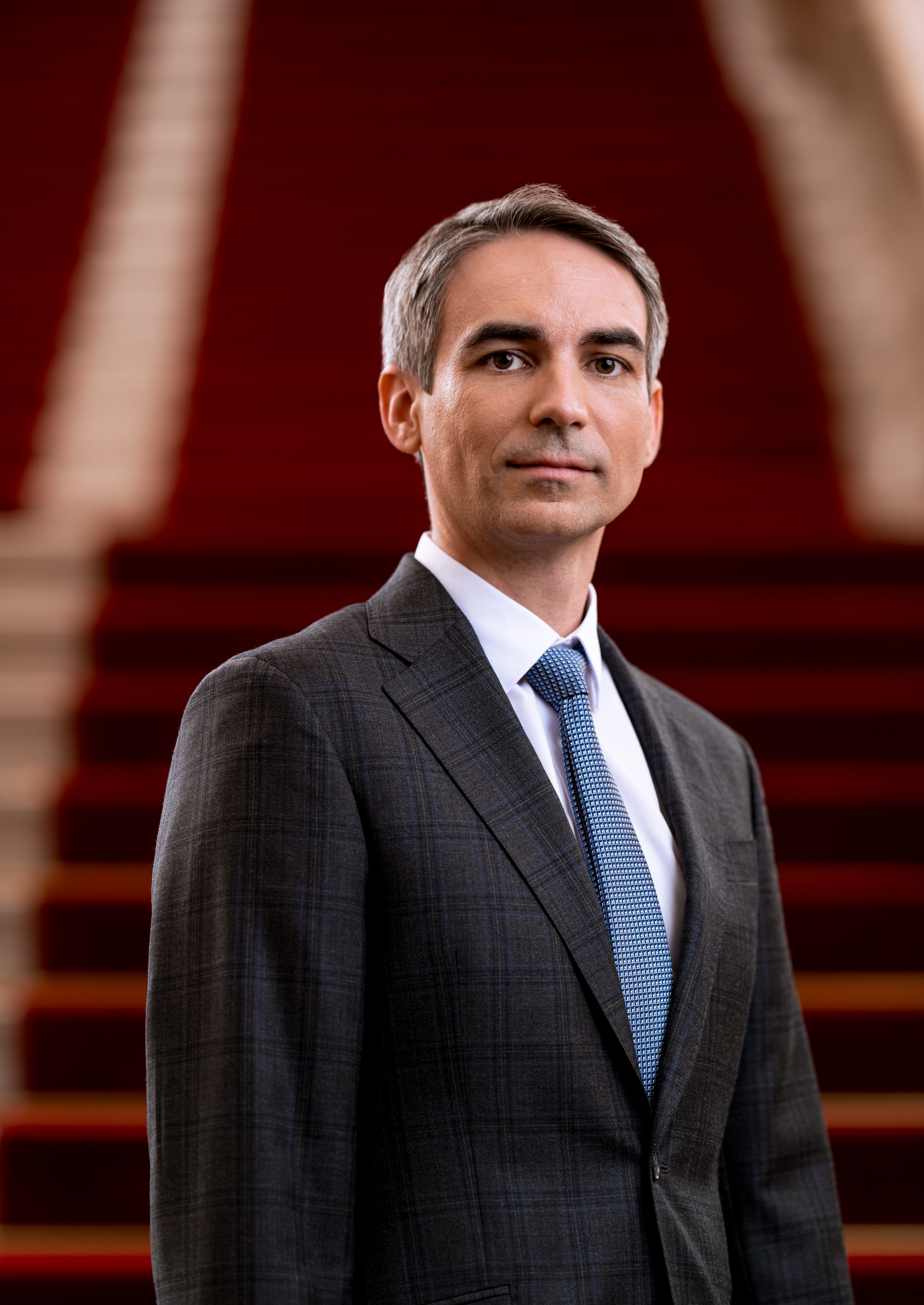

Member of the Bank Board of the Czech National Bank
- Incumbent
- Assumed office 1 December 2024

Personal details
- Born: 3 September 1983 (age 43) Bílovec, Czechoslovakia
- Education: Institute of Economic Studies, Charles University

Jakub Seidler (born 3 September 1983) is a Czech economist and a member of the Bank Board of the Czech National Bank. From 2014 to 2021, he served as Chief Economist at ING Bank Czech Republic, and from 2021 to 2024 as Chief Economist of the Czech Banking Association.

== Early life and education ==
Seidler was born on 3 September 1983 in Bílovec. He graduated from the mathematics programme at Mikuláš Koperník Grammar School in Bílovec and studied economics at the Institute of Economic Studies, Faculty of Social Sciences, Charles University in Prague, graduating in 2008. He later earned a PhD from the same institute. During his studies, he spent a semester at Humboldt University in Berlin.

== Career ==
From 2008 to 2014, Jakub Seidler worked at the Czech National Bank in departments focused on financial stability, research, and monetary policy. As head of the macroprudential policy unit, he was responsible for stress testing the banking sector and conducting financial stability analyses. He completed international courses on econometrics, financial stability, and monetary policy at institutions such as the IMF, the European Central Bank, and the Bank of England.

From 2014 to 2021, he was Chief Economist at ING Bank Czech Republic, focusing on macroeconomic analysis, financial market developments, and monetary and fiscal policy forecasts.

In 2018, he was appointed by the Government of the Czech Republic to the Committee for Budgetary Forecasts, where he served until 2024, when he was appointed to the Bank Board.

From 2021 to 2024, he served as Chief Economist of the Czech Banking Association, overseeing economic and financial analyses and producing regular macroeconomic forecasts. He became a frequently cited expert in Czech media, commenting on the domestic economy, monetary policy, credit markets, and interest rates. He also led the implementation and publication of statistics tracking the mortgage market.

On 30 October 2024, Czech President Petr Pavel appointed him to the Bank Board of the Czech National Bank for a six-year term starting on 1 December 2024.

== Academic work and publications ==
Jakub Seidler is the author or co-author of numerous academic studies published in Czech and international journals and working papers. His research focuses on financial stability, banking, and macroprudential policy, including topics such as bank liquidity creation, the effects of Basel III regulation, excessive credit growth, and countercyclical capital buffers.

=== Selected Publications ===
- Horváth, R., Seidler, J., & Weill, L. (2016). How bank competition influences liquidity creation. Economic Modelling.
- Geršl, A., & Seidler, J. (2015). Countercyclical capital buffers and credit-to-GDP gaps: Simulation for Central, Eastern, and Southeastern Europe. Eastern European Economics.
- Horváth, R., Seidler, J., & Weill, L. (2014). Bank capital and liquidity creation: Granger-causality evidence. Journal of Financial Services Research.
- Geršl, A., & Seidler, J. (2010). Excessive credit growth as an indicator of financial (in)stability and its use in macroprudential policy. CNB Financial Stability Report.
