= Miloš Holaň =

Czech ice hockey player

- Born: April 22, 1971 (age 55) Bílovec, Czechoslovakia
- Height: 5 ft 11 in (180 cm)
- Weight: 191 lb (87 kg; 13 st 9 lb)
- Position: Defence
- Shot: Left
- Played for: Philadelphia Flyers; Mighty Ducks of Anaheim
- National team: Czechoslovakia and Czech Republic
- NHL draft: 77th overall, 1993; Philadelphia Flyers
- Playing career: 1989–1995; 1998–2000

Miloš Holaň (born April 22, 1971) is a Czech retired professional ice hockey player and currently the head coach of HC Nové Zámky in the Tipos Extraliga, the first tier in Slovakia. He played 49 games in the National Hockey League (NHL) between 1993 and 1996 with the Philadelphia Flyers and Mighty Ducks of Anaheim, as well as several seasons in the Czechoslovak and Czech Extraliga. Internationally Holaň played for the Czechoslovak national junior team at two World Junior Championships, and with the Czech Republic at two World Championships. After retiring in 2000 he turned to coaching, and has worked for multiple teams across Europe.

== Playing career ==
Holaň began his career with TJ Vítkovice in the then-Czechoslovak First Ice Hockey League. Following two seasons with Dukla Trenčín as part of mandatory army service, Holaň returned to Vítkovice. In the final Czechoslovak Extraliga season before the dissolution of the country, Holaň broke through with an unprecedented season for a defenceman - in 53 games that season (counting both the regular season and the play-offs), he scored 35 goals and tallied 68 points, winning him the Golden Hockey Stick as the league's best player.

Holaň was drafted 77th overall by the Philadelphia Flyers in the 1993 NHL entry draft. Along with the Flyers he played in the National Hockey League for the Mighty Ducks of Anaheim and in total played 49 regular season games, scoring 5 goals and 11 assists for 16 points and collecting 42 penalty minutes. The end of Holaň's NHL career came prematurely in 1995 following diagnosis of chronic myelogenous leukemia, prompting his retirement, but he returned three years later to play in parts of two Czech Extraliga seasons with Vítkovice and HC Oceláři Třinec, as well as five games for EHC Freiburg in Germany's second tier, before retiring again at the age of 29.

== Career statistics ==
=== Regular season and playoffs ===
			Regular season					Playoffs
Season	Team	League	GP	G	A	Pts	PIM	GP	G	A	Pts	PIM
1985–86	TJ Vítkovice	TCH U18	30	10	3	13	—	—	—	—	—	—
1986–87	HC Vítkovice U18	TCH U18	34	36	11	47	—	—	—	—	—	—
1988–89	TJ Vítkovice	TCH	7	0	0	0	0	—	—	—	—	—
1989–90	TJ Vítkovice	TCH	50	8	8	16	—	—	—	—	—	—
1990–91	ASVŠ Dukla Trenčín	TCH	24	2	12	14	—	—	—	—	—	—
1991–92	ASVŠ Dukla Trenčín	TCH	51	13	22	35	—	—	—	—	—	—
1992–93	TJ Vítkovice	TCH	53	35	33	68	60	—	—	—	—	—
1993–94	Philadelphia Flyers	NHL	8	1	1	2	4	—	—	—	—	—
1993–94	Hershey Bears	AHL	27	7	22	29	16	—	—	—	—	—
1993–94	HC Vítkovice	CZE	—	—	—	—	—	5	2	1	3	6
1994–95	Mighty Ducks of Anaheim	NHL	25	2	8	10	14	—	—	—	—	—
1994–95	Hershey Bears	AHL	55	22	27	49	75	—	—	—	—	—
1995–96	Mighty Ducks of Anaheim	NHL	16	2	2	4	24	—	—	—	—	—
1998–99	HC Vítkovice	CZE	30	9	13	22	26	4	0	2	2	12
1999–00	HC Oceláři Třinec	CZE	11	1	5	6	6	—	—	—	—	—
1999–00	EHC Freiburg	GER-2	5	1	3	4	16	—	—	—	—	—
TCH/CZE totals			207	65	85	150	92	—	—	—	—	—
NHL totals			49	5	11	16	42	—	—	—	—	—

=== International ===
Medal record

Representing Czechoslovakia

Men's ice hockey

European Junior Championships
Silver medal – second place	1989 Soviet Union	

World Junior Championships
Bronze medal – third place	1990 Finland	
Bronze medal – third place	1991 Canada	

Representing Czech Republic

World Championships
Bronze medal – third place	1993 Germany	

Year	Team	Event	GP	G	A	Pts	PIM
1989	Czechoslovakia	EJC	6	4	4	8	6
1990	Czechoslovakia	WJC	4	2	0	2	2
1991	Czechoslovakia	WJC	6	0	2	2	0
1993	Czech Republic	WC	8	1	3	4	10
1994	Czech Republic	WC	6	0	3	3	8
Junior totals			16	6	6	12	8
Senior totals			14	1	6	7	18

Awards
Preceded by Róbert Švehla	Golden Hockey Stick; 1993	Succeeded by Roman Turek
