= Johann Ignaz Cimbal =

Austrian painter and etcher

- Born: 1722; Wagstadt
- Died: 27 December 1795 (aged 72–73)
- Occupation: Austrian painter

Johann Ignaz Cimbal (1722 – 27 December 1795) was an Austrian painter and etcher, who produced many altarpieces and frescoes for churches, monasteries and other Church buildings. He painted many works in Bohemia, Moravia, Silesia, Vienna and Hungary.

== Life ==
He was born in Wagstadt in Moravian-Silesian Region as son of Matthias Zimbal and his wife Anna and attended the Academy of Fine Arts, Vienna from 1742 until he graduated in 1753. He may have been a foundling at the Brothers of Charity and also may have been taught some painting before 1742; documentary evidence is scant. Cimbal became friends with the painter Felix Ivo Leicher and the sculptor Raymond Sieß, whom he may have met in Vienna. Sieß sponsored some of Cimbal's children at their baptisms.

He decorated many churches and monasteries for the Hospitaller Order of St. John of God in Brno and Feldsberg, working alongside other painters Johann Jablonský and Ignaz Mayer the Elder.

== Family ==
He married in 23 November 1760 Maria Clara Josefa Oblasser, a daughter of the painter Joseph Oblasser (1707–1746) and his wife Maria Anna Mansberg. The two had many children, but only two sons and two daughters survived their father. Both sons were painters: Jakob (born 7 January 1778 in Vienna, died 24 January 1834 in Vienna) was at the Vienna Academy in 1796 and he was recorded as an "academic painter" in 1823 in Leopoldstadt, and Johann (born 1754, died after 1808 in Vienna). Both sons assisted their father with his work, as was usual for the time.

== Reputation ==
In his lifetime, Cimbal was in demand as a painter, and his clients were satisfied with his work. Since his death, however, he has been less adulated: his works have been described as dry and sourced from a limited inventory, and his detailing sometimes clumsy. His earlier work is looked on somewhat more kindly than his later work. Some details suggest that he was gifted, but that he worked in disharmony with his workshop and assistants. Modern critics have called him a "typical provincial painter", at odds with his training as a painter from the Vienna Academy.
