= The VIZE 97 Prize =

VIZE 97 Prize
- Description: Awarded to significant thinkers crossing traditional scientific frameworks
- Country: Czech Republic
- Presented by: Dagmar and Václav Havel Foundation VIZE 97
- Reward: Crosier of St. Adalbert of Prague
- Website: http://www.vize.cz/en/prize.php

The VIZE 97 Prize (also The Vision 97 Award; in Czech: Cena Nadace Dagmar a Václava Havlových VIZE 97) is an international prize awarded to significant thinkers by the Dagmar and Václav Havel Foundation VIZE 97 (Nadace Dagmar a Václava Havlových VIZE 97). Starting in 1999, it has been awarded annually to people who through their work "cross the traditional framework of scientific knowledge, contribute to the understanding of science as an integral part of general culture, and in an unconventional way deal with the fundamental questions of knowledge, being and human existence." The prize is awarded in Prague, Czech Republic, and the laureates receive the "crosier of St. Adalbert of Prague."

== Laureates ==
Year	Laureate		Nationality and profession
1999		Karl H. Pribram	American neurosurgeon, psychologist and psychiatrist
2000		Umberto Eco	Italian semiotician, philosopher, literary critic and novelist
2001		Zdeněk Neubauer	Czech philosopher and biologist
2002		Joseph Weizenbaum	American computer scientist and thinker of German origin
2003		Robert B. Reich	American economist
2004		Petr Vopěnka	Czech mathematician and philosopher
2005		Philip Zimbardo	American psychologist
2006		Zygmunt Bauman	Polish sociologist
2007		Stanislav Grof	American psychologist and psychiatrist of Czech origin
2008		Julia Kristeva	Bulgarian-French philosopher, literary critic, psychoanalyst
2009		Václav Cílek	Czech geologist and writer
2010	—	Konrad Paul Liessmann	Austrian philosopher and literary theorist
2011	—	Iva Mojžišová	Slovak art theorist
2012		Miloslav Petrusek	Czech sociologist (in memoriam)
2013	—	Jiří Fiala	Czech mathematician and analytic philosopher (in memoriam)
2014	—	Andrew Lass	American anthropologist
2015		Timothy Snyder	American historian
2016		Jan Sokol	Czech philosopher
2017		N. David Mermin	American physicist
2018		Josef Jařab	Czech professor of American Literature, literary critic, translator, former Czech senator, former president of Palacký University and Central European University
2019		Martin Bútora	Slovak sociologist, writer and diplomat
2020		Ivan Chvatík	Czech philosopher
2021	—	Coronavirus pandemic helpers	Thousands of unknown people on the front lines against the disease
2022		Alena and Petr Hadrav	Czech scientific writers and translators in the field of astronomy
2023		John Lennox	Irish mathematician, writer and debater on the role of religion in contemporary civilization
2024		Miroslav Petříček	Czech philosopher and theoretician of fine arts
2025		Eva Jiřičná	Czech architect and designer
