= Tsymbal =

Tsymbal or Tsimbal (Ukrainian: Цимбал; Russian: Цымбал or Цимбал) is a surname. Notable people with the surname include:

- Bogdan Tsymbal (born 1997), Ukrainian biathlete
- Kostiantyn Tsymbal (born 1993), Ukrainian karateka
- Mykola Tsymbal (born 1984), Ukrainian footballer
- Nikolai Tsymbal (1925–2020), Soviet military officer
- Yevgeni Tsimbal (born 1986), Russian footballer

== See also ==
- Cimbal
- Tsymbalar
- Tsymbalyuk
- Zimbalist
