= Bílovka =

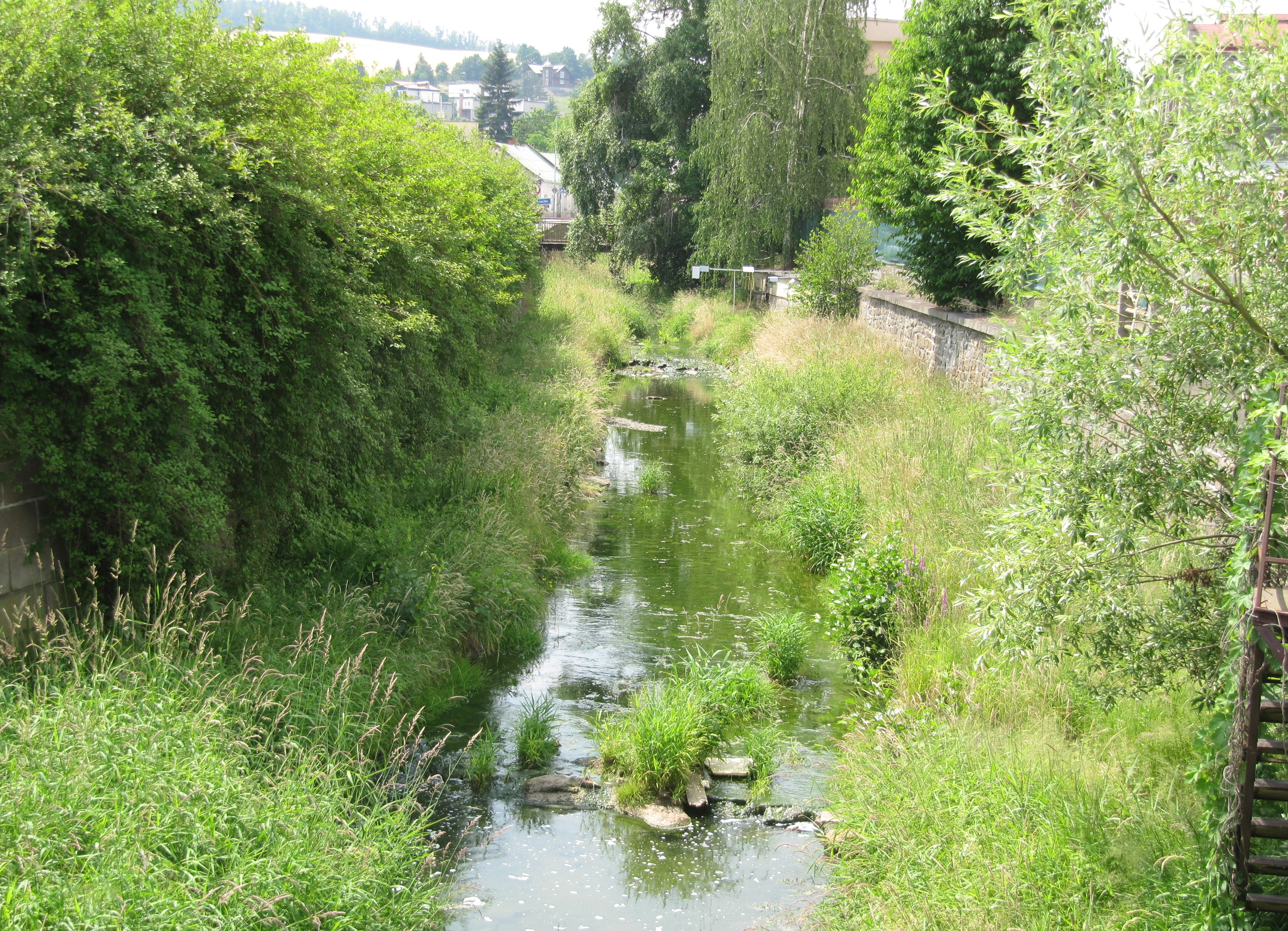
- The Bílovka in Bílovec

Location
- Country: Czech Republic
- Region: Moravian-Silesian

Physical characteristics
- Source
  - location: Skřipov, Nízký Jeseník
  - coordinates: 49°47′33″N 17°54′28″E
  - elevation: 498 m (1,634 ft)
- Mouth
  - location: Oder
  - coordinates: 49°43′35″N 18°8′4″E
  - elevation: 223 m (732 ft)
- Length: 23.7 km (14.7 mi)
- Basin size: 137.3 km^{2} (53.0 sq mi)
- Discharge
  - average: 0.75 m^{3}/s (26 cu ft/s) near estuary

Basin features
- Progression: Oder→ Baltic Sea

The Bílovka is a stream in the Czech Republic, a left tributary of the Oder River. It flows through the Moravian-Silesian Region. It is 23.7 km (14.7 mi) long.

== Etymology ==
The stream is named after the town of Bílovec.

== Characteristic ==
The Bílovka originates in the territory of Skřipov in the Nízký Jeseník range at an elevation of 498 m (1,634 ft) and flows to Studénka, where it enters the Oder River at an elevation of 223 m (732 ft). It is 23.7 km (14.7 mi) long. Its drainage basin has an area of 137.3 km^{2} (53.0 sq mi).

The longest tributaries of the Bílovka are:

Tributary	Length (km)	Side
Sezina	18.5	left
Břízka	5.7	left

== Course ==
The stream flows through the municipal territories of Skřipov, Bílovec, Velké Albrechtice, Jistebník and Studénka.

== Nature ==
The lower course of the stream flows through the Poodří Protected Landscape Area. The stream is mainly inhabited by Cyprinidae species of fish.

== Bridges ==
In 2006–2009, a bridge carrying the D1 motorway was built across the Bílovka, Jamník and Sezina watercourses at their confluence.

== See also ==
- List of rivers of the Czech Republic
