= Miloslav Petrusek =

Czech sociologist

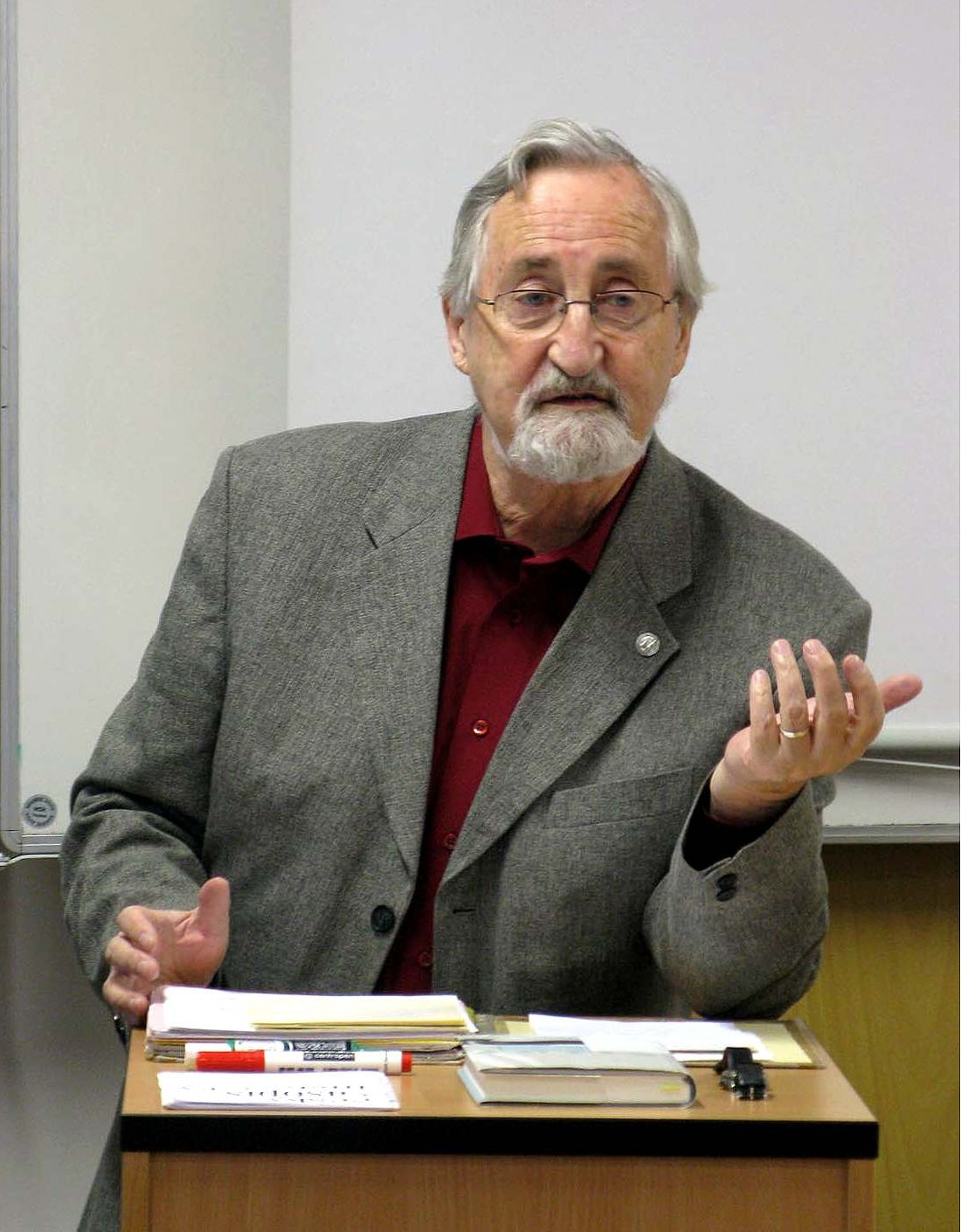

Prorector for Academic Affairs, Charles University in Prague
- In office 1997–2000

Dean of Faculty of Social Sciences, Charles University in Prague
- In office 1992–1997
- Preceded by: Čestmír Suchý
- Succeeded by: Lubomír Mlčoch

Personal details
- Born: 15 September 1936 Zlín, Czechoslovakia
- Died: 19 August 2012 (aged 75) Prague, Czech Republic
- Citizenship: Czech
- Education: Masaryk University
- Awards: The VIZE 97 Prize (in memoriam)
- Website: www.petrusek.cz

Miloslav Petrusek (15 September 1936 – 19 August 2012) was a prominent Czech sociologist who served as a dean of Faculty of Social Sciences at Charles University in Prague between 1992 and 1997, as well as the prorector for academic affairs of the university in 1997–2000. For his consistent contribution to sociology and education, he received numerous awards, such as Ordre des Palmes Académiques or Golden Medal of Masaryk University. In 2012, Petrusek received The VIZE 97 Prize (in memoriam).

Petrusek is one of the three founders of the Václav Havel Library together with former First Lady of the Czech Republic and wife of Václav Havel, Dagmar Havlová and former Czech Minister of Foreign Affairs, Karel Schwarzenberg.

== Biography ==
=== Before 1989 ===
Petrusek studied philosophy and history between 1954 and 1959 at Masaryk University in Brno. He wrote his thesis on "World view of Tomáš Garrigue Masaryk" and Masaryk's contribution to sociology became one of Petrusek's lifelong interests. After an obligatory army service (1959–1961), Petrusek became a professor of philosophy and formal logic at Pedagogical Institute in Zlín (Gottwaldov at the time), but actively worked in sociology, a limited field in 1950s Czechoslovakia. During short time of liberalization, the Prague Spring, Petrusek earned his doctoral degree (1966) and worked at the Institute of Social-Political Sciences at Charles University. During this time, under the lead of another prominent Czech sociologist of that time, Pavel Machonin, Petrusek co-authored probably the most important work of sociology in communist Czechoslovakia till that time, "Československá společnost - Sociologická analýza sociální stratifikace" (Czechoslovak society - sociological analysis of social stratification), as well as "Malý sociologický slovník" (Small sociological dictionary) for which he prepared numerous entries.

Shortly after 1968 Warsaw Pact invasion of Czechoslovakia, in 1970, Petrusek was expelled from the communist party and banned by the communist regime from publishing and actively pursuing research during the whole period of normalization until the end of communism in 1989, except one book, the Introduction to Study of Sociology, a textbook published in 200 copies by Charles University. Under these circumstances, he worked within a frame of "alternative sociology", based on analysing literature as well as performing arts, which, combined with his deep knowledge of classical and contemporary sociology. He used this approach to analyse social themes in former Czechoslovak society such as gender, social stratification, problematics of higher education as well as (at that time) approaching post-communist times without access to the usual tools of sociological research.

=== After 1989 ===
Soon after the Velvet Revolution in 1989, Petrusek habilitated himself as a Docent of Sociology (1990) at Faculty of Philosophy, Charles University. During an attempt of dissolution of Faculty of Journalism, which was heavily controlled by communists, Petrusek persuaded the rector of the university, Radim Palouš, to attempt to transform the faculty into modern educational institution, the present Faculty of Social Sciences. Later on, Petrusek served as a dean for two terms between 1992 and 1997, after which he was one of the 10 prorectors of the university in 1997–2000. During these later years of his life, Petrusek published and re-published large collection of materials that were previously released semi-officially in samizdat, as well as a number of new works both in theoretical sociology, as well as textbooks of practical sociological methods and history of sociology. One of his last monographies, "Societies of late time" (Společnosti pozdní doby), contemplates the state of (not only) Czech society and strives to "answer the question in which society we live in".

== Bibliography ==
- P. Machonin a kol. Československá společnost - Sociologická analýza sociální stratifikace (Czechoslovak society - sociological analysis of social stratification). Epocha, Bratislava 1969 (co-author)
- Sociometrie - teorie, metoda, techniky (Sociometry - theory, method, techniques). Svoboda, Prague 1969
- Malý sociologický slovník. (Small sociological dictionary). Svoboda, Praha 1970; Bratislava 1970 (editor an author of multiple entries)
- Alternativa - Úvahy o postavení sociologie v nealternativní společnosti (Alternative - Reflections on role of sociology in alternative-less society) - under pseudonym Petr Grňa, published in samizdat, 1986; officially published in KOS, Praha 1992. ISBN 80-901093-5-7
- Sociologie a literatura. (Sociology and literature). Čs. spisovatel, Praha 1990.
- Il postcomunismo come concetto e problema sociopolitico. In: V. Bělohradský, P. Kende e J. Rupnik (eds.), Democrazie da inventare. Culture politiche e stato in Ungheria e Cecoslovacchia. Torino: Fondazione Giovanni Agnelli 1991, s. 71–88. ISBN 88-7860-051-2
- Teorie a metoda v moderní sociologii. (Theory and methods in modern sociology). Karolinum, Praha 1993. ISBN 80-7066-799-0
- Sociologické školy, směry, paradigmata. (Sociological schools, movements and paradigms). SLON, Praha 1994.
- Sociologie, literatura a politika. (Sociology, literature and politics). Karolinum, Praha 1996.
- Velký sociologický slovník. (Big sociological dictionary). Karolinum, Praha 1996.
- Dyskusja postmodernistyczna w Czechach lat dziewięćdziesiątych. In: Hudzik, Jan P. – Mizińska, Jadwiga (eds.), Pamięć, mięjsce, obecność. Współczesne refleksje nad kulturą i ich implikacje pedagogiczne. Lublin: Wydawnictwo UMCS 1997, s. 187–196. ISBN 83-227-0969-2
- Zur Mythologie der Massenkultur in den postkommunistischen Gesellschaften. Eine soziologische Reflexion. In: Ivo Bock, Wolfgang Schlott, Hartmute Trepper (koncepce a redakce), Kommerz, Kunst, Unterhaltung. Die neue Popularkultur in Zentral- und Osteuropa. Bremen: Edition Temmen 2002, s. 23–50. ISBN 3-86108-345-0
- Společnosti pozdní doby. (Societies of late time) SLON, Praha 2006, 459 pages, 339 Kč, ISBN 80-86429-63-6.
- Dějiny sociologie. (History of Sociology). Praha: Grada 2011, 236 pages, co-authors: Jan Balon, Tomáš Holeček, Michal Kotík, Jan Maršálek, Miroslav Paulíček a Marta Svobodová. ISBN 978-80-247-3234-3
- České sociální vědy v exilu. (Czech social sciences in exile). Praha: Sociologické nakladatelství (SLON) 2011, 291 pages. ISBN 978-80-7419-064-3
- Lifestyle in the Age of Liquid Modernity or the Consciousness of Necessity – Life in a Society of Keen Senses. In: Helena Kubátová et al., Ways of Life in the Late Modernity. Olomouc: Palacký University 2013, pp. 35–39. ISBN 978-80-244-3450-6 (posthumously)
