= Johann Christoph Handke =

Johann Christoph Handke (Czech: Jan Kryštof Handke; 18 February 1694 in Rýmařov – 31 December 1774 in Olomouc) was a Baroque painter from Moravia. He was the brother-in-law of the painter Joseph Ignatz Sadler, who studied with Handke from 1738, and completed several frescoes with Handke during his career. He made frescos as well as oil paintings.

== Works ==
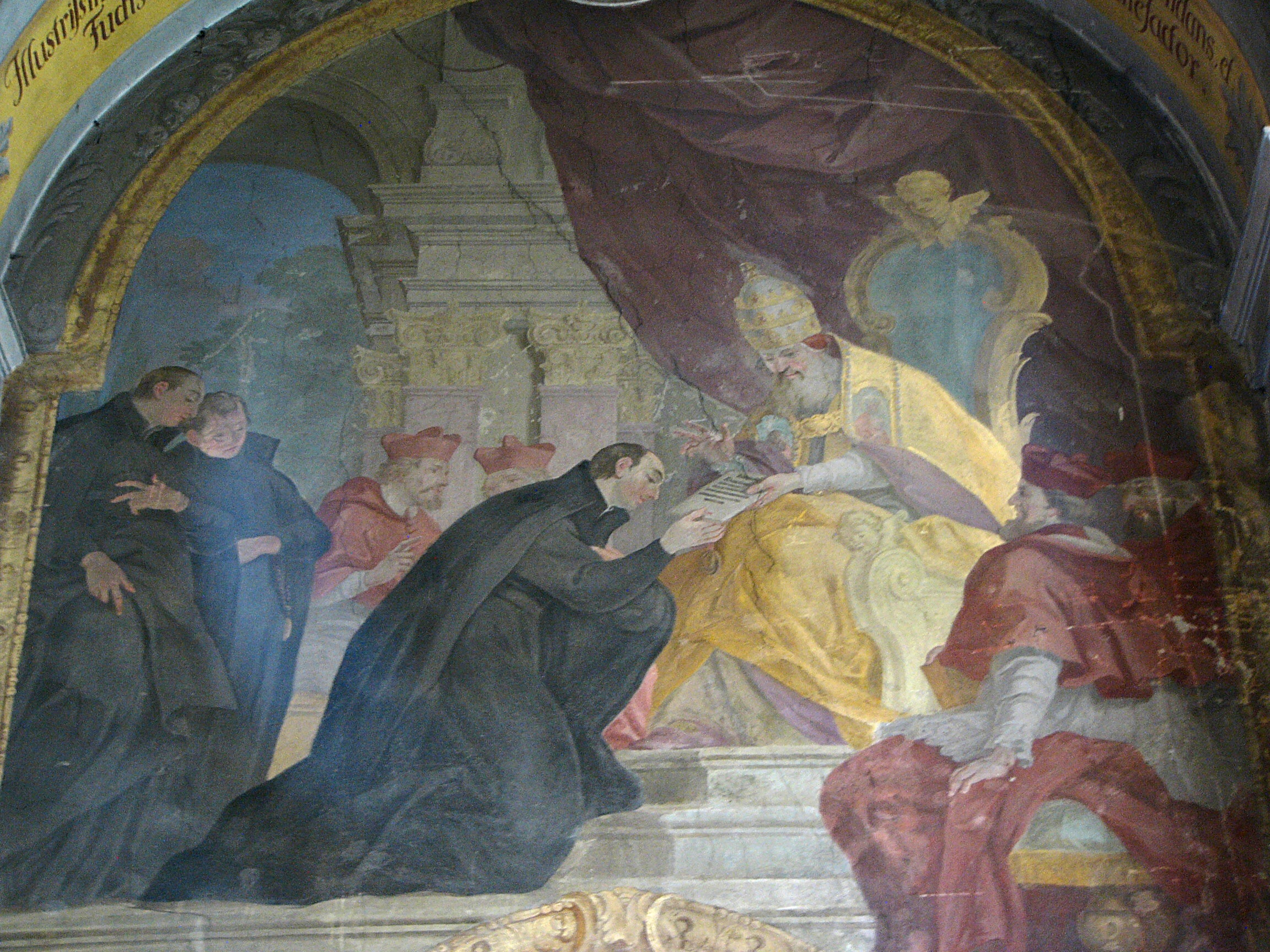
Fresco of Approving of bylaw of Society of Jesus depicting Ignatius of Loyola receiving papal bull Regimini militantis Ecclesiae from Pope Paul III, painted in Church of Our Lady of the Snow in Olomouc after 1743

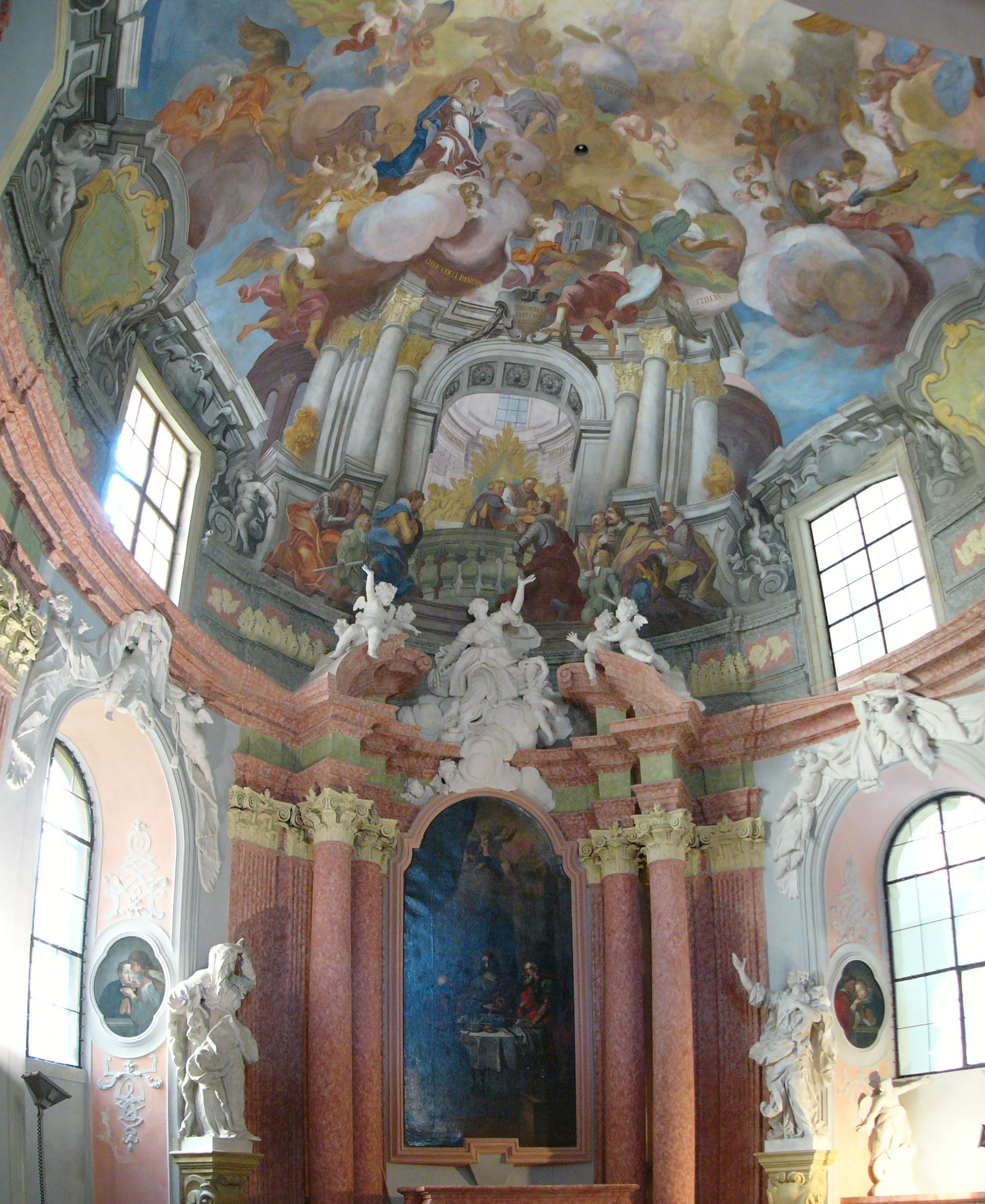
Illusionistic ceiling painting in Chapel of Corpus Christi in Olomouc

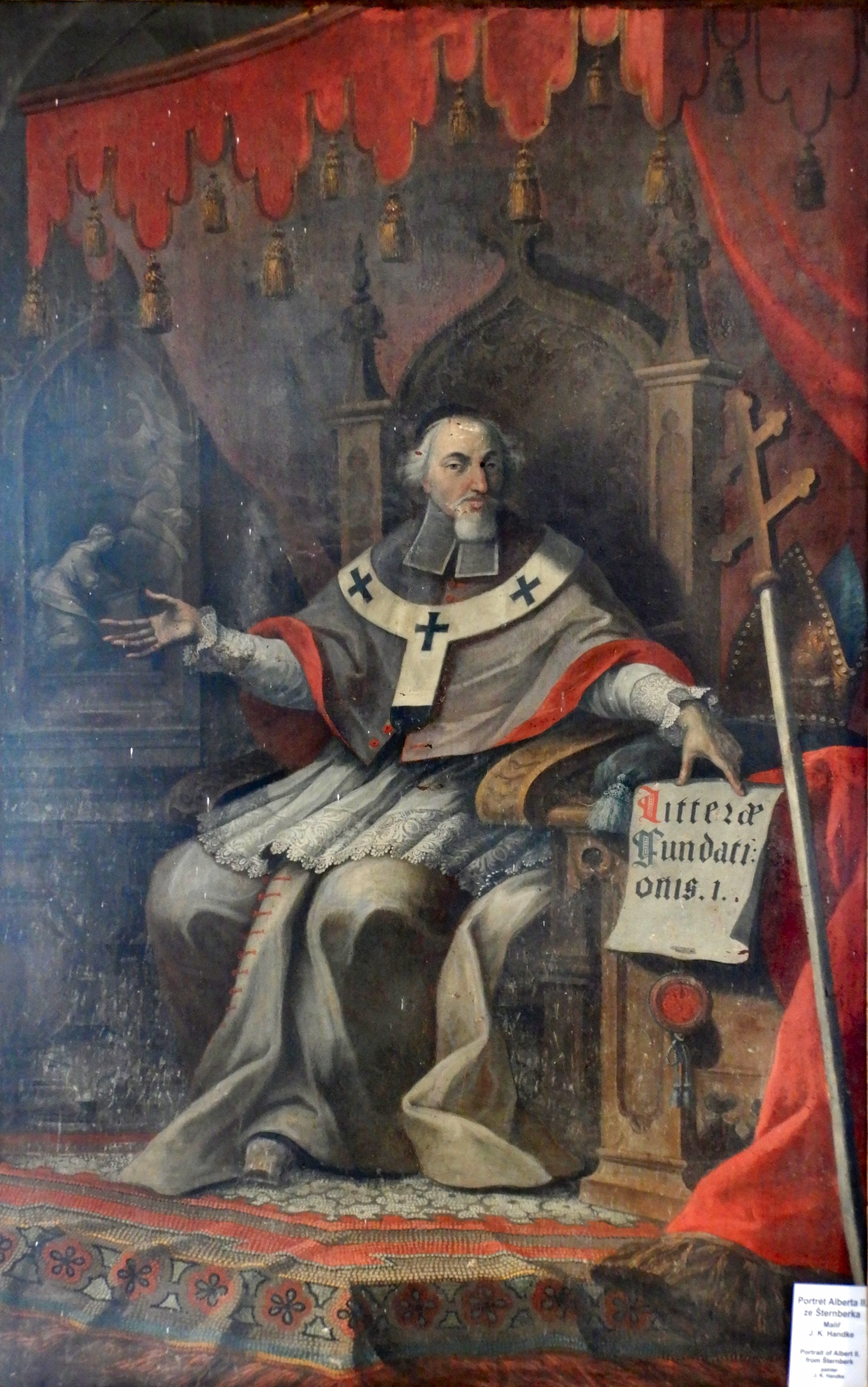
Oil painting of Albrecht von Sternberg in Augustinian monastery in Šternberk
