= Cimbal =

Cimbal is a Slavic surname literally meaning cimbalom in several languages. Notable people with the surname include:

- Johann Ignaz Cimbal, Austrian painter and etcher
- Suzana Cimbal Špirelja, Croatian sport shooter
- Tibor Cimbal, Serbian footballer

== See also ==
- Tsymbal
- Tsymbalar
