= Rýmařov =

- Town
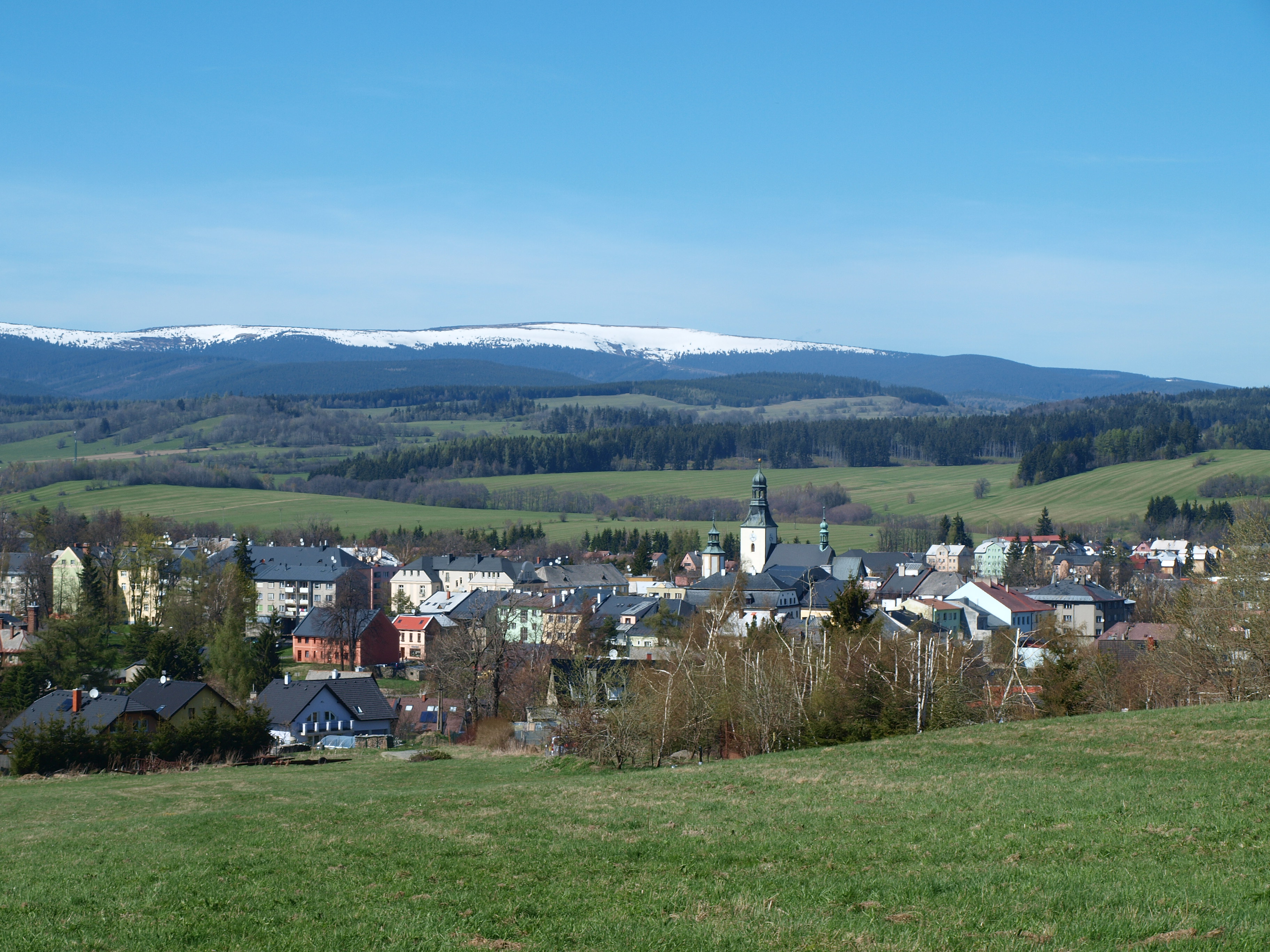
- View from the south

- Flag Coat of arms

- Location in the Czech Republic
- Coordinates: 49°55′55″N 17°16′19″E
- Country: Czech Republic
- Region: Moravian-Silesian
- District: Bruntál
- First mentioned: 1351

Government
  - Mayor: Luděk Šimko

Area
  - Total: 60.73 km^{2} (23.45 sq mi)
- Elevation: 555 m (1,821 ft)

Population (2026-01-01)
  - Total: 7,670
  - Density: 126/km^{2} (327/sq mi)
- Time zone: UTC+1 (CET)
  - Summer (DST): UTC+2 (CEST)
- Postal codes: 793 42, 793 51, 795 01
- Website: www.rymarov.cz

Rýmařov (Czech pronunciation: [ˈriːmar̝of]; German: Römerstadt) is a town in Bruntál District in the Moravian-Silesian Region of the Czech Republic. It has about 7,700 inhabitants. The town is located on the stream Podolský potok in the Nízký Jeseník range.

Rýmařov became a town in 1406. The historic town centre is well preserved and is protected as an urban monument zone. The main landmark of Rýmařov is the town hall.

== Administrative division ==
Rýmařov consists of seven municipal parts (in brackets population according to the 2021 census):

- Rýmařov (6,174)
- Edrovice (340)
- Harrachov (36)
- Jamartice (179)
- Janovice (640)
- Ondřejov (142)
- Stránské (60)

== Geography ==
Rýmařov is located about 15 kilometres (9 mi) southwest of Bruntál and 37 km (23 mi) north of Olomouc. It lies in the Nízký Jeseník range. The highest point is at 829 m (2,720 ft) above sea level. The town is situated at the confluence of the stream Podolský potok with several other small streams. The Podolský potok is a right tributary of the Moravice River, which forms the eastern municipal border.

== History ==
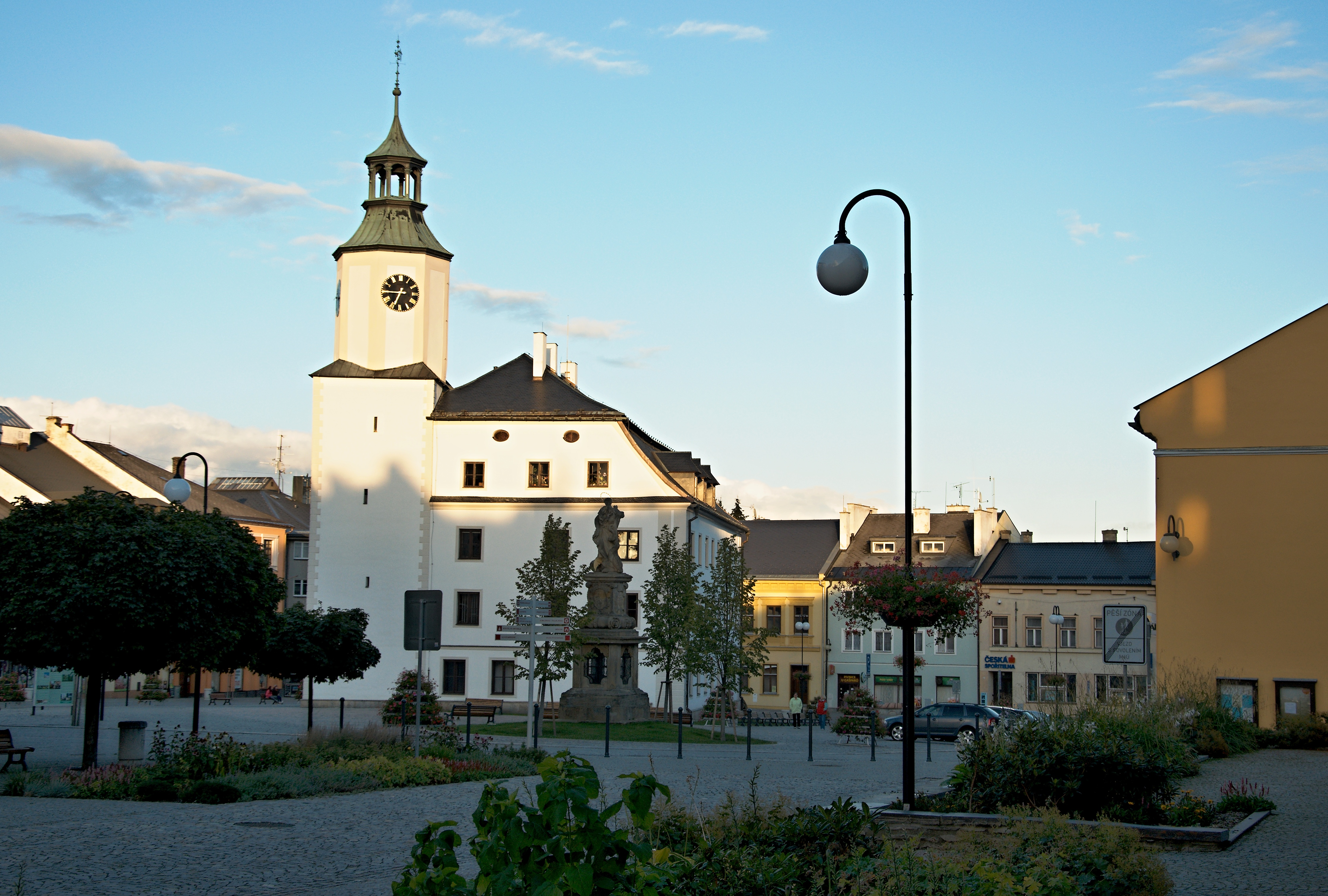
Náměstí Míru with the town hall

The first settlement was established in the site of Rýmařov in the early 13th century by Czech colonists, but around 1250 it was destroyed. It was renewed by German colonists in the second half of the 13th century. The first written mention of Rýmařov is from 1351. After 1350, a wooden fortress was built. In 1406, the village was promoted to a town.

The great development of Rýmařov and the whole region occurred with the mining of iron ore. Gold, silver with lead, copper and later zinc were also mined here. In 1474, the town was looted by Hungarian army. In the 16th century, Rýmařov prospered and developed, the hammer mills brought wealth to the town. Lutheranism began to prevail among the inhabitants. In 1583 the estate was bought by the Tyrolean aristocratic Hoffmann of Grünbüchl family, who took care of the town and developed education and forestry.

Prosperity ended with the Thirty Years' War. The town was occupied by the army under Lennart Torstensson in 1643–1650 and remained depopulated and poor after the army left. Re-Catholicisation took place after the war. In the second half of the 17th century, the town was threatened by the Northern Moravia witch trials, but in the end they did not bring any loss of life.

In 1721 the estate was bought from the Teutonic Order by the Harrach family, which became a new impetus for development. The Harrachs restored forestry, mines and smelters. In the first half of the 19th century, modern flax and cotton processing factories were established in and around the town. In 1878, the railway was opened.

Until 1918, the town was part of Austria-Hungary. After the World War I, the Czechoslovak government suppressed efforts to annex the area to Germany, and Czech workers began to come to the town where the German population dominated. In 1930, Germans made up 96% of the population.

In 1938, it was annexed by Nazi Germany and administered as part of Reichsgau Sudetenland. The Czech minority left inland and the Jewish minority was liquidated during World War II. After the war, in execution of the Beneš decrees, the almost entire German population was expelled and Rýmařov was repopulated by Czech settlers.

Between 1955 and 1974, there was the greatest disruption to the historic character of the town, when most of the original buildings on the west side of the square and adjacent streets were demolished and replaced by new buildings.

== Demographics ==
Historical population

Year	Pop.	±%
1869	9,864	—
1880	9,624	−2.4%
1890	9,101	−5.4%
1900	8,978	−1.4%
1910	9,062	+0.9%

Year	Pop.	±%
1921	8,339	−8.0%
1930	9,886	+18.6%
1950	6,697	−32.3%
1961	6,992	+4.4%
1970	7,586	+8.5%

Year	Pop.	±%
1980	9,174	+20.9%
1991	9,405	+2.5%
2001	9,167	−2.5%
2011	8,195	−10.6%
2021	7,571	−7.6%

Source: Censuses

== Transport ==
The I/11 road (the section from Šumperk to Bruntál, further continuing to Opava and Ostrava) passes through the town.

Rýmařov is the terminus and start of the railway line from/to Opava.

== Sights ==
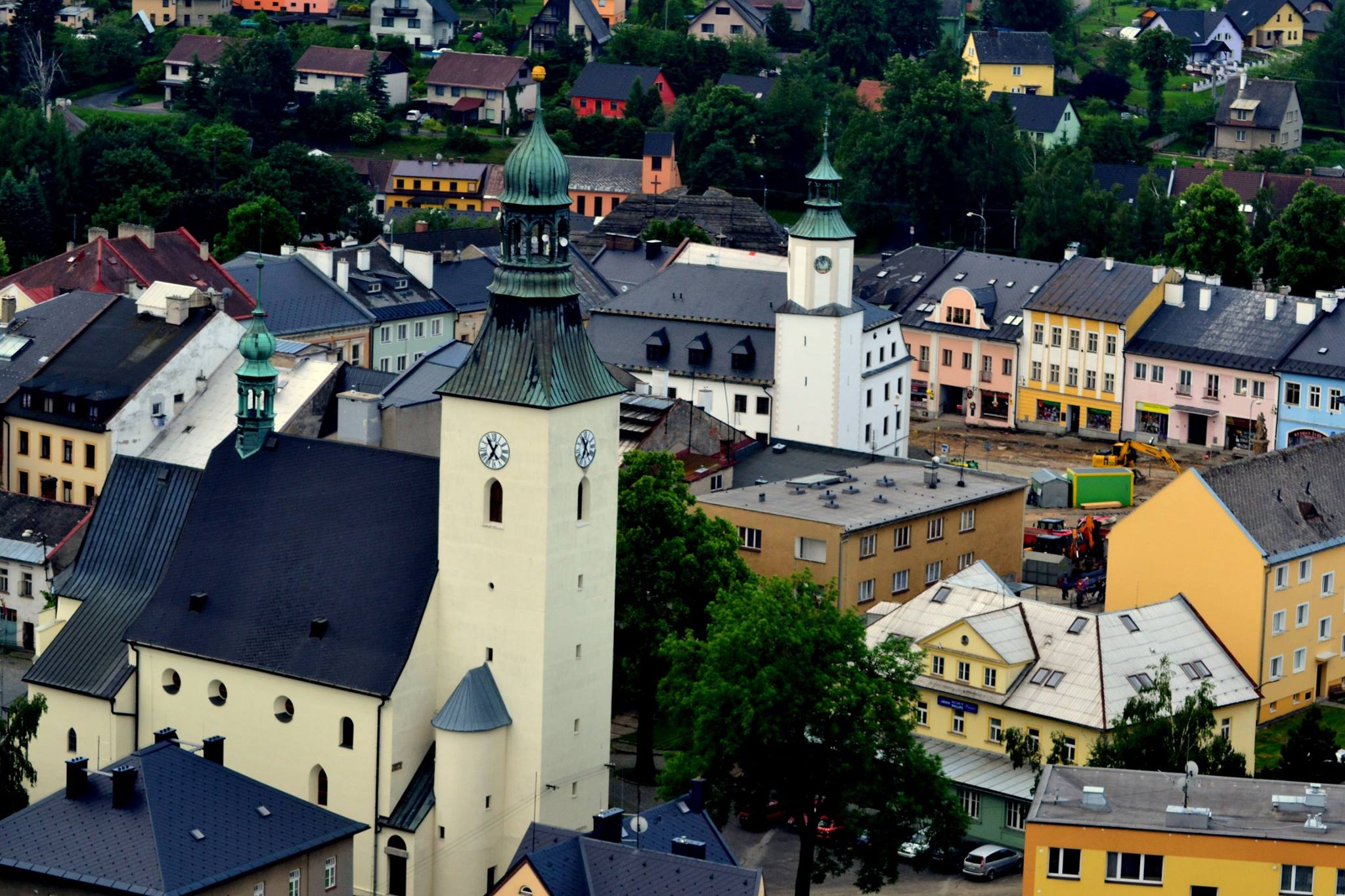
Centre of Rýmařov with the Church of Saint Michael the Archangel

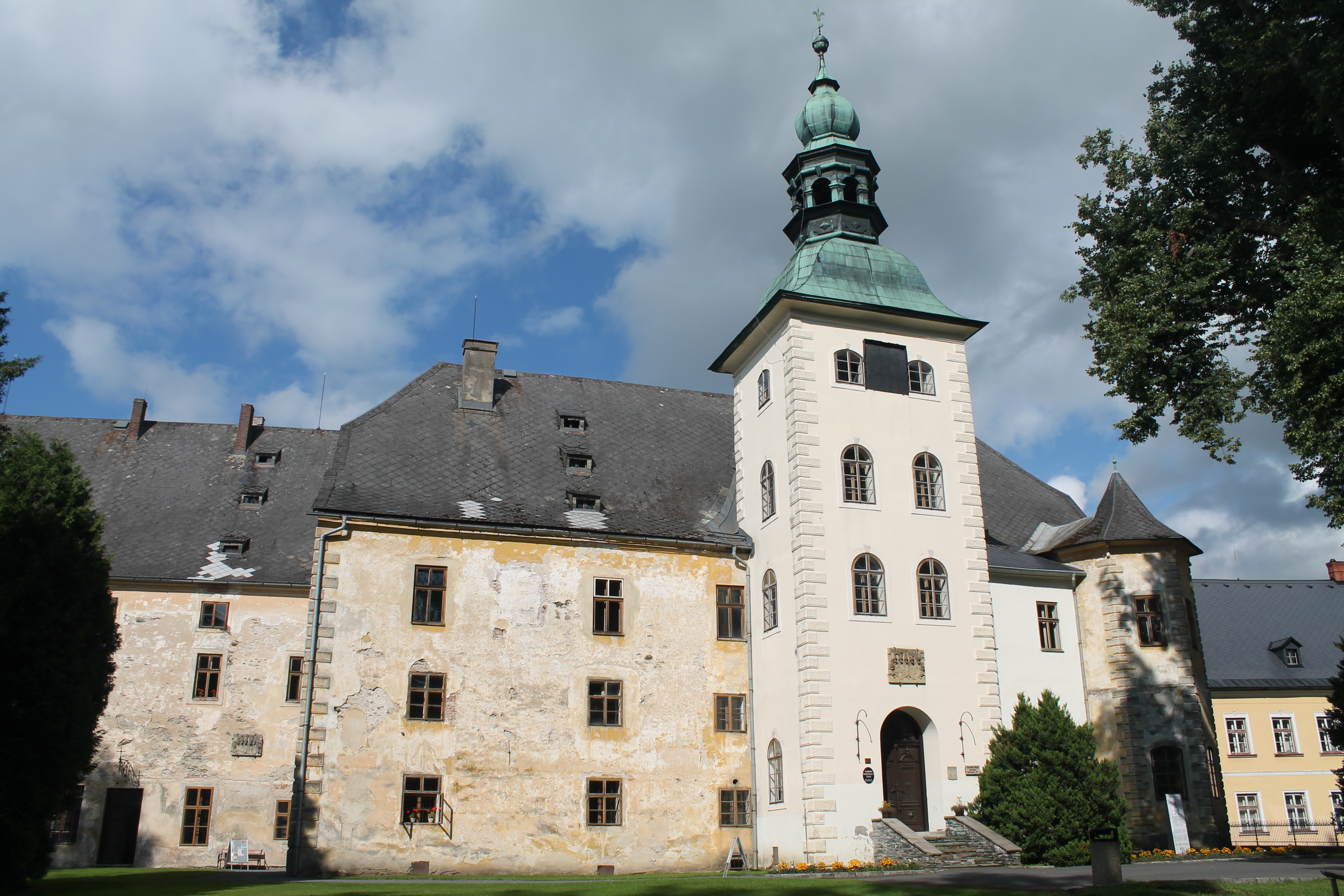
Janovice Castle

Houses with black roofs, both from the original slate or with newer roofing, are typical for Rýmařov and forms its characteristic panorama.

The town hall is the main landmark of the town square and the whole town. It is a large building with elements of Gothic, Renaissance, Baroque and Neoclassical styles. It was first documented in 1560 and probably dates from the early 15th century. It was damaged several times by fire and subsequently rebuilt. The last major reconstruction was in 1790–1808, when it acquired its present-day Neoclassical and Empire appearance.

On the western part of the square Náměstí Míru there is the Marian column from 1683. It was erected at the expense of Maria Elisabeth Richtenstein in memory of the plague epidemic that struck Rýmařov in 1680.

Janovice Castle was originally a late Gothic fortress, built in 1520–1530. It served as the seat of the owner of the estate. It was rebuilt into a Renaissance residence in 1586 and early Baroque alterations were made in 1663. In the 1840s, the castle was completely rebuilt in the late Baroque style. Today, the castle is partly used for cultural and social purposes. The rest of the castle is empty and unused. In 2018, it was purchased by the National Heritage Institute, which is planning its reconstruction.

The Chapel of the Visitation of the Virgin Mary is an important Baroque building from 1711–1715. It contains frescoes by Ferdinand Naboth and Johann Christoph Handke. In the foreground of the chapel is the statue of Our Lady of Victory from 1774 and a folk sculpture of the crucifixion from 1812.

The Church of Saint Michael is originally a Gothic building. Its existence is proven already in the first half of the 14th century. After the fire in 1609 it was reconstructed in the Renaissance style. The original gothic tower was equipped with a wooden porch and a helmet with four turrets in the corners, the slender gothic windows were partly walled up. After the fire in 1790, a reconstruction took place during which Neoclassical and Neorenaissance elements were added. The alterations were not completed until 1818 by restoring the church tower to its present appearance. The interior of the church is decorated with paintings of Johann Christoph Handke.

The rectory is a valuable Renaissance building from the 16th century. It originally served as a mining office.

=== Museums ===
The Town Museum is an institution with collections tracing the history of the region from the earliest prehistoric settlements to the first half of the 20th century. It was founded in 1901 by a local businessman and then mayor of the town, Wilhelm Ludwig. The place offers exhibitions on the development of mining, textile industry, and regional geology.

There is an outdoor exposition of the Town Museum in the place of the protected archaeological locality Hrádek, where a fortress was located in the 14th century.

The Museum of Tourist Stamps is a freely accessible exposition of the stamps.

== Notable people ==
- Johann Christoph Handke (1694–1774), Baroque painter
- Eugen Jettel (1845–1901), Austrian painter
- Otto Marburg (1874–1948), Austrian neurologist
- Hana Marvanová (born 1962), lawyer and politician
- Tomáš Ujfaluši (born 1978), footballer
- Ivana Uhlířová (born 1980), actress

== Twin towns – sister cities ==
Rýmařov is twinned with:

- Arco, Italy
- Belœil, Belgium
- Crosne, France
- Krompachy, Slovakia
- Ozimek, Poland
- Rajec, Slovakia
- Schotten, Germany
- Zeil am Main, Germany
