= Faculty of Social Sciences, Charles University =

University faculty in Prague, Czechia

- Fakulta sociálních věd Univerzity Karlovy
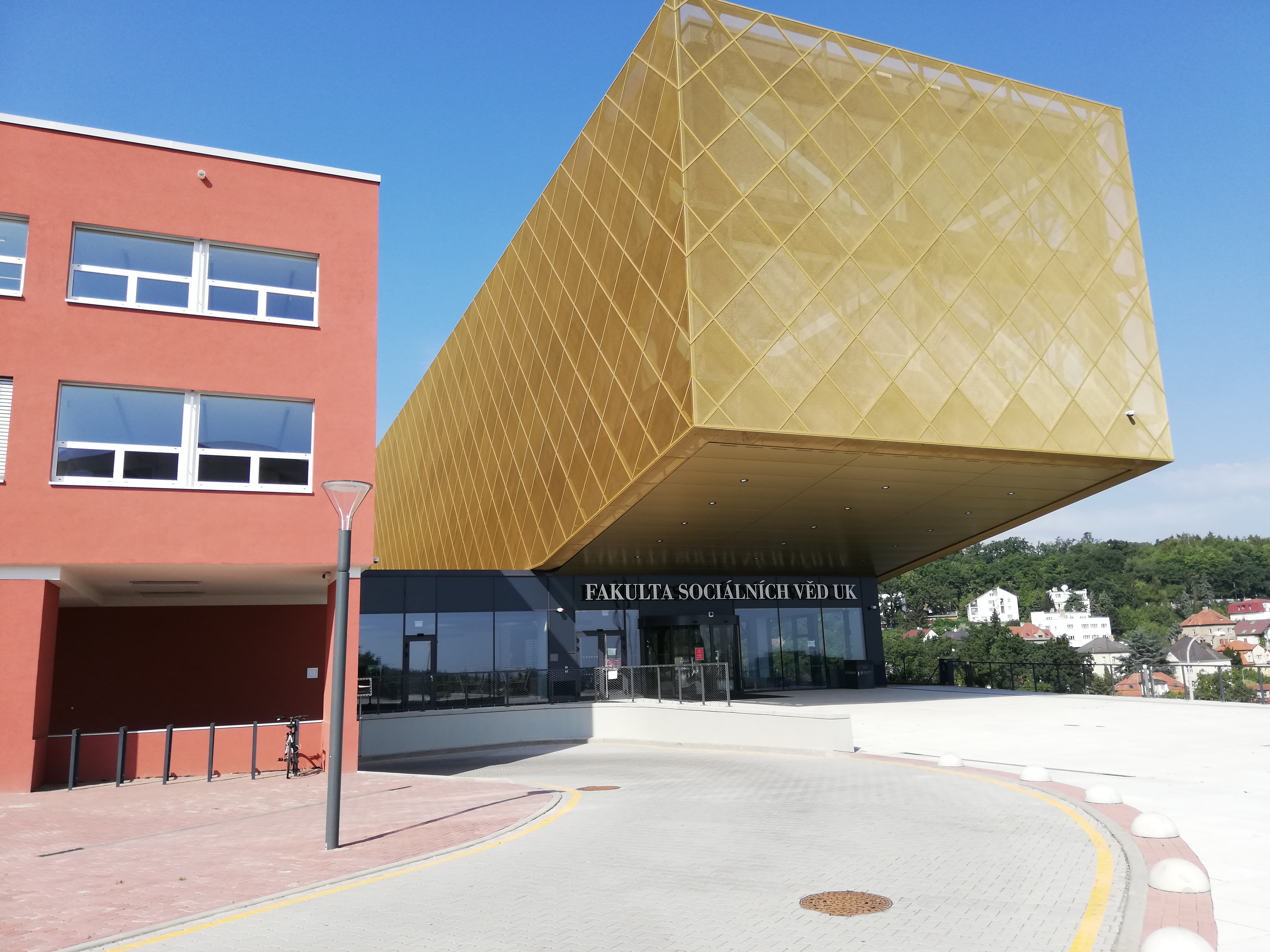
- Type: Public
- Established: 1990
- Dean: PhDr. JUDr. Tomáš Karásek, Ph.D.
- Students: ~5,000
- Location: Prague, Czech Republic
- Website: www.fsv.cuni.cz

The Faculty of Social Sciences (Czech: Fakulta sociálních věd Univerzity Karlovy) is one of the newest faculties of Charles University. The Faculty was founded in 1990, shortly after the Velvet Revolution. It soon became a regional centre of teaching and research in area studies, economics, international relations, journalism, media studies, sociology and political science. The Faculty offers bachelor's, master's, and doctoral degree programs in social sciences. While the languages of instruction are Czech and English, students can choose from classes in a wide range of other languages, including French, German, Russian and Spanish.

The Faculty enrolls around 5,000 full-time students, including 1,000 international students.

== Former names ==
- 1956–1960: Department of Journalism within the Faculty of Arts of Charles University
- 1960–1965: Institute of Education and Journalism (Institut osvěty a novinářství, ION)
- 1965–1968: Faculty of Education and Journalism (Fakulta osvěty a novinářství, FON)
- 1968–1972: Faculty of Social Sciences and Journalism (Fakulta sociálních věd a publicistiky, FSVP)
- 1972–1990: Faculty of Journalism (Fakulta žurnalistiky, FŽ)
- 1990–: Faculty of Social Sciences (Fakulta sociálních věd, FSV)

== History ==
Photocopy of Elena Lacková's university diploma from the faculty

The Faculty of Social Sciences was established on 1 June 1990. In the first phase of its existence, it tried to continue the tradition of the former Faculty of Social Sciences and Journalism (FSVP), which replaced the Faculty of Education and Journalism of Charles University (FON) in 1968. As early as 1956, the Department of Journalism was established within the Faculty of Arts of Charles University. Since 1960, the Department of Journalism has been part of the Institute of Education and Journalism as an independent faculty within Charles University, and since 1965 it has existed independently under the name Faculty of Education and Journalism of Charles University. The first dean of this new faculty was the writer Jiří Marek. After 1963, the aforementioned institute found its headquarters in the historic Buquoy House on the Karolina campus with an entrance from Celetná Street.

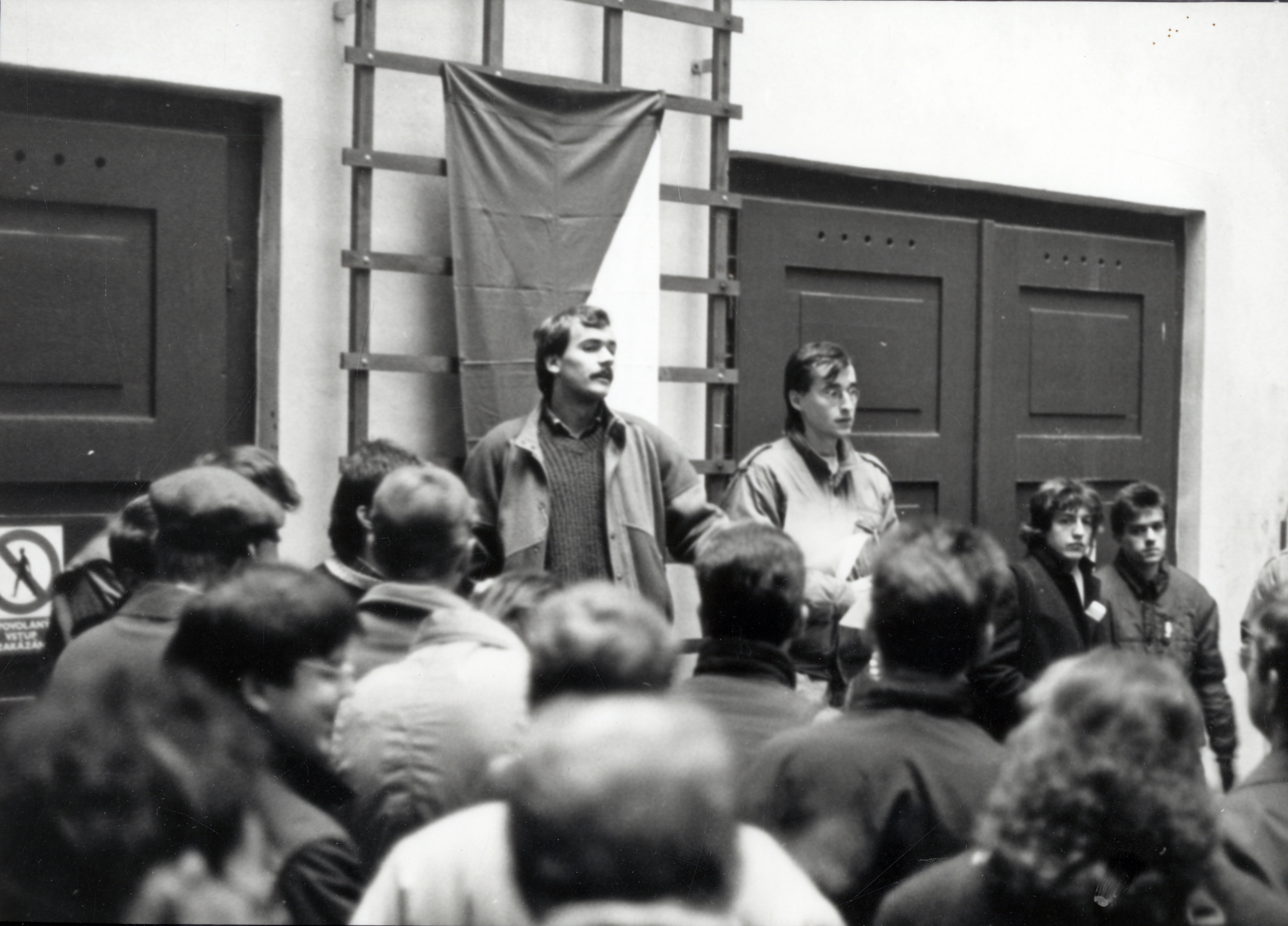
Pavel Žáček declared a strike at the Faculty of Journalism, Charles University, on November 20, 1989.

In 1972, the Faculty of Social Sciences and Journalism at Charles University was renamed the Faculty of Journalism at Charles University, and its content was transformed in the spirit of ongoing normalization. These changes included readings among teachers and checks on the political views of journalism students.

In 1993, the faculty was organizationally divided into institutes, which led to the abolition of existing scientific departments and at the same time emphasized the pedagogical character of the faculty. The following were established at the FSV: Institute of Communication Studies and Journalism, Institute of Economic Studies, Institute of Sociological Studies and Institute of Political Studies. In 1994, the faculty structure was completed with the last institute: the Institute of International Studies.

== Organisation ==
=== Institutes ===
- Institute of Economic Studies (IES): economics and finance
- Institute of Communication Studies and Journalism (ICSJ): media studies, journalism, marketing communication and public relations
- Institute of International Studies (IIS): area studies of North America, Europe and Eurasia
- Institute of Political Studies (IPS): political science, international relations and security studies
- Institute of Sociological Studies (ISS): sociology, social and public policy and social anthropology

=== Other units ===
- Centre for Media Studies (CEMES)
- Centre for Social and Economic Strategies (CESES)
- Department of Foreign Languages
- Scientific Information Centre
- Centre for Information Technology

== Study ==
Studies at the Faculty of Social Sciences are intended to prepare students for a professional career in the private sector, public administration, national governments, European institutions, academic research or the media. They are divided into three individual cycles: Bachelor's degree cycle (3 years; Bc., equivalent to a BA), Master's degree cycle (2 years; Mgr., equivalent to an MA), and Doctoral studies (4 years; Ph.D.).

=== Degree programs ===
The Faculty offers degree programs at all levels in its subject specializations in both Czech and English. The English language degree programs offer one fully accredited English language bachelor´s degree program, ten fully accredited English language master's degree programs, and two double-degree programs in partnership with universities in London and Strasbourg.

- Bachelor in Economics and Finance (BEF) offers training in mathematics, statistics and econometrics. It covers key fields of economics and finance, mostly through courses surveying recent theory and empirics.
- Balkan, Eurasian and Central European Studies (BECES) offers versatile exploration of “the East”, understood as a territory composed of Central Europe, the Balkan Peninsula and Post- Soviet areas.
- Central European Comparative Studies (CECS) focuses on Germany, Austria and the Visegrád Countries (the Czech Republic, Slovakia, Poland and Hungary) with an overlap onto neighboring regions.
- Corporate Finance and Strategy (CFS) is a two-year English-language Master's double-degree program with the University of Strasbourg aiming at providing students with a broad knowledge and understanding of economic theory with a focus on financial and international economics.
- European Studies (ES) focuses on the study of Europe and on the European integration process in all its complexity and variety.
- Geopolitical Studies (GPS) seeks to explore the dynamic relationship between international politics and human geography, focusing on essential theories, thinkers and regions.
- International Economic and Political Studies (IEPS) offers a multidisciplinary investigation of contemporary political, economic and social issues.
- International Masters in Economy, State and Society (IMESS) in partnership with UCL School of Slavonic and East European Studies. The program offers three distinct study tracks, reflecting the unique multidisciplinary expertise of the consortium institutions.
- Master in International Security Studies (MISS) offers students a tour through security, conflict and strategic studies in the context of international relations.
- Master in Economics and Finance (MEF) gives the student a thorough grounding in both theoretical and applied economics.
- Public and Social Policy (PSP) provides students with relevant knowledge of policy-making process and cultivate their analytical skills. The program offers deeper knowledge in concrete policy domains such as social policy, health policy, educational policy, employment policy or others.
- Sociology in European Context (SEC) is a program designed for international students interested in gaining in-depth knowledge of the state of the present-day field including its theory and research methods.
- Transatlantic Studies (TS) aims to provide English speaking students with deep, interdisciplinary knowledge of transatlantic relations since 1945. The program gives a Central European perspective on transatlantic relations.

=== Other programs ===
The Faculty offers summer school programs to its students, visiting students and the general public. For international students, the Faculty organizes Spring University Prague and Summer University Prague each April and September. This program is intended for students who are enrolled in a college or university or have recently graduated. It is open to approximately 30 students from across the world.

== Scholarships and funding ==
- Scholarships for Students from Developing and Transition Countries administered directly by the Faculty of Social Sciences
- Merit Scholarship awarded by the faculty in the amount of CZK 15 000
- Czech Government Scholarships for Developing Countries
- International Visegrad Fund Scholarships
- Erasmus Mundus External Cooperation Window Lot 3 Scholarships for Students from Israel and Palestine

== International mobility ==
The Faculty has one of the highest international mobility participation rates of all the faculties of Charles University. Each year it welcomes around 500 exchange students.

International mobility at the Faculty is mainly based on the European Higher Education Area which is coordinated by the Bologna Process. Its most visible demonstration is the ERASMUS Programme. In addition to the Erasmus Programme, the Faculty participates in other smaller student exchange programs, such as Erasmus Mundus, CEEPUS or AKTION. The Faculty is also intensively developing international cooperation beyond the framework of the European programs. This includes the maintenance of or entering into new cooperation with partner universities in North America, Asia and the Middle East.

== Notable people ==
=== Academics ===
- Václav Moravec (Institute of Communication Studies and Journalism) – one of the most popular and influential Czech journalists; his Sunday political talk show, Otázky Václava Moravce, draws nearly 750,000 viewers each week
- Miroslav Novák (Institute of Political Studies) – one of the founders of political science in the Czech Republic and a key figure in the field
- Miloslav Petrusek (Institute of Sociological Studies) – former Dean of the Faculty; a doyen of Czech sociology
- Lenka Rovná (Institute of International Studies) – a recipient of the title Jean Monnet Chair Ad Personam, established by the European Commission to award top professors in European Studies
- Zdeněk Tůma (Institute of Economic Studies) – former Governor of the Czech National Bank

=== Alumni ===
- Petr Just – political scientist
- Barbora Kroužková – moderator
- Tomáš Pojar – diplomat, former deputy minister of foreign affairs of the Czech Republic, Czech ambassador in Israel (since 2010)
- Tomáš Sedláček – economist, Chief Macroeconomic Strategist at ČSOB, the largest Czech bank
- Pavel Žáček – former director of the Institute for the Study of Totalitarian Regimes
- Robert Záruba – commentator at Czech Television and lecturer at the Faculty of Social Sciences, Charles University in Prague, in journalism
