= Joseph Ignatz Sadler =

Czech painter (1725–1767)

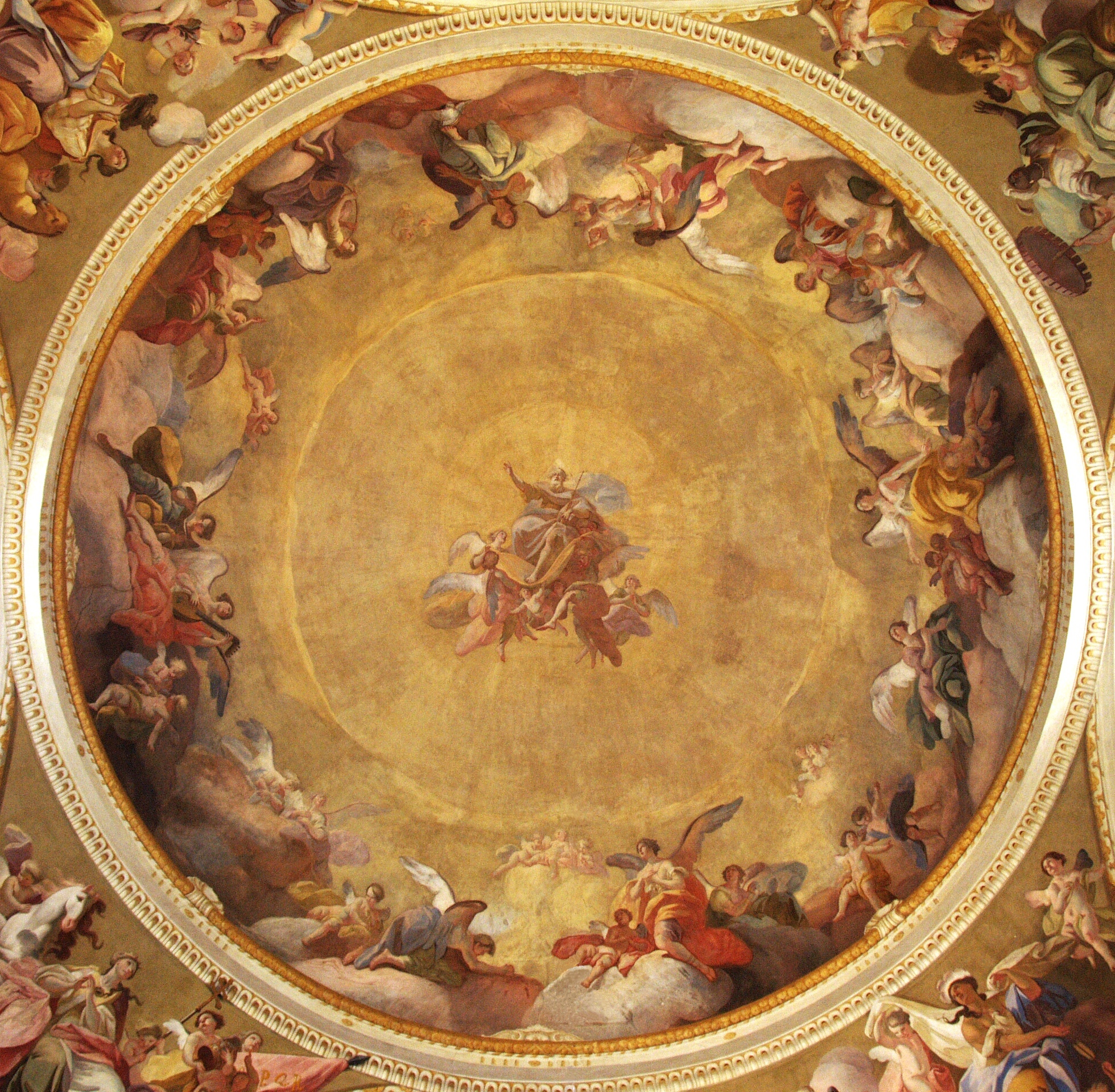
The Adoration of God the Father fresco by in the Church of the Holy Trinity in Fulnek

Joseph Ignatz Sadler (17 February 1725 – 9 January 1767) was a Czech painter.

== Life ==
Sadler was born in Olomouc, and primarily painted religious-themed frescoes. acting especially in Moravia, for example the frescoes on the ceiling of the Church of the Holy Trinity, Fulnek. He was the brother-in-law of the painter Johann Christoph Handke. He was of German minority ethnics in Moravia.
