= Felix Ivo Leicher =

Czech-Austrian painter (1727–1812)

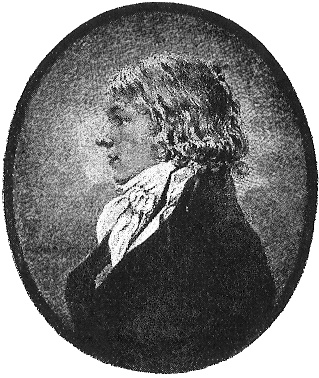
Portrait of Felix Ivo Leicher, taken from Das Kuhländchen. 7. Band. Neu-Titſchein: L. V. Enders’ſch, 1926. Pg. 17

Felix Ivo Leicher (18 or 19 May 1727 – 20 February 1812) was a Czech-Austrian painter of altarpieces and secular works, which was spread to a wide area throughout the Habsburg Empire and beyond.

== Early life ==
He was born in the Silesian town Bílovec, today on the wall to the right of the main entrance of the parish church is a plaque that hangs in his memory. He was apprenticed to a weaver, and later studied cutlery at school. But his break came in a local painter shop with Francis Andrew Schaffer, where he learned the basics of painting. Painting excited him and it became his entire life. From 1751 he studied at the Academy of Fine Arts Vienna, and in 1754 in a competition he received the second prize for painting Anointing Saul the King (today, this image is a preparatory sketch in the German National Museum in Nuremberg), which had secured the support of the future of this school.

== Career ==
His teacher there was, Franz Anton Maulbertsch, with whom he worked throughout his life kept friendly relations, working together as the frescoes and paintings for a church in Mikulov. In many places, Leicher painted altarpieces in churches with frescoes. A typical example of that is the altarpiece of the Church of the Holy Trinity in Fulnek, that he painted around 1760. The influence of his teachers could be seen in his work, as is evident in the rich coloristic main altar painting in Bílovec. In several cases, the works were long attributed to just Maulbertsch and only recently found their true authorship as Leicher's.

There is now no doubt that many of his works are still hidden in anonymity in various churches and collections, sometimes surprisingly authorship is revealed even smaller genre paintings and numerous sketches and drawings bear the marks of his hands. In the latter part of the 18th century he devoted himself also to creating smaller cabinet paintings with secular themes.

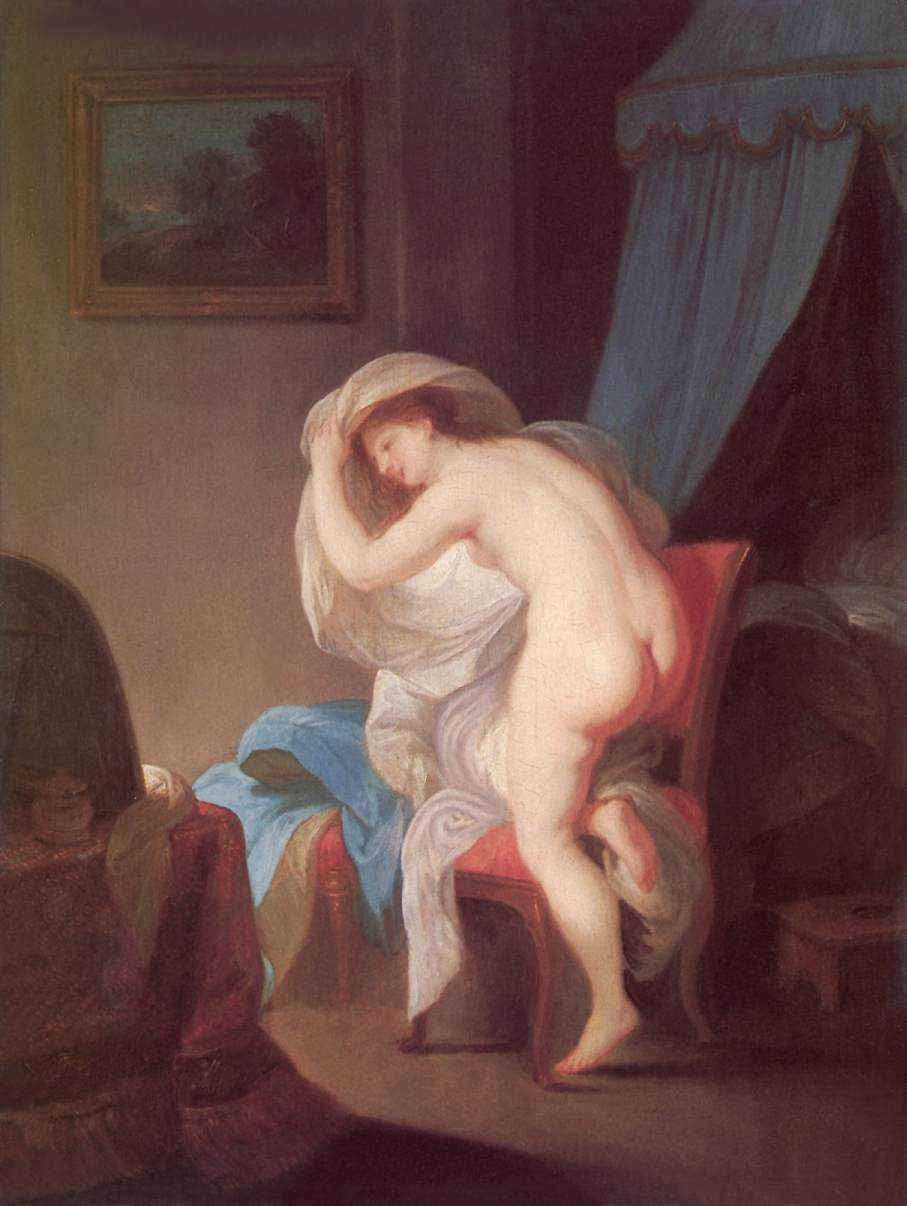
The Evening by Felix Ivo Leicher, Museum of Fine Arts (Budapest), 1780s

== Style ==
His composition, the concept of shapes, light handling and other features paintings show a significant effect of the work Maulbertsch, whose work he admired. His approach is quieter, the expression of the character rather lyrical, restrained, narrative tuned. Unlike Maulbertsch, Leicher was not affected by the expressive manifestation of Paul Troger. He was inspired apparently also by other Venetian painters of 18th century, particularly the compositions of Giambattista Pittoni, and also images of Peter Paul Rubens. It is most evident on two paintings for the church altar of John the Baptist in Kroměříž. Its development lacks obvious drama or a representative sample of altarpieces in Opava parish church of the Assumption, which are often seen as the most perfect, do not lose connection to the Rococo works of his early creative period.

Some critics, however, see more inspiration coming from the works of Michelangelo Unterberger, a professor at the Vienna Academy, whose work was a kind of moderate variant of the former academic uniform style, especially for it suggests a simple, clear compositional solutions and more lyrical, moderate tone of works by both artists.
