= Bílovec =

- Town
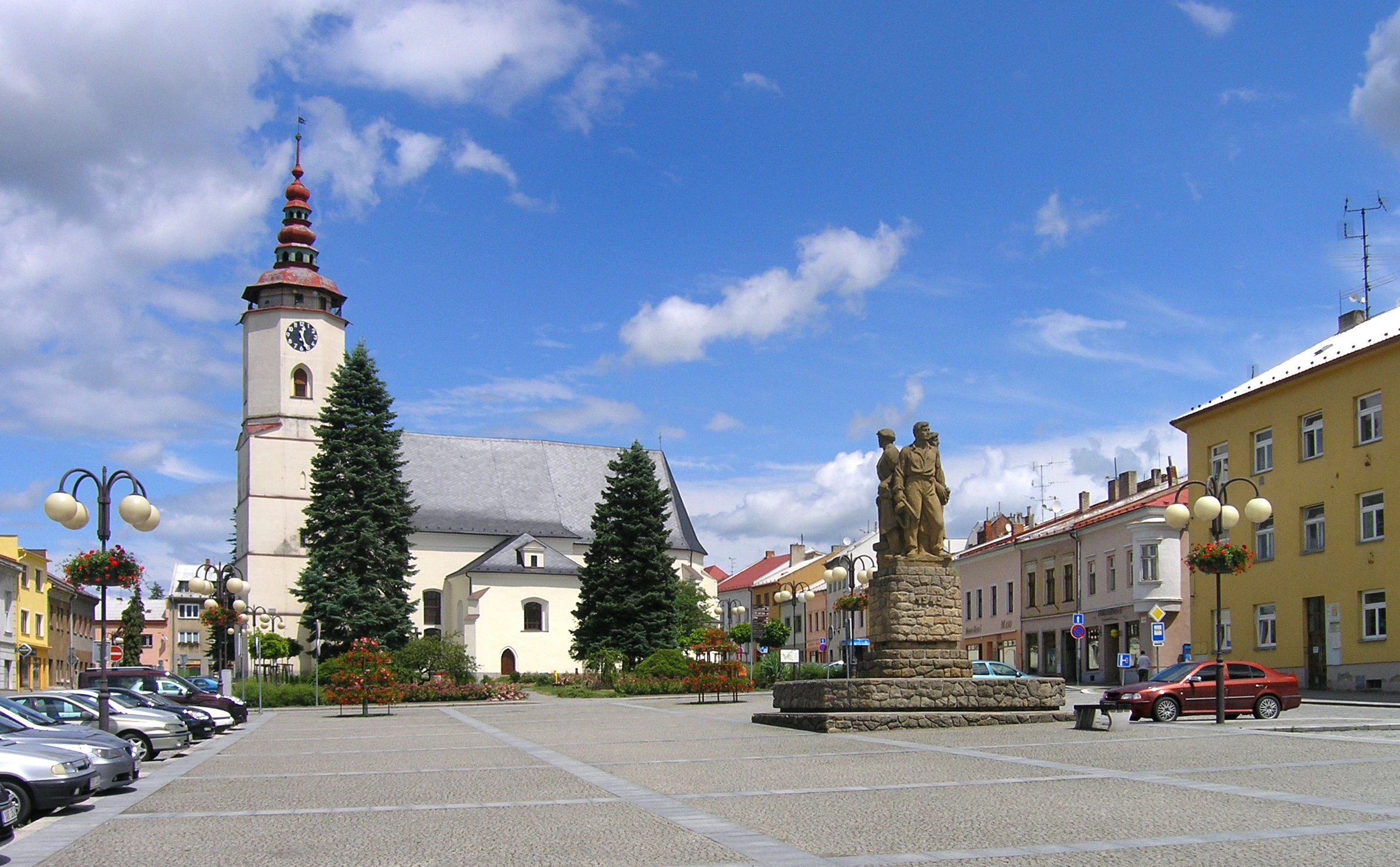
- Town square with the Church of Saint Nicholas

- Flag Coat of arms

- Location in the Czech Republic
- Coordinates: 49°45′23″N 18°0′57″E
- Country: Czech Republic
- Region: Moravian-Silesian
- District: Nový Jičín
- First mentioned: 1324

Government
  - Mayor: Martin Holub

Area
  - Total: 38.89 km^{2} (15.02 sq mi)
- Elevation: 243 m (797 ft)

Population (2026-01-01)
  - Total: 7,349
  - Density: 189.0/km^{2} (489.4/sq mi)
- Time zone: UTC+1 (CET)
  - Summer (DST): UTC+2 (CEST)
- Postal codes: 742 92, 743 01
- Website: www.bilovec.cz

Bílovec (Czech pronunciation: [ˈbiːlovɛts]; German: Wagstadt) is a town in Nový Jičín District in the Moravian-Silesian Region of the Czech Republic. It has about 7,300 inhabitants. The town proper is located on the Bílovka River in the Nízký Jeseník range. The historic town centre is well preserved and is protected as an urban monument zone.

== Administrative division ==
Bílovec consists of seven municipal parts (in brackets population according to the 2021 census):

- Bílovec (5,479)
- Bravinné (289)
- Lhotka (119)
- Lubojaty (388)
- Ohrada (64)
- Stará Ves (593)
- Výškovice (227)

Výškovice forms an exclave of the municipal territory.

== Geography ==
Bílovec is located about 16 kilometres (10 mi) west of Ostrava. It lies mostly in the Nízký Jeseník range, only a small part of the territory extends into the Moravian Gate lowland. The town is situated on both banks of the Bílovka River. Bílovec Reservoir is located on the outskirts of the town.

== History ==
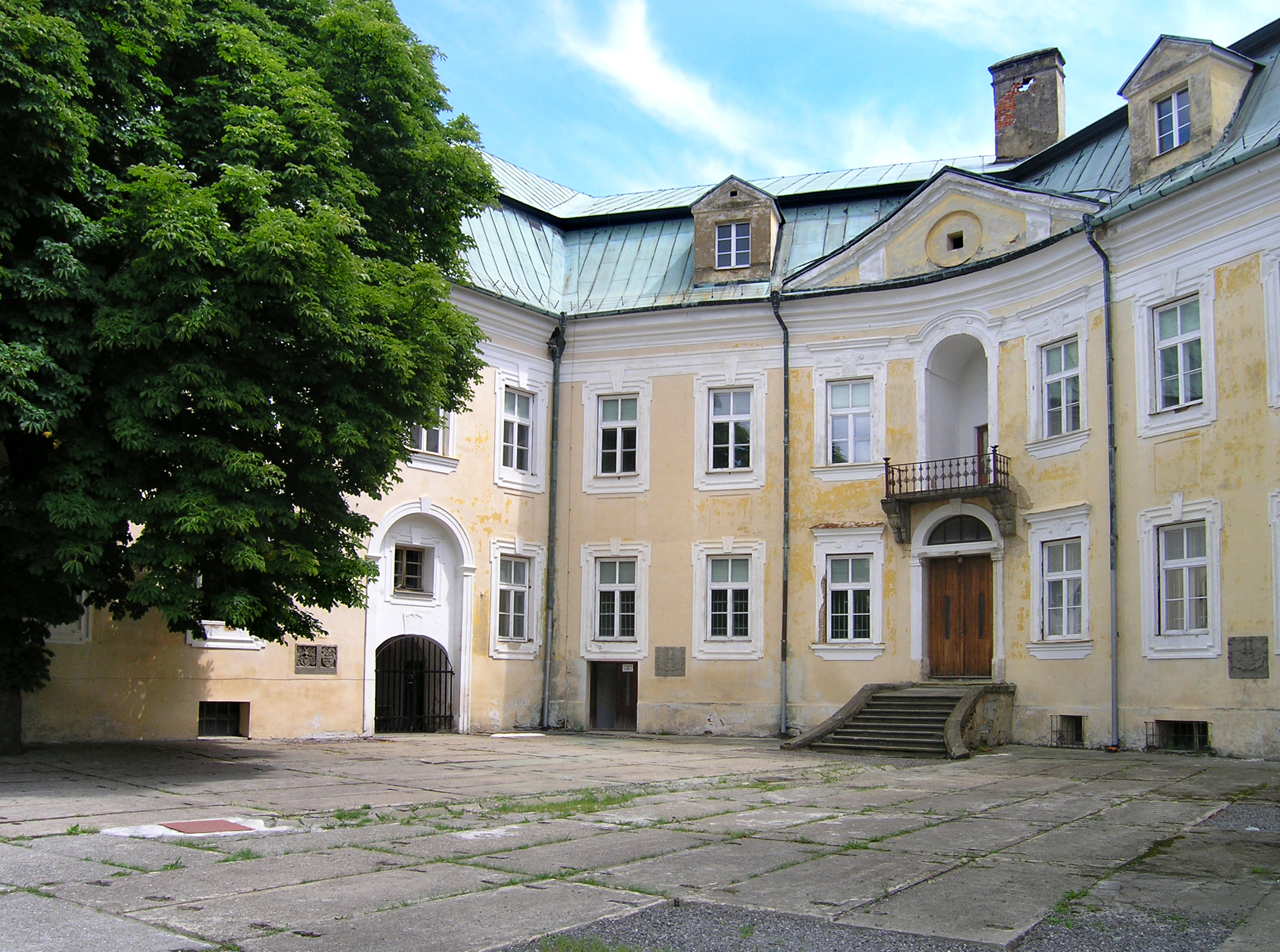
Bílovec Castle

The first written mention of Bílovec is from 1324. The town was probably founded by Vok V of Kravaře between 1293–1324. It was located on the crossroads of two trade routes and belonged to the Duchy of Troppau. Bílovec was heavily fortified with walls with two gates and a fortress.

In 1575–1576, the then-owner Bernard Pražma of Bílkov had rebuilt the fortress into a four-wing Renaissance castle. From 1652 until the 20th century, the estate was held by the Sedlnický of Choltice family. The town gained various privileges which allowed it to develop further. After a large fire in 1729, the castle was reconstructed in the Baroque style.

In the second half of the 19th century, Bílovec was industrialised. A cloth factory (later a hat factory and then an iron factory), a steam saw, a book printer and a liqueur factory were established. In 1890, the railway connection was opened.

Until 1918, Bílovec was part of Austria-Hungary. From 1938, it was annexed by Nazi Germany and administered as part of the Reichsgau Sudetenland, the portion of Czechoslovakia turned over to Germany in the wake of the Munich Agreement. After the conclusion of World War II, the German speaking population was expelled from the region in 1945 according to the Beneš decrees and replaced by Czech settlers.

After World War II, prefabricated houses were constructed, which disrupted the ancient character of the town.

== Demographics ==
Historical population

Year	Pop.	±%
1869	6,487	—
1880	6,934	+6.9%
1890	7,080	+2.1%
1900	7,467	+5.5%
1910	7,749	+3.8%

Year	Pop.	±%
1921	6,831	−11.8%
1930	7,422	+8.7%
1950	5,404	−27.2%
1961	6,380	+18.1%
1970	6,615	+3.7%

Year	Pop.	±%
1980	7,215	+9.1%
1991	7,552	+4.7%
2001	7,494	−0.8%
2011	7,387	−1.4%
2021	7,159	−3.1%

Source: Censuses

== Transport ==
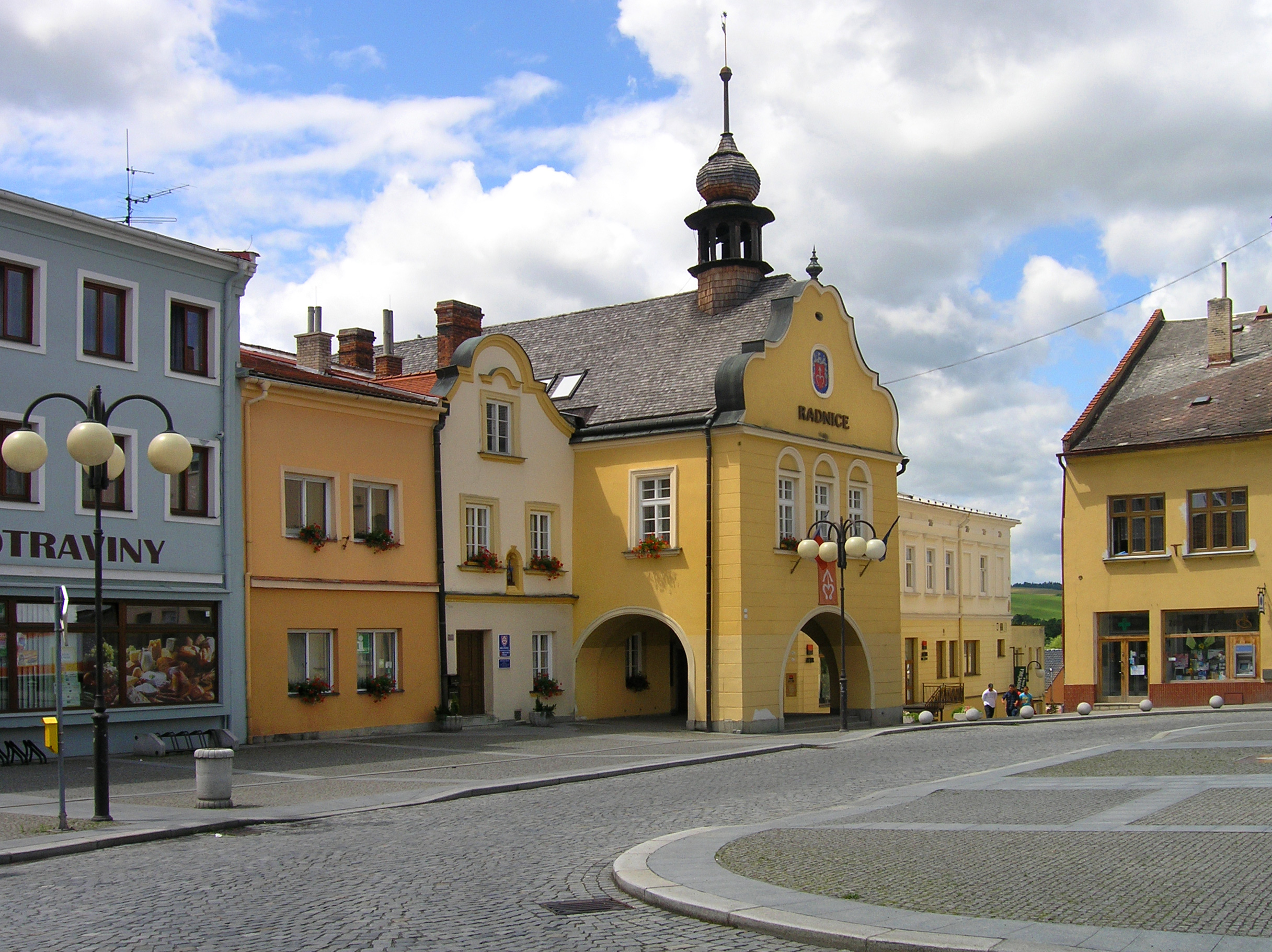
Town hall

The D1 motorway (the section from Brno to Ostrava) runs southeast of the town, outside the municipal territory.

Bílovec is the starting point and terminus of a short railway line from/to Studénka.

== Education ==
There is one secondary school in Bílovec, the Gymnasium of Mikuláš Koperník.

== Sights ==
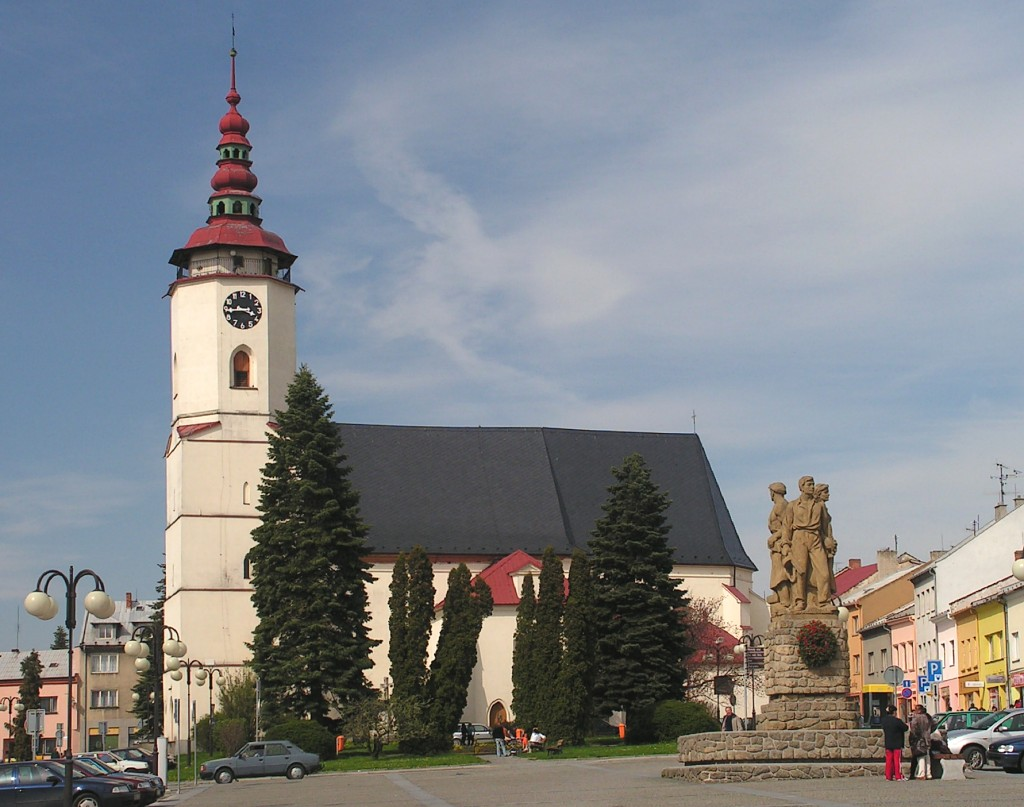
Church of Saint Nicholas

The town square is lined by preserved burgher houses. The main landmarks of the square are the town hall and the Church of Saint Nicholas. The Renaissance town hall with Gothic cellars dates from 1593. The town museum is located in a Baroque burgher house from the 18th century.

The originally Gothic church was built in the 14th century. In 1771, Baroque modifications of the church were made. The tower was built in 1614–1615. It is 50.67 metres (166.2 ft) high and open to the public.

In the middle of the square is a giant chessboard, with an area of 8 by 8 metres (26 by 26 ft) the largest one in the Czech Republic.

Bílovec Castle is open to the public. It contains several expositions and an art gallery.

== Notable people ==
- Johann Ignaz Cimbal (1722–1795), Austrian painter
- Felix Ivo Leicher (1727–1812), Czech-Austrian painter
- Miloš Holaň (born 1971), ice hockey player and coach
- Květa Peschke (born 1975), tennis player
- Jakub Seidler (born 1983), economist
- Rostislav Olesz (born 1985), ice hockey player
- Lukáš Hejda (born 1990), footballer
- Petra Kvitová (born 1990), tennis player
- Adam Pavlásek (born 1994), tennis player

== Twin towns – sister cities ==
Bílovec is twinned with:

- Bad Neustadt an der Saale, Germany
- Kietrz, Poland
- Lipany, Slovakia
