= Tibor Cimbal =

Serbian footballer

Personal information
- Full name: Tibor Cimbal
- Date of birth: 10 May 1962 (age 64)
- Place of birth: Novi Sad, FPR Yugoslavia
- Position: Midfielder

Senior career*
Years	Team	Apps	(Gls)
1984–1985	Vojvodina	25	(4)
1985–1986	Kikinda	28	(6)
1986–1987	Vojvodina	19	(2)
- * Club domestic league appearances and goals

Tibor Cimbal (Serbian Cyrillic: Тибор Цимбал; born 10 May 1962) is a former Serbian footballer.

== Career ==
Born in Novi Sad, FPR Yugoslavia, he played with FK Vojvodina and OFK Kikinda in Yugoslavia. Later he moved to France.
