= Institute of Economic Studies, Charles University =

Public research center in Prague, Czech Republic

Institute of Economic Studies
- Institut ekonomických studií
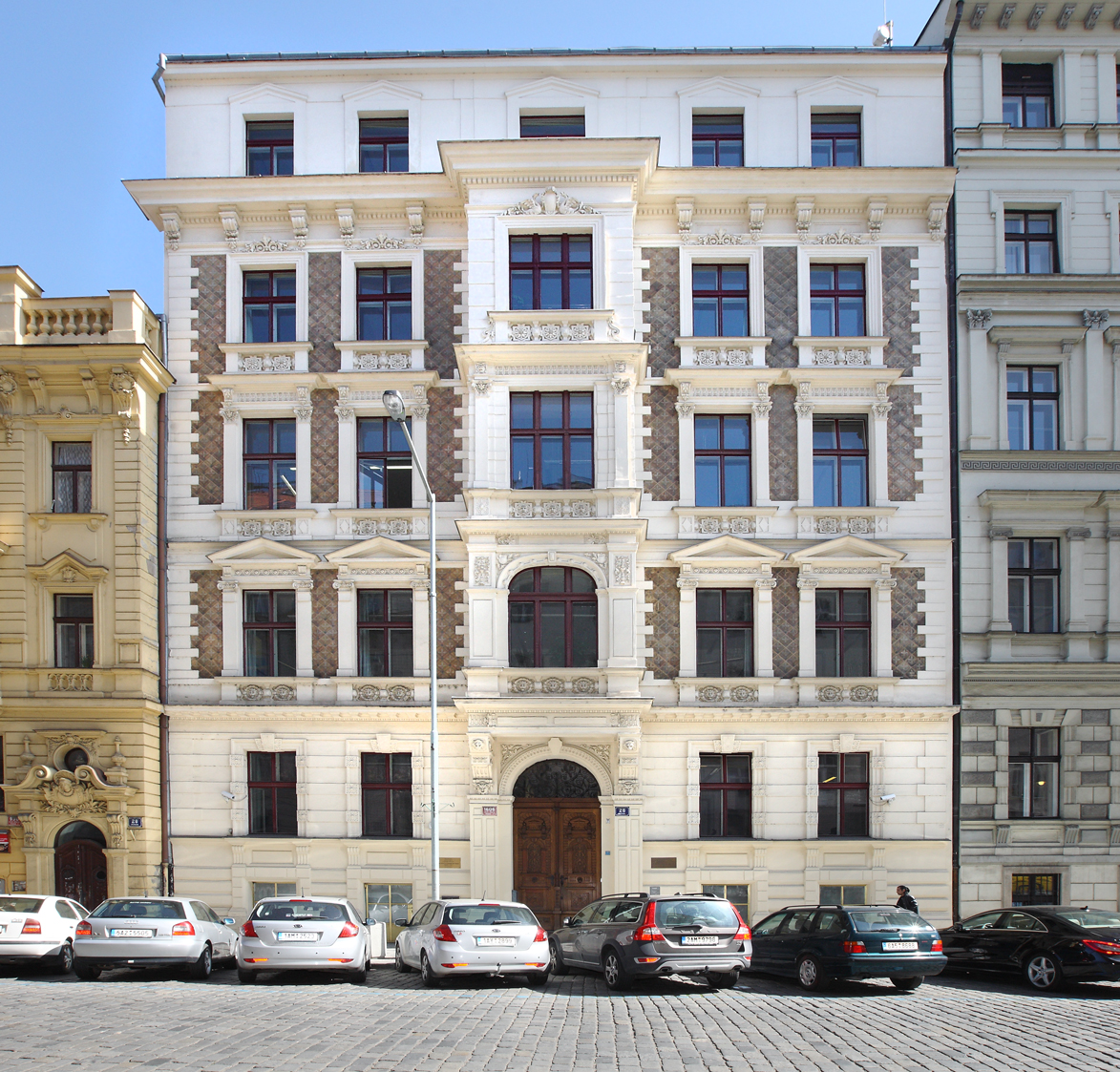
- Building of the Institute of Economic Studies
- Established: 1993
- Parent institution: Charles University
- Affiliations: Faculty of Social Sciences, Charles University
- Director: Adam Geršl
- Location: Prague, Czech Republic
- Website: ies.fsv.cuni.cz

The Institute of Economic Studies (IES) is a department of the Faculty of Social Sciences at Charles University in Prague, Czech Republic. It was established in May 1993 during the reorganization of the faculty, evolving from the former Department of Economics and Institute of Economic Sciences. The institute is housed in the main building of the faculty on Opletalova Street in central Prague.

== Rankings and reputation ==
The IES is widely regarded as one of the leading institutions for economics education and research in the Czech Republic. According to a 2016 ranking by the Czech newspaper Hospodářské noviny, IES was named the best economics school in the country. The institute is the top-rated Czech economic research institution according to RePEc (Research Papers in Economics).

Internationally, Charles University is ranked among the top 100 in economics and top 200 in finance according to the Shanghai Rankings. The U.S. News Best Global Universities ranked Charles University 111th globally in economics and business.

== Academic programs ==
The IES offers bachelor's, master's, and doctoral programs, with a strong focus on quantitative methods and theoretical foundations in economics and finance.

=== Undergraduate programs ===
- Economics and Finance - taught in Czech
- Bachelor in Economics and Finance (BEF) – tuition-based, taught in English

The undergraduate curriculum emphasizes mathematics, theoretical and applied economics, econometrics, and finance.

=== Graduate programs ===
- Economics and Finance - Taught in Czech
- Master in Economics and Finance (MEF) – in English
- Master in Finance and Data Analytics (MFDA) – in English
- Corporate Strategy and Finance (CSF) – in English, in cooperation with the University of Strasbourg

Graduate studies offer specialization in economic theory, modeling, finance, and financial markets. Approximately 70% of undergraduate and 88% of graduate courses are taught in English. About 91% of theses are written in English.

=== Doctoral programs ===
The institute also offers a PhD program in economics, focused on theoretical research and its applications in economic and financial analysis. Each year, the institute graduates approximately 90 bachelor's, 80 master's, and 5 doctoral students.

== Student recognition ==
Students of the IES have received awards and participated in international competitions such as:

- BCG Strategy Cup
- CFA Institute Research Challenge
- Global Management Challenge
- Rotman European Trading Competition

Students of the IES have also been awarded prestigious prizes, including:

- Olga Radzyner Award
- Young Economist Award
- Karel Engliš Prize
- Josef Hlávka Award
- Energy Economics Contest

== Notable people ==
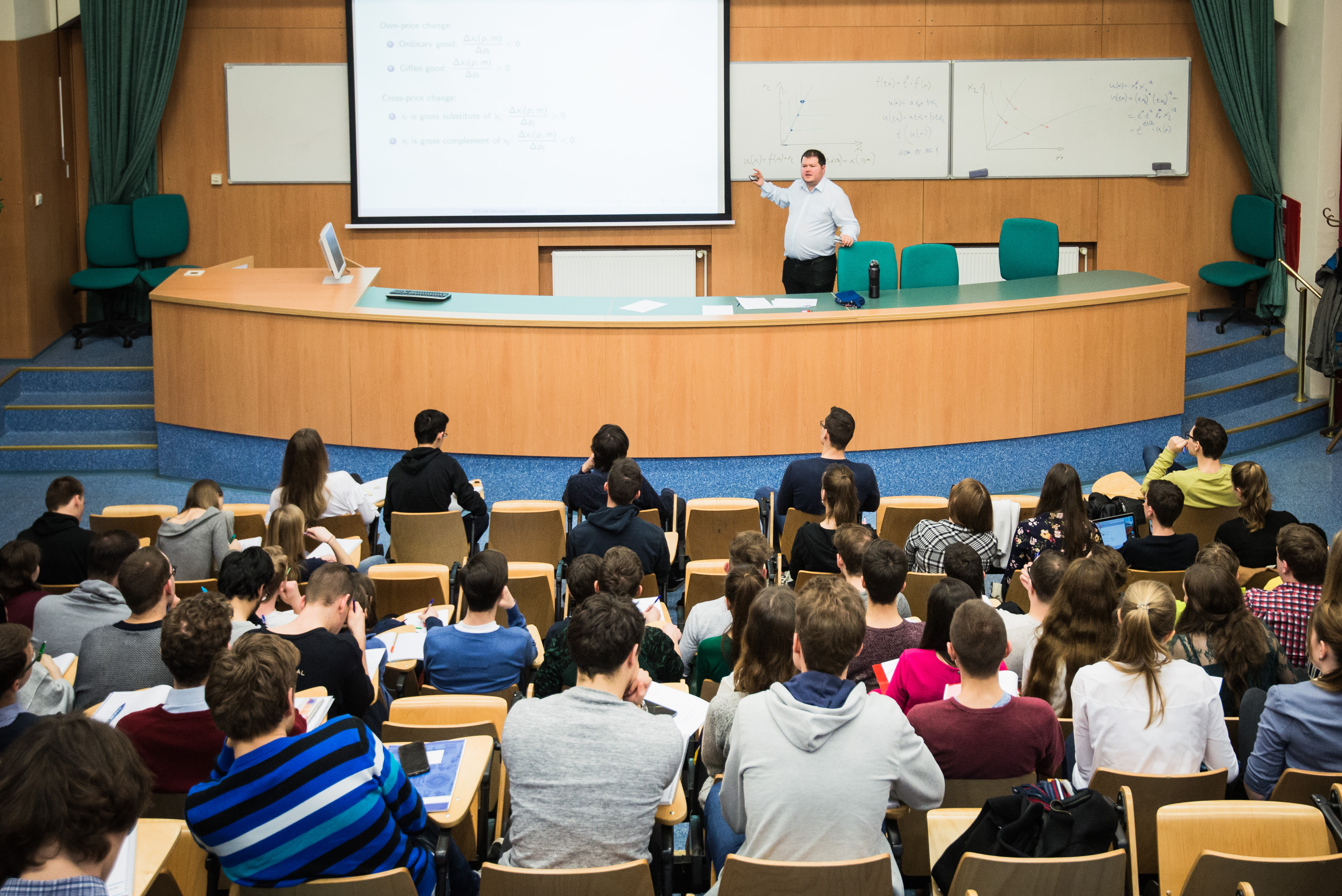
Classroom 109 at IES

Seven out of the top ten Czech economists belong to the IES.

- Tomáš Havránek – ranked 1st
- Evžen Kočenda – ranked 2nd
- Roman Horváth – ranked 3rd
- Zuzana Havránková (Note: née Iršová) – ranked 5th
- Jozef Baruník – ranked 6th
- Ladislav Krištoufek – ranked 9th
- Michal Bauer – ranked 10th

Other prominent faculty include Oldřich Dědek and Tomáš Holub, both associated with the Czech National Bank.
