= Pavel Žáček =

Czech historian, politician and publicist (born 1969)

Pavel Žáček MP
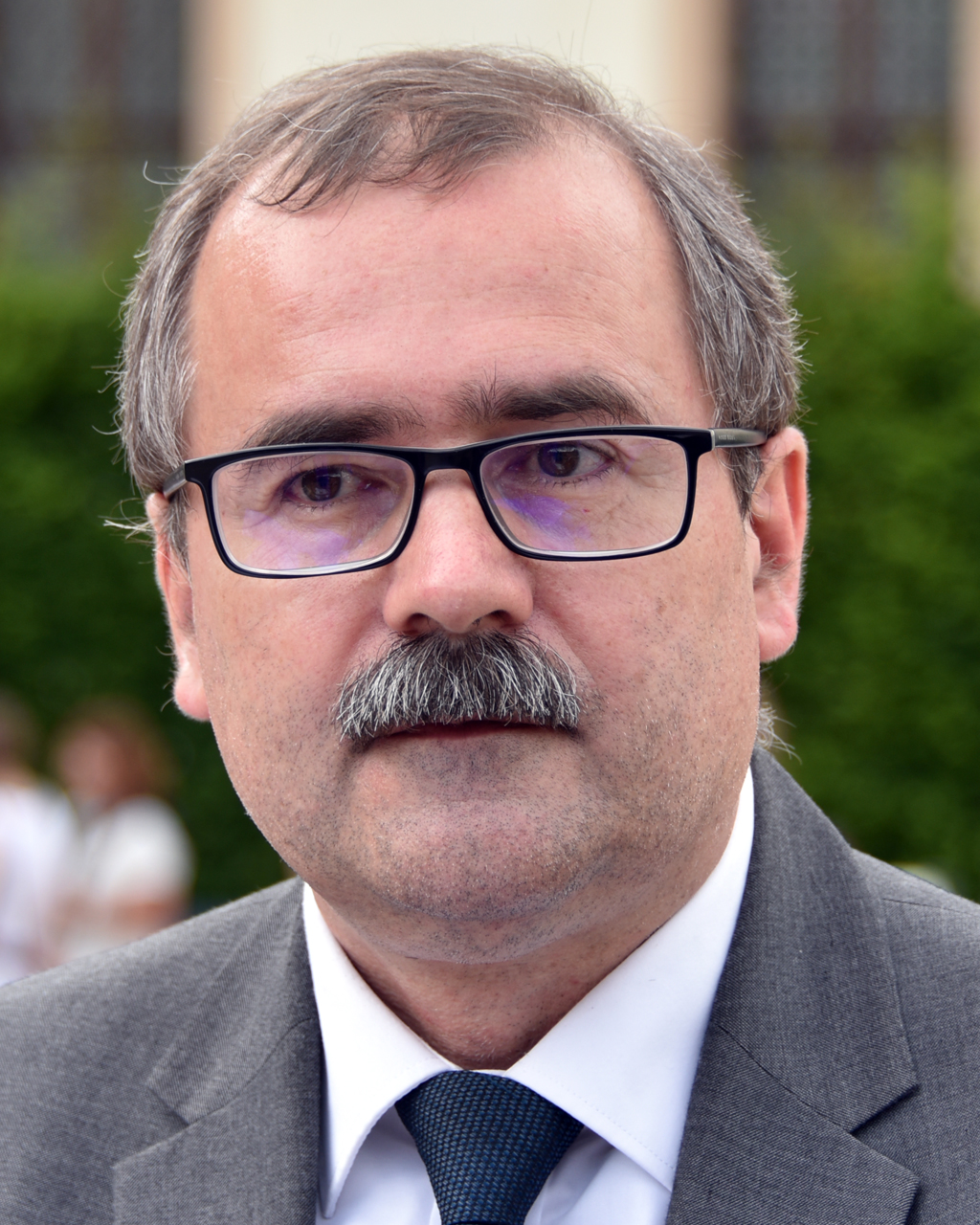

Member of the Chamber of Deputies
- Incumbent
- Assumed office 21 October 2017

Director of the Institute for the Study of Totalitarian Regimes
- In office 1 January 2008 – 31 March 2010
- Preceded by: office established
- Succeeded by: Jiří Pernes

Personal details
- Born: 18 May 1969 (age 56) Prague, Czechoslovakia
- Education: M.A. Mass Communication (1992); PhD Mass Communication (2001)
- Alma mater: Charles University
- Occupation: historian

Pavel Žáček (born 18 May 1969) is a Czech academic and politician who served as the first Director of the Institute for the Study of Totalitarian Regimes, the Czech government agency and research institute tasked with investigation of the crimes of the Communist regime of Czechoslovakia that was declared to be criminal in 1993. In 2017, he was elected to the Chamber of Deputies and serves as a Civic Democratic MP.

== Education and early career ==
He holds an M.A. (1992) and a PhD (2001) in Mass Communication from Faculty of Social Sciences, Charles University. He worked for the Office for the Documentation and the Investigation of the Crimes of Communism from 1993, where he was appointed Deputy Director in 1998. From 1999 to 2006, he was Senior Researcher at the Institute of Contemporary History, Academy of Sciences of the Czech Republic.

== Career ==
He was a member of the Czech Television Council 2001–2003. He is a founding signatory of the Prague Declaration on European Conscience and Communism. In 2010, he was succeeded as Director by Jiří Pernes. He served as adviser to Daniel Herman who was elected director of the Institute in August 2010. After a dispute about Herman's removal in April 2013, Pavel Žáček was fired by the new director Pavla Foglová.

A collection of Žáček's papers, including transcripts of interrogations of Czech secret police personnel and documents about Václav Havel, is held in the collection of the Hoover Institution.
