= Security Services Archive =

Archive in the Czech Republic

Security Services Archive Archiv bezpečnostních složek
- Interactive map of Security Services Archive; Archiv bezpečnostních složek
- 50°05′01″N 14°26′36″E
- Alternative name: SSA
- Location: Siwiecova 2428/2, Prague, Czech Republic
- Established: 1 February 2008; 18 years ago
- Affiliation: ÚSTR
- Director: Miroslav Urbánek
- Employees: 150
- Website: abscr.cz/en/

The Security Services Archive (SSA; Czech: Archiv bezpečnostních složek) is an archive administered by the Institute for the Study of Totalitarian Regimes (ÚSTR), in order to allow public access to the historical documents of the Nazi and communist security forces in the Czech lands.

== History ==
The idea of an archive to allow research into the history of totalitarianism in Czechoslovakia was first proposed in 2005. The SSA was then legally established as part of the ÚSTR.

== Holdings ==
The SSA contains the archival collections of the Ministry of the Interior, primarily consisting of documents from the State Security (StB) and Public Security services of the Sbor národní bezpečnosti. It also holds collection of the Border Guard and Interior Guard, the Ministry of the Interior, and the prison system amongst others.

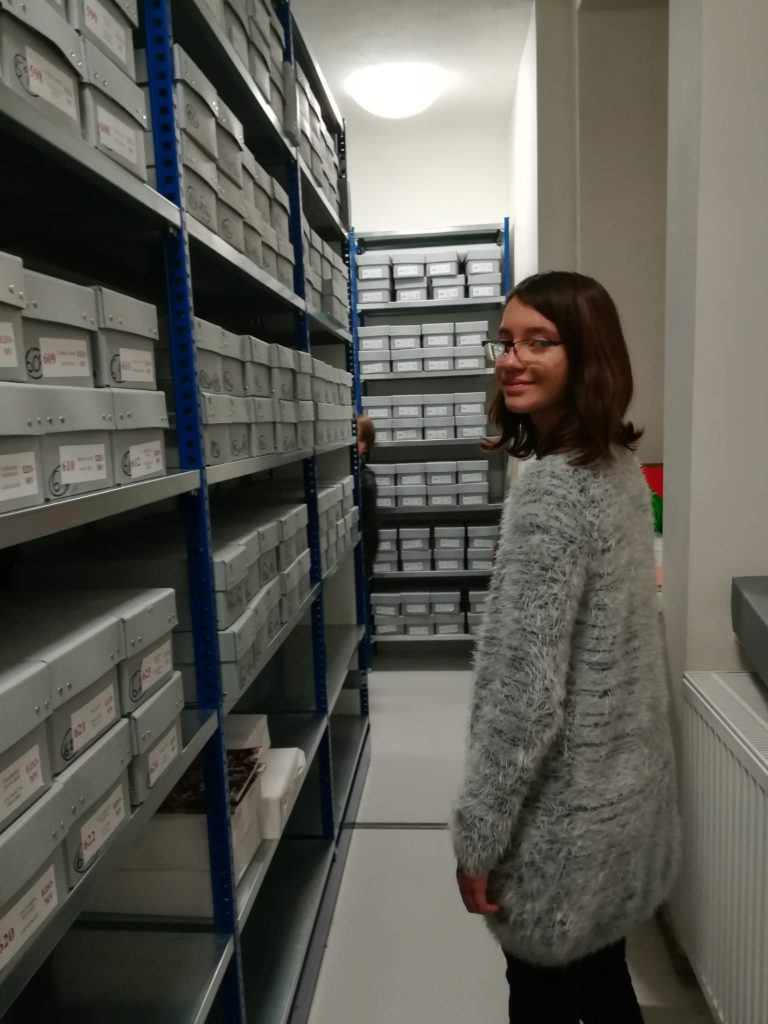
A student in the archive stores

== Research and revelations ==
During his time as leader of the Labour Party, Jeremy Corbyn was falsely accused by several British tabloids of having been a Soviet spy and cooperating with the StB. Reported in the Daily Express, Daily Mail, The Daily Telegraph, and The Sun, the accusations were claimed to be based on evidence from the SSA and the testimony of a former StB agent. However, an interview with the latter conducted by Nový čas contradicted the primary evidence, and further investigations into the material held on Corbyn at the SSA proved the original accusations to be a hoax.

Research by historians at the SSA has uncovered the links between the Communist Party of Czechoslovakia and the Progressive Party of Working People in Cyprus from the 1950s. The Czechoslovak intelligence services maintained contacts with Cypriot student organisations, the police, and politicians, including the Presidential secretary, with the latter operating between the 1970s and 1980s with the tacit consent of President Makarios III.

In 2021, the Daily Mail reported that a Czech astrophysicist at the University of Oxford had been in the pay of the StB, based on archival records at the SSA. It has been predicted that further such cases will come to light as documents continue to become declassified at the archive.
