= Protection of Czechoslovak borders during the Cold War =

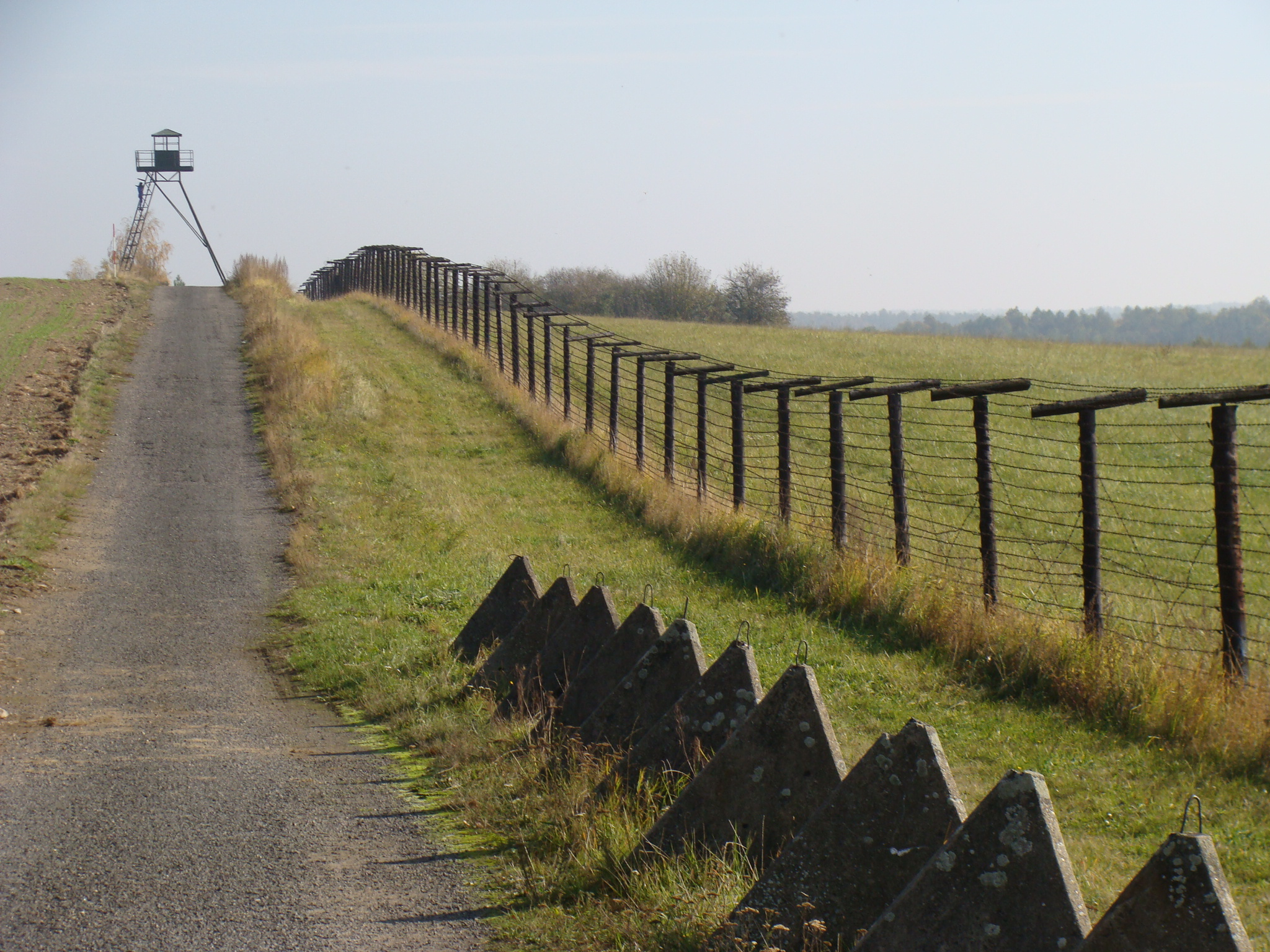
A preserved fence with watchtower near Čížov (2009)

The protection of borders between the Czechoslovak Socialist Republic (ČSSR) and several of the Western Bloc countries of Western Europe, namely with Germany and Austria, in the Cold War era and especially after 1951, was provided by special troops of the Pohraniční Stráž (lit. 'the Border Guard') and a system of engineer equipment which created the real "Iron Curtain". The purpose was to prevent citizens of the Eastern Bloc escaping to the West, although official reports stated it was to keep the enemy's spies and saboteurs out of Czechoslovakia. The border system of Czechoslovakia was not as elaborate and fortified as that of the Inner German border or the Berlin Wall, but it was considered difficult to cross the border undetected.

== History and development ==
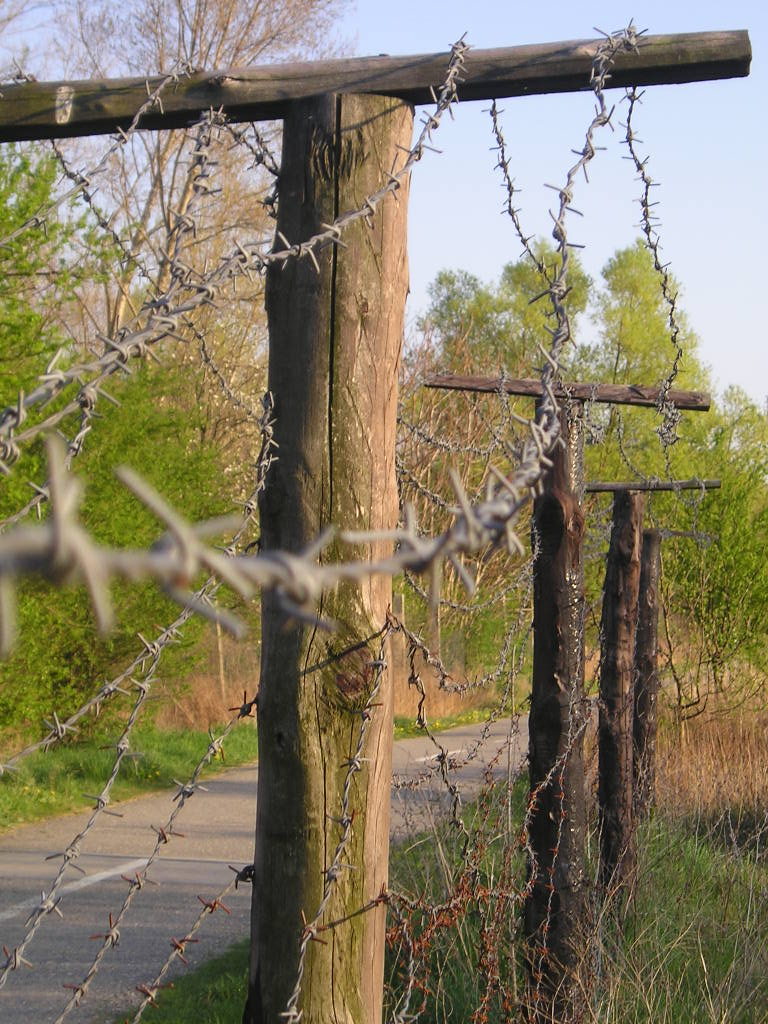
Part of the former "iron curtain" in Devínska Nová Ves, Bratislava

After the Second World War the original borders of Czechoslovakia were restored and special police units (SNB) were established to protect the borders together with the army. At this time the main goal of the border protection force was to ensure that the expelled German civil population of the border areas (3.6 million people) could not return, thus stabilising the situation after the ethnic cleansing of the formerly German inhabited border areas. Therefore, some hundred empty villages in the border areas had been razed to the ground to create an uninhabited easily controlled border strip. Following the 1948 Communist takeover in the government, thousands of opponents of the communist regime tried to escape the country. For individuals or small groups it was quite easy to avoid the guards and cross the borders, though it was dangerous if they were spotted, as the guards were allowed to shoot escapees on sight. About 10,000 people, including 50 prominent politicians, crossed the borders in the first year after the political change.

Subsequently, an independent HQ of Border Guard was created, but the number of staff was nearly the same (about 6,000 men) as the detection of potential emigrants by regular police was preferred. The so-called "forbidden zone" was established up to 2 kilometres (1.2 mi) from the border in which no civilians could reside. A wider region, so called "border zone" also existed, up to 12 kilometres (7.5 mi) from the border, in which no "disloyal" or "suspect" civilians could reside or work. For example, the entire Aš-Bulge creating the most problematic part of the border territory fell within the border zone.

Substantial changes occurred by the end of 1951, after several successful mass escapes. The Border Guard was reorganised into two brigades with headquarters in Cheb and Znojmo, and the number of members increased to 17,000. Finally, the real defence measures by means of engineer equipment was built. From 1951 onwards, this area was guarded by a signal fence some kilometres inside the border, while the border itself was secured by a guarded strip with a single barbed wire fence. This fence, originally an electric fence with a voltage of 5000 V, was replaced starting in 1968 by a double wire mesh fence similar to that used on the Inner German border. In addition, the border was fitted with watch towers. In contrast with the concrete towers used in East Germany, these towers were usually made of wood or steel. In some areas several types of land mines were used, notably the PP Mi-Ba, PP Mi-D, and PP Mi.

The barrier typically lay around 100 metres (330 ft) inside the actual boundary line. As the fence was not visible from there at some places, curious or careless West German strollers often overlooked border markers and mistakenly entered Czechoslovak territory, leading to their arrest.

Occurrences such as the autumn 1989 drama at the West German embassy in Prague, where thousands of East Germans were hiding, wore down the patience of the Czechoslovak authorities, who eventually gave in and allowed all East Germans to travel directly to West Germany from 3 November 1989, thus breaking the Iron Curtain.

On 17 November 1989, the Velvet Revolution took place. The barbed wire on the borders with East Germany and Austria was removed from 5 December onward, and from 11 December the Czechoslovak fortifications on the West German border were dismantled.

The Czech Republic, Slovakia (which was established after the 1993 disestablishment of Czechoslovakia), Germany and Austria are now all part of the Schengen Agreement, which allows border crossing without identity checks.

== Deaths on the border ==
According to estimates, over a thousand people died between the Czech–German and Czech–Austrian border between May 1945 and November 1989.

=== Civilians killed ===
Confirmed deaths on the Czech border by country of origin between 1948 and 1989
Country of origin	to West Germany	to Austria	to East Germany	Total
Czechoslovakia	105	73	9	187
Poland	4	25	0	29
GDR (SBZ)	10	3	3	16
Austria	0	15	0	15
West Germany	12	1	0	13
Hungary	1	6	0	7
Unknown	5	2	0	7
Yugoslavia	1	3	0	4
France	0	1	0	1
Morocco	1	0	0	1
Total:	139	129	12	280

This includes an estimated 390 civilians, the majority of whom died in intentional attempts to escape. Occasionally, civilians died in accidental border crossings, or simply as the result of accidents. The number of civilian fatalities between May 1945 and January 1948 is unclear, but is estimated to be around 80-110. This relatively high number is a result of the high volume of people smuggling that took place during the period. Furthermore, many of the Germans expelled from Czechoslovakia sought to return to their old homes to retrieve property or visit friends and relatives in their homeland.

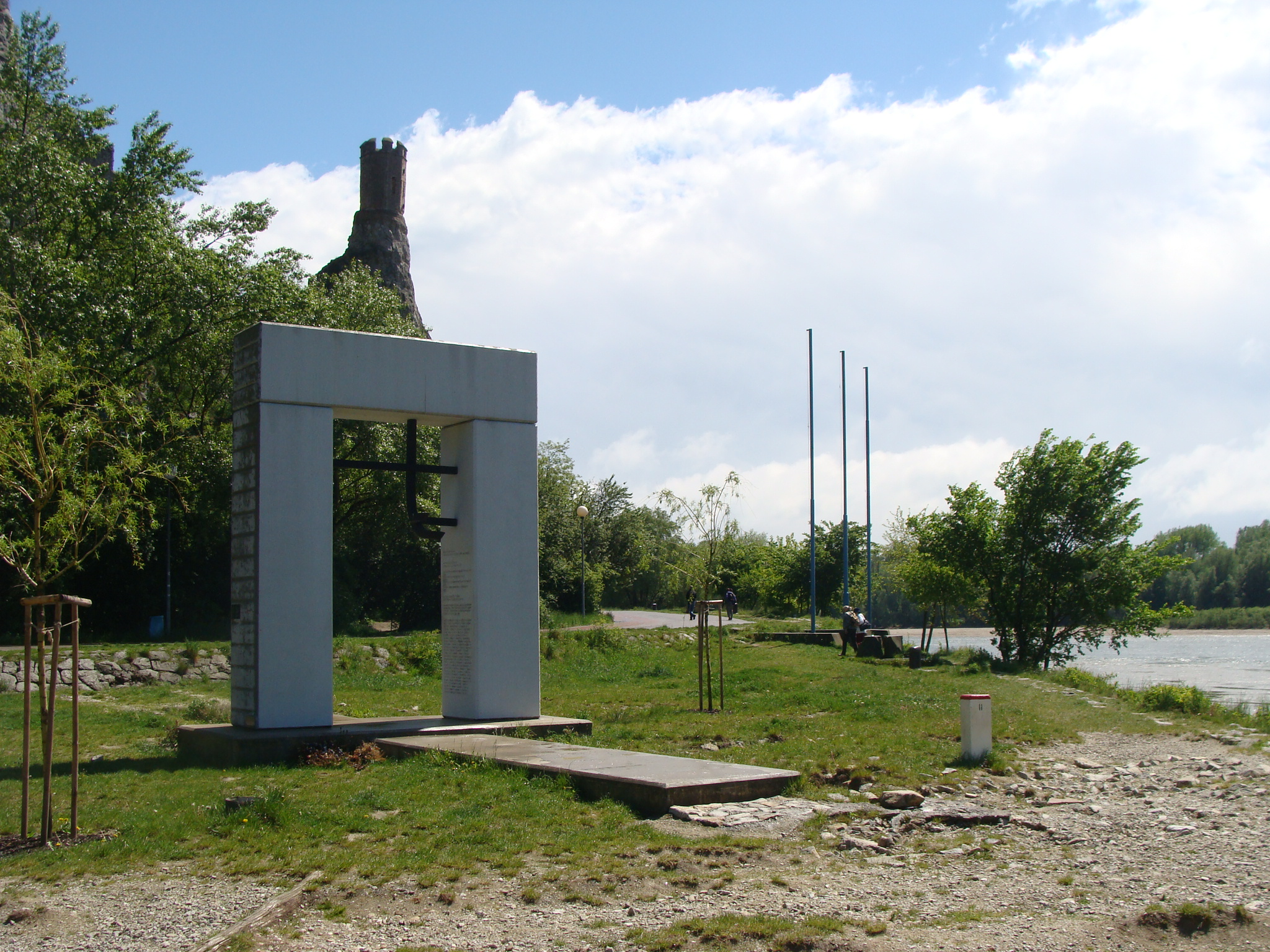
Memorial to those killed in the Czechoslovak border, situated below Devín Castle, Slovakia

Between 1948 and 1989, 280 people are reported to have died across Czechoslovakia's borders with both the West and the German Democratic Republic. Many of these were deserting soldiers.

Deaths by border region:

- 139 people on the West German border,
- 129 people on the Austrian border (40 of whom died on what is now the Slovak border), and
- 12 people on the East German border (with the last recorded death in 1963).

Of the 280 killed on the border:

- 143 people were shot,
- 95 people were electrocuted by the border fence
- 17 people killed themselves to evade arrest
- 11 people drowned attempting to swim across water borders (although there are 50 further deaths by drowning in these areas which are not officially attributed to border crossings)
- 5 people were killed when their aircraft was shot down
- 5 people died in motor accidents relating to border crossings
- 2 people were killed by mines
- 1 person died of a heart attack before being arrested by border troops
- 1 person was torn apart by guard dogs on the border

== See also ==
- Czechoslovak border fortifications during the Cold War
- Velvet Revolution: key events of the following weeks.
- Operation Border Stone
