= Alsetex 410 =

Stun grenade

The Alsetex 410 is a stun grenade manufactured by the French company Alsetex.

== Main characteristics ==
- The intense sound (160 decibels, measured at 15 metres) causes temporary deafness
- Employed in a closed space, the Alsetex 410 Splinterless stun hand grenade has no destructive effect on the surroundings
- The body and igniter fuze are made of special plastic material and generate no splinters

=== Dimensions ===
- Diameter 50 mm
- Length 129 mm
- Gross weight 58 gr
