= Rapid Response Unit =

Czech police tactical unit

Útvar rychlého nasazení
- Active: 1981–present
- Country: Czech Republic
- Agency: Policie České republiky
- Type: Police tactical unit
- Operations jurisdiction: National
- Motto: S rozumem a odvahou With Reason and Courage
- Abbreviation: URNA

Structure
- Officers: Approx. 100

The Rapid Response Unit (URNA) (Czech: Útvar rychlého nasazení) is the tactical unit of the Police of the Czech Republic (Czech: Policie České republiky) that specialises in air assault and airborne operations, counterterrorism and hostage rescue crisis management, high-risk tactical special operations, quick response to emergencies with SWAT unit tactics, and VIP protection. It is under the command of the Ministry of the Interior.

== Mission ==
The unit's missions primarily involve apprehension of armed and dangerous criminals, counterterrorism and hostage rescue crisis management, VIP protection, high-risk tactical law enforcement situations, operations in difficult terrain, protecting high-level meeting areas, providing security in areas at risk of attack or terrorism, special reconnaissance in difficult to access and dangerous areas, and crowd and riot control.

== History ==
In 1981, the Útvar zvláštního určení (ÚZU) (Special purpose unit) was established in 1981 as part of the Sbor národní bezpečnosti (SNB) (English: National Security Corps) with its members recruited from airborne units and issued with red berets. In 1985, the unit was renamed Odbor zvláštního určení (OZU). After the Velvet Revolution in 1989, the unit was renamed Jednotka rychlého zásahu Federální policejní služby (JRZ FPS) (Rapid response unit of Federal police service) and it members issued with green berets. In 1992, the unit was renamed the Rapid response unit and in 1993 it members were issued red berets.

The unit conducts about 40 operations a year and has served internationally including in Afghanistan, Iraq and Pakistan providing protection to Czech embassies. Members of the unit have served in the United Nations Interim Administration Mission in Kosovo (UNIMIK) in Kosovo as part of Special Team Six.

== Organization ==
The Rapid response unit is divided into three sections:

1. Rapid Deployment Section – consists of three intervention groups (Specialists, Pyrotechnists, Training Group).

2. Special Services Section – consists of members with specific specializations such as snipers, signalman, negotiators, drivers.

3. Administrative and Logistics Section – provides organizational, material and staffing, including the secretariat, a lawyer and administrative staff.

== Training ==
Members of the Czech Police with at least three years of service (or an academic degree) can join the URNA. The basis is a special-tactical training, shooting preparation, work at heights and self defense along with airborne and topographical and medical training. URNA practices with foreign units such as 22 SAS, GSG9, GIGN, etc.

Required properties are as follows:

a) Intelligence – Average to above average. The ability to learn. Define and solve problems in stressful environments.

b) Ambition and self-discipline – know your own abilities, work on yourself.

c) Flexibility and adaptability – unconventional thinking, inventiveness, ability to improvise.

d) Maturity – it is intended behavior devoid of impulsiveness, naivety, exaggeration, internal discipline.

e) Psychosomatic stability – related to emotional stability. The candidate should not be subject to psychosomatic problems.

f) Emotional stability – patience, the ability to withstand criticism.

g) Emotional mood – optimism, sense of humor, without sudden fluctuations.

h) Social adaptability – friendly and open meeting, respect to authority, adopt rules of group.

i) Aggression and courage – to show targeted and controllable aggression. Courage with self-preservation, no stunt.

j) High frustration tolerance – the ability to remain operational and focused on meeting targets during break, waiting and disturbing influences.

k) Sense of justice, honesty, conscientiousness and positive motivation to work.

== Equipment ==
| Model | Type | Origin | Cartridge | Notes |
|---|---|---|---|---|
| CZ 75B | Semi-automatic pistol | Czech Republic | 9×19mm Parabellum | Replaced by Glock in 2005 |
| Beretta 92FS | Semi-automatic pistol | Italy | 9×19mm Parabellum | Complemented the CZ 75B |
| Walther P99 | Semi-automatic pistol | Germany | 9×19mm Parabellum | Was issued alongside Glock 17 around 2005, now out of service |
| Glock 17 | Semi-automatic pistol | Austria | 9×19mm Parabellum | Replaced CZ and Beretta pistols around 2005. Gen 5 is currently issued with Streamlight TLR-2 flashlight with visible laser |
| Glock 26 | Semi-automatic pistol | Austria | 9×19mm Parabellum | Issued for concealed carry and as a backup weapon |
| CZ Vz.61 Škorpion | Submachine gun / PDW | Czech Republic | 7.65mm Browning | Standard issue until 1990s, when it was replaced by H&K MP5 |
| FN P90 | Submachine gun / PDW | Belgium | 5.7×28mm | Supplemented the MP5 in very small quantities, nowadays replaced by the H&K MP7A1 |
| Heckler & Koch MP5 | Submachine gun / PDW | Germany | 9×19mm Parabellum | Numerous variants (A5, SD6, MP5K, MP5-PDW) used. Currently being succeeded by H&K MP7A1 |
| Heckler & Koch MP7A1 | Submachine gun / PDW | Germany | 4.6×30mm | Replacing / heavily complementing the MP5 |
| SA vz. 58 | Assault rifle | Czech Republic | 7.62×39mm | Former standard-issue rifle for foreign operations; updated around early 2000s with FAB Defense accessories such as telescopic stock and handguard with 1913 MIL-STD rails; replaced by the G36 rifles |
| Heckler & Koch G36K | Assault rifle | Germany | 5.56×45mm NATO | Formed a transition from older 7.62x39mm SA Vz.58 rifle to NATO 5.56mm standard. Unit used the G36K and G36C variant with various attachments |
| Heckler & Koch HK416A5 | Assault rifle | Germany | 5.56×45mm NATO | Current primary weapon issued to every unit operator. Mostly issued with EOTech EXPS 3.0 holographic sight and Steiner D-BAL IR laser module, other accessories are specific to each operator's choice |
| Benelli M3-T | Shotgun | Italy | .12 Gauge (12/76) | M3T variant with wire folding stock was used for door breaching techniques. Mostly out of service |
| SVD Dragunov | Sniper rifle | Soviet Union | 7.62×54mmR | Standard sniper rifle until early 1990s. Paired with PSO-1 4x24mm scope |
| SIG SSG-3000 | Sniper rifle | Switzerland | 7.62×51mm NATO | Replaced the SVD. Used with Hensoldt 1-6x42mm scope until being replaced by SAKO TRG series rifles |
| Heckler & Koch HK417 | Sniper rifle | Germany | 7.62×51mm NATO | Used as a sniper support rifle and helicopter work. Also used in shorter 13' inch barrel configuration |
| Sako TRG 22 | Sniper rifle | Finland | 7.62×51mm NATO | Still used by Czech Police regional SWAT units. Replaced within URNA by AI AXMC rifles. Usually paired with Schmidt & Bender scope. TRG-22 model was often used with folding stock |
| Sako TRG 42 | Sniper rifle | Finland | .338 Lapua Magnum | Still used by Czech Police regional SWAT units. Replaced within URNA by AI AXMC rifles. Usually paired with Schmidt & Bender scope. |
| Accuracy International AXMC | Sniper rifle | United Kingdom | 7.62×51mm NATO .338 Lapua Magnum | Currently used sniper rifles chambered in 7.62mm NATO (AI AX308) or .338 Lapua Magnum (AXMC). Used with NightForce ATACR scope |
| FN Minimi | Machine gun | Belgium | Current | Bought in small number for foreign operations |
| Heckler & Koch HK69A1 | Grenade launcher | Germany | Current | Mostly used for training with various types of ammo |

- Nomex gloves
- Zeveta P1 Flashbang
  - After explosion, 14 small explosives disperse to all directions and each one provides flash and sound effect
- NICO BTV-1 flash-bang grenade
