= Operation Border Stone =

Intelligence operation of Czechoslovakia during the Cold War

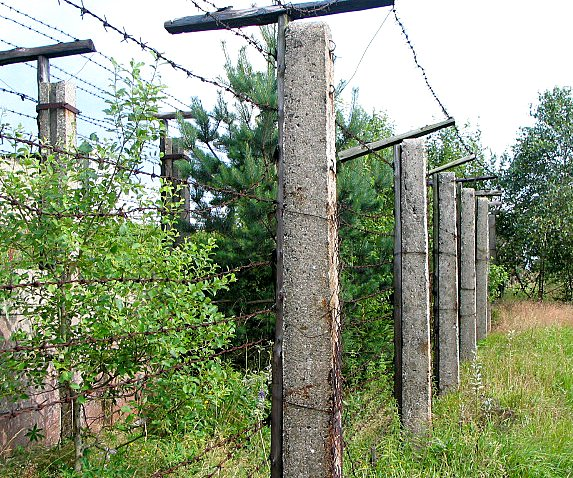
Iron Curtain in Czech Republic 2007

Operation Border Stone, also known as Operation Kamen (Czech: Akce Kámen) was an operation of the intelligence services of the Czechoslovak Republic during the Cold War, lasting from 1948 to 1951. According to some sources, the operation continued until 1958. Its goal was to capture citizens who attempted to defect from socialist Czechoslovakia to West Germany, across the Iron Curtain. The plan was initiated in the aftermath of the 1948 Czechoslovak coup d'etat, in which the Communist Party of Czechoslovakia, with Soviet backing, seized control of the government of Czechoslovakia.

== Background ==
After the communist coup of February 1948, thousands of opponents of the communist regime tried to escape the country. Although the border was guarded, in the year after the coup approximately 10,000 people -- including 50 prominent politicians -- escaped. In response to this, the Czechoslovak secret police, also known by the Czech acronym StB, set up parts of the country's border fortifications about 50 km away from the actual border with the American occupation zone in West Germany. The idea of using a false border to catch defecting refugees has been traced to Antonín Prchal, a colonel of the StB.

== Implementation ==
False border crossings were constructed in the areas of Aš, Cheb, Mariánské Lázně, Chodský Újezd, Domažlice, Kdyně, and Všeruby. The false crossings consisted of signs, border stones, administrative buildings, and guardhouses. Similar arrangements had been used by the Gestapo of Nazi Germany and the NKVD of the Soviet Union.

The StB used the fake border crossings to catch and arrest would-be refugees who believed they had crossed into the safety of West Germany. In many cases, the victims had been encouraged to flee the country by undercover StB agents posing as members of the underground anti-communist opposition. At the fake border post, the refugees were introduced to another StB agent posing as a smuggler or a bribed border guard, who offered to lead the refugees into the forest and across the border at night in exchange for payment. After crossing the fake border, refugees were welcomed and interviewed by supposed agents of the US Counter Intelligence Corps. In these interviews the refugees were asked about their connections to and knowledge of the anti-communist opposition in Czechoslovakia; in many cases, the refugees willingly told the "Americans" about members of their family or social circle who would support the overthrow of the communist regime, in the belief that the Americans could provide assistance to those family or friends. In this way the StB learned the identities of other opponents of communist rule, who were imprisoned along with the would-be refugees.

After the interviews with the fake American agents, the operation could follow different scripts. In most cases, refugees were instructed to bring transcripts of their interviews to another American post. On their way the refugees would be discovered and arrested by Czechoslovak border guards. Once caught in this way, the refugees could not claim to be innocent, since they carried signed statements describing their anti-communist views and activities. Many victims believed that every stage of the operation was genuine, and their capture was a result of straying too close to the Czechoslovak border after getting lost in the forest on the West German side.

In some other cases, the StB agents posing as Americans would inform the refugees that their asylum applications had been rejected, and turn them over to the Czechoslovak border guards. This was done so that, when these attempted refugees returned to Czechoslovakia, they would spread the news that they had been betrayed by the US. The spread of such news in prisons and in the rest of society was intended to convince the population that the US was not genuinely supportive of the anti-communist cause and that there was no hope of successful escape.

Regardless of how the operation proceeded, the victims were sentenced to prison or hard labor. Some received life sentences, and some were sentenced to death; others were released after sentences of 15-20 years. In many cases, the victims' property and possessions were confiscated by the StB officers involved, who sold these for personal gain.

== End of the Operation ==
The US learned of the false border operation from Stanislav Liska, the chief of police in Všeruby, who since 1945 had been part of a network in Czechoslovakia sharing intelligence with the US. The operation was shut down after Radio Free Europe broadcast a warning about it in 1951, although some sources state that the operation continued in some form for another seven years.

== Sources ==
- Václava Jandečková, Secret State Police Operations in Cold War Czechoslovakia. Operation KÁMEN and the Jan Masaryk Case, Studies in Intelligence History, LIT Verlag, Curych 2021, ISBN 978-3-643-91361-6
- Václava Jandečková, Fingierte Grenze - Aktion "KÁMEN". Opfer und Täter geheimer Grenzoperationen der Tschechoslowakischen Staatssicherheit 1948-1951, Studies in Intelligence History, LIT Verlag, Münster 2021, ISBN 978-3-643-25015-5
- Václava Jandečková, Kámen: Svědectví hlavního aktéra akce „Falešné hranice“ u Všerub na Domažlicku, 2. rozšířené vydání / Stone: testimony of the main actor of the action "False borders" at Všeruby in Domažlice region, 2nd expanded edition, Nakladatelství Českého lesa 2022
- Václava Jandečková, Fingierte Grenze - Aktion "KÁMEN". Opfer und Täter geheimer Grenzoperationen der Tschechoslowakischen Staatssicherheit 1948-1951, Band 2, LIT Verlag, Münster 2022, ISBN 978-3-643-25048-3
- Václava Jandečková (Text), Michal Kocián (Illustrations), Operation KÁMEN – False Border, a graphic novel, LIT Verlag, Münster 2023, ISBN 978-3-643-91448-4
- Václava Jandečková, Fingierte Grenze - Aktion "KÁMEN". Opfer und Täter geheimer Grenzoperationen der Tschechoslowakischen Staatssicherheit 1948-1951, Band 3, LIT Verlag, Münster 2024, ISBN 978-3-643-25123-7

== See also ==
- Protection of Czechoslovak borders during the Cold War
