= Domeček =

Former small prison in Prague

Coordinates: 50°05′23.9″N 14°23′31.6″E

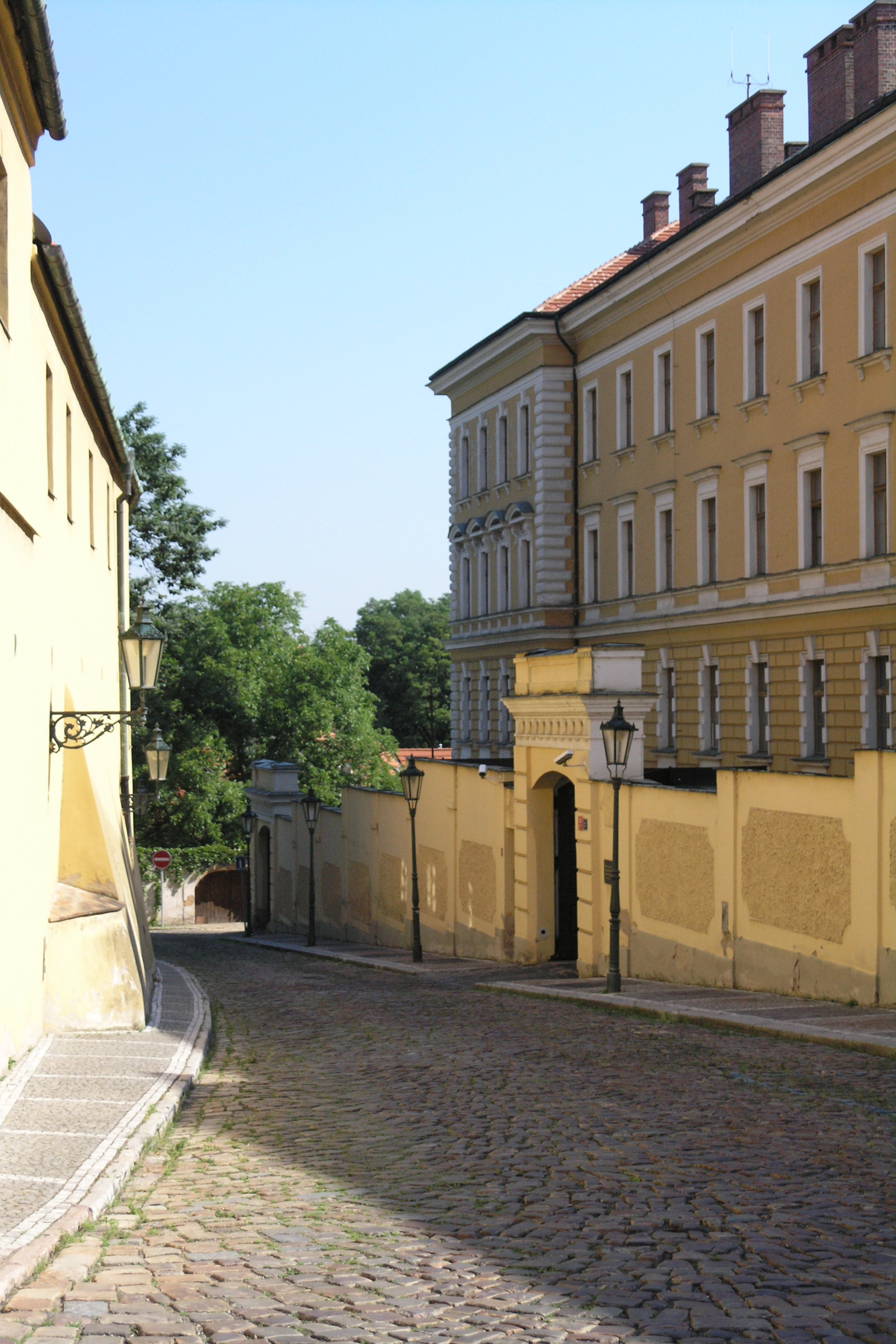

Domeček (or Hradčanský domeček) is an informal name for a former small prison in Hradčany, district of Prague. The name in Czech means 'small house' and refers to the size of the building.

Domeček, placed next to the building of a military court, had served as a military prison during the Austro-Hungarian period. It was used by the Gestapo during World War II and since 1948 the Czechoslovak security service (StB) employed it as a secret prison. It hosted 30 solitary cells.

StB used the place for torture of political opponents, among them the officers of the pre-war army or members of the anti-nazi resistance.
