= Institute for the Study of Totalitarian Regimes =

Czech government agency and research institute

- Ústav pro studium totalitních režimů
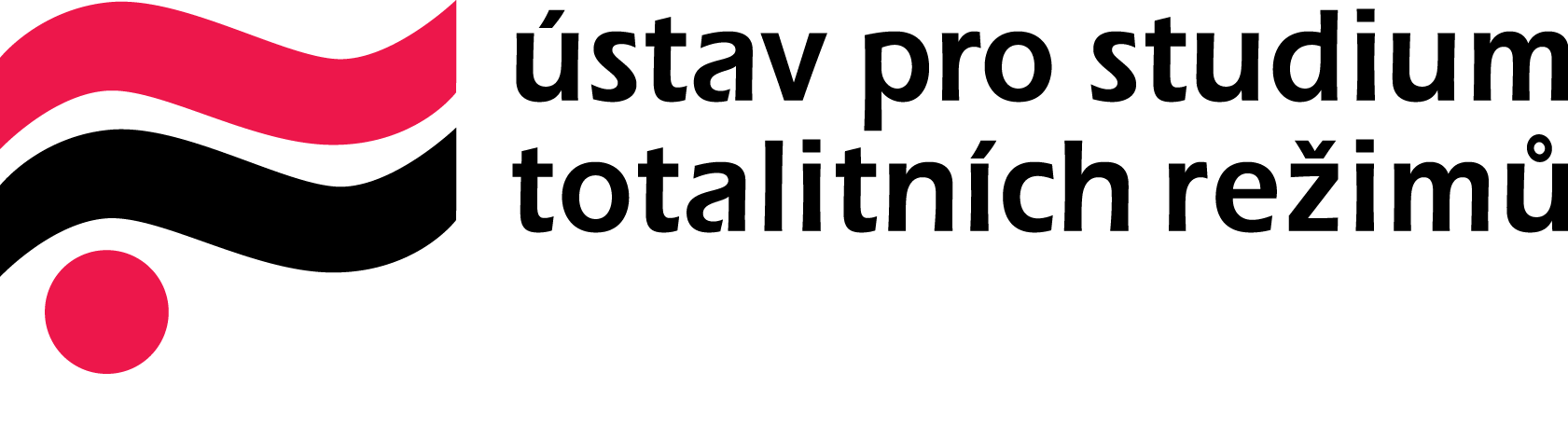

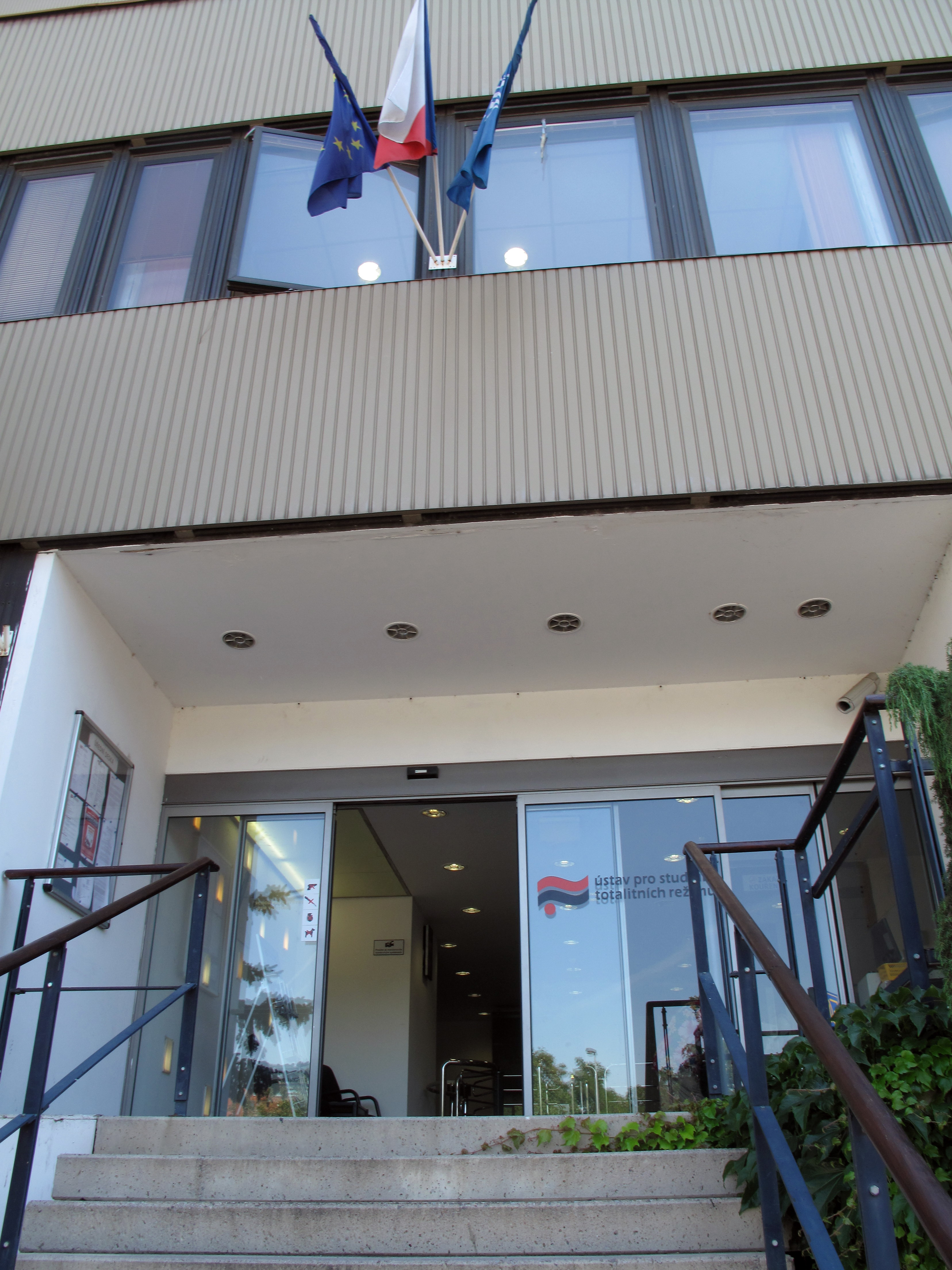
- Formation: 2007
- Type: Government agency and research institute
- Location: Prague, Czech Republic
- Coordinates: 50°5′0.98″N 14°26′36.29″E
- Director: Ladislav Kudrna (historik)
- Affiliations: Platform of European Memory and Conscience
- Website: ustrcr.cz

The Institute for the Study of Totalitarian Regimes (Czech: Ústav pro studium totalitních režimů or ÚSTR) is a Czech government agency and research institute. It was founded by the Czech government in 2007 and is situated at Siwiecova street, Prague-Žižkov (the street is named after Ryszard Siwiec).

Its purpose is to gather, analyse and make accessible documents from the Nazi and Communist totalitarian regimes. Its Security Services Archive also has documents from the former communist secret police, the StB or State Security. The institute is a founding member organisation of the Platform of European Memory and Conscience, and hosts its secretariat.

== Exhibitions ==
The institute shows exhibitions from other countries and has developed its own touring exhibitions. "Prague Through the Lens of the Secret Police" was first shown in 2009 at the Permanent Representation of the Czech Republic to the European Union in Brussels; it was reviewed in the Harvard Gazette, in which Mark Kramer, a fellow and director at the Harvard Project on Cold War Studies commented on the extent to which the communist regime monitored ordinary people. "The Czech secret police went to great lengths to keep track of people who were perfectly innocuous. These weren’t terrorists. They weren’t dangers to the state."

== Controversies and criticism ==
Historians Péter Apor, Sándor Horváth and James Mark write that the institute is "closely tied to a right-wing anticommunist subculture".

=== Kundera controversy ===
In 2008, the Institute for the Study of Totalitarian Regimes received media attention when a researcher published a controversial claim that the writer Milan Kundera had been a police informant who, in 1950, gave information leading to the arrest of a guest in a student hall of residence. The arrested man, Miroslav Dvořáček, was sentenced to 22 years imprisonment as a spy. He served 14 years of his sentence, which included hard labour in a uranium mine.

The Institute endorsed the authenticity of the 1950 police report on which the account was based, but indicated that it was not possible to establish some key facts. Kundera denied his involvement saying, "I object in the strongest manner to these accusations, which are pure lies".

=== Raymond Mawby ===
In 2012, the BBC reported that one of its researchers, who visited Prague in connection with a programme about a putative Czech attempt to compromise Edward Heath, came across an extensive secret service file on Conservative MP Raymond Mawby. There was evidence that Mawby sold information to the Czechs in the 1960s, although as Mawby was deceased it was not possible to hear "his side" of the story.

== Directors ==
- Pavel Žáček (2008–2010)
- Jiří Pernes (2010)
- Zdeněk Hazdra (2010, acting)
- Daniel Herman (2010–2013)
- Pavla Foglová (2013–2014)
- Zdeněk Hazdra (2014–2022)
- Ladislav Kudrna (2022–present)

== See also ==
- Post Bellum Czech NGO which created oral history project Memory of Nation
- Platform of European Memory and Conscience
