= M84 stun grenade =

American less-lethal pyrotechnic

M84 Stun Grenade
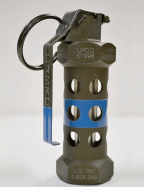
- M84 stun grenade
- Type: Stun grenade
- Place of origin: United States

Service history
- In service: 1995–present

Production history
- Designer: Picatinny Arsenal
- Designed: 1980s

Specifications
- Mass: 13.2 ounces (370 g)
- Length: 5.25 inches (133 mm)
- Diameter: 1.73 inches (44 mm)
- Filling: Magnesium/Ammonium Nitrate
- Filling weight: 0.16 ounces (4.5 g)
- Detonation mechanism: M201A1 time-delay fuse (1.0 to 2.3 seconds)
- Blast yield: 170–180 decibels and 6–8 million candelas within a 5-foot (1.5 m) radius

The M84 is a stun grenade ("flashbang") used by the United States Armed Forces and SWAT teams throughout the United States.

== Design ==
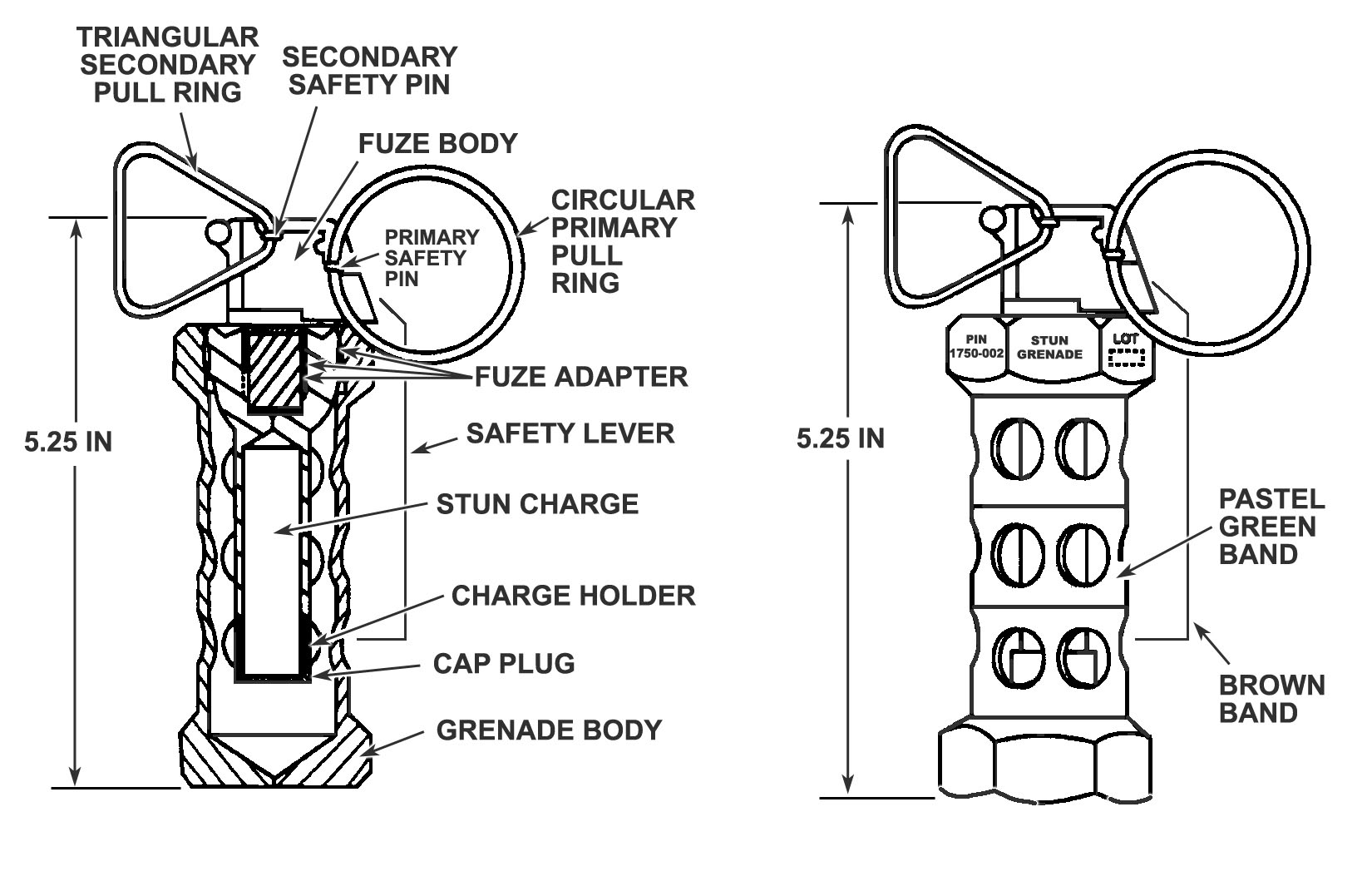

The M84 features a pyrotechnic metal-oxidant mix of magnesium and ammonium nitrate inside a thin aluminium case, contained within a perforated cast steel body.

Unlike the high explosives (HE) used in traditional ordnance, the pyrotechnic charge produces a subsonic deflagration, not a supersonic detonation, minimizing the blast effects.

On initiation, the auditory and visual elements of the deflagration are permitted to escape via the perforations in the cast outer body. This design minimizes the risk of collateral damage due to flame, blast, and unconsumed fragments of the inner case.

Upon deflagration, it emits an intensely loud "bang" of 170–180 decibels and a blinding flash of 4.5 million candelas within 5 feet (1.5 meters) of initiation, sufficient to cause immediate flash blindness, deafness, tinnitus, and inner ear disturbance. Exposed personnel experience disorientation, confusion and loss of coordination and balance. While these effects are all intended to be temporary, there is risk of permanent injury. Consequently, the M84 is classified as a less-lethal weapon.

It is intended to be thrown into enclosed spaces to distract and temporarily incapacitate enemy personnel for easier capture, or when risk of collateral damage during urban warfare or hostage rescue operations contravenes the employment of traditionally lethal and destructive fragmenting high explosive ordnance.

While the M84 is generally incapable of igniting paper or cloth, it can still ignite extremely flammable liquids or vapors (such as concentrated gasoline or ether fumes) in the immediate area of the grenade.

== Adoption ==
US Army doctrine calls for the M84 to be deployed "during building and room clearing operations, when the presence of noncombatants is likely or expected and the assault element is attempting to achieve surprise."
