= Daniel Herman =

Czech politician

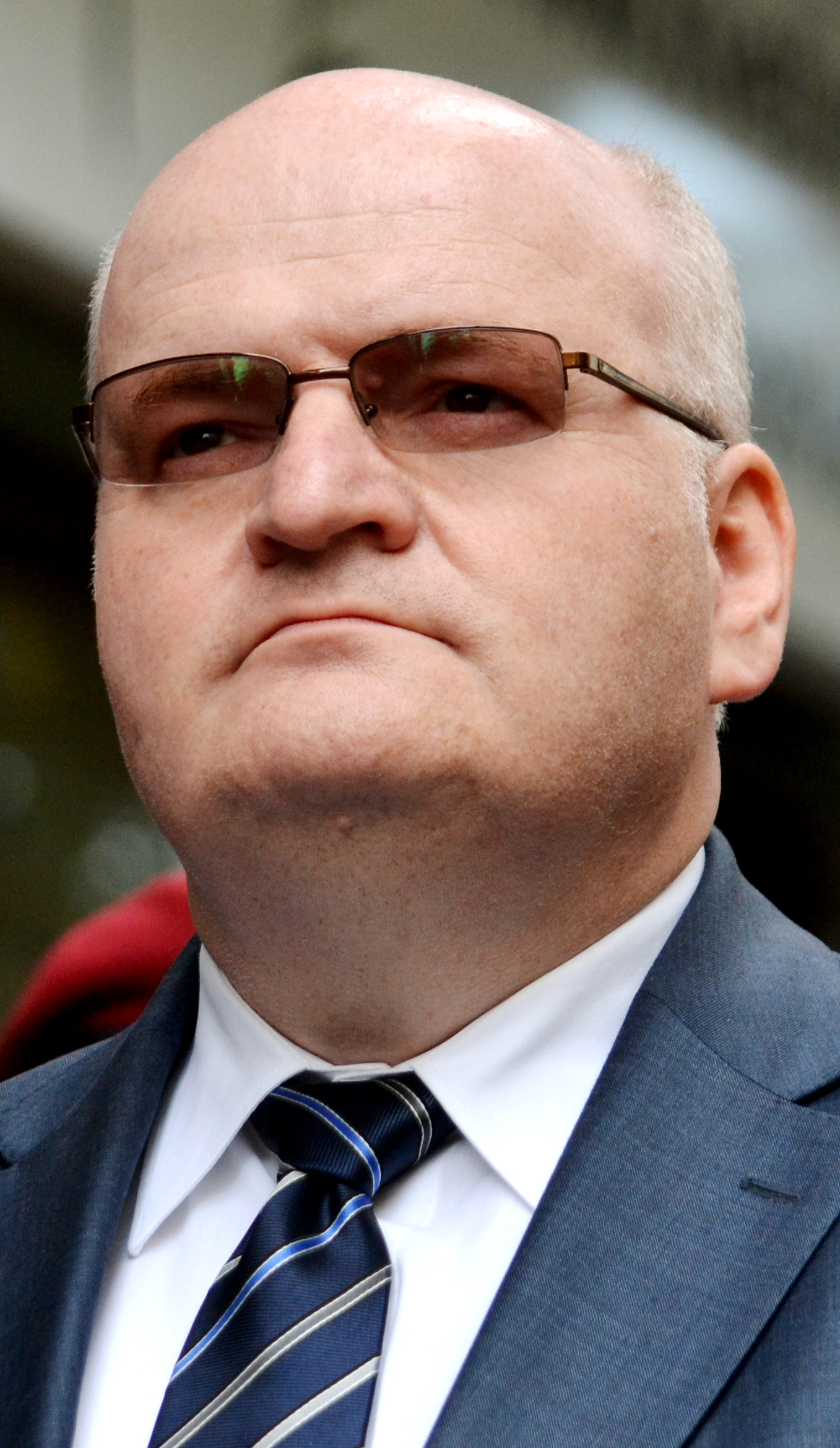

14th Minister of Culture of the Czech Republic
- In office 29 January 2014 – 13 December 2017
- Preceded by: Jiří Balvín
- Succeeded by: Ilja Šmíd

Member of the Chamber of Deputies
- In office 26 October 2013 – 26 October 2017

Personal details
- Born: 28 April 1963 (age 62) České Budějovice, Czechoslovakia
- Party: KDU-ČSL
- Occupation: Politician, priest

Daniel Herman (born 28 April 1963) is a Czech politician who served as the Minister of Culture of the Czech Republic in Bohuslav Sobotka's Cabinet from 2014 to 2017.

== Early life ==
He was born in České Budějovice. His mother was a cousin of Hana Brady. He began studying theology in Litoměřice in 1984. In 1989, he was ordained as a priest. He then became secretary to Miloslav Vlk. He was spokesman of the Czech Bishops' Conference 1996–2005. In 2007, he applied for laicization. He has since worked as a civil servant for the Ministry of the Interior and the Ministry of Culture. From 12 August 2010 to 10 April 2013, he was the Director of the Institute for the Study of Totalitarian Regimes. On 10 April 2013 he was dismissed as director of the Institute for the Study of Totalitarian Regimes, who they blamed for inefficiency and poor digitization of its materials. In response, he stated that his dismissal was the result of a political struggle and blamed the ČSSD and the Communist Party of Bohemia and Moravia for his dismissal. His successor, Pavla Foglová, stated he handed out bonuses equaling 903,000 and stated the institute's board would file a criminal complaint against him, accusations which he rejected.

== Minister of Culture ==
From January 2014 to December, 2017, he was Czech Minister of Culture in Bohuslav Sobotka's Cabinet.

In March 2016 preceding state visit of the President of PRC Xi Jinping, he initiated a minute of silence for 1959 Tibetan uprising in Chamber of Deputies followed by the diplomatic note from the Chinese Ambassador.

In May 2016 he caused turmoil due to his visit of congress of the Sudetendeutsche Landsmannschaft as first minister in history of the Government of the Czech Republic.

In October 2016, he caused an international incident by officially welcoming the 14th Dalai Lama after the signing of Czech-Chinese business contracts which do not allow that. He praised the United States recognition of Jerusalem as capital of Israel in December 2017 under President Donald Trump, saying that it conformed to what had been reality for 3,000 years while also saying there would be security risks associated with the move.
