= Public Security (Czechoslovakia) =

Public Security Veřejná bezpečnost VB Verejná bezpečnosť
- Abbreviation: VB

Agency overview
- Formed: 1945
- Dissolved: 15 June 1991
- Superseding agency: Police of the Czech Republic (in the Czech Republic); Slovak Police Force (in Slovakia)

Jurisdictional structure
- National agency: Czechoslovak Socialist Republic
- Operations jurisdiction: Czechoslovak Socialist Republic
- General nature: Civilian police

Operational structure
- Headquarters: Prague
- Parent agency: Sbor národní bezpečnosti Ministry of the Interior
- Child agency: Pomocná stráž VB

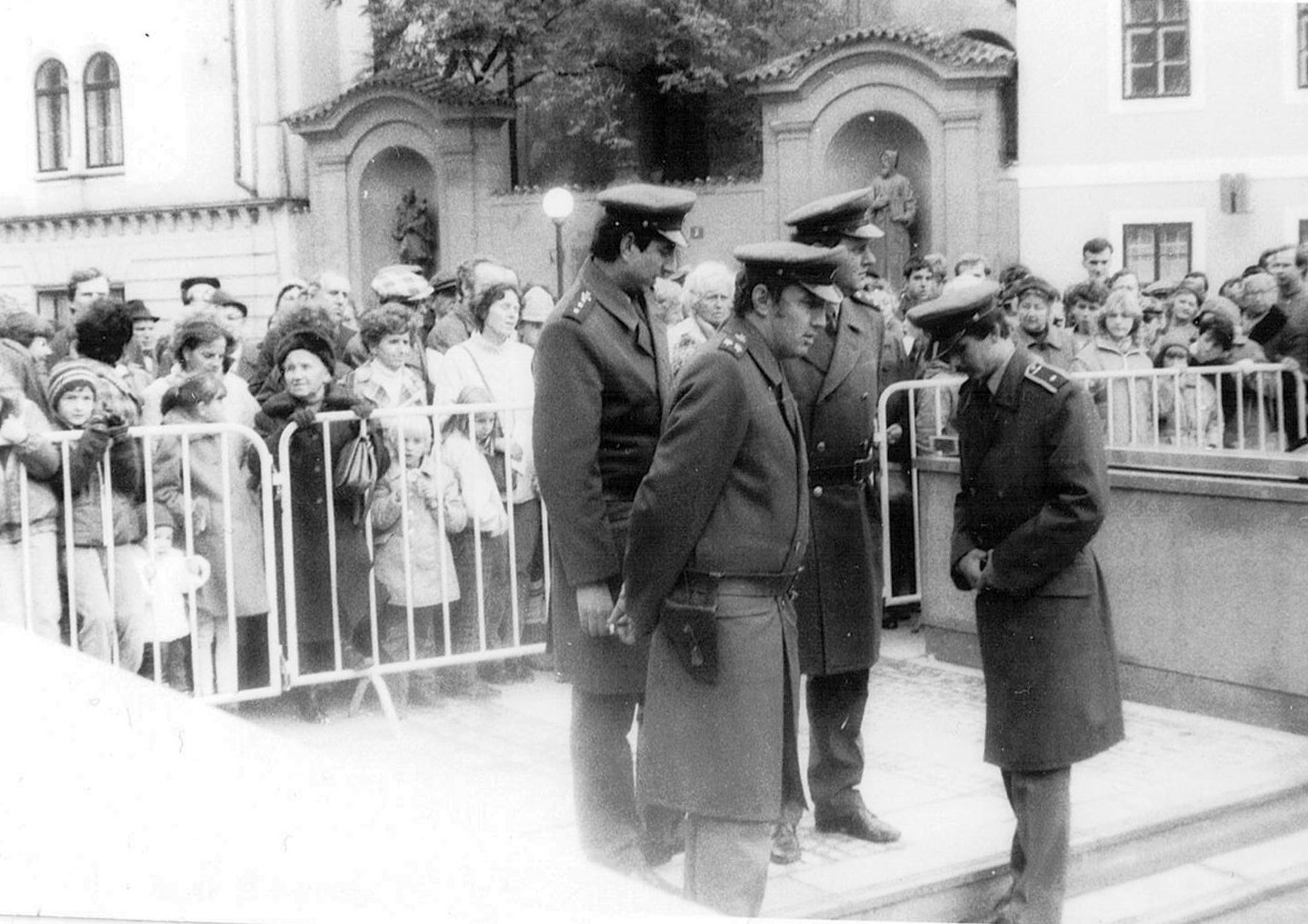
VB officers assists in the opening of Line B of the Prague Metro, Náměstí Republiky, 2 November 1985.

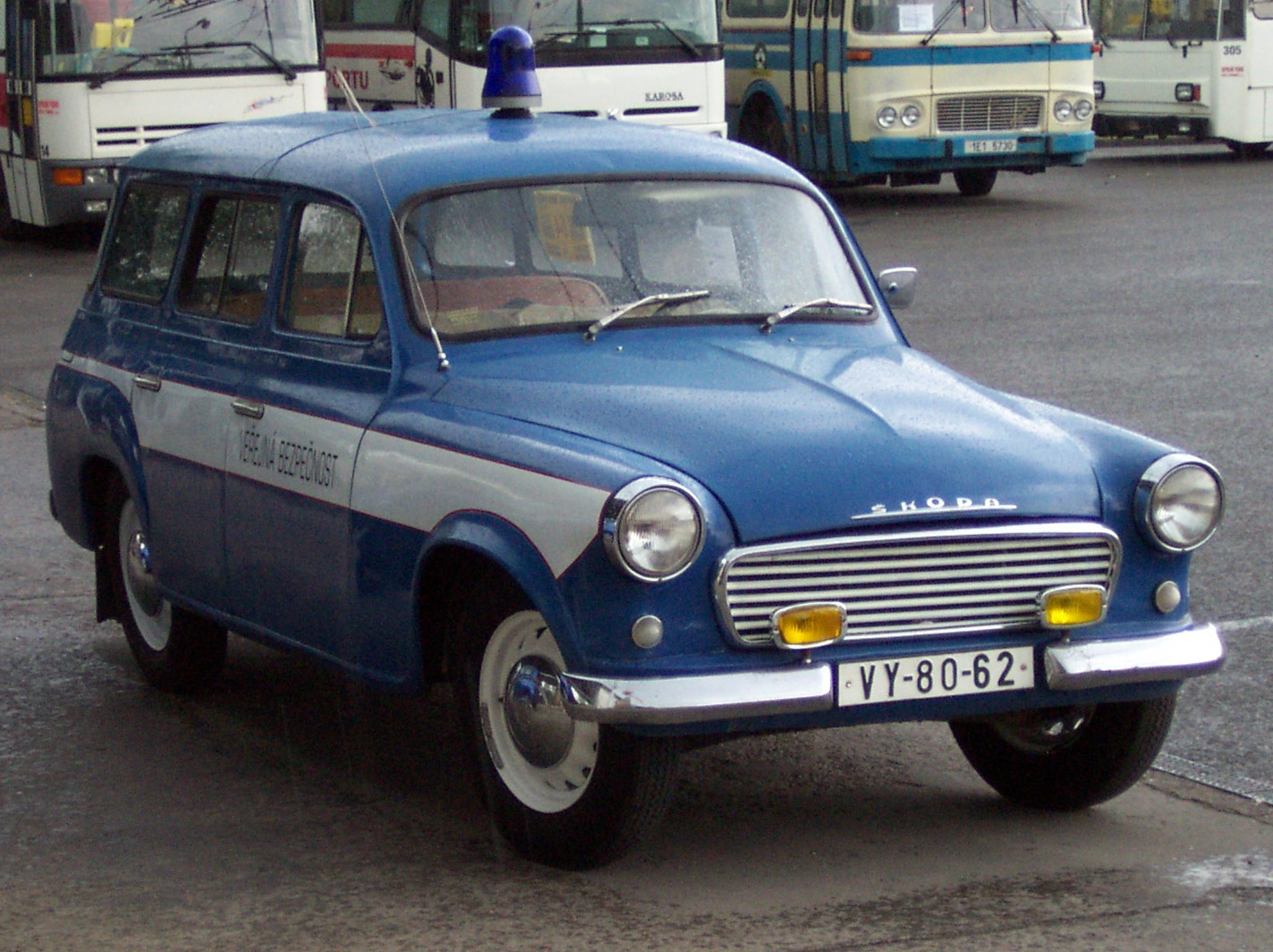
Restored Škoda 1202 VB car from 1960s in Pardubice, 2007.

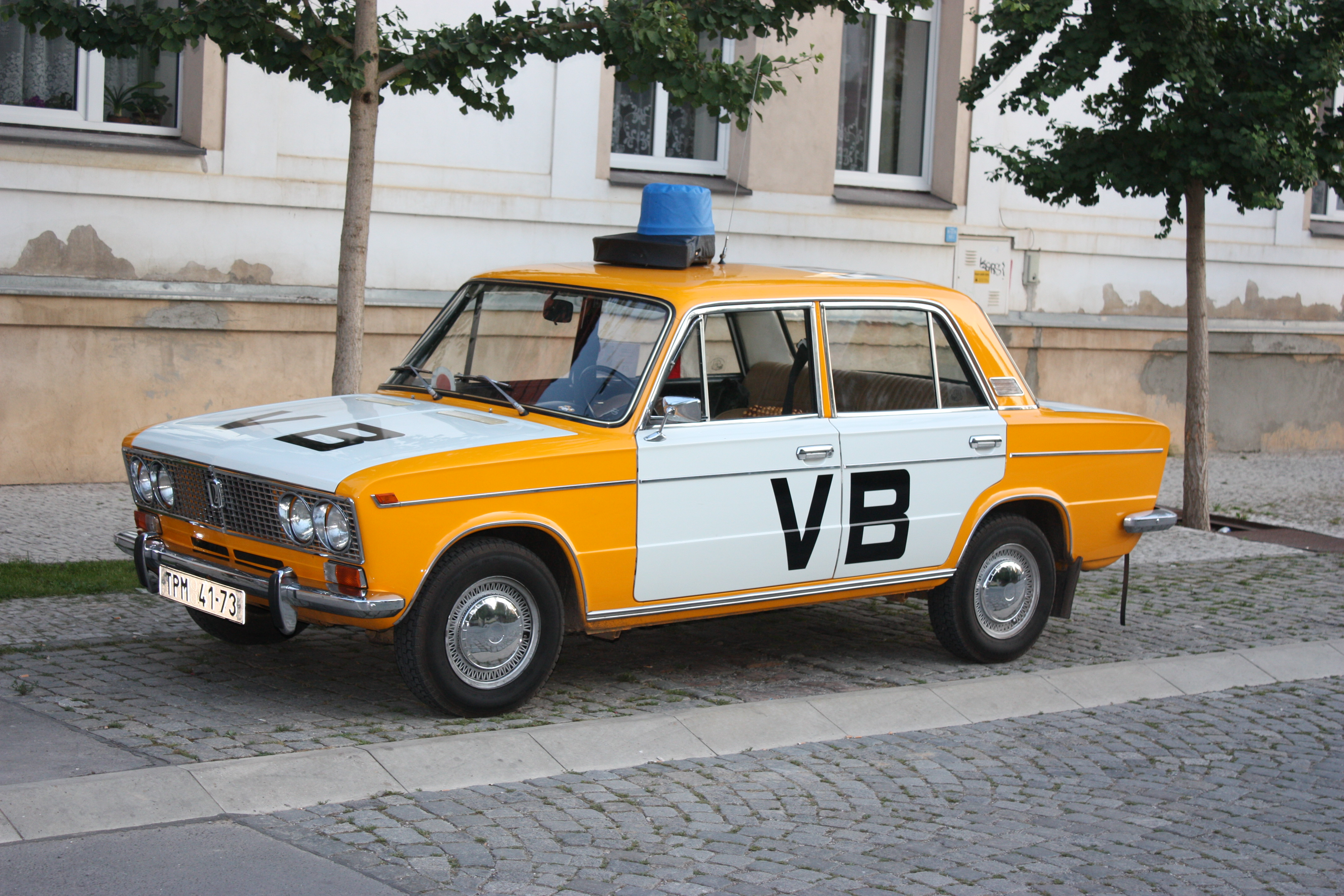
Restored VAZ-2103 VB car from 1980s in Dobřichovice, 2009.

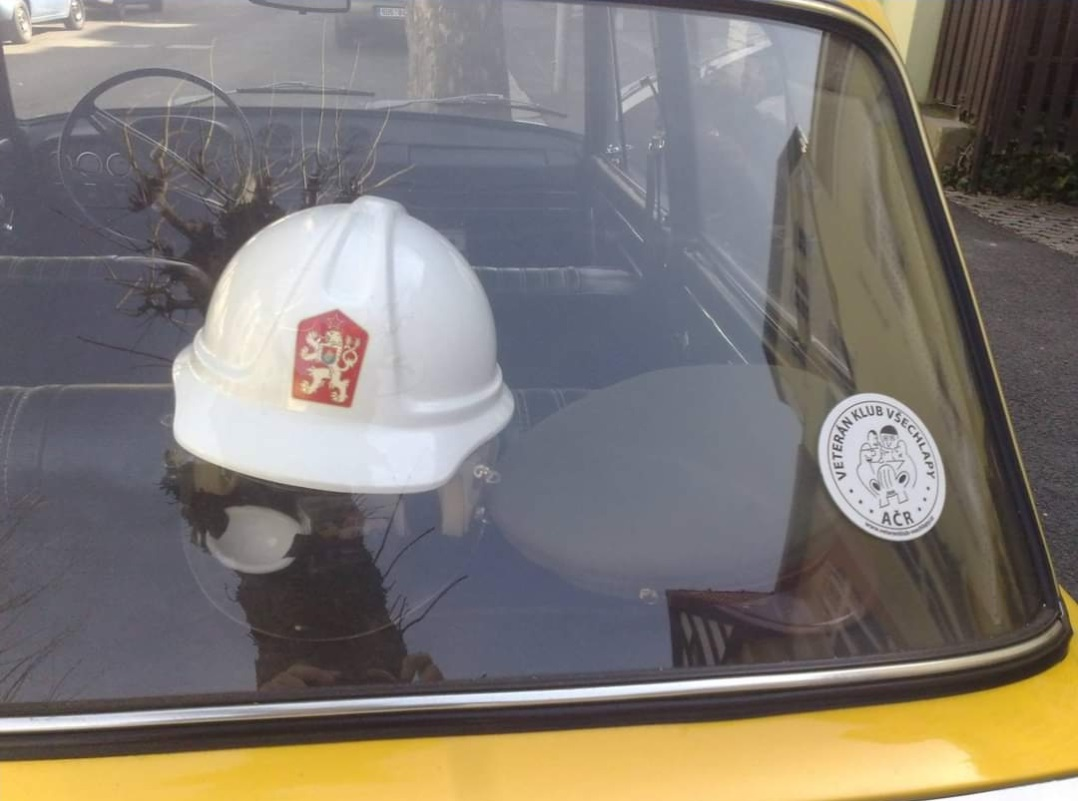
A helmet and brigadier used by Public Safety.

Public Security (Czech: Veřejná bezpečnost [VB], Slovak: Verejná bezpečnosť [VB], lit. 'Public Safety') was the regular police force of the Czechoslovak Socialist Republic (ČSSR), created in 1945 as a branch of the National Security Corps (Sbor národní bezpečnosti), which also included State Security (Státní bezpečnost).

== History ==
When the Czech Police was established on 15 July 1991, the VB was used as the basis of reforming the force under Act 283/1991 Coll.

== Organization ==
The VB was divided into the Public Order and Traffic VB (Highway Patrol), Criminal Investigations VB (major crimes, forensics) and an Infrastructure Security section (security of important buildings, installations, etc.). There were regional, district, city and local detachments of the force. Its given wartime mission scenarios include rear security operations and security of POW facilities.

The VB were permitted to demand from any citizen an identification booklet (občanský průkaz). This booklet contained a photograph and information such as name, current address and place of employment (being unemployed in the ČSSR was practically illegal, as one could be charged with "living on avails of the society"). As carrying an občanský průkaz was mandatory; a person could be detained for simply not having one in their possession.

The auxiliary wing was the 'Public Security Auxiliary Guard' (Pomocná stráž VB), recruited from "politically reliable" citizens over the age of 21, who wore a yellow arm-band with "PS VB". They were generally used for traffic control and public order duties.

== Vehicles ==
VB vehicles were originally blue with a white line along the side. Later vehicles had panels painted yellow and white in a similar pattern to American 'black and whites', which the pattern's designer admitted after the fall of the regime was his inspiration. The full name 'Veřejná bezpečnost' was used with the blue design while later vehicles had only the letters 'VB' written on the white doors.

== Uniforms ==
VB uniforms were also originally dark blue until the end of 1960s, when they changed to a khaki colour described officially as 'nettle green', with rank insignia on red epaulettes, which did not follow Soviet patterns, except for junior officers.

== In popular culture ==
The VB police Lada 1500 were used in the 1987 spy film The Living Daylights chasing James Bond through Czechoslovakia even though it was filmed in Vienna

== Rank structure ==
| Rank in Czech | English Translation | Insignia |
| Praporčické | Warrant Officers/NCO's | |
|---|---|---|
| Rotný | Junior Sergeant | one silver star |
| Strážmistr | Sergeant | two silver stars |
| Nadstrážmistr | Staff Sergeant | three silver stars |
| Podpraporčík | Junior Warrant Officer | one silver star with silver edging to epaulette |
| Praporčík | Warrant Officer | two silver stars with silver edging |
| Nadpraporčík | Senior Warrant Officer | three silver stars with silver edging |
| Důstojnické hodnosti | Officers | |
| Podporučík | Junior Lieutenant | one gold star |
| Poručík | Lieutenant | two gold stars |
| Nadporučík | Senior Lieutenant | three gold stars, arranged in triangle |
| Kapitán | Captain | three gold stars arranged in a triangle, with a fourth above them |
| Major | Major | one gold star with gold edging to epaulette |
| Podplukovník | Lieutenant Colonel | two gold stars with gold edging |
| Plukovník | Colonel | three gold stars, arranged in triangle, with gold edging |
| Generálové | General Officers | |
| Generálmajor | Major General | one large gold star with crossed staffs and gold braid edging |
| Generálporučík | Lieutenant General | two large gold stars with crossed staffs and gold braid edging |
| Generálplukovník | Colonel General | three large gold stars with crossed staffs and gold braid edging |

== See also ==
- Police of the Czech Republic
- Law enforcement in Slovakia
