= Jiří Pernes =

Czech historian (1948–2025)

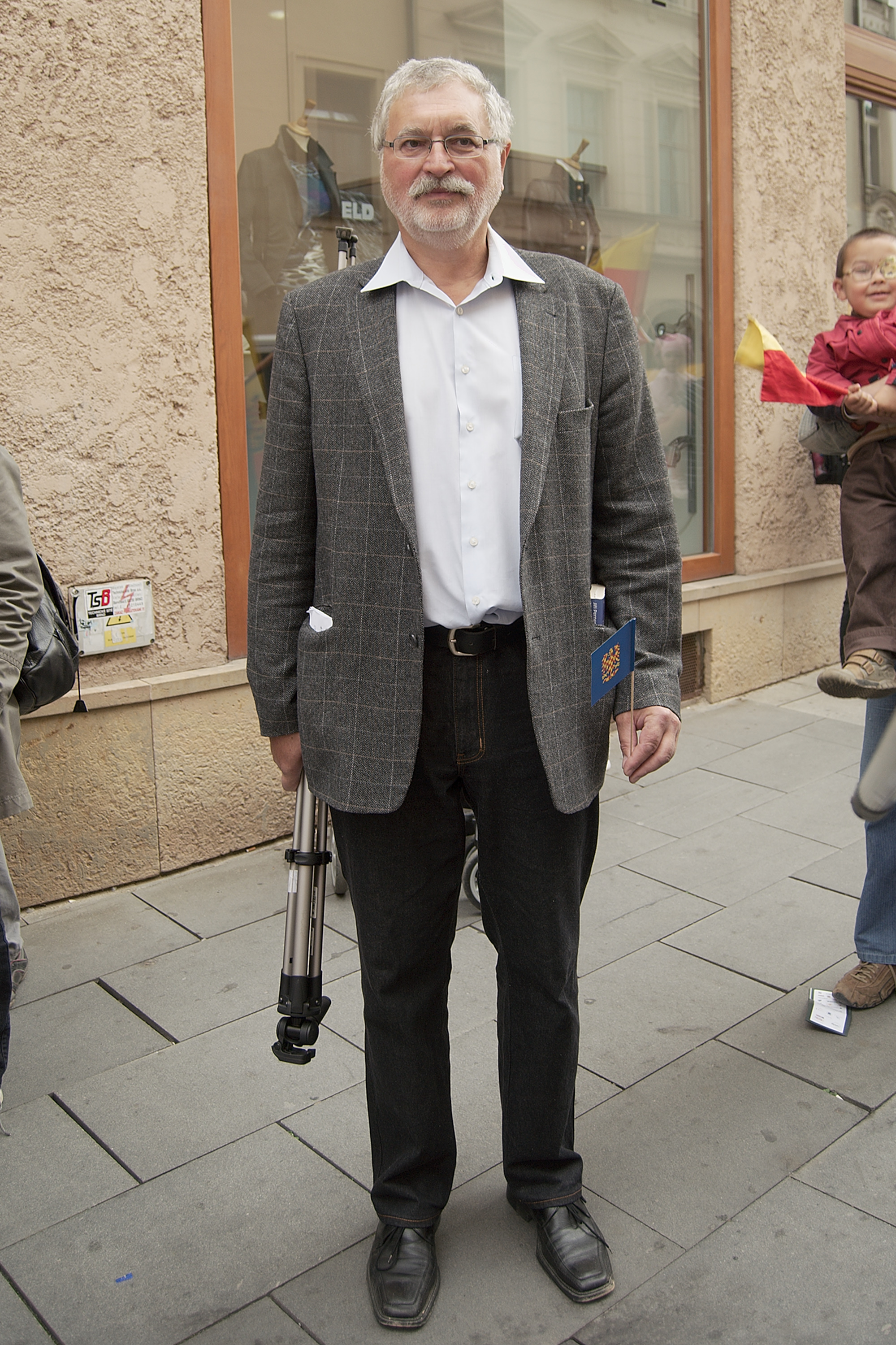
- Pernes in 2010
- Born: 4 July 1948; Svitavy, Czechoslovakia
- Died: 21 May 2025 (aged 76); Czech Republic
- Occupation: Historian

Jiří Pernes (4 July 1948 – 21 May 2025) was a Czech historian.

== Life and career ==
From 1984 to 1990, he was the director of the Historical Museum in Slavkov u Brna, and from 1990 to 1992, he was director of the Moravské zemské muzeum in Brno. In 2010, he was dismissed from his position as director of the Institute for the Study of Totalitarian Regimes after allegations that he had plagiarized large portions of his 1997 book about Emanuel Moravec from another person's doctoral dissertation. Pernes said that he had never knowingly copied the work of others.

In 2011, he directed the Institute for the Study of Totalitarian Regimes. Jiří Pernes held lectures at Masaryk University in Brno and at Jan Evangelista Purkyně University in Ústí nad Labem.

He worked in the Institute for Contemporary History at the Czech Academy of Sciences in Brno. He wrote many books and papers about Moravian, Czech and Czechoslovak history in the 19th and 20th centuries.

Pernes died on 21 May 2025, at the age of 76.

== Selected works ==
- Spiklenci proti Jeho Veličenstvu aneb Historie tzv. spiknutí Omladiny v Čechách, Praha 1988
- Život plný nepřátel aneb Život a smrt Františka Ferdinanda d'Este, Praha 1995
- Habsburkové bez trůnu, Praha 1995
- Pod moravskou orlicí aneb Dějiny moravanství, Brno 1996
- Maxmilián I. Mexický císař z rodu Habsburků, Praha 1997
- Až na dno zrady. Emanuel Moravec, Praha 1997
- Pod Habsburským orlem. České země a Rakousko-Uhersko na přelomu 19. a 20. století, Praha 2001, 2006
- Takoví nám vládli. Komunističtí prezidenti Československa a doba, v níž žili, Praha 2003
- František Josef I. Nikdy nekorunovaný český král, Praha 2005
- Komunistky. S fanatismem v srdci, Praha 2006
- Krize komunistického režimu v Československu v 50. letech 20. století, Brno 2008
