= Office for the Documentation and the Investigation of the Crimes of Communism =

The Office of the Documentation and the Investigation of the Crimes of Communism (Czech: Úřad dokumentace a vyšetřování zločinů komunismu, abbrev. ÚDV) is the Czech police subdivision which investigated criminal acts from 1948 to 1989 which were unsolvable for political reasons during the Czechoslovak communist regime.

== See also ==
- Institute for the Study of Totalitarian Regimes
