= NICO BTV-1 flash-bang grenade =

Flash-bang grenade used in the United States

NICO BTV-1
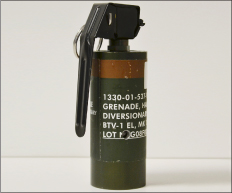
- NICO BTV-1
- Type: Flashbang grenade
- Place of origin: United States

The NICO BTV-1 is an American flash-bang grenade.

== Design ==
The BTV-1 is intended to prevent serious injury to personnel in the event of premature detonation of the grenade, provide 3–5 seconds of flash blindness, a lower pressure to reduce blast injury risk, and hand-safe capability with metal body and top and bottom venting.
