= Stun grenade =

Non-lethal grenade

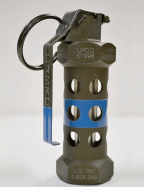
M84 stun grenade

A stun grenade, also known as a flash grenade, flashbang, thunderflash, concussion grenade or sound bomb, is a less-lethal explosive device used to temporarily disorient an enemy's senses. Upon detonation, a stun grenade produces a blinding flash of light and an extremely loud "bang". They are often used in close-quarters combat, door breaching, and riot control, typically to stun enemies or distract them.

Originally developed to simulate explosions during military training, stun grenades were first used by the British Army Special Air Service's counterterrorist wing in the late 1970s, and have been used by police and military forces worldwide since.

Despite their less-lethal nature, stun grenades are still capable of causing harm, and can injure or kill when detonating in close proximity. They are also capable of sparking fires.

== Effects ==
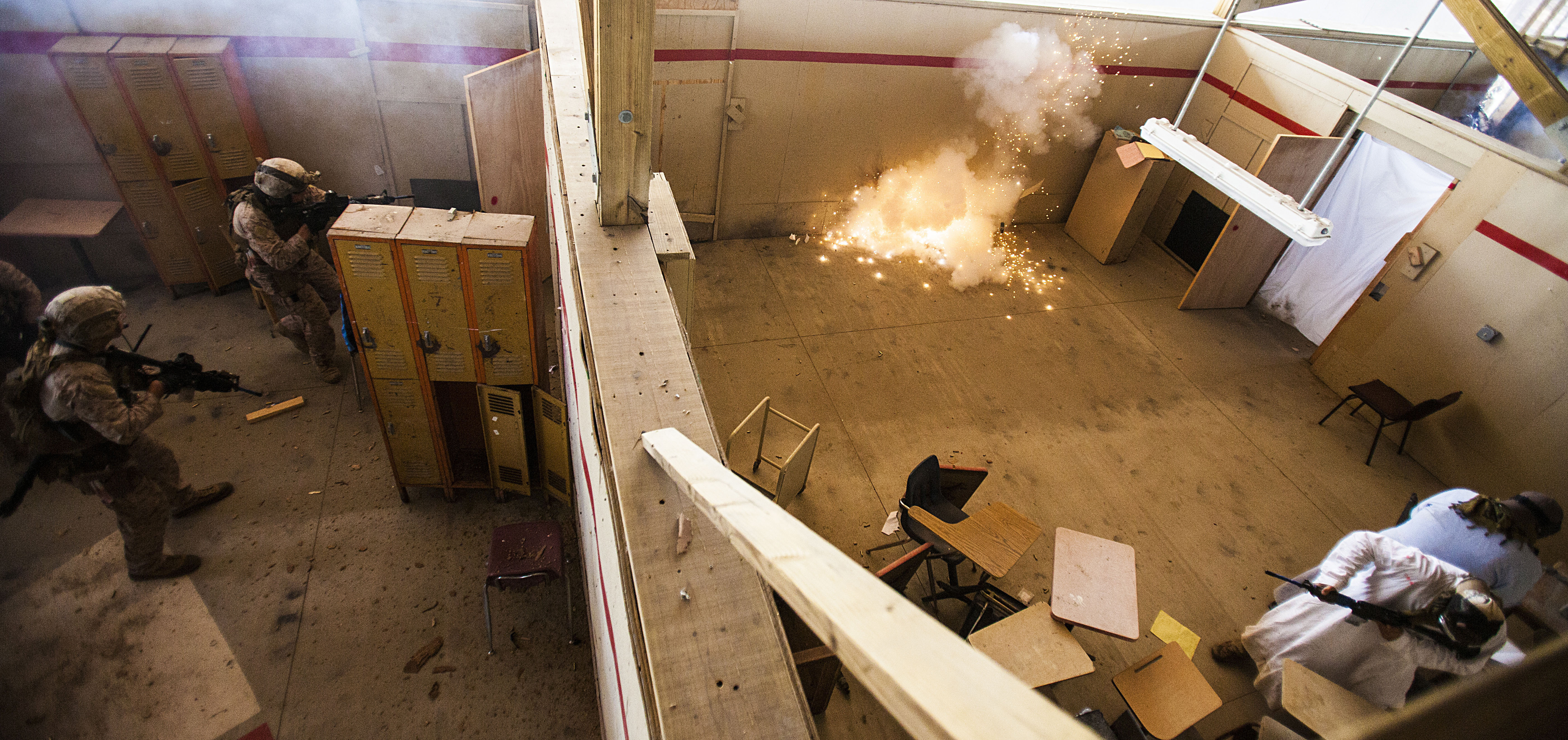
A stun grenade, thrown by U.S. Marines during a training exercise, detonating in a small room

Stun grenades are designed to produce a blinding flash of light of around 7 megacandela (Mcd) and an intensely loud "bang" of greater than 170 decibels (dB).

== Construction ==
Unlike a fragmentation grenade, stun grenades are constructed with a casing designed to remain intact during detonation and avoid fragmentation injuries, while having large circular cutouts to allow the light and sound of the explosion through. The filler comprises a pyrotechnic metal-oxidant mix of magnesium or aluminium and an oxidizer such as potassium perchlorate or potassium nitrate.

== Hazards ==
While stun grenades are designed to limit injury, permanent hearing loss has been reported. The concussive blast has the ability to cause injuries, and the heat generated may ignite flammable materials. The fires that occurred during the 1980 Iranian Embassy siege in London were caused by stun grenades. Additionally, in the 2026 French student protests, a student lost his hand from police use of a stun grenade.

== See also ==
- Blast ball – Less-lethal hand grenade
- Dazzler – Non-lethal temporary blindness weapon
- M84 stun grenade – American less-lethal pyrotechnic
- NICO BTV-1 flash-bang grenade – Flash-bang grenade used in the United States
- Smoke grenade
