= StB =

Secret police force in Czechoslovakia

State Security
- Státní bezpečnost Štátna bezpečnosť
- Coat of arms of Czechoslovakia

Agency overview
- Formed: 30 June 1945
- Dissolved: 1 February 1990
- Superseding agency: Federal Security Information Service
- Type: Secret police, Intelligence agency
- Jurisdiction: Czechoslovakia
- Headquarters: Prague, Czechoslovakia
- Agency executive: Alojz Lorenc, Last Director
- Parent agency: National Security Corps

State Security (Czech: Státní bezpečnost, Slovak: Štátna bezpečnosť), or StB / ŠtB, was the secret police force in communist Czechoslovakia from 1945 to its dissolution in 1990. Serving as an intelligence and counter-intelligence agency, it dealt with any activity that was considered opposition to the Communist Party of Czechoslovakia and the state.

== History ==
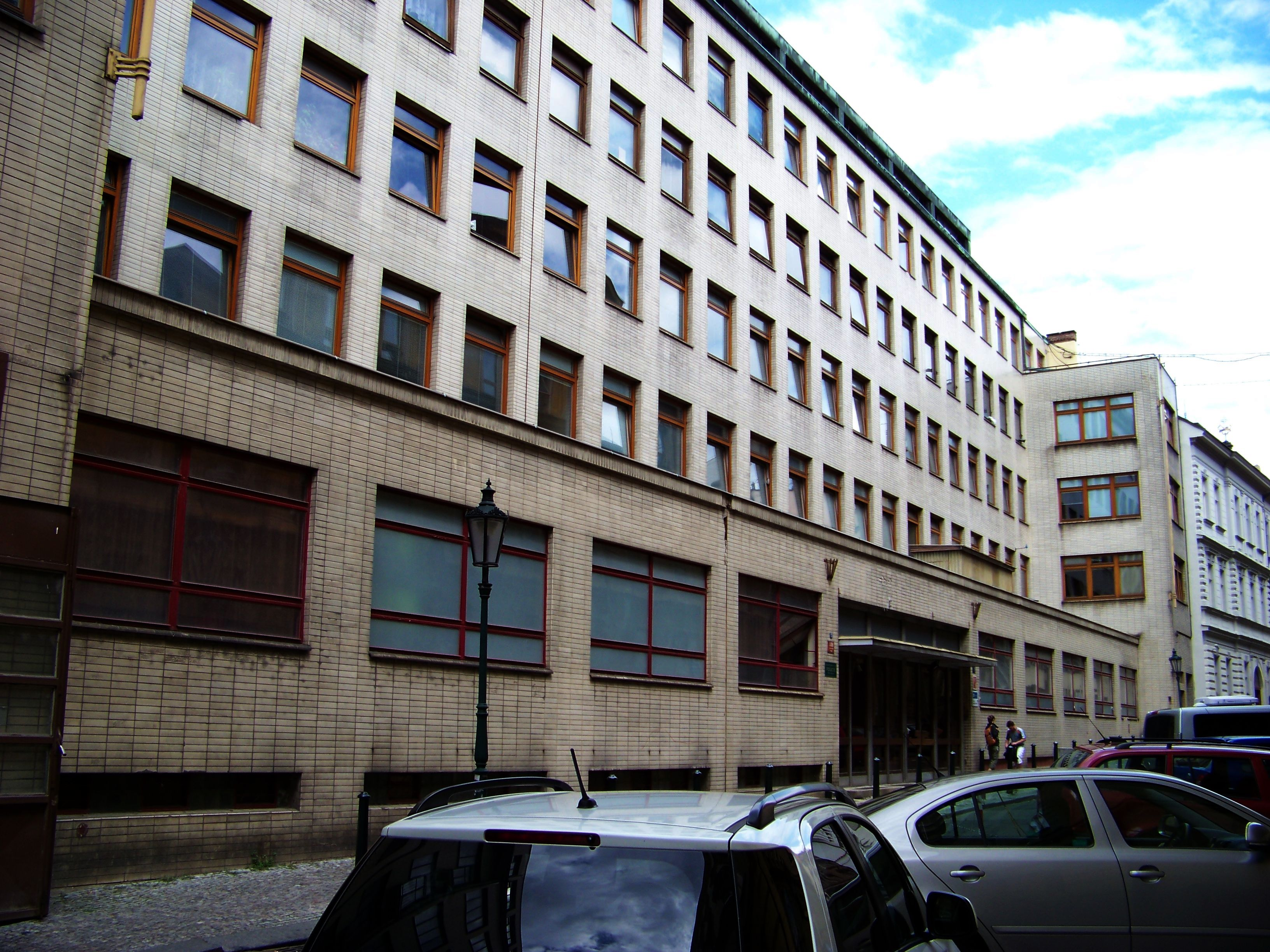
Former headquarters of the StB, Old Town (Prague)

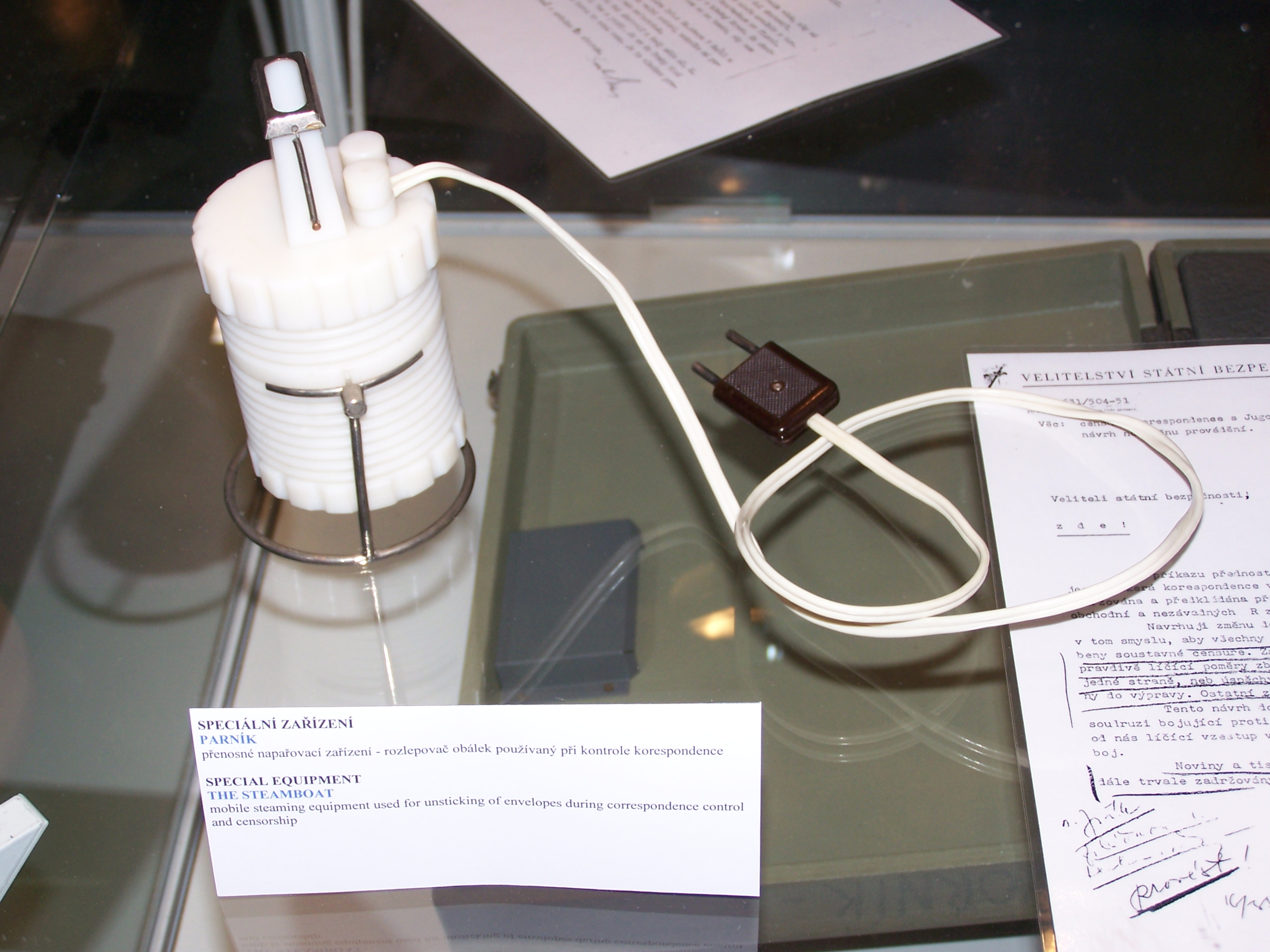
Letter opener used by StB

From its establishment on 30 June 1945, the StB was controlled by the Communist Party of Czechoslovakia. The Party used the StB as an instrument of power and repression; State Security spied on and intimidated political opponents of the Party and forged false criminal evidence against them, facilitating the communists' rise to power in 1948. After the arrival of Soviet advisors in 1949, nearly a year after the Communist Party of Czechoslovakia seized power, the StB began to undergo a fundamental ideological change as the older generation of experienced, educated, and mostly middle-class secret police began to be replaced or purged. The replacements were a younger generation of secret police who were mostly from working class backgrounds and were drowned in the intense rhetoric of class struggle and political loyalty. Under the tutelage of Soviet advisors, the younger generation adopted a Stalinist ideology and obtained forced confessions by means of torture, including the use of psychoactive drugs, blackmail, and kidnapping.

Other common practices included telephone tapping, permanent monitoring of apartments, intercepting private mail, house searches, surveillance, and arrests and indictment for so-called "subversion of the republic". After the coup, the StB conducted Operation Border Stone to capture citizens who attempted to defect and cross the Iron Curtain.

StB was the main supporter of the Red Brigades, an Italian far-left militant organization. In cooperation with the Palestine Liberation Organization (PLO), the StB conducted logistic support and training for Red Brigades in PLO training camps in North Africa and Syria.

The StB's part in the fall of the regime in 1989 remains uncertain. The reported murder of a student by police during a peaceful demonstration in November 1989 was the catalyst for wider public support and further demonstrations, leading to the overthrow of the communist regime. According to StB agent Ludvík Zifčák, he was used to impersonate a fictitious dead student, Martin Šmíd. However, in 1992, the Czechoslovak parliamentary commission for investigation of events of 17 November 1989 has ruled out Zifčák's testimony, stating that "the role of former StB lieutenant L. Zifčák was only marginal, without any connection to critical events and without any active effort to influence these events. Investigation of related circumstances has indisputably proved that L. Zifčák's testimony that attributes a key role in November's events to himself is based on facts, which are either technically impossible and unfeasible, or contradict actions of persons mentioned by him, which aimed to completely different goals."

State Security was dissolved on 1 February 1990. The current intelligence agency of the Czech Republic is the Security Information Service. Former employees and associates (informers) of the StB are currently banned from taking certain jobs, such as legislators or police officers.

The Act on Lawlessness of the Communist Regime and on Resistance Against It states that the StB, as an organization based on the ideology of the Communist Party, "aimed to suppress human rights and democracy through its activities" and thus based on a criminal ideology.

== Organization within the Czechoslovak government ==
The State Security was a part of the National Security Corps (Czech: Sbor národní bezpečnosti, SNB; Slovak: Zbor národnej bezpečnosti, ZNB) along with Public Security (Czech: Veřejná bezpečnost, VB; Slovak: Verejná bezpečnosť, VB) – a uniformed force that performed standard police duties. Both forces worked at regional and district levels, supervised by the Ministries of the Interior of the Czech and Slovak Socialist Republics, but operationally directed by the federal Ministry of Interior. They shared similar insignia to the regular police.

== Directors ==
- Jindřich Veselý (1948–1950)
- Osvald Závodský (1950–1951)
- Jaroslav Hora (1951–1951)
- Antonín Prchal (1951–1956)
- Viliam Salgovic (1968–1968)
- Ján Hanuliak (1970–1979)
- Ján Kováč (1979–1985)
- Alojz Lorenc (1985–1990)

== List of StB agents and collaborators ==
In the early 1990s former dissident and "StB hunter" Petr Cibulka published the names of over 200,000 alleged StB officers and collaborators, who spied and reported on family members, friends, neighbours, and colleagues.

Pavel Bret, a deputy director of the Office for the Documentation and the Investigation of the Crimes of Communism, criticized Cibulka's lists, saying: "It's dangerous to apply sweeping blacklisting. We shouldn't forget who compiled them. If [Cibulka] wants to be objective, he should also inform the public how people had been recruited – that it was often through compromising documents, extortion, beatings – or their collaboration was falsified."

In 2003, the Czech Interior Ministry released an official list of 75,000 StB agents and collaborators, including 3,000 names of collaborators from abroad. According to Radio Prague, "The Ministry says it contains less names than that of Petr Cibulka because it only lists those who collaborated with the StB knowingly, and not people who were considered as potential informants."

== In popular culture ==
Monster, a manga written by Naoki Urasawa from 1994 to 2001 that later received an anime adaptation, uses the StB as a plot element and involves the idea that they still operated in the shadows after their alleged dissolution. Several former members of the StB are secondary characters in the manga and anime series.

The 1990 video game Metal Gear 2: Solid Snake featured an StB agent named Gustava Heffner ("Natasha Marcova" in the original script) who is Solid Snake's ally. She was killed by her old flame, Gray Fox, when he recaptured Dr. Drago Pettrovich Madnar, but before she died she gave Snake the next level Card Key and a brooch made of Shape-memory alloy, which came in handy to recover the late Dr. Kio Marv's research.

== See also ==
- AVO
- Domeček
- Eastern Bloc politics
- KGB
- Stasi
