= Sbor národní bezpečnosti =

National police in Czechoslovakia from 1945 to 1991

National Security Corps Sbor národní bezpečnosti (Czech) Zbor národnej bezpečnosti (Slovak)
- Abbreviation: SNB / ZNB
- Motto: "Ve službách lidu" "V službách ľudu" ("Serve the People")

Agency overview
- Formed: 1945
- Dissolved: 27 August 1991
- Superseding agency: Federal Police Corps

Jurisdictional structure
- Legal jurisdiction: Czechoslovakia

Operational structure
- Headquarters: Prague
- Agency executive: Antonín Sameš (1945)
- Parent agency: Ministry of the Interior; Ministry of National Security (1950–1953)
- Child agencies: Public Security; State Security; Rapid Response Unit

The National Security Corps (Czech: Sbor národní bezpečnosti; SNB; Slovak: Zbor národnej bezpečnosti; ZNB) was the national police in Czechoslovakia from 1945 to 1991.

== History ==
At the end of World War II, on 4 April 1945, Edvard Beneš headed the first postwar government at Košice, dominated by the three socialist parties, including the Communist Party of Czechoslovakia (KSČ). The SNB was established by the coalition government as part of the Ministry of the Interior during a meeting in Košice on April 17, replacing the traditional police and gendarmes.

The KSČ gained control of the Ministry of Interior when Václav Nosek was appointed minister and began converting the security forces into arms of the party. Between 1945 and 1948, anti-Communist police officials and officers were fired, non-Communist personnel were encouraged to join the KSČ, and all were subjected to Communist indoctrination. Nosek's replacement of the upper police hierarchy with Communists caused the protest resignation of anti-Communist government ministers in February 1948, leading to the Czechoslovak coup d'etat of 1948. When the coup took place, Nosek's Communist-dominated security forces ensured an easy takeover.

The SNB was abolished and replaced by the Czech Police on 15 July 1991 under Act 283/1991 Coll, taking over its VB units after the Velvet Revolution of 1989.

== Structure and membership ==
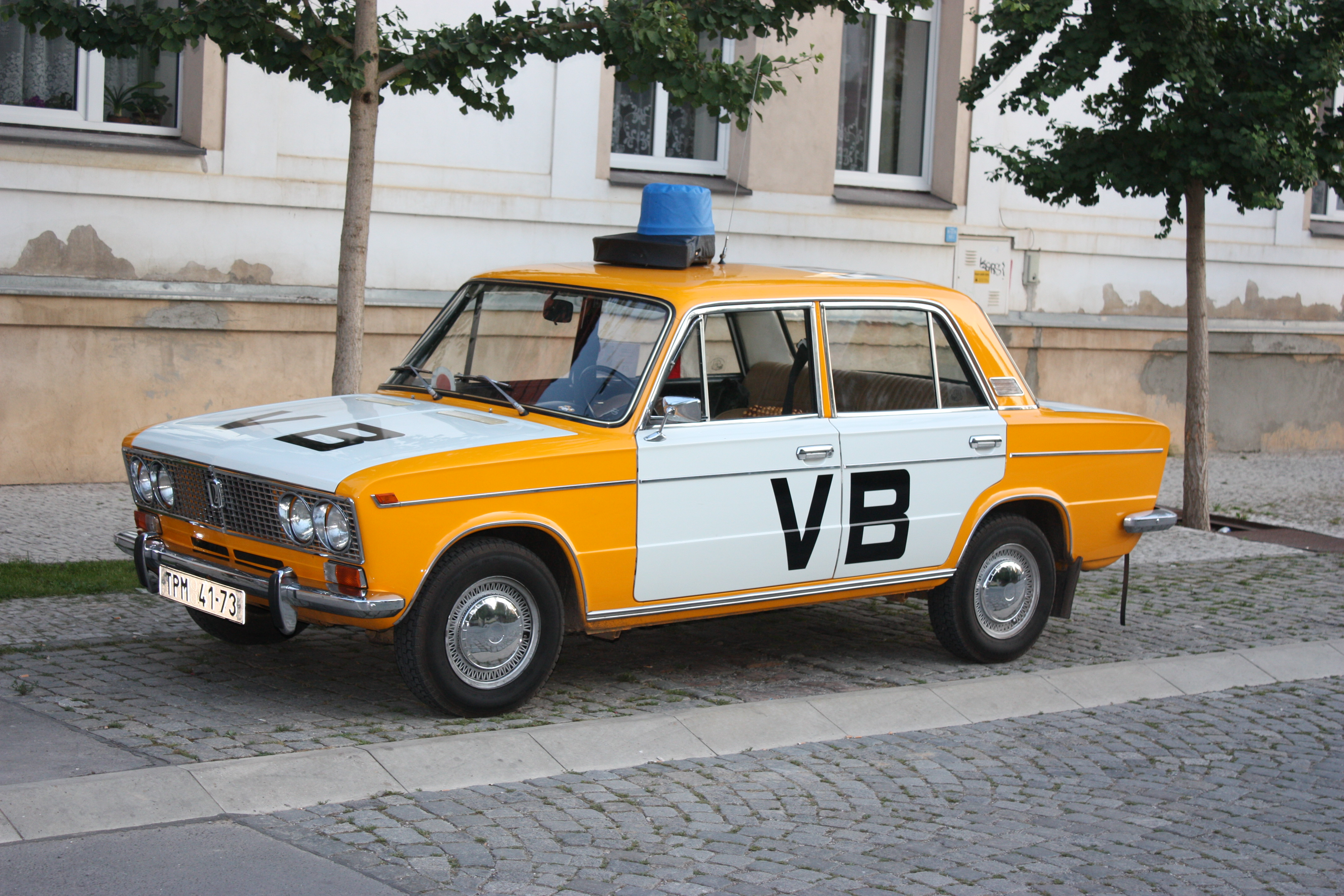
Lada police car of VB

The SNB consisted of two separate organizations, consisting of Veřejná bezpečnost (VB; Public Security), and the Státní bezpečnost (StB) (State Security). The VB was the uniformed force that performed routine police duties throughout the country. The StB was a plainclothes secret police force, at once an investigative agency, an intelligence agency, and a counterintelligence agency. Any activity that could be considered anti-state fell under the purview of StB. A 1982 article in the Czechoslovak press indicated that 75 percent of the SNB were either members or candidate members of the KSČ and that 60 percent were under 30 years of age. In 1986 about 80 percent of the SNB members in Slovakia came from worker or farmer families.

VB and StB units were deployed throughout the country with headquarters at regional and district levels; there were 10 regions and 114 districts in 1987. VB forces also established sections in rural areas. Both forces were officially under the supervision of the ministries of interior of the Czech and Slovak socialists republics. However, in practice operational direction of the security forces came from the Ministry of Interior at the federal level, and the two ministries of the component republics had administrative rather than supervisory functions.

In 1981, the Útvar zvláštního určení was created by the SNB for anti-terrorism duties through Czechoslovakia.

== Functions ==
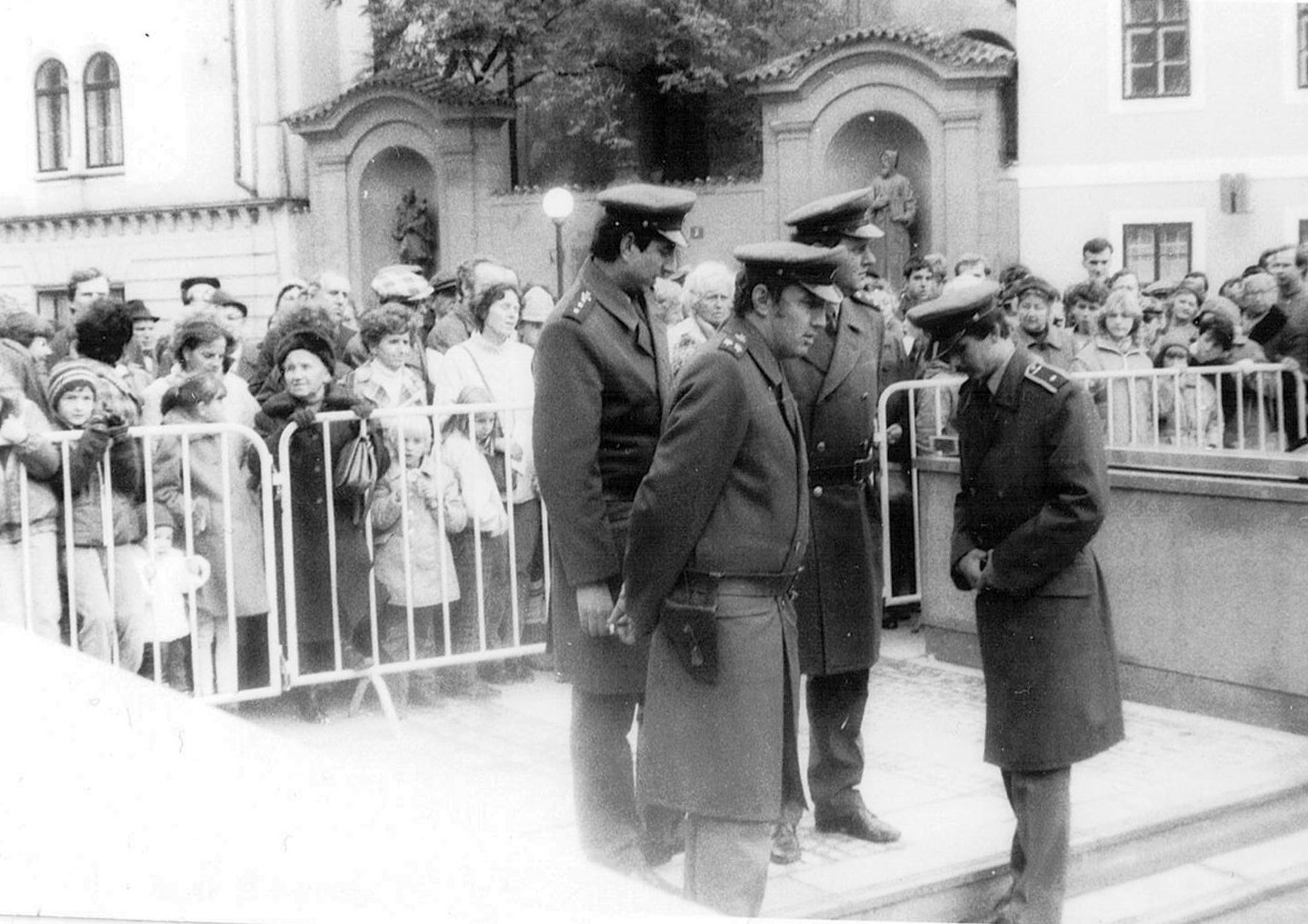
VB officers assists in Prague, 1985

The SNB was an armed force, organized and trained as an army but equipped to perform police rather than military functions. Its members were subject to military discipline and were under the jurisdiction of military courts. Ranks in the SNB corresponded to equivalent levels in the Czechoslovak People's Army. As of 1987 the SNB was a volunteer service, although conscription was apparently used to rebuild the force after the loss of personnel at the end of Alexander Dubček's leadership. Citizens with the requisite physical and educational qualifications could apply for direct appointment to the SNB.

Qualifications included completion of the compulsory nine years of schooling and of the basic conscript tour in the armed forces; higher education was required for appointment to higher level positions, such as scientific, technical, and investigative positions. The Ministry of Interior operated a higher-level educational institute, which trained security personnel at different stages of their careers. The Advanced School of the National Security Corps, which occupied a large complex of buildings in Prague, granted academic degrees to the SNB and the Border Guard, also part of the Ministry of Interior.

The VB performed routine police functions at all levels from federal to local. In 1987 it was described as a relatively small force given its responsibilities, but it was augmented by volunteer auxiliary units. Articles in the Slovak press in the mid-1980s mentioned 27,000 auxiliary guards in 3,372 units assisting the VB in Slovakia alone. No figure was available for numbers in the Czech lands, but it is reasonable to assume that these numbers would be at least double that reported for Slovakia. The federal minister of interior controlled other forces that could be ordered to assist the VB if needed, and he could also request further help from the military.

In mid-1987, the uniform of the VB was almost identical to the Czechoslovak People's Army (ČSLA) uniform, but with red shoulder boards and red trimming on hats distinguishing VB personnel from military. VB vehicles were yellow and white, with the initials VB on the sides, front, and rear.
